= Codona (disambiguation) =

Codona was an American jazz ensemble.

Codona may also refer to:

- Codona (album), an album by Codona
- Codona 2, an album by Codona
- Codona 3, an album by Codona
- Codona's, an amusement park in Aberdeen, Scotland
- Alfredo Codona (1893–1937), Mexican trapeze artist
- Victoria Codona Adolph (1891–1983), Mexican circus performer
- The Three Codonas (German: Die drei Codonas), a 1940 German drama film
