= Heresay =

Studio album by Paul McCandless
- Released: 1988
- Recorded: February 1988
- Genre: Jazz
- Label: Windham Hill
- Producer: Paul McCandless

Paul McCandless chronology
Navigator (1982)	Heresay (1988)	Premonition (1992)

Heresay is an album by American jazz instrumentalist Paul McCandless recorded in 1988 for Windham Hill Records. It was re-released in 1988.

== Track listing ==
1. "Sojourner" - 8:50
2. "Beside A Brook" - 4:53
3. "The Marvelous Harlequin Duck" - 3:08
4. "Cloudy This Morning" - 5:15
5. "Kinesphere" - 2:51
6. "Tail Wind" - 6:13
7. "Hologram" - 5:15
8. "Eyebright" - 6:15

- Recorded April 1988, OTR Studios, Belmont, California

== Personnel ==
- Paul McCandless - Oboe, English Horn, Soprano Saxophone, Piccolo, Clarinet, Bass Clarinet, Penny whistle, Wind Controller, Synthesizer
- Steve Rodby - Acoustic Bass
- Trilok Gurtu - Drums, Percussion, Tabla
- Wally Kane - Flute, Piccolo Flute, Clarinet, Bass Clarinet
- Keith Green - French Horn
- Robert Firpo - Percussion
- Art Lande - Piano
- Cookie Marenco - Synthesizer
