= Heretick =

Heretick may refer to:

- Steve Heretick (born 1960), American politician
- The Heretick, a British satirical magazine

== See also ==
- Heretic (disambiguation)
