= Lantern (Oregon album) =

Studio album by Oregon
- Released: 2017
- Recorded: November 2016
- Studio: Bauer Studios, Ludwigsburg
- Genre: Jazz
- Length: 62:00
- Label: CAM Jazz
- Producer: Ermanno Basso

Oregon chronology
Family Tree (2012)	Lantern (2017)

Lantern is the thirtieth and final album by American world music/jazz group Oregon featuring Ralph Towner, Paul McCandless, Paolino Dalla Porta, and Mark Walker recorded in November 2016 and released on the CAM Jazz label in 2017. It is the only Oregon record to feature bassist Paolino Dalla Porta, who succeeded Oregon's founding member Glen Moore in 2015.

== Reception ==
Professional ratings
Review scores
Source	Rating
All About Jazz	4.5/5 stars
The Guardian	4/5 stars
The Irish Times	3/5 stars

On June 26, 2017, All About Jazz critic John Kelman wrote: "Lantern makes clear that... Oregon remains as effortlessly surprising and holistically inimitable as it's ever been." Regarding the band's new bassist, Kelman remarked: "...while the influx of new blood has altered the group's complexion to some extent, it remains a group that sounds like no other. Simply put: Lantern remains an album that could be made by no-one else but Oregon."

DownBeat's Bobby Reed called the album "terrific," and stated: "Throughout the program, all four musicians' exquisite solos are featured amid polished, profound cohesion. Graceful teamwork is what makes Lantern shine so brightly."

The Guardian's John Ford praised the band's "subtle way with poignant and lyrical music," and commented: "They still sound as if they know how to have some very sophisticated fun."

Cormac Larkin of The Irish Times remarked: "Oregon cover the spectrum from delicate chamber music to full-throated post-bop to funky world grooves."

== Track listing ==
All compositions by Ralph Towner except where noted.

1. "Dolomiti Dance" — 6:11
2. "Duende" — 5:59
3. "Walk the Walk" (Mark Walker) — 6:35
4. "Not Forgotten" — 4:31
5. "Hop, Skip and A Thump" — 6:24
6. "Figurine" — 2:54
7. "The Glide" — 8:07
8. "Aeolian Tale" (Paolino Dalla Porta) — 5:46
9. "Lantern" (Oregon) — 7:58
10. "The Water Is Wide" (Traditional, arranged by Paul McCandless) — 7:07

== Personnel ==
- Paul McCandless – oboe, English horn, soprano saxophone, bass clarinet, flute
- Paolino Dalla Porta – double bass
- Ralph Towner – classical guitar, piano, synthesizer
- Mark Walker – drums, hand percussion, drum synthesizer
