= Evansiana =

Studio album by Paul McCandless & John Taylor & Pierluigi Balducci & Michele Rabbia
- Released: February 2017
- Recorded: October 2014
- Genre: Jazz
- Length: 48:00
- Label: Dodicilune
- Producer: Gabriele Rampino

Evansiana is a jazz album by a quartet with Paul McCandless, John Taylor, Pierluigi Balducci and Michele Rabbia. The album is an anthology of compositions by the pianist Bill Evans. It was released in February 2017 by the Italian label Dodicilune.

== Track listing ==
No.	Title	Music	Length
1.	"Very Early"	Bill Evans	4:17
2.	"Re: Person I Knew"	Evans	5:20
3.	"Time Remembered"	Evans	5:34
4.	"Turn Out the Stars"	Evans	4:53
5.	"B Minor Waltz (for Elaine)"	Evans	3:28
6.	"Children Play Song"	Evans	4:44
7.	"Some Other Time"	Evans	7:20
8.	"Sweet Dulcinea Blue"	Kenny Wheeler	6:27
9.	"Blue in Green"	Miles Davis	2:47
10.	"Epilogue"	Evans	2:59

== Personnel ==
- Paul McCandless – soprano sax, oboe (track 2), bass clarinet (7)
- John Taylor – piano
- Pierluigi Balducci – electric bass
- Michele Rabbia – drums, percussion
