= Oregon (album) =

Studio album by Oregon
- Released: 1983
- Recorded: February 1983
- Studio: Tonstudio Bauer; Ludwigsburg, West Germany
- Genre: Chamber jazz, ethno jazz, folk jazz, world fusion, jazz fusion, new-age
- Length: 44:38
- Label: ECM 1258
- Producer: Manfred Eicher

Oregon chronology
In Performance (1980)	Oregon (1983)	Crossing (1984)

Oregon is an album by American jazz fusion band Oregon recorded in February 1983 and released on ECM later that year. The quartet features guitarist Ralph Towner, reed player Paul McCandless, bassist Glen Moore, and sitarist Collin Walcott.

== Reception and charting ==
The album reached number twenty one on Billboards Jazz Albums and Top Jazz Albums charts.

The AllMusic review by Thom Jurek awarded the album 1½ stars, stating, "If this disc was supposed to signal a new direction in the band's development, somewhere along the line they slipped off track".

Professional ratings
Review scores
Source	Rating
Allmusic	1.5/5 stars
The Penguin Guide to Jazz Recordings	3/4 stars

Jazz disc jockey Joe Lex uses "The Rapids" as the outro for his weekly radio show "Dr. Joe's Groove" on WPPM-LP, Philadelphia.

== Track listing ==
All compositions by Oregon except as indicated

1. "The Rapids" (Ralph Towner) - 8:29
2. "Beacon" - 2:56
3. "Taos" - 6:15
4. "Beside a Brook" (Paul McCandless) - 4:26
5. "Arianna" (Glen Moore) - 6:29
6. "There Was No Moon That Night" - 7:19
7. "Skyline" - 1:19
8. "Impending Bloom" (Moore) - 7:51

== Personnel ==
- Paul McCandless - soprano saxophone, oboe, tin flute, English horn, musette
- Glen Moore - bass, violin, piano
- Ralph Towner - classical guitar, 12 string guitar, piano, synthesizer
- Collin Walcott - sitar, percussion, bass drum, voice

== Charts ==
Year	Chart	Position
1983	Billboard Jazz Albums	21
1983	Billboard Top Jazz Albums	21
