= Hearsay (disambiguation) =

Hearsay, in law, refers to a testimony based on what a witness heard rather than what they witnessed personally.

Hearsay or Hear Say may also refer to:

== Music ==
- Hear'Say, a British pop group
- Hearsay, an American girl group that included Ciara
- Hearsay (album), by Alexander O'Neal, 1987
- "Hearsay" (song), by Alexander O'Neal, 1989
- "Hearsay", a song by Colette Carr from Skitszo, 2013
- "Hearsay", a song by The Gladiators from Trenchtown Mix Up, 1976
- "Hearsay", a song by The Soul Children, 1972
- "Hear Say", a song by Ja Rule from The Mirror, 2007

== Other uses ==
- Terence Hearsay, a fictional character in the poem cycle A Shropshire Lad by A. E. Housman

== See also ==
- Heresay (album), by Paul McCandless, 1988
- Heresy (disambiguation)
- Gossip
- Rumor
