= Family Tree (Oregon album) =

Oregon

Studio album by Oregon
- Released: August 28, 2012
- Recorded: 24–28 April 2012
- Studio: Bauer Studios, Ludwigsburg, Germany
- Genre: Jazz, world fusion
- Length: 60:51
- Label: CAM Jazz
- Producer: Ermanno Basso, Oregon

Oregon chronology
In Stride (2010)	Oregon (2012)	Lantern (2017)

Family Tree is an album by American world music/jazz group Oregon featuring Ralph Towner, Paul McCandless, Glen Moore, and Mark Walker recorded in April 2012 and released on the CAM Jazz label. It was the final Oregon recording to feature bassist Glen Moore.

== Reception ==
The Allmusic review by Thom Jurek awarded the album 4 stars stating that "Oregon have remained vital, restless, and disciplined". In his review for All About Jazz, John Kelman concludes "... with Family Tree this sixteen year-old incarnation has delivered an album that easily stands up to recordings like Winter Light (Vanguard, 1973) and Out of the Woods (Elektra, 1978), as one of Oregon's very best."

Professional ratings
Review scores
Source	Rating
Allmusic	4/5 stars
The New York City Jazz Record	(not rated)
All About Jazz	(very favorable)

== Track listing ==
All compositions by Ralph Towner except where noted.

1. "Bibo Babo" — 6:55
2. "Tern" — 5:22
3. "The Hexagram" — 5:54
4. "Creeper" — 5:34
5. "Jurassic" (Oregon) — 2:28
6. "Family Tree" — 6:31
7. "Stritch" (Oregon) — 2:47
8. "Mirror Pond" — 5:53
9. "Moot" (Glen Moore) — 5:48
10. "Julian" (Paul McCandless) — 4:31
11. "Max Alert" (Oregon) — 1:07
12. "Carnival Express" — 8:01

Recorded at Bauer Studios, Ludwigsburg, Germany in April 2012.

== Personnel ==
Musicians

- Paul McCandless - bass clarinet, flute, English horn, oboe, soprano saxophone
- Glen Moore - bass
- Ralph Towner - classical guitar, piano, synthesizer
- Mark Walker - drums, hand percussion, percussion

Production credits

- Andrea Boccalini - photography
- Danilo Rossi - mastering
- Johannes Wohlleben - engineering, mixing
