= Computer World (tour) =

1981 concert tour by Kraftwerk

Computer World Tour
- Tour by Kraftwerk
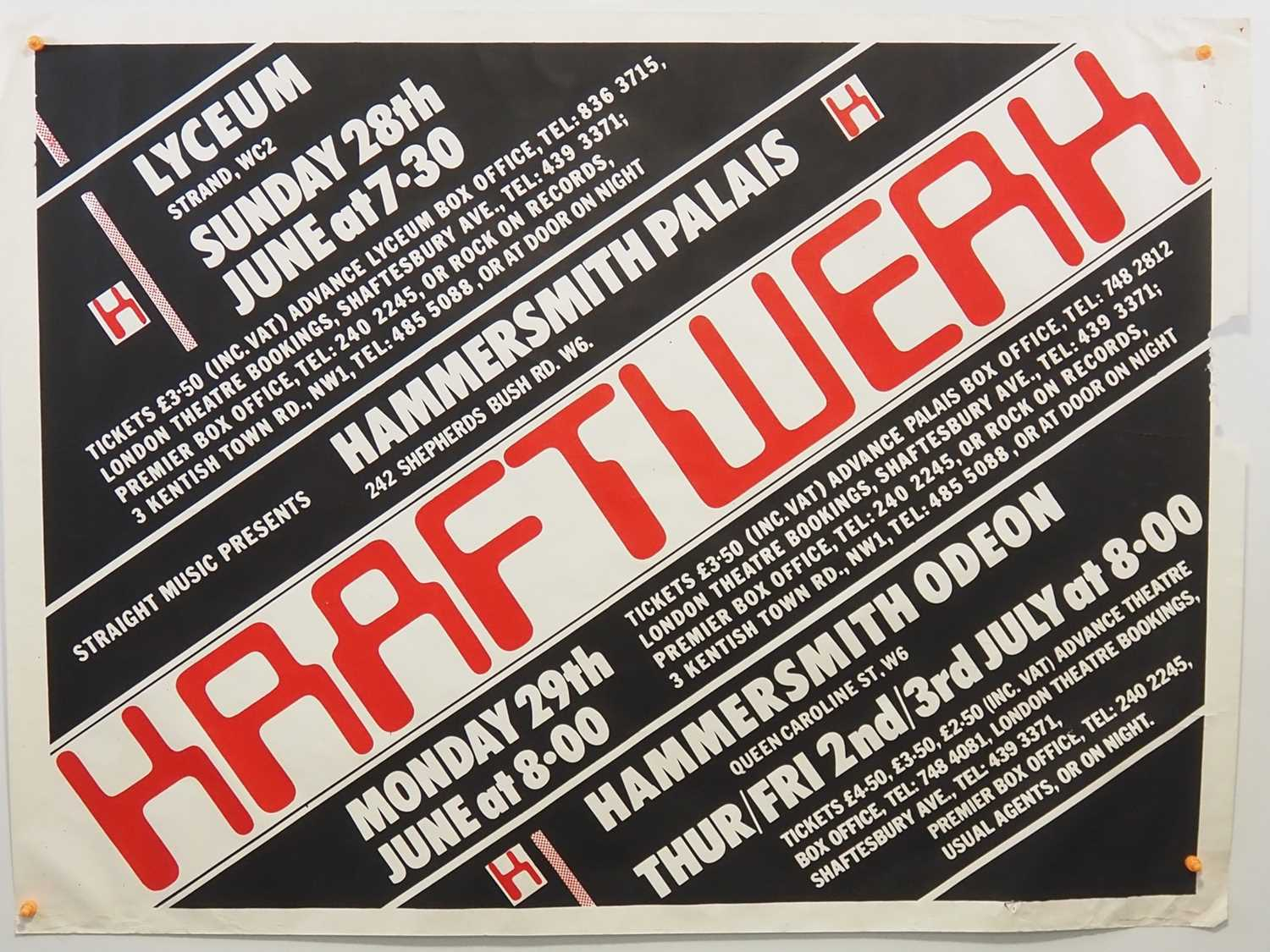
- Poster of the Kraftwerk concert at the Hammersmith Odeon
- Associated album: Computer World
- Start date: 24 May 1981
- End date: 14 December 1981
- No. of shows: 16 in North America; 66 in Europe; 7 in Asia; 5 in Oceania; 94 in total

Following the release of their 1981 album Computer World, Kraftwerk went on a tour that started on 24 May 1981 in Florence, Italy, and ended on 14 December 1981 in Oyten, Bremen, West Germany. The tour took place across Western, Central and Eastern Europe, North America, and Asia-Pacific.

== Equipment ==
Kraftwerk spent the time between the production of The Man-Machine and Computer World designing a new stage setup, which would allow them to bring their Kling Klang Studio on tour.

Ralf Hütter had a stand containing three keyboards; a Minimoog, a Polymoog, and a custom-built keyboard designed to recreate choir noises. Karl Bartos used a custom keyboard which operated a Korg PS-3300 positioned behind him, and occasionally used a homemade set of electronic drum pads. Wolfgang Flür also used a set of homemade electronic drums, and also operated a drum machine designed by a Kraftwerk engineer. Florian Schneider operated the vocoders, played a Prophet synthesizer, and used a self built electronic flute.

== Set lists ==
Early 1981 tour (Italy, France, West Germany)
1. "Intro / Meine Damen und Herren"
2. "Numbers/Computer World"
3. "Computer Love"
4. "Home Computer"
5. "It's More Fun to Compute (Florence, and Rome; Album version)"
6. "The Model"
7. "Neon Lights"
8. "Geigerzähler/Radioactivity"
9. "The Voice of Energy / Uranium / Die Sonne, Der Mond, Die Sterne / Ohm Sweet Ohm"
10. "Autobahn"
11. "Trans Europe Express / Metall Auf Metall / Abzug"
12. "Hall of Mirrors"
13. "Mitternacht / Showroom Dummies"
14. "Pocket Calculator"
15. "The Robots"
Mid-1981 tour (UK, USA, Eastern Europe, Asia-Pacific)
1. "Intro / Meine Damen und Herren"
2. "Numbers/Computer World"
3. "Computer Love"
4. "Home Computer"
5. "The Model"
6. "Neon Lights"
7. "Autobahn"
8. "Geigerzähler/Radioactivity"
9. "The Voice of Energy / Uranium / Die Sonne, Der Mond, Die Sterne / Ohm Sweet Ohm"
10. "Hall of Mirrors / Mitternacht / Showroom Dummies"
11. "Trans Europe Express / Metall Auf Metall / Abzug"
12. "Pocket Calculator / Dentaku (Japan)"
13. "The Robots"
14. "It's More Fun to Compute (modified version)"
Late 1981 tour (Austria/West Germany)
1. "Intro / Meine Damen und Herren"
2. "Nummern/Computerwelt"
3. "Metropolis"
4. "Das Model"
5. "Radioaktivität"
6. "Computerliebe"
7. "Autobahn"
8. "Neonlicht"
9. "Spiegelsaal / Mitternacht / Schaufensterpuppen"
10. "Trans Europa Express / Metall Auf Metall / Abzug"
11. "Taschenrechner"
12. "Die Roboter"
13. "Heimcomputer (modified version with elements from Numbers)"

== Tour dates ==
Date	Country	City	Venue	Notes
24.05.1981	Italy	Florence	Teatro Apollo	
25.05.1981	Italy	Rome	Teatro Tendastrisce	
27.05.1981	Italy	Milan	Palalido	
28.05.1981	Italy	Bologna	Palasport	The concert was cut short, due to weather conditions.
30.05.1981?	France	Marseille	Cinéma Madeleine	Karl Bartos mentions this concert in his book with that of Toulouse
01.06.1981	France	Toulouse	La Halle aux Grains	
02.06.1981	Spain	Barcelona	Palau Blaugrana	
03.06.1981	France	Montpellier	Grand Odéon	
04.06.1981	France	Lyon	Palais D’Hiver	
05.06.1981?	France	Tours	Palais des Sports	
07.06.1981	Belgium	Bruxelles	Ancienne Belgique	
09.06.1981	West Germany	Hamburg	Musikhalle	
10.06.1981	West Germany	West Berlin	Metropol	
12.06.1981	West Germany	Munich	Cirkus Krone	
15.06.1981	United Kingdom	Manchester	Free Trade Hall	
16.06.1981	United Kingdom	Glasgow	Apollo	
17.06.1981	United Kingdom	Edinburgh	Playhouse	
18.06.1981	United Kingdom	Newcastle	Newcastle City Hall	
19.06.1981	United Kingdom	Sheffield	Sheffield City Hall	
20.06.1981	United Kingdom	Liverpool	Royal Court Theatre	
21.06.1981	United Kingdom	Liverpool	Royal Court Theatre	
22.06.1981	United Kingdom	Leicester	De Montfort Hall	
23.06.1981	United Kingdom	Birmingham	Birmingham Odeon	
24.06.1981	United Kingdom	Nottingham	Rock City	
26.06.1981	United Kingdom	Southampton	Gaumont	
27.06.1981	United Kingdom	Brighton	Brighton Dome	
28.06.1981	United Kingdom	Strand	Lyceum	
29.06.1981	United Kingdom	London	Hammersmith Palais	
30.06.1981	United Kingdom	Bristol	The Locarno	
01.07.1981	United Kingdom	Oxford	New Theatre	
02.07.1981	United Kingdom	London	Hammersmith Odeon	
03.07.1981	United Kingdom	London	Hammersmith Odeon	
06.07.1981	France	Paris	Captain Video	
24.07.1981	Canada	Toronto	Concert Hall	
25.07.1981	United States	Detroit	MIT Nitro Rock Club	
27.07.1981	United States	Chicago	Park West	
28.07.1981	United States	Cleveland	Agora Theatre	
30.07.1981	United States	Santa Monica	Civic Auditorium	
01.08.1981	United States	Cherry Hill	Latin Casino	
02.08.1981	United States	Washington DC	Warner Theatre	
03.08.1981	United States	New York City	The Ritz	
04.08.1981	United States	New York City	The Ritz	
xx.1981	United States	Boston	?	
xx.1981	United States	Pittsburgh	?	
xx.1981	United States	Dallas	?	
xx.1981	United States	San Francisco	?	
xx.1981	United States	Long Beach	Long Beach Convention Center	
xx.1981	United States	Los Angeles	?	
07.08.1981	Canada	Montreal	Théâtre Saint-Denis	
14.08.1981	Hungary	Budapest	Kisstadion	16.000 attendance
15.08.1981	Hungary	Budapest	Kisstadion	16.000 attendance, IMFTC was not performed on this night.
18.08.1981	Poland	Katowice	Spodek	
19.08.1981	Poland	Katowice	Spodek	
20.08.1981	Poland	Wrocław	Hala Stulecia	
21.08.1981	Poland	Zielona	Zielona Gora	
23.08.1981	Poland	Sopot	Opera Lesna	
25.08.1981	Poland	Warsaw	Torwar Hall	
26.08.1981	Poland	Oppeln	Amfiteatr Narodowego Centrum Polskiej Piosenk	
07.09.1981	Japan	Nakano	Nakano Sun Plaza	
08.09.1981	Japan	Nakano	Nakano Sun Plaza	
10.09,1981	Japan	Shibuya	Shibuya Kokaido	
11.09.1981	Japan	Osaka	Osaka Festival Hall	
13.09.1981	Japan	Nagoya	Nagoya Shi Kokaido	
16.09.1981	Australia	Sydney	Capitol Theatre	
17.09.1981	Australia	Sydney	Capitol Theatre	
18.09.1981	Australia	Sydney	Capitol Theatre	
19.09.1981	Australia	Melbourne	Princess Theatre	
20.09.1981	Australia	Melbourne	Princess Theatre	
25.09.1981	India	Bombay	Shanmukananda Hall	18:00
25.09.1981	India	Bombay	Shanmukananda Hall	21:30
xx.11.1981	Austria	Linz	Brucknersaal	
19.11.1981	West Germany	Passau	Nibelungenhalle	
20.11.1981	Austria	Salzburg	Kongresshaus	
21.11.1981	Austria	Vienna	Sophiensäle	Partially recorded for Ohne Maulkorb TV show
22.11.1981	West Germany	Regensburg	Audimax	
23.11.1981	West Germany	Mannheim	Musensaal	
24.11.1981	West Germany	Dortmund	Westfalenhalle II	
25.11.1981	West Germany	Braunschweig	Stadhalle	
26.11.1981	West Germany	Kassel	Stadhalle	
28.11.1981	West Germany	Würzburg	Musikhalle	
29.11.1981	West Germany	Roth	Mad Club	
30.11.1981	West Germany	Mainz	Eltzer Hof	
01.12.1981	West Germany	Karlsruhe	Gartenhalle	
02.12.1981	West Germany	Stuttgart	Kongresshalle Boëblingen	
03.12.1981	West Germany	Cologne	Sartorysäle	
03.12.1981	West Germany	Cologne	Sartorysäle	
05.12.1981	West Germany	Düsseldorf	Philipshalle	
06.12.1981	West Germany	Münster	Kongresshalle	
07.12.1981	West Germany	Kiel	Ball Pompös	
08.12.1981	West Germany	Hanover	Rotation	
09.12.1981	West Germany	Frankfurt	Alter Oper	
10.12.1981	The Netherlands	Utrecht	Muziekcentrum Vredenburg	
13.12.1981	Luxembourg	?	?	
14.12.1981	West Germany	Oyten	Zeppelin	Replacement for the cancelled Bremen concert.
