= Codona (album) =

Studio album by Collin Walcott
- Released: 1979
- Recorded: September 1978
- Studio: Tonstudio Bauer; Ludwigsburg, W. Germany
- Genre: Jazz
- Length: 42:37
- Label: ECM; ECM 1132 ST
- Producer: Manfred Eicher

Collin Walcott chronology
Grazing Dreams (1977)	Codona (1979)	Dawn Dance (1981)

Codona chronology
Codona (1979)	Codona 2 (1980)

Codona is an album by the American sitarist and tabla player Collin Walcott, American jazz trumpeter Don Cherry and Brazilian jazz percussionist Naná Vasconcelos (collectively known by the acronym Codona). It was recorded in September 1978 and released on ECM the following year — the first of three self-titled albums by the trio.

== Reception ==
Professional ratings
Review scores
Source	Rating
AllMusic	4/5 stars
The Penguin Guide to Jazz Recordings	3.5/4 stars
The Rolling Stone Jazz Record Guide	3/5 stars
DownBeat	4.5/5 stars

In a review for All About Jazz, John Kelman described the group's philosophy as one "where everything is possible and no single stylistic marker could define its sound and aesthetic", and wrote: "Despite the large improvisational component of Codona ... there's no question that this was a group with a concept. Given the vast number of instruments the trio had to work with, just the matter of choosing the right instruments for each piece suggests that considerable forethought went into all three of the group's recordings.... And while Codona possessed a unique ability to create a surprisingly rich soundscape from the sparest of instrumental combinations ... on record the trio did take advantage of overdubbing to create more expansive audioscapes.... While later Codona releases would be more democratic, compositionally speaking... Codona's original music, other than the self-titled improv, is all from the sitarist/percussionist's pen, with one significant exception. Brief though it may be, at less than four minutes, 'Colemanwonder' is a curious medley of music from Ornette Coleman ('Race Face' and 'Sortie') and Stevie Wonder (his hit single, 'Sir Duke'). The idea of combining Coleman with Wonder may be as oblique as the late T.J. Kirk's combination of Thelonious Monk, James Brown and Rahsaan Roland Kirk, but it works almost in spite of itself, as Vasconcelos' cuica... interacts throughout with Cherry's trumpet and Walcott's sitar."

The AllMusic review by Michael G. Nastos awarded the album 4 stars stating simply "These three communicate."

Tyran Grillo, writing for ECM blog Between Sound and Space, stated the following concerning the opening track: "From the opening gong, this album enchants with its dramaturgy, in which time and space are one and the same. Against clicks and whistles, a subterranean sitar appears. In it, we hear the grumbling of voices. Cherry fills the vast emptiness with his sung trumpeting, so that the emptiness can only weep in return. Walcott's sitar is respectfully articulated, ever so subtle in its reverberant twang, providing a gelatinous backbone, such as it is, for Cherry's more immediate interpretations. From this, we get the tinny call of a clay drum and a flute hooked into every loophole, pulled to expose a more regular core.... Walcott's tabla signals the phenomenological urgency with which divine creation takes form, as if finding amid the contact of fluttering fingers along pulled skin the key to unspeakable life."

Tyran Grillo also wrote, in an article for Jazz Fuel, "ECM Records – 10 Albums That Changed the Landscape of Jazz":

When Codona ... made its self-titled debut in 1979, 'world music' didn't exist as its own category. In retrospect, some have applied the term to Codona's output as the first example of that very genre. Yet saying as much risks stripping away some of the color. They were a plural outfit in every sense: from the fact that all of them played various instruments to their melding of styles and influences into something that transcended the sum of its parts. Cherry's trumpet and Walcott's sitar are a pair for the ages, and find purest traction in every detail Vasconcelos provides. Other instrumental rapports, including that between wooden flute and hammered dulcimer, keep us on our toes as we parse the album's eclectic mix of chants and whispers, while an overarching lucidity grounds even the most metaphysical moments in the immediacy of lived experience.

DownBeat awarded 4.5 stars. Reviewer Bob Henschen wrote, "Certainly Codona is one of the important instrumental concepts of 1979, a meeting of three unique musical minds in an attempt at truly international music".

== Track listing ==
All tracks are written by Collin Walcott except as indicated.

Side I
No.	Title	Writer(s)	Length
1.	"Like That of Sky"		11:07
2.	"Codona"	Cherry; Vasconcelos; Walcott	6:14
3.	"Colemanwonder: Race Face/Sortie/Sir Duke"	Ornette Coleman; Coleman; Stevie Wonder	3:40

Side II
No.	Title	Length
1.	"Mumakata"	8:14
2.	"New Light"	13:22

== Personnel ==
=== Codona ===
- Collin Walcott – sitar, tabla, hammered dulcimer, kalimba, voice
- Don Cherry – trumpet, wood flute, doussn' gouni, voice
- Naná Vasconcelos – percussion, cuica, berimbau, voice
