= Ecotopia (album) =

Studio album by Oregon
- Released: 1987
- Recorded: March 1987
- Studio: Tonstudio Bauer; Ludwigsburg, W. Germany
- Genre: Jazz fusion; new-age
- Length: 48:22
- Label: ECM 1354
- Producer: Manfred Eicher

Oregon chronology
Crossing (1984)	Ecotopia (1987)	45th Parallel (1988)

Ecotopia is an album by jazz fusion band Oregon recorded in March 1987 and released on ECM later that year. The quartet consists reed player Paul McCandless, guitarist Ralph Towner, bassist Glen Moore, and percussionist Trilok Gurtu—replacing Collin Walcott following his accidental death.

== Reception ==
Professional ratings
Review scores
Source	Rating
AllMusic	1.5/5 stars
The Penguin Guide to Jazz Recordings	2.5/4 stars

Reviews of the album were mixed:

The AllMusic review by Thom Jurek states, "there is no excuse for this waste of studio time and Manfred Eicher's energy. It is no wonder that he began the ECM New Series a few years before, given the junk churned out by some of label's stable between 1983 and 1988, and this record is a stellar example. Simply put, this is a trite, new age piece of dreck slopped out by a group of musicians whose combined creativity should always take them to stellar heights. There are no redeeming tracks on this disc, and few redeeming moments."

Writing in progarchives.com, Ian Alterman called the album "the perfect mixture of Oregon compositions... In my opinion, Ecotopia is the group's best post-Walcott album, and among my favorite "progressive jazz" albums of all time."

== Track listing ==
All compositions by Ralph Towner except as indicated

1. "Twice Around the Sun" – 10:31
2. "Innocente" – 6:24
3. "WBAI" (Trilok Gurtu, Paul McCandless, Glen Moore, Ralph Towner) – 2:02
4. "Zephyr" – 5:55
5. "Ecotopia" – 5:06
6. "Leather Cats" (Glen Moore, Samantha Moore) – 7:39
7. "ReDial" – 5:59
8. "Song of the Morrow" (Collin Walcott) – 5:16

== Personnel ==
- Paul McCandless – soprano saxophone, oboe, English horn; wind driven synthesizers on "WBAI"
- Ralph Towner – classical guitar, 12 string guitar, piano, Prophet-10 synthesizer; drum machine on "Twice Around the Sun"
- Glen Moore – bass
- Trilok Gurtu – tabla, percussion
