= Bird on a Wire (Tim Hardin album) =

Studio album by Tim Hardin
- Released: June 1971
- Genre: Folk
- Length: 36:06
- Label: Columbia (CK-30551)
- Producer: Ed Freeman

Tim Hardin chronology
Suite for Susan Moore and Damion: We Are One, One, All in One (1969)	Bird on a Wire (1971)	Painted Head (1972)

Bird on a Wire is an album by folk artist Tim Hardin, released in 1971. It was Hardin's second release on Columbia Records. It peaked at No. 189 on the Billboard Pop Album charts and was his last album to chart.

== Background ==
Hardin had one of his few commercial successes with his single of Bobby Darin's "Simple Song of Freedom", which reached the US Top 50. He did not tour in support of the single and failed to capitalize on its success. For his second Columbia release, producer Ed Freeman had most of the backing tracks recorded in advance for Hardin to later come to the studio and perform his vocals. Although Hardin later considered it one of his best performances, calling it "good clean superiority", the album did not sell well. Shortly after its release, Hardin moved to England. In contrast to Hardin's previous releases where he had written all his own material, Bird on a Wire includes cover songs for four of the ten tracks. By this time, his drug addictions were beginning to take a larger toll on his live performances and songwriting output. It was his last recording done in the US.

The sessions featured contributions from numerous jazz musicians including Joe Zawinul, Miroslav Vitouš and Alphonse Mouzon of Weather Report, Glen Moore, Ralph Towner and Collin Walcott of Oregon, and future Peter Gabriel/King Crimson bass guitarist Tony Levin (at the time, still working mainly in the jazz and fusion field).

Bird on a Wire was re-issued on CD by Sony in 1989 and Sony Japan in 2005.

== Reception ==
Professional ratings
Review scores
Source	Rating
Allmusic	3/5 stars

In his review for Allmusic, music critic Bruce Eder wrote "The singing is exquisite, poignant, and powerful and the production is as tasteful and eloquent as any in Hardin's output. This might not be the place to start listening to Tim Hardin (though there are worse places for that as well) in terms of finding out what he was about, but it's also as essential as anything in his output and a lot closer to the core of who he was than, say, Tim Hardin 4."

== Track listing ==
All tracks composed by Tim Hardin; except where indicated

=== Side one ===
1. "Bird on the Wire" (Leonard Cohen) – 5:29
2. "Moonshiner" (Trad.) – 3:15
3. "Southern Butterfly" – 2:53
4. "A Satisfied Mind" (Joe Hayes, Jack Rhodes) – 2:07
5. "Soft Summer Breeze" – 2:59

=== Side two ===
1. "Hoboin'" (John Lee Hooker, Joe Josea; arranged by Joe Zawinul) – 3:28
2. "Georgia on My Mind" (Hoagy Carmichael, Stuart Gorrell; arranged by Joe Zawinul) – 4:33
3. "André Johray" (arranged by Bill Chelf) – 2:50
4. "If I Knew" – 3:55
5. "Love Hymn" – 4:37

== Personnel ==
- Tim Hardin – vocals, guitar, keyboards
- Joe Zawinul – keyboards
- Warren Bernhardt – keyboards
- Sam T. Brown – guitar
- Bill Chelf – keyboards
- Ed Freeman – guitar, string and horn arrangements
- Monte Dunn – guitar
- Steve Haas – drums, percussion
- Paul Hornsby – keyboards
- Bill Keith – pedal steel guitar
- Tony Levin – bass
- Glen Moore – bass
- Richard Bock – cello
- George Ricci – cello
- Margaret Ross – harp
- Ralph MacDonald – drums, percussion
- Natoga (Daniel Ben Zebulon) – drums, percussion
- Alphonse Mouzon – drums, percussion
- Mike Mainieri – vibraphone, background vocals
- The Canby Singers – background vocals
- Robert Popwell – bass
- Rob Rothstein – bass
- Joe Rudd – guitar
- Bill Stewart – drums, percussion
- Gilles Malkine – guitar
- Ralph Towner – guitar
- Miroslav Vitouš – bass
- Collin Walcott – vibraphone, background vocals

== Production notes ==
- Produced by Bob Devere and Ed Freeman
- Engineered by Jim Greene, Lacy O'Neal, Doug Pomeroy
- Mastered by Lous Schlossberg
