= Crossing (album) =

Studio album by Oregon
- Released: 1985
- Recorded: October 1984
- Studio: Tonstudio Bauer; Ludwigsburg, West Germany
- Genre: Chamber jazz, ethno jazz, folk jazz, world fusion, jazz fusion, new-age
- Length: 48:40
- Label: ECM 1291
- Producer: Manfred Eicher

Oregon chronology
Oregon (1983)	Crossing (1985)	Ecotopia (1987)

Crossing is an album by jazz fusion band Oregon recorded in October 1984 and released on ECM the following year. The quartet features guitarist Ralph Towner, reed player Paul McCandless, bassist Glen Moore, and percussionist Collin Walcott—their final album with Walcott, who died a month after its recording.

== Reception ==
The AllMusic review by Ron Wynn stated: "Ethereal playing with tremendous solos".

Professional ratings
Review scores
Source	Rating
AllMusic	3/5 stars
The Penguin Guide to Jazz Recordings	2.5/4 stars

== Track listing ==
All compositions by Ralph Towner except as indicated

1. "Queen of Sydney" (Paul McCandless) - 8:17
2. "Pepé Linque" (Glen Moore) - 4:21
3. "Alpenbridge" - 6:31
4. "Travel by Day" (Collin Walcott) - 4:23
5. "Kronach Waltz" (Moore) - 3:08
6. "The Glide" - 6:13
7. "Amaryllis" (McCandless) - 8:55
8. "Looking-Glass Man" - 4:26
9. "Crossing" - 3:13

== Personnel ==
- Paul McCandless - soprano saxophone (tracks 2, 6, 8, 9), oboe (tracks 1, 3, 7), bass clarinet (tracks 2, 5), English horn (tracks 7)
- Glen Moore - bass (tracks 1–4, 6–9), flute (track 1), piano (track 5)
- Ralph Towner - classical guitar (tracks 3, 9), 12 string guitar (tracks 4, 7), piano (tracks 1, 2, 6, 8, 9), Prophet-5 synthesizer (tracks 1–3, 6, 7, 9), cornet (tracks 2, 5, 6), percussion (track 9)
- Collin Walcott - percussion (tracks 1, 2, 6, 7, 9), tabla (tracks 1, 2, 6), sitar (tracks 3, 4), bass drum (tracks 5), snare drum (tracks 5)
