= Painted Head =

Studio album by Tim Hardin
- Released: 1972
- Recorded: Apple Studios, London; Starday-King Studios, Nashville, Tennessee; A&R Studios and CBS Studios, New York City
- Genre: Folk
- Length: 45:01
- Label: Columbia (CK-31764)
- Producer: Tony Meehan

Tim Hardin chronology
| Bird on a Wire (1971) | Painted Head (1972) | Nine (1973) |

Painted Head is an album by folk artist Tim Hardin, recorded in England and released in 1972. It was Hardin's last release on Columbia Records.

== Background ==
Hardin had moved to England in February, 1972 after the release of his album Bird on a Wire. While there he was undergoing methadone treatment for his heroin addiction. The sessions included British session musicians as well as guest Peter Frampton. The album sold poorly and his contract with Columbia was terminated.

There are no original songs on Painted Head. It was re-issued by BGO Records in 2007 on CD.

== Reception ==
Professional ratings
Review scores
| Source | Rating |
|---|---|
| Allmusic | 3/5 stars |

In his review for Allmusic, music critic James Chrispell wrote "This is a much different album for Tim Hardin, but it is much better than most would have thought... While Painted Head isn't that great an album, it shows that Hardin was trying to reel in his excesses and give his career some much-needed discipline."

== Track listing ==
=== Side one ===
1. "You Can't Judge a Book by the Cover" (Willie Dixon) – 4:12
2. "Midnight Caller" (Pete Ham) – 3:09
3. "Yankee Lady" (Jesse Winchester) – 4:27
4. "Lonesome Valley" (Traditional) – 4:29
5. "Sweet Lady" (Dino and Sembello) – 3:47

=== Side two ===
1. "Do the Do" (Willie Dixon) – 4:20
2. "Perfection" (Pete Ham) – 3:03
3. "Till We Meet Again" (Neil Sheppard) – 3:13
4. "I'll Be Home" (Randy Newman) – 5:43
5. "Nobody Knows You When You're Down and Out" (Jimmy Cox) – 6:38

== Personnel ==
- Tim Hardin – vocals, acoustic guitar, keyboards
- Peter Frampton – electric guitar
- Don Brooks – harmonica
- Rebop Kwaku Baah – conga drums
- Tony Carr – cowbell
- Alun Davies – acoustic guitar
- Tristan Fry – vibraphone, background vocals
- The Cissy Houston Singers – vocals on "Do The Do"
- Liza Strike – background vocals
- Bobbie Whittaker – vocals on "I'll Be Home"
- Dennis Lopez – percussion, timbales
- Tony Meehan – organ, piano, percussion, chimes, drums, vibraphone, string, horn, choir, woodwind arrangements
- Rod Murfield – maracas
- Larry Packer – fiddle
- Alan Ross – guitar, mandolin
- Jean Roussel – organ, piano, keyboards
- Bruce Rowland – drums
- Jeff Schwartz – pedal steel guitar
- Neil Shepherd – piano, harmonium
- Chris Stewart – bass
- 21st Century Singers – choir on "I'll Be Home"
- David Katz – conductor

Technical

- Geoff Emerick – recording engineer, remixing
- Elliot Scheiner, James Green, Lehman Yates, Michael Stone – overdubs
- Teresa Alfieri – cover design
- Cliff Condak – cover artwork
