= In Concert (Oregon album) =

Live album by Oregon
- Released: 1975
- Recorded: live before an invited audience at Vanguard´s Studio in New York City on April 8 & 9, 1975
- Genre: Jazz
- Length: 42:36
- Label: Vanguard
- Producer: Oregon

Oregon chronology
Winter Light (1974)	In Concert (1975)	Together (1976)

In Concert is a live album by the American jazz group Oregon released in 1975. The album peaked at number 35 on the Billboard Jazz Albums chart in 1976.

== Reception ==
Professional ratings
Review scores
Source	Rating
Allmusic	4/5 stars
The Penguin Guide to Jazz Recordings	3/4 stars

In a review for AllMusic, Ron Wynn awarded the album 4 stars, writing: "A textbook live recording by Oregon... It contains their usual classical, African, and jazz elements and shows that they're more aggressive and animated in performance than in the studio. The recording is excellent and fully displays the broad range of colors, rhythms, and textures that they present. The authors of The Penguin Guide to Jazz commented: "'Silence Of A Candle' is absolutely magisterial, and even more abstract pieces... underline that what Oregon was best at was real-time improvisation... Walcott's influence on the group is even more obvious in a concert setting. There is rarely a moment when he is not shaping or reshaping the music."

== Track listing ==
Side one

1. "Introduction" (Georg Schutz) – 0:42
2. "Become, Seem, Appear" (Oregon) – 6:36
3. "Summer Solstice" (Ralph Towner) – 9:46
4. "Undertow" (Paul McCandless) – 3:43

Side two

1. "The Silence Of A Candle" (Ralph Towner) – 9:53
2. "Tryton´s Horn" (Oregon) – 5:01
3. "Yet To Be" (Ralph Towner) – 6:55

== Personnel ==
Musicians

- Paul McCandless – bass clarinet, English horn, oboe, wooden flute
- Glen Moore – bass, flute, violin, piano on "Tryton´s Horn"
- Ralph Towner – 12 String guitar, classical guitar, mellophone, French horn, trumpet, piano on "Yet To Be"
- Collin Walcott – sitar, tabla, clarinet, percussion, congas

Other credits

- Jeff Zaraya – engineering & mixing
- Rafael Ravira – cover design

== Charts ==
Chart (1976)	Peak position
US Billboard Jazz Albums	35
