= Collin Walcott =

American sitar and tabla player (1945–1984)

- Born: April 24, 1945; New York City, U.S.
- Died: November 8, 1984 (aged 39) Magdeburg, East Germany
- Genres: Jazz; world
- Occupation: Musician
- Instruments: Sitar; tabla
- Years active: 1967–1984
- Label: ECM
- Website: Official website (archived)

Collin Walcott (April 24, 1945 – November 8, 1984) was an American sitar and tabla player in the jazz and world music genres.

== Early life ==
Walcott was born in New York City, United States. He studied violin and timpani in his youth and was a percussion student at Indiana University School of Music. After graduating in 1966, he attended the University of California, Los Angeles and studied sitar under Ravi Shankar and tabla under Alla Rakha.

== Later life and career ==
According to critic Scott Yanow of AllMusic, Walcott was "one of the first sitar players to play jazz". Walcott moved to New York and played "a blend of bop and oriental music with Tony Scott" in 1967–69. Around 1970, he joined the Paul Winter Consort and co-founded the band Oregon. These groups, along with the trio Codona, which was founded in 1978, combined "jazz improvisation and instrumentation with elements of a wide range of classical and ethnic music".

Walcott also played on the Miles Davis album On the Corner in 1972, had three releases under his own name on ECM Records, and taught at the Naropa Institute in Boulder, Colorado.

Walcott was killed in a bus crash in Magdeburg, East Germany, on November 8, 1984, while on a tour with Oregon.

Author David James Duncan wrote retrospectively in 1996 about an Oregon concert he attended in Cascade Head in his piece "My One Conversation with Collin Walcott". Duncan described Walcott as sitting "buddha-style" on stage, surrounded by instruments. Along with an electronic drum kit "to his north", Walcott "had five different tablas to his south, a sitar to his east and a bewildering semicircle of rattles, chimes, clackers, bells, whistles, finger-drums, triangles and unnameable noisemakers to his west. He was the first Western 'jazz' percussionist I'd ever seen sit flat on the floor like an East Indian."

== Discography ==
=== As leader ===
- 1976: Cloud Dance (ECM 1062)
- 1977: Grazing Dreams (ECM 1096)
- 1981: Dawn Dance (ECM 1198) with Steve Eliovson
- 1988: Works (ECM/Polygram 837 276) – compilation

With Oregon

- 1970: Our First Record CD (Universe 42)
- 1973: Music of Another Present Era CD (Vanguard VMD-79326)
- 1974: Winter Light CD (Vanguard VMD 79350)
- 1974: Distant Hills CD (Vanguard VMD-79341)
- 1975: In Concert CD (Universe 25)
- 1976: Together CD (Universe 9) with Elvin Jones
- 1977: Friends CD (Vanguard 79370-2)
- 1978: Out of the Woods CD (Discovery 71004)
- 1978: Violin CD (Universe 40)
- 1979: Moon and Mind CD (Vanguard VMD 79419)
- 1979: Roots in the Sky CD (Discovery 71005)
- 1980: In Performance CD (Wounded Bird 304)
- 1983: Oregon (ECM)
- 1984: Crossing (ECM)

With Codona

- Codona (rec. 1978, rel. April 1979) ECM 1132
- Codona 2 (rec. 1980, rel. February 1981) ECM 1177
- Codona 3 (rec. 1982, rel. February 1983) ECM 1243

With The Rainbow Band

- The Rainbow Band (Elektra, 1971)

=== As sideman ===
Within his brief career, Walcott played with a range of different musicians of different styles and contributed to the following albums:

With David Amram

- Subway Night (RCA Victor, 1973)

With Bobby Callender

- Rainbow (MGM Records, 1968)

With Don Cherry

- Hear & Now (Atlantic, 1977)

With Larry Coryell

- The Restful Mind (Vanguard, 1975)

With Cosmology

- Cosmology (Elektra, 1971)

With David Darling

- Cycles (ECM, 1981)

With Miles Davis

- On the Corner (Columbia, 1972)

With Rachel Faro

- Refugees (RCA Victor, 1974)

With Cyrus Faryar

- Cyrus (Elektra, 1971)
- Islands (Elektra, 1972)

With Egberto Gismonti

- Sol do Meio Dia (ECM, 1978)

With Tim Hardin

- Bird on a Wire (Columbia 1971)

With Richie Havens

- Richard P. Havens, 1983 (Verve, 1969)

With Dave Liebman

- Drum Ode (ECM, 1974)

With Alan Lorber Orchestra

- The Lotus Palace (Big Beat Records, 1967)

With Meredith Monk

- Key (Increase/Lovely Music, 1971)
- Our Lady of Late (Minona/WERGO, recd. 1972, publ. 1973)
- Dolmen Music (ECM, 1981)
- Turtle Dreams (ECM, 1983)

With Jim Pepper

- Comin' and Goin' (Rykodisc, 1983)

With Vasant Rai

- Spring Flowers (Universe, 1976)
- Autumn Song (Universe, 1978)

With Alla Rakha

- Tabla Solo (Vanguard, 1977)

With Tony Scott

- Music for Yoga Meditation and Other Joys (Verve, 1968)
- Tony Scott (Verve, 1970)

With Titos Sompa

- Yao! Titos Sompa with the Tanawa Dance Company (Vanguard, 1978) [production only]

With Ralph Towner

- Trios / Solos (ECM, 1973) with Glen Moore

With Barry Wedgle

- Kake (Wonderful World Records, 1982)

With Elyse Weinberg

- Elyse (Orange Twin, 1968)

With Paul Winter

- Road (A&M, 1971)
- Icarus (Epic, 1972)

== See also ==
- Sitar in jazz
