= Codona 2 =

Studio album by Collin Walcott / Don Cherry / Naná Vasconcelos
- Released: 1981
- Recorded: May 1980
- Genre: Jazz
- Length: 39:11
- Label: ECM; ECM 1177 ST
- Producer: Manfred Eicher

Collin Walcott / Don Cherry / Naná Vasconcelos chronology
Codona (1978)	Codona 2 (1981)	Dawn Dance (1981)

Codona chronology
Codona (1978)	Codona 2 (1981)	Codona 3 (1982)

Don Cherry chronology
Playing (1980)	Codona 2 (1981)	El Corazón (1982)

Naná Vasconcelos chronology
Saudades (1980)	Codona 2 (1981)	Codona 3 (1982)

Codona 2 is an album by American sitarist and tabla player Collin Walcott, American jazz trumpeter Don Cherry and Brazilian jazz percussionist Naná Vasconcelos (collectively known by the acronym Codona) recorded in May 1980 and released on ECM the following year—the second of three self-titled albums by the trio.

== Reception ==
Professional ratings
Review scores
Source	Rating
AllMusic	3.5/5 stars
The Penguin Guide to Jazz Recordings	3/4 stars
The Rolling Stone Jazz Record Guide	3/5 stars

The AllMusic review by Michael G. Nastos called the album "absolutely uplifting".

John Kelman, writing for All About Jazz, commented:

Codona 2 represented a number of changes for the group which, by the time of its release in 1981, was nearly four years old... a brief traditional African tune, 'Godumaduma,' takes Codona into completely new territory—a solo feature for Walcott's sitar, overdubbed multiple times to create a pulsing, propulsive piece informed by classical composer Steve Reich's concept of pulses." Kelman noted that the recording was "critically pegged as the trio's least engaging album" but stated that "years passed, distance and the opportunity to hear the album chronologically in between its two brethren makes clear that it's an album unfairly undervalued and well worthy of reconsideration.

In an article for ECM blog Between Sound and Space, Tyran Grillo praised the album's closing piece, and wrote: "'Again and Again, Again'... might as well be our listening instructions for this most underrated album of the set. Sitar and trumpet provide some vivid runes, of which Vasconcelos makes a sonic rubbing with a string of sounds not unlike a tape in fast forward, if not a dreaming bird. Add to this the plurivocity of a melodica, and one begins to see subtle density and 'vocal' qualities that make this one of the group's most inward-looking statements."

== Track listing ==
Side I
No.	Title	Writer(s)	Length
1.	"Que faser"	Vasconcelos	7:07
2.	"Godumaduma"	Traditional	1:54
3.	"Malinye"	Cherry	12:39

Side II
No.	Title	Writer(s)	Length
1.	"Drip-Dry"	Ornette Coleman	6:59
2.	"Walking on Eggs"	Walcott	3:00
3.	"Again and Again, Again"	Walcott	7:32

== Personnel ==
=== Codona ===
- Collin Walcott – sitar, tabla, mbira, timpani, voice
- Don Cherry – trumpet, melodica, doussn' gouni, voice
- Naná Vasconcelos – percussion, talking drum, berimbau, voice
