= Lillian Leitzel =

German-American acrobat and entertainer (1892–1931)

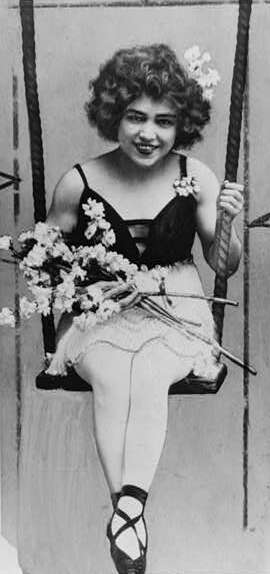
- Lillian Leitzel in 1931
- Born: Leopoldina Alitza Pelikan; 2 January 1892; Breslau, Germany
- Died: 15 February 1931 (aged 39); Copenhagen, Denmark
- Known for: Trapeze; Acrobatics
- Spouses: Clyde Ingalls, 1920-?; Alfredo Codona July 20, 1928-death

Lillian Leitzel (born Leopoldina Alitza Pelikan; 2 January 1892 – 15 February 1931) was a German-born acrobat who specialized in performing on the Roman rings, for the Ringling Brothers and Barnum and Bailey Circus. The inaugural (posthumous) inductee to the International Circus Hall of Fame, Leitzel died in hospital two days after a fall during a live performance.

== Early life ==
Leitzel was born as Leopoldina Alitza Pelikan in a family of circus performers. Her father was most likely Willy Dosta, an itinerant circus performer; another possible candidate was Edward J. Eleanore, a Hungarian army officer and theater performer. Her mother, Nellie Pelikan, was a Czech circus acrobat. Nellie was one of 6 children born to Eduard Pelikan, an acrobat/clown/strongman. Eduard's son Adolf performed as a clown under the pseudonym "Bluch Landolf". Lillian's brother, Alfred Pelikan, later became director of the Milwaukee Art Institute.

She spent her childhood in Germany, where she lived with her maternal grandparents. Although she had been well-educated and had prepared to pursue a career as a concert pianist, she joined her mother's aerobatic circus group, the Leamy Ladies. The troupe was completed by Lily Simpson and Leitzel's aunts, Tina and Toni Pelikan. The group toured Europe in 1905.

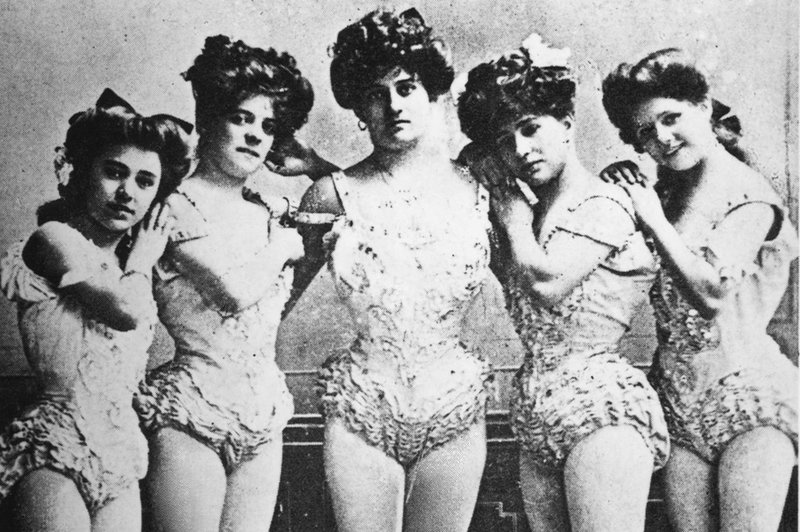
"The Leamy Ladies (Lillian Leitzel at left) in 1905.

In 1910, she came to the United States with the circus troupe and performed with Barnum and Bailey. The group later dissolved and its members returned to Europe, but Leitzel continued to attempt to perform in the American vaudeville circuit. In South Bend, Indiana, she was seen by an agent of the Ringling Brothers who offered her a contract. When Ringling and Barnum and Bailey merged, she became a huge star and a headline performer for the circus.

== Act and personality ==
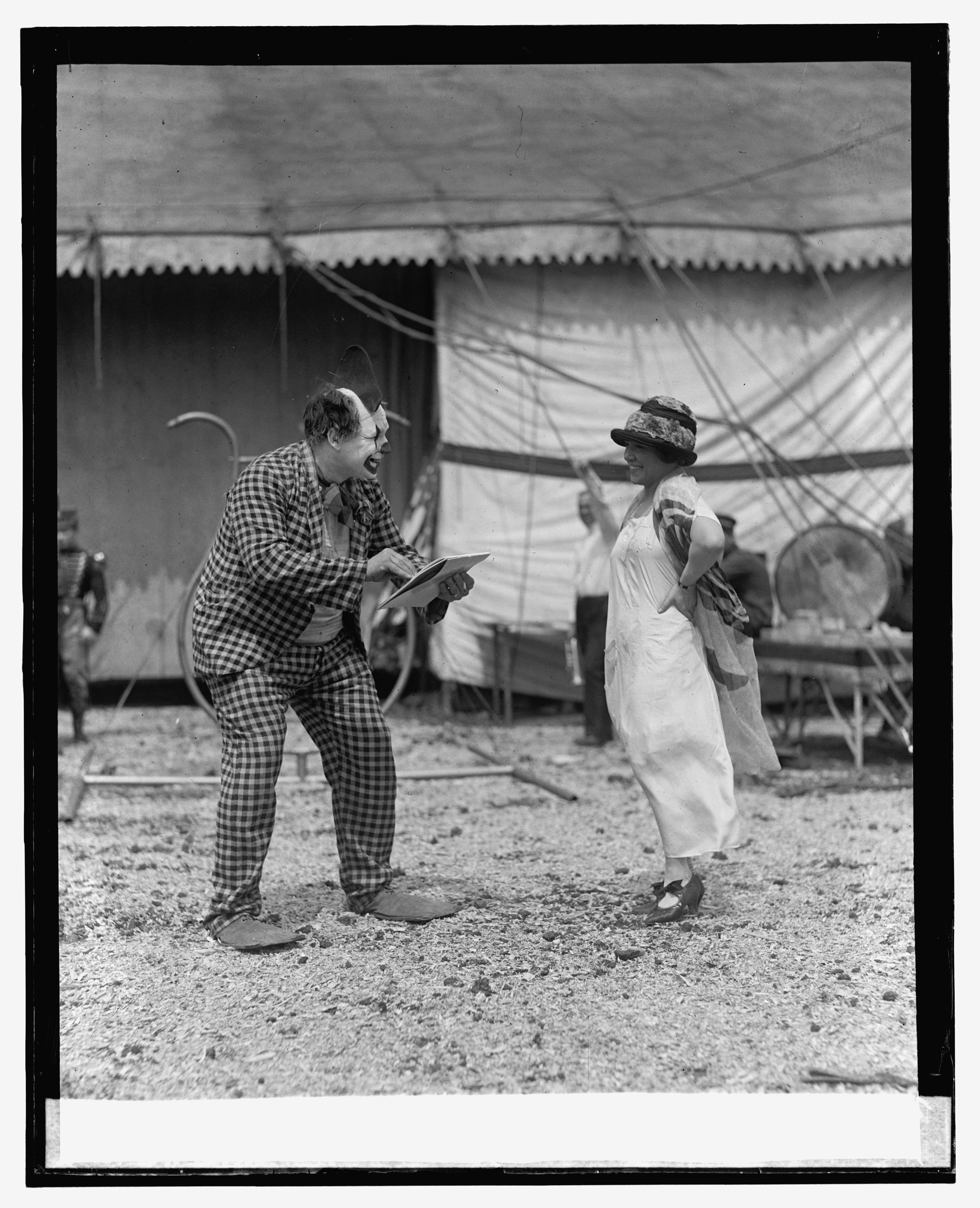
Leitzel performing in 1925

Leitzel's act included one-armed planges, momentarily dislocating the shoulder during each plange. She would flip her body over her shoulder repeatedly, sometimes hundreds of times in a feat of endurance, encouraging the audience to count each one in unison. Only four feet, nine inches, she was also famous for her demanding personality and temper. Leitzel was the first performer in history to command her own private Pullman car completely furnished with her own baby grand piano.

Florenz Ziegfeld, Jr. actively pursued Leitzel for his show. She agreed to terms and performed for the Ziegfeld Midnight Frolic in 1918 and 1919.

Her quick temper was legendary. It was not uncommon to witness Leitzel cursing or slapping a roustabout who did not adjust her rigging exactly to her liking. Further, Leitzel was known to fly off the handle and fire then rehire her personal maid, Mabel Cummings, several times a day. In sharp contrast, she was known to the children on the show as "Auntie Leitzel", and she would hold birthday parties for her fellow performers in her private dressing tent.

== Marriages ==
The identity of her first husband is unknown. She married Clyde Ingalls in 1920, and the couple divorced in 1924. Her third husband was circus trapeze performer Alfredo Codona, whom she wed in 1928.

== Accident and death ==
On 13 February 1931, she fell to the ground from her rigging while performing in Copenhagen, Denmark at the Valencia Music Hall, when the swivel that held the rope in place fractured and snapped. She and Codona had been performing in Europe separately, and he rushed to Copenhagen. After she apparently showed signs of improvement, Codona returned to his company in Berlin. However, she died on 15 February, two days after the fall, aged 39. She was buried in Inglewood Park Cemetery in Inglewood, California.

== Honors ==
Lillian Leitzel was the first inductee elected into the International Circus Hall of Fame in 1958.

A vintage circus poster depicting her was used as the subject of a United States postage stamp issued as part of a set on 5 May 2014.

== In media ==
The book Queen of the Air: A True Story of Love and Tragedy at the Circus by Dean N. Jensen, is about Lillian Leitzel. It was published by Crown in 2013 (ISBN 030798656X/ISBN 978-0307986566).
