= Out of the Woods (Oregon album) =

Studio album by Oregon
- Released: April 1978
- Genre: Jazz
- Length: 42:37
- Label: Elektra
- Producer: Oregon

Oregon chronology
Violin (1977)	Out of the Woods (1978)	Roots in the Sky (1978)

Out of the Woods is a studio album by the American jazz group Oregon, released in April 1978. The album peaked at number 17 on the Billboard Jazz Albums chart the same year.

== Critical reception ==
Professional ratings
Review scores
Source	Rating
All About Jazz	(very favorable)
AllMusic	4/5 stars
DownBeat	5/5 stars

The Bay State Banner wrote that "Oregon's acoustic beauty and mastery of such difficult reed instruments as the English horn and the oboe are impressive, as are the harmonic abilities of guitarist Ralph Towner."

DownBeat reviewer Douglas Clark wrote, "The writing here is rich and varied, never cliched. The ensemble playing is extraordinarily cohesive, like a virtuoso string quartet. Each individual plays his instruments with imagination and solid technique. There is not a weak cut on this entire album... It is in every way a work of art".

== Track listing ==
1. "Yellow Bell" (Ralph Towner) – 7:02
2. "Fall 77" (Glen Moore) – 4:26
3. "Reprise" (Ralph Towner) – 1:02
4. "Cane Fields" (Paul McCandless) – 4:35
5. "Dance to the Morning Star" (Collin Walcott) – 5:36
6. "Vision of a Dancer" (Ralph Towner) – 4:03
7. "Story Telling" (Collin Walcott) – 1:03
8. "Waterwheel" (Ralph Towner) – 6:26
9. "Witchi-Tai-To" (Jim Pepper) – 8:24

== Personnel ==
Musicians

- Ralph Towner – piano, flugelhorn, 12-string guitar, classical guitar
- Paul McCandless – bass clarinet, English horn, oboe
- Glen Moore – bass, guitar
- Collin Walcott – sitar, guitar, percussion, tabla

Other credits

- Hayward Connor – liner notes
- Ron Coro – design
- Joe Gastwirt – mastering
- David Greene – engineer
- Jesse Henderson – associate engineer
- Johnny Lee – design
- Matt Murray – associate engineer
- Boe Overlock – photography
- David Wilcox – illustrations

== Charts ==
Year	Chart	Position
1978	Billboard Jazz Albums	17
