= All the Mornings Bring =

Studio album by Paul McCandless
- Released: 1979
- Genre: Jazz
- Label: Elektra Records
- Producer: Paul McCandless, George Schutz, David Greene

Paul McCandless chronology
All the Mornings Bring (1979)	Navigator (1982)

Professional ratings
Review scores
Source	Rating
The Encyclopedia of Popular Music	3/5 stars
DownBeat	4/5 stars

All the Mornings Bring is an album by the American jazz instrumentalist Paul McCandless, recorded in 1979 for the Elektra label. It was re-released in 2010 by Wounded Bird Records.

== Production ==
McCandless spent four years working on All the Mornings Bring. The Oxford Companion to Jazz noted McCandless's improvisational talents on English horn and oboe.

== Critical reception ==
The Santa Cruz Sentinel called the album "unique," writing that McCandless "has somewhat bridged the gap between classical and jazz music."

== Track listing ==
1. "St. Philomene" - 10:19
2. "Bowspirit" - 2:55
3. "On, Elf Bird!" - 5:12
4. "Slumber Song" - 3:04
5. "Palimpsest" - 5:47
6. "All The Mornings Bring" - 4:42
7. "Saraband" - 2:57
8. "Song For One" - 0:55
9. "Moon And Mind" - 7:36

- Recorded January 1979, Longview Farms, North Brookfield, Massachusetts, and Columbia 30th Street Studio, New York City.

== Personnel ==
- Paul McCandless - bass clarinet, flute, English horn, oboe
- David Samuels - vibraphone, marimba, percussion
- Doren Glickman - bassoon
- Loren Glickman - bassoon
- Eddie Gomez - bass guitar
- Peter Gordon - French horn
- Walter Kane - clarinet
- Art Lande - percussion, piano
- Jennifer Sperry - English horn, oboe
- David Tofani - clarinet
