= Heresy (disambiguation) =

Heresy is any belief or theory that is strongly at variance with established beliefs or customs.

Heresy may also refer to:

== Music ==
- Heresy (band), an English hardcore punk band

=== Albums ===
- Heresy (Lustmord album), 1990
- Heresy (Paradox album), 1989

=== Songs ===
- "Heresy" (Rush song), 1991
- "Heresy", a song by Pantera from the 1990 album Cowboys from Hell
- "Heresy", a song by Nine Inch Nails from the 1994 album The Downward Spiral

== Other uses ==
- Heresy (radio series), a British comedy talk show
- Heresy: Kingdom Come, a collectible card game
- The Heresies Collective, an American feminist collective
  - Heresies: A Feminist Publication on Art and Politics, a second wave feminist magazine (1977–1993) by the Heresies Collective
- Heresy, a 2001 novel in the Aquasilva Trilogy by Anselm Audley

== See also ==
- Hearsay (disambiguation)
- Heretic (disambiguation)
