= Trios / Solos =

Trios/Solos

Studio album by Ralph Towner
- Released: 1973
- Recorded: November 27–28, 1972
- Studio: Sound Ideas Studios; New York City
- Genre: Jazz
- Length: 36:01
- Label: ECM 1025 ST
- Producer: Manfred Eicher

Ralph Towner chronology
Trios/Solos (1973)	Diary (1973)

Trios / Solos is an album by American jazz guitarist Ralph Towner with Glen Moore recorded over two days in November 1972 and released on ECM June the following year. The session features guest appearances from tabla player Collin Walcott and oboist Paul McCandless.

== Reception ==
At AllMusic, critic Thom Jurek gave the album four stars, stating, "While Trios/Solos has its moments of pure unadulterated noodling yawn, there are more than enough dimensions where the four elements meet and spark to compensate."

Professional ratings
Review scores
Source	Rating
AllMusic	4/5 stars
The Rolling Stone Jazz Record Guide	4/5 stars
The Penguin Guide to Jazz Recordings	3.5/4 stars

== Track listing ==
All tracks are written by Ralph Towner, except as noted.

Side I
No.	Title	Writer(s)	Length
1.	"Brujo"		5:34
2.	"Winter Light"		3:35
3.	"Noctuary"	McCandless; Moore; Towner	2:22
4.	"1 × 12"		2:48
5.	"A Belt of Asteroids"	Glen Moore	6:37

Side II
No.	Title	Writer(s)	Length
1.	"Re: Person I Knew"	Bill Evans	6:19
2.	"Suite: 3 × 12"		7:12
3.	"Raven's Wood"		5:20
4.	"Reach Me, Friend"		3:26

== Personnel ==
=== Musicians ===
- Ralph Towner – twelve-string guitar, classical guitar, piano (tracks 1–4 & 6–9)
- Glen Moore – bass (tracks 1, 3, 5, 6 & 8)

=== Additional musicians ===
- Paul McCandless – oboe (tracks 3 & 8)
- Colin Walcott — tabla (track 1)

=== Technical personnel ===
- Manfred Eicher – producer
- George Klabin – recording engineer
- Martin Wieland – mixing
- B & B Wojirsch – cover design
- H. Paysan, Ken Kay – photography
