= Blue from Heaven =

Studio album by Pierluigi Balducci
- Released: December 2012
- Recorded: April 2012
- Genre: Jazz
- Length: 44:00
- Label: Dodicilune
- Producer: Gabriele Rampino

Blue from Heaven is a jazz album by Italian bassist Pierluigi Balducci with a quartet featuring Paul McCandless, John Taylor and Michele Rabbia. The album was released by the Italian label Dodicilune in December 2012.

== Reception ==
All about jazz review awarded the album 5 stars writing that "at just under 44 minutes, Blue from Heaven seems to pass by in an instant, but if there's truth in the adage "leave them hungry for more," Balducci succeeds in spades. He may have done so with musicians possessing considerably greater cachet, but throughout Blue from Heaven, this evocative and provocative bassist/composer is never less than a full-on and absolute equal."

== Track listing ==
No.	Title	Music	Length
1.	"Introduction"	Pierluigi Balducci	1:18
2.	"The Light of Seville"	Balducci	4:14
3.	"Fin de siècle"	Balducci	4:33
4.	"Unrequited"	Brad Mehldau	5:42
5.	"Life in Three Sketches"	Balducci	5:10
6.	"Blue from Heaven"	Balducci	4:32
7.	"The Sky over Skye"	Balducci	5:05
8.	"L'equilibrista" (for Ernst Reijseger)	Balducci	4:18
9.	"Our Spanish Love Song"	Charlie Haden	4:49
10.	"The Light of Seville, Take 2"	Balducci	5:30

== Personnel ==
- Paul McCandless - soprano saxophone, oboe
- John Taylor - piano
- Pierluigi Balducci - electric bass
- Michele Rabbia - drums, percussion
