= Codona =

Free jazz and world fusion ensemble

- Genres: Free jazz World fusion
- Years active: 1978–1982
- Label: ECM
- Past members: Don Cherry; Nana Vasconcelos; Collin Walcott

Codona was a free jazz and world fusion group which released three self-titled albums on the ECM label in 1979, 1981 and 1983. The trio consisted of multi-instrumentalists Don Cherry, Collin Walcott, and Nana Vasconcelos. The name of the group was derived from the first two letters of the musicians' first names (COllin, DOn, NAna).

The members of the group declared that their goal was "to be open and incorporate all we know, without turning the whole world into milk toast - still encouraging the survival of the traditions". Critic Robert Palmer stated that the group's "self-appointed mission is to fuse African, Indian and other music traditions in the heat of improvisation". The authors of The Penguin Guide to Jazz on CD called the group's debut album "one of the iconic episodes in so-called (but never better called) 'world music'", and stated: "Any tendency to regard Codona's music... as floating impressionism is sheer prejudice, for all these performances are deeply rooted in modern jazz (Coltrane's harmonies and rhythms, Ornette Coleman's melodic and rhythmic primitivism) and in another great and related improvisational tradition from Brazil."

== Background ==
The musicians had crossed paths on a number of occasions prior to the formation of the group in 1977. Vasconcelos appeared on Cherry's album Organic Music Society, recorded and released in 1972, while Walcott played on Cherry's Hear & Now, recorded in 1976 and released in 1977. Cherry also appeared on Walcott's Grazing Dreams, recorded and released in 1977, while both Walcott and Vasconcelos played on Egberto Gismonti's Sol do Meio Dia, recorded in 1977 and released in 1978. The members' involvement with Codona overlapped with their participation in other projects, Cherry with Old and New Dreams, Walcott with Oregon, and Vasconcelos with Pat Metheny, Milton Nascimento, Jan Garbarek, Jon Hassell, and others. Although the group was conceived as a leaderless trio, Walcott was the organizer and primary composer.

Codona was noted for its use of a broad range of instrumentation. While Cherry was primarily known as a trumpet and cornet player, he also performed on various flutes, organ, melodica, and the Malian doussn’gouni. Walcott played sitar, tabla, hammered dulcimer, sanza, and timpani, while Vasconcelos performed on berimbau, cuica, talking drum, and a variety of percussion instruments. In addition, all three musicians sang. The group was also known for its unusual arrangements, an example being "Colemanwonder", a medley of two Ornette Coleman tunes combined with Stevie Wonder's "Sir Duke", performed on trumpet, sitar, cuica, and percussion, and appearing on the group's debut album.

The group disbanded following Walcott's death in a traffic accident in East Germany in 1984.

== Discography ==
- 1979: Codona (ECM 1132)
- 1981: Codona 2 (ECM 1177)
- 1983: Codona 3 (ECM 1243)
- 2009: The Codona Trilogy (ECM 2033-35) (3-disc reissue of above titles)
