= Alfredo Codona =

Mexican trapeze artist

Alfredo Codona (October 7, 1893 – July 30, 1937) was a Mexican trapeze artist who was a member of the world-famous "Flying Codonas" and was the first aerialist to continually perform the triple somersault. Alfredo came from an itinerant performing family whose origins lie with the Codoni family in the Italian speaking area of Canton Ticino in southern Switzerland.

== Background and early life ==
The original Codoni family name evolved around 1840 into the name Codona, which is widely recognised in Punch and Judy, circus and of fairground folklore - Codona is practically a household name in the entertainment business in Scotland where the family owns a large static fairground site in Aberdeen and other members of the family travel around the country with portable amusement rides.

John Codoni (Codona) and Elizabeth Hart gave birth in 1835 to Alfredo's grandfather Henry (Enrique) Codoni, before travelling to America where a very young Enrique stayed on but the rest of the family went back to Scotland. Enrique and a young French artiste, Victorine, had two children, one of whom was Alfredo's father Eduardo. Codona was born in Sonora, Mexico, to a circus trapeze family that became famous in the Ringling Brothers Circus. His father owned their circus and his mother, Hortense Buislay, came from a great family of trapeze performers. He began appearing in the circus at 7½ months when his father, a flyer, balanced him on his hand for the opening act. By 1913 Eduardo had formed a family act that included Alfredo, his brother Abelardo (known as Lalo), and his sister Victoria.

== Personal life ==
Alfredo married his first wife, Clara Curtin (also an aerialist) in 1917 after she left her husband. They were divorced in 1927. In 1928 Codona married aerialist Lillian Leitzel, who died in 1931, aged 39, in Copenhagen, Denmark when one of her hand rings snapped and she fell to a concrete floor. Both were tempestuous, star performers whose personalities were well matched. Alfredo was famed for his triple somersault, which he regularly incorporated in his act. He was the first male performer to do so.

Codona later married a member of their trapeze act, Vera Bruce, in 1932. He was featured in the 1932 film Swing High and was stunt double for Johnny Weissmuller in Tarzan the Ape Man as well as its sequel Tarzan and His Mate. Alfredo continued to incorporate extremely dangerous stunts into his act and in 1933, he suffered an injury that prevented high aerial acts in the circus and retired from the trapeze in 1934.

== Death ==
Codona's distress about his second wife's death and inability to perform led to the deterioration of his third marriage. On July 30, 1937, he committed suicide by gunshot in Long Beach, California, after shooting his third wife, Vera Bruce, during a division of their property in front of her horrified mother (newspaper accounts of the day incorrectly stated that Vera was his second wife). She died the next day. Codona was buried at Inglewood Park Cemetery beside Leitzel's grave at his request.

== Legacy ==
He was portrayed by René Deltgen in the 1940 German film The Three Codonas

Alfredo Codona was inducted into the International Circus Hall of Fame in 1961.
