= Glen Moore =

American jazz bassist

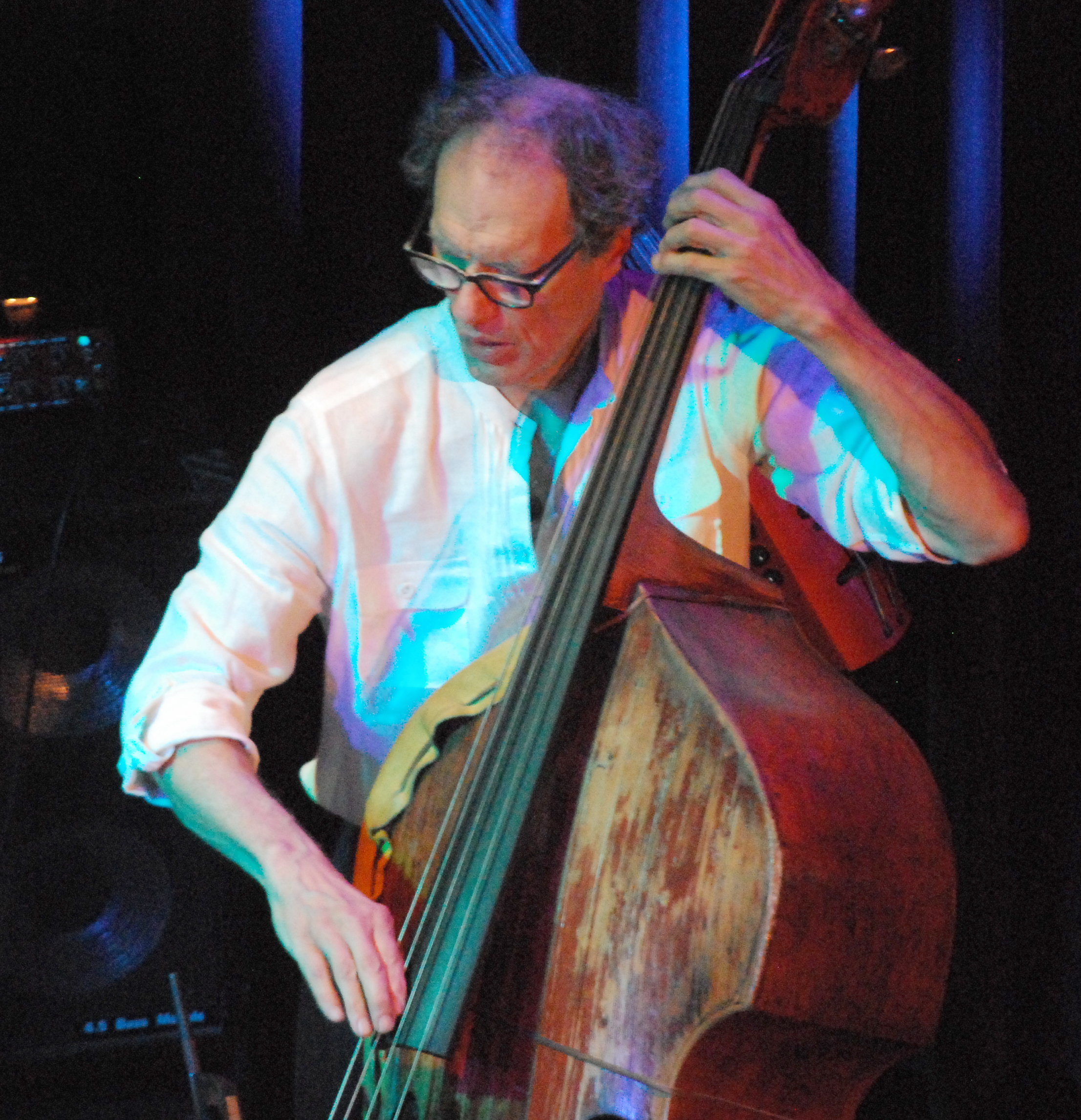
- Performing in concert with Oregon; Treibhaus, Innsbruck, 2010

Background information
- Born: October 28, 1941 (age 84); Portland, Oregon, U.S.
- Genres: Jazz
- Occupation: Instrumentalist
- Instruments: Double bass; piano; flute; violin
- Years active: 1955–present

Glen Moore (born October 28, 1941) is an American jazz bassist, who occasionally performs on piano, flute and violin.

Moore was born in Portland, Oregon, United States. His performing career began at age 14 with the Young Oregonians in Portland, where he met and played with Native American saxophonist Jim Pepper. He graduated with a degree in History and Literature from the University of Oregon. His formal bass instruction started after college with Jerome Magil in Portland, James Harnett in Seattle, Gary Karr in New York, Plough Christenson in Copenhagen, Ludwig Streicher in Vienna, and Francois Rabbath in Hawaii.

Moore's main instrument is an upright bass that was made by Klotz in Tyrol around 1715. He mostly plays it in a personal unique tuning, using a low and a high C string.

Moore is a founding member of the group Oregon, but worked also regularly with Rabih Abou-Khalil, Vasant Rai, Nancy King and Larry Karush.

== Discography ==
- Trios / Solos, with Ralph Towner (ECM, 1972)
- May 24, 1976, with Larry Karush (JAPO/ECM, 1976)
- In Concert, with David Friesen (Vanguard, 1977)
- Introducing Glen Moore (Elektra, 1979)
- Mokave Volume 1 (Audioquest, 1991)
- Mokave Volume 2 (Audioquest, 1992)
- Returning, with David Friesen (Burnside, 1995)
- Forces of Flight (ITM, 1995)
- Dragonetti's Dream (Intuition, 1996)
- Nude Bass Ascending (Intuition, 1999)

With the Paul Winter Consort

- Road (1970)

With Oregon

- Our First Record (Vanguard, recorded 1970, released 1980)
- Music of Another Present Era (Vanguard, 1972)
- Distant Hills (Vanguard, 1973)
- Winter Light (Vanguard, 1974)
- In Concert (Vanguard, 1975)
- Together (Vanguard, 1976), with Elvin Jones
- Friends (Vanguard, 1977)
- Violin (Vanguard, 1978), with Zbigniew Seifert
- Moon and Mind (Vanguard, 1979)
- Out of the Woods (Elektra, 1978)
- Roots in the Sky (Elektra, 1979)
- In Performance (Elektra, 1980)
- Oregon (ECM, 1983)
- Crossing (ECM, 1984)
- Ecotopia (ECM, 1987)
- 45th Parallel (Intuition, 1989)
- Always, Never, and Forever (Intuition, 1991)
- Troika (Intuition, 1993)
- Beyond Words (Intuition, 1995)
- Northwest Passage (Intuition, 1997)
- Music for a Midsummer Night's Dream (the Oregon Trio) (Intuition, 1998)
- In Moscow (Intuition, 2000), with the Moscow Tchaikovsky Symphony Orchestra
- Live at Yoshi's (Intuition, 2002)
- Prime (CAM Jazz, 2005)
- The Glide (CAM Jazz, 2005)
- 1000 Kilometers (CAM Jazz, 2007)
- In Stride (CAM Jazz, 2010)
- Family Tree (CAM Jazz, 2012)

With Rabih Abou-Khalil

- Al-Jadida (Enja, 1990)
- Between Dusk and Dawn (1986)
- Bukra (1988)
- Tarab (Enja, 1993)
- Roots and Sprouts (1990)

With King & Moore

- Impending Bloom (1990), with Rob Thomas, Jerry Hahn, Lawrence Williams
- Cliff Dance (1991), with Warren Rand, Art Lande, Gary Hobbs
- Potato Radio (1992), with Bennie Wallace, Art Lande, Gary Hobbs
- King on the Road (1999), with Rob Scheps

=== As sideman ===
- This Is It (1967), with Nick Brignola
- This Is Jeremy Steig (Solid State, 1969), with Jeremy Steig
- Bass Is (1970), with Dave Holland, Jamie Faunt, Peter Warren
- Revenge: Bley Peacock Synthesizer Show (1970), with Annette Peacock, Paul Bley
- The Paul Bley Synthesizer Show (1971), with Paul Bley
- Bird on Wire (1971), with Tim Hardin
- I'm the One (1972) Annette Peacock
- The Restful Mind (1975), with Larry Coryell
- Spring Flowers (1976) Vasant Rai
- No Age (1987) Minimal Kidds
- Afrique (Sledgehammer Blues, 1993), with Larry Karush and Glen Velez
- Birdfingers (2002), with Larry Coryell
