= Heretic (disambiguation) =

A heretic is a person who commits heresy.

Heretic or The Heretic may also refer to:

== Epithet ==
=== Real ===
- Jacob the Heretic, faith healer in the Talmud and Tosefta

=== Fictional ===
- Camber the Heretic, a 1981 novel by Katherine Kurtz
- Flavia the Heretic, a 1974 Italian-French film
- "Homer the Heretic", a 1992 episode of The Simpsons

== Film, TV and theatre ==
- Exorcist II: The Heretic, a 1977 American horror film
- Heretic (TV series), 1994 BBC series on six eminent scientists including Eric Laithwaite and Rupert Sheldrake
- Heretic (play), a 1996 play by David Williamson
- The Heretic (Bean play), a 2011 play by Richard Bean
- The Heretics (2009 film), an American documentary film
- The Heretics (2017 film), a Canadian horror film
- Heretiks, another name for a 2018 British film The Convent
- Heretic (film), a 2024 American horror thriller film

== Literature ==
- The Heretic: A Novel of the Inquisition, a 1998 novel by Miguel Delibes
- The Heretic (poem), a 1845 poem by Taras Shevchenko
- Heretic (novel), the third novel in The Grail Quest series by Bernard Cornwell
- Heretic: Why Islam Needs a Reformation Now, a 2015 book by Ayaan Hirsi Ali
- Heretics (book), a 1905 essay collection by G. K. Chesterton
- Heretic, a 1994 autobiographical book by Peter Cameron
- The Heretics, upcoming 2027 sequel to the fantasy novel The Devils

== Music ==
- Heretic (band), an American speed and thrash metal band

=== Albums ===
- Heretic (Morbid Angel album), 2003
- Heretic (Naked City album), 1991
- Heretics (Toadies album), 2015
- The Heretics (album), a 2019 album by Rotting Christ

=== Songs ===
- "Heretic", a song by Avenged Sevenfold from the 2013 album Hail to the King
- "Heretic", a song by Bury Tomorrow from the 2023 album The Seventh Sun
- "Heretic", a song by Haste the Day from the 2026 album Dissenter
- "Heretic", a song by Soundgarden from the 1986 album Deep Six

== Other uses ==
- Heretic (ballet), a 1929 ballet by Martha Graham
- Heretic (comics), a DC Comics character
- Heretic (video game), a 1994 dark fantasy video game
  - Heretic II, a 1998 video game sequel
- Heretic Films, an American film production company
- The Heretics Society, a group at Cambridge University which questioned traditional authorities and religious dogmas

== See also ==
- Heresy (disambiguation)
