= Grazing Dreams =

1977 studio album by Collin Walcott

Studio album by Collin Walcott
- Released: 1977
- Recorded: February 1977
- Studio: Talent Studio; Oslo, Norway
- Genre: Jazz
- Length: 46:19
- Label: ECM; ECM 1096 ST
- Producer: Manfred Eicher

Collin Walcott chronology
Cloud Dance (1976)	Grazing Dreams (1977)	Dawn Dance (1981)

Grazing Dreams is the second album by American sitarist and composer Collin Walcott, recorded in February 1977 and released on ECM later that year. Walcott's quintet features trumpeter Don Cherry and rhythm section John Abercrombie, Palle Danielsson, and Dom Um Romão.

== Reception ==
Professional ratings
Review scores
Source	Rating
AllMusic	4.5/5 stars
The Penguin Guide to Jazz	3.5/4 stars
The Rolling Stone Jazz Record Guide	2/5 stars

Writing for All About Jazz, John Kelman called the album "a truly deep recording that makes Walcott's death in a car accident while on tour with Oregon... all the more tragic", and noted that Walcott was "truly one of the earliest musicians to explore the integration of music from other cultures into an improvised jazz setting."

The Penguin Guide to Jazz Recordings states, "The quartet format ... inevitably anticipates Walcott's and Cherry's work with Codona, and the long 'Song of the Morrow' is a perfect encapsulation of the group's idiom."

In a post on ECM blog Between Sound and Space, Tyran Grillo wrote: "Grazing Dreams is structured as long-form whole in which individual tracks blend into the overarching power that binds them," and commented: "The engineering of this album is ahead of its time. Considering the way each track evolves, an attuned sensibility was clearly required to bring out the music's full breadth. Case in point: the way the buzzing solitude that opens 'Gold Sun' gradually develops into a honeyed elaboration of sitar and bass is nothing short of astonishing. Each tune is spun from the same cloth, dyed in real time with the languid syncopation of improvisers who feel what they hear. Gentility through strength is the backbone of Grazing Dreams, a poignant and timeless statement spun from the ether of dreams."

== Track listing ==
All tracks are written by Collin Walcott except as indicated.

Side I: Changeless Faith
No.	Title	Writer(s)	Length
1.	"Song of the Morrow"		9:15
2.	"Gold Sun"	Don Cherry; Collin Walcott	7:03
3.	"The Swarm"		6:09
4.	"Mountain Morning"		1:58
Total length:			24:25

Side II
No.	Title	Writer(s)	Length
1.	"Jewel Ornament"	Cherry; John Abercrombie; Walcott	5:04
2.	"Grazing Dreams"		6:53
3.	"Samba Tala"	Dom Um Romão; Walcott	1:30
4.	"Moon Lake"		8:27
Total length:			21:54 46:19

== Personnel ==
=== Musicians ===
- Collin Walcott – sitar, tabla
- Don Cherry – trumpet, wood flute, doussn' gouni
- John Abercrombie – guitar, electric mandolin
- Palle Danielsson – bass
- Dom Um Romão – percussion, tambourine, berimbau

=== Technical personnel ===
- Manfred Eicher – producer
- Jan Erik Kongshaug – recording engineer
- Henry Riedel – mastering
- Dieter Bonhorst – layout
- Franco Fontana – photography
