= Codona 3 =

Studio album by Collin Walcott / Don Cherry / Naná Vasconcelos
- Released: 1983
- Recorded: September 1982
- Studio: Tonstudio Bauer; Ludwigsburg, W. Germany
- Genre: Jazz
- Length: 46:04
- Label: ECM; ECM 1243
- Producer: Manfred Eicher

Codona chronology
Codona 2 (1980)	Codona 3 (1983)

Codona 3 is the third and final album by jazz trio Codona—featuring sitarist and tabla player Collin Walcott, trumpeter Don Cherry and percussionist Naná Vasconcelos—recorded in September 1982 and released on ECM the following year.

== Reception ==
Professional ratings
Review scores
Source	Rating
AllMusic	4/5 stars
The Penguin Guide to Jazz Recordings	3/4 stars
The Rolling Stone Jazz Record Guide	3/5 stars

In his AllMusic review, Bruce Eder called the album "a sublimely beautiful release" and "a joyously stunning last testament for Walcott, who died not long after these recordings were completed".

Robert Palmer commented that the album continued the group's "singular odyssey", and stated that "they expand their scope with borrowings from ancient Japan and a country blues accompanied by Mr. Cherry's West African hunter's harp. The result is somewhat diffuse, but at its best it is ethereal and captivating."

Regarding the opening track, John Kelman, writing for All About Jazz, stated: "Cherry's trumpet is the primary voice, with Walcott's hammered dulcimer creating a spacious and ethereal backdrop where empty space is, indeed, as profound and meaningful as anything the members of the group specifically play. It makes a case, in fact, for the idea that space can be an equal consideration in the creation of a musical landscape, rather than simply being less than anticipated gaps between notes. The power of silence is what makes the tune's final section, with Vasconcelos providing greater forward motion with his hand percussion, so vivid and dramatic." Kelman also noted that Vasconcelos's tune "Trayra Boia" is "Codona at its most experimental, with layers of conversational voices interspersed with cued melodies and falsetto singing."

Tyran Grillo, in an article for Between Sound and Space, wrote: "The traditional Japanese 'Goshakabuchi'... turns the mirror just so, flashing a glint into our eyes from a distance. Cherry's brassy ether drips with sympathetic effect; hammered dulcimer hurls its delicate, insectile hiccups; untold lives tease us with their possibilities. This is perhaps the most haunting and coalescent track in the collection and shows the trio at the height of its signature synergy. Sanza and doussn'gouni back the chant-heavy 'Hey Da Ba Boom,' which will adhere to your mind far more than any words I might use to describe it here. 'Travel By Night' trailmarks its path with berimbau, sitar, and muted trumpet. Walcott's arcing tones make for quiet narration. Hooded by the darkened firmament, it practically floats with the practiced steps of a modest caravan fleeing from its own histories. A trio of shorter rest stops follows, of which 'Lullaby,' the only moment with Walcott alone, gives us a heartening glimpse into the mind of group's creative nerve center. 'Clicky Clacky' provides a dash of whimsy, a bluesy gem from the mind and mouth of Cherry, complete with train whistle. The final gasp comes from the 'Inner Organs,' where the echoes of trumpet and, not surprisingly, organ move in concert like a jellyfish and its tendrils toward open closure."

== Track listing ==
All tracks are written by Collin Walcott, except as noted.

Side I
No.	Title	Writer(s)	Length
1.	"Goshakabuchi"	Traditional	10:55
2.	"Hey Da Ba Doom"		7:13
3.	"Travel by Night"		5:55

Side I
No.	Title	Writer(s)	Length
1.	"Lullaby"		3:34
2.	"Trayra Boia"	Denise Milan; Vasconcelos	5:19
3.	"Clicky Clacky"	Cherry	4:10
4.	"Inner Organs"	Cherry	9:17

=== Note ===
- Excerpts from Vasconcelos's composition "Trayra Boia" appeared on U2's song "Last Night on Earth", which was included on their 1997 album Pop.

== Personnel ==
=== Codona ===
- Collin Walcott – sitar, tabla, hammered dulcimer, sanza, voice
- Don Cherry – trumpet, organ, doussn' gouni, voice
- Naná Vasconcelos – percussion, berimbau, voice
