= Rockstore =

Former religious building in Montpellier, France

Coordinates: 43.6062°N 3.8813°E

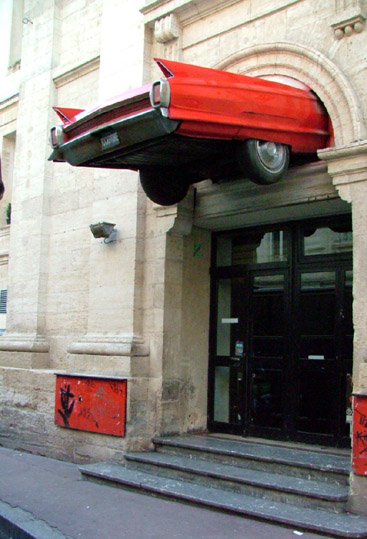
Rockstore

The Rockstore, formerly known as the Grand Odéon, is a 1,000-capacity concert hall located in Montpellier, France. It was classified a monument historique in 2007. Some of the artists that performed at the venue include Blue Öyster Cult, Motörhead, Melissa Etheridge, Hole and Metallica.
