= Pierluigi Balducci =

- Born: 3 October 1971 (age 54); Bari, Italy
- Genres: Jazz
- Occupation: Musician
- Instruments: Bass guitar, double bass
- Years active: 1991–present
- Labels: Splasc(h), Dodicilune

Pierluigi Balducci (born 3 October 1971) is an Italian jazz musician and composer, specializing in electric bass.

He performed at numerous festivals and Jazz clubs throughout Europe and Asia and has collaborated with Ernst Reijseger, Luciano Biondini, Paul McCandless, John Taylor, Gabriele Mirabassi, Javier Girotto, Nuevo Tango Ensamble. He wrote the sound track for Catherine Breillat's film Fat Girl, which was shown at the Berlin International Film Festival (2001).

== Discography ==
- Niebla (Splasc(h) 2000)
- Il peso delle nuvole (Splasc(h), 2003)
- Leggero (Dodicilune, 2007)
- Stupor Mundi (Dodicilune, 2008)
- Blue from Heaven (Dodicilune, 2012)
- Evansiana (Dodicilune, 2017)
- Electric Wood (2020)

== Bibliography ==
- 2009 – Pierluigi Balducci: Bach on the bass – The first cello suite transcribed and fingered for 5 and 4 string electric bass (Salatino Edizioni Musicali)
