= Victoria Codona Adolph =

Mexican circus performer (1891–1983)

Victoria Codona Adolph (1891–1983) was a fourth generation circus performer from the Codonas family.

She was born in Vera Cruz, Mexico, to French and English parents. She performed in Mexican circuses as a slackwire artist. In 1909, agents of the Barnum & Bailey Circus recruited her and her younger brothers, Alfredo and Abelardo Codona, to perform with them. She worked for Barnum & Bailey until 1918 and also performed in Australia with the Brothers Circus. She was known as Princess Victoria and was a wire-walker.

She retired from performing when she was pregnant with her first child with William K. Adolph, a race car driver, and they retired to Palm Springs where she died in 1983 at the age of 92. In 2014, the U.S. Postal Service created a stamp of her as part of an eight stamp collection paying tribute to circus legends of the past.
