= Premonition (Paul McCandless album) =

Studio album by Paul McCandless
- Released: 1992
- Recorded: October–December 1991
- Genres: New-age, jazz fusion
- Label: Windham Hill
- Producers: Paul McCandless, Steve Rodby

Paul McCandless chronology
Heresay (1988)	Premonition (1992)

Premonition is an album by the American jazz instrumentalist Paul McCandless, recorded in 1992 for Windham Hill Records.

== Critical reception ==
Professional ratings
Review scores
Source	Rating
AllMusic	3/5 stars

The Washington Post noted that the music falls in "the emotionally evocative but unchallenging territory that lies between new age and fusion." The Gazette determined that "at times the dreaded contemporary beat moves into MoR territory."

== Track listing ==
1. "Robin" - 3:54
2. "Punch" - 5:48
3. "Rainland" - 4:53
4. "Two Moons" - 5:32
5. "At First Sight" - 4:36
6. "Winter Creeper" - 4:56
7. "Last Bloom" - 3:01
8. "Rendezvous" - 4:26
9. "Can't Stop the Wind" - 5:13
10. "Premonition" - 2:17
11. "Turning to You" - 5:28
12. "Robin Reprise" - 1:14

- Recorded and mixed October - December 1991 at Chicago Recording Co., Chicago, IL, October 1991

== Personnel ==
- Paul McCandless – English Horn, oboe, soprano sax, synthesizer
- Steve Rodby – Bass
- Gary Brown – Electric bass
- John Burr – Keyboards
- Steve Cardenas – Guitar
- William Kennedy – Drums
- Lyle Mays – Piano
- Fred Simon – Synthesizer
- Mark Walker – Drums, percussion
- Rich Breen – Recording engineer, mix engineer
