= Paul McCandless =

American jazz musician

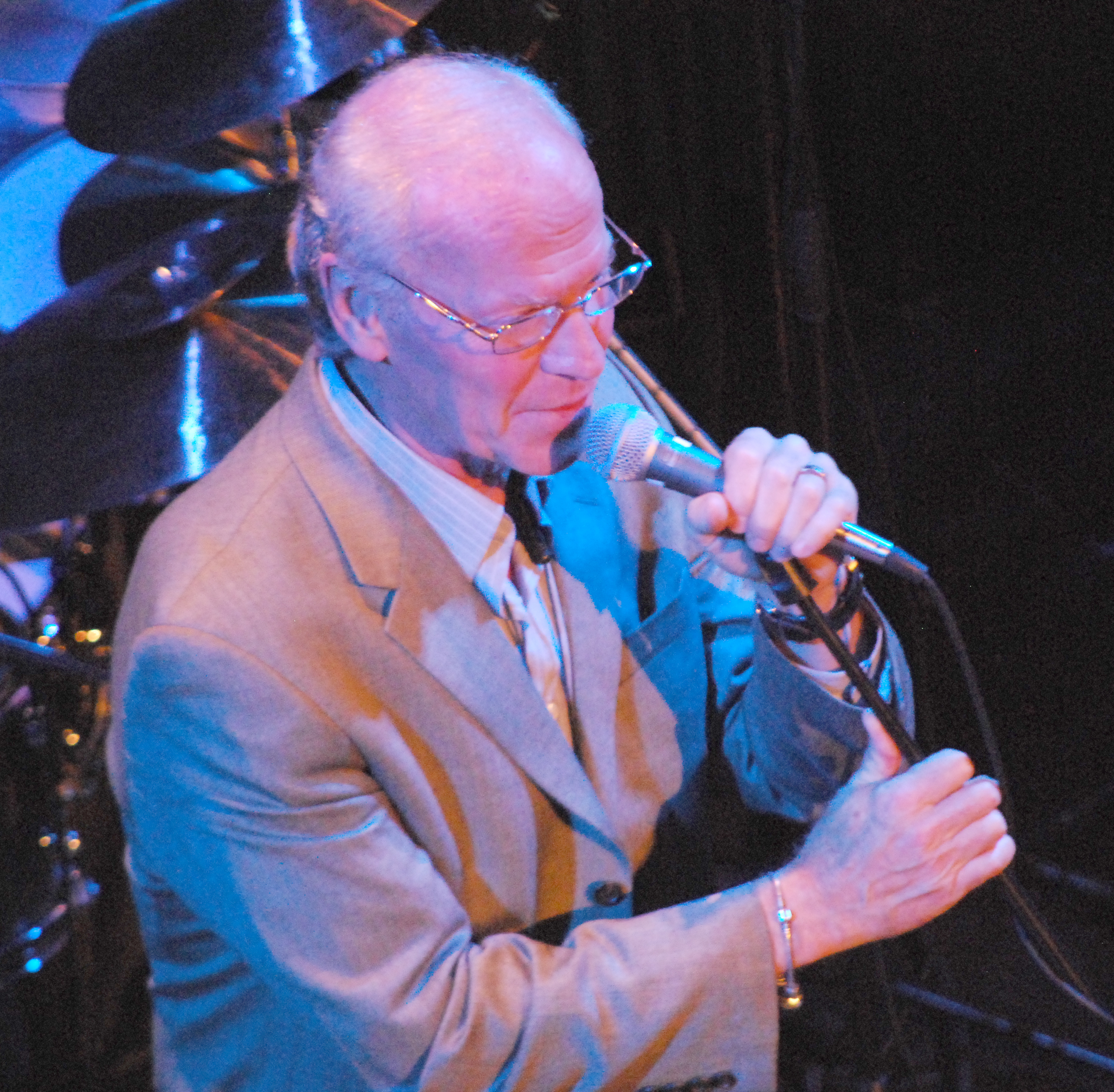
- McCandless with Oregon in Treibhaus, Innsbruck, 2010

Background information
- Born: Paul Brownlee McCandless Jr. March 24, 1947 (age 79); Indiana, Pennsylvania, U.S.
- Genres: Jazz, folk jazz, new age
- Occupation: Musician
- Instruments: Oboe, bass clarinet, soprano saxophone, English horn
- Years active: 1968–present
- Labels: Atlantic, Windham Hill, Vanguard, ECM
- Website: paulmccandless.com

Paul Brownlee McCandless Jr. (born March 24, 1947) is an American multi-instrumentalist and founding member of the American jazz group Oregon. He is one of the few jazz oboists. He also plays bass clarinet, English horn, flute, penny whistle, tenor saxophone, sopranino saxophone, and soprano saxophone.

== Biography ==
Paul Brownlee McCandless Jr. was born in Indiana, Pennsylvania, United States, into a musical family. His father (who was also an oboe and English horn player) taught him clarinet, his mother piano, and he attended the Manhattan School of Music. In 1971 he auditioned with the New York Philharmonic playing English horn and was a finalist.

McCandless has released a series of records of his own compositions with bands he led, including All the Mornings Bring (Elektra/Asylum, 1979), Navigator (Landslide, 1981), Heresay (Windham Hill, 1988), Premonition (Windham Hill, 1992). With Oregon, he has recorded over twenty albums, as well as several albums with Paul Winter.

In 1996, McCandless won a Grammy Award for Best Pop Instrumental with Béla Fleck and the Flecktones. He also won Grammys in 2007 and 2011 with the Paul Winter Consort for Best New Age Album and in 1993 for Al Jarreau's album Heaven and Earth. His performance on Oregon's album 1000 Kilometers was nominated for a Grammy for Best Jazz Instrumental Solo in 2009. He won the Down Beat Critics' Poll for Best Established Combo, the Deutscher Schallplatten Preis for his album Ectopia, and the Arbeitskreis Jazz im Bundesverband der Phonographishen Wirtschaft Gold Record Award.

In 1985, McCandless toured Europe with bassist Barre Phillips and German clarinetist Theo Jörgensmann. He has been a guest musician with Béla Fleck and the Flecktones, appearing on the 1999 album Greatest Hits of the 20th Century and the 2002 album Live at the Quick, and has toured with tabla musician Sandip Burman. He was a guest of Leftover Salmon and The String Cheese Incident in the late 1990s. He has appeared on stage in duets with pianist Art Lande, with whom he recorded the album Skylight. Since 2013 he has been playing regularly in Europe with the Samo Šalamon Bassless Trio.

McCandless is active in classical music. As an orchestral soloist, he has performed with the Camerata Chamber Orchestra of Mexico City, the Saint Paul Chamber Orchestra, Philadelphia Orchestra, Buffalo Philharmonic Orchestra, Los Angeles Philharmonic, and the Stuttgart Radio Symphony Orchestra. Three of Paul's orchestral scores are heard on the album Oregon in Moscow. "Round Robin", the opening track, received 2001 Grammy nominations for Best Instrumental Composition and Best Instrumental Arrangement.

In 2014, McCandless began performing with Charged Particles, a jazz trio based in San Francisco, including opening the 2015 San Luis Obispo Jazz Festival with them and headlining at the Stanford Jazz Festival. The quartet has appeared at Birdland (in New York City), Blues Alley (in Washington, D.C.), Yoshi's Jazz Club, The Musical Instrument Museum in Phoenix, The Dakota Jazz Club, and other venues throughout the U.S. In 2017, McCandless and Charged Particles did a ten-day tour of Indonesia, performing at the Motion Blue Jazz Club (Jakarta), Jazz Centrum (Surabaya), and the Jazz Gunung Bromo Festival (on Mount Bromo)

== Reception ==
The London Telegraph called McCandless's contribution to The Great Jubilee Concert "remarkable". Said Jazz Journal, "Paul McCandless delivered terrific, beautifully modulated solos on both oboe and soprano."

The Washington Post called McCandless a "stellar player" who plays "sparkling harmonic cascades."

== Awards and honors ==
- Grammy Award, Best R&B Vocal Performance, Male, with Al Jarreau, 1993
- Grammy Award, Best Pop Instrumental Performance with Béla Fleck and the Flecktones, 1996
- Grammy Award, Best New Age Album, with Paul Winter Consort, 2007, 2011
- Grammy Award Nomination, Best Instrumental Composition, Best Instrumental Arrangement, Oregon in Moscow, 2001
- Grammy Award Nomination, Best Jazz Instrumental Solo, 1000 Kilometers, 2009
- Winner, Talent Deserving of Wider Recognition, Down Beat Magazine Critics' Poll, 1976, 1978

== Discography ==
=== As leader ===
- All the Mornings Bring (Elektra, 1979)
- Navigator (Landslide, 1981)
- Skylight with Art Lande, Dave Samuels (ECM, 1981)
- Heresay (Windham Hill, 1988)
- Premonition (Windham Hill, 1992)
- Squanto and the First Thanksgiving (Rabbit Ears, 1993)
- Sentimental Sax (Nature Quest, 1995)
- The Natural Saxophone (NorthSound, 1995)
- Torches on the Lake with Spencer Brewer (Access, 1996)
- Twilight (Impressions, 1996)
- Summer Nights with Spencer Brewer (Impressions, 1996)
- The Hidden Jewel with Art Lande (Mystica, 2002)
- Perfect Alignment with Steven Halpern (Inner Peace Music, 2002)
- Shapeshifter with Art Lande (Synergy Music 2004)

With Oregon

- Music of Another Present Era (Vanguard, 1972)
- Distant Hills (Vanguard, 1973)
- Winter Light (Vanguard, 1974)
- In Concert (Vanguard, 1975)
- Together (Vanguard, 1976)
- Friends (Vanguard, 1977)
- Violin (Vanguard, 1978)
- Out of the Woods (Elektra, 1978)
- Moon and Mind (Vanguard, 1979)
- Roots in the Sky (Elektra, 1979)
- In Performance (Elektra, 1980)
- Our First Record (Vanguard, 1980)
- Oregon (ECM, 1983)
- Crossing (ECM, 1985)
- Ecotopia (ECM, 1987)
- 45th Parallel (Portrait, 1989)
- Always, Never, and Forever (veraBra, 1991)
- Troika (veraBra, 1994)
- Beyond Words (Chesky, 1995)
- Northwest Passage (Intuition, 1997)
- Music for a Midsummer Night's Dream (Oregon Music, 1998)
- Oregon in Moscow (Intuition, 2000)
- Live at Yoshi's (Intuition, 2002)
- Prime (CAM Jazz, 2005)
- 1000 Kilometers (CAM Jazz, 2007)
- In Stride (CAM Jazz, 2010)
- Family Tree (CAM Jazz, 2012)
- Live in New Orleans (Hi Hat, 2016)
- Lantern (CAM Jazz, 2017)

=== As guest ===
With Pierluigi Balducci

- Blue from Heaven (Dodicilune, 2013)
- Evansiana (Dodicilune, 2017)

With Suzanne Ciani

- Live (Seventh Wave, 1997)
- Turning (Wave, 1999)
- Meditations for Dreams, Relaxation and Sleep (Seventh Wave, 2002)
- Pure Romance (Seventh Wave, 2003)
- Silver Ship (Seventh Wave, 2005)

With Alex De Grassi

- Beyond the Night Sky (Tropo, 1996)
- As You Drift Away: Lullabies on Guitar (Music for Little People, 2008)

With Béla Fleck

- Tales from the Acoustic Planet (Warner Bros., 1995)
- Live Art (Warner Bros., 1996)
- Greatest Hits of the 20th Century (Warner Bros., 1999)
- Outbound (Columbia, 2000)
- Live at the Quick (Columbia, 2002)

With David Friesen

- Star Dance, (Inner City, 1976)
- Waterfall Rainbow (Inner City, 1977)
- Storyteller (Muse, 1981)

With Tony Furtado

- Tony Furtado Band (Cojema, 2000)
- American Gypsy (True North, 2002)
- Live Gypsy (Dualtone, 2003)

With Steven Halpern

- Inner Peace (Inner Peace, 1994)
- Perfect Alignment (Halpern Sounds, 2002)
- Lake Suite (Inner Peace Music, 2006)
- Music for Lovers, Vol. 2 (Inner Peace Music, 2007)
- Drive Time Rx (Inner Peace, 2009)
- Deep Alpha (Inner Peace, 2012)
- Clutter Clearing at the Speed of Sound (Steven Halpern, 2016)

With Mark Isham

- Castalia (Virgin, 1988)
- Songs My Children Taught Me (Windham Hill, 1991)
- Thumbelina (Festival, 1989)
- Lake Suite (Windham Hill, 2006)

With Peter Kater

- Honorable Sky (Silver Wave, 1994)
- Birds of Prey (Platinum Entertainment, 1999)
- Heart's Desire (Source UK, 2001)
- Inner Works: Piano & Strings (Source UK, 2002)
- Xmas Ecstacy (Silver Wave, 2003)
- Red Moon (Silver World, 2003)
- Elements Series: Air (Real Music, 2005)
- Elements Series: Fire (Real Music, 2005)
- Elements Series: Water (Real Music, 2005)
- Faces of the Sun(Silverwave, 2007)
- Call of Love (Point of Light, 2010)
- Light Body (Mysterium, 2012)
- Heart of the Universe(Spirit Voyage, 2013)
- Ritual (Mysterium, 2013)

With Nguyen Le

- Zanzibar (EmArcy, 1992)
- Walking on the Tiger's Tail (ACT, 2005)

With Michael Manring

- Toward the Center of the Night (Windham Hill, 1989)
- Drastic Measures (Windham Hill, 1991)
- The Book of Flame (Alchemy, 1998)

With Jaco Pastorius

- Twins I Aurex Jazz Festival '82 (Warner Bros., 1982)
- Twins II Aurex Jazz Festival '82 (Warner Bros., 1982)
- Invitation (Warner Bros., 1983)

With Fred Simon

- Usually/Always (Windham Hill, 1988)
- Remember the River (Naim, 2004)
- Since Forever (Naim, 2009)

With Paul Winter

- Something in the Wind (A&M, 1969)
- Icarus (Epic, 1972)
- Road (A&M, 1970)
- Common Ground (A&M, 1978)
- Canyon (Living Music, 1985)
- Wolf Eyes (Living Music, 1988)
- Earth: Voices of a Planet (Living Music, 1990)
- Spanish Angel (Living Music, 1993)

With others

- Will Ackerman, The Opening of Doors (Windham Hill, 1992)
- Will Ackerman, Sound of Wind Driven Rain (Windham Hill, 1998)
- Darol Anger, Heritage (Six Degrees, 1997)
- Pierluigi Balducci, Blue from Heaven (Dodicilune, 2012)
- Yelena Eckemoff, Arild Andersen, Peter Erskine, Desert (L&H 2018)
- Carla Bley, Night-Glo (ECM, 1985)
- Fabularasa, En plein air (Radar Music/Egea, 2007)
- Fabularasa, D'amore e di marea (Radar Music/Egea, 2012)
- Cyrus Faryar, Cyrus (Collectors' Choice, 2006)
- Meridian Green, In the Heart of This Town (String Bender, 1998)
- Paul Hanson, Voodoo Suite (Manzanita Ranch, 2000)
- Lars Jansson, Giving Receiving (Imogena, 2000)
- Al Jarreau, Heaven and Earth (Reprise, 1992)
- Kevin Kern, Beyond the Sundial (Real Music, 1997)
- Michael Land, The Dig (Angel, 1996)
- Art Lande, The Three Billy Goats Gruff and the Three Little Pigs
- The Late Bronze Age, Outside Looking Out (Landslide, 1980)
- Wynton Marsalis, Hot House Flowers (CBS, 1984)
- Stephanie Mills, Christmas (MCA, 1991)
- Mariah Parker, Sangria (Ancient-Future Records, 2009)
- Mariah Parker, Indo Latin Jazz Live in Concert (Ancient-Future Records, 2017)
- Mariah Parker, Windows Through Time (Ancient-Future Records, 2024)
- Marco Pereira, Essence (Kind of Blue, 2007)
- Todd Phillips, Timeframe (Compass, 1995)
- The Pursuit of Happiness, The Downward Road (Mercury, 1993)
- Vasant Rai, Autumn Song (Vanguard, 1978)
- Vasant Rai, Spring Flowers (Vanguard, 1976)
- Samo Salamon, Little River (Samo Records, 2015)
- String Cheese Incident, 'Round the Wheel (SCI Fidelity, 1998)
- Andy Summers, The Golden Wire (Private Music, 1989)
- Taliesin Orchestra, Sacred (Compendia, 2002)
- Huong Thanh, Mangustao (ACT, 2004)
- Ralph Towner, Trios / Solos (ECM, 1973)
- Ralph Towner, City of Eyes (ECM, 1989)
- Kit Walker, Fire in the Lake (Windham Hill, 1989)
- Eberhard Weber, Later That Evening (ECM, 1982)
- Eberhard Weber, Endless Days (ECM, 2001)
- Victor Wooten, What Did He Say? (Vanguard, 1997)
- Sacbé, The Painters (PolyGram, 1996)
- Motoshi Kosako, Place in the Heart (2010)
