= The Navigator (Paul McCandless album) =

Navigator

Studio album by Paul McCandless
- Released: 1982
- Recorded: February 1981
- Studio: Right Track Recording, New York City
- Genre: Jazz
- Length: 44:39
- Label: Landslide
- Producer: Michael Rothschild

Paul McCandless chronology
All the Mornings Bring (1978)	Navigator (1982)	Heresay (1988)

Navigator is an album by American jazz instrumentalist Paul McCandless recorded in 1981 for the Landslide label. It was re-released in 1994.

== Track listing ==
1. "Julian" – 6:57
2. "Now and Then" – 5:38
3. "Helix" – 4:26
4. "Non-Navigator" – 2:17
5. "The Great Lawn" – 5:31
6. "Willow" – 8:26
7. "Circle Waltz" – 5:16
8. "Synapse – The Well" – 3:01
9. "Downstream" – 7:30

- Recorded at Right Track Recording (now MSR) in New York City in February 1981

== Personnel ==
- Paul McCandless – Soprano Saxophone, Oboe, English Horn, Bass Clarinet
- Steve Rodby – Acoustic Bass
- David Samuels – Vibraphone, Marimba, Percussion, Voice
- Ross Traut – Electric Guitar, Sitar
- Jay Clayton – vocals
- Linda Namias – Handclaps
