= Prophet-5 =

Synthesizer

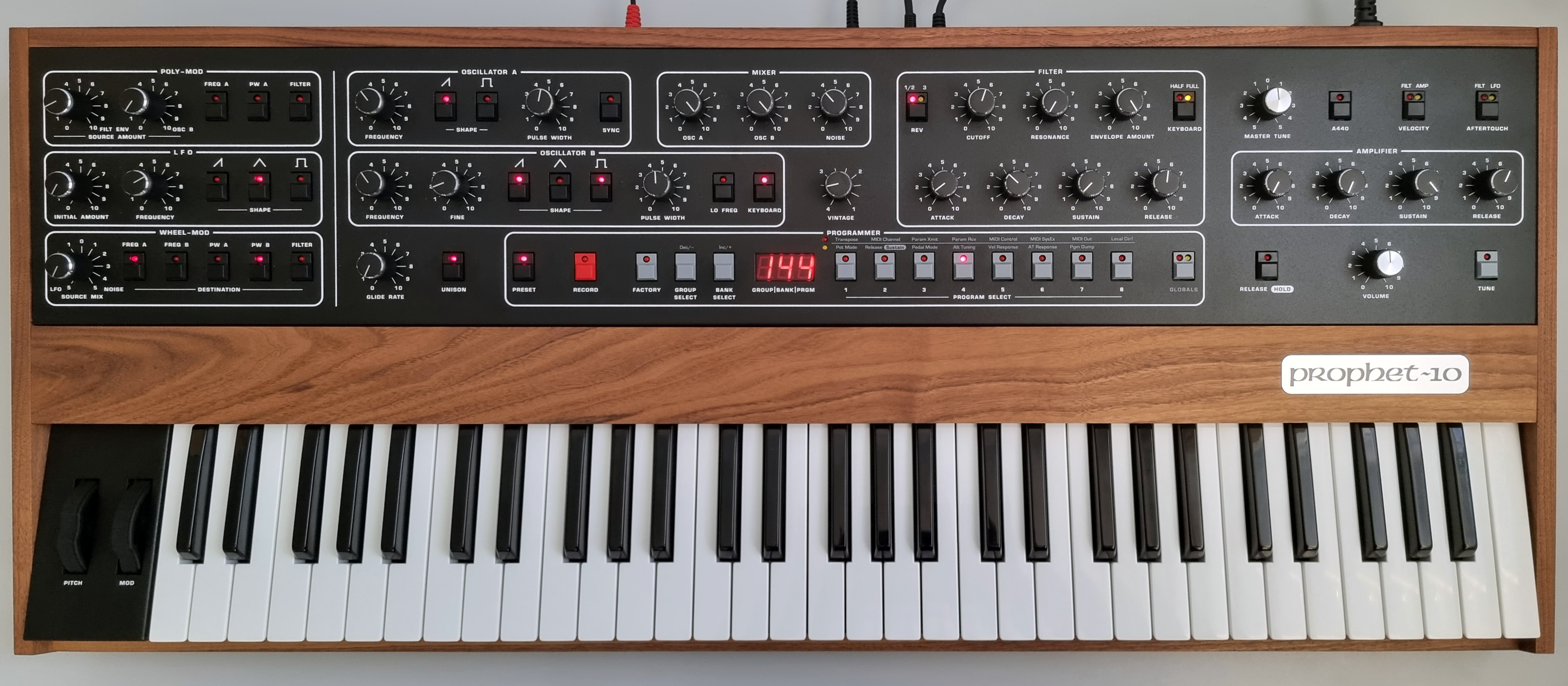
- A Prophet-10 Rev 4, a 2020 reissue
- Manufacturer: Sequential
- Dates: 1978–84, 2020– (Prophet-5); 1977, 1981–84, 2020– (Prophet-10)
- Price: US$3,995 (Rev 1, 2); US$4,595 (Rev 3.x); US$3,499 (Rev 4, 5-voice, 2020); US$4,299 (Rev 4, 10-voice, 2020)

Technical specifications
- Polyphony: 5 voices (Prophet-5); 10 voices (Prophet-10)
- Timbrality: Monotimbral (Prophet-5); Multitimbral (Prophet-10)
- Oscillator: 2 VCOs per voice
- LFO: 1
- Synthesis type: Analog subtractive Analog FM (Poly-Mod)
- Filter: 4-pole resonant low-pass
- Aftertouch expression: Rev1 to Rev3 no, Rev4 yes
- Velocity expression: Rev1 to Rev3 no, Rev4 yes
- Storage memory: 40 patches (Rev 3 120, Rev 4 200)
- Effects: None

Input/output
- Keyboard: 61 keys (Prophet-5 (all versions), Prophet-10 (1977, withdrawn from production) (Prophet-10 (1981-84)) Dual manual 61 key
- Left-hand control: Pitch and modulation wheels
- External control: CV/Gate; Proprietary serial interface MIDI (Rev 3.3)

The Prophet-5 is an analog synthesizer manufactured by the American company Sequential. It was designed by Dave Smith and John Bowen in 1977. It was the first polyphonic synthesizer with fully programmable memory.

Before the Prophet-5, synthesizers required users to adjust controls to change sounds, with no guarantee of exactly recreating a sound. Sequential used microprocessors to allow users to recall sounds instantly rather than having to recreate them manually. The Prophet-5 facilitated a move from synthesizers creating unpredictable sounds to producing "a standard package of familiar sounds".

The Prophet-5 became a market leader and was widely used in popular music and film soundtracks. In 1981, Sequential released a 10-voice, double-keyboard version, the Prophet-10. Sequential introduced new versions in 2020, and it has been emulated in software synthesizers and hardware. Sequential also released several further Prophet synthesizers, such as the Prophet '08.

== Development ==
"Twice Around the Sun"
From the 1987 jazz album Ecotopia by the band Oregon, this song starts with the Prophet-10 played solo by Ralph Towner. He is joined at ten seconds by Paul McCandless on soprano saxophone, with synth and horn each repeating the theme. Bass and percussion come in at 20 seconds.

The Prophet-5 was created in 1977 by the American engineers Dave Smith and John Bowen at Sequential Circuits. At the time, Smith had a full-time job working with microprocessors, a new technology. Smith conceived the idea of combining them with synthesizer chips to create a programmable synthesizer; this would allow users to save sounds to memory, rather than having to recreate them manually. He did not pursue the idea, assuming Moog or ARP would design the instrument first. When no instrument emerged, in early 1977, Smith quit his job to work full-time on the idea.

Initially, Smith and Bowen developed the Prophet-10, a synthesizer with ten voices of polyphony, meaning it could play up to ten notes simulatenously. However, it was unstable and quickly overheated, creating tuning problems. Smith and Bowen removed half the electronics, reducing the voices to five and creating the Prophet-5. Smith demonstrated the Prophet-5 at the NAMM Convention in January 1978 and shipped the first models later that year.

== Production ==
Three versions were built between 1978 and 1984. The first, Revision 1, was hand-assembled and produced quickly to generate initial revenue; only 182 were made. Revision 2 was more robust, added cassette patch storage, and replaced the koa wood casing with walnut. Revision 3 replaced the Solid State Music (SSM) chipset with Curtis (CEM) chips, necessitating a major redesign. According to Sound on Sound, Revision 3 "remained impressive and pleasant to play, but was slightly cold and featureless by comparison to earlier models". Almost 6,000 Revision 3 models were produced.

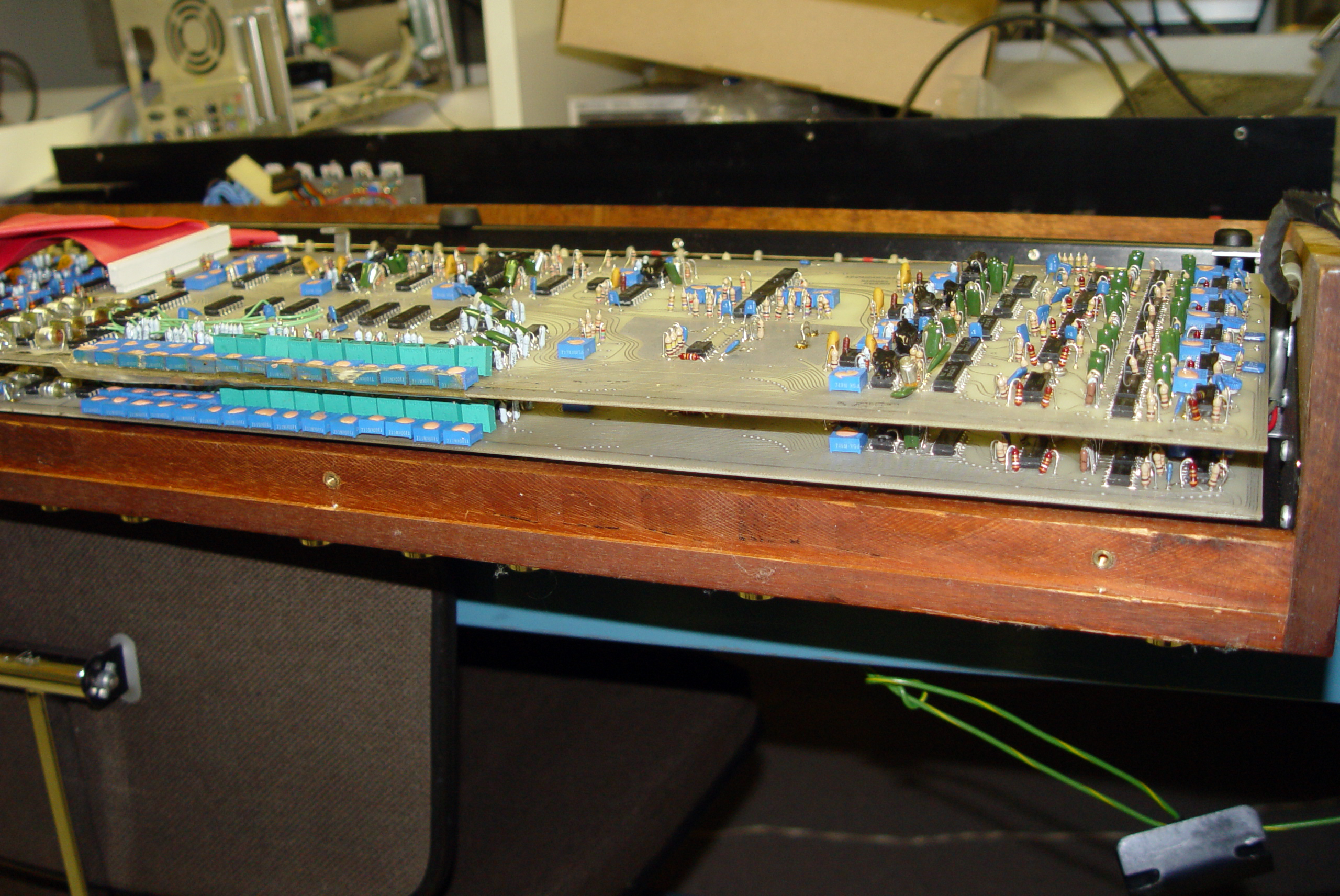
In the Prophet-10, a pair of Prophet-5 sound boards provide ten voices

In 1981, Sequential Circuits released the Prophet-10, featuring 10 voices, 20 oscillators, and a double keyboard. Like the Prophet-5 Revision 3, it uses CEM chips. The first Prophet-10s used an Exatron Stringy Floppy drive for saving patches and storing sequencer data. Sequential later moved to a Braemar tape drive, which was more reliable and could store about four times as many sequencer events.

In 2020, Sequential released the Prophet-5 Rev4, with additional memory and features. They also released a new version of the Prophet-10, with the same external design as the Prophet-5.

== Features ==
Unlike its nearest competitor in the 1970s, the Yamaha CS-80, the Prophet-5 has patch memory, allowing users to store sounds rather than having to reprogram them manually. It has a proprietary serial interface that allows the user to play using the Prophet Remote, a sling-style keytar controller, but the interface cannot connect the Prophet-5 to other devices. Sequential produced a MIDI interface that could be retrofitted to later Prophet-5 models. Third-party MIDI interfaces have also been offered.

== Impact ==
Before the Prophet-5, synthesizers required users to adjust cables and knobs to change sounds, with no guarantee of exactly recreating a sound. The Prophet-5, with its ability to save sounds to patch memory, facilitated a move from synthesizers creating unpredictable sounds to producing "a standard package of familiar sounds". The Prophet-5 became a market leader and industry standard. According to MusicRadar, the Prophet-5 "changed the world – simple as that".

The Cars keyboardist Greg Hawkes used the Prophet-5 for the hits "Let's Go" (1979) and "Shake It Up" (1981). Kraftwerk used it on their 1981 "Computer World" Tour, and Phil Collins used it on his 1981 single "In the Air Tonight". Japan used it frequently, such as on their 1982 hit single "Ghosts". Michael Jackson used it extensively on Thriller (1982), and Madonna used it on Like a Virgin (1984). Peter Gabriel considered the Prophet-5 his "old warhorse", using it for many sounds on his 1986 album So. Radiohead used it on their 2000 album Kid A on songs including "Everything In Its Right Place".

Brad Fiedel used a Prophet-10 to record the soundtrack for The Terminator (1984), and the filmmaker John Carpenter used both the Prophet-5 and Prophet-10 extensively for his soundtracks. The Greek composer Vangelis used the Prophet-5 and the Prophet-10, such as in the soundtrack of Blade Runner (1982). The Japanese composer Ryuichi Sakamoto used the Prophet-5 extensively, including on his soundtrack Merry Christmas Mr. Lawrence and in his work with Yellow Magic Orchestra.

Other users include OMD, Tears for Fears, Thompson Twins, Thomas Dolby, Devo, Eurythmics, Soft Cell, Vince Clarke, Pet Shop Boys, Giorgio Moroder, Tony Banks, Tangerine Dream, Jean-Michel Jarre, Dr. Dre, Richard Wright of Pink Floyd, Rick Wakeman, Pendulum, BT and John Harrison.

== Successors and emulations ==
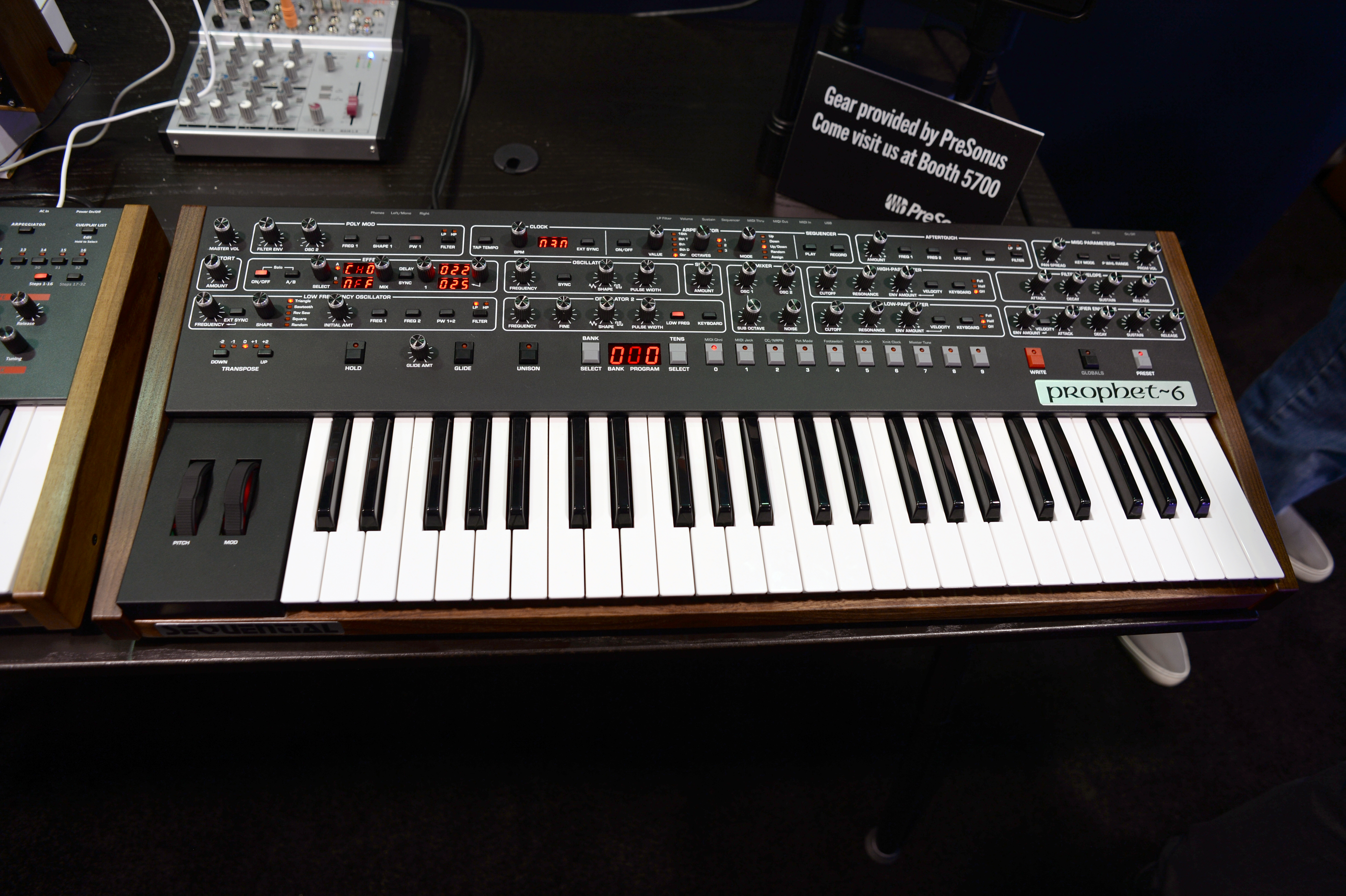
Sequential Prophet-6 (2015)

Smith's companies released several synthesizers with the Prophet name, including the Pro-One, the Prophet VS, the Prophet '08 and the Prophet-6. They also released samplers, such as the Prophet 2000 and the Prophet 3000. In 2020, Sequential announced a new version of the Prophet-5, the Rev 4. It adds features including USB and MIDI connectivity, velocity and aftertouch sensitivity, polyphonic glide, and two sets of filters. Sequential also announced a new Prophet-10 Rev 4, a ten-voice version of the Prophet-5 Rev 4.

Bowen provided consultation for Native Instruments during the development of the Pro 5 software synthesizer emulation, released in 1999. It was followed by the Pro 52 in 2000 and the Pro 53 in 2003. Bowen also provided consultation for Creamware for their 2003 software emulations, the Prophet and Prophet Plus. Arturia, U-he and Softube released emulations in 2006, 2018 and 2023. Other hardware clones include the Behringer Pro-16 (prototype revealed at NAMM 2025), and PikoPiko Factory's open-source Profree-4, released in 2022.
