= Vasant Rai =

- Born: 1942
- Origin: India
- Died: 1985 (aged 43) New York City, United States
- Genres: Indian classical music
- Instrument: Sarod

Vasant Rai (1942–1985) was an Indian musician who played the Indo-Afghan instrument the sarod.

== Personal life and education ==
Rai's family was born in Unjha, Gujarat. Rai was the last student of Baba Allauddin Khan, who is best known as the teacher of Ravi Shankar.

He died in his New York apartment shortly after a Carnegie Hall performance.

== Career ==
Rai had been visiting the United States since his teen years. He settled in New York City in 1969 and lived mainly in the Greenwich Village area and also for a short time at the Chelsea Hotel when he was not touring. From 1969 to 1985, he conducted the Alam School of Music in Greenwich Village. Alla Rakha, Mahapurush Mishra, Shamta Prasad and Zakir Hussain usually accompanied him on the tabla. Vasant Rai taught Indian musicians, most notable are sarodist Pradeep Barot, mandolin player Emu Desai, and sitar player Shamim Ahmed Khan. Vasant Rai's notable western musicians were Lex Hixon, Collin Walcott, and Don Cherry.

Rai had been signed exclusively by Vanguard Records from 1975 to 1982. Vasant's first commercial recording was by EMI and on the tabla was Alla Rakha.

Vasant Rai's sarod was a gift from his guru Allauddin Khan, and was made by Allauddin Khan's younger brother Ayet Ali Khan in the 1930s.
