= Dawn Dance =

Studio album by Steve Eliovson and Collin Walcott
- Released: 1981
- Recorded: January 1981
- Studios: Tonstudio Bauer; Ludwigsburg, West Germany
- Genres: World music, Jazz
- Length: 43:10
- Label: ECM 1198
- Producer: Manfred Eicher

Collin Walcott chronology
Grazing Dreams (1977)	Dawn Dance (1981)

Dawn Dance is an album by South African guitarist Steve Eliovson and American percussionist Collin Walcott, recorded in January 1981 and released on ECM later that year.

== Background ==
Eliovson was born in 1954 in Johannesburg, South Africa, and began studying the guitar at age 21 with Johnny Fourie. Dawn Dance came about when he sent a cassette tape of his playing to ECM and was offered a recording contract. His second recording for ECM was postponed following an accident, and he disappeared from the music scene, dying of cancer on March 15, 2020. Dawn Dance marked his only appearance on an album.

== Reception ==
Professional ratings
Review scores
Source	Rating
AllMusic	4/5 stars
The Penguin Guide to Jazz	3/4 stars
The Virgin Encyclopedia of Jazz	4/5 stars

The authors of The Penguin Guide to Jazz Recordings stated: "Walcott's duo record with guitarist Eliovson is undeservedly little known and is well worth investigating, opening up just another corner of this extraordinary talent, an almost folksy sound, cool and fresh."

Writing for Between Sound and Space, Tyran Grillo remarked: "Sparse anecdotal evidence paints of Eliovson the portrait of a regretful artist, a man who was compelled to sell his worldly possessions... and return to his native South Africa. Yet we can also take pleasure in knowing that he left this one document, a jewel of quiet magnificence."

A writer for Billboard included the album in the "recommended LPs" column, and commented: "Eicher has long shown a special affinity for maverick guitar stylists, and this first effort from Eicher's first new guitar find in several years dovetails neatly with earlier acoustic exercises by such familiar roster contributors as Ralph Towner and John Abercrombie. Eliovson's cyclical musings are spiced by former Oregon member Walcott's atmospheric percussion."

John Schaefer included the album in his book New Sounds: A Listener's Guide to New Music, calling it "simple, tasteful stuff."

A reviewer for Frets magazine called Dawn Dance "a brilliant recording," and described the music as "New Age progressive fusion."

The Washington Post's Richard Harrington included the album in his column "1982: The Year in Jazz," calling it "noteworthy."

== Track listing ==
1. "Venice" (Eliovson) – 6:36
2. "Earth End" (Eliovson) – 4:26
3. "Awakening" (Walcott) – 1:24
4. "Song for the Masters" (Eliovson) – 3:50
5. "Wanderer" (Walcott/Eliovson) – 3:05
6. "Dawn Dance" (Eliovson) – 8:02
7. "Slow Jazz" (Eliovson) – 4:40
8. "Africa" (Eliovson) – 5:40
9. "Memories" (Eliovson) – 2:11
10. "Eternity" (Walcott/Eliovson) – 1:54

== Personnel ==
- Steve Eliovson – acoustic guitar
- Collin Walcott – percussion
