= Oregon (band) =

American jazz and world music group

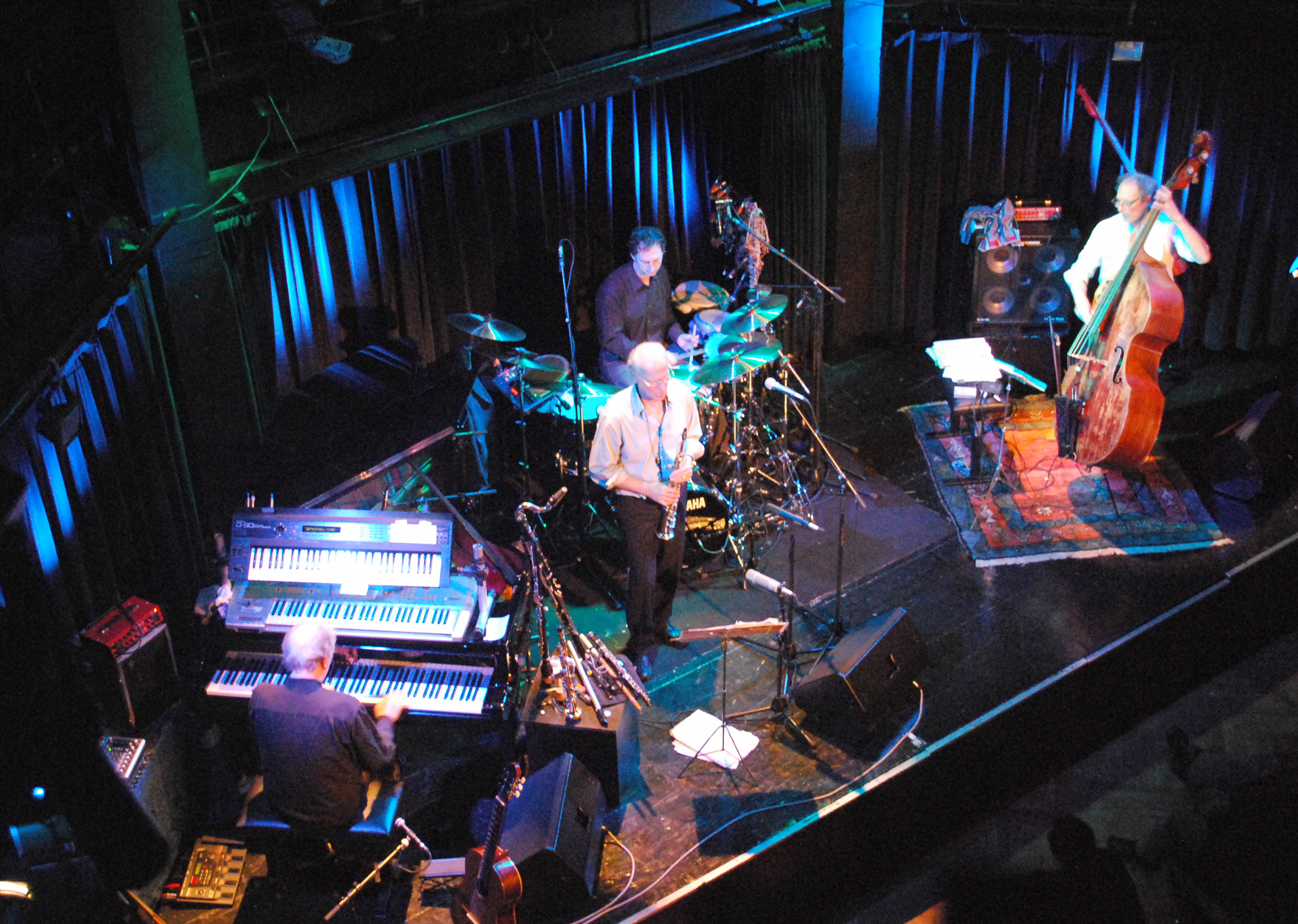
- Oregon Innsbruck 2010

Background information
- Origin: Eugene, Oregon, U.S.
- Genres: Jazz, new-age, world fusion, chamber jazz
- Years active: 1970–2019
- Labels: Vanguard, ECM, Elektra, Portrait, Intuition, VeraBra, Chesky, CAM Jazz
- Past members: Ralph Towner; Paul McCandless; Paolino Dalla Porta; Mark Walker; Collin Walcott; Trilok Gurtu; Glen Moore
- Website: www.oregonband.com

Oregon was an American jazz and world music group, formed in 1970 by Ralph Towner, Paul McCandless, Glen Moore, and Collin Walcott.

== History ==
Towner and Moore had been friends and occasional collaborators since meeting in 1960 as students at the University of Oregon. By 1969, both were working musicians living in New York; while collaborating with folksinger Tim Hardin they were introduced to world music pioneer Paul Winter's "Consort" ensemble, particularly member Collin Walcott, with whom Towner began improvising as an informal duo. By 1970 Towner and Moore had joined the Winter Consort and met fellow member McCandless; the four began exploring improvisation on their own, while their contributions continued to be seminal in redefining the Winter Consort "sound" in compositions like Towner's "Icarus".

The four musicians made their first group recording in 1970, but the label, Increase Records, went out of business before it could be released (it eventually was issued by Vanguard in 1980 as Our First Record). Oregon made its "formal" debut in New York City in 1971 (originally named "Thyme—Music of Another Present Era", the name change to Oregon was suggested by McCandless).

The group's first release Music of Another Present Era was issued on Vanguard in 1972 (the four also recorded for ECM, though the recording, 1973's Trios Solos, was billed as "Ralph Towner with Glen Moore"). With those initial recordings and the follow-ups Distant Hills (1973) and Winter Light (1974) (all on Vanguard), Oregon established itself as one of the leading improvisational groups of its day, blending Indian and Western classical music with jazz, folk, space music and avant-garde elements. The group released numerous albums on Vanguard throughout the 1970s, also making three records for Elektra/Asylum between 1978 and 1980 (including the highly acclaimed Out of the Woods and a live recording taken from performances at Carnegie Hall and in Canada in late 1979).

After a couple years' hiatus devoted to individual projects (including the birth of Walcott's daughter in 1980), the group reassembled, recording for ECM, releasing the eponymous Oregon in 1983 and Crossing in 1984. Before the latter's release, however, Walcott was killed in an bus accident in Magdeburg, East Germany while traveling between performance venues. Oregon temporarily disbanded, but regrouped in May 1985 at a memorial concert for Walcott in New York City, with Indian percussionist Trilok Gurtu sitting in (Walcott's own choice for his replacement should it become necessary). In 1986, Gurtu was invited to join Oregon; the band resumed touring and released three albums, Ecotopia (1987), 45th Parallel (1989) and Always, Never and Forever (1991), during his five years as a member.

After Trilok Gurtu's departure, the group continued as a trio, issuing two albums, Troika (1993) and Beyond Words (1995), during that period. The 1997 album Northwest Passage marked a return to the inclusion of percussion, featuring either drummer Mark Walker or Turkish Armenian percussionist Arto Tunçboyacıyan on most tracks; subsequently, Walker was taken on as a full member. In 1999, the ensemble traveled to Moscow, Russia, to record with the Tchaikovsky Symphony Orchestra of Moscow Radio, premiering orchestral compositions that had been in development for years, some dating back to their first days with the Winter Consort; that project's 2000 release, Oregon in Moscow, garnered four Grammy Award nominations. 2002 saw the release of Live at Yoshi's, recorded in San Francisco, the first live Oregon recording in two decades.

In March 2015, it was announced that Glen Moore was departing from the group, with bassist Paolino Dalla Porta succeeding him.

As of 2019, Oregon has no further plans to exist as a touring ensemble.

Ralph Towner passed away on January 18, 2026 in Rome, Italy at the age of 85.

== Discography ==
on Vanguard

- 1970 - Our First Record (first released 1980)
- 1972 - Music of Another Present Era
- 1973 - Distant Hills
- 1974 - Winter Light
- 1975 - In Concert
- 1976 - Together - with drummer Elvin Jones
- 1977 - Friends
- 1978 - Violin - with violinist Zbigniew Seifert
- 1979 - Moon and Mind
- 1981 - The Essential Oregon

on Elektra

- 1978 - Out of the Woods
- 1979 - Roots in the Sky
- 1980 - In Performance

on ECM

- 1973 - Trios / Solos - Credited to "Ralph Towner with Glen Moore"
- 1983 - Oregon
- 1984 - Crossing
- 1987 - Ecotopia

on CBS /Portrait

- 1989 - 45th Parallel

on Intuition

- 1991 - Always, Never and Forever
- 1993 - Troika

on Chesky

- 1995 - Beyond Words

on Intuition

- 1997 - Northwest Passage
- 1998 - Music for a Midsummer Night's Dream (The Oregon Trio)
- 2000 - In Moscow - with the Moscow Tchaikovsky Symphony Orchestra
- 2002 - Live at Yoshi's

on CAM Jazz

- 2005 - Prime
- 2005 - The Glide (1 track, new version on iTunes)
- 2007 - 1000 Kilometers
- 2010 - In Stride
- 2012 - Family Tree
- 2017 - Lantern

on Moosicus Records, MIG

- 2021 - '1974' (recorded live on March 14th 1974 at the Radio Bremen Sendesaal/Studio F, in Bremen/Germany by Radio Bremen)

on Jazzhaus, SWR

- 2024 - 'Treffpunkt Jazz • Ludwigsburg 1990' (recorded live on November 27th 1990 in Ludwigsburg (Scala), Germany)
