= Mark Isham =

American musician and film composer (born 1951)

- Born: Mark Ware Isham; September 7, 1951 (age 75); New York City, U.S.
- Genres: Jazz; electronic; new age
- Occupations: Musician; composer
- Instruments: Piano; keyboards; trumpet
- Years active: 1976–present
- Labels: ECM; Windham Hill; Columbia; Virgin
- Website: isham.com

Mark Ware Isham (born September 7, 1951) is an American musician and composer. A trumpeter and keyboardist, Isham works in a variety of genres, including jazz and electronic. He is also a prolific and acclaimed composer of film scores, and has scored over 200 film and television productions since his debut in 1983.

Isham is a nine-time Grammy Award nominee, winning Best New Age Album for his 1990 self-titled album. He was nominated for an Academy Award for A River Runs Through It (1992), and a Golden Globe Award for Nell (1994). He has also been nominated for six Primetime Emmy Awards, winning Outstanding Original Main Title Theme Music for EZ Streets.

External image
- Portrait of Mark Isham.

== Early life ==
Isham was born in New York City, the son of Patricia (née Hammond), a violinist, and Howard Fuller Isham, a professor of humanities. He studied trumpet from a very young age, and made his professional debut at the age of 12. When he was a teenager, Isham and his family moved to the San Francisco bay area, where he played with the Oakland East Bay Symphony.

== Career ==
"Army Strong" (2006)
"Army Strong", composed by Isham in 2006.

Isham's discography is extensive and varied, including participation with artists including David Sylvian, Group 87, Art Lande, Pharoah Sanders, Van Morrison, David Torn, and sessions with people like Brian Wilson, Joni Mitchell, Terry Bozzio, Bill Bruford, XTC, and Siouxsie Sioux. His musical styles include crossover jazz, post-bop, ambient, progressive electronic, chamber jazz, and new age.

=== Film and television scores ===
Isham is also a film composer, having worked on numerous films and television series, including The Hitcher, Reversal of Fortune, Point Break, A Midnight Clear, A River Runs Through It, Of Mice and Men, Warrior, Nell, Blade, Crash, The Black Dahlia, The Lucky One, October Sky, and Once Upon a Time.

Isham acted as well in Made in Heaven by Alan Rudolph (1987) and directed The Cowboy and the Ballerina in 1998.

== Personal life ==
Isham is married to Donna Isham. He is a Scientologist.

== Discography ==
=== Studio albums and compilations ===
- 1983 Vapor Drawings
- 1985 Film Music
- 1987 We Begin (with Art Lande)
- 1988 Castalia
- 1989 Tibet – a soundtrack
- 1990 Mark Isham
- 1991 Songs My Children Taught Me (music only, from the first four Rabbit Ears titles, see below)
- 1995 Blue Sun
- 1998 Mark Isham: A Windham Hill Retrospective
- 1999 Miles Remembered: The Silent Way Project
- 2009 Bittersweet with Kate Ceberano
- 2015 The Longest Ride (Original Score Album).

=== Rabbit Ears Storybook Classics ===
- 1987 The Steadfast Tin Soldier (Narrated by Jeremy Irons)
- 1988 The Emperor and the Nightingale (Narrated by Glenn Close)
- 1989 Thumbelina (Narrated by Kelly McGillis)
- 1990 The Emperor's New Clothes (Narrated by John Gielgud)
- 1992 The Boy Who Drew Cats (Narrated by William Hurt)
- 1994 The Firebird (Narrated by Susan Sarandon)

=== Other ===
- 2000 Hymn of Asia: L. Ron Hubbard (Instrument Orchestration and Choral Arrangements)
- 2006 Theme to the United States Army's Army Strong campaign
- 2007 Human the Death Dance by Sage Francis (Production on "Good Fashion" and "Water Line")
- 2009 Dallas et Kate with Kate Ceberano

=== As member ===
With Group 87

- Group 87 (Columbia Records, 1980)
- A Career in Dada Processing (Capitol Records, 1984)

=== As sideman ===
With Art Lande

- Rubisa Patrol (ECM, 1976)
- Desert Marauders (ECM 1978)

With Pharoah Sanders

- Journey to the One (Theresa, 1980)

With Van Morrison

- Into the Music (Mercury, 1979)
- Common One (Mercury, 1980)
- Beautiful Vision (Mercury, 1982)
- Inarticulate Speech of the Heart (Mercury, 1983)
- Live at the Grand Opera House Belfast (Mercury, 1984)

With David Sylvian

- Brilliant Trees (Virgin, 1984)
- Secrets of the Beehive (Virgin, 1987)

With David Torn

- Cloud About Mercury (ECM, 1987)

With Andy Summers

- Charming Snakes (Private Music, 1990)

== Contributions to soundtracks ==
=== Films ===
Year	Title	Director	Notes
1983	Never Cry Wolf	Carroll Ballard	
1984	Country	Richard Pearce	additional music (uncredited)
1984	Mrs. Soffel	Gillian Armstrong	
1985	Trouble in Mind	Alan Rudolph	
1986	The Making of Liberty	Charles Guggenheim	
1986	The Hitcher	Robert Harmon	
1987	Made in Heaven	Alan Rudolph	
1988	The Moderns	Alan Rudolph	
1988	C.A.T. Squad: Python Wolf	William Friedkin	"On the Threshold of Liberty" from Vapor Drawings
1988	The Beast	Kevin Reynolds	
1990	Everybody Wins	Karel Reisz	
1990	Love at Large	Alan Rudolph	
1990	Reversal of Fortune	Barbet Schroeder	
1991	Mortal Thoughts	Alan Rudolph	
1991	Crooked Hearts	Michael Bortman	
1991	Point Break	Kathryn Bigelow	
1991	Little Man Tate	Jodie Foster	
1991	Billy Bathgate	Robert Benton	
1992	A Midnight Clear	Keith Gordon	
1992	Sketch Artist	Phedon Papamichael	
1992	Cool World	Ralph Bakshi	
1992	A River Runs Through It	Robert Redford	Nominated for an Academy Award for Best Original Score. Nominated for an Awards Circuit Community Award for Best Music. Nominated for a Grammy Award for Best Score Soundtrack for Visual Media.
1992	The Public Eye	Howard Franklin	
1992	Of Mice and Men	Gary Sinise	
1993	Nowhere to Run	Robert Harmon	
1993	Fire in the Sky	Robert Lieberman	Nominated for a Saturn Award for Best Music.
1993	Made in America	Richard Benjamin	
1993	Short Cuts	Robert Altman	
1993	Romeo Is Bleeding	Peter Medak	
1994	The Getaway	Roger Donaldson	
1994	The Browning Version	Mike Figgis	
1994	Mrs. Parker and the Vicious Circle	Alan Rudolph	
1994	Quiz Show	Robert Redford	
1994	Timecop	Peter Hyams	
1994	Nell	Michael Apted	Nominated for a Golden Globe for Best Original Score - Motion Picture.
1994	Safe Passage	Robert Allan Ackerman	
1995	Miami Rhapsody	David Frankel	
1995	Waterworld	Kevin Reynolds	Rejected score Replaced by James Newton Howard
1995	Losing Isaiah	Stephen Gyllenhaal	
1995	The Net	Irwin Winkler	
1995	Home for the Holidays	Jodie Foster	
1996	Last Dance	Bruce Beresford	
1996	Gotti	Steve Shagan	
1996	Fly Away Home	Carroll Ballard	
1996	Night Falls on Manhattan	Sidney Lumet	
1997	Afterglow	Alan Rudolph	
1997	Kiss the Girls	Gary Fleder	
1997	The Defenders: Payback	Andy Wolk	
1997	The Education of Little Tree	Richard Friedenberg	
1998	The Defenders: Choice of Evils	Andy Wolk	
1998	The Gingerbread Man	Robert Altman	
1998	Blade	Stephen Norrington	
1998	The Defenders: Taking the First	Andy Wolk	
1998	Free Money	Yves Simoneau	
1999	At First Sight	Irwin Winkler	
1999	Varsity Blues	Brian Robbins	
1999	Breakfast of Champions	Alan Rudolph	
1999	October Sky	Joe Johnston	
1999	Body Shots	Michael Cristofer	
2000	Rules of Engagement	William Friedkin	
2000	Where the Money Is	Marek Kanievska	
2000	Trixie	Alan Rudolph	
2000	Men of Honor	George Tillman, Jr.	
2001	Save the Last Dance	Thomas Carter	
2001	Life as a House	Irwin Winkler	
2001	Hardball	Brian Robbins	
2001	Don't Say a Word	Gary Fleder	
2001	The Majestic	Frank Darabont	
2001	Impostor	Gary Fleder	
2002	Moonlight Mile	Brad Silberling	
2003	The Cooler	Wayne Kramer	
2004	Spartan	David Mamet	
2004	Miracle	Gavin O'Connor	
2004	Highwaymen	Robert Harmon	
2004	Twisted	Philip Kaufman	
2004	Crash	Paul Haggis	
2005	Racing Stripes	Frederik Du Chau	
2005	Kicking & Screaming	Jesse Dylan	
2005	In Her Shoes	Curtis Hanson	
2006	Running Scared	Wayne Kramer	
2006	Eight Below	Frank Marshall	
2006	Invincible	Ericson Core	
2006	Bobby	Emilio Estevez	
2006	The Black Dahlia	Brian De Palma	
2007	Freedom Writers	Richard LaGravenese	
2007	In the Valley of Elah	Paul Haggis	
2007	Lions for Lambs	Robert Redford	
2007	Gracie	Davis Guggenheim	
2007	Reservation Road	Terry George	
2007	No Reservations	Scott Hicks	
2007	Next	Lee Tamahori	
2007	The Mist	Frank Darabont	
2008	Pride and Glory	Gavin O'Connor	
2008	The Express: The Ernie Davis Story	Gary Fleder	
2008	The Secret Life of Bees	Gina Prince-Bythewood	
2009	Crossing Over	Wayne Kramer	
2009	Not Forgotten	Dror Soref	
2009	Bad Lieutenant: Port of Call New Orleans	Werner Herzog	
2009	Fame	Kevin Tancharoen	
2010	The Crazies	Breck Eisner	
2010	The Conspirator	Robert Redford	
2011	The Mechanic	Simon West	
2011	Dolphin Tale	Charles Martin Smith	
2011	Warrior	Gavin O'Connor	
2012	Stolen	Simon West	
2012	The Factory	Morgan O'Neill	
2012	The Lucky One	Scott Hicks	Won a BMI Award for Film Music.
2013	The Conjuring	James Wan	
2013	The Inevitable Defeat of Mister & Pete	George Tillman, Jr.	
2013	42	Brian Helgeland	
2013	Homefront	Gary Fleder	
2014	Beyond the Lights	Gina Prince-Bythewood	Nominated for a Black Reel Award for Outstanding Original Score.
2015	The Longest Ride	George Tillman, Jr.	
2016	A Family Man	Mark Williams	
2016	Mr. Church	Bruce Beresford	
2016	Mechanic: Resurrection	Dennis Gansel	
2016	The Accountant	Gavin O'Connor	
2016	Fallen	Scott Hicks	
2017	Megan Leavey	Gabriela Cowperthwaite	
2017	Dirty Dancing	Wayne Blair	
2018	Duck Duck Goose	Chris Jenkins	
2019	Bolden	Dan Pritzker	
2019	A Dog's Journey	Gail Mancuso	
2019	Togo	Ericson Core	
2020	Bill & Ted Face the Music	Dean Parisot	
2020	Honest Thief	Mark Williams	
2021	Judas and the Black Messiah	Shaka King	
2021	Needle in a Timestack	John Ridley	
2022	Blacklight	Mark Williams	
2022	The Unbearable Weight of Massive Talent	Tom Gormican	
2023	Shooting Stars	Chris Robinson	
2025	Soul on Fire	Sean McNamara	

=== Television series ===
Year	Title	Episode(s)	Notes
1994	Chicago Hope	"Pilot"	
1996	EZ Streets	2	
1997	Michael Hayes	"Prequel"	
1997	Nothing Sacred		TV series theme
1998	From the Earth to the Moon	2	
1999	Family Law	18	
2007	The Black Donnellys	18	
2008–2009	Crash	26	
2011–2018	Once Upon a Time	147	
2012	Beauty and the Beast	"Pilot"	
2013–2014	Once Upon a Time in Wonderland	7	
2015	Blood & Oil	10	
2015	American Crime	21	
2017	Black Mirror	"Arkangel"	
2017	Philip K. Dick's Electric Dreams	"Autofac," "Safe and Sound"	
2018–2019	Marvel's Cloak & Dagger	20	
2019	Godfather of Harlem	10	
2020	Little Fires Everywhere	8	
2020	Amazing Stories	"The Rift"	
2021	The Nevers		
2021	Sex/Life	8	
2022	The Cleaning Lady		
2023	Justified: City Primeval		

=== Documentaries and shorts ===
Year	Title	Director	Notes
1984	The Times of Harvey Milk	Rob Epstein	
1985	Portraits of Anorexia		
1985	Rabbit Ears: The Steadfast Tin Soldier		
1990	Tibet		
1993	Hawaii: Born in Paradise	Robert Hillmann	
1993	Hidden Hawaii	Robert Hillmann	
1998	The Blood Tide		
1999	Galapagos		
2001	From the Ground Up	Laura Nix	
2011	"Morning"	Dror Soref	
2017	Let It Fall: Los Angeles 1982–1992	John Ridley	

== Filmography ==
As director

Year	Title	Director	Notes
1998	The Cowboy and the Ballerina	Mark Isham	—N/a

As screenwriter

Year	Title	Director	Notes
1998	The Cowboy and the Ballerina	Mark Isham	—N/a

As actor

Year	Title	Director	Notes
1987	Made in Heaven	Alan Rudolph	—N/a

== See also ==
- List of ambient music artists
