= Satellite Award for Best Original Screenplay =

Annual film award

- Awarded for: Best Original Screenplay
- Country: United States
- Presented by: International Press Academy
- First award: 1996
- Currently held by: Jesse Eisenberg – A Real Pain (2024)
- Website: www.pressacademy.com

The Satellite Award for Best Original Screenplay is an annual award given by the International Press Academy.

== Winners and nominees ==
=== 1990s ===
Year	Film	Recipient(s)
1996	Lone Star (TIE)	John Sayles
1996	The People vs. Larry Flynt (TIE)	Scott Alexander and Larry Karaszewski
1996	Fargo	Joel Coen and Ethan Coen
1996	Shine	Scott Hicks and Jan Sardi
1996	Sling Blade	Billy Bob Thornton
1997	Good Will Hunting	Ben Affleck and Matt Damon
1997	Boogie Nights	Paul Thomas Anderson
1997	The Full Monty	Simon Beaufoy
1997	Mrs Brown	Jeremy Brock
1997	Titanic	James Cameron
1998	Pleasantville	Gary Ross
1998	American History X	David McKenna
1998	Central Station (Central do Brasil)	Walter Salles, João Emanuel Carneiro, and Marcos Bernstein
1998	Saving Private Ryan	Robert Rodat
1998	Shakespeare in Love	Marc Norman and Tom Stoppard
1999	The Sixth Sense	M. Night Shyamalan
1999	American Beauty	Alan Ball
1999	Being John Malkovich	Charlie Kaufman
1999	Magnolia	Paul Thomas Anderson
1999	Three Kings	David O. Russell and John Ridley
1999	A Walk on the Moon	Pamela Gray

=== 2000s ===
Year	Film	Recipient(s)
2000	You Can Count on Me	Kenneth Lonergan
2000	Almost Famous	Cameron Crowe
2000	Billy Elliot	Lee Hall
2000	Erin Brockovich	Susannah Grant
2000	State and Main	David Mamet
2001	Monster's Ball	Milo Addica and Will Rokos
2001	Memento	Christopher Nolan
2001	Moulin Rouge!	Baz Luhrmann and Craig Pearce
2001	The Others	Alejandro Amenábar
2001	Sexy Beast	Louis Mellis and David Scinto
2002	Talk to Her (Hable con ella)	Pedro Almodóvar
2002	All or Nothing	Mike Leigh
2002	Far from Heaven	Todd Haynes
2002	The Good Girl	Mike White
2002	Igby Goes Down	Burr Steers
2002	Lovely & Amazing	Nicole Holofcener
2003	Lost in Translation	Sofia Coppola
2003	21 Grams	Guillermo Arriaga
2003	The Cooler	Frank Hannah and Wayne Kramer
2003	Kill Bill: Volume 1	Quentin Tarantino and Uma Thurman
2003	The Station Agent	Tom McCarthy
2003	Thirteen	Catherine Hardwicke and Nikki Reed
2004	Ray	James L. White
2004	The Aviator	John Logan
2004	Hotel Rwanda	Keir Pearson and Terry George
2004	Kinsey	Bill Condon
2004	The Life Aquatic with Steve Zissou	Wes Anderson and Noah Baumbach
2005	Good Night, and Good Luck	George Clooney and Grant Heslov
2005	Crash	Paul Haggis and Bobby Moresco
2005	Happy Endings	Don Roos
2005	Nine Lives	Rodrigo García
2005	The Squid and the Whale	Noah Baumbach
2005	The War Within	Ayad Akhtar, Joseph Castelo, and Tom Glynn
2006	The Queen	Peter Morgan
2006	Babel	Guillermo Arriaga
2006	Changing Times (Les temps qui changent)	Pascal Bonitzer, Laurent Guyot, and André Téchiné
2006	The House of Sand (Casa de areia)	Elena Soarez
2006	Volver	Pedro Almodóvar
2006	The Wind That Shakes the Barley	Paul Laverty
2007	Juno	Diablo Cody
2007	Before the Devil Knows You're Dead	Kelly Masterson
2007	Eastern Promises	Steven Knight
2007	Lars and the Real Girl	Nancy Oliver
2007	The Lookout	Scott Frank
2007	Michael Clayton	Tony Gilroy
2008	The Visitor	Tom McCarthy
2008	Australia	Baz Luhrmann
2008	Frozen River	Courtney Hunt
2008	Milk	Dustin Lance Black
2008	Seven Pounds	Grant Nieporte
2009	(500) Days of Summer	Scott Neustadter and Michael H. Weber
2009	Bright Star	Jane Campion
2009	The Hurt Locker	Mark Boal
2009	A Serious Man	Joel Coen and Ethan Coen
2009	Up	Pete Docter and Bob Peterson

=== 2010s ===
Year	Film	Recipient(s)
2010	The King's Speech	David Seidler
2010	Biutiful	Alejandro González Iñárritu, Nicolás Giacobone, and Armando Bó
2010	The Eclipse	Conor McPherson and Billy Roche
2010	Get Low	Chris Provenzano and C. Gaby Mitchell
2010	Inception	Christopher Nolan
2010	The Kids Are All Right	Lisa Cholodenko and Stuart Blumberg
2010	Toy Story 3	Michael Arndt, John Lasseter, Andrew Stanton, and Lee Unkrich
2011	The Tree of Life	Terrence Malick
2011	The Artist	Michel Hazanavicius
2011	The Guard	John Michael McDonagh
2011	Mozart's Sister	René Féret
2011	Shame	Abi Morgan and Steve McQueen
2011	Tyrannosaur	Paddy Considine
2012	Zero Dark Thirty	Mark Boal
2012	Flight	John Gatins
2012	The Intouchables	Olivier Nakache and Éric Toledano
2012	The Master	Paul Thomas Anderson
2012	Moonrise Kingdom	Wes Anderson and Roman Coppola
2012	Pietà	Kim Ki-duk
2013	American Hustle	David O. Russell and Eric Warren Singer
2013	Blue Jasmine	Woody Allen
2013	Enough Said	Nicole Holofcener
2013	Her	Spike Jonze
2013	Inside Llewyn Davis	Joel Coen and Ethan Coen
2013	Saving Mr. Banks	Kelly Marcel and Sue Smith
2014	Nightcrawler	Dan Gilroy
2014	Birdman	Alejandro G. Iñárritu, Nicolás Giacobone, Alexander Dinelaris Jr., and Armando Bó
2014	Boyhood	Richard Linklater
2014	The Lego Movie	Phil Lord and Christopher Miller
2014	Love Is Strange	Ira Sachs and Mauricio Zacharias
2014	Selma	Paul Webb
2015	Spotlight	Tom McCarthy and Josh Singer
2015	Bridge of Spies	Matt Charman, Ethan Coen, and Joel Coen
2015	Inside Out	Josh Cooley, Pete Docter, and Meg LeFauve
2015	Love & Mercy	Michael Alan Lerner and Oren Moverman
2015	Straight Outta Compton	Andrea Berloff and Jonathan Herman
2015	Suffragette	Abi Morgan
2016	Moonlight	Barry Jenkins
2016	Captain Fantastic	Matt Ross
2016	Hell or High Water	Taylor Sheridan
2016	La La Land	Damien Chazelle
2016	The Lobster	Yorgos Lanthimos and Efthimis Filippou
2016	Manchester by the Sea	Kenneth Lonergan
2017	Three Billboards Outside Ebbing, Missouri	Martin McDonagh
2017	Dunkirk	Christopher Nolan
2017	The Florida Project	Sean Baker and Chris Bergoch
2017	Get Out	Jordan Peele
2017	Lady Bird	Greta Gerwig
2017	The Shape of Water	Guillermo del Toro and Vanessa Taylor
2018	Roma	Alfonso Cuarón
2018	Eighth Grade	Bo Burnham
2018	The Favourite	Deborah Davis and Tony McNamara
2018	First Reformed	Paul Schrader
2018	Green Book	Brian Hayes Currie, Peter Farrelly, and Nick Vallelonga
2018	A Quiet Place	Scott Beck, John Krasinski, and Bryan Woods
2019	Marriage Story	Noah Baumbach
2019	The Farewell	Lulu Wang
2019	Ford v Ferrari	Jez Butterworth, John-Henry Butterworth, and Jason Keller
2019	Once Upon a Time in Hollywood	Quentin Tarantino
2019	Pain and Glory	Pedro Almodóvar
2019	Parasite	Bong Joon-ho and Han Jin-won

=== 2020s ===
Year	Film	Recipient(s)
2020	Promising Young Woman	Emerald Fennell
2020	Mank	Jack Fincher
2020	Minari	Lee Isaac Chung
2020	Palm Springs	Andy Siara
2020	Soul	Pete Docter, Mike Jones, and Kemp Powers
2020	The Trial of the Chicago 7	Aaron Sorkin
2021	Belfast	Kenneth Branagh
2021	C'mon C'mon	Mike Mills
2021	A Hero	Asghar Farhadi
2021	King Richard	Zach Baylin
2021	Licorice Pizza	Paul Thomas Anderson
2021	Parallel Mothers	Pedro Almodóvar
2022	The Banshees of Inisherin	Martin McDonagh
2022	Close	Lukas Dhont and Angelo Tijssens
2022	Everything Everywhere All at Once	Daniel Kwan and Daniel Scheinert
2022	The Fabelmans	Tony Kushner and Steven Spielberg
2022	Tár	Todd Field
2022	Triangle of Sadness	Ruben Östlund
2023	Maestro	Bradley Cooper and Josh Singer
2023	Anatomy of a Fall	Justine Triet and Arthur Harari
2023	Barbie	Greta Gerwig and Noah Baumbach
2023	The Holdovers	David Hemingson
2023	May December	Samy Burch
2023	Past Lives	Celine Song
2024	A Real Pain	Jesse Eisenberg
2024	Anora	Sean Baker
2024	The Brutalist	Brady Corbet and Mona Fastvold
2024	Hard Truths	Mike Leigh
2024	Seed of the Sacred Fig	Mohammad Rasoulof
2024	The Substance	Coralie Fargeat
