= Running Scared (2006 film) =

2006 action thriller film by Wayne Kramer

- Theatrical release poster
- Directed by: Wayne Kramer
- Written by: Wayne Kramer
- Produced by: Michael Pierce; Brett Ratner; Sammy Lee
- Starring: Paul Walker; Cameron Bright; Vera Farmiga; Chazz Palminteri
- Cinematography: Jim Whitaker
- Edited by: Arthur Coburn
- Music by: Mark Isham
- Production companies: Media 8 Entertainment; True Gift
- Distributed by: 3L Filmverleih (Germany); New Line Cinema (United States); Media 8 Entertainment (International)
- Release dates: February 24, 2006 (United States); April 13, 2006 (Germany)
- Running time: 122 minutes
- Countries: Germany; United States
- Languages: English; German; Russian; Ukrainian
- Budget: $15 million
- Box office: $9.7 million

Running Scared is a 2006 neo-noir action thriller film written and directed by Wayne Kramer. It stars Paul Walker as a low-ranking mafioso who is ordered to get rid of a gun used to kill corrupt cops only to find himself in a race against time when the weapon falls into the wrong hands. Cameron Bright, Vera Farmiga, and Chazz Palminteri appear in supporting roles.

The film was released in the United States on February 24, 2006, by New Line Cinema. It received mixed reviews from critics and grossed $9.7 million on a $15 million budget.

== Plot ==
A large drug deal between New Jersey mobsters and a Jamaican gang goes awry, leading to a shootout that kills two corrupt police officers who were attempting to rob the gangs. Mobster Tommy Perello orders his subordinate, Joey Gazelle, to dispose of the guns; Joey goes home to his wife Teresa and their ten-and-a-half-year-old son Nicky, where he stashes the weapons in his basement. Unbeknownst to him, Nicky and his friend Oleg secretly watch him.

Oleg steals one of the guns before heading home to his mother Mila and his abusive stepfather, Anzor. After Anzor becomes belligerent, Oleg shoots him before leaving the house. When Joey goes to investigate the disturbance, he finds a wounded Anzor who then describes the gun. Joey realizes that it is one of the weapons he hid earlier, and rushes to track down Oleg before the police do.

Throughout the night, Oleg runs into people living outside mainstream society: a homeless crack addict, a drug dealer, a prostitute, Divina, and her abusive pimp Lester. After Oleg helps Divina, she decides to look after him. Divina takes him to a diner where they find Joey, who is explaining to his boss Frankie Perello that Oleg has the gun. Oleg stashes the gun in the diner bathroom, and after leaving with Divina, he is found by police officers who then return him to Anzor.

Oleg once again escapes, and is taken in by a kindly family. When Oleg becomes suspicious of them, he discreetly calls Teresa, who then arrives and threatens her way into their apartment. She rescues Oleg and tells him to leave with the other children, then murders the parents after finding evidence of snuff films and other paraphernalia. Meanwhile, Joey continues his search, and eventually finds Oleg. However, just before he can retrieve the gun, both he and Oleg are found by Tommy, who goes to take them to Frankie.

Tommy takes Joey and Oleg to an ice hockey rink to meet Frankie and Russian mob boss Ivan. Ivan has brought Anzor to try and get Oleg to tell them the source of the gun he used. After Ivan slaps the boy, Joey lashes out at him, and he, in turn, is subdued and beaten by Ivan's thugs. When Anzor refuses to kill Oleg, Ivan kills him, and then turns to kill Oleg. Before he can, Joey distracts him by accusing Frankie of planning to attack the Russians because Anzor was cooking meth in Frankie's territory. A shootout ensues between the two gangs, leading to the deaths of Tommy and Ivan. When Frankie attempts to shoot Joey, the latter reveals that he is an undercover FBI agent, showing a hidden wire under his shirt. Oleg then distracts Frankie, allowing Joey to disarm and kill him. Joey and Oleg then exit as the FBI and local police storm the building.

Joey and Oleg return to the diner for breakfast, and they encounter Lester holding the gun that Oleg had hidden earlier. In the ensuing struggle, Lester shoots Joey in the stomach, but not before Joey fatally stabs Lester with a switchblade. Joey and Oleg struggle to return to Teresa and Nicky. Meanwhile, Mila, thinking Oleg is dead, commits suicide by blowing herself up in Anzor's meth lab. Just as Teresa and Nicky rush outside to investigate, they see Joey crash his car after losing consciousness.

Days later, Teresa and Nicky attend Joey's funeral along with Oleg, who has been adopted by the family. They drive out to a small farmhouse, where Joey emerges, having faked his death to protect himself and his family after being outed.

== Cast ==
- Paul Walker as Joseph "Joey" Gazelle, a subordinate for the Perello Crime Family
- Cameron Bright as Oleg Yugorsky, a young Russian boy living with his mother and abusive stepfather
- Vera Farmiga as Teresa Gazelle, Joey's wife
- Chazz Palminteri as Detective Rydell, a dirty cop who blackmails the Perello Mafia
- Karel Roden as Anzor Yugorsky, Oleg's stepfather and a subordinate for the Russian Mafia
- Johnny Messner as Tommy "Tombs" Perello, Frankie Perello's son and heir to the Perello Mafia
- Ivana Miličević as Mila Yugorsky, Oleg's mother
- Alex Neuberger as Nicky Gazelle, Joey and Teresa's son
- Michael Cudlitz as Sal "Gummy Bear" Franzone
- Bruce Altman as Dez Hansel, a child abductor and snuff filmmaker along with his wife, Edele
- Elizabeth Mitchell as Edele Hansel, a child abductor and snuff filmmaker along with her husband, Dez
- Arthur J. Nascarella as Frankie Perello, Don of the Perello Crime Family
- John Noble as Ivan Yugorsky, head of the Russian Mafia
- Idalis DeLeon as Divina, a prostitute whom Oleg saved from Lester
- David Warshofsky as Lester, an abusive pimp
- Jim Tooey as Tony
- Thomas Rosales Jr. as Julio
- Glenn Wrage as FBI Special Agent In Charge

== Production ==
Paul Walker pursued a role in the film because the script recalled the gritty crime melodramas he loved, saying, "This is a movie I’d really like to see. I love Guy Ritchie movies. I love Snatch." Kramer did not have Walker in mind to play Joey, but he cast him after being impressed by the actor. "I was taken with how tough behind the eyes he was. I knew I could cut and darken his hair and give him a few scars and such, but I was most impressed with how he just pinned me down with those cold blues," said Kramer.

The film contains themes and allusions to the Brothers Grimm stories and other fairy tale archetypes. Kramer said, "I saw the film as a Grimm's Fairy Tale nightmare and around each corner was always some escalating evil lurking. Oleg (Cameron Bright) was a version of Pinocchio and he's on a journey to find his way back home to a real family where he can be treated like a real boy (unlike in the abusive household of his stepfather, Anzor). Along the way, he encounters iconic fairy tale-like characters representing both good and evil. We meet Divina the hooker who is a representation of the Blue Fairy (from Pinocchio) and a force for good. He also encounters the psychopathic pimp Lester, who represents the Mad Hatter from Alice in Wonderland. To me, Joey (Walker) was always the Big Bad Wolf who turns out to be a sheep in wolf's clothing and Oleg's real protector." The characters of Dez and Edele represent the evil witch from Hansel and Gretel, with their toy-filled apartment akin to the gingerbread house from the story. The film is set in the fictional suburb of Grimley, New Jersey.

Kramer dedicated the film to his influences Sam Peckinpah, Brian De Palma, and Walter Hill.

Though the film is set in New Jersey, with the exception of some establishing shots, it was largely filmed in Prague in the Czech Republic. Jim Whitaker’s cinematography heavily incorporated Steadicam and crane shots. Principal photography took place from June to August 2004.

Media 8 financed the film, and domestic distribution rights were acquired by New Line Cinema during post-production.

In an interview promoting the film, Walker admitted the film would spark a divided response, saying, "A lot of people are going to hate [it]. There’s lots of violence and the language is terrible. My father isn't affected by too many things, but he couldn't stand the language in this one. It's definitely not for everyone, but it was quite an exercise and I enjoyed the hell of it."

Asked about his sex scene with Vera Farmiga, Paul Walker revealed that there wasn't any kind of prosthetic application on the actress's privates.

== Release ==
To promote the film, New Line created an online interactive video game that recreates scenes from the movie.

Running Scared opened in the United Kingdom on January 6, 2006. In North America, the film was released on February 24, 2006. Kramer said the film was given little support by its distributor, who did not give the film an official premiere and nearly did not theatrically release it. He also said the trailers misrepresented the film, commenting, "due to MPAA rules (from what I was told), [we] couldn’t show children in jeopardy, so the entire hook of the film is missing from the theatrical trailer. It just plays like some low rent action/mob film with no edge."

=== Box office ===
Running Scared opened with $3,381,974 from 1,611 screens, for an average of $2,099 per theater. It went on to earn a total of $9.4 million worldwide, failing to recoup its modest budget of $15 million.

=== Home media ===
Running Scared was released on DVD on June 6, 2006. Special features included an audio commentary track with Kramer; Through the Looking Glass, a making-of featurette; and Kramer's storyboards of select scenes.

It received a Blu-ray release on June 11, 2013, with the extras from the DVD ported over.

== Critical response ==
Running Scared received mixed reviews from film critics. On the review aggregator website Rotten Tomatoes, the film holds an approval rating of 41% based on 131 reviews. The site's consensus reads: "This film runs with frenetic energy punctuated by gratuitous violence but sorely lacks in plot, character development and stylistic flair." On Metacritic, the film has a weighted average score of 41 out of 100, based on 30 critics, indicating "mixed or average reviews". Audiences polled by CinemaScore gave the film an average grade of "B" on an A+ to F scale.

Positive reviews praised the cast and the film's stylization. Angie Errico wrote, "This ultra-violent thriller from The Cooler's writer-director Wayne Kramer is filthy fun, with more wrinkles than a cheap suit and a climax like a Spaghetti Western shoot-out on ice." In a three-star review, Roger Ebert wrote, "Speaking of movies that go over the top, Running Scared goes so far over the top, it circumnavigates the top and doubles back on itself; it's the Mobius Strip of over-the-topness. I am in awe. It throws in everything but the kitchen sink. Then it throws in the kitchen sink, too, and the combo washer-dryer in the laundry room, while the hero and his wife are having sex on top of it." Ebert said the plot has flaws, but they are not a drawback to the enjoyment of the film.

Justin Chang of Variety described Whitaker's cinematography, which primarily used Steadicam and crane shots, as "[dazzling] with a desaturated palette that nevertheless has a rich, grimy luster". He also noted the film had an odd plot, which was disarming given it was shot in Prague rather than somewhere that looks closer to New Jersey. Sam Wigley of Sight and Sound said the vicious gangland depicted in the film resembles an "iniquitous fairytale realm", although it is dark, and "passes in a vertiginous blur of comic-book hyper-reality". Mick LaSalle of the San Francisco Chronicle also gave the film a positive review, praising Kramer's "showman instincts" as "he never lets the story retreat, regroup or redirect but keeps going for broke." Multiple critics said Walker's role in a grittier, darker film presented a new, interesting departure for the actor. Bright and Farmiga also received commendation for their performances.

Negative reviews critiqued the absurdities of the film's plot and its mashup of tones, while describing the hyper-stylized sequences as derivative of Quentin Tarantino or Tony Scott films. Though she praised the acting, Cynthia Fuchs of PopMatters said "the movie's gonzo energy, an easy hook, also detracts from its thematic complexities, eventually reducing them to clichés without frames or challenges." Carina Chocano of the Los Angeles Times said the film at times feels like "a parody of pornographic video game violence", while Andrew Pulver of The Guardian wrote, "So berserk are proceedings...that a strange zone of calm insanity is reached, the cinematic equivalent of the eye of the tornado", with cult status a possibility for the film. Other critics pointed out some of the villains felt like caricatures.

Tarantino himself contacted Kramer to express his admiration for the film. More recent reviews have critically reappraised the film. Christopher Holt of Film Obsessive wrote, "Where [the film] sets itself apart is in its blending of fairytale tropes into the narrative and visuals to create something unique", and said that Running Scared, alongside Crank and Shoot 'Em Up, fits into a "a sub-genre of action movie mashups that often went gonzo... it has the extreme violence of these films as well as a stubborn refusal to be pigeon-holed into any kind of mould".
