= Crash and Burn (2008 film) =

- DVD cover
- Written by: Frank Hannah; Jack LoGiudice
- Directed by: Russell Mulcahy
- Starring: Erik Palladino; Michael Madsen; Heather Marie Marsden
- Music by: Jeff Rona
- Country of origin: United States
- Original language: English

Production
- Executive producer: Robert Halmi Jr.
- Producers: Lincoln Lageson; Randy Pope
- Cinematography: Maximo Munzi
- Editor: Jennifer Jean Cacavas
- Running time: 81 minutes

Original release
- Network: Spike TV
- Release: March 30, 2008

Crash and Burn is a 2008 American television action crime thriller film directed by Russell Mulcahy and written by Frank Hannah and Jack LoGiudice. It stars Erik Palladino, Michael Madsen, and Heather Marie Marsden, and premiered on Spike TV on March 30, 2008.

== Cast ==
- Erik Palladino as Kevin Hawkins
- Michael Madsen as Vincent Scaillo
- David Moscow as Hill Dorset
- Heather Marie Marsden as Penny Middleton
- Peter Jason as Winston Manny
- Owen Beckman as Benny Dorset Tommy
