= Skylight (Art Lande album) =

Studio album by Art Lande / Dave Samuels / Paul McCandless
- Released: 1981
- Recorded: May 1981
- Studio: Tonstudio Bauer; Ludwigsburg, W. Germany
- Genre: Jazz
- Length: 40:27
- Label: ECM; ECM 1208
- Producer: Manfred Eicher

Art Lande chronology
The Story of Ba-Ku (1978)	Skylight (1981)	We Begin (1987)

Skylight is an album by American jazz pianist Art Lande, recorded in 1981 and released on ECM later that year. The trio features vibraphonist Dave Samuels and saxophonist Paul McCandless.

== Reception ==
Professional ratings
Review scores
Source	Rating
AllMusic	3/5 stars
The Encyclopedia of Popular Music	3/5 stars
The Penguin Guide to Jazz Recordings	3/4 stars

The authors of The Penguin Guide to Jazz Recordings called Skylight "another charming record ... unaffectedly sweet."

The AllMusic review awarded the album 3 stars.

In New Sounds: A Listener's Guide to New Music (1987), music critic John Schaefer wrote: "Piano, vibes, and reeds; a colorful ensemble, and a well-made record."

== Track listing ==
All tracks are written by Art Lande, except as noted.

Side I
No.	Title	Writer(s)	Length
1.	"Skylight"	Samuels	8:05
2.	"Dance of the Silver Skeezix"		6:30
3.	"Duck in a Colorful Blanket"	Lande; Samuels; McCandless	1:28
4.	"Chillum"	McCandless	5:14

Side II
No.	Title	Writer(s)	Length
1.	"Moist Windows/Lawn Party"		8:01
2.	"Ente"	Lande; Samuels; McCandless	2:00
3.	"Willow"	McCandless	9:09

== Personnel ==
- Art Lande – piano, percussion
- Paul McCandless – soprano saxophone, English horn, oboe, bass clarinet, wood flute
- Dave Samuels – vibraharp, marimba, percussion
