= Mark Isham (album) =

Studio album by Mark Isham
- Released: 1990
- Genre: Crossover jazz, electronic, new-age
- Length: 45:18
- Label: Gold Rush
- Producer: Mark Isham, Stephen Krause, Peter Van Hooke

Mark Isham chronology
The Emperor's New Clothes (1990)	Mark Isham (1990)	Emperor & Nightingale (1990)

Mark Isham is a studio album by American musician Mark Isham, released in 1990 by Gold Rush. It received the Grammy Award for Best New Age Album at the 33rd Grammy Awards in 1991.

== Track listing ==
All tracks composed by Mark Isham; except where indicated

1. "Honeymoon Nights"
2. "I Never Will Know" (Tanita Tikaram)
3. "Marionette"
4. "An Eye on the World"
5. "Blue Moon" (Lorenz Hart, Richard Rodgers)
6. "Ashes and Diamonds"
7. "Toward the Infinite White"
8. "Songs of the Flying Fish" (Isham, David Torn)
9. "Turkish Delight"

== Personnel ==
- Alex Acuña – drums, percussion
- Tom Bouman – cover design
- Terry Bozzio – drums
- Chick Corea – piano
- Douglas Brothers – photography
- Bernie Grundman – mastering
- Simon Hurrell – engineering
- Mark Isham – electronic sounds, keyboards, percussion, producing, synthesizer, trumpet
- Stephen Krause – engineering, mixing, producing
- Douglas Lunn – bass
- Larry Mah – assistant engineering
- Ed Mann – vibraphone
- Peter Maunu – acoustic guitar
- Melanie Nissen – art direction
- John Novello – organ
- John Patitucci – bass
- Rusty Striff – mixing assistant
- Tanita Tikaram – vocals
- David Torn – composer, guitar
- Peter Van Hooke – drums, producer

== Charting history ==
Chart	Peak chart position
Billboard Top New Age Albums	20
