= Not Forgotten (film) =

- Directed by: Dror Soref
- Written by: Tomas Romero; Dror Soref
- Produced by: Donald Zuckerman; Dror Soref; Michelle Seward
- Starring: Simon Baker; Paz Vega; Chloë Grace Moretz; Claire Forlani; Michael DeLorenzo; Ken Davitian
- Cinematography: Steven Bernstein
- Edited by: Martin Hunter
- Music by: Mark Isham; Cindy O'Connor
- Distributed by: Anchor Bay Films
- Release dates: May 1, 2009 (Austin); May 15, 2009 (Los Angeles)
- Running time: 96 minutes
- Language: English
- Box office: $142,055

Not Forgotten is a 2009 American independent horror thriller written and directed by Dror Soref starring Simon Baker and Paz Vega. The film takes place on the Texas-Mexico border and tells the story of a kidnapping plot involving the ritualistic cult Santa Muerte. The protagonist Jack Bishop's (Simon Baker) dark past is slowly uncovered as the kidnapping case unravels.

== Plot ==
Jack Bishop (Simon Baker) works as a loan officer in Del Rio, Texas, and is remarried to Amaya Bishop (Paz Vega), living with her and his daughter Toby Bishop (Chloë Grace Moretz) from his first marriage. Toby is kidnapped by an unknown perpetrator, leading to the involvement of the local police and eventually the FBI. The FBI begins inquiring in Jack's past, only to find out he has no official records dating back farther than ten years, and there is no evidence showing how his first wife had died or where she was buried.

A local petty criminal and repeated sex offender is initially thought to be the culprit, but it is revealed that the dangerous cult-like religious movement Santa Muerte, popular within Mexican criminal circles, might be involved. Jack's former life as a Santa Muerte worshiping hit man for the Mexican Mafia, named Roberto, is revealed as he tries desperately to find out who kidnapped his daughter. Though born in Oklahoma, his drug-addicted mother took him to Mexico when he was young. She later died, and Roberto had to make a life for himself on the streets, ultimately became an enforcer for the Mexican Mafia, and married a woman named Katie, with whom he had Toby.

Jack escapes from the FBI in Texas and makes his way across the border to Acuna. There he is accused of murdering a prostitute, who was trying to help him find Toby, and arrested. Jack escapes from Mexican jail and makes his presence in Acuna known, luring the assassin who was looking for him to come to his hotel. They fight and Jack beats the assassin, whom he then tortures for information about Toby's whereabouts. The assassin tells Jack that Toby was kidnapped by Katie, Jack's/Roberto's ex-wife. Jack breaks into the brothel that Katie now runs in Acuna and confronts Katie, who is herself furious that Jack/Roberto ran out on her without warning and took Toby with him. Jack believes Katie is lying when she says she does not know where Toby is, and murders her.

The real kidnapper is revealed to be Jack's new wife, Amaya, with the help of her cousin, the sheriff in Del Rio. Flashbacks throughout the film of Jack/Roberto strangling a man at Katie's behest as she looks on in delight reveal that Roberto has murdered Amaya's father, a degenerate gambler who owed a large debt to Katie and the Mexican Mob, and when he could not pay, Katie had Roberto kill him. Worse still, Amaya was in the room, hiding under the bed and witnessing all of this. Amaya set in motion an elaborate plan to emigrate to the United States and marry Jack/Roberto in order to punish him for murdering her father. Amaya and the sheriff lure Jack to the house where he committed the murder and set fire to the room where Jack is (the same room where he killed Amaya's father many years ago). But Jack finds Toby tied up on the bed in the room and frees her, and they escape the fire unhurt.

However, in a final twist, it is revealed that Amaya did not really kidnap Toby. When Amaya explained to Toby who her father really was, she was able to enlist the girl (using the magic of Santa Muerte) into helping exact an even worse revenge on Jack/Roberto. Amaya tells Toby that her father will kill her mother (which in fact happened earlier when Jack killed Katie) and that Santa Muerte magic would give her the strength to carry out a terrible revenge on her father for that murder. So Amaya purposefully let Jack and Toby escape to live happily for many years and then for Toby to kill her father. In the final scene, we see Jack and Toby fleeing deeper into Mexico on an old bus. As she sits and watches the countryside go by, Toby murmurs the same Santa Muerta chant for power that others (including Jack) have recited throughout the movie.

== Cast ==
- Simon Baker as Jack Bishop
- Paz Vega as Amaya Bishop
- Chloë Grace Moretz as Toby Bishop
- Claire Forlani as Katie
- Michael DeLorenzo as Casper Navarro
- Ken Davitian as Father Salinas
- Julia Vera as Doña
- Virginia Periera as Karen De La Rosa
- Isaac Kappy as Stoner Dude

== Development ==
The director began research on the film in 2004 by visiting, with co-writer Tomas Romero, the towns of Del Rio and Acuna, straddling the Texas-Mexican border. Soref had a prolific career as a music video and commercial director, working in the same company alongside such directors as Wim Wenders, Carroll Ballard, Jean-Pierre Jeunet and Bruce Beresford before beginning to transition into features.

== Production ==
Principal photography took place over the course of 28 days in New Mexico with three days of shooting on location in the outskirts of Mexico City and two days of insert pickups in Los Angeles. Several key cast and crew members came from Austin, Texas including the art director Ed Vega. In early 2009, Soref completed final post-production on Not Forgotten.

In 2016, it was revealed that the movie had been financed through an alleged Ponzi scheme run by Scientologists Michelle Seward and Dror Soref.

== Distribution ==
As a result of the film's critical acclaim at the 2009 Slamdance Film Festival, Not Forgotten was picked up for US distribution. The film was notable for being the only entry picked up for US theatrical distribution from that year. In April 2009, Anchor Bay Films acquired the distribution rights to the movie. The film debuted in a regional premiere Austin, Texas and officially opened at Grauman's Chinese Theatre in Los Angeles on May 15, 2009.

== Reception ==
The film has received generally negative reviews in the mainstream press. On the review aggregator website Rotten Tomatoes, 15% of 13 critics' reviews are positive.

However, Variety stated the film "satisfies as a solidly crafted and persuasively acted thriller that relies more on dark secrets than black magic" while The Hollywood Reporter commented, "Not Forgotten reminds you of a paperback you pick up at the airport...where the cover promises a pulp-ish combination of suspense, murder and...the story is so engrossing, you wish the flight were longer".
