= Red Lanta =

Studio album by Art Lande & Jan Garbarek
- Released: 1974
- Recorded: November 19–20, 1973
- Studio: Arne Bendiksen Studio; Oslo, Norway
- Genre: Jazz
- Length: 50:18
- Label: ECM 1038 ST
- Producer: Manfred Eicher

Art Lande chronology
Red Lanta (1974)	Rubisa Patrol (1976)

Jan Garbarek chronology
Triptykon (1973)	Red Lanta (1974)	Witchi-Tai-To (1974)

Red Lanta is an album by American jazz pianist Art Lande and Norwegian saxophonist Jan Garbarek, recorded over two days in November 1973 and released on ECM the following year. The title is an anagram of "Art Lande".

== Reception ==
According to ECM, Down Beat described it as "one of the finest albums ECM has yet released ... it is the interplay of the two artists that elicits the full richness of the music. Lande and Garbarek have intelligently channelled their virtuosity, forging a uniquely inspired vision. The result is enthralling."

The AllMusic review by Brian Olewnick awarded the album 2½ stars stating "One of the earliest recordings to embody what would come to be known as the ECM sound, Red Lanta is a series of piano/reed duets that have a Scandinavian starkness offset, somewhat unfortunately, by a soft sentimentality that verges on kitsch... this general approach proved extremely popular in the ensuing years, and devotees of ECM's later years will want to hear one of its points of germination."

Professional ratings
Review scores
Source	Rating
AllMusic	2.5/5 stars
The Rolling Stone Jazz Record Guide	4/5 stars
The Penguin Guide to Jazz Recordings	2.5/4 stars

== Track listing ==
All compositions by Art Lande

1. "Quintennaissance" - 5:35
2. "Velvet" - 5:37
3. "Waltz for A" - 3:43
4. "Awakening/Midweek" - 10:58
5. "Verdulac" - 7:07
6. "Miss Fortune" - 5:06
7. "Medley: Open Return/Cancion del momento" - 5:44
8. "Meanwhile" - 4:17
9. "Cherifen Dream of Renate" - 2:06

== Personnel ==
- Art Lande – piano
- Jan Garbarek – soprano saxophone, bass saxophone, flutes
