= The Seventh Coin =

- Directed by: Dror Soref
- Written by: Howard Delman; Michael Lewis
- Starring: Peter O'Toole; Navin Chowdhry; Alexandra Powers; John Rhys-Davies; Ally Walker; Jill Novick; Igal Naor
- Release date: 1993
- Running time: 92 minutes
- Countries: United States; Israel
- Language: English
- Box office: $31,023

The Seventh Coin is a 1993 independent drama film directed by Dror Soref and starring Peter O'Toole. It was the debut for Soref as a feature film writer/director.

== Production ==
The film was shot in Jerusalem, Israel.

== Plot ==
Emil Saber, a retired British soldier, collects ancient coins and Biblical artifacts. To complete his collection of King Herod's coins, Emil travels to Jerusalem to seek out the seventh and final one. In his search for the coin, Emil begins to lose his mind and eventually believes that he is the reincarnated Herod himself. This does not go well for two teenagers, American tourist Ronnie and Arab pickpocket Salim, who possess the coin. As Emil embarks on a murderous rampage, the teenagers must avoid him while also protecting the coin.

== Cast ==
- Peter O'Toole
- Navin Chowdhry
- Alexandra Powers
- John Rhys-Davies
- Ally Walker
- Jill Novick

== Reception ==
Stephen Holden, writing for The New York Times, described The Seventh Coin as having "plenty of snazzy local color but no idea what kind of film it wants to be".

The film won two festival awards including Best First Time Director at the Philadelphia Film Festival and the Silver Awards at Worldfest Houston.
