= Film Music (album) =

Compilation album by Mark Isham
- Released: 1985
- Recorded: 1983–84 at Russian Hill Recording in San Francisco, California, Fantasy Studios in Berkeley, California, and OTR Studios in Belmont, California
- Genre: New-age
- Length: 47:28
- Label: Windham Hill Records
- Producer: Mark Isham, Todd Boekelheide and Mark Adler

Mark Isham chronology
Vapor Drawings (1983)	Film Music (1985)	We Begin (1987)

Professional ratings
Review scores
Source	Rating
Allmusic	link

Film Music (1985) is an album originally released on vinyl by the American trumpeter and synthesizer player, Mark Isham.

It consists of extended tracks from the soundtracks of three films. The first track is from the soundtrack of the film Mrs. Soffel (1984). The second track is from the documentary The Times of Harvey Milk. This film won the 1984 Academy Award for best documentary. The material of the third track is from the Carroll Ballard film, Never Cry Wolf (1983).

Like Isham's previous album, Vapor Drawings (1983), the material on this is deeply atmospheric and emphasizes the use of synthesizers often blended with acoustic instruments. Of the three films represented, Isham is only credited with performing trumpet on track two, "The Times of Harvey Milk".

== Track listing ==
1. ”Mrs. Soffel” – 13:59
2. ”The Times of Harvey Milk” – 8:32
3. ”Never Cry Wolf” – 24:48

== Personnel ==
- Mark Isham – synthesizers, penny whistle (track 1), piano (track 1), trumpet (track 2), production
- Mark Alder – string arrangements and conducting (tracks 1 and 3), additional production (track 3)
- Peter Maunu – violin (track 1)
- Lyle Mays – piano (track 1)
- Rufus Olivier – bassoon (track 3)
- Bill Douglass – bamboo flutes (track 3)
- George Marsh – percussion (tract 3)
- Tucky Bailey – glass (track 3)
- Natalie Cox – harp (track 3)
- Annie Stocking – voice (track 3)
- Stephanie Douglass – voice (track 3)
- Kathy Hudnall – voice (track 3)
- Jeanette Spartaine – voice (track 3)
- Todd Boekelheide – engineer (tracks 1 and 3)
- Gary Clayton – engineer (tracks 1 and 3)
- Sam Lehmer – engineer (tracks 1 and 3)
- Randy Selgrin – engineer (track 2)
- Jack Leahy – engineer (track 3)
- Jesse Osborne – engineer (track 3)
- Bernie Grundman – (16 BIT digital mastering)
- Anne Robinson – (graphic design)

== Sources ==
- Liner notes from the CD release
