= Rubisa Patrol =

Studio album by Art Lande
- Released: 1976
- Recorded: May 1976
- Studio: Talent Studio; Oslo, Norway
- Genre: Jazz
- Length: 46:04
- Label: ECM; ECM 1081 ST
- Producer: Manfred Eicher

Art Lande chronology
Red Lanta (1973)	Rubisa Patrol (1976)	The Eccentricities of Earl Dant (1977)

Rubisa Patrol is an album by American jazz pianist Art Lande recorded in May 1976 and released on ECM later that year. Lande's Rubisa Patrol quartet features trumpeter Mark Isham and rhythm section Bill Douglass and Glenn Cronkhite.

== Reception ==
The AllMusic review by Michael G. Nastos states, "This recording, with the short lived ensemble Rubisa Patrol, may someday be considered as one of the classic ECM recordings of all time... This is contemporary improvised music nonpareil, a relaxed, well-paced program that is here to soothe and reassure you."

Professional ratings
Review scores
Source	Rating
AllMusic	4.5/5 stars
The Rolling Stone Jazz Record Guide	2/5 stars
The Penguin Guide to Jazz Recordings	3/4 stars

== Track listing ==
All tracks are written by Art Lande except as indicated.

Side I
No.	Title	Writer(s)	Length
1.	"Celestial Guests / Many Chinas"	Mark Isham; Traditional	9:57
2.	"Jaimi's Birthday Song"		3:39
3.	"Romany"	Glenn Cronkhite	8:42
4.	"Bulgarian Folk Tune"	Traditional	1:00
Total length:			23:18

Side II
No.	Title	Writer(s)	Length
1.	"Corinthian Melodies"		8:37
2.	"For Nancy"	Isham	6:06
3.	"Jaimi's Birthday Song"		2:48
4.	"A Monk in His Simple Room"		5:16
Total length:			22:47 46:04

== Personnel ==
=== Rubisa Patrol ===
- Art Lande – piano
- Mark Isham – trumpet, flugelhorn, soprano saxophone
- Bill Douglass – bass, flute, ti-tzu
- Glenn Cronkhite – drums, percussion

=== Technical personnel ===
- Manfred Eicher – producer
- Jan Erik Kongshaug – engineer
- Sascha Kleis – layout
- Franco Fontana – photography
