= Castalia (album) =

Studio album by Mark Isham
- Released: 1988
- Recorded: Earle-Tones Music in Hollywood, Los Angeles, California, Producers Studios in Hollywood, Los Angeles, California, Eastcote Productions, in London, England, Mad Hatter in Los Angeles, California, Russian Hill Recording in San Francisco, California
- Genre: Jazz
- Length: 57:43
- Label: Virgin Records America
- Producer: Mark Isham

Mark Isham chronology
We Begin (1987)	Castalia (1988)	Tibet (1989)

Professional ratings
Review scores
Source	Rating
Allmusic	3/5 stars

Castalia (1988) is an album by the American trumpeter/synthesist Mark Isham. The title refers to the mythical spring Castalia on Mount Parnassus in Greece.

This album features a larger ensemble of musicians than Isham's previous albums. Artists who performed on this album include guitarists David Torn and Peter Maunu, bassist Patrick O'Hearn, drummer Terry Bozzio and vocalist Gayle Moran. O'Hearn, Bozzio and Maunu were all in Isham's early band Group 87. Torn's atmospheric guitar work and O'Hearn's bass playing make a major contribution to the unique style of this album. Most of the pieces are in a long format, often beginning with subtle ambient textures and bursting into more active compositions. The song "In the Warmth of Your Night" is only available on CD and was available on Cassette.

The album's cover artwork features illustrations of the Lissajous apparatus.

== Track listing (longplay) ==
No.	Title	Writer(s)	Length
1.	"The Grand Parade"	Isham	5:50
2.	"My Wife with Champagne Shoulders"	Isham	5:26
3.	"A Meeting with the Parabolist"	Isham	13:09
4.	"Tales from the Maidan"	Isham, David Torn	6:35
5.	"A Dream of Three Acrobats"	Isham	8:02
6.	"The Gracious Core"	Isham	9:00

== Track listing (compact disc and cassette) ==
No.	Title	Writer(s)	Length
1.	"The Grand Parade"	Isham	5:50
2.	"Tales from the Maidan"	Isham, Torn	6:35
3.	"In the Warmth of Your Night"	Isham	9:10
4.	"My Wife with Champagne Shoulders"	Isham	5:26
5.	"A Meeting with the Parabolist"	Isham	13:09
6.	"A Dream of Three Acrobats"	Isham	8:02
7.	"The Gracious Core"	Isham	9:00

== Personnel ==
- Mark Isham – trumpet, keyboards, electronics, J.L. Cooper/Perkins MIDI trumpet (track 2), electronic percussion (track 2), flugelhorn (track 3)
- David Torn – lap steel guitar (track 1), electric guitar (tracks 2 - 4 and 6), acoustic guitar (track 6)
- Terry Bozzio – drums (tracks 1, 5 and 7)
- Mick Karn – electric bass (track 1)
- Peter Maunu – acoustic guitar (tracks 2 and 4) electric guitar (track 6)
- Paul McCandless – English horn (tracks 2 and 3), bass clarinet (tracks 2 and 6), soprano saxophone (track 2), sopraninorota saxophone, (track 2), oboe (track 3)
- Patrick O'Hearn – electric bass (track 3, 5 and 6)
- Bill Douglass – acoustic bass (tracks 3 and 6)
- Kurt Wortman – electronic drums and percussion (track 3), Xianjiang tambourine (track 6)
- Mark Adler - string arrangement (track 4)
- Gayle Moran – vocals (tracks 5 and 7)
- John Isham – Great Highland Bagpipe (track 7)
- Gary Clayton – Recording & Mix Engineer
