= Vapor Drawings =

Studio album by Mark Isham
- Released: 1983
- Recorded: April–May 1983, at Eastcote Productions, in London, England
- Genre: New-age
- Length: 44:11
- Label: Windham Hill Records
- Producer: Steven Miller

Mark Isham chronology
| Vapor Drawings (1983) | Film Music (1985) |

Professional ratings
Review scores
| Source | Rating |
|---|---|
| Allmusic | 3/5 stars |

Vapor Drawings (1983) is the debut solo album by the American trumpeter/synthesist Mark Isham.

It was the first album released on the Windham Hill label to belong to the electronic music genre. This album focuses more on Isham's talents as an electronic composer than future releases. “Something Nice for My Dog” is purely electronic and “Men Before the Mirror” only features a brief segment of trumpet at the beginning.

The tone of the album ranges from sweeping and melancholy (“On the Threshold of Liberty”, “In the Blue Distance”) to light and humorous (“Something Nice for My Dog”, “Mr. Moto’s Penguin”).

The most experimental piece on the album is “Sympathy and Acknowledgement”, the full title of the song being "Thank you for your Sympathy and Acknowledgement of my Disease". This piece is centered on a complex arrangement of electronic sequences and processed trumpet and piano recordings.

The most famous piece on the album is a military-style march titled “On the Threshold of Liberty”. Over the years this piece has appeared on several Windham Hill samplers. A reworking of this piece was used as the theme of the 2000 film Rules of Engagement starring Samuel L. Jackson and Tommy Lee Jones. “On the Threshold of Liberty” takes its title from a 1929 painting by the Belgian surrealist René Magritte.

All instrumentation was performed by Isham except additional electronic percussion and snare drum by former Group 87 drummer Peter Van Hooke.

Cover design and artwork by Tiare Ferrari featured on the back cover

== Track listing ==
1. ”Many Chinas” – 4:05
2. ”Sympathy and Acknowledgement” – 8:17
3. ”On the Threshold of Liberty” – 7:27
4. ”When Things Dream” – 2:43
5. ”Raffles in Rio” – 4:38
6. ”Something Nice for My Dog” – 2:49
7. ”Men Before the Mirror” – 6:07
8. ”Mr. Moto’s Penguin (Who’d Be an Eskimo’s Wife?)” – 3:18
9. ”In the Blue Distance” – 4:06
