= Art Lande =

American jazz pianist (born 1947)

- Born: February 5, 1947; New York, U.S.
- Genre: Jazz
- Occupation: Musician
- Instrument: Piano
- Label: ECM
- Website: www.artlande.com

Art Lande (born February 5, 1947) is an American musician who was born in New York City, United States.

Born in New York, Lande began piano at the age of four. He attended Williams College and moved to San Francisco in 1969. In 1973 he recorded Red Lanta, an album of duets with Norwegian musician Jan Garbarek. With Mark Isham on trumpet, he started the Rubisa Patrol group in 1976. They performed in the Bay Area and toured extensively in Europe by van. This group made two records for ECM: Rubisa Patrol (1976), Desert Marauders (1977), and one for 1750 Arch Records, The Story of Ba-Ku (1978).

In the early 1980s Lande taught at the Cornish College of the Arts in Seattle. He moved to Switzerland, where he taught at a jazz school in St. Gallen. In 1987 he moved to Boulder, Colorado to teach at Naropa University.

Lande has written many compositions, but is also known for his unusual and distinctive interpretations of popular and jazz standards. He has made several solo piano recordings devoted to such material, including The Eccentricities of Earl Dant in 1977, Hardball! (1987), Melissa Spins Away (1987), Friday the Thirteenth (1996, featuring thirteen Thelonious Monk compositions) and While She Sleeps (2005).

Although he is known as a pianist, Lande has performed and recorded on drums. He appeared in the 2021 film JazzTown, directed by Ben Makinen

== Discography ==
=== As leader/co-leader ===
Year recorded	Title	Label	Notes
1973	Red Lanta	ECM	Duo, with Jan Garbarek (soprano sax, bass sax, flutes) The title is an anagram of Art Lande's name.
1976	Rubisa Patrol	ECM	Rubisa Patrol Quartet, with Art Lande (piano), Mark Isham (trumpet, flugelhorn, soprano sax), Bill Douglass (bass, flutes), Glenn Cronkhite (drums, percussion)
1977?	The Eccentricities of Earl Dant	1750 Arch Street Records, Berkeley CA	Solo piano. "Earl Dant" is an anagram of Art Lande's name.
1977	Desert Marauders	ECM	Rubisa Patrol Quartet, with Art Lande (piano), Mark Isham (trumpet, flugelhorn, soprano sax), Bill Douglass (bass, flutes), Kurt Wortman (drums)
1978	The Story of Ba-Ku	1750 Arch Street Records, Berkeley CA	Art Lande and Rubisa Patrol: (Mark Isham trumpet, Bill Douglas (bass, flute), Kurt Wortman (drums), Bruce Williamson (sax), Mark Miller (saxophone, flute)
1980	Shift in the Wind	ECM	Trio, with Gary Peacock (bass), Eliot Zigmund (drums)
1981	Skylight	ECM	Trio, with Paul McCandless (soprano sax, English horn, oboe, bass clarinet, wood flute), Dave Samuels (vibraharp, marimba, percussion)
1986	Frontal	Planisphare	Laszlo Spiro (guitar, synthesizer), Reto Giacopuzzi (drums), Dusan Prusak (bass, flute), Walter Hoffmann (sax), Art Lande (piano)
1987	We Begin	ECM	Duo, with Mark Isham (trumpet, fluegelhorn, piccolo trumpet, synthesizer, percussion)
1987	Hardball	Great American Music Hall	Art Lande - Solo piano
1987	Melissa Spins Away	Great American Music Hall	Art Lande - solo piano
1989	The Three Billy Goats Gruff; The Three Little Pigs	Windham Hill	Told by Holly Hunter with Music by Art Lande
1990	Red Riding Hood; Goldilocks	Windham Hill	Told by Meg Ryan with Music by Art Lande
1992	Zanzibar		Nguyen Le (guitar), Art Lande (piano), Paul McCandless (soprano saxophone, oboe, English horn and bass clarinet), Dean Johnson (bass), Joel Allouche (drums).
1996	Friday the Thirteenth	Vartan Jazz	Art Lande Plays Monk - solo piano live at Vartan Jazz
1996	When Kentucky Was Indiana	Synergy	Art Lande (piano, drums) + The Russian Dragon Band: Khabu Doug Young (guitar), Bruce Williamson (saxophone, flute), Dwight Killan (bass)
1999	World Without Cars	Synergy	Duo, with Mark Miller (soprano sax, tenor sax, flute, vocals)
2000	The Tale of Two Bad Mice (with The Tale of Peter Rabbit and The Tale of Mr. Jeremy Fisher)	Madacy Records	Told by Meryl Streep with music by Art Lande. (Music for Peter Rabbit and Jeremy Fisher by Lyle Mays)
2002	The Book of Bhu: The Music of Khabu Doug Young	Synergy	Art Lande (drums) + The Russian Dragon Band: Khabu Doug Young (guitar), Bruce Williamson (saxophone, flute), Dwight Killan (bass), Shane Endsley (trumpet, drums), Mark Miller (saxophones, flute)
2006	Sioux Country	Tapestry/Capri	Art Lande with Peter Sommer
2006	Die Blaue Nixe	Berlin radio RBB	Gebhard Ullmann (reeds), Art Lande (piano), Chris Dahlgren (bass)
2007	When There's Love	CD Baby	Wendy Fopeano (Author), Art Lande (Performer)
2008	While She Sleeps	Blue Coast	Art Lande - solo piano
2008	Beautiful Love 2.0		Christina De Souza (vocals) with Art Lande (piano)
2009	Shape Shifter	Synergy Music	Art Lande (piano), Paul McCandless (oboe), Peter Barshay (bass), Allen Hall (drums)
2009	Down The Corridor (Chronicle of a Life)	(self-released through Bandcamp)	Boy Girl Band: Art Lande (drums, melodica), Clare Church (woodwinds), Ken Bernstein (guitar, bass), Emily Takahashi (piano)
2009	The Russian Dragon Band - Early Years: 1989, 1992	(self-released through Bandcamp)	Art Lande (piano, drums) + The Russian Dragon Band: Khabu Doug Young (guitar), Dwight Killan (bass), Mark Miller (saxophones, flute)
2012	Polar Opposites	(self-released through Bandcamp)	Art Lande (piano), Dave Peterson (guitar)
2012	A Field Guide to Sleep (Lullabyes For Adults)	Albert's Bicycle Music, CD Baby	Art Lande & Jon Scoville
2013	Kiss In A Shadow	Blue Coast	Art Lande - Solo Piano
2016	Trilogy	GiGi	Art Lande (piano), MAREK BA£ATA (vocals, Poland), GÜNTER WEHINGER (flute)
2016	Invitation	CD Baby	Evita Cabo (vocals), Art Lande (piano),
2016	Mindbender	(self-released through Bandcamp)	Boy Girl Band: Art Lande (drums, melodica), Clare Church (woodwinds), Ken Bernstein (guitar, bass), Emily Takahashi (piano)
2016	The Music of Italavia	(self-released through Bandcamp)	Funko Moderno: Art Lande (drums, melodica), Otis Lande (bass), Matt Flaherty (guitar), Stephen Thurston (piano), Mirco Altenbach (sax), Noah Fulton-Beale (trumpet), Tom Gershwin (trumpet), Sam Williams (sax), Otto Lee (sax)
2017	Leaping Forward	CD Baby	Josh D Reed Quintet with Art Lande
2018	Lubbock	Synergy Music	Art Lande (piano), Khabu Doug Young (guitar), Bruce Williamson (saxophone)
2021	The Silver Fox	(self-released through Bandcamp)	Arterik Quartet: Art Lande (piano), Erik Jekabson (trumpet, flugelhorn), Peter Barshay (bass), Alan Hall (drums)
2020	Resist The Eel Panda	(self-released through Bandcamp)	Art Lande (piano) + Flex: Dru Heller (drums) & Gonzalo Teppa (bass). The title appears to be an anagram

Main source:

=== As sideman ===
With Gary Peacock

- Shift in the Wind (ECM, 1980)

With Paul McCandless

- All the Mornings Bring (Elektra/Asylum, 1979)
- Heresay (Windham Hill, 1988)
- The Tale of Peter Rabbit, The Tale of Mr. Jeremy Fisher, and The Tale of Two Bad Mice, with Meryl Streep, narration (Windham Hill/Rabbit Ears, 1987)

With Maurizio Giammarco

- Love Ballads (Red Records, 1986)

== Positions ==
- Private Instructor, SF & Berkeley CA (1970–1977)
- Lone Mountain College, San Francisco (1978–1979)
- Cornish College of the Arts, Seattle (1979–1983)
- San Jose State College, San Jose, California (1983–1984)
- Jazz School of Migros Klubschule, St. Gallen, Switzerland (1984–1987)
- Jazz School Lausanne, Switzerland (1986–1987)
- Naropa Institute, Boulder, Colorado (1987–1999)
- University of Colorado, Boulder, Colorado (2006–Present)
