= The Montage Reno =

Residential building in Nevada, United States

Coordinates: 39.527716°N 119.813853°W

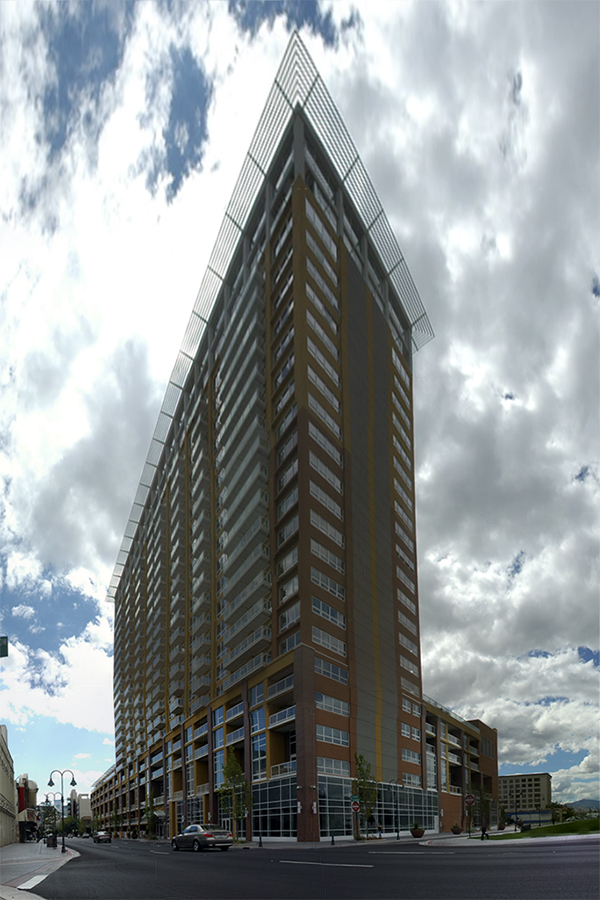
- Interactive map of the The Montage Reno area
- Former names: Sahara Reno (1978–81); Reno Hilton (1981–92); Flamingo Hilton Reno (1989–2000); Flamingo Reno (2000–01); Golden Phoenix Reno (2002–05)

General information
- Status: Operating
- Type: Residential
- Location: 255 North Sierra Street, Reno, Nevada, United States
- Opened: July 1, 1978; 48 years ago
- Renovated: 2006–08
- Owner: ST Residential LLC

Design and construction
- Architect: David Jacobson Associates (1978)
- Architecture firm: Antunovich Associates; Garofalo Architects (renovation)
- Main contractor: Del E. Webb Corporation (1978)

Website
- themontagereno.com

The Montage Reno is a high-rise residential building in Reno, Nevada. It previously operated as a hotel and casino from 1978 to 2005, under various names, including Sahara Reno, Reno Hilton, Flamingo Hilton Reno, Flamingo Reno, and Golden Phoenix Reno.

The former casino and hotel building was converted into a condominium tower from 2006 to 2008. This main building was formerly connected, via a skywalk over Sierra Street, to a smaller Virginia Street version of each main casino. This smaller casino on Virginia Street also had two food stores, such as a Subway sandwich shop. It is owned and operated by ST Residential LLC.

== History ==
=== Sahara Reno (1978–81) ===
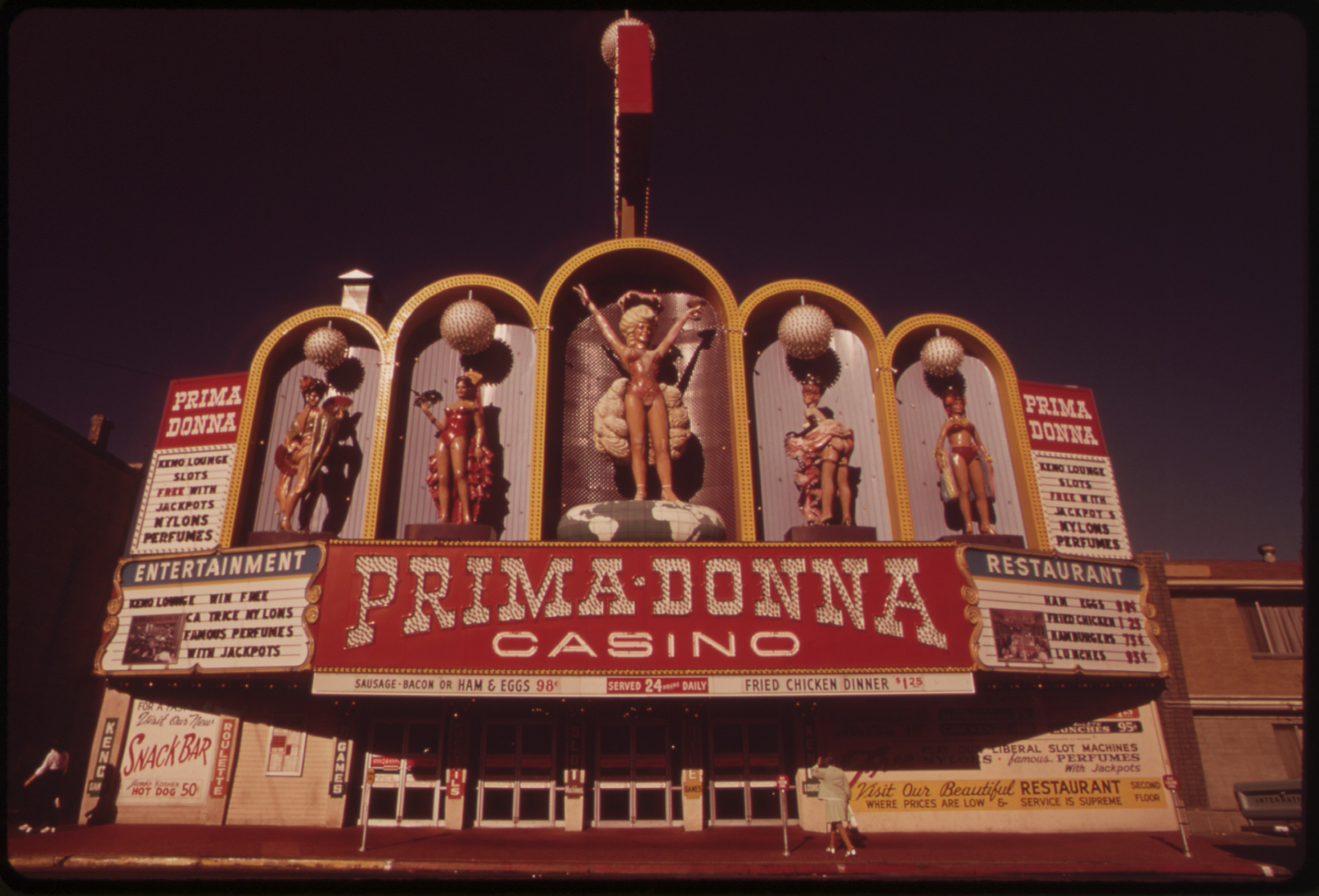
The Primadonna in May 1973

The main hotel/casino, on North Sierra Street, was originally opened in 1978 as Sahara Reno. It was owned by the Del E. Webb Corporation, which also owned the Sahara resort in Las Vegas. The Sahara Reno was designed by David Jacobson Associates and constructed by the Del E. Webb Corporation.

A separate casino building, located on Virginia Street, had previously operated from 1955 until 1978 as the Primadonna, before becoming part of the Sahara. The Virginia Street building, without the skywalk, was later reopened as Siri's Casino in 2014.

=== Hilton/Flamingo (1981–2001) ===
Reno Hilton logo

In 1981, the Sahara Reno became the Reno Hilton, then was renovated in 1989 and became the Flamingo Hilton Reno.

Flamingo Reno logo

In 2000, Hilton declined to renew its licensing agreement with the Flamingo brand, and the Flamingo Hilton Reno became simply the Flamingo Reno, returning to the original brand formed in the 1940s in Las Vegas.

The 604-room hotel-casino made a profit until its corporate owner Park Place Entertainment, owned by a subsidiary of Hilton Hotels, decided the resort was no longer profitable in a declining gaming market. They decided to close the property on October 23, 2001. It was soon sold to Vista Hospitality LLC of New York, which pledged to renovate and reopen the hotel-casino.

=== Golden Phoenix Reno (2002–05) ===
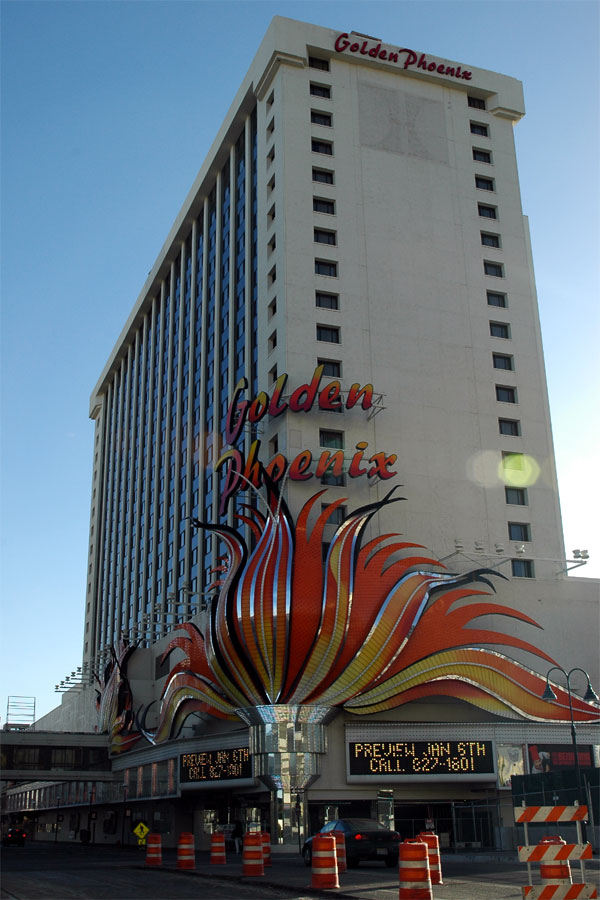
Former Golden Phoenix Reno

The new name—Golden Phoenix Reno—was announced in early 2002. The property's hotel reopened on April 2, 2002. It included 604 rooms, a Benihana steakhouse, a coffee shop, and a nightclub. The property's casino area opened in summer 2003, with an official grand opening. Prior to the casino's grand opening, the movie The Cooler was filmed at the Golden Phoenix.

Chicago real estate developer Fernando Leal put a bid in to buy the hotel-casino. Leal won his bid, and announced plans to convert the hotel-casino property into "The Montage" following a $170 million investment that would take the hotel property down to its concrete support columns, and rebuild condominiums based on the original platform.

Leal closed the Golden Phoenix on December 6, 2005, and his crews began gutting the hotel building in spring 2006.

=== The Montage Reno (2008–present) ===
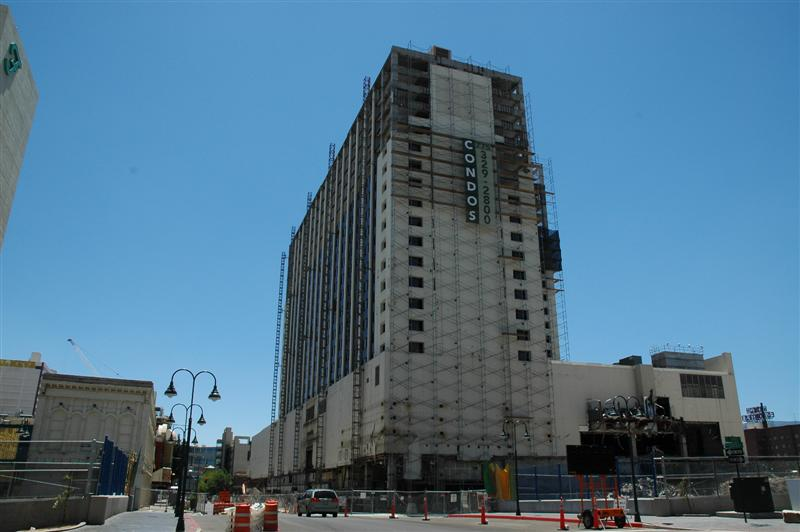
Building during condo conversion, July 2006

The Montage Reno was completed in April 2008. Originally, Leal envisioned The Montage Reno as a flourishing condominium resort with a signed lease for Ruth's Chris Steakhouse and the other retail pad planned for the high-profile Cafe Med. Both would fall out. And as a result, Leal would hand the completed project back to its lender to avert a foreclosure disaster in December 2008.

The Montage is now owned by Chicago-based ST Residential, a subsidiary of Starwood Assets and Holdings, a global company. The property is still marketed as a condominium resort with Reno's most exclusive condo amenities such as a 24-hour doorman, resort style pool deck, owners lounge and top grade finishes.
