= Crossing Over (film) =

- Directed by: Wayne Kramer
- Written by: Wayne Kramer
- Produced by: Wayne Kramer; Frank Marshall
- Starring: Harrison Ford; Ray Liotta; Jim Sturgess; Ashley Judd
- Cinematography: James Whitaker
- Edited by: Arthur Coburn
- Music by: Mark Isham
- Production company: The Kennedy/Marshall Company
- Distributed by: The Weinstein Company
- Release date: February 27, 2009 (United States)
- Running time: 113 minutes
- Country: United States
- Languages: English; Spanish
- Box office: $3.5 million

Crossing Over is a 2009 American crime drama film written and directed by Wayne Kramer. It follows illegal immigrants of different nationalities struggling to achieve legal status in Los Angeles: dealing with the border, document fraud and extortion, the asylum and green card process, work-site enforcement, naturalization, the office of counter-terrorism, and the clash of cultures. The film is based on Kramer's similarly titled 1995 short film. He produced the film alongside Frank Marshall.

== Plot ==
After immigrant Mireya Sanchez is deported, ICE / HSI Special Agent Max Brogan takes care of her son and takes him to the boy's grandparents in Mexico. Later, Mireya is found dead near the border. Brogan returns to the grandparents to tell them the bad news.

Taslima Jahangir, a 15-year-old from Bangladesh, presents a paper at school saying people should try to understand the 9/11 hijackers. The school principal reports this to authorities. FBI agents raid the home and ransack the girl's room, reading her diaries and a school assignment on the ethics of suicide. Theorizing her room is "too austere", they note that she has an account on an Islamic website. The profiler says this makes her look like a would-be suicide bomber. Taslima is not charged for this, but it turns out that she is staying in the U.S. illegally. She was born in Bangladesh and brought to the country at age three. Taslima's presence puts at risk her two younger siblings, who are US citizens because they were born in the country. Denise Frankel, the immigration defense attorney, suggests that instead of the whole family being deported, Taslima can leave for Bangladesh with her mother while the rest stay in the U.S.

Cole Frankel, an immigration examiner/officer, gets into a car accident with Claire Shepard, an aspiring actress from Australia. Realizing she is in the country illegally, Cole makes an arrangement with Claire whereby she will regularly have sex with him for two months in exchange for a green card. Eventually, Cole starts wanting to leave his wife for Claire, who does not love him and holds him in contempt. In a moment of clarity, Cole exempts Claire from completing the two months and arranges for her to get her green card.

Javier Pedroza worked in a copy shop and made extra money by providing counterfeit immigration papers. Claire had paid him for false papers before having made her arrangement with Cole. When Javier was killed, the authorities discovered her documents among his belongings, leading the immigration team to examine Claire's case more closely.

Special Agents from the ICE / Office of Inspector General confront Claire about inconsistencies in her immigration paperwork, and she admits to the sexual arrangement she had with Cole, leaving the country "voluntarily". Cole is arrested by ICE/OIG for corruption. His wife Denise Frankel adopts a girl from Nigeria, who has already been in the detention center for 23 months.

Brogan has a colleague, Hamid Baraheri. His sister, Zahra, is having sex with a married man, Javier Pedroza. The Baraheri family does not approve. Hamid's brother Farid plans to scare the couple, but things get out of hand: he shoots both of them and goes to Hamid, who helps hide the evidence. Brogan eventually starts suspecting Hamid's involvement.

South Korean teenager Yong Kim is about to be naturalized with the rest of his family, but starts to hang out with a gang and ultimately participates in a convenience store robbery for his initiation. Hamid happens to be at the same store and kills the other robbers but (due to his own guilt over his involvement in his sister's death) lets Yong Kim go free.

Gavin Kossef, Claire's boyfriend and an atheist Jewish musician from the U.K., pretends to be a religious Jew in order to get a job at a Jewish school, which allows him to stay in the U.S. When he reports to an immigration office, the immigration examiner/officer makes him demonstrate his familiarity with the Jewish religion in front of a rabbi visiting for other purposes – Kossef chants poorly but the rabbi gives his approval. After the test, in private, the rabbi requires Kossef to bring his "wonderful" voice to temple and take lessons from him to eliminate deficiencies in his knowledge.

Brogan investigates the murder of Zahra Baraheri and her boyfriend. He finds proof of Farid's guilt in the murders and Hamid's guilt in the cover-up. Disgusted by the brothers' actions, he turns the evidence over to the LAPD, who arrest Farid and Hamid.

== Cast ==
- Harrison Ford as ICE Special Agent Max Brogan
- Ray Liotta as Cole Frankel
- Ashley Judd as Denise Frankel
- Jim Sturgess as Gavin Kossef
- Cliff Curtis as ICE Special Agent Hamid Baraheri
- Alice Braga as Mireya Sánchez
- Marshall Manesh as Sangar Baraheri
- Alice Eve as Claire Shephard
- Justin Chon as Yong Kim
- Summer Bishil as Taslima Jahangir
- Melody Khazae as Zahra Baraheri
- Jacqueline Obradors as FBI Special Agent Marina Phadkar
- Naila Azad Nupur as Rokeya Jahangir
- Leonardo Nam as Kwan
- Mahershala Ali as Detective Strickland

== Production ==
Crossing Over was filmed on location in Los Angeles from April to June 2007.

The film originally featured a scene in which an Iranian woman is murdered by her brother in an honor killing. Following complaints that the plotline was unrealistic and offensive, the killing was presented as an intended beating which got out of hand, removing the dialogue referring to "honor" and "family honor".

Additionally, Sean Penn filmed scenes as an immigration cop. However, his scenes were cut due to the controversy over the honor killing plot, though producer Harvey Weinstein later claimed that Penn's agent requested his scenes be cut out of the film.

== Release ==
Although the film was shot in 2007, it was not released until 2009, and even then only in a limited theatrical run. The film's original running length was 140 minutes, but the film's producer (who had final cut privilege) was convinced to edit the film down to 113 minutes when Harvey Weinstein threatened to release the film straight to DVD and bypass a theatrical release altogether. In many countries outside of the US, the film went straight to DVD anyway.

The film was distributed in the United States by The Weinstein Company. It was given a limited theatrical release on February 27, 2009, and ultimately grossed less than US$500,000 in North America, and just over US$2.5 million internationally. The film has reportedly made another US$1.7 million in U.S. DVD sales.

== Reception ==
The film received generally negative reviews. Review aggregator site Rotten Tomatoes reports that 16% of 108 critics gave the film a positive review, for an average rating of 4.1/10. The site's consensus reads that: "Crossing Over is flagrant and heavy-handed about a situation that deserves more deliberate treatment, and joins its characters with coincidences that strain believability". Metacritic, which assigns a weighted average score out of 100 to reviews from mainstream critics, gives the film a score of 38 based on reviews from 31 critics indicating "generally unfavorable" reviews.
