= Love Wrecked =

- UK theatrical release poster
- Directed by: Randal Kleiser
- Written by: Stephen Langford
- Produced by: Lance Bass; Joe Anderson; Tracey Cuesta; Wendy Thorlakson; Sammy Lee
- Starring: Amanda Bynes; Chris Carmack; Jonathan Bennett; Jamie-Lynn Sigler
- Cinematography: Gary Capo
- Edited by: Chris Mistorni; Dennis Thorlaksen
- Music by: Stewart Copeland
- Production companies: Media 8 Entertainment; International Entertainment Corporation; Bacon and Eggs
- Distributed by: Media 8 Entertainment
- Release dates: November 2005 (Dominican Republic International Film Festival); January 21, 2007 (United States)
- Running time: 86 minutes
- Country: United States
- Language: English
- Box office: $3.5 million

Love Wrecked (also known as Temptation Island internationally) is a 2005 American adventure romantic comedy film directed by Randal Kleiser. Starring Amanda Bynes, it is a romantic comedy about a girl getting stranded with a rock star on a beach in the Caribbean.

The film premiered at the 2005 Dominican Republic International Film Festival. In the United States, Media 8 Entertainment failed to interest a theatrical distributor and, after nearly two years, the film was sold to ABC Family, on which it premiered on January 21, 2007.

== Plot ==
Jenny Taylor is a huge fan of Jason Masters, a world-famous rock star, but her efforts to meet him are constantly thwarted by her nemesis, Alexis Minetti. Hoping for another chance to meet Jason, Jenny takes a job at his favorite Caribbean resort, joined by her best friend Ryan.

Jenny sneaks aboard a party vessel Jason is on, and when he is washed overboard, she jumps in to save him. Though the pair find themselves marooned in a secluded cove of a seemingly deserted island, she soon discovers that they have landed a short distance from the resort. Jenny does not let on to Jason that they are not stranded so she can get him to fall in love with her.

Jenny is secretly helped by Ryan, who drives out to her location to provide her with supplies. When Alexis discovers Jenny's ruse by following Ryan, she also pretends to be marooned with them. While Ryan has been helping, he has also decided to act on his long-standing crush on Jenny, seeking advice on asking her out.

Ryan completely transforms himself, yet when Jenny sees him, all she talks about is Jason. He confesses he cannot stop thinking about her and kisses her, but when she protests that they are friends, he tells her that he is going home and drives off.

Jenny feels bad and after learning that the coast guard has called off the search for them and seeing mourning fans around the world, she tells Jason the truth about not being stranded. He becomes upset at both her and Alexis, promises to sue them both, and leaves them behind as he hitches a ride back to the resort.

When Ryan hears that a storm is going to hit the side of the island where Jenny is, he drives out to save her. As the storm builds, she gets stuck in the car he had abandoned to look for her. Ryan returns just in time to save her as the car is about to slide over a muddy embankment. When he takes Jenny into a cave and lights a fire to keep her warm, she realizes that he is the one that cares for her the most.

After the storm passes, Jenny and Ryan return to the resort, where Jason and his manager Brent Hernandez tell Jenny that they need her help to maintain the "stranded" story at a press conference. Ryan proclaims his love for her before he is thrown out the door by Brent.

At the press conference, Jenny tells everyone that her boyfriend is Ryan and that Alexis is Jason's fiancée, then walks off with Ryan. Some time later, while performing on stage in Winnipeg, Jason unhappily dedicates a song to his wife, Alexis, who is standing at his side.

== Cast ==
- Amanda Bynes as Jenny Taylor, an 18-year-old fan of Jason Masters who travels to the Sun Village beach resort with her best friend Ryan to earn money for college
- Chris Carmack as Jason Masters, a world-famous rock star who travels to the resort before his world tour
- Jonathan Bennett as Ryan, Jennifer's best friend who travels with her to the resort and who secretly loves her
- Jamie-Lynn Sigler as Alexis Minetti, Jennifer's arch-rival who also likes Jason
- Fred Willard as Ben Taylor, Jennifer's father
- Lance Bass as Dan, the phone operator
- Alfonso Ribeiro as Brent Hernandez, the resort's manager
- Kathy Griffin as Belinda
- Leonardo Cuesta as Gail

== Release ==
The original Director's Cut was premiered in 2005 at the Dominican Republic International Film Festival, held in Cofresi Beach, where the film was shot.

Love Wrecked was re-edited several times between 2005 and 2007 to tone down content, finally getting a 2007 release as a family film:

- 2005: Theatrical rating - PG-13 for Sexual References.
- 2006: Re-rating - PG for sensuality, crude Humor and language.
- 2007: The original U.S. theatrical version of the film received a PG rating from the British Board of Film Classification for "mild language, sex references and comic violence". It later played on the UK's Sky Movies channel.

The Region 1 DVD was released on March 13, 2007. The Region 2 DVD was released on September 17, 2007, and was the 4th bestselling DVD in it first week. In the UK, Love Wrecked was the first film released by Delanic Films, and was released on May 18, 2007. The film opened at no. 6 on the UK box office chart at 235 screens, and grossed £600,000.

== Reception ==
Love Wrecked received generally poor reviews. On its Rotten Tomatoes listing, 17% of critics gave the film positive reviews, based on 6 reviews. Christopher Null of FilmCritic gave the film 2 out of 5 stars, stating that "Bynes has made far better films". Brian Orndorf of DVD Talk said that "Love Wrecked seems like such innocent fun until the tale drains of excitement and the Bynes batteries begin to wear down".
