= Damage (2009 film) =

- Theatrical release poster
- Directed by: Jeff F. King
- Written by: Frank Hannah
- Produced by: Jack Heller; Jack Nassar; Joe Nasser; Dallas Sonnier
- Starring: Steve Austin; Walton Goggins; Laura Vandervoort; Lynda Boyd
- Cinematography: Tom Harting
- Edited by: Jamie Alain
- Music by: Peter Allen
- Distributed by: NGN Productions
- Release dates: October 5, 2009 (United Kingdom); January 28, 2010 (United States)
- Running time: 102 minutes
- Country: United States
- Language: English
- Budget: $10 million

Damage is a 2009 American action film directed by Jeff F. King. The film stars Steve Austin, Walton Goggins, Laura Vandervoort and Lynda Boyd. The film was released in the United States on January 28, 2010.

The film is hard edged, bare knuckles fight film that focuses on the tough choices people make in times of recession. Damage is the first in a multi-picture deal between Austin, Nasser Entertainment, and Caliber Media. Damage is a direct-to-video film; it did receive a theatrical cinema release in the United States on January 28, 2010.

== Plot ==
Released on parole after serving four of seven years in prison for second degree manslaughter, John Brickner (Steve Austin) moves to Seattle, where he gets a job as a construction worker during the day and a bouncer at a bar at night. One day, after work, he meets up with Veronica Reynolds (Lynda Boyd), the widow of the man he killed in self-defense. It is revealed that she petitioned to have John released on parole following numerous apology letters he had written to her over the years. She also tells him that her eight-year-old daughter Sarah (Katelyn Mager) is in need of a heart transplant, and he should be the one to cover the US$250,000 operation.

With the help of bar waitress Frankie (Laura Vandervoort), John locates fight promoter Reno Paulsaint (Walton Goggins), from whom he had initially rejected a job offer. When he realizes that the job is in the world of underground fighting, he once again declines the offer, despite Reno telling him he can score six figure earnings in the business. The next day, he is fired from his construction work, but he saves his boss from a heart attack. Later that night, he decides to enter the fighting tournament, defeating his first opponent. John continues to fight for Reno and Frankie and rises up in the ranks, earning thousands. It turns out, however, that Reno owes a syndicate over US$150,000 and must pay them within a week, or they will hurt Frankie whom he had covered for the debt.

After winning a gruelling fight, John rushes Veronica to the hospital after discovering her unconscious in her apartment, having slit her wrists after receiving a notice that an organ donor supplier has denied her request for a donor heart. During a fight, he defeats his opponent, but forfeits the match when he realizes that it is to the death. This results in Reno losing his wager and being roughed up by the syndicate. The next day, John is picked up by a tycoon named Veltz (William B. Davis), who turns out to be the owner of his former job. As a token of gratitude for saving his son-in-law's life from a heart attack, Veltz offers to cover John's US$150,000 wager for the main event or to clear Reno's debt. John chooses to clear Reno's debt.

The next night, John faces and defeats the defending champion Wendell Timmons (Tony Bailey). It is revealed that the Deacon (Donnelly Rhodes), a friend of Reno, covered his stake in the fight. In the end, John covers the payment for Sarah's heart transplant while Reno offers him another deal.

== Cast ==
- Steve Austin as John Brickner
- Walton Goggins as Reno Paulsaint
- Laura Vandervoort as Frankie
- Lynda Boyd as Veronica Reynolds
- Donnelly Rhodes as Deacon
- Adrian Holmes as Ray Sharp
- Jorge Montesi as Nestor Quinones
- William B. Davis as Veltz
- Tony Bailey as Wendell Timmons
- Katelyn Mager as Sarah Reynolds
- Phillip Mitchell as Munson
- Paul Jarrett as the Parole Officer

== Production ==
Damage began filming in Vancouver on October 17, 2008. Real fighters were hired as jobbers to make fight sequences more realistic. Steve Austin broke the nose of MMA fighter Paul Lazenby while filming a fight scene on October 22. The film was released on October 5, 2009, in the United Kingdom on DVD. Although this film is a direct-to-video, it did receive a theatrical release in the United States on January 28, 2010.

== Home media ==
DVD was released in Region 2 in the United Kingdom on 5 October 2009, it was distributed by Entertainment One.

DVD was released in Region 1 in the United States on March 23, 2010, it was distributed by 20th Century Fox Home Entertainment.

It was successful in DVD sales. "Damage," debuted in the Top Five on two key charts in the U.K., where the movie was released last Monday. "Damage" debuted at #5 on the iTunes Store chart in the U.K. and #3 in DVD sales through major retailer HMV.
