= Desert Marauders =

Studio album by Art Lande and Rubisa Patrol
- Released: 1978
- Recorded: June 1977
- Genre: Jazz
- Length: 38:35
- Label: ECM 1106
- Producer: Manfred Eicher

Art Lande chronology
The Eccentricities of Earl Dant (1977)	Desert Marauders (1978)	The Story of Ba-Ku (1978)

Desert Marauders is an album by Art Lande and Rubisa Patrol in June 1977 and released on ECM the following year. The quartet features trumpeter Mark Isham and rhythm section Bill Douglass and Kurt Wortman.

== Reception ==
Professional ratings
Review scores
Source	Rating
AllMusic	3/5 stars
DownBeat	4.5/5 stars

The AllMusic review by Michael G. Nastos awarded the album 3 stars stating "This is solid, contemporary improvisational music, a touch laidback, and makes one wish this ensemble would have carried on. They were special."

DownBeat assigned the album 4.5 stars. Michael Zipkin wrote, "Although Lande is the "leader" of the date, writing four of the five tunes, his presence—while always unquestionable — is never overpowering or excessively upfront. This is indeed a band, one that listens to one another, displaying a sort of flowing cohesion that is anything but predictable".

== Track listing ==
All compositions by Art Lande except as indicated

1. "Rubisa Patrol" - 15:57
2. "Livre (Near the Sky)" (Mark Isham) - 3:54
3. "El pueblo de las vacas tristes" - 5:50
4. "Perelandra" - 4:29
5. "Sansara" - 8:25

== Personnel ==
=== Art Lande and Rubisa Patrol ===
- Art Lande – piano
- Mark Isham – trumpet, flugelhorn
- Bill Douglass – bass, flute
- Kurt Wortman – drums, percussion
