= The Cooler =

2003 film by Wayne Kramer

- Theatrical release poster
- Directed by: Wayne Kramer
- Written by: Frank Hannah; Wayne Kramer
- Produced by: Sean Furst; Michael A. Pierce
- Starring: William H. Macy; Maria Bello; Shawn Hatosy; Ron Livingston; Estella Warren; Paul Sorvino; Alec Baldwin
- Cinematography: James Whitaker
- Edited by: Arthur Coburn
- Music by: Mark Isham
- Production companies: ContentFilm; Pierce/Williams Entertainment; Furst Films; Gryphon Films; Dog Pond Productions; Visionbox Pictures; Zero Gravity Management
- Distributed by: Lions Gate Films
- Release dates: January 17, 2003 (Sundance); November 26, 2003 (United States)
- Running time: 101 minutes
- Country: United States
- Language: English
- Budget: $4 million
- Box office: $10.4 million

The Cooler is a 2003 American crime drama film directed by Wayne Kramer, from a screenplay by Frank Hannah and Kramer. The film stars William H. Macy, Maria Bello, Shawn Hatosy, Ron Livingston, Estella Warren, Paul Sorvino, and Alec Baldwin. It follows a casino "cooler" whose mere presence at the gambling tables usually results in a streak of bad luck for the other players.

The Cooler had its world premiere at the Sundance Film Festival on January 17, 2003, and was released in limited theaters in the United States by Lions Gate Films on November 26, 2003. Baldwin and Bello were nominated for Golden Globe Awards and Screen Actors Guild Awards for their supporting performances, with Baldwin also nominated for the Academy Award for Best Supporting Actor.

== Plot ==
In Las Vegas, unlucky Bernie Lootz works at the Shangri-La casino as a "cooler" – a man with near-professional bad luck whose presence at a casino is designed to stop people from winning. A cocktail waitress, Natalie, takes no real notice of Bernie, who is smitten with her. The casino manager and partner, Shelly, prides himself on running a "classically" Las Vegas casino, and resents the new establishments that attract a lower clientele. The casino owners hire an advisor, Larry, whose ideas conflict with Shelly's traditional approach. Bernie informs Shelly that he is leaving town in a week.

After an encounter during which Bernie rescues Natalie from an aggressive customer, she appears to take an interest in him. Eager to prevent Bernie from leaving the casino, Shelly secretly prods Natalie into asking him out for a drink. They end up sleeping together, after which Natalie takes a genuine interest in Bernie. Although they begin seeing each other, Bernie is apprehensive due to his mostly bad luck. He reveals that he was once a gambling addict and became indebted to casinos, leading Shelly to force him into six years of work as a cooler. The couple encounter Bernie's estranged son Mikey and his wife Charlotte, and Bernie invites them to visit the casino.

Bernie is happy with his new relationship and his "cooling" abilities reverse, bringing good luck instead, much to Shelly's anger. When Bernie fails to cool Mikey at the craps table, Shelly realizes he is being cheated by Mikey. After Mikey wins a large sum at the casino, Shelly has him assaulted and Bernie agrees to repay Mikey's winnings. Though distraught, that night Natalie and Bernie confess their love for one another, and Bernie again becomes a good luck charm.

Shelly calls Natalie to his office and reminds her that he hired her to date Bernie so he wouldn't leave Vegas, not to fall in love with him, which has made him both happy and lucky. He forces her to leave town abruptly, which hurts Bernie and ruins his luck. Natalie does truly love Bernie, though, and returns, thus restoring Bernie's luck. At Bernie's motel, an argument between Shelly and Natalie leaves her seriously injured. When Bernie comes home, she reveals Shelly hired her to pretend to like him, but she truly fell in love with him. Bernie takes Natalie to the hospital emergency room after which he consoles her over her injured face.

Banking on his good luck brought on by Natalie's devotion, Bernie confronts Shelly and calls him a coward with nothing in his life but the casino. Shelly lets him go on the condition he pay back the $150,000, which Bernie wins at craps. Bernie leaves with Natalie. As they depart Las Vegas, a corrupt officer attempts to intercept them but is killed in a freak car accident, while Shelly is murdered by his casino partners to protect their corporate interests. Larry subsequently assumes control of the casino operations, while Bernie and Natalie successfully escape to start a new life.

== Cast ==
- William H. Macy as Bernard "Bernie" Lootz
- Alec Baldwin as Sheldon "Shelly" Kaplow
- Maria Bello as Natalie Belisario
- Shawn Hatosy as Mikey Lootz
- Ron Livingston as Larry Sokolov
- Paul Sorvino as Buddy Stafford
- Estella Warren as Charlene
- Arthur J. Nascarella as Nicky "Fingers" Bonnatto
- Joey Fatone as Johnny Cappella
- Ellen Greene as Doris
- Jewel Shepard as Hooker
- M. C. Gainey as Highway Patrol Officer
- Timothy Landfield as Player
- Michelle Lopez as Red Headed Craps Player

== Production ==
Though The Cooler is set near Fremont Street in Las Vegas, it was mainly filmed in Reno at the Golden Phoenix Reno over the course of three weeks. Golden Phoenix Reno casino employees and Reno locals were used extensively in the filming of The Cooler. The Golden Phoenix Hotel Casino is now a completed condominium project called The Montage. The hotel buildings demolished during the closing credits are the Aladdin, the Sands, the Landmark, and the Dunes hotels.

In an episode of the Sundance Channel series Anatomy of a Scene, director Wayne Kramer and members of his cast and crew discussed various aspects of The Cooler. In order to show Bernie's evolution from loser to winner, costume designer Kristin M. Burke dressed him in suits and clothes that progressively became better fits. Early in the film, the character resembles a boy dressed in his father's oversized clothing. By the end, Bernie is not only wearing the right size suit, but he has accessorized it with a brightly colored shirt and tie that represent his sunnier disposition. Lighting schemes designed by cinematographer Jim Whitaker also contributed to documenting Bernie's progression. In early scenes, his face is kept in the shadows, but later he is filmed in a spotlight and backlit to make him stand out from everything behind him.

The song "Almost Like Being in Love", which is used to mark Bernie's transition from mournful sad sack to winner, was written by Frederick Loewe and Alan Jay Lerner for the stage musical Brigadoon.

== Release ==
The film premiere was at the Sundance Film Festival. The Cooler was shown at the Cannes Film Festival, the Karlovy Vary International Film Festival, the Toronto International Film Festival, and the Deauville Film Festival, among others, before going into limited release in the United States. The film expanded nationwide on December 19, 2003.

With an estimated budget of $4 million, The Cooler grossed $8,291,572 in the United States and $2,173,216 in foreign markets for a total worldwide box office of $10,464,788.

According to the 2006 documentary film This Film Is Not Yet Rated, the MPAA originally rated the film NC-17 because of a glimpse of Maria Bello's pubic hair during a sex scene. The scene was edited in order for the film to gain an R rating and thus be shown in theaters. A director's cut has been broadcast by the Independent Film Channel and Cinemax.

=== Critical reception ===
The film received generally positive reviews from critics, with considerable praise for Alec Baldwin's performance. On Rotten Tomatoes the film has an approval rating of 77% based on 174 reviews, with an average rating of 6.8/10. The site's critics consensus reads: "A small movie elevated by superb performances." On Metacritic, the film has a weighted average score of 69 out of 100 based on 36 critics, indicating "generally favorable reviews".

Writing for The New York Times, A. O. Scott said, "The setting ... is a little tired, and the premise is pretty hokey. Mr. Kramer, rather than trying to discover anything new, is content to recycle familiar characters and story lines. The script ... and the direction are skillful, if occasionally gimmicky ... Luckily this picture is rescued from cliché by the quality of the acting, and Mr. Kramer wisely gives the actors room to work."

Todd McCarthy of Variety wrote, "Quite a cool movie about a couple of people at the bottom of the Vegas food chain."

Roger Ebert of the Chicago Sun-Times said the film "has a strange way of being broad and twisted at the same time, so that while we surf the surface of the story, unexpected developments are stirring beneath ... This is a movie without gimmicks, hooks or flashy slickness ... The acting is on the money, the writing has substance, the direction knows when to evoke film noir and when ... to get fancy."

In Rolling Stone, Peter Travers rated the film three and a half out of a possible four stars and added, "Wayne Kramer, who co-wrote the scrappy script with Frank Hannah, makes a potent directing debut and strikes gold with the cast... Top of the line is Baldwin, whose revelatory portrayal of an old Vegas hard-liner in thrall to the town's faded allure is the stuff Oscars are made of. From James Whitaker's seductive camerawork to Mark Isham's lush score, The Cooler places all the smart bets and hits the jackpot."

Mark Holcomb of The Village Voice said, "Taking a page from the Sin City cinema revisionist's handbook, The Cooler mimics the Vegas insider's perspective of Casino (without Scorsese's fetishistic attention to detail), the seedy/saccharine insouciance of FX's Lucky (devoid of quirky chutzpah), and the couch-potato glitz of NBC's Las Vegas ... What's left never gels as fantasy, drama, or romantic comedy... [the] film never amounts to more than a cute idea stretched to poker-chip thinness."

== Awards and nominations ==
Wins

- National Board of Review Award for Best Supporting Actor (Alec Baldwin, winner)
- Satellite Award for Best Supporting Actress - Motion Picture (Maria Bello, winner)
- Vancouver Film Critics Circle Award for Best Supporting Actor (Baldwin, winner)
- Dallas-Fort Worth Film Critics Association Award for Best Supporting Actor (Baldwin, winner)

Nominations

- Academy Award for Best Supporting Actor (Baldwin, nominee)
- Golden Globe Award for Best Supporting Actor – Motion Picture (Baldwin, nominee)
- Golden Globe Award for Best Supporting Actress – Motion Picture (Bello, nominee)
- Satellite Award for Best Actor – Motion Picture Drama (William H. Macy, nominee)
- Satellite Award for Best Supporting Actor – Motion Picture (Baldwin, nominee)
- Satellite Award for Best Original Screenplay (Frank Hannah and Wayne Kramer, nominees)
- Screen Actors Guild Award for Outstanding Performance by a Male Actor in a Supporting Role – Motion Picture (Baldwin, nominee)
- Screen Actors Guild Award for Outstanding Performance by a Female Actor in a Supporting Role – Motion Picture (Bello, nominee)

== See also ==
- List of films set in Las Vegas
