= We Begin =

Studio album by Mark Isham & Art Lande
- Released: 1987
- Recorded: January 1987
- Studio: Rainbow Studio; Oslo, Norway
- Genre: New-age, jazz fusion
- Length: 41:51
- Label: ECM; ECM 1338
- Producer: Manfred Eicher

Mark Isham chronology
Film Music (1985)	We Begin (1987)	Castalia (1988)

Art Lande chronology
As Time Goes By (1986)	We Begin (1987)	Hardball (1987)

We Begin is a collaborative album by American jazz trumpeter Mark Isham and jazz pianist Art Lande recorded in January 1987 and released on ECM later that year.

Professional ratings
Review scores
Source	Rating
AllMusic	2/5 stars

== Track listing ==
All tracks are written by Art Lande, except as noted.

No.	Title	Writer(s)	Length
1.	"The Melancholy of Departure"	Isham	6:32
2.	"Ceremony in Starlight"	Isham	7:34
3.	"We Begin"		6:19
4.	"Lord Ananea"		2:42
5.	"Surface and Symbol"	Isham; Lande	10:45
6.	"Sweet Circle"		4:09
7.	"Fanfare"		3:26

=== Notes ===
- “The Melancholy of Departure” takes its title from a 1916 work by Italian metaphysical painter Giorgio de Chirico.

== Personnel ==
- Mark Isham – trumpet, flugelhorn, piccolo trumpet, synthesizer, percussion
- Art Lande – piano, synthesizer, percussion
