= Bloom (company) =

American film entertainment company

Bloom Media
- Formerly: MDP Worldwide (1993–1998, 2000–2003); Behaviour Worldwide (1998–2000); Media 8 Entertainment (2003–2012)
- Industry: Entertainment
- Predecessor: Capella Films; Lauren Films; Araba Films
- Founded: 1993; 33 years ago
- Founder: Mark Damon
- Defunct: 2019; 7 years ago
- Fate: Acquired by WME-IMG in 2017 and folded into Endeavor Content in 2019
- Successor: Endeavor Content (now Fifth Season)
- Headquarters: Los Angeles, California, United States
- Products: Motion pictures
- Parent: Endeavor Content (2017–2019)
- Website: Official website

Bloom Media (formerly MDP Worldwide, Behaviour Worldwide and Media 8 Entertainment) was an American independent film entertainment company engaged in financing, development, production and worldwide distribution of theatrical feature films in various forms of broadcast media.

== Overview ==
The company was formed in 1993 by Mark Damon as MDP Worldwide (the "MDP" itself is short for Mark Damon Productions).

In 1998, it was sold to Behaviour Communications, a Canadian production company from the assets of Malofilm for $19 million, which subsequently changed its name to Behaviour Worldwide. In 2000, citing the struggles of Behaviour themselves, Damon's investors opted to buy back the company, which was reverted to the MDP Worldwide moniker.

MDP Worldwide posted net income of C$5.5 million ($3.4 million) on revenues of $33.5 million for the year ended September 30, 2002. The company had offices in Los Angeles, California and Montreal, Quebec.

In 2003, MDP Worldwide was renamed Media 8 Entertainment. On May 15, 2004, it was announced that Media 8 Entertainment wanted to focus on film production following the success of the Aileen Wuornos biographical film Monster, and chose to focus on eight movies budgeted on the $10-50 million range.

On October 14, 2004, Damon announced that he would resign his post as chairman-CEO of the Media 8 Entertainment studio. After leaving Media 8, Damon would eventually form a new studio Foresight Unlimited, to focus on production, with Media 8 executive Tamara Stuparich De La Barra serving as vice president of production at the studio.

In 2007, Media 8 Entertainment acquired the Spanish-based film companies Lauren Films and Araba Films, which then began to focus on the cinema theater business, until they became dormant in the 2010s.

In 2012, Media 8 filed for Chapter 11 Bankruptcy, and it was reorganized as Bloom Media following a merger with Capella Films. In 2017, Bloom was acquired by WME-IMG, with Bloom continuing to function as an entity within the company. In 2018, it was announced that Bloom's operations would be integrated into those of its parent Endeavor Content's, with Bloom's employees being transferred to Endeavor Content.

== Films produced by Media 8 ==
- The Last Harbor (2010)
- The Ramen Girl (2008)
- Man About Town (2006)
- Running Scared (2006)
- Wedding Daze (2006)
- Santa's Slay (2005)
- Havoc (2005)
- The Upside of Anger (2005)
- Love Wrecked (2005)
- Monster (2003)
- The I Inside (2003)
- 11:14 (2003)
- The United States of Leland (2003)

=== MDP Worldwide ===
- FeardotCom (2002)
- Extreme Ops (2002)
- The Musketeer (2001)
- The Body (2001)
- Knock Off (1998)
- Orgazmo (1997)
- Deceiver (1997)
- The Blackout (1997)
- The Second Jungle Book: Mowgli & Baloo (1997)
- The Jungle Book (1994)
- Men of War (1994)
- Bad Blood (1994)
- Inner Sanctum 2 (1994)
- Deadly Heroes (1993)

=== Behaviour Worldwide ===
- Love & Sex (2000)
- Eye of the Beholder (1999)
- Grizzly Falls (1999)
- The Price of Kissing (1997)

== Films distributed by Media 8 ==
- The Last Harbor (2010)
- The Ramen Girl (2008)
- Local Color (2006)
- Man About Town (2006)
- Running Scared (2006)
- Santa's Slay (2005)
- Havoc (2005)
- The Upside of Anger (2005)
- Love Wrecked (2005)
- Monster (2003)
- 11:14 (2003)
- The I Inside (2003)

=== MDP Worldwide ===
- Free Money (1998)
- The Jungle Book (1994)
- Crackerjack (1994)
- Bad Blood (1994)
- Night Eyes 3 (1993)
- Attack of the 50 Ft. Woman (1993)

=== Behaviour Worldwide ===
- Love & Sex (2000)
- Eye of the Beholder (1999)
- Grizzly Falls (1999)
- The Price of Kissing (1997)
