= Dror Soref =

American film director

- דרור סורף
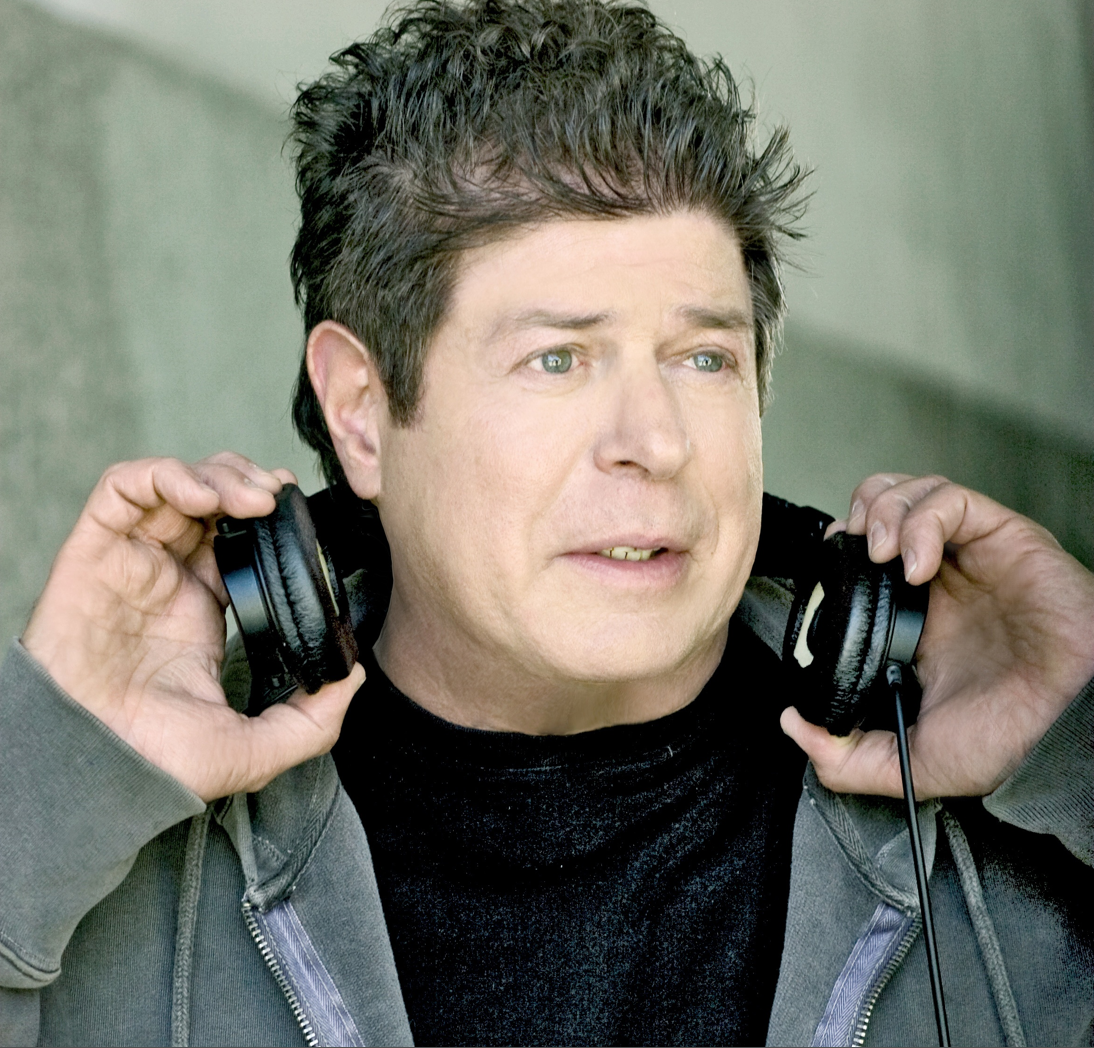
- Photo for the promotion of the film Not Forgotten
- Born: Dror Soref; Israel
- Occupations: Writer, Director, and Producer
- Years active: 1983–present

Dror Soref (Hebrew: דרור סורף) is a filmmaker and social reformer who made his directorial debut with the I Love Rocky Road music video for a then unknown "Weird Al" Yankovic in 1983, after attending USC School of Cinema. Soref later directed the Best Short Film nominated Platinum Blonde, which drew the attention of Paramount Studios President. Consequently, Soref was retained under contract to develop projects at Paramount Studios for him to write and direct. With the help of Paramount, The Seventh Coin became Soref's debut as a feature film writer/director. Starring Peter O'Toole, The Seventh Coin won two festival awards in 1993, including Best Picture. Throughout the following decade Soref directed or executive produced over a hundred commercials and music videos. In 2003, Soref returned to feature films, co-producing Basic for Columbia Pictures, starring John Travolta and Samuel L. Jackson. In 2009 Soref wrote, directed and produced the critically acclaimed and Saturn Award nominee for Best Science Fiction Not Forgotten starring Simon Baker, Paz Vega and Chloë Grace Moretz.

== Early life and education ==
Dror Soref was born and raised in Israel and is of Spanish ancestry. He attended the University of Haifa, earning degrees in economics, sociology and anthropology. During his first year at the university, Soref founded a repertory theater, bringing to the stage original material with politically satirical content. His studies were interrupted when as a lieutenant in the elite Golani Brigade of the Israel Defense Forces, Soref was called for service during several military conflicts, including the Yom Kippur War. The unit under Soref's command was cited for excellence by the IDF Chief-of-Staff.

While a student, Soref wrote frequently on Israeli–Palestinian relations, and during his second year at university, with fellow IDF retired officers and others, he founded a new national political party which played a key role in the future coalition government of Israeli Prime Minister Yitzhak Rabin in the early nineties. At the age of 23, while a third-year student, Soref was nominated by his party to run for the Knesset. One of Soref's articles, Envisioning the Israeli-Palestinian Peace, incorporates the same principles as the first peace treaty between the parties, known as the Oslo Accords (1993), but written more than a decade earlier. A number of books have been written about the movement in which Soref did participate during these years. University, State and Society in Israel by Professor Shlomo Swirski, outlines the political consciousness and insight of a movement mainly formed by Latin American and Arab students and some Israelis. In Y. Rubin's semi-autobiographical book, The Hypochondriac, the author portrays Soref as the embodiment of the mythical persona of the 'ideal' Israeli youth.

Soref's introduction to filmmaking came during his last year at the University of Haifa, when he was invited to attend a film workshop conducted by Benjamin Koretsky, Roman Polanski's cinematography teacher back in the Lodz Film School in Poland. To pursue film studies, Soref emigrated to the United States, first attending San Francisco Art Institute, and then the Cinema School of the University of Southern California (USC).

== Career ==
In the mid-eighties, following USC, Soref was hired to direct "I Love Rocky Road", a music video for an unknown rock parodist at the time, "Weird Al" Yankovic. The video helped establish Yankovic as an upcoming star, and is included in several of his greatest hits albums such as 'Weird Al' Yankovic: The Ultimate Video Collection and 'Weird Al' Yankovic: The Videos. Success in music video field lead Soref to directing Platinum Blonde, an inspirational short film starring Karen Black and a fourteen-year-old Elizabeth Berkley. As the creative force behind Platinum Blonde, Soref was profiled in the Los Angeles Times, Premiere Magazine, and The Hollywood Reporter. Platinum Blonde was nominated for the Gold Hugo Award for Best Short Film at the Chicago International Film Festival and drew the attention of Paramount Studio's President. Consequently, Soref was retained under contract to develop projects at Paramount Studios for him to write and direct.

With the help of Paramount, The Seventh Coin became Soref's debut as a feature film writer/director. Starring Peter O'Toole, the film won two festival awards including Best First Time Director at the Philadelphia Film Festival and the Silver Awards at Worldfest Houston. Despite the film's cash budget being less than $900,000, The Daily Variety described it as "handsomely produced, medium budget indie". The film went on to garner $3.2 million in worldwide box office. In 1997 Soref dabbled in episodic television, directing a number of episodes of Power Rangers, the hit children's TV series.

While at Paramount, Soref founded Orbit Productions, serving as one of its commercial directors. Soref executive-produced or directed over one hundred TV commercials or music videos, leading Orbit to become one of the fastest growing commercial production companies at that time with clients including such brands as Ford, Coca-Cola, Toyota, McDonald's, and Fujifilm. Some of Orbit's spots have been featured on the Super Bowl and Academy Awards telecasts. Soref later parlayed a successful career in television and commercials into feature films, signing a multiple-picture deal with Mike Medavoy's Phoenix Pictures with one of them for Soref to direct. The first motion picture under this deal was Basic starring John Travolta and Samuel L. Jackson, released by Columbia Pictures.

In early 2009, Soref completed Not Forgotten, a film he directed, co-wrote and produced, starring Simon Baker, Paz Vega, Claire Forlani, and Chloë Grace Moretz in her first major film role. The film was selected for a Special Screening at the Slamdance Film Festival, where all its screenings were sold out before being picked up for distribution by Anchor Bay Films. Both The Hollywood Reporter and Daily Variety gave the film rave reviews. The film was released on DVD and Blu-ray in the fall of 2009 and on streaming Netflix in early 2010.

In June 2011, Soref served as one of the producers of Twist: An American Musical based on the Charles Dickens' classic. The play was written by William F. Brown (The Wiz), and was choreographed and directed by Emmy award-winning Debbie Allen. It was staged at The Pasadena Playhouse to rave reviews.

In 2012 Soref directed the experimental short film Morning, exploring the parallels between the love of Man and God, and that of man and woman. Despite its controversial theme, and the fact that it was not presented for viewing, the film was invited to a number of festivals. So far, Soref only accepted the invitation of two festivals, including the Seattle Erotic Art Festival whose program director proclaimed "without a doubt Morning was the most talked-about film of the Festival".

In January 2014, Soref founded a multiplatform studio titled Nova Filmhouse, Inc. According to the company's website the studio offers content across all platforms "from smartphone to multiplex". Former New Line Cinema president of production, Sara Risher, serves as Nova's President of Motion Pictures, Television president- Gil Junger (Producer/ Writer/ Director); and Digital Media president- Evette Vargas (content creator, writer/producer/ director). Chairman of the Board is Charles J. Weber, formally the President/ CEO of Lucasfilm Ltd. Soref is the CEO of the company.

== Social Reformer and Philanthropy ==
Soref has been a campaigner for humanitarian endeavors since youth, from caring and feeding the homeless on skid row locally, to support causes in the third world, while fighting injustice anywhere. His activity with non-profit organizations includes the Aleph Institute (a Jewish-based association providing crucial assistance to families whose loved ones are in prison or serve in the US Armed Forces), Equal Justice Under the Law (dedicated to ending inequality in the justice system), and the Greater Los Angeles Chamber of Commerce (where he served as a Director of the Institute's Board, promoting job opportunities and internships for Los Angeles youth). Most recently Soref founded RCI (Rebel with a Cause Institute) dedicated to guiding aspiring talent to create movies, TV and other content fostering principled ideals. SorefSocialReform.org

== Controversies ==
On September 11, 2015, Dror Soref, was charged with numerous accusations relating to the movie Not Forgotten.

Following an exhaustive five-week-long preliminary hearing, all charges were subsequently dropped and Soref was fully exonerated by the Superior Court Judge.

Following Soref's exoneration, he has filed a $40 million lawsuit against the government agencies that, according to Soref, have engaged in egregious miscarriage of justice at great personal and financial cost.

== Filmography ==
Dror Soref has Directed two independent feature films working with actors including Peter O'Toole, Simon Baker, and Paz Vega.

| Year | Film/TV/Stage | Credited as | | |
| Year | Film/TV/Stage | Director | Producer | Writer |
|---|---|---|---|---|
| 1986 | Hollywood Zap! | | Yes | |
| 1988 | Platinum Blonde (Short) | Yes | Yes | |
| 1993 | The Seventh Coin | Yes | | Yes |
| 1997 | Power Rangers (Various Episodes) | Yes | No | No |
| 2003 | Basic | | Yes | |
| 2009 | Not Forgotten | Yes | Yes | Yes |
| 2011 | Twist: An American Musical | No | Yes | No |
| 2012 | Morning | Yes | Yes | No |

In addition, Soref has directed or executive produced over 100 music videos and commercials mostly through his production company Orbit Entertainment Group.

| Year | Song | Band | Notes |
|---|---|---|---|
| 1983 | "I Love Rocky Road" | "Weird Al" Yankovic | First Music Video |
