= Frank Hannah =

Screenwriter

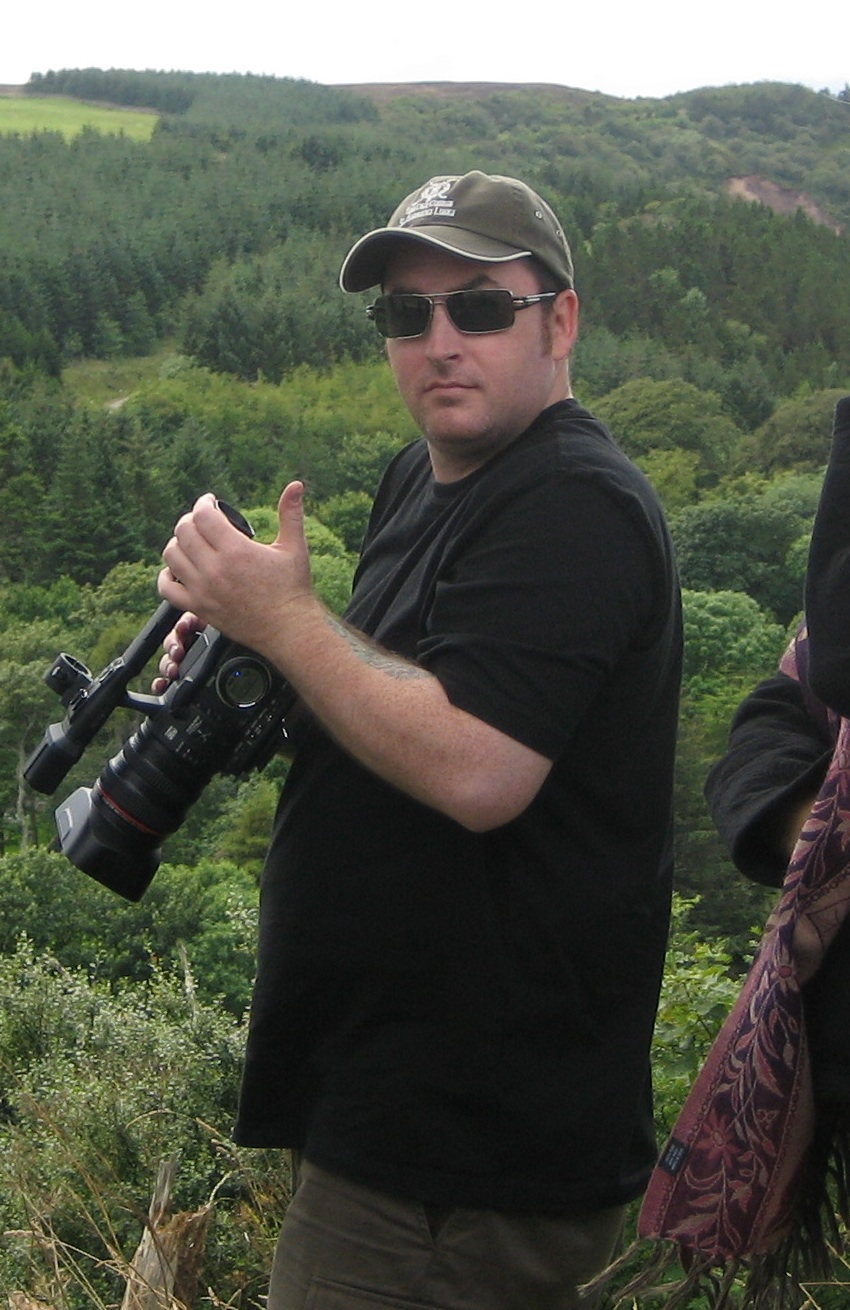
- Frank Hannah, 23 August 2008
- Born: Francis Michael Hannah; 15 February 1971 (age 55); Clydebank, Scotland
- Years active: 1997-present

Frank Hannah (born 15 February 1971 in Clydebank, Scotland) is a Scottish-born screenwriter and filmmaker.

== Career ==
He wrote the film The Cooler with Wayne Kramer. Hannah wrote the script Damage specifically for former wrestler Steve Austin. Hannah wrote the script for the action movie Hunt to Kill, again with Steve Austin.

== Awards ==
Hannah was nominated for a 2004 Golden Satellite Award and a 2004 Edgar Allan Poe Award (along with Wayne Kramer) for his screenplay to The Cooler.

== Filmography ==
=== Feature Film ===
- Princess (TBA)
- Hunt to Kill (2011)
- Damage (2010)
- Homecoming (2008) (uncredited)
- The Cooler (2003)

=== Television ===
- Crash & Burn (2008)
