= Wayne Kramer (filmmaker) =

American film director

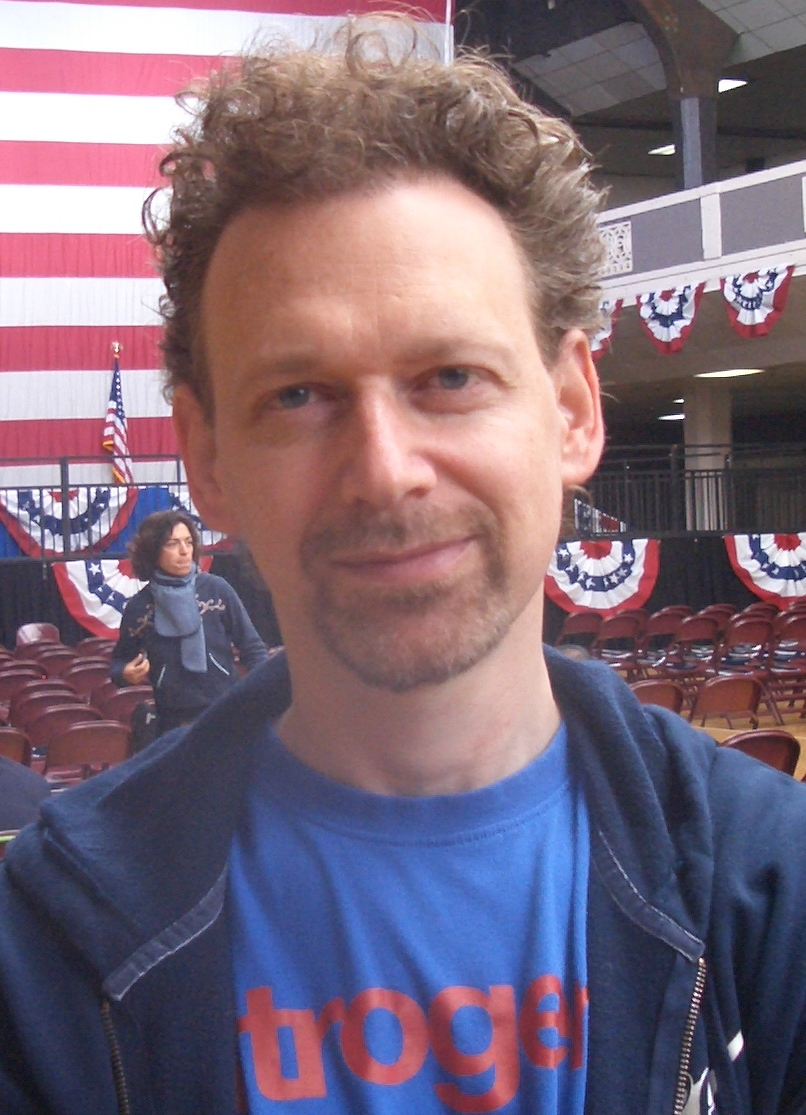
- Kramer on the set of Crossing Over in 2007
- Born: 26 May 1965 (age 60); Johannesburg-Kew, South Africa
- Occupations: Film director, screenwriter, producer, storyboard artist
- Years active: 1992–present
- Spouse: Jodi Kramer

Wayne Kramer (born 26 May 1965) is an American filmmaker and storyboard artist. He has written and directed films such as the 2003 film The Cooler, which garnered an Oscar nomination for its star Alec Baldwin, as well as two Golden Globe nominations for Baldwin and Maria Bello. He also adapted his 1995 short film Crossing Over into a feature-length version which starred Harrison Ford, Ray Liotta, Ashley Judd and Jim Sturgess, and was released by the Weinstein Company in 2009. He also wrote the screenplay for the film Mindhunters, but the final script was heavily rewritten by others and bore little resemblance to Kramer's original work.

== Career ==
Kramer first began directing with the 1992 film Blazeland, which was never completed. Kramer has since commented that the process was "an absolute nightmare from beginning to end" and that he has no plans to finish or release the film. His first official release, The Cooler, was selected for competition in the 2003 Sundance Film Festival. Later the same year The Cooler received a 2003 Special Mention for Excellence in Filmmaking from the National Board of Review. A year later, he was nominated for a Golden Satellite Award and an Edgar Allan Poe Award for writing the film's screenplay.

In 2006, Kramer directed the action thriller Running Scared for Media 8 Entertainment. The film starred Paul Walker and Cameron Bright. Although Running Scared did not fare well at the box office, it has gone on to become a hugely profitable DVD title for Media 8.

In 2006, Kramer was one of several filmmakers interviewed for the Kirby Dick documentary This Film Is Not Yet Rated, in which he discusses the apparent absurdity of the fact The Cooler was given an NC-17 certificate by the MPAA simply due to a few seconds long shot of its lead actress' pubic hair.

Kramer directed Pawn Shop Chronicles, which was released on 12 July 2013. The film starred Vincent D'Onofrio, Chi McBride, Paul Walker, Kevin Rankin, Matt Dillon, Elijah Wood, and Brendan Fraser.

== Filmography ==
=== Film ===
Year	Title	Director	Writer	Producer	Distribution Company
1992	Blazeland	Yes	Yes	No	
2003	The Cooler	Yes	Yes	No	Lionsgate
2004	Mindhunters	No	Yes	No	The Weinstein Company
2006	Running Scared	Yes	Yes	No	Media 8 Entertainment
2009	Crossing Over	Yes	Yes	Yes	The Weinstein Company
2013	Pawn Shop Chronicles	Yes	No	Executive	Anchor Bay Films

=== Recurring collaborators ===
Collaborators	The Cooler (2003)	Running Scared (2006)	Crossing Over (2009)	Pawn Shop Chronicles (2013)	Total
Michael Cudlitz		✘	✘	✘	3
Arthur J. Nascarella	✘	✘			2
Paul Walker		✘		✘	2
