= List of science fiction films of the 2000s =

This is a list of science fiction films released in the 2000s. These films include core elements of science fiction, but can cross into other genres. They have been released to a cinema audience by the commercial film industry and are widely distributed with reviews by reputable critics. Collectively, the science fiction films from the 2000s have received six Academy Awards, twenty Saturn Awards, two Hugo Awards, one Nebula Award, five BAFTA awards, and six Magritte Awards. However, these films also received 17 Golden Raspberry Awards.

== List ==
2000
Title	Director	Cast	Country	Subgenre/notes
The 6th Day	Roger Spottiswoode	Arnold Schwarzenegger, Tony Goldwyn, Michael Rapaport	United States	Action thriller
Amazone	Philippe de Broca	Jean-Paul Belmondo, Arielle Dombasle, Patrick Bouchitey	France; Spain	Adventure comedy
Battlefield Earth	Roger Christian	John Travolta, Barry Pepper, Forest Whitaker	United States	Action (Note: Received Razzie Awards for Worst Picture, Worst Actor, Worst Screen Couple, Worst Supporting Actor, Worst Supporting Actress, Worst Director and Worst Screenplay. In 2004 it received an additional Razzie Award for Worst 'Drama' Of Our First 25 Years.)
The Cell	Tarsem Singh	Jennifer Lopez, Vince Vaughn, Vincent D'Onofrio	United States	Psychological thriller
Escaflowne	Kazuki Akane		Japan	Action anime
Godzilla vs. Megaguirus	Masaaki Tezuka	Misako Tanaka, Shosuke Tanihara, Masato Ibu	Japan	Monster movie
Happy Accidents	Brad Anderson	Marisa Tomei, Vincent D'Onofrio	United States	Romantic comedy
Hollow Man	Paul Verhoeven	Kevin Bacon, Elisabeth Shue, Josh Brolin	United States	Action thriller
I.K.U.	Shu Lea Cheang	Aja	Japan	Adult film
Mission to Mars	Brian De Palma	Gary Sinise, Tim Robbins, Don Cheadle	United States	Adventure drama
Pitch Black	David N. Twohy	Radha Mitchell, Vin Diesel, Cole Hauser	United States	Thriller
Possible Worlds	Robert Lepage	Tilda Swinton, Tom McCamus, Sean McCann	Canada	Crime mystery
Red Planet	Antony Hoffman	Val Kilmer, Carrie-Anne Moss, Benjamin Bratt, Tom Sizemore	United States	Action thriller
Space Cowboys	Clint Eastwood	Clint Eastwood, Tommy Lee Jones, Donald Sutherland, James Garner	United States	Action adventure
Supernova	Thomas Lee	James Spader, Angela Bassett, Robert Forster, Lou Diamond Phillips	United States	Horror thriller
Titan A.E.	Don Bluth, Gary Goldman	Matt Damon (voice), Bill Pullman (voice), John Leguizamo (voice), Nathan Lane (voice), Drew Barrymore (voice)	United States	Animated adventure
Unbreakable	M. Night Shyamalan	Bruce Willis, Samuel L. Jackson, Robin Wright	United States	Superhero
What Planet Are You From?	Mike Nichols	Garry Shandling, Annette Bening, Greg Kinnear	United States	Comedy
X-Men	Bryan Singer	Hugh Jackman, Patrick Stewart, Ian McKellen, Halle Berry, Anna Paquin	United States	Action (Note: Won a Saturn Award for Best Science Fiction Film.)
2001
Title	Director	Cast	Country	Subgenre/notes
A.I. Artificial Intelligence	Steven Spielberg	Haley Joel Osment, Jude Law, Frances O'Connor	United States	(Note: Winner of a Saturn Award for Best Science Fiction Film.) Drama adventure
The American Astronaut	Cory McAbee	Rocco Sisto, Annie Golden	United States	Musical comedy
Atlantis: The Lost Empire	Gary Trousdale, Kirk Wise	Michael J. Fox (voice), James Garner (voice), Leonard Nimoy (voice)	United States	Animation
Avalon	Mamoru Oshii	Małgorzata Foremniak, Wladyslaw Kowalski, Jerzy Gudejko	Japan	Fantasy drama
Cowboy Bebop: The Movie	Shin'ichirō Watanabe	Kôichi Yamadera, Unshô Ishizuka, Megumi Hayashibara, Aoi Tada	Japan	Animation
Donnie Darko	Richard Kelly	Jake Gyllenhaal, Jena Malone, Drew Barrymore	United States	Psychological thriller
Electric Dragon 80.000 V	Sogo Ishii	Masatoshi Nagase	Japan	Fantasy drama
Evolution	Ivan Reitman	David Duchovny, Orlando Jones, Seann William Scott	United States	Comedy
Final	Campbell Scott	Denis Leary, Hope Davis, Maureen Anderman	United States	Drama thriller
Final Fantasy: The Spirits Within	Hironobu Sakaguchi, Motonori Sakakibara		United States	Animation
Ghosts of Mars	John Carpenter	Ice Cube, Natasha Henstridge, Jason Statham	United States	Action horror
Godzilla, Mothra and King Ghidorah: Giant Monsters All-Out Attack	Shusuke Kaneko		Japan	Kaiju
Impostor	Gary Fleder	Gary Sinise, Madeleine Stowe, Vincent D'Onofrio	United States	Action thriller
Jason X	James Isaac	Kane Hodder	United States	Slasher film
Jimmy Neutron: Boy Genius	John A. Davis		United States	Animation
Jurassic Park III	Joe Johnston	Sam Neill, William H. Macy, Téa Leoni	United States	Action adventure
K-PAX	Iain Softley	Kevin Spacey, Jeff Bridges, Mary McCormack	United States	Mystery drama
The Lost Skeleton of Cadavra	Larry Blamire	Larry Blamire, Fay Masterson, Brian Howe	United States	Comedy spoof
Metropolis	Rintaro		Japan	Anime
Mimic 2	Jean de Segonzac	Alix Koromzay, Bruno Campos, Will Estes, Jon Polito	United States	Horror
Mind Storm	Richard Pepin	Antonio Sabato Jr., Emmanuelle Vaugier, Eric Roberts	United States	Horror mystery
Nabi	Moon Seung-wook	Kim Ho-jung, Kang Hye-jung, Jang Hyun-sung	South Korea	(Note: Released theatrically in South Korea.) Psychological drama
The One	James Wong	Jet Li, Carla Gugino, Delroy Lindo	United States	Action thriller
Planet of the Apes	Tim Burton	Mark Wahlberg, Tim Roth, Helena Bonham Carter	United States	(Note: Received Razzie Award for Worst Remake or Sequel.) Action adventure
The Princess Blade	Shinsuke Sato	Hideaki Itō, Yumiko Shaku, Shiro Sano	Japan	Action
Replicant	Ringo Lam	Jean-Claude Van Damme, Michael Rooker	United States	Action thriller
Vanilla Sky	Cameron Crowe	Tom Cruise, Penélope Cruz, Cameron Diaz, Kurt Russell	United States	Psychological thriller
2002
Title	Director	Cast	Country	Subgenre/notes
28 Days Later	Danny Boyle	Cillian Murphy, Naomie Harris, Brendan Gleeson	United Kingdom	Horror
2009: Lost Memories	Lee Si-myung	Jang Dong-gun, Toru Nakamura	South Korea	Action thriller
The Adventures of Pluto Nash	Ron Underwood	Eddie Murphy, Randy Quaid, Rosario Dawson	United States	Comedy
Ballistic Ecks vs Sever	Wych Kaosayananda	Antonio Banderas, Lucy Liu, Gregg Henry, Ray Park, Talisa Soto	United States	Action thriller
Clockstoppers	Jonathan Frakes	Jesse Bradford, French Stewart	United States	Comedy
Cowboy Bebop: The Movie	Shinichiro Watanabe, Yoshiyuki Takei		Japan	Anime crime action
Cube 2: Hypercube	Andrzej Sekuła	Kari Matchett, Geraint Wyn Davies, Grace Lynn Kung	Canada	Psychological thriller, horror
Cypher	Vincenzo Natali	Jeremy Northam, Lucy Liu	United States	Thriller
Dead or Alive: Final	Takashi Miike	Show Aikawa, Riki Takeuchi	Japan	Cyberpunk
Eight Legged Freaks	Ellory Elkayem	David Arquette, Kari Wührer, Scott Terra, Doug E. Doug, Scarlett Johansson	United States	Comedy horror
Equilibrium	Kurt Wimmer	Christian Bale, Emily Watson, Taye Diggs	United States	Action
Godzilla Against Mechagodzilla	Masaaki Tezuka	Yumiko Shaku, Kana Onodera, Shin Takuma	Japan	Kaiju
Happy Here and Now	Michael Almereyda	Karl Geary, Shalom Harlow, Clarence Williams III	United States	Drama
The Last Man	Harry Ralston	David Arnott, Jeri Ryan, Dan Montgomery	United States	Post-apocalyptic comedy drama
Lilo & Stitch	Chris Sanders, Dean DeBlois	Lilo Pelekai, Chris Sanders	United States	Animated family
Men in Black II	Barry Sonnenfeld	Tommy Lee Jones, Will Smith, Lara Flynn Boyle, Rosario Dawson	United States	Action comedy
Minority Report	Steven Spielberg	Tom Cruise, Colin Farrell, Samantha Morton, Max von Sydow	United States	(Note: Won a Saturn Award for Best Science Fiction Film.) Action mystery
Project Viper	Jay Andrews	Theresa Russell, Patrick Muldoon, Tim Thomerson	United States	Action horror
Reign of Fire	Rob Bowman	Christian Bale, Matthew McConaughey, Izabella Scorupco	United States	Action
Resident Evil	Paul W. S. Anderson	Milla Jovovich, Michelle Rodriguez, Eric Mabius	United States	Action horror
Returner	Takashi Yamazaki	Takeshi Kaneshiro, Anne Suzuki, Kirin Kiki	Japan	Action adventure
Rollerball	John McTiernan	Chris Klein, Jean Reno, LL Cool J	United States	Action
Science Fiction	Danny Deprez	Wendy Van Dijk, Koen De Bouw, Liesbeth Kamerling	Netherlands	Family adventure
Scorcher	James Seale	Mark Dacascos, John Rhys-Davies, Tamara Davies, Mark Rolston, Rutger Hauer	United States	Action adventure
Signs	M. Night Shyamalan	Mel Gibson, Joaquin Phoenix, Cherry Jones	United States	Thriller
Simone	Andrew Niccol	Al Pacino, Catherine Keener, Pruitt Taylor Vince, Jay Mohr, Winona Ryder	United States	Comedy
So Close	Corey Yuen	Shu Qi, Zhao Wei, Karen Mok	United Kingdom; Hong Kong	Action
Solaris	Steven Soderbergh	George Clooney, Natascha McElhone, Jeremy Davies	United States	Psychological drama
Spider-Man	Sam Raimi	Tobey Maguire, Willem Dafoe, Kirsten Dunst	United States	Fantasy action adventure (Note: Won a Saturn Award for Best Music. Highest-grossing film of 2002.)
Star Trek: Nemesis	Stuart Baird	Patrick Stewart, Jonathan Frakes, Brent Spiner, LeVar Burton, Ron Perlman, Tom Hardy, Dina Meyer	United States	Action thriller
Star Wars: Episode II – Attack of the Clones	George Lucas	Ewan McGregor, Hayden Christensen, Natalie Portman, Ian McDiarmid, Frank Oz, Samuel L. Jackson, Christopher Lee	United States	(Note: Won Saturn Awards for Best Costumes and Best Special Effects. Received Razzie Awards for Worst Screenplay and Worst Supporting Actor.) Space opera
Tamala 2010: A Punk Cat in Space	t. o. L.		Japan	Anime
Teknolust	Lynn Hershman Leeson	Tilda Swinton, Jeremy Davies, James Urbaniak	United States	Drama
The Time Machine	Simon Wells	Guy Pearce, Samantha Mumba, Mark Addy, Orlando Jones, Jeremy Irons	United States	Time travel
Timequest	Robert Dyke	Caprice Benedetti, Bruce Campbell, Vince Grant, Victor Slezak	United States	Time travel
Trancers 6	Jay Woelfel	Zette Sullivan, Timothy Prindle	United States	
Treasure Planet	Ron Clements, John Musker	Joseph Gordon-Levitt (voice), Emma Thompson (voice), Brian Murray (voice)	United States	Animated family adventure
2003
Title	Director	Cast	Country	Subgenre/notes
Absolon	David Barto	Christopher Lambert, Kelly Brook, Lou Diamond Phillips, Ron Perlman	United Kingdom	Action thriller
Alien Hunter	Ron Krauss	James Spader, Leslie Stefanson, Carl Lewis	United States; Bulgaria	Action thriller
Beyond Re-Animator	Brian Yuzna	Jeffrey Combs, Jason Barry, Elsa Pataky	United States	Sci-fi horror
The Big Empty	Steve Anderson	Jon Favreau, Joey Lauren Adams, Kelsey Grammer	United States	Mystery comedy
Code 46	Michael Winterbottom	Tim Robbins, Samantha Morton, Jeanne Balibar	United Kingdom	Romance
The Core	Jon Amiel	Aaron Eckhart, Hilary Swank, Delroy Lindo	United States	Disaster film
Dragon Head	Jôji Iida	Satoshi Tsumabuki, Sayaka Kanda, Takayuki Yamada	Japan	Mystery drama
Dreamcatcher	Lawrence Kasdan	Morgan Freeman, Thomas Jane, Jason Lee	United States	Horror drama
Godzilla: Tokyo SOS	Masaaki Tezuka	Noboru Kaneko, Miho Yoshioka, Katsuya Onizuka	Japan	Giant monster film
Good Boy!	John Hoffman	Molly Shannon, Liam Aiken, Kevin Nealon	United States	Family comedy drama
Hulk	Ang Lee	Eric Bana, Jennifer Connelly, Sam Elliott, Josh Lucas, Nick Nolte	United States	Superhero
Interstella 5555: The 5tory of the 5ecret 5tar 5ystem	Kazuhisa Takenouchi		France; Japan	Anime
It's All About Love	Thomas Vinterberg	Joaquin Phoenix, Claire Danes, Sean Penn	United States; Denmark	Apocalyptic
Koi... Mil Gaya	Rakesh Roshan	Hrithik Roshan, Preity Zinta, Rekha	India	Hindi film; fantasy drama
The Matrix Reloaded	The Wachowskis (Note: Credited as "The Wachowski Brothers".)	Keanu Reeves, Carrie-Anne Moss, Laurence Fishburne	United States	Action adventure
The Matrix Revolutions	The Wachowskis (Note: Credited as "The Wachowski Brothers".)	Keanu Reeves, Carrie-Anne Moss, Laurence Fishburne	United States	Action adventure
Mimic 3: Sentinel	J. T. Petty	Karl Geary, Alexis Dziena, Rebecca Mader, Lance Henriksen	United States	Horror
Moon Child	Takahisa Zeze	Gackt Camui, Hyde Takarai, Leehom Wang	Japan	Action drama
Natural City	Min Byeong-cheon	Yoo Ji-tae, Yoon Chan, Seo Rin	South Korea	Action drama
Paycheck	John Woo	Ben Affleck, Aaron Eckhart, Uma Thurman	United States	(Note: Received a Razzie Award for Worst Actor.) Action thriller
Robot Stories	Greg Pak	Tamlyn Tomita, James Saito, Wai Ching Ho	United States	Indie drama
Save the Green Planet!	Jang Joon-hwan	Shin Ha-kyun, Baek Yoon-sik	South Korea	Comedy horror thriller
Terminator 3: Rise of the Machines	Jonathan Mostow	Arnold Schwarzenegger, Nick Stahl, Claire Danes, Kristanna Loken	United States	Action
Timeline	Richard Donner	Paul Walker, Frances O'Connor, Gerard Butler	United States	Fantasy
Undead	Michael Spierig, Peter Spierig	Felicity Mason, Mungo McKay, Rob Jenkins	Australia	Zombie horror comedy
Wonderful Days	Sunmin Park, Kim Moon-saeng		South Korea	Animation
WXIII: Patlabor the Movie 3	Fumihiko Takayama		Japan	Anime
X2	Bryan Singer	Patrick Stewart, Hugh Jackman, Ian McKellen, Halle Berry, Anna Paquin	United States	(Note: Winner of a Saturn Award for Best Science Fiction Film.) Superhero
2004
Title	Director	Cast	Country	Subgenre/notes
2046	Wong Kar-wai	Tony Leung Chiu-Wai, Gong Li, Takuya Kimura	Hong Kong	Romantic drama
After the Apocalypse	Yasuaki Nakajima		Japan	Drama
Alien vs. Predator	Paul W. S. Anderson	Sanaa Lathan, Raoul Bova, Lance Henriksen	United States	Action thriller
Appleseed	Shinji Aramaki		Japan	Anime
The Butterfly Effect	Eric Bress, J. Mackye Gruber	Ashton Kutcher, Amy Smart	United States	Psychological thriller
Casshern	Kiriya Kazuaki	Yusuke Iseya, Kumiko Asō, Toshiaki Karasawa	Japan	Action
The Chronicles of Riddick	David N. Twohy	Vin Diesel, Colm Feore, Thandie Newton	United States	Action adventure
Cube Zero	Ernie Barbarash	Zachary Bennett, Michael Riley	Canada	Horror
The Day After Tomorrow	Roland Emmerich	Dennis Quaid, Jake Gyllenhaal, Ian Holm, Emmy Rossum, Sela Ward	United States	Disaster film
Dead Leaves	Hiroyuki Imaishi		Japan	Anime
Decoys	Matthew Hastings	Meghan Ory, Kim Poirier, Enis Esmer	Canada	Horror
District 13	Pierre Morel	David Belle, Cyril Raffaelli, Dany Verissimo	France	Action
Eternal Sunshine of the Spotless Mind	Michel Gondry	Jim Carrey, Kate Winslet, Kirsten Dunst, Mark Ruffalo, Elijah Wood	United States	Romantic comedy (Note: Won an Oscar for best original screenplay and a Saturn Award for Best Science Fiction Film.)
FAQ: Frequently Asked Questions	Carlos Atanes	Xavier Tort, Anne Celine Auche	Spain	Dystopia
The Final Cut	Omar Naim	Robin Williams, Mira Sorvino, James Caviezel	United States	Thriller
The Forgotten	Joseph Ruben	Julianne Moore, Dominic West, Gary Sinise	United States	Psychological thriller
Ghost in the Shell 2: Innocence	Mamoru Oshii	Akio Ôtsuka, Atsuko Tanaka, Kôichi Yamadera,	Japan	Anime
Godsend	Nick Hamm	Greg Kinnear, Rebecca Romijn, Cameron Bright, Robert De Niro	United States; Canada	Horror
Godzilla: Final Wars	Ryuhei Kitamura	Masahiro Matsuoka, Rei Kikukawa	Japan	Kaiju
G.O.R.A.	Ömer Faruk Sorak	Cem Yılmaz, Özge Özberk, Şafak Sezer	Turkey	Comedy
I, Robot	Alex Proyas	Will Smith, Bridget Moynahan, Alan Tudyk	United States	Action mystery
Immortel (ad vitam)	Enki Bilal	Charlotte Rampling, Thomas Kretschmann, Linda Hardy	France	Crime
Night Watch	Timur Bekmambetov	Konstantin Khabensky, Vladimir Menshov, Valery Zolotukhin	Russia	Horror
Paranoia 1.0	Jeff Renfroe, Marteinn Thorsson	Jeremy Sisto, Deborah Kara Unger, Bruce Payne	United States; Romania; Iceland	Cyberpunk
Phil the Alien	Rob Stefaniuk	Rob Stefaniuk, Nicole de Boer, Graham Greene	Canada	Comedy
The Place Promised in Our Early Days	Makoto Shinkai		Japan	Anime
Post Impact	Christoph Schrewe	Dean Cain, Bettina Zimmermann, Adrienne McQueen	Germany; United States	Post-impact
Primer	Shane Carruth	Shane Carruth, David Sullivan	United States	Drama (Note: Winner of the Dramatic Grand Jury Prize at the Sundance Film Festival and the Alfred P. Sloan Prize.)
Resident Evil: Apocalypse	Alexander Witt	Milla Jovovich, Sienna Guillory, Oded Fehr	United States	Action horror
Six: The Mark Unleashed	Kevin Downes	Stephen Baldwin, Eric Roberts	United States	Action drama
Sky Captain and the World of Tomorrow	Kerry Conran	Gwyneth Paltrow, Jude Law, Angelina Jolie	United States	Pulp adventure
Spider-Man 2	Sam Raimi	Tobey Maguire, Kirsten Dunst, James Franco	United States	Superhero
Starship Troopers 2: Hero of the Federation	Phil Tippett	Billy Brown, Richard Burgi, Kelly Carlson, Cy Carter	United States	Action adventure horror
The Stepford Wives	Frank Oz	Nicole Kidman, Matthew Broderick, Bette Midler, Christopher Walken	United States	Black comedy
Thunderbirds	Jonathan Frakes	Bill Paxton, Anthony Edwards, Sophia Myles, Ben Kingsley	United States	Adventure
2005
Title	Director	Cast	Country	Subgenre/notes
Alien Abduction	Eric Forsberg	Megan Lee Ethridge, Griff Furst, Marissa Morse	United States	Horror
Allegro	Christoffer Boe	Ulrich Thomsen, Helena Christensen, Henning Moritzen	Denmark	Romantic drama
The Cave	Bruce Hunt	Cole Hauser, Morris Chestnut, Eddie Cibrian	United States	Horror
Chicken Little	Mark Dindal		United States	Animated family comedy
The Dark Hours	Paul Fox	Kate Greenhouse, Aidan Devine, Gordon Currie	Canada	Psychological thriller
Doom	Andrzej Bartkowiak	Karl Urban, Rosamund Pike, Razaaq Adoti	Czech Republic; Germany; United Kingdom; United States	Horror
Evil Aliens	Jake West	Emily Booth, Christopher Adamson, Norman Lovett	United Kingdom	Horror comedy
Fantastic Four	Tim Story	Ioan Gruffudd, Jessica Alba, Chris Evans, Michael Chiklis	United States	Superhero
Final Fantasy VII Advent Children	Tetsuya Nomura, Takeshi Nozue		Japan	Animation
The Girl from Monday	Hal Hartley	Bill Sage, Sabrina Lloyd, Tatiana Abracos	United States	Comedy
H.G. Wells' The War of the Worlds	Timothy Hines		United States	Action drama
Headspace	Andrew van den Houten	Olivia Hussey, William Atherton, Sean Young	United States	Horror mystery
The Hitchhiker's Guide to the Galaxy	Garth Jennings	Martin Freeman, Mos Def, Sam Rockwell	United States; United Kingdom	Comedy
The Island	Michael Bay	Ewan McGregor, Scarlett Johansson, Sean Bean	United States	Thriller
The Jacket	John Maybury	Adrien Brody, Keira Knightley, Kris Kristofferson, Jennifer Jason Leigh	United States	Psychological thriller
Man with the Screaming Brain	Bruce Campbell	Bruce Campbell, Ted Raimi	United States	Slapstick
Meatball Machine	Yūdai Yamaguchi, Junichi Yamamoto	Issei Takahashi, Aoba Kawai	Japan	Horror
Puzzlehead	James Bai	Stephen Galaida, Robbie Shapiro	United States	Drama
Robots	Chris Wedge, Carlos Saldanha		United States	Animation
Serenity	Joss Whedon	Nathan Fillion, Gina Torres, Alan Tudyk	United States	(Note: Won a Saturn Award for Best Supporting Actress, a Nebula Award for Best Script and a Hugo Award for Best Dramatic Presentation, Long Form.) Space adventure
Slipstream	David Van Eyssen	Vinnie Jones, Sean Astin	United States	Time travel
A Sound of Thunder	Peter Hyams	Edward Burns, Catherine McCormack, Ben Kingsley	United States	Time travel adventure
Star Wars: Episode III – Revenge of the Sith	George Lucas	Ewan McGregor, Hayden Christensen, Natalie Portman, Ian McDiarmid, Frank Oz, Samuel L. Jackson, Christopher Lee	United States	(Note: Received a Razzie Award for Worst Supporting Actor. Won Saturn Awards for Best Science Fiction Film and Best Music. Highest grossing film of 2005.) Space opera
Stealth	Rob Cohen	Josh Lucas, Jessica Biel, Jamie Foxx, Sam Shepard	United States	Action
Steamboy	Katsuhiro Otomo		Japan	Anime
Wallace & Gromit: The Curse of the Were-Rabbit	Steve Box, Nick Park	Peter Sallis, Ralph Fiennes, Helena Bonham Carter, Peter Kay, Nicholas Smith and Liz Smith	United Kingdom	Stop-motion
War of the Worlds	Steven Spielberg	Tom Cruise, Dakota Fanning, Miranda Otto, Tim Robbins, Morgan Freeman	United States	Alien invasion
The Wild Blue Yonder	Werner Herzog	Brad Dourif	United Kingdom; France; Germany	Documentary mashup
Zathura: A Space Adventure	Jon Favreau	Jonah Bobo, Josh Hutcherson, Dax Shepard	United States	Fantasy adventure
2006
Title	Director	Cast	Country	Subgenre/notes
Aachi & Ssipak	Joe Bum-Jim		South Korea	Animation
Alien Autopsy	Jonny Campbell	Ant McPartlin, Declan Donnelly, Bill Pullman	Germany; United Kingdom	Comedy
Altered	Eduardo Sanchez	Paul McCarthy Boyington, James Gammon, Brad William Henke	United States	Horror
Aziris Nuna	Oleg Kompasov	Aleksandr Filippenko	Russia	Action adventure
Children of Men	Alfonso Cuarón	Clive Owen, Julianne Moore, Michael Caine	United States	(Note: Winner of BAFTA Awards for Best Cinematography and Best Art Direction. Won a Saturn award for Best Science Fiction Film.) Adventure drama
The Cloud	Gregor Schnitzler	Paula Kalenberg, Franz Dinda, Hans-Laurin Beyerling	Germany	German title: Die Wolke. Drama thriller.
Daft Punk's Electroma	Daft Punk	Peter Hurteau, Michael Reich	United States; France	Drama
The Dark Hour	Elio Quiroga	Silke Hornillos Klein, Omar Muñoz, Pepo Oliva	Spain	Horror mystery
Day Watch	Timur Bekmambetov	Konstantin Khabensky, Maria Poroshina, Vladimir Menshov	Russia	Action fantasy
Dead and Deader	Patrick Dinhut	Dean Cain, Guy Torry, Susan Ward	United States	Action horror comedy
Déjà Vu	Tony Scott	Denzel Washington, Paula Patton, Val Kilmer	United States	Action crime-thriller
Displaced	Martin Holland	Mark Strange, Malcolm Hankey, Stephanie Fend	United Kingdom	Action adventure
The Fountain	Darren Aronofsky	Hugh Jackman, Rachel Weisz	United States	Romantic drama
Gamera the Brave	Ryuta Tasaki	Ryo Tomioka, Kanji Tsuda, Kaho	Japan	Kaiju
The Girl Who Leapt Through Time	Mamoru Hosoda	Riisa Naka (voice), Takuya Ishida (voice), Mitsutaka Itakura (voice)	Japan	Anime
The Host	Bong Joon-ho	Song Kang-ho, Byun Hee-bong, Park Hae-il	South Korea	Monster
Idiocracy	Mike Judge	Luke Wilson, Maya Rudolph, Dax Shepard	United States	Satirical comedy
Japan Sinks	Shinji Higuchi	Tsuyoshi Kusanagi, Kou Shibasaki, Etsushi Toyokawa	Japan	Japanese title: Nihon Chinbotsu. Adventure drama.
The Kovak Box	Daniel Monzón	Timothy Hutton, Lucía Jiménez, Annette Badland	Spain; United Kingdom	Mystery thriller
Krrish	Rakesh Roshan	Hrithik Roshan, Priyanka Chopra, Naseeruddin Shah, Rekha	India	Hindi superhero film
Lifted	Gary Rydstrom		United States	Animation
Paprika	Satoshi Kon		Japan	Anime
The Prestige	Christopher Nolan	Christian Bale, Hugh Jackman, Scarlett Johansson, Michael Caine	United Kingdom United States	
Renaissance	Christian Volckman		France	Animation
Right at Your Door	Chris Gorak	Mary McCormack, Rory Cochrane, Scotty Noyd, Max Kasch, Will McCormack	English	Drama thriller
S.S. Doomtrooper	David Flores	Corin Nemec, Ben Cross, James Pomitcher	United States	Television film
A Scanner Darkly	Richard Linklater	Keanu Reeves (voice), Robert Downey Jr. (voice), Woody Harrelson (voice)	United States	Animation crime-drama
Slither	James Gunn	Nathan Fillion, Elizabeth Banks, Gregg Henry	United States	(Note: Winner of a Saturn award for Best Make-up.) Horror comedy
Southland Tales	Richard Kelly	Dwayne Johnson, Justin Timberlake, Sarah Michelle Gellar, Mandy Moore	United States	Dark comedy drama
Superman Returns	Bryan Singer	Brandon Routh, Kate Bosworth, James Marsden, Kevin Spacey, Parker Posey	United States	Superhero
Ultimate Avengers - The Movie	Curt Geda, Steven E. Gordon	Justin Gross, Grey Griffin, Michael Massee	United States	Animated film
The Ugly Swans	Konstantin Lopushansky	Catherine Dussart, Gregory Hlady	Russia; France	Thriller
Ultraviolet	Kurt Wimmer	Milla Jovovich, Cameron Bright	United States	Action
Unidentified	Rich Christiano	Jonathan Aube, Josh Adamson, Rebecca St. James	United States	Supernatural
V for Vendetta	James McTeigue	Natalie Portman, Hugo Weaving	United States	(Note: Natalie Portman won a Saturn award for Best Actress.) Dystopian thriller
Wrestlemaniac	Jesse Baget	Rey Misterio Sr., Irwin Keyes, Leyla Milani	United States	Horror
X-Men: The Last Stand	Brett Ratner	Hugh Jackman, Halle Berry, Ian McKellen, Anna Paquin, Patrick Stewart	United States; United Kingdom	(Note: Winner of a Saturn award for Best Supporting Actress.) Superhero
Zerophilia	Martin Curland	Taylor Handley, Dustin Seavey	United States	Romantic comedy
2007
Title	Director	Cast	Country	Subgenre/notes
28 Weeks Later	Juan Carlos Fresnadillo	Robert Carlyle, Rose Byrne, Jeremy Renner	Spain; United States; United Kingdom	Post-apocalyptic horror
Aliens vs. Predator: Requiem	Greg Strause, Colin Strause	Reiko Aylesworth, Steven Pasquale, Shareeka Epps	United States	Action horror
Appleseed Ex Machina	Shinji Aramaki		Japan	Anime
Big Man Japan	Hitoshi Matsumoto	Hitoshi Matsumoto, Riki Takeuchi, Ua	Japan	Comedy
Chrysalis	Julien Leclercq	Albert Dupontel, Estelle Lefébure, Marie Guillard	France	Crime drama
Decaying Orbit	Tim Pyle	Darren Schnase, Osa Wallander, Denise Gossett	United States	Action
Eden Log	Franck Vestiel	Clovis Cornillac, Vimala Pons,	France	Horror mystery
Evangelion: 1.0 You Are (Not) Alone	Hideaki Anno	Megumi Ogata (voice), Megumi Hayashibara (voice), Kotono Mitsuishi (voice)	Japan	Anime
Fantastic Four: Rise of the Silver Surfer	Tim Story	Ioan Gruffudd, Jessica Alba, Chris Evans, Michael Chiklis	United States	Action adventure
Flatland	Ladd Ehlinger Jr.		United States	Animation
I Am Legend	Francis Lawrence	Will Smith, Alice Braga, Salli Richardson-Whitfield	United States	(Note: Will Smith won a Saturn Award for Best Actor.) Post-apocalyptic thriller
Illegal Aliens	David Giancola	Joanie "Chyna" Laurer, Anna Nicole Smith, Dennis Lemoine	United States	Comedy
The Invasion	Oliver Hirschbiegel	Nicole Kidman, Daniel Craig, Jeremy Northam	United States	Thriller
The Last Mimzy	Bob Shaye	Chris O'Neil, Rhiannon Leigh Wryn, Timothy Hutton	United States	Family adventure
The Last Sentinel	Jesse V. Johnson	Don Wilson, Katee Sackhoff, Peter Allas	United States	Action
The Man from Earth		John Billingsley	United States	Drama
Meet the Robinsons	Stephen Anderson		United States	Animation
The Mist	Frank Darabont	Thomas Jane, Marcia Gay Harden	United States	Horror
Next	Lee Tamahori	Nicolas Cage, Julianne Moore, Jessica Biel	United States	Action thriller
Paragraf 78, Punkt 1	Mikhail Khleborodov		Russia	Action thriller
Proxima	Carlos Atanes	Oriol Aubets, Anthony Blake, Arantxa Peña	Spain	Underground
Resident Evil: Extinction	Russell Mulcahy	Milla Jovovich, Oded Fehr, Ali Larter	United States	Action horror
Sex and Death 101	Daniel Waters	Simon Baker, Winona Ryder, Leslie Bibb, Patton Oswalt	United States	Dark comedy
Spider-Man 3	Sam Raimi	Tobey Maguire, Kirsten Dunst, James Franco	United States	Superhero
Sunshine	Danny Boyle	Cillian Murphy, Chris Evans, Rose Byrne	United States; United Kingdom	Thriller
Superman: Doomsday	Bruce Timm, Lauren Montgomery, Brandon Vietti	Adam Baldwin, Anne Heche, James Marsters	United States	Animated superhero film
Timecrimes	Nacho Vigalondo	Karra Elejalde, Barbara Goenaga, Nacho Vigalondo	Spain	Time-travel mystery
TMNT	Kevin Munroe	Chris Evans (voice), Sarah Michelle Gellar (voice), Patrick Stewart (voice), Mako (voice)	United States; Hong Kong	Animation
Transformers	Michael Bay	Shia LaBeouf, Megan Fox, Josh Duhamel, Tyrese Gibson	United States	Action thriller
Underdog	Frederik Du Chau	Jason Lee (voice), Peter Dinklage (voice), James Belushi (voice)	United States	Animation
Vexille	Fumihiko Sori		United States	Anime
2008
Title	Director	Cast	Country	Subgenre/notes
2012: Doomsday	Nick Everhart	Cliff DeYoung, Dale Midkiff, Ami Dolenz, Sara Tomko, Caroline Amiguet	United States	Christian action disaster
20th Century Boys	Yukihiko Tsutsumi	Toshiaki Karasawa, Etsushi Toyokawa, Takako Tokiwa	Japan	
Alien Raiders	Ben Rock	Carlos Bernard, Mathew St. Patrick, Courtney Ford, Rockmond Dunbar	United States	Horror
Babylon A.D.	Mathieu Kassovitz	Vin Diesel, Michelle Yeoh	France; United States	Action adventure
Blindness	Fernando Meirelles	Julianne Moore, Mark Ruffalo, Danny Glover	United States	Psychological thriller
City of Ember	Gil Kenan	Saoirse Ronan, Harry Treadaway, Bill Murray, Mackenzie Crook,	United States	Fantasy adventure
CJ7	Stephen Chow	Stephen Chow, Kitty Zhang Yuqi	Hong Kong	Comedy
The Clone Returns Home	Kanji Nakajima	Mitsuhiro Oikawa, Eri Ishida, Hiromi Nagasaku, Kyûsaku Shimada	Japan	
Cloverfield	Matt Reeves	Michael Stahl-David, Mike Vogel, Odette Yustman	United States	Monster movie (Note: Won a Saturn Award for Best Science Fiction Film.)
Cyborg Soldier	John Stead	Rich Franklin, Tiffani Thiessen, Bruce Greenwood	United States	
Dance of the Dead	Gregg Bishop	Jared Kusnitz, Grayson Chadwick, Chandler Darby	United States	Horror comedy
Dante 01	Marc Caro	Lambert Wilson, Dominique Pinon	France	Thriller
Dasavathaaram	K.S.Ravikumar	Kamal Haasan, Asin Thottumkal	India	Action disaster
The Day the Earth Stood Still	Scott Derrickson	Keanu Reeves, Jennifer Connelly, Kathy Bates	United States	Drama thriller (Note: Jaden Christopher Smith won the Saturn Award for Best Performance by a Young Actor.)
Death Race	Paul W. S. Anderson	Jason Statham, Joan Allen, Ian McShane	United States	Action
Doomsday	Neil Marshall	Rhona Mitra, Bob Hoskins, Malcolm McDowell	United Kingdom	Action thriller
Far Cry	Uwe Boll	Til Schweiger, Emmanuelle Vaugier, Craig Fairbrass	Canada	Action adventure
Franklyn	Gerald McMorrow	Ryan Phillippe, Eva Green, Sam Riley	United Kingdom	Fantasy drama
Ghost in the Shell 2.0	Mamoru Oshii	Atsuko Tanaka (voice), Akio Otsuka (voice), Kôichi Yamadera (voice), Tesshô Genda (voice)	Japan	
The Happening	M. Night Shyamalan	Mark Wahlberg, Zooey Deschanel, John Leguizamo	United States	Thriller
The Incredible Hulk	Louis Leterrier	Edward Norton, Liv Tyler, Tim Roth, William Hurt	United States	Superhero
The Inhabited Island	Fyodor Bondarchuk	Fyodor Bondarchuk, Pyotr Fyodorov, Aleksei Serebryakov	Russia	Action adventure
Iron Man	Jon Favreau	Robert Downey Jr., Terrence Howard, Gwyneth Paltrow, Jeff Bridges	United States	Superhero (Note: Won the Saturn Award for Best Science Fiction Film. Robert Downey Jr. won the Saturn Award for best actor and Jon Favreau for best direction. Robert Downey Jr. won a Constellation Award for Best Male Performance in a 2008 Science Fiction Film, TV Movie, or Mini-Series. Second highest grossing film of 2008.)
Jumper	Doug Liman	Hayden Christensen, Samuel L. Jackson, Rachel Bilson	United States	Action adventure
Justice League: The New Frontier	Dave Bullock	David Boreanaz, Miguel Ferrer, Neal Patrick Harris	United States	Animated superhero film
Love Story 2050	Harry Baweja	Priyanka Chopra, Harman Baweja	India	Action drama
Meet Dave	Brian Robbins	Eddie Murphy, Gabrielle Union, Ed Helms	United States	Family comedy
The Mutant Chronicles	Simon Hunter	Thomas Jane, Ron Perlman, Devon Aoki	United States	Action horror
Next Avengers: Heroes of Tomorrow	Jay Oliva	Noah Crawford, Brenna O'Brien, Aidan Drummond, Dempsey Pappion (all voice)	United States	Adventure action family animation
Outlander	Howard McCain	James Caviezel, Jack Huston, Sophia Myles	United States	Action adventure
Repo! The Genetic Opera	Darren Lynn Bousman	Alexa Vega, Anthony Stewart Head, Paris Hilton	United States	Musical film
Resident Evil: Degeneration	Makoto Kamiya	Paul Mercier, Alyson Court, Laura Bailey, Roger Craig Smith	Japan	Animation action horror thriller
Sleep Dealer	Alex Rivera	Luis Fernando Peña, Leonor Varela, Jacob Vargas	Mexico; United States	Cyberpunk
Star Wars: The Clone Wars	Dave Filoni	Matt Lanter (voice), James Arnold Taylor (voice), Ashley Eckstein (voice)	United States	Animation
Starship Troopers 3: Marauder	Edward Neumeier	Casper Van Dien, Jolene Blalock, Stephen Hogan, Boris Kodjoe	United States South Africa Germany	Action adventure
Tokyo Gore Police	Yoshihiro Nishimura	Eihi Shiina, Itsuji Itao, Yukihide Benny	United States; Japan	Gore
WALL-E	Andrew Stanton	Ben Burtt (voice), Elissa Knight (voice), Jeff Garlin (voice)	United States	Animation (Note: It received 6 Oscar nominations and won an Oscar for best animated feature. It won the 2009 Hugo Award for Best Dramatic Presentation, Long Form. It won the 2008 Producers Guild of America award for best animated picture. It received the Constellation Award for Best Science Fiction Film, TV Movie, or Mini-Series of 2008.)
The X-Files: I Want to Believe	Chris Carter	David Duchovny, Gillian Anderson, Amanda Peet	United States	Thriller
Zombie Strippers	Jay Lee	Robert Englund, Jenna Jameson, Penny Drake	United States	Horror comedy
2009
Title	Director	Cast	Country	Subgenre/notes
20th Century Boys 2: The Last Hope	Yukihiko Tsutsumi	Toshiaki Karasawa, Etsushi Toyokawa, Takako Tokiwa	Japan	
20th Century Boys 3: Redemption	Yukihiko Tsutsumi	Naoto Takenaka, Teruyuki Kagawa, Takako Tokiwa	Japan	
2012	Roland Emmerich	John Cusack, Amanda Peet, Danny Glover, Woody Harrelson	United States	Disaster
9	Shane Acker	Elijah Wood (voice), Jennifer Connelly (voice), Christopher Plummer (voice)	United States	Animation
Alien Trespass	R. W. Goodwin	Eric McCormack, Jenni Baird, Robert Patrick	United States	Comedy
Astroboy	David Bowers	Nicolas Cage (voice), Donald Sutherland (voice), Freddie Highmore (voice)	Hong Kong; United States	Animated
Avatar	James Cameron	Sam Worthington, Zoe Saldaña, Sigourney Weaver, Stephen Lang	United States	Action adventure (Note: Highest-grossing film of 2009. It won 2010 BAFTA awards for Production Design and Special Visual Effects. Winner of Academy Awards for Art Direction, Cinematography and Visual Effects.)
Battle for Terra	Keith Calder	Brian Cox (voice), James Garner (voice), Evan Rachel Wood (voice)	United States	Animated action
The Box	Richard Kelly	Cameron Diaz, James Marsden, Frank Langella	United States	Psychological horror
Cargo	Ivan Engler, Ralph Etter	Anna-Katharina Schwabroh, Martin Rapold	Switzerland	Mystery thriller
Cloudy with a Chance of Meatballs	Phil Lord, Christopher Miller	Bill Hader, Anna Faris	United States	Animated comedy
District 9	Neill Blomkamp	Sharlto Copley, Jason Cope, David James	United States; New Zealand; South Africa	Thriller
Dragonball Evolution	James Wong	Justin Chatwin, Chow Yun-fat, Emmy Rossum	United States	Science fantasy, action adventure
Evangelion: 2.0 You Can (Not) Advance	Kazuya Tsurumaki, Hideaki Anno, Masayuki	Megumi Ogata (voice), Megumi Hayashibara (voice), Yūko Miyamura (voice)	Japan	Anime, mecha
Frequently Asked Questions About Time Travel	Gareth Carrivick	Chris O'Dowd, Marc Wootton, Anna Faris	United Kingdom	Comedy
G.I. Joe: The Rise of Cobra	Stephen Sommers	Channing Tatum, Marlon Wayans, Lee Byung-hun, Sienna Miller, Rachel Nichols, Dennis Quaid	United States	Action
Gamer	Mark Neveldine, Brian Taylor	Gerard Butler, Michael C. Hall	United States	Thriller
Green Lantern: First Flight	Lauren Montgomery	Christopher Meloni, Victor Garber, Tricia Helfer, Michael Madsen	United States	Animated superhero film
Hulk vs	Frank Paur	Fred Tatasciore (voice), Matthew Wolf (voice), Graham McTavish (voice), Grey Griffin (voice)	United States	Fantasy action animation
Kenny Begins	Carl Åstrand, Mats Lindberg	Johan Rheborg, Bill Skarsgård	Sweden	Comedy
Knowing	Alex Proyas	Nicolas Cage, Rose Byrne, Chandler Canterbury	United States	Disaster thriller
Land of the Lost	Brad Silberling	Will Ferrell, Anna Friel, Danny McBride	United States	Comedy (Note: Razzie award for Worst Prequel, Remake, Rip-off or Sequel of 2009.)
Metropia	Tarik Saleh	Vincent Gallo (voice), Juliette Lewis (voice), Udo Kier (voice)	Sweden	Animation
Mock-Up on Mu	Craig Baldwin	Stoney Burke, Jeri Lynn Cohen, David Cox, Ed Holmes, Damon Packard	United States	Comedy
Monsters vs. Aliens	Conrad Vernon, Rob Letterman	Reese Witherspoon (voice), Hugh Laurie (voice), Kiefer Sutherland (voice), Stephen Colbert (voice)	United States	Animated comedy
Moon	Duncan Jones	Sam Rockwell, Kevin Spacey	United Kingdom	Drama (Note: British Independent Film Awards (BIFA) winner of the 2009 award for the Best British Independent Film. Director Duncan Jones was also awarded the BIFA Douglas Hickox Award. In 2010, he won the BAFTA award for Outstanding Debut by a British Writer, Director or Producer for his work on Moon.)
Mr. Nobody	Jaco Van Dormael	Jared Leto, Diane Kruger, Sarah Polley	Belgium; Canada; France; Germany	Fantasy drama (Note: Received Magritte Awards for Best Film, Best Director, Best Screenplay, Best Cinematography, Best Original Score and Best Editing.)
Pandorum	Christian Alvart	Dennis Quaid, Ben Foster, Cam Gigandet	United States; Germany	Action thriller
Planet 51	Jorge Blanco	Dwayne Johnson (voice), Justin Long (voice), Jessica Biel (voice)	Spain; United States	Animation
Push	Paul McGuigan	Chris Evans, Dakota Fanning, Camilla Belle, Djimon Hounsou	United States; Hong Kong	Action thriller
Race to Witch Mountain	Andy Fickman	Dwayne Johnson, Carla Gugino, AnnaSophia Robb	United States	Adventure
Redline	Takeshi Koike	Takuya Kimura (voice), Yū Aoi (voice), Tadanobu Asano (voice)	Japan	Anime
Robo-geisha	Noboru Iguchi		Japan	Action
Screamers: The Hunting	Sheldon Wilson	Gina Holden, Jana Pallaske, Lance Henriksen	United States	Horror
Space Battleship Yamato: Resurrection			Japan	Anime
Splice	Vincenzo Natali	Adrien Brody, Sarah Polley, David Hewlett	Canada; United States	Horror
Star Trek	J. J. Abrams	Chris Pine, Eric Bana, Zachary Quinto, Zoe Saldaña, Karl Urban, Simon Pegg, Winona Ryder, Leonard Nimoy	United States	Action adventure (Note: Winner of an Academy Award for Makeup.)
Stingray Sam	Cory McAbee	Cory McAbee, Joshua Taylor	United States	Musical western comedy
Superman/Batman: Public Enemies	Sam Liu	Kevin Conroy, Tim Daly, Clancy Brown	United States	Animated superhero film
Surrogates	Jonathan Mostow	Bruce Willis, Radha Mitchell	United States	Action
Terminator Salvation	McG	Christian Bale, Sam Worthington	United States	Action
Tetsuo: The Bullet Man	Shinya Tsukamoto	Eric Bossick, Akiko Monō, Shinya Tsukamoto	Japan	Cyberpunk action
The Time Traveler's Wife	Robert Schwentke	Eric Bana, Rachel McAdams, Ron Livingston	United States	Time travel mystery drama
Transformers: Revenge of the Fallen	Michael Bay	Shia LaBeouf, Megan Fox, Josh Duhamel, Tyrese Gibson	United States	Action thriller (Note: Razzie awards for Worst Picture, Worst Director and Worst Screenplay of 2009.)
Watchmen	Zack Snyder	Jackie Earle Haley, Patrick Wilson, Carla Gugino	United States	Superhero
Wonder Woman	Lauren Montgomery	Keri Russell, Nathan Fillion, Alfred Molina, Rosario Dawson	United States	Animation action adventure fantasy
Zone of the Dead	Milan Konjević, Milan Todorović	Ken Foree, Kristina Klebe, Emilio Roso	Serbia	Horror

== See also ==
- List of science fiction films of the 2010s
- List of science fiction films of the 2020s
