= Jürgen Schornagel =

German actor (1939–2025)

- Born: 12 July 1939; Essen, Gau Essen, Germany
- Died: 8 July 2025 (aged 85); Wester-Ohrstedt, Schleswig-Holstein, Germany
- Occupation: Actor
- Years active: 1966–2025

Jürgen Schornagel (12 July 1939 – 8 July 2025) was a German actor. He appeared in more than one hundred films from 1966. He died in Wester-Ohrstedt, near Husum, on 8 July 2025, aged 85.

== Selected filmography ==
Year	Title	Role	Notes
1976	The Sternstein Manor		
1991	Manta, Manta		
1995	Brother of Sleep		
1997	Comedian Harmonists		
1997	14 Days to Life		
1999	Straight Shooter	Oberkriminalrat Andreas Bernd	
2001	Goebbels und Geduldig		
2004	Die Stunde der Offiziere	Generaloberst Ludwig Beck	TV film
2005	Antibodies		
2007	2030 – Aufstand der Alten		
