= Displaced =

Displaced may refer to:

- Forced displacement, the involuntary movement of people from their home
- Displaced (2006 film), a 2006 British feature film produced by Skylandian Pictures
- "Displaced" (Star Trek: Voyager), an episode of Star Trek: Voyager
