= Hemophage =

Hemophage may refer to:

- Hematophagy
- Plot device for Ultraviolet (film)
