= Joanna Taylor =

English actress and former model

- Born: 24 July 1978 (age 48); Tooting, London, England
- Other name: Joanna Clark
- Education: Guildford School of Acting
- Occupations: Actress; model
- Years active: 1995–present
- Spouse: Danny Murphy (m. 2004; sep. 2017)
- Children: 2

Joanna Taylor (born 24 July 1978) is an English actress and former model.

== Early life and career ==
Born in Tooting, South London, Taylor was a student at the Guildford School of Acting. Her big break came in 1999, when she won the role of Geri Hudson in Channel 4 teen soap Hollyoaks. She left in 2001, and has since starred in BBC One police drama, Merseybeat as PC Jackie Brown. In 2004, Taylor appeared in the American film Post Impact with Dean Cain. In 2005, Taylor turned to writing, contributing a weekly column to The Times from the perspective of a "footballer's wife" and in 2007, after taking an extended break from acting, she featured in the British independent film Back in Business, opposite Martin Kemp.

== Personal life ==
Taylor married English international footballer Danny Murphy in 2004. They have two children. The couple separated in 2017.

== Filmography ==
- Hollyoaks (1999–2001) — Geri Hudson
- Hollyoaks: Indecent Behaviour (2000) — Geri Hudson
- Merseybeat (2002–2004) — PC Jackie Brown
- Post Impact (2004) — Sarah Henley
- Back in Business (2007) — Fiona
