= Post Impact =

- Directed by: Christoph Schrewe
- Written by: Torsten Dewi; Christoph Schrewe
- Produced by: Phillip J. Roth
- Starring: Dean Cain; Bettina Zimmermann; Joanna Taylor; Nigel Bennett; Hanns Zischler
- Cinematography: Lorenzo Senatore
- Edited by: Ken Peters
- Music by: Guy Farley
- Distributed by: Unified Film Organization (UFO)
- Release date: June 12, 2004
- Running time: 90 minutes
- Countries: Germany; United States
- Languages: English; Spanish
- Budget: $3.2 million

Post Impact is a 2004 disaster film, written and directed by Christoph Schrewe and stars Dean Cain, Bettina Zimmermann, Joanna Taylor, Nigel Bennett, and Hanns Zischler. The film centers on the story of Captain Tom Parker, who is forced to leave his family behind during a massive impact event.

== Plot ==
In 2010, during a party at the US embassy in Berlin, Germany, scientist Gregor Starndorf is told that the comet he discovered, designated Bay-Leder 7, is headed toward Earth. It is large enough to cause an extinction level event and is only days away. He develops a satellite weapon called SolStar-2, which is moderately successful against the comet: the microwave beam cut Bay-Leder 7 in two, but the smaller part impacts in western Russia. The head of US embassy security, Captain Tom Parker picks up his family so that they can be evacuated. However, his superior, Colonel Waters, forces Parker to leave them behind, watching helplessly as the aircraft takes off. News reports depict the aftereffects of the impact.

Three years later, the situation has not improved. Due to the debris thrown into the atmosphere, all of Europe's population was evacuated to North Africa, where a new ruling body, the New United Northern States (NUNS), has been established. Oil prices also skyrocketed, enabling the Middle East to establish a firm grip on the world economy. A NUNS technician finds that SolStar-2 is still active. But the satellite can only be controlled from the command center below the Reichstag. The problem is, since the comet impact, Germany is covered in huge layers of ice. An aircraft, carrying personnel sent to investigate, explodes while flying over the area. Evidence points to SolStar-2 in the attack. NUNS President Miranda Harrison recruits Waters to lead an expedition—including ex-SAS Sarah Henley and Anna Starndorf, Gregor Starndorf's daughter—to find out who controls the satellite and destroy it. Although Parker knows the mission is led by Colonel Waters, he asks to join, secretly hoping that his family is somehow still alive.

During their flight in, SolStar-2 zeroes in on their position and destroys the aircraft. The team manages to parachute out with two armoured personnel carriers (APCs), though. During the trip, they must cross through Cologne and use the Cologne Cathedral as a guide there. However, they lose several men to marauders and one APC to an ice geyser. When they finally reach Berlin, they find that the city is buried in several meters of snow.

Shortly afterwards, they come under attack from survivors. There are about 600 people hiding in the subway tunnels and supplied by the "Distributors". They find out a blind man called "the doctor" is hiding below the Reichstag and supplies the people with food. The doctor's quarters are actually a verdant greenhouse and he is Gregor Starndorf. He explains that he and his chief engineer Klaus Hintze were the designers of SolStar-2. It was originally meant to be a new power source to lessen the dependency on oil, but due to military funding, it became a weapon. He orders Hintze to reactivate the satellite to execute a program he has devised to extend its area of effect and stop the permanent winter. He is alarmed to hear that Hintze is using it as a weapon, but the Distributors suddenly return and during the battle a sniper kills him.

Enraged, the four confront Hintze, who is powering up the satellite to destroy Tangier, the NUNS' headquarter city, as a revenge for having been left behind. Sarah shoots him and Col. Waters apologizes to Parker for his earlier actions. Sarah sees an intruder and orders Parker to investigate. While he is away, Sarah unexpectedly kills Waters and orders Anna to retarget SolStar-2 to destroy Mecca and possibly other targets in the Middle East, for which she says she will be paid $10 million by an unnamed group. Parker returns and, despite being wounded, attacks Sarah, nearly losing before Anna shoots her. Anna aims the satellite at Europe and executes her father's program to "kickstart the weather," causing SolStar-2 to use up its last energy reserves to release a massive, wide-beamed microwave torrent which begins warming the atmosphere.

Parker and Anna continue the search for his family and find his home. Inside he discovers his wife's final message to him beside their frozen bodies. Back outside, they watch the thick, permanent clouds over Germany dissipate, revealing the warming sun once again.

== Cast ==
- Dean Cain as Captain Tom Parker
- Joanna Taylor as Sarah Henley
- Bettina Zimmermann as Anna Starndorf
- Nigel Bennett as Colonel Preston Waters
- John Keogh as Klaus Hintze
- Cheyenne Rushing as Sandra Parker
- Hanns Zischler as Dr. Gregor Starndorf
- Dulcie Smart as President Miranda Harrisson
- Adrienne McQueen as Sheila Azeal
- Mike Carr as Captain Michaels
