= Lost City Raiders =

- Genre: Action; Adventure; Science fiction
- Screenplay by: Jean de Segonzac
- Directed by: Jean de Segonzac
- Starring: James Brolin; Ian Somerhalder; Jamie King; Bettina Zimmermann
- Theme music composer: Gert Wilden, Jr.
- Countries of origin: United States; Germany; Austria
- Original language: English

Production
- Executive producers: Jonas Bauer; Rola Bauer; Tim Halkin
- Producers: Marlow De Mardt; Brigid Olen
- Cinematography: Giulio Biccari
- Editors: Hans Funck; Scott Powell
- Running time: 90 minutes
- Production companies: ProSieben; Sci Fi Channel; Tandem Communications
- Budget: $6 million

Original release
- Network: Syfy
- Release: October 31, 2008

Lost City Raiders is a 2008 made-for-television science fiction film written and directed by Jean de Segonzac. It starred James Brolin, Ian Somerhalder, Jamie King, and Bettina Zimmermann.

== Plot ==
In year 2048, global warming has caused much of the surface of the earth to become flooded. In the city of New Vatican, Cardinal Battaglia believes that the global inundation can be gotten rid of by using the "scepter of Moses". This is the staff that Moses used to part the Red Sea during The Exodus.

Cardinal Battaglia contacts John Kubiak (James Brolin) and his sons Jack (Ian Somerhalder) and Thomas (Jamie King). The Kubiak family is raiding the sunken cities for various treasures lost beneath the waves. The Kubiaks are to assist Brother Fontana and Father Giacopetti in a submarine to retrieve the scepter and save the earth. They are opposed by Nicholas Filiminov (Ben Cross), a major land dealer who wants the scepter for his own purposes; having forced the water to rise to cover the remaining land, survivors will be forced to live in his planned floating communities, and he can then purchase the sunken land for a pittance before lowering the water level again. He enlists the help of Giovanna Becker, Jack's ex, to help him find the scepter. Meanwhile, a waitress Cara joins the Kubiak team as the ship mechanic and helps Jack and Thomas, especially after their father is killed trying to fend off Filiminov's men.

Despite the attempted intervention of an insane Father Giacopetti who sees the Rising as God's punishment for mankind's sins, the new Team Kubiak are able to activate an ancient chamber that triggers a gas explosion and consequently lowering of the flood waters. The film ends with the team having dinner and contemplating their future as they visit the thirty-one other chambers listed on the map as activating that one chamber only caused the Mediterranean to drop ten meters while not affecting the rest of the world.

== Cast ==
- James Brolin as John Kubiak
- Ian Somerhalder as Jack Kubiak
- Bettina Zimmermann as Giovanna Becker
- Jamie King as Thomas Kubiak
- Élodie Frenck as Cara
- Michael Mendl as Cardinal Battaglia
- Jeremy Crutchley as Father Giacopetti
- Ben Cross as Nicholas Filiminov

== Production ==
German commercial television station ProSieben, the American cable television network Sci Fi Channel, Austrian production company Tandem Communications produced the film. Its budget was US$6 million.

The film was first announced in March 2006. Tandem Communications intentionally picked an international cast, part of the company's successful strategy of making films easily marketable around the world. Within weeks of the announcement of the production, the film had already been pre-sold in Germany, France, and Spain.

Principal cinematography was to have begun in the summer of 2006, but did not begin until April 2008.

The 90-minute film was intended to air in two parts. The Sci Fi Channel hoped that it would lead to a series. The film had its worldwide television debut on 31 October 2008 in Germany. It debuted on the Sci Fi Channel on 22 November 2008.

== Reception ==
David Hinckley in the New York Daily News found the production values exceptionally low and the film predictable. "Sadly, the action turns out to be fairly predictable. Not as predictable as Brolin's acting, but predictable nonetheless, which may be why the filmmakers insert a romantic subplot involving not one, but two spirited, adventuresome women." Linda Stasi of the New York Post called it bad and cheesy. The Tampa Tribune called it "Waterworld without the budget" and an "awful movie".
