= 2030 – Aufstand der Jungen =

2010 film

- Directed by: Jörg Lühdorff
- Screenplay by: Jörg Lühdorff
- Starring: Bettina Zimmermann; Lavinia Wilson; Barnaby Metschurat; Kathrin von Steinburg
- Cinematography: Konstantin Kröning
- Release date: 1 July 2010 (Munich Film Festival)
- Running time: 90 minutes
- Country: Germany
- Language: German

2030 – Aufstand der Jungen, released in 2010, is a German film directed by Jörg Lühdorff.
