= Merseybeat (TV series) =

British police procedural TV series (2001–2004)

- Genre: Drama; Police procedural
- Created by: Chris Murray
- Starring: Haydn Gwynne; John McArdle; Jonathan Kerrigan; Chris Walker; David Hargreaves; Michelle Holmes; Josie d'Arby; Joanna Taylor; Leslie Ash; Scot Williams; Mark Womack; Shelley Conn
- Theme music composer: Jonathan Kerrigan (Series 1—3)
- Composers: Garry Hughes; David Lowe
- Country of origin: United Kingdom
- Original language: English
- No. of series: 4
- No. of episodes: 38

Production
- Executive producers: Mal Young; Chris Murray
- Producers: Ken Horn; Kay Patrick; Chris Ballantyne; Maria Ward
- Production locations: Widnes, Cheshire
- Cinematography: Geoff Healey
- Editors: Ian Collins; Mike Bloore; John Rosser
- Running time: 60 minutes
- Production company: BBC Birmingham

Original release
- Network: BBC One
- Release: 16 July 2001 – 19 January 2004

Merseybeat is a British television police procedural drama television series, created and principally written by Chris Murray, first broadcast on BBC One on 16 July 2001. The series follows the personal and professional lives of one shift of police officers from the fictional Newton Park police station in Merseyside, England. A total of four series were broadcast, with the final episode airing on 19 January 2004. The series had an ensemble cast, initially led by Haydn Gwynne as Superintendent Susan Blake. However, only three actors remained with the programme through all four series: John McArdle, Chris Walker and David Hargreaves. In 2001, prior to the programme's official launch, the first episode attracted controversy due to alleged similarities between its plot and the murder of James Bulger. However, BBC bosses defended the series, stating "there are no associations with the tragic case of James Bulger".

In July and August 2002, Merseybeat faced strong criticism upon its return for a second series. The broadcasting standards commission criticised the quality of the series, and ratings fell sharply. In June 2002, ratings fell below five million viewers for the first time in the programme's history and, in August of the same year, The Guardian reported that the number of viewers had dropped by one million compared to the opening episode of the second series. In late 2003, when Merseybeat commenced its fourth series, it underwent a major revamp, including the scrapping of the title sequence and theme tune. A new closing theme was introduced, while each individual episode opened with a different musical number, including tracks from the likes of The Mock Turtles, Travis and Cast. A more "gritty" approach to the series was also taken as part of the revamp, with the introduction of the station's Criminal Investigation Department, led by Mark Womack, formerly of Liverpool 1 as DI Pete Hammond.

For the first three series, filming took place mainly in the Cheshire towns of Widnes and Runcorn (both within the Borough of Halton), including other locations within Merseyside - making frequent use of local landmarks such as the Silver Jubilee Bridge and Fiddlers Ferry power station. The police station itself was a disused Golden Wonder factory, which is located in Widnes. For the fourth and final series, filming moved wholly to Liverpool; with some locations used in St Helens, Merseyside. The programme is notable for having never been repeated since broadcast; and despite strong interest from fans, it has never been released on DVD. As of October 2023, series 1 and 2 were shown on UKTV Play, and series 3 and 4 were also available on UKTV Play in early 2024. During filming, the original title of the show was Silver Command.

== Cast ==
- Haydn Gwynne as Supt. Susan Blake (Series 1–3)
- John McArdle as Insp./Supt. Jim Oulton
- Jonathan Kerrigan as PC Steve Traynor (Series 1–3)
- Chris Walker as PC Larry "Tiger" Barton
- David Hargreaves as Sgt. Bill Gentle
- Michelle Holmes as PC/Sgt. Connie Harper (Series 1–3)
- Josie d'Arby as PC Jodie Finn (Series 2–4)
- Joanna Taylor as PC Jackie Brown (Series 2–4)
- Leslie Ash as Insp. Charlie Eden (Series 3–4)
- Scot Williams as PC Glenn Freeman (Series 4)
- Mark Womack as DI Pete Hammond (Series 4)
- Shelley Conn as PC Miriam Da Silva (Series 1)
- Danny Lawrence as Sgt. Danny Jackson (Series 1)
- Bernard Merrick as Sgt. Mark "Pepper" Salt (Series 2–3)
- Gary Cargill as Sgt. Lester Cartwright (Series 4)
- Kaye Wragg as PC Dee Milton (Series 1)
- Kevin Harvey as DC Vince Peterson (Series 4)
- Claire Sweeney as DS Roz Kelly (Series 4)
- Eileen O'Brien as SRO Maddie Wright (Series 1–3)
- Tupele Dorgu as SRO Natalie Vance (Series 4)
- Stephen Moore as Ch. Con. Mike Bishop (Series 1–2)
- Sean Arnold as Ch. Con. William Harvey (Series 3)
- Joshua Littler as Charlie Blake (Series 1)
- Paul Bown as Dr. Al Blake (Series 1-3)

== Series overview ==
Series	Episodes	Originally released	
Series	Episodes	First released	Last released
1	10	16 July 2001	24 September 2001
2	10	24 June 2002	26 August 2002
3	10	18 November 2002	3 February 2003
4	8	17 November 2003	19 January 2004

== Episode list ==
=== Series 1 (2001) ===
No. overall	No. in series	Title	Directed by	Written by	Original release date	UK viewers (millions)
1	1	"Deep End"	Brian Kelly	Chris Murray	16 July 2001	8.16
Supt. Blake co-ordinates a search when an 11-year old boy is reported missing by his parents. Witnesses claim to have seen a young boy running scared in nearby woods, and when the team go to investigate, PC Milton (Kaye Wragg) is injured after being pushed off a cliff face by a possible suspect. With emotions running high, the team try to find the man responsible as well as locate the missing boy. When a link to the boy's estranged father is discovered, the team realise they may not be dealing with the psychopath that they first expected. However, when PC Milton's condition worsens and she dies in hospital of her injuries, the case is upgraded to a murder enquiry.
2	2	"Step by Step"	Robert Del Maestro	Chris Murray	23 July 2001	6.60
Ch. Insp. Oulton tries to help out an old friend, Phil Scott (Duncan Preston), when an arson attack burns down a homeless charity that he volunteers for. A link to other local arson attacks is suspected, but Oulton soon realises that Scott may have been having extra-marital relations with an underage girl - which may indicate a motive for the attack. Meanwhile, a young girl brought into custody on suspicion of shoplifting turns out to be withholding an extra special surprise - a baby. And when tempers between the girl and her father boil over, it's not long before the girl enters early labour, and Sgt. Jackson realises that he may have to deliver the baby himself.
3	3	"Coming of Age"	Brian Kelly	Patrick Melanaphy	30 July 2001	6.26
Sgt. Gentle decides it's time for a change and decides to go out on the beat with PC Traynor, and the pair investigate a burglary at the home of an antiques dealer, and soon discover a link with several other local robberies. However, one thing that did not account for, is that one of the robbers is a relative of the dealer - a vital piece of information which could lead them to the ringleader of a dangerous gang. Meanwhile, Ch. Insp. Oulton tries to help out an old friend who has found himself on the wrong side of the law - but realises that he may have completely misjudged his loyalties when evidence is uncovered suggesting that the man may have been guilty after all.
4	4	"Unexploded Bombs"	Richard Signy	Chris Murray	6 August 2001	6.48
PCs Traynor and Barton go undercover in an attempt to catch a gang of muggers, whose mode of operations is to dip the purses of their elderly victims whilst on the bus. However, Traynor fails to account for an elderly woman who is at the end of her tether - and when an already tender situation boils over, she unleashes a machine gun and accidentally manages to shoot one of the youths. Meanwhile, Supt. Blake attends a medical convention with her husband, and ends up chatting to a heavily-pregnant woman who seems on edge. However, when the woman later confesses to the murder of her own baby some 12 years previously, Blake finds herself caught up in the middle.
5	5	"Dead Time"	Richard Signy	Graham Mitchell	13 August 2001	6.56
PCs Traynor and Barton embark on a high-speed chase in an attempt to catch three joyriding youths in a stolen car. However, when the chase goes off-road, Traynor is forced to call for help after crashing the panda car. Meanwhile, a young boy, Scott Carter, has been attacked in his own home, and Ch. Insp. Oulton believes that Robbie Elliot (Kenneth MacDonald), who was convicted of the murder of Scott's sister, Helen, may have been responsible for the attack. Helen and Scott's grieving father decides to pay Elliot a visit after a tip-off from Oulton, but when Scott dies, Elliot is targeted and finds himself trapped inside a burning house, with both he and his daughter in grave danger.
6	6	"Thicker than Water"	Tom Clegg	Steve Lawson	20 August 2001	6.90
PCs Harper and Traynor tail a youngster on suspicion of credit card fraud, unaware that he is one of Harper's relatives. However, Harper's decision to let the boy off with a caution backfires when they discover he is responsible for a string of local burglaries. Meanwhile, PCs Da Silva and Barton investigate a domestic violence case, involving a man who has been repeatedly arrested for beating his wife, but after she is threatened and attacked, Da Silva sees red when making the arrest, and physically restrains the suspect to prevent him from talking to his wife. The suspect decides to put in a complaint, but it's not long before his wife's temper finally blows and she attacks him.
7	7	"Fools Rush In"	Paul Walker	Joe Ainsworth	27 August 2001	6.75
PCs Barton and Harper find a young girl washed up on the riverbank, who they find has been badly beaten. With the girl unable to speak a word of English, they suspect she may have entered the country illegally, but a vital lead comes when they uncover a link to a local strip club, and suspect that thugs tasked by the club's owner, who is an arch enemy of Ch. Insp. Oulton, may have been responsible for the beating. Oulton's investigation of his nemesis leads him to uncover that his own wife is having an affair. Meanwhile, Supt. Blake decides to go out on the beat with PC Da Silva to prove she can still cut the mustard, but comes up against a tricky shoplifter who fakes dementia.
8	8	"For Better or for Worse"	Robert Del Maestro	Joe Ainsworth	10 September 2001	7.23
Sgt. Gentle leads the team in search of an attacker after his wife is brutally mugged. Angry at the lack of evidence against prime suspect Michelle Talbot, PC Barton decides to unleash his own brand of justice, and has a quiet word in the ear of her ex-boyfriend - which results in Talbot receiving a savage beating. Meanwhile, Supt. Blake and PC Traynor lead a talk on crime prevention at a local women's rights group, but when Supt. Blake goes to investigate loud music coming from a nearby pub, she is confronted by an angry landlord who is trying to commit suicide with a shotgun. Ch. Insp. Oulton then decides to risk his own life by offering himself as a second hostage.
9	9	"Crying Out Loud"	Rob Evans	Chris Murray	17 September 2001	7.15
PCs Harper and Traynor tail a group of teenage joyriders, but the chase ends in tragedy when the youths crash their car, and the young female driver is killed. PC Harper finds herself on the receiving end of a slap from the girl's angry father, but Supt. Blake isn't happy to discover that the defendant is a good friend of the chief constable - and comes close to resigning when she discovers that he leaked information claiming that PC Harper was responsible for the crash. Meanwhile, Oulton investigates when Blake receives a number of anonymous gifts, which appear to be from a stalker. He questions a murder suspect that Blake previously convicted who was recently released from prison.
10	10	"What Goes Around"	Keith Boak	Chris Murray	24 September 2001	7.83
Supt. Blake's husband Al is seriously injured when the car he is driving explodes, and SOCO find evidence of a bomb. Blake suspects that he is a victim of her stalker and that she was the intended target. Ch. Insp. Oulton continues to investigate a murder suspect who swore revenge on Blake some seven years previously, but soon finds the man dead in his flat, having supposedly taken his own life. Supt. Blake's neighbour manages to identify a man seen running away from her house around the time of the explosion, but his description doesn't match that of the deceased. When suspect Phillip Kitchener is later identified, PC Barton decides to take the law into his own hands once again.

=== Series 2 (2002) ===
The second series introduced three new main characters into the cast - probationary PCs Jodie Finn (Josie D'Arby) and Jackie Brown (Joanna Taylor), as well as new custody Sergeant Mark 'Pepper' Salt (Bernard Merrick). This series saw the programme take a step away from crime-fighting and focuses more on the personal relationships between the main characters, much like the show's main rival at the time, The Bill. Episode two was broadcast an hour later than usual due to the content of the episode; this however resulted in an increase of viewership, with more than 1.5m additional viewers tuning in compared to the previous week.

No. overall	No. in series	Title	Directed by	Written by	Original release date	UK viewers (millions)
11	1	"Ghosts"	Rob Evans	Chris Murray	24 June 2002	5.57
Newton Park's newest recruits, PCs Jackie Brown and Jodie Finn, both have a roller coaster of a first day as the team deal with a former police officer who manages to escape from custody after being sentenced to five years in jail. The arrival of Supt. Blake's ex-husband Guy causes trouble for the team after he and his friend are arrested on suspicion of drink driving. To top it all off, Ch. Insp. Oulton's wife has petitioned for divorce and PC Barton's caught napping on the job. And with Blake tied up at work, her husband Al realises that the strain on their marriage is becoming clearer day by day. But Blake soon has other problems to worry about after she is attacked on her way home.
12	2	"The Morning After"	Rob Evans	Joe Ainsworth	1 July 2002	7.02
The aftermath of Supt. Blake's attack unfolds as she once again comes head to head with the Chief Constable, this time during a progress meeting with a young mother whose son was left disabled after being caught in a road traffic accident involving a group of joyriders. Blake decides to confront her ex-husband in an attempt to discover whether or not he was responsible. Meanwhile, PC Barton arrests one of his old school friends for animal cruelty, but is surprised when he decides to turn grass on his own brother. PC Traynor decides to further his relationship with Blue McCormack. PCs Finn and Brown receive a harsh reprimand from Supt. Blake for their catfight the previous night.
13	3	"Child's Play"	Jo Johnson	Chris Murray	8 July 2002	4.89
PC Finn decides to turn lone ranger after an accusation of child abuse is made by a fighting couple during her and PC Traynor's investigation into a report of noisy neighbours. After confronting the defendant's father and practically accusing him of abuse, PC Finn is reigned in and Supt. Blake takes over the investigation. As it transpires that the defendant was being abused by his stepfather, Supt. Blake breaks down in the arms of PC Finn and reveals that she was raped two weeks previously, but asks her not to tell anyone. Meanwhile, Ch. Insp. Oulton continues to rebuild his relationship with his wife, while Tiger's decision to bring his dog to work ends in disaster when it disappears.
14	4	"Crossing the Line"	Jo Johnson	Joe Ainsworth	15 July 2002	5.60
PC Finn is unable to withhold the secret of Supt. Blake's attack any longer, and decides to inform Insp. Oulton, which opens up a whole new can of worms when he decides that her husband, Al, should be kept in the picture. Meanwhile, PC Traynor investigates an attack on Blue McCormack's club. When Blue reveals that the perpetrator is a dodgy local supplier whom she recently cancelled an order with, Traynor decides to issue a harsh warning of his own, much to the upset of PC Finn. PCs Barton and Brown learn the true value of friendship when Barton attempts to move a dead body in order to avoid filling out the necessary paperwork, but Brown is unable to keep his secret.
15	5	"Desperately Seeking"	Andy Hay	Chris Murray	22 July 2002	6.18
Supt. Blake tries to convince her husband that he could not have prevented the rape. Ch. Insp. Oulton questions her ex-husband, Guy Morgan, but is unable to break his alibi. Further enquiries lead the team to local villain Cody Martin, who has a history of sex crime and eventually confesses to the attack - but inconsistencies in his story convince Ch. Insp. Oulton that the real rapist has yet to be caught. Meanwhile, Chief Constable Bishop takes a shine to PC Brown, and asks her to be his eyes and ears within the station. PC Traynor warns crime boss Phil Brack that Blue is no longer prepared to continue accepting deliveries of dodgy booze and fags, but he refuses to play ball.
16	6	"Unhappy Medium"	Andy Hay	Joe Ainsworth	29 July 2002	5.37
Sgt. Harper and PC Brown take opposite sides in a dispute between two neighbours, when two young lads are caught terrorising an elderly couple with a motorbike. However, PC Brown realises that her judgement call may have been way off when tensions boil over and one of the young boys ends up getting stabbed. Meanwhile, PCs Traynor and Finn deal with a psychic medium who is being threatened by an angry customer. When he is brought into custody, he makes reference to Supt. Blake's attack, and Ch. Insp. Oulton tries to use him to identify a suspect. Sgt. Harper and Ch. Insp. Oulton get intimate, while PC Traynor delivers a harsh warning to crime boss Phil Brack.
17	7	"Over and Out"	Robert Del Maestro	Colin Bytheway	5 August 2002	5.98
Sgt. Harper is forced to hold a bedside vigil for crime boss Phil Brack following his brutal assault at the hands of PC Traynor. PCs Barton and Brown suspect that one of Brack's dealers may be involved in his attack. However, after following him to Blue's club, their impatience and cockiness causes them to stumble right into the middle of a CID operation, blowing months of secret surveillance. Meanwhile, PC Traynor, unable to silence his conscience any longer, admits to Insp. Oulton that he was responsible for Brack's attack. Oulton, however, chooses to back up his man and forces Brack to keep silent. PC Finn warns Blue to stay away from PC Traynor for the sake of his career.
18	8	"Going Down"	Robert Del Maestro	Chris Murray	12 August 2002	5.92
PCs Brown and Finn uncover a scam involving two youths who are 'faking' car accidents in at attempt to steal cash from their victims. Meanwhile, Ch. Insp. Oulton discovers that his daughter's fiance, Kit, has a criminal record for possession of drugs. Sgt. Gentle goes undercover in Blue's nightclub to gather evidence against him, but the operation goes awry when Oulton is forced to arrest his own daughter. PC Barton finds himself playing landlord when Oulton decides to separate from his wife, but soon discovers his night of intimacy with Sgt. Harper. After digging around, Sgt. Gentle uncovers new evidence and manages to break Guy Morgan's alibi for the night of Supt. Blake's rape.
19	9	"Long Shadows"	Adrian Bean	Colin Bytheway	19 August 2002	5.68
Caroline Morgan turns up at the station and demands to see Supt. Blake, and subsequently reveals that Guy was not at home on the night of her rape, as she previously claimed. PC Brown becomes the face of a new campaign to raise awareness of the force amongst young people, but at a PR stand set up in the local shopping centre, she is anonymously handed a blackmail letter which claims if she does not hand over £500, nude photos taken when she was a teenager will be leaked to the press. Although she initially decides to pay the money, PC Finn decides to dig deeper. Unable to hide her suspicions any longer, Blake invites Guy out for dinner and confronts him face-to-face.
20	10	"End Game"	Adrian Bean	Joe Ainsworth	26 August 2002	5.93
Supt. Blake finally comes to realise that her attacker was none other than her ex-husband, Guy Morgan. With Morgan on the run, Sgt. Gentle, who is supposed to be in hospital for his brain operation, decides to lead the manhunt, but after confronting Morgan in a local pub, collapses and ends up being blue-lighted to the hospital by PC Traynor. Meanwhile, PCs Barton and Brown investigate when Barton's ex-wife claims to have been burgled. With Sgt. Gentle critically ill in hospital, Supt. Blake decides to take matters into her own hands. Taking a gun from the property store, she leads Guy Morgan back to his house, where she ties him up to a radiator and confronts him about the attack.

=== Series 3 (2002–03) ===
No. overall	No. in series	Title	Directed by	Written by	Original release date	UK viewers (millions)
21	1	"Love is Not Love"	Andy Hay	Chris Murray	18 November 2002	6.69
The inquest into the death of Guy Morgan begins, but both Supt. Blake and Insp. Oulton choose to lie to the board in order to save face. But when Blake is later exonerated of any wrongdoing, Oulton becomes the scapegoat. Meanwhile, PCs Traynor and Barton deal with a father and son fighting in the street. They discover that their feuding is the result of the boy having sexual relations with his step-sister, which PC Traynor passes off - until a shocking revelation reveals the siblings are actually blood related. PC Brown deals with a nuisance caller, only to arrive at his address to find him dead, while Sgt. Harper discovers she is pregnant with Insp. Oulton's child.
22	2	"Happy As..."	Andy Hay	Joe Ainsworth	25 November 2002	6.07
PCs Barton and Traynor deal with a money lender whose front window has been put through by a youth. However, when they later catch up with the boy, PC Barton takes a shine to him - and his mother - and offers to mentor him. However, his methods of trying to get the loanshark to drop the charges against the lad lead him into conflict with Supt. Blake. PC Finn and Sgt. Harper pursue a gang of joyriders terrorising the local Domingo estate. However Sgt. Harper suspects PC Finn's judgement is impaired and has a quiet word with Supt. Blake. Later called back to the estate, PC Finn becomes tired of Sgt. Harper's niggling and decides to go hell for leather - with devastating consequences.
23	3	"The Good Lord Giveth..."	Adrian Bean	Chris Murray	2 December 2002	5.64
Following the near fatal crash, the team set out to find those responsible. PCs Traynor and Brown arrest Mo Ferrer, a convicted car thief, who they find is covered in bruises which could have resulted from the collision - but are disappointed when his girlfriend provides him with a rock solid alibi. Meanwhile, PC Barton takes on another suspect, Farmer, who denies all knowledge of the incident. However, after a disastrous date with his girlfriend, Barton decides to take his anger out on Farmer, who reveals that Ferrer was responsible for the crash. When PC Brown is confronted by Ferrer's girlfriend, who is wielding a gun, Supt. Blake orders armed support to shoot her dead.
24	4	"Under the Cosh"	Adrian Bean	Joe Ainsworth	9 December 2002	6.54
Supt. Blake finds herself on tenterhooks as the inquest into Rosa Franklin's death comes to a conclusion. Blake briefs the troops and warns them not to cause any trouble on the estate while Rosa's funeral takes place, but a guilt-ridden PC Brown ignores orders and attends the funeral, sparking mob rule with the mourners and PC Barton to restrain the dead girl's father. When he makes a complaint of police harassment, Blake is forced to take Insp. Oulton's advice and visit the man in an attempt to talk him round. Meanwhile, Oulton's father is implicated in a murder enquiry when a fellow alcoholic from the local pub is murdered and dumped in the rubbish tip outside.
25	5	"On Borrowed Time"	Jane Powell	Chris Murray	16 December 2002	6.37
Supt. Blake finds her operational powers have been reduced in light of the Rosa Franklin enquiry. Tired of being under the watchful eye of the Chief Constable, she decides to tender her resignation - but takes on one last case with PC Barton, involving a doctor who nearly had a fatal car crash after his brakes were cut. But when Blake discovers the prime suspect is dying of a terminal illness, she helps her achieve her last wish by exposing the doctor as having covered up a fatal error in a misconduct trial which caused the death of her husband. Meanwhile, PC Traynor is arrested by PC Finn after brawling with his brother, but PC Finn manages to get him to drop the charges - on a promise.
26	6	"Only the Lonely"	Jane Powell	Nick Saltrese	6 January 2003	6.82
Following Supt. Blake's departure, Insp. Oulton is offered a promotion to Superintendent. Meanwhile, PCs Barton and Traynor are on the look out for a man seen hanging around the local toilets looking to hook up with rent boys. They manage to catch him in the act, but Sgt. Harper is surprised to discover he is none other than her old school teacher, whom she admired and took inspiration from. Meanwhile, Charlie Eden manages to apprehend a wanted shoplifter on her way to start her first day. PC Traynor is tasked with looking after the prisoner, but when he falls asleep on the job, he awakes to find the prisoner dead, and his subsequent actions land him in deep trouble.
27	7	"Precious Illusions"	Dominic Keavey	Colin Bytheway	13 January 2003	6.14
Insp. Eden and PC Brown arrest a man for kerb crawling, but he claims that he was looking for his missing daughter, whom he suspects may now be on the game. Supt. Oulton offers to give the man his daughter's address, much to Insp. Eden's dismay. When he and PC Barton are later called to the scene of a disturbance, they find the man threatening to harm his daughter's pimp. Meanwhile, PC Barton has troubles of his own when he tries to help his girlfriend's son, Jack, who is being bullied at school by a young tearaway. An irate man turns up looking for Insp. Eden, claiming that she has ditched him at the altar, while PC Traynor tries to set aside his differences with his brother.
28	8	"The Thirty-Third Degree"	Dominic Keavey	Joe Ainsworth	20 January 2003	5.92
PC Barton enlists Jack's help on a surveillance job after he expresses an interest in joining the police force. However, when he later witnesses a kidnapping on his way to school, he decides to help PC Barton by becoming star witness. PCs Traynor and Finn investigate the boy's tip off, and discover that the victim was PC Traynor's brother, who is found badly beaten after two henchmen came to collect repayment on his debt. When he reveals one of the attackers was serial offender John Whittle, Supt. Oulton decides to take the lead in the investigation. Meanwhile, Insp. Eden deals with a feud between a father and son, but is angered when the accused asks Sgt. Gentle to pull some strings.
29	9	"Love Hurts"	Robert Del Maestro	Joe Ainsworth	27 January 2003	5.82
Sgt. Harper and PC Brown are called to the home of a medical research activist, who has received a suspicious package in the post - which turns out to be a fake bomb. When he names two possible suspects, Supt. Oulton organises a raid on their home. However, PC Finn soon finds evidence to suggest that one of the suspects may in fact be an undercover journalist. Meanwhile, PC Barton ends up playing mum when Supt. Oulton's dad Bernie is forced to go to hospital after suffering with chest pains. PC Finn discovers the truth about PC Traynor's brother, but when a confrontation between him and a local skinhead in the pub ends in tragedy, will she decide to cover up a possible murder?
30	10	"Peace for the Wicked"	Robert Del Maestro	Chris Murray	3 February 2003	5.47
Insp. Eden and PC Barton deal with the disappearance of a nine-year-old girl. Meanwhile, local entrepreneur Des Orton comes into the station demanding to see Supt. Oulton. He claims that two officers from Newton Park were involved in the beating of his son, Pete. PCs Traynor and Finn are questioned, but deny all knowledge of the attack. When the boy dies, PC Finn decides to come clean, resulting in both herself and PC Traynor being suspended. However, when the angry father firebombs the home of PC Traynor's brother, he makes a life-or-death decision to try and save him. Meanwhile, PC Barton decides to swallow his pride and declare his love for Mary. But will all work out?

=== Series 4 (2003–04) ===
No. overall	No. in series	Title	Directed by	Written by	Original release date	UK viewers (millions)
31	1	"All the Aces"	Keith Boak	Chris Murray	17 November 2003	5.55
An investigation is launched when an 11-year-old boy is attacked by a thug looking to recover a debt owed by his mum. The star witness, Tom Vale, is reluctant to testify, forcing DI Hammond to inform Supt. Oulton that Vale is under the witness protection programme for murdering his parents when he was just 12 years old. PC Freeman decides to take it upon himself to interrogate a local drug user for information, which leads to an arrest. Supt. Oulton manages to persuade Vale to sign on the dotted line, but during the pursuit of the crimelord who ordered the hit, PC Barton unwittingly loses control of his patrol car and accidentally mows down a pedestrian, causing her death.
32	2	"Warrior Moon"	Sven Arnstein	Chris Murray	24 November 2003	5.53
PCs Barton and Freeman find a body of a woman floating in the docks during a routine callout to the Mersey. PCs Brown and Finn find an abandoned car covered in blood. Insp. Eden interviews the owner of the car, Craig Cameron, who claims that his wife Kelly disappeared in the early hours after walking out of the marital home following a blazing row. When the unidentified body found by PCs Barton and Freeman is identified as Kelly Cameron, DI Hammond arrests Craig on suspicion of murder. However, Insp. Eden isn't convinced of his guilt and sets about proving that someone else was responsible for her death. Meanwhile, Supt. Oulton makes arrangements for PC Barton's stag-do.
33	3	"Broken Dreams"	Keith Boak	Chris Murray	1 December 2003	5.52
Following the discovery of evidence linking him to a spate of shoplifting incidents, PCs Brown and Finn go in search of 11-year-old Lewis Roe, and find him living home alone. Lewis claims that his father, Terry, has gone on holiday to Majorca, while his mum, Hannah, walked out of the family home two years ago. PC Finn tries to track down Hannah to prevent Lewis from being taken into care. Meanwhile, PC Freeman continues moonlighting, this time posing a limousine driver. But when he finds himself caught up in a major drugs operation being run by DI Hammond, he realises that he has no choice but to come clean. PC Barton's wedding day is interrupted by an unwanted guest.
34	4	"True Colours"	Sven Arnstein	Chris Murray	8 December 2003	5.40
Barry McCormick, the owner of a local amusement arcade, is cleared of the murder of two burglars on the grounds of self-defence, but within hours of his release his arcade is the target of a copycat attack. When Supt. Oulton offers McCormick his unreserved support, PC Finn expresses her discomfort and decides to dig deeper to try and uncover a potential ulterior motive. Meanwhile, DI Hammond investigates an adoption agency selling children to the highest bidder, and asks Insp. Eden to go undercover with him, posing as a married couple to interrogate the agency's self-proclaimed miracle maker, Jerry Kincaid. However, the operation starts to reignite feelings between the former couple.
35	5	"Angels with Dirty Faces"	Adrian Bean	Nick Saltrese	15 December 2003	5.40
After attending the funeral of convicted murderer Terry Saunders, Sgt. Gentle teams up with Supt. Oulton's father, whom he originally worked on Terry's case with, to investigate the possibility that they convicted the wrong man. PCs Barton and Freeman investigate a spate of criminal damage targeted at a local pub landlord, Jimmy Evans, and soon make connections with Sgt. Gentle's case. PCs Brown and Finn investigate the theft of £20,000 from a former armed robber who has recently passed away, and are led to question a local parish priest, Father Hopkirk, who is a close friend of Sgt. Cartwright. DI Hammond sticks up for PC Brown when she is injured in a charity football match.
36	6	"Repeat Offender"	Ian Barnes	Rod Lewis	5 January 2004	Under 5.19
DI Hammond's night of passion with PC Brown is interrupted by reports of a fourth attack committed by a serial sex attacker targeting lone women walking home late at night. Supt. Oulton is displeased with the lack of progress in the case and orders DI Hammond to make a breakthrough sooner rather than later. PC Barton interviews a young boy suspected of damaging a number of parked cars with a pen knife and soon realises that he could be the vital witness that DI Hammond is looking for. Natalie's brother Toby is hauled in by PC Freeman after being caught driving a stolen car, and although he admits to the theft, PC Freeman suspects he may be part of a gang stealing cars to order.
37	7	"Distant Vices"	Adrian Bean	Nick Saltrese	12 January 2004	Under 5.12
DI Hammond teams up with DS Roz Kelly from the drugs squad to investigate when university student Claire Robinson is found dead in a children's playground, having been sliced open and her stomach contents removed. Suspecting that Claire may have been a drugs mule, DS Kelly leans on a local dealer who claims to have information on the ringleader. Supt. Oulton reconnects with an old friend from school, Sheila O'Brien, after her interior design shop is the target of two break-ins. However, when her ex-husband makes a complaint against Supt. Oulton for harassment and aggressive behaviour, Sgt. Gentle digs a little deeper into Sheila's past, and finds some shocking revelations.
38	8	"Day of Reckoning"	Ian Barnes	Chris Murray	19 January 2004	5.54
PCs Barton and Brown investigate when a single mother claims that her 15-year-old daughter has been receiving sexual messages from an older man posing as an American student in an online chatroom. The pair initially dismiss the case until Sgt. Gentle suggests that it may be connected to a similar unsolved case in which an underage girl was raped. DI Hammond's suspicions of DS Kelly's involvement with ex-con Eddie Lewis continue to grow, forcing him to visit Lewis's partner in crime, Jay Denton. Denton sends him in the direction of Gary Raynor, a former IRA arms dealer whom he claims is about to commit one last job before leaving the country for a new life in the Costa Del Crime.
