= 2030 – Aufstand der Alten =

2007 film

- Also known as: 2030 – Rise of the Ancient
- Written by: Jörg Lühdorff
- Directed by: Jörg Lühdorff
- Starring: Bettina Zimmermann; Jürgen Schornagel
- Theme music composer: Oliver Biehler
- Country of origin: Germany
- Original language: German

Production
- Producers: Regina Ziegler; Jasmin Gravenhorst
- Cinematography: Philipp Timme
- Editor: Bernd Euscher
- Running time: 135 minutes

Original release
- Release: 16 January – 23 January 2007

2030 – Aufstand der Alten (2030 – Rise of the Elderly) is a three-part German television miniseries which aired in January 2007. The docudrama, about demographics or "demographic crime", is written and directed by Jörg Lühdorff.

The first part is titled "Die Geiselnahme (Taking a Hostage)", the second is titled "Das Leben im Untergrund (Living in the Underground)", and the third is titled "Das Geheimnis in der Wüste (Tower of the Firstborn)".

== Cast ==
- Bettina Zimmermann: Lena Bach
- Jürgen Schornagel: Sven Darow
