= Suicide Disco =

- Promotional poster
- Directed by: R.A. the Rugged Man
- Written by: R.A. the Rugged Man
- Produced by: R.A. the Rugged Man; Linn Marie Christensen; Oliver Wegner
- Starring: Cameron Bright; Elke Shari Van Den Broeck
- Cinematography: Johan Kuurne
- Music by: R.A. the Rugged Man
- Production company: Thorburn Films Inc.
- Country: United States
- Language: English

Suicide Disco is an upcoming American independent horror film written and directed by R.A. the Rugged Man (in his feature length debut). It stars Cameron Bright and Elke Shari Van Den Broeck.

== Premise ==
A tragic accident changes the lives of two strangers, and they try to overcome their trauma by entering into the most bizarre, disgusting, and twisted relationship imaginable. Their bond takes them to the darkest and most depraved places in human history.

== Cast ==
- Cameron Bright
- Elke Shari Van Den Broeck

== Production ==
In February 2024, it was announced that an independent horror film titled Suicide Disco was in development, with hip-hop artist R.A. the Rugged Man writing the screenplay and making his feature length directorial debut. In May, Cameron Bright and Elke Shari Van Den Broeck were cast in the lead roles. Principal photography began on August 1, 2024.
