= Cameron Bright =

Canadian actor (born 1993)

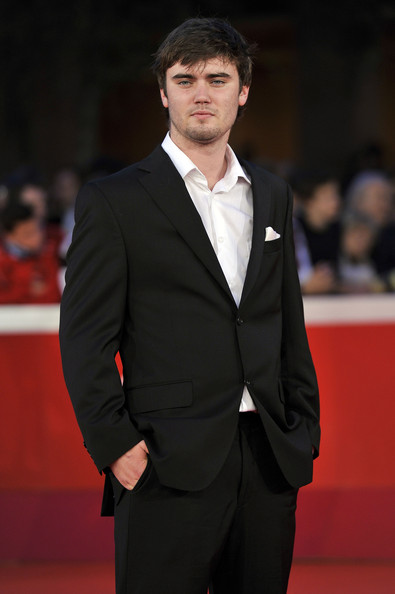
- Bright in 2011
- Born: Cameron Douglas Crigger; January 26, 1993 (age 33); Victoria, British Columbia, Canada
- Other name: Cameron Crigger
- Occupation: Actor
- Years active: 1999–present

Cameron Bright (born Cameron Douglas Crigger; January 26, 1993) is a Canadian actor. He has appeared in the films The Butterfly Effect, Godsend, Birth, Running Scared, Ultraviolet, X-Men: The Last Stand, Thank You for Smoking and three installments of The Twilight Saga.

== Life and career ==
Bright was born in Victoria, British Columbia, the son of Anne Bright and James Crigger. He was given his middle name "Douglas" after his maternal grandfather. His first acting job was in a commercial for Telus, which was soon followed by a guest appearance on the television series Higher Ground. He subsequently appeared in several minor roles in made-for-television films (credited as "Cameron Crigger"), such as the 2000 television movie The Christmas Secret and an episode of Night Visions.

After a supporting part in The Butterfly Effect, Bright's first major role was in Godsend, a horror film co-starring Robert De Niro; the film was released in April 2004 to mixed reviews. In his next film, Birth, he played a ten-year-old boy who claims to be the reincarnation of a woman's (Nicole Kidman) deceased husband. Two scenes within the film sparked controversy and drew media attention to Bright. In one scene, Bright and Kidman's characters kiss; in the other, the two share a bathtub. The actors wore pale beige-coloured swimsuits in the bath scenes and were never naked or filmed together in the same room at the same time of the bathtub scene, although this was not public knowledge at first.

Bright was cast in several Hollywood films released from 2004–2006, including Thank You for Smoking, Ultraviolet, and the action-thriller Running Scared.

He starred in X-Men: The Last Stand, where he played the mutant Leech, who has the mutant antibody. He also appeared on an episode of The 4400 (episode: "The Wrath of Graham") as a high school student named Graham Holt who develops an ability after injecting himself with Promicin. He has also played a host carrier for a cure for humanity in more than one film.

Bright plays the Volturi vampire Alec, twin brother to Jane who is played by Dakota Fanning, in the Twilight films New Moon (2009), Eclipse (2010), and Breaking Dawn, Part II (2012).

== Filmography ==
=== Film ===
| Year | Title | Role | Notes |
|---|---|---|---|
| 2004 | The Butterfly Effect | Tommy (7-years-old) | |
| 2004 | Godsend | Adam Duncan | |
| 2004 | Birth | Young Sean | |
| 2005 | Thank You for Smoking | Joey Naylor | |
| 2006 | Running Scared | Oleg Yugorsky | |
| 2006 | Ultraviolet | Six | |
| 2006 | X-Men: The Last Stand | Jimmy / Leech | |
| 2007 | Juno | RPG Nerd | |
| 2007 | Normal | Brady | |
| 2007 | Christmas in Wonderland | Danny Saunders | |
| 2008 | The Talisman | Jack Sawyer | Short film |
| 2009 | An American Affair | Adam Stafford | |
| 2009 | Walled In | Jimmy | |
| 2009 | The Twilight Saga: New Moon | Alec | |
| 2010 | The Twilight Saga: Eclipse | Alec | |
| 2011 | Little Glory | Shawn | |
| 2012 | The Twilight Saga: Breaking Dawn - Part 2 | Alec | |
| 2013 | Floodplain | Duncan | Short film |
| 2015 | Final Girl | Shane | |
| 2015 | Outside the Lines | DJ | Short film |
| 2016 | Counter Act | | Short film |
| 2017 | Pretty Outrageous | Cameron | |
| 2018 | Beautiful Gun | Jesse | Short film |
| TBA | Suicide Disco | TBA | Post-production |

=== Television ===
| Year | Title | Role | Notes |
|---|---|---|---|
| 2000 | Higher Ground | Young Peter | Episode: "Innocence"; Credited as Cameron Crigger |
| 2000 | The Christmas Secret | Young Jerry | Television film Credited as Cameron Crigger |
| 2002 | Brother's Keeper | Young Ellis | Television film Credited as Cameron Crigger |
| 2002 | Lone Hero | Kid | Television film Credited as Cameron Crigger |
| 2002 | Dark Angel | Johnny | Episode: "She Ain't Heavy"; Credited as Cameron Crigger |
| 2002 | Shadow Realm | Tim | Television film Credited as Cameron Crigger |
| 2002 | Night Visions | Young Tim Malone | Episode: "Voices"; Credited as Cameron Crigger |
| 2005–06 | Stargate SG-1 | Orlin | Episodes: "The Fourth Horseman: Parts 1 & 2" |
| 2007 | The 4400 | Graham Holt | Episode: "The Wrath of Graham" |
| 2011 | Earth's Final Hours | Andy Streich | Television film |
| 2012 | Goodnight for Justice: The Measure of a Man | Will | Television film |
| 2013–14, 2016 | Motive | Manny Flynn | 9 episodes |

=== Music videos ===
| Year | Title | Artist |
|---|---|---|
| 2013 | Beach Dream | Jets Overhead |

== Awards and nominations ==
| Award | Year | Category | Work | Result | Ref. |
|---|---|---|---|---|---|
| Critics' Choice Movie Award | 2005 | Best Young Actor | Birth | Nominated | |
| Critics' Choice Movie Award | 2007 | Best Young Actor | Thank You for Smoking | Nominated | |
| Leo Awards | 2008 | Best Supporting Performance by a Male in a Feature Length Drama | Normal | Nominated | |
| Leo Awards | 2019 | Best Performance by a Male in a Short Drama | Beautiful Gun | Nominated | |
| Young Artist Award | 2005 | Best Supporting Young Actor in a Feature Film | Birth | Nominated | |
| Young Artist Award | 2007 | Best Supporting Young Actor in a Feature Film | X-Men: The Last Stand | Nominated | |
| Young Artist Award | 2007 | Best Leading Young Actor in a Feature Film | Running Scared | Nominated | |
| Young Artist Award | 2008 | Best Performance in a TV Series - Guest Starring Young Actor | The 4400 ("Wrath of Graham") | Nominated | |
