= Christoph Schrewe =

German film director (born 1964)

- Born: August 19, 1964 (age 61); Stuttgart, West Germany
- Occupation: Film director
- Years active: 1989–present

Christoph Schrewe (born August 19, 1964) is a German film director.

Schrewe began his career directing television films in Germany. In 2004 he directed his first international feature film, Post Impact, followed by the well-received The Conclave in 2006.

In 2008, he directed a mini-series adaptation of Jack London's novel The Sea Wolf, a ProSieben production filmed on location on Grand Bahama Island.

More recently his international credits include 12 episodes of Borgia, as well as multiple episodes of Versailles, Criminal Minds, Berlin Station, Britannia, Shooter and ‘’City on a Hill’’. Also the fifteenth episode of The Purge entitled "House of Mirrors."

== Selected filmography ==
- Post Impact (2004)
- The Conclave (2006)
- The Sea Wolf (2008)
- Borgia (2011–2014, TV series, 12 episodes)
