= Godsend (2004 film) =

2004 horror film by Nick Hamm

- Theatrical release poster
- Directed by: Nick Hamm
- Written by: Mark Bomback
- Produced by: Marc Butan; Sean O’Keefe; Cathy Schulman; Mark Canton
- Starring: Greg Kinnear; Rebecca Romijn; Robert De Niro; Cameron Bright
- Cinematography: Kramer Morgenthau
- Edited by: Niven Howie; Steve Mirkovich
- Music by: Brian Tyler
- Production companies: 2929 Entertainment; Atmosphere Pictures
- Distributed by: Lions Gate Films
- Release date: April 30, 2004
- Running time: 102 minutes
- Countries: United States; Canada
- Language: English
- Budget: $25 million
- Box office: $30 million

Godsend is a 2004 psychological horror thriller film starring Greg Kinnear, Rebecca Romijn and Robert De Niro, and directed by Nick Hamm from a screenplay by Mark Bomback. The plot follows a couple (Kinnear and Romijn) who are approached by an enigmatic doctor (De Niro) who offers to clone their deceased son. The film was released on April 30, 2004, by Lions Gate Films to a critical and commercial failure.

== Plot ==
Paul and Jessie Duncan are a happily married couple who have an eight-year-old son named Adam. The day after his eighth birthday, when fetching a basketball into the street, Adam is killed in a collision.

While leaving a church, Jessie and Paul are confronted by Dr. Richard Wells, an old professor of Jessie's. He offers to clone Adam, an illegal procedure that would require a change of location and identity, to which the Duncans reluctantly agree.

Everything appears to be fine with the new Adam until he reaches his eighth birthday. That night, he experiences a violent nightmare. Richard explains to Paul that it is typical for boys of his age to have night terrors, and that it is not serious. He explains that because Adam II has reached the age at which the original Adam died, his life cannot be predicted anymore. From that moment, Adam II continues to have night terrors until they become visions. He starts having the visions while he is awake, and he loses control of his actions.

Adam's visions are recurrent: he witnesses a boy named Zachary walking in a school building while being laughed at by other children. These images alternate with images of the school burning and children screaming, as well as the image of an unidentified woman being attacked and killed with a hammer. His visions affect his daytime personality, making him bitter, delinquent, and uncooperative.

Adam begins to bully another boy who goes to his school. One night at dinner, Jessie receives a telephone call from the parent of the boy, distressed that he is missing. Jessie tells Paul, who asks Adam what he did that day. Adam says that he was playing at the river. When Paul asks with whom he was playing, Adam responds by saying that he is "not supposed to say".

The following day, as the Duncans are driving home over a bridge, they are stopped by a police officer. They walk to the side of the bridge to see the woman who had telephoned the previous night about her missing child, screaming at the sight of her drowned son being retrieved by paramedics from the river. Paul believes that Adam was involved with the child's death.

With Richard's help, Paul examines Adam and talks to him about his visions. He finally learns that the school in Adam's visions is called Saint Pius, and that Zachary's last name is Clark. With this information, Paul is able to track down the child's address and find a former nanny of Zachary. The nanny informs Paul that Zachary was deeply disturbed. He was bullied at school tremendously, and in the wake of his emotions, he set fire to the school.

When he returned home, Zachary killed his mother with a hammer before setting fire to their house, where he burned to death with his mother’s body. When Paul asks the nanny, he learns that Zachary's father was a geneticist—enough information to uncover that this man was Richard Wells, now living under a false identity.

Through the operation to clone Adam, Richard had secretly mixed Adam's DNA with that of Zachary's (as the fire damaged Zachary's DNA to the point at which it could not be cloned without the assistance of other living cells), with the hope of bringing his own son back to life, then kidnapping him. The operation did not yield a complete success.

After arguing with Richard and learning what has caused Adam's erratic behavior, Paul races home. He finds Adam and Jessie in the shed in the woods. He has arrived in time to stop Adam (with Zachary's personality in control) from killing Jessie with a hammer in nearly the same way as Zachary had killed his mother. Adam's personality manages to regain control, and everything seems to be okay.

In an attempt to shake the psychological transitions from Adam to Zachary, the Duncans escape from Richard and move to a different neighborhood. All seems well. Adam is friendly and happy, but as he is alone in his room, Adam hears a noise in the closet. When he opens the closet door, a slightly burnt and decayed arm wearing Zachary’s jersey reaches out of the darkness and pulls Adam in. Paul returns to check on Adam and looks in the closet, but he does not see anyone. Adam appears from behind and shocks Paul by touching him, indicating that Zachary has regained control.

== Cast ==
- Greg Kinnear as Paul Duncan
- Rebecca Romijn as Jessie Duncan
- Robert De Niro as Richard Wells
- Cameron Bright as Adam Duncan
- Janet Bailey as Cora Williams
- Christopher Britton as Dr. Lieber
- Jake Simons as Dan Sandler
- Elle Downs as Clara Sandler
- Zoie Palmer as Susan Pierce
- Devon Bostick as Zachary Clark Wells
- Munro Chambers as Max Shaw

== Production ==
In October 2001, it was announced that Nick Hamm had been hired to direct Godsend. In September 2002, Robert De Niro was cast.

The filmmakers included a scene from the 1977 Robert Wise film Audrey Rose, a film with a similar plot. This scene was included in one of the night terrors.

=== Marketing ===
As a part of the film's promotional campaign, Lions Gate set up a website for the fictional Godsend Institute in the film, which claimed to be able to resurrect the dead. Lions Gate changed the website to inform people that it was only an advertisement, due to the large number of inquiries asking if they really resurrect dead family members.

== Reception ==
=== Critical response ===
The film was poorly received by critics, receiving 3%, based on 136 reviews on Rotten Tomatoes, and is noted for implausible plot devices. Metacritic gave the film 24%, based on 32 reviews by select critics, judging that it has received "generally unfavorable" reviews. Audiences polled by CinemaScore gave the film an average grade of "D+" on an A+ to F scale.

Roger Ebert of the Chicago Sun-Times awarded the film two stars out of four.

Independent critic Leonard Maltin awarded the film two-and-a-half stars.

=== Box office ===
The film made $6,800,617 in its opening weekend, ranking fourth. It went on to earn $14,379,751 domestically and $30,114,487 worldwide, against a budget of $25 million.
