= Wester-Ohrstedt =

Wester-Ohrstedt Vester Ørsted
- Municipality
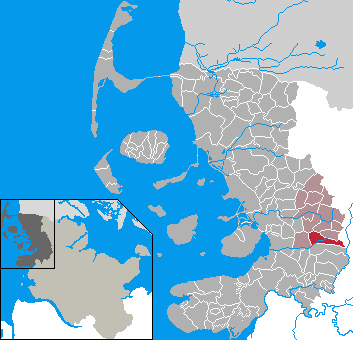
- Location of Wester-Ohrstedt; Vester Ørsted within Nordfriesland district
- Interactive map of Wester-Ohrstedt; Vester Ørsted
- Location within Germany Location within Schleswig-Holstein
- Coordinates: 54°31′N 9°10′E
- Country: Germany
- State: Schleswig-Holstein
- District: Nordfriesland
- Municipal assoc.: Viöl

Government
  - Mayor: Stefan Timm

Area
  - Total: 18.54 km^{2} (7.16 sq mi)
- Elevation: 26 m (85 ft)

Population (2025-12-31)
  - Total: 1,085
  - Density: 58.52/km^{2} (151.6/sq mi)
- Time zone: UTC+01:00 (CET)
  - Summer (DST): UTC+02:00 (CEST)
- Postal codes: 25885
- Dialling codes: 04847
- Vehicle registration: NF
- Website: www.amt-vioel.de

Wester-Ohrstedt (Danish: Vester Ørsted) is a municipality in the district of Nordfriesland, in Schleswig-Holstein, Germany.
