= Bettina Zimmermann =

German model and actress (born 1975)

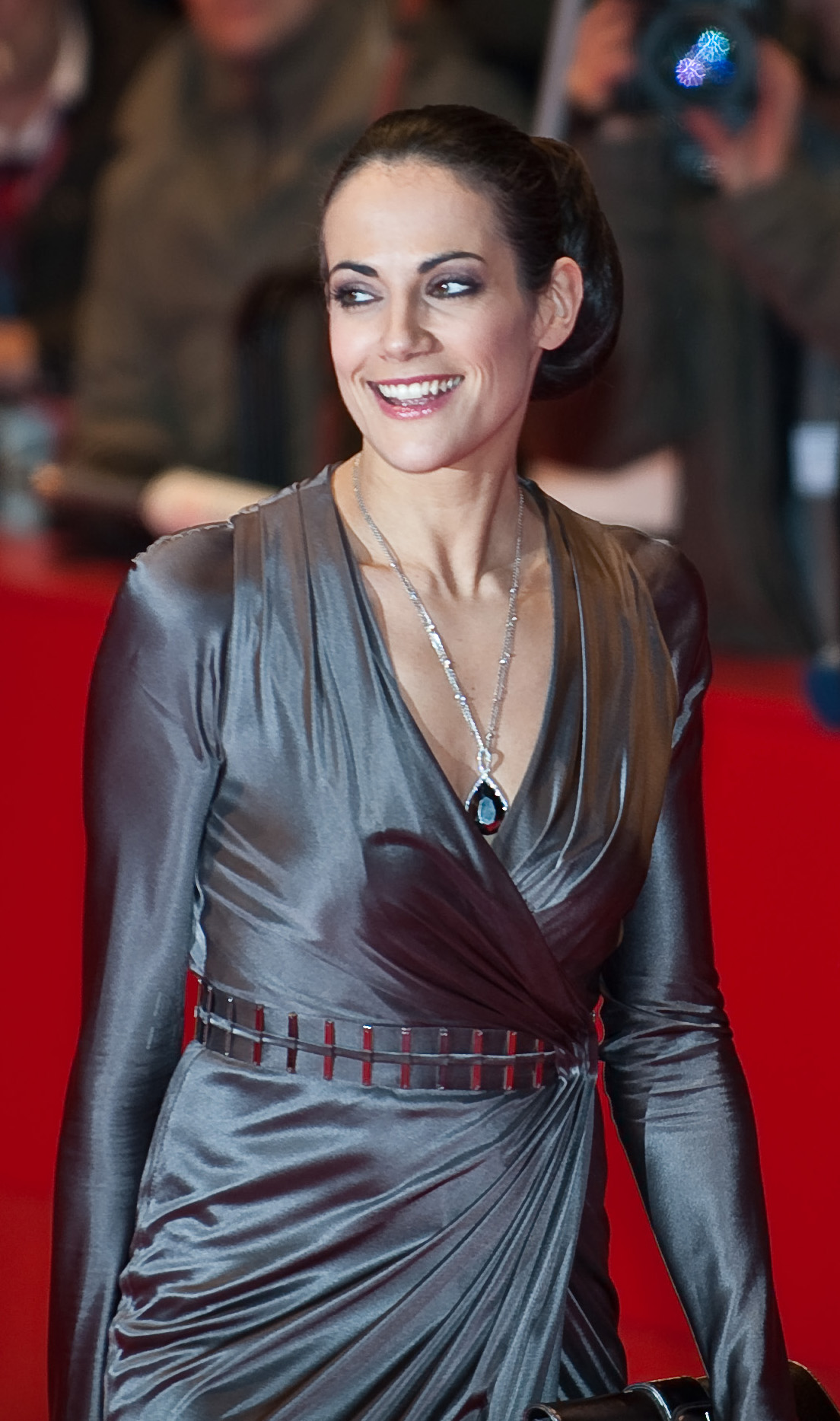
- Born: 31 March 1975 (age 51); Großburgwedel, West Germany
- Occupation: Actress
- Years active: 1999-present

Bettina Zimmermann (born 31 March 1975) is a German model and actress. She has appeared in more than sixty films since 1999.

== Selected filmography ==
Year	Title	Role	Notes
2002	Seven Moves to Checkmate	Jill Mohnhaupt	TV film
2004	Post Impact	Anna Starndorf	
2005	The Airlift	Luise Kielberg	TV film
2007	2030 – Aufstand der Alten	Lena Bach	TV film
2008	Mordshunger	Eva Feldkamp	TV film
2008	The Charlemagne Code	Katharina	TV film
2008	Lost City Raiders	Giovanna Becker	TV film
2010	Spear of Destiny	Katharina	TV film
2010	2030 – Aufstand der Jungen	Lena Bach	TV film
2011	The Seduction: The Strange Girl	Viktoria Vogt	TV film
2011	Bermuda-Triangle North Sea	Marie Niklas	TV film
2012	The Hunt for the Amber Room	Katharina	TV film
