= Adrienne McQueen =

German actress

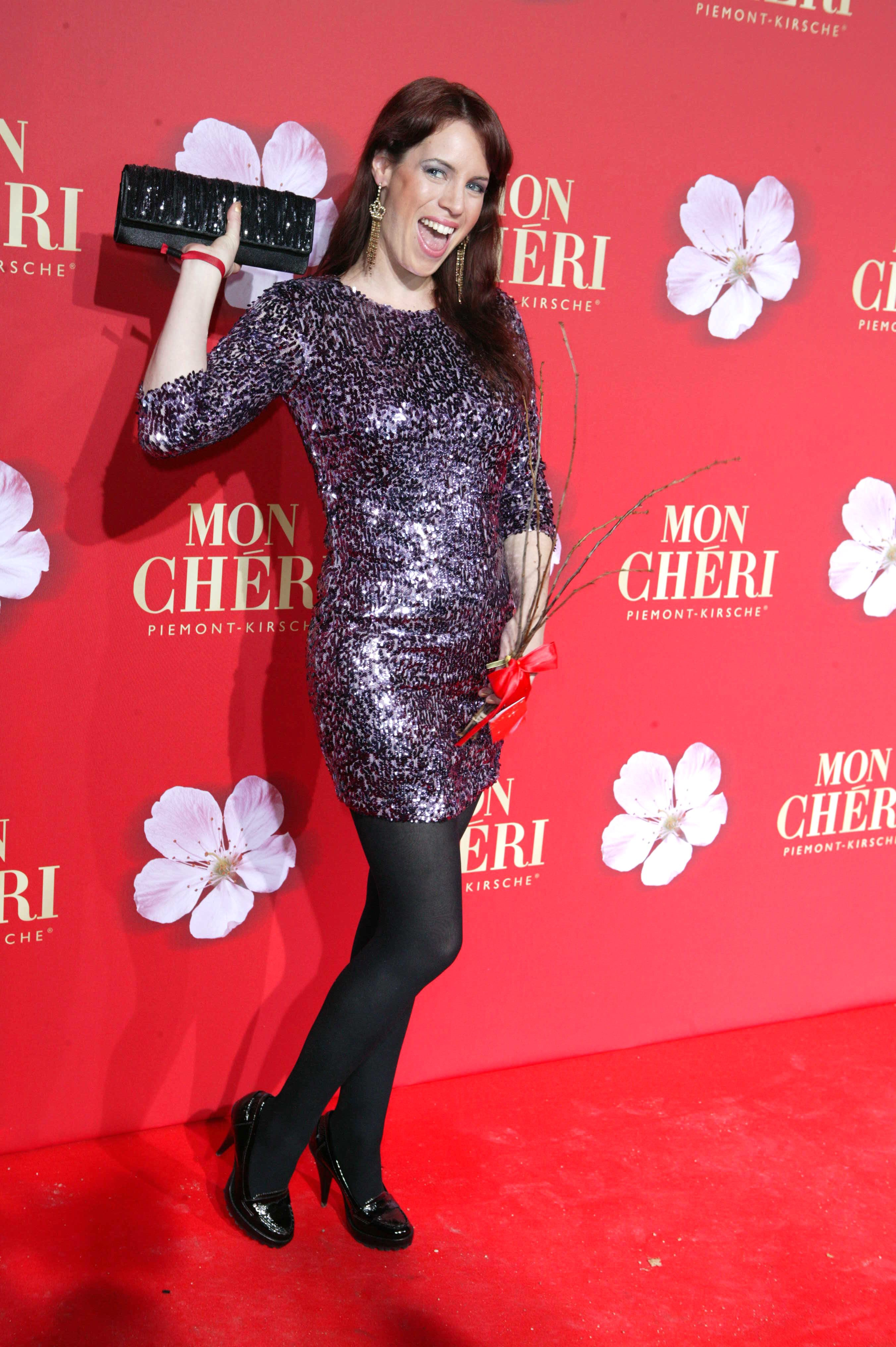
- Born: June 16, 1983 (age 42); Frankfurt am Main, Germany
- Occupations: Actress, producer
- Years active: 2002–present

Adrienne McQueen (born June 16, 1983) is a German-American actress.

== Early life and education ==
McQueen was born in Frankfurt, West Germany./> She studied classical ballet from the age of six under the Royal Academy of Dance syllabus before adding vocal tuition with German opera coach Gabrielle Fuchs.

In 1998 she joined the English Theatre Frankfurt for two seasons and subsequently relocated to the United States, graduating from the Stella Adler Academy of Acting in Los Angeles in 2004.

== Career ==
While still in training McQueen won the 2004 European Musical Voice Award, which led to regional German stage engagements in Hair and A Doll's House.

Hollywood casting directors later selected her for a club-dancer cameo in Fast & Furious and for a party-guest role in Steven Soderbergh’s Magic Mike (2012).

Since 2010 McQueen has alternated film assignments with recurring television parts, including the sales-department head in the Netflix series Skylines (2019) and Janine in the German revival of X-Factor: Das Unfassbare (2022–2023).

Traveling between Europe and America she landed various roles in TV movies, co-starring next to Dean Cain and David Keith amongst others.

Attending the Cannes Film Festival she was discovered by German director Uwe Boll to act in his film BloodRayne alongside Michael Madsen, Michelle Rodriguez, Ben Kingsley, and Meat Loaf.

She also starred in the horror film Brotherhood of Blood directed by Michael Roesch and Peter Scherer and was directed by Joaquin Phoenix in a music video for the band Ringside.

She is also a screenwriter and creative producer for feature films.

== Family ==
Her mother is the German painter Marion Jansen-Baisch. She grew up in Europe, in England, Austria, Italy, and Germany. She won the European Musical Voice Award of the year for Austria. Which is the Austrian equivalent to American idol. She has recorded and performed original music but also cover songs all over the world.
