= Ultraviolet (film) =

2006 film by Kurt Wimmer

- Theatrical release poster
- Directed by: Kurt Wimmer
- Written by: Kurt Wimmer
- Produced by: John Baldecchi
- Starring: Milla Jovovich; Cameron Bright; Nick Chinlund; William Fichtner
- Cinematography: Arthur Wong
- Edited by: William Yeh
- Music by: Klaus Badelt
- Production companies: Screen Gems; Ultravi Productions
- Distributed by: Sony Pictures Releasing
- Release date: March 3, 2006
- Running time: 87 minutes
- Country: United States
- Language: English
- Budget: $30 million
- Box office: $31.1 million

Ultraviolet is a 2006 American science fiction action film written and directed by Kurt Wimmer and produced by Screen Gems. The film stars Milla Jovovich as Violet Song, Cameron Bright as Six, and Nick Chinlund as Ferdinand Daxus.

Violet Song Jat Shariff, a woman infected with hemoglophagia (a condition that introduces vampire-like symptoms), lives in a future dystopia where anyone infected with the contagious disease is immediately sentenced to death. With her advanced martial arts skills, a group of rebel hemophages, and a boy named Six, whose blood may contain a cure for the disease, Violet goes on a mission to overthrow the futuristic government and defeat Ferdinand Daxus.

A novelization of the film was written by Yvonne Navarro, with more back-story and character development. The book differs from the film in a number of ways, including a more ambiguous ending and the removal of some of the plot twists. An anime series titled Ultraviolet: Code 044 was released by the Japanese anime satellite television network Animax, and created by Madhouse.

It was released in North America on March 3, 2006, and was a critical and commercial failure. The film was released on DVD and Blu-ray Disc on June 27, 2006.

== Plot ==
In the mid-21st century, an accident occurs in an illegal U.S. biotechnological laboratory, where they tried to create super-soldiers to subjugate and exterminate the third world, but the project goes horribly wrong. As a result, part of the Earth's population becomes infected with a virus that overwrites and replaces DNA, mutating into hemophages, creatures with vampire fangs that are stronger, faster and smarter than humans, but have very short lifespans due to genetic unravelling.

Humanity starts a war against the hemophages, and they subsequently go underground. As law enforcement agencies are unable to stop the infection, sovereign nations collapse, human rights are abolished, and due to the state of emergency on the planet, the remaining governments, having slid into fascism, establish the ArchMinistry, a powerful corporation and joint world government that usurps the United Nations and World Health Organization. Hemophage supersoldier Violet Jat Shariff is part of the rebel resistance underground, looking for ways to fight back.

Violet is tasked with stealing supposedly human-made anti-mutant weapons. Using her superpowers, she attacks the center ("Blood Bank"), where a superweapon is hidden that can destroy hemophages. However, the 9-year-old boy Six turns out to be in the weapons container – a clone of Vice Cardinal Ferdinand Daxus (who was appointed President of Earth) and a carrier of a virus dangerous for hemophages. Violet delivers the boy to the base, but, in a fit of sentimentality, prevents him from being killed by the hemophages.

Violet and her allies plan to create a vaccine that would return her and the hemophages to the human world, but the vice-cardinal's special forces and the hemophages are after her. It is revealed that the majority of hemophages have decided to collude with the vice-cardinal, who himself turns out to be a secret hemophage. In the resistance labs, Violet learns that Six does not pose a danger to the hemophages, but for the vice-cardinal he has a mysterious value. Violet eventually learns that Daxus wants to increase his wealth through a new epidemic, an antidote for which people will need to buy daily. Six is the key to these insidious designs. She later finds out that it was Daxus who once worked as a laboratory assistant and deliberately arranged an accident in the laboratory in order to subsequently take advantage of the situation to lead the world government. Violet goes through multiple battles, rescuing Six and reviving him as a hemophage, before managing to kill Daxus. Violet swears to protect the world from the hatred in society as she and Six ride off into the sunset.

== Cast ==
- Milla Jovovich as Violet Song Jat Shariff
  - Ida Martin as young Violet
- Cameron Bright as Six
- Nick Chinlund as Vice-Cardinal Ferdinand Daxus
  - Steven Calcote as young Daxus
- William Fichtner as Garth
- Scott Piper as Garth's assistant
- Sebastien Andrieu as Nerva
- Christopher Garner as Luthor
- Ricardo Mamood-Vega as Song Jat Shariff
- Katarína Jancula as Shariff's new wife (extended cut)
- Jennifer Caputo as Elizabeth P. Watkins
- Duc Luu as Kar Waia
- Kieran O'Rorke as Detective Cross
- Ryan Martin as Detective Breeder
- Digger Mesch as Detective Endera
- Kurt Wimmer (cameo) as Hemophage
- Richard Jackson as Archministry Computer Tech
- Mary Catherine Williams as Purple-haired shopper (extended cut)

== Production ==
Scene featuring Six (Cameron Bright) underneath the Oriental Pearl Tower in Shanghai, China.

In March 2003, it was reported Screen Gems had acquired worldwide distribution rights to Ultraviolet to be written and directed by Kurt Wimmer with the company having been impressed by Wimmer's previous directorial effort Equilibrium. In May of that year, it was reported Milla Jovovich had signed on to play the lead role in the film with Wimmer stating he had actually written the role with her in mind after seeing her performance in Resident Evil.

Production began in early February 2004, and was shot in various cities across China, most notably Hong Kong and Shanghai. Production was finished in late June 2004. The film was shot digitally on high-definition video, using a Sony HDW-F900.

In 2004, the film's trailer was leaked on the internet. Director Wimmer then visited several message boards and demanded all clips be removed in order to keep the film's plot a secret. It uses "Clubbed to Death (Kurayamino Edition)" by Rob Dougan as the soundtrack, as well as "24" by Jem.

Jovovich was not pleased with the film, having been locked out of the editing process, despite promises to include her input on her performance.

== Reception ==
=== Critical response ===
On the review aggregator website Rotten Tomatoes, 9% of 81 critics' reviews are positive, with an average rating of 3/10. The website's consensus reads: "An incomprehensible and forgettable sci-fi thriller, Ultraviolet is inept in every regard." Metacritic, which uses a weighted average, assigned the film a score of 18 out of 100, based on 19 critics, indicating "overwhelming dislike". Audiences surveyed by CinemaScore gave the film a grade of "D+" on scale of A to F.

Frank Scheck of The Hollywood Reporter called it "The latest entry in the 'This film is so bad we're not screening it for critics' genre." He also criticized the action scenes: "Although extravagantly staged, they're more than a little derivative" and "other sequences are rather more ridiculous". Robert Koehler of Variety wrote, "Pic is hermetically sealed in a synthetic wrapping that's so total – Sony's top-flight high-def cameras, visibly low-budget CG work, exceptionally hackneyed and imitative action and dialogue – that it arrives a nearly lifeless film."

=== Box office ===
Ultraviolet was released in North America on March 3, 2006. The film grossed $9,064,880 in its opening weekend in fourth place. It grossed $18,535,812 domestically and $12,534,399 internationally, which brings the worldwide total of $31,070,211. With a budget of $30 million, the film was a box-office failure.

== Home media ==
The film was released on DVD and Blu-ray on June 27, 2006, in North America. There are two versions of the film, an unrated version (94 minutes long) and a PG-13 version (88 minutes long). Additionally, the rough cut of the movie was originally close to two hours long; only six minutes of this lost half-hour were restored for the unrated cut. The North American, European, South American, Hong Kong and Korean Blu-ray is the PG-13 version of the film. This is because Sony previously would not allow unrated or NC-17 content to be released on the then-new Blu-ray format, a clause which has since been lifted. However, the Japanese Blu-ray that was released on January 1, 2007, does contain the 94 minute unrated version of the film, along with all the extras that appeared on the DVD, excluding a few trailers. The film performed quite well in the DVD market, grossing over $35.1 million in rental sales. In the end, Ultraviolet turned a healthy profit of over $36 million.

The DVD includes a four-part documentary: "UV Protection: The Making of Ultraviolet", and an audio commentary with Jovovich. Some editions additionally feature some deleted scenes which were cut from the final release, but not all footage from the unrated extended edition was included among the deleted scenes.

== See also ==
- Gun Kata – a fictional martial art used in Equilibrium and Ultraviolet
- List of dystopian films
