= Displaced (2006 film) =

- Displaced US DVD artwork
- Directed by: Martin Holland
- Screenplay by: Martin Holland
- Story by: Carol Anne Strange
- Produced by: Mark Strange
- Starring: Mark Strange; Malcolm Hankey; Graham Brownsmith; Stephanie Fend; Cathy Miller; Ian McKellen
- Edited by: Martin Holland
- Music by: Paul King
- Production company: Skylandian Entertainment
- Distributed by: Silverline Entertainment
- Release date: 2006
- Running time: 100 minutes
- Country: United Kingdom
- Language: English

Displaced is a 2006 British feature film produced by Skylandian Pictures. Produced by Mark Strange and directed by Martin Holland, the film took six years to make and secured a US distribution deal with Silverline Entertainment at the end of 2005.

== Plot ==
Stel, a humanoid alien, teams up with British soldier John Marrettie to search for a top secret file which contains information about advanced energy production, captured alien spacecraft and the extraterrestrial pilots. The missing include Stel's father, Arakawa, was shot down and imprisoned by Core – a paramilitary group.

The Displaced file is being held by a renegade 'special forces’ leader, Wilson, who plans to sell the information on the black market to the highest bidder. Marrettie is forced to help Stel in the search to locate the file.

== Cast ==
- Mark Strange as Stel
- Malcolm Hankey as John Marrettie
- Graham Brownsmith as Wilson
- Stephanie Fend as Sienna
- Cathy Miller as Cathy Miller
- Stephanie Renke as Usan
- Ian McKellen as voice
- Les Froth
