= Poesia marginal =

Poetry produced in opposition to Brazil's military dictatorship

Poesia marginal (lit. 'Marginal poetry') is a manifestation of (mostly) youth poetry produced in the Brazil from around 1970 to 1985. It appeared, principally in Rio de Janeiro, immediately after Tropicália during the early 1970s, in opposition to academic restrictions and against the censorship imposed by the Brazil's military dictatorship from 1964.

Anti-normative intellectuals, new academics, and various poets and visual artists throughout the country began to seek alternative means of cultural dissemination in the face of closed cultural opportunities. Poets notably used the mimeograph machine to print texts. This technology led to the nickname "Mimeograph Generation" for the out-of-the-mainstream poets of the time. The "marginal" movement has interested scholars more as a socio-cultural phenomenon than as an aesthetic project per se. The poetry groups had links with the other arts—music, theater, cinema—and extended, through other media, through the 1980s and even 1990s. As a result of being produced and distributed through a supply chain and being passed from person to person, as the Samizdat was in the Soviet bloc, the poetry produced by the mimeograph generation was called "marginal".

Some important names in this period were Torquato Neto, Cacaso, Ana Cristina Cesar, Waly Salomão, filmmaker Glauber Rocha, Paulo Leminski, songwriter Caetano Veloso, artist Lygia Clark and artist Hélio Oiticica.

In 1975, a book titled 26 Poetas Hoje (26 Poets Today) was published, edited by Heloísa Buarque de Hollanda. The poets of the "Mimeograph Generation" included in this collection were:

- Francisco Alvim
- Carlos Saldanha
- Antônio Carlos de Brito
- Roberto Piva
- Torquato Neto
- José Carlos Capinan
- Roberto Schwarz
- Zulmira Ribeiro Tavares
- Afonso Henriques Neto
- Vera Pedrosa
- Antonio Carlos Secchin
- Flávio Aguiar
- Ana Cristina Cesar
- Geraldo Eduardo Carneiro
- João Carlos Pádua
- Luiz Olavo Fontes
- Eudoro Augusto
- Waly Salomão
- Ricardo G. Ramos
- Leomar Fróes
- Isabel Câmara
- Chacal
- Charles
- Bernardo Vilhena
- Leila Míccolis
- Adauto de Souza Santos
