= Charly Chiarelli =

Canadian writer, storyteller, actor and musician

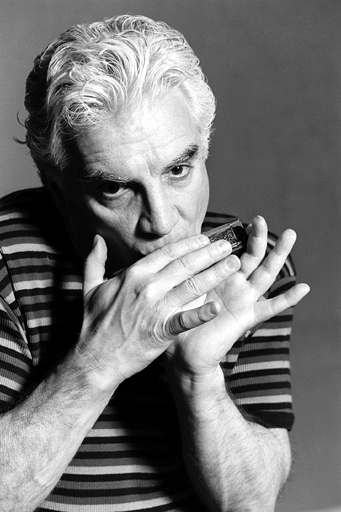
- Charly performing in his play Cu'Fu
- Born: Calogero Chiarelli; October 2, 1948 (age 77); Racalmuto, Sicily, Italy
- Education: Master's degree in Social Work from Carleton University; also degrees in Psychology from McMaster University and Linguistics from the University of Toronto
- Writing career
- Notable works: Cu'Fu; Mangiacake; Brutta Figura; Road to the Lemon Grove;
- Website: www.charlyentertainment.com

Calogero (Charly) Chiarelli (born October 2, 1948) is a Canadian writer, storyteller, actor and musician.

Born in Racalmuto, Sicily, Chiarelli grew up in the industrial north end of Hamilton, Ontario. He has a Master's degree in Social Work from Carleton University; also degrees in Psychology from McMaster University and Linguistics from the University of Toronto.

As a writer, storyteller and virtuoso harmonica player Charly Chiarelli is well known for his one-person plays, most notably Cu'Fu, Mangiacake, Brutta Figura and Sunamabeach directed for theatre by Ronald Weihs. A filmed performance of Cu'Fu, Mangiacake and Brutta Figura directed by Gemini Award winner, Dennis Beauchamp, were first aired on May 31, 2000 on Bravo! and has been re-aired periodically. He co-wrote and starred in the 2019 film Road to the Lemon Grove with Burt Young, Nick Mancuso, Rossella Brescia, Loreena McKennitt and Tomaso Sanelli. Chiarelli was inducted in 2003 into the McMaster University Alumni Gallery that includes inductee notables like Martin Short, Dave Thomas and Eugene Levy. As a Jazz and Blues harmonica player Chiarelli has contributed to recordings and live performances as well as creating his own musical works.
