= Folk Songs (Charlie Haden album) =

Studio album by Charlie Haden
- Released: February 1981
- Recorded: November 1979
- Studio: Talent Studio; Oslo, Norway
- Genre: Jazz
- Length: 45:25
- Label: ECM 1170
- Producer: Manfred Eicher

Charlie Haden chronology
Magico (1980)	Folk Songs (1981)	Time Remembers One Time Once (1983)

Jan Garbarek chronology
Aftenland (1980)	Folk Songs (1981)	Eventyr (1981)

Egberto Gismonti chronology
Circense (1980)	Folk Songs (1981)	Sanfona (1981)

Folk Songs is an album by bassist Charlie Haden, recorded in November 1979 and released on ECM in February 1981—the second album by the trio, featuring saxophonist Jan Garbarek and guitarist Egberto Gismonti, following Mágico (1980).

== Reception ==
The AllMusic review by Scott Yanow stated: "One of the better ECM recordings... filled with moody originals, improvisations that blend together jazz and world music, and atmospheric ensembles. This date works well both as superior background music and for close listening."

Professional ratings
Review scores
Source	Rating
AllMusic	4/5 stars
The Penguin Guide to Jazz Recordings	3.5/4 stars
The Rolling Stone Jazz Record Guide	3/5 stars

== Track listing ==
1. "Folk Song" (Traditional) – 8:12
2. "Bôdas de Prata" (Egberto Gismonti, Geraldo Carneiro) – 4:44
3. "Cego Aderaldo" (Gismonti) – 7:54
4. "Veien" (Jan Garbarek) – 7:50
5. "Equilibrista" (Gismonti) – 8:36
6. "For Turiya" (Charlie Haden) – 7:42

== Personnel ==
- Charlie Haden – bass
- Jan Garbarek – soprano saxophone, tenor saxophone
- Egberto Gismonti – guitar, piano
