= Duas vozes =

Studio album by Egberto Gismonti & Naná Vasconcelos
- Released: 1985
- Recorded: June 1984
- Studio: Rainbow Studio; Oslo, Norway
- Genre: Jazz
- Length: 48:05
- Label: ECM 1279
- Producer: Manfred Eicher

Egberto Gismonti & Naná Vasconcelos chronology
Dança das cabeças (1977)	Duas vozes (1985)

Egberto Gismonti chronology
Egberto Gismondi & Hermeto Pascoal (1983)	Duas vozes (1985)	Trem Caipira (1985)

Duas vozes (Portuguese: "Two Voices") is the second album by Brazilian jazz duo Egberto Gismonti and Naná Vasconcelos recorded in 1984 and released in 1985 on ECM the following year.

== Reception ==
The AllMusic review by Alvaro Neder awarded the album 4½ stars stating "Egberto is very fond of percussive attacks and ethereal configurations, both acquiring superior importance in his music, not being necessarily attached to or supportive for a musical theme or melody".

Professional ratings
Review scores
Source	Rating
Allmusic	4.5/5 stars

== Track listing ==
All compositions by Egberto Gismonti except as indicated

1. "Aquarela do Brasil" (Ary Barroso) – 6:01
2. "Rio de Janeiro" – 6:27
3. "Tomarapeba" (Traditional) – 3:42
4. "Dancando" – 7:55
5. "Fogueira" – 5:52
6. "Bianca" – 6:41
7. "Don Quixote" (G. E. Carneiro, Gismonti) – 7:41
8. "O dia, à noite" (Naná Vasconcelos) – 3:52

== Personnel ==
- Egberto Gismonti – guitar, piano, dilruba, wood flutes, voice
- Naná Vasconcelos – percussion, berimbau, voice
