= Dança dos Escravos =

Dança dos escravos

Studio album by Egberto Gismonti
- Released: 1989
- Recorded: November 1988
- Genre: Jazz
- Length: 46:35
- Label: ECM
- Producer: Manfred Eicher

Egberto Gismonti chronology
Pagador de promessas (1988)	Dança dos escravos (1989)	In Montreal (1989)

Dança dos escravos (Portuguese for "Dance of the Slaves") is a solo album by Brazilian composer and guitarist Egberto Gismonti recorded in 1988 and released on the ECM label.

== Reception ==
The Allmusic review awarded the album 4½ stars.

Professional ratings
Review scores
Source	Rating
Allmusic	4.5/5 stars

== Track listing ==
All compositions by Egberto Gismonti except as indicated:

1. 2 violões – 5:58
2. Lundu – 6:30
3. Trenzinho do caipira (Heitor Villa-Lobos) – 7:18
4. Alegrinho – 3:44
5. Dança dos escravos – 14:58
6. Salvador – 4:45
7. Memória e fado – 3:22

== Personnel ==
- Egberto Gismonti – guitar
