= Nayab Midha =

Musical artist

Nayab Midha (born September 13, 1996) in Sri Ganganagar, Rajasthan. She is an Indian spoken-word poet, storyteller, and digital content creator who writes primarily in Hindi. Her performances frequently address themes of romantic relationships, personal identity, and modern womanhood. She is among the early female spoken-word artists in India to attain over one million followers on Instagram. Her notable works include "Muskurao", "Tum Khoobsurat Ho", and "Nani Ki Kahani", which she has performed live and distributed on digital platforms. Her additional works include "Aadat & Baatein Karlo", "Dosti he Pyaar Hai", and "Rajkumari".

She is also known as the female Zakir Khan.

== Early life and education ==
Nayab completed her schooling in Sri Ganganagar before moving to Delhi to pursue higher education. She earned a degree in engineering from Bhagwan Parshuram Institute of Technology (BPIT), affiliated with Guru Gobind Singh Indraprastha University. Following her graduation, she worked at Infosys for two years before pursuing a full-time career in poetry. After working at Infosys for two years, Midha left the corporate sector, citing a desire to pursue poetry as a career. Poetry, which had been part of her life since school, subsequently became her primary pursuit.

Her first public poetry recitation occurred in her hometown during protests following the Nirbhaya case, where she recited her work using a loudspeaker mounted on a rickshaw.

== Career ==
She began writing poetry in school, composing her first poem in the ninth grade for a creative writing competition. She later described her entry into writing as a natural progression, viewing poetry as an integral part of her personal expression.

During her university studies, she began performing at slam poetry competitions across several colleges in Delhi, including Gargi College, Shaheed Bhagat Singh College, Shri Ram College of Commerce, and Delhi Technological University. She also won top honors, including gold and silver awards, at Anugoonj, Guru Gobind Singh Indraprastha University's annual cultural festival.

Moreover, she performed a live poetry and storytelling program titled "The Nayab Show". She has achieved significant popularity on digital platforms, becoming one of the prominent female spoken word artists in India with a wide social media following.

On May 24, 2026, she launched her India tour, Rajkumari, which reinterprets traditional fairy tales to explore themes of female independence and self-reliance. On May 23, she performed live in Hyderabad.

Midha performed her spoken word production, Rajkumari, as part of a 22-city national tour across India, which included a performance at the MLR Convention Centre in Bengaluru in June 2026. Rajkumari explores themes surrounding women's societal expectations and traditional fairytales. Internationally, the production has been staged across the UK, Europe, Australia, and New Zealand.

In September 2026, she released the official single "Rajkumari - The Nayab Song" as part of her Rajkumari spoken word project. The bilingual track, featuring vocals by Shruti Dhasmana and written by Rajat Sood, addresses themes of female empowerment, financial independence, and identity. The release followed her multi-city Rajkumari India Tour, which included a performance at Talkatora in New Delhi.

== Personal Life ==
Nayab's grandparents relocated to Sri Ganganagar following the partition of India.

Nayab was born to Rajkumar and Babita Midha and grew up alongside her younger brother, Yuvraj.

On November 2, 2025, she married software developer Ayush Chandhok in Udaipur, Rajasthan.

In February 2026, she traveled to Tasmania with husband Ayush Chandhok to observe the Southern Lights.
