= Olivia Byington =

- Born: Olivia Maria Lustosa Byington; December 24, 1958 (age 67); Rio de Janeiro, Brazil
- Occupation: Singer
- Years active: 1978–present

Olivia Maria Lustosa Byington (born December 24, 1958) is a Brazilian singer. She has released several albums, and had a number one hit with the song "Lady Jane" (not to be confused with the one by the duo Jagger/Richards).

== Career ==
Byington played the guitar from the age of eight. She started her career as a vocalist at the end of the 1970s with the rock band Antena Coletiva, and with Jaques Morelenbaum. She was described by the critic Sérgio Cabral as the "best singer of her generation". Her first record, "Corra o Risco", was recorded in 1978 with "Barca do Sol." The following year, she reached the top of the hit parade with the song "Lady Jane". Her third album was recorded in Cuba.

In 1994 Byington performed concerts at the Maria Matos Theater in Lisbon. The following year she performed in Belem at the city's cultural center. She returned to Portugal for Expo 98 in Évora, Monsaraz, and Aveiro. She has performed at Lisbon's Aula Magna, and at Porto's Coliseu with Egberto Gismonti. She has performed with celebrated artists such as Tom Jobim, Chico Buarque, Edu Lobo, Djavan, Wagner Tiso, Radamés Gnatali, and João Carlos de Assis Brasil.

Byington released nine albums between 1980 and 2003: Anjo vadio (1980), Identidad (1981), Para Viver um Grande Amor (1983), Música (1984), Encontro (1984) (Chiquinha Gonzaga Award), Melodia Sentimental (1986), Olivia Byington and João Carlos Assis Brasil (1990) and A Dama do Encantado (1997), the former in tribute to Aracy de Almeida. In 2003, she released Canção do Amor Demais, in which she re-recorded an anthological album first recorded in 1958 by Elizeth Cardoso, featuring songs by Tom Jobim and Vinicius de Moraes.

In 2005, after meeting the Portuguese poet Tiago Torres da Silva in Rio de Janeiro, she returned to songwriting and recorded an album, Olivia Byington. She picked up the lyrics of "Areias do Leblon" and others followed, many with lyrics written by da Silva, but also by other poets, such as Geraldo Carneiro, Cacaso, and Marcelo Pires. Byington invited Leandro Braga and the Portuguese Pedro Jóia, who played with her in "Clarão" and "Balada do Avesso", to create part of the musical arrangements. She worked with other celebrated musicians like Marco Pereira, João Lyra, Zero and Zé Canuto, and shared the microphone with Seu Jorge in "Na Ponta dos Pés," and with singer Maria Bethânia in "Mãe Quelé," a homage to Clementina de Jesus, a deceased Afro-Brazilian singer.
