= Saudades =

Saudades may refer to:

- Saudades (Trio Beyond album), 2006
- Saudades (Nana Vasconcelos album), 1979
- Saudades, Santa Catarina, Brazil
