= Mágico (album) =

Studio album by Charlie Haden
- Released: January 1980
- Recorded: June 1979
- Studio: Talent Studio; Oslo, Norway
- Genre: Jazz
- Length: 44:13
- Label: ECM 1151
- Producer: Manfred Eicher

Charlie Haden chronology
Gitane (1979)	Mágico (1980)	Folk Songs (1981)

Jan Garbarek chronology
Photo with Blue Sky, White Cloud, Wires, Windows and a Red Roof (1979)	Mágico (1980)	Aftenland (1980)

Egberto Gismonti chronology
Solo (1978)	Mágico (1980)	Circense (1980)

Mágico (Portuguese: "Magic") is an album by bassist Charlie Haden, recorded in June 1979 and released on ECM in January the following year. The trio features saxophonist Jan Garbarek and guitarist Egberto Gismonti.

== Reception ==
The Globe and Mail noted that "there are the qualities of a folk music in the fundamental nature of Haden's work and the richness of Garbarek's saxes."

The AllMusic review by Scott Yanow stated: "The trio performs group originals and an obscurity during the picturesque and continually interesting release; this combination works well."

Professional ratings
Review scores
Source	Rating
AllMusic	4/5 stars
The Penguin Guide to Jazz Recordings	3/4 stars
The Rolling Stone Jazz Record Guide	3/5 stars

== Track listing ==
All compositions by Egberto Gismonti except as indicated:

1. "Bailarina" (Geraldo Carneiro, Piry Reis) – 14:30
2. "Mágico" – 7:47
3. "Silence" (Charlie Haden) – 10:17
4. "Spor" (Jan Garbarek) – 6:11
5. "Palhaço" – 5:00

== Personnel ==
- Charlie Haden – bass
- Jan Garbarek – saxophone
- Egberto Gismonti – guitar, piano
