= Isabel Câmara =

Brazilian dramatist and poet

- Born: Maria Isabel Câmara; May 1940; Três Corações, Minas Gerais, Brazil
- Died: 2006; Goiânia, Brazil
- Occupation: Dramatist
- Notable work: As Moças: O Beijo Final (The Young Women: The Final Kiss)

Isabel Câmara (1940 —2006) was a Brazilian playwright, poet, actress, and translator.

== Early life ==
Maria Isabel Câmara was born in Três Corações in the state of Minas Gerais in Brazil in May 1940. Before starting to write for the theatre, she had translated The Happy Journey to Trenton and Camden by Thornton Wilder, which was staged by Carlos Kroeber in Belo Horizonte in 1957. She debuted as an actress in Our Town (Nossa Cidade) by the same author. In 1967, she co-directed a show by Maria Bethânia, Comigo me Desavim. She also worked in cinema as assistant director to Domingos de Oliveira and as co-screenwriter of Uma Viagem com os Mutantes with the same director.

== Plays ==
Câmara moved to Rio de Janeiro and in 1968 her first play, Os Viajantes, was performed at the Conservatório Nacional de Teatro (National Theatre Conservatory). This, and two subsequent plays, A Escolha and O Quarto Mundo, were purchased by TV Globo to serve as the script for a series of programmes directed by Oliveira. She is, however, best known for her 1969 play, As Moças: O Beijo Final (The Young Women: The Final Kiss), which was first performed at the Teatro Cacilda Becker in São Paulo in October 1969, with only limited success. Later it was performed at the experimental theatre, Teatro Ipanema, in Rio de Janeiro and was received enthusiastically. It went on to be staged on several more occasions in the 1970s. The play concerns two young women who, having come from the countryside to try their luck in Rio de Janeiro, share an apartment in Copacabana. It discusses the problems of the youth of the time. To a certain extent it was inspired by her own life, her efforts to survive in Rio de Janeiro and her suicide attempt. As Câmara described it, As Moças represented the "accumulation of family frustrations". The play also explored homosexuality, reflecting the greater sexual freedom of the period. As Moças elevated Isabel Câmara's status within the group of theatrical authors, the so-called 1969 Generation, who were embracing the counterculture and debating issues of sexual freedom in the context of the military dictatorship in Brazil. It was published in paperback form by Gruas Livros in 2019.

== Poetry ==
During the 1970s, at a time of censorship in Brazil, Câmara became close to other writers and poets active in Rio de Janeiro, who became known as the Mimeograph Generation. Some of her poems were included in the anthology prepared by Heloísa Buarque de Hollanda, called 26 Poetas Hoje (26 poets today), published in 1975. Part of her body of work was published in Coisas Coiós (Rio de Janeiro: 7 Letras, 1998).

== Death ==
In the 1990s, Câmara left the theatre and went to live in Goiânia, where she died in 2006.
