= American Dreams (Charlie Haden album) =

2002 studio album by Charlie Haden and Michael Brecker

Studio album by Charlie Haden with Michael Brecker featuring Brad Mehldau and Brian Blade
- Released: September 2002
- Recorded: May 14–17, 2002
- Studio: Signet Soundelux in Los Angeles, California
- Genre: Jazz
- Label: Verve
- Producer: Charlie Haden, Ruth Cameron

Charlie Haden chronology
In Montreal (2001)	American Dreams (2002)	Nightfall (2004)

Michael Brecker chronology
Directions in Music: Live at Massey Hall (2002)	American Dreams (2002)	Wide Angles (2003)

American Dreams is an album by bassist Charlie Haden with saxophonist Michael Brecker, recorded in 2002 and released on the Verve label.

== Reception ==
The AllMusic review by David R. Adler stated, "This overly long quartet-plus-strings session is Charlie Haden's paean to an ideal America, made during a time that was ripe for such reflections. The band, with Haden on bass, Michael Brecker on tenor, Brad Mehldau on piano, and Brian Blade on drums, is unassailably strong."

Professional ratings
Review scores
Source	Rating
AllMusic	2.5/5 stars
The Penguin Guide to Jazz Recordings	3/4 stars

== Track listing ==
All compositions by Charlie Haden except as indicated

1. "American Dreams" - 4:52
2. "Travels" (Lyle Mays, Pat Metheny) - 6:46
3. "No Lonely Nights" (Keith Jarrett) - 5:18
4. "It Might Be You" (Alan Bergman, Marilyn Bergman, Dave Grusin) - 4:55
5. "Prism" (Jarrett) - 5:21
6. "America the Beautiful" (Katharine Lee Bates, Samuel A. Ward) - 5:23
7. "Nightfall" - 5:07
8. "Ron's Place" (Brad Mehldau) - 7:30
9. "Bittersweet" (Don Sebesky) - 6:46
10. "Young and Foolish" (Albert Hague, Arnold B. Horwitt) - 5:38
11. "Bird Food" (Ornette Coleman) - 7:31
12. "Sotto Voce" (Vince Mendoza) - 5:12
13. "Love Like Ours" (Bergman, Bergman Grusin) - 4:25
- Recorded at Signet Soundelux in Los Angeles, California, on May 14–17, 2002

== Personnel ==
Musicians

- Charlie Haden – bass
- Michael Brecker – tenor saxophone
- Brad Mehldau – piano
- Brian Blade – drums
- Unidentified String Orchestra
- Alan Broadbent – arranger, conductor (tracks 1, 3, 6, 9, & 10)
- Vince Mendoza – arranger, conductor (tracks 2 & 12)
- Jeremy Lubbock – arranger, conductor (tracks 4, 7 & 13)

Production

- Charlie Haden – producer
- Ruth Cameron – producer
- Jay Newland – engineer (recording, mixing)
- Tom Hardisty – assistant engineer (recording, mixing)
- CB Graphic – design (cover)
- Claude Emile Furones – photography (cover)
- Jim McHugh – photography (session)
