= Sanfona =

- Egberto Gismonti & Academia de danças

Studio album / Live album by Egberto Gismonti
- Released: October 26, 1981
- Recorded: November 1980 and April 1981
- Venue: Amerika Haus (disc two); München, W. Germany
- Studio: Talent Studio (disc one); Oslo, Norway
- Genre: Jazz
- Length: 95:59
- Label: ECM; ECM 1203/04
- Producer: Manfred Eicher

Egberto Gismonti chronology
Folk Songs (1981)	Sanfona (1981)	Em Família (1981)

Sanfona
- Egberto Gismonti Solo

Sanfona: Egberto Gismonti & Academia de danças / Egberto Gismonti Solo is a double album by Brazilian composer, guitarist and pianist Egberto Gismonti released on ECM in October 1981.

Egberto Gismonti & Academia de danças is a studio album, recorded in Norway in November 1980 with Gismonti's Academia de danças quartet, consisting reed player Mauro Senise and rhythm section Zeca Assumpção and Nenê.

Egberto Gismonti Solo is a solo live album, recorded at the Amerika Haus in München, West Germany in April 1981.

== Reception ==
The AllMusic review by Stephen Cook awarded the album 4 stars, stating, "With fine notes and spoken bits by Gismonti, listeners will find much in the way of Brazilian musical and cultural history to complement the music. A perfect overview for the curious fan."

Professional ratings
Review scores
Source	Rating
AllMusic	4/5 stars

== Track listing ==
All compositions by Egberto Gismonti except as indicated

=== Egberto Gismonti & Academia de danças ===
1. "Maracatu" - 8:24
2. "10 anos" - 7:33
3. "Frevo" - 8:11
4. "Lôro" - 5:34
5. "Em família/Sanfona/Dança dos pés/Eterna" - 21:10

=== Egberto Gismonti Solo ===
1. "De repente" - 16:07
2. "Vale do eco" - 7:46
3. "Cavaquinho" - 7:59
4. "12 de fevereiro" - 8:09
5. "Carta de amor" - 5:06

== Personnel ==
=== Egberto Gismonti & Academia de danças ===
- Egberto Gismonti – 10 string guitar, super 8 guitar, Indian organ, piano, voice
- Mauro Senise – soprano and alto saxophones, flute
- Zeca Assumpção – bass
- Nenê – drums, percussion

=== Egberto Gismonti Solo ===
- Egberto Gismonti – 10 string guitar, super 8 guitar, Indian organ, piano, voice
