= Solo (Egberto Gismonti album) =

Studio album by Egberto Gismonti
- Released: January 1979
- Recorded: November 1978
- Studio: Talent Studio; Oslo, Norway
- Genre: Jazz
- Length: 49:51
- Label: ECM 1136
- Producer: Manfred Eicher

Egberto Gismonti chronology
Sol Do Meio Dia (1977)	Solo (1979)	Magico (1979)

Solo is a solo album by Brazilian composer, guitarist and pianist Egberto Gismonti recorded in November 1978 and released on ECM January the following year.

== Reception ==
The AllMusic review by Stephen Cook awarded the album 4 stars, stating, "Here, Gismonti is just fine as he takes flight without any companions, treating listeners to a provocative and often meditative solo program."

Professional ratings
Review scores
Source	Rating
Allmusic	4/5 stars

== Track listing ==
All compositions by Egberto Gismonti except as noted

1. "Selva Amazonica/Pau Rolou" – 20:10
2. "Ano Zero" (Geraldo Carneiro, Gismonti) – 6:56
3. "Frevo" – 9:17
4. "Salvador" – 6:40
5. "Ciranda Nordestina" – 9:57

== Personnel ==
- Egberto Gismonti – 8-string guitar, piano, surdo, cooking bells voice
