= Storyteller =

Storyteller, story teller, or story-teller may refer to:

- A person who does storytelling

== Arts and entertainment ==
=== Film ===
- Oidhche Sheanchais, also called The Storyteller; 1935 Irish short film
- Narradores de Javé (Storytellers), a 2003 Brazilian film by Eliane Caffé
- O Contador de Histórias (The Story of Me or The Storyteller), a 2009 Brazilian film directed by Luiz Villaça
- The Storyteller, the original title of the 2017 film The Evil Within, directed by Andrew Getty
- Der Geschichtenerzähler (The Storyteller), a 1989 German film adaptation of A Suspension of Mercy

=== Television ===
- "Storyteller" (Buffy the Vampire Slayer), a 2003 episode of Buffy the Vampire Slayer
- "The Storyteller" (Star Trek: Deep Space Nine), a 1993 episode of Star Trek: Deep Space Nine
- "The Storyteller" (The Twilight Zone), a 1986 episode of The Twilight Zone
- The Storyteller (TV series), a 1988 television series by Jim Henson
- VH1 Storytellers, a VH1 music series
- The Storyteller Sequence, sequence of one-act dramas for young people by Philip Ridley
- "Storyteller" (Hazbin Hotel), an episode of the second season of Hazbin Hotel

=== Fine arts ===
- Storyteller (pottery), a motif in Pueblo pottery
- The Story Teller (painting), a 1937 painting by Amrita Sher-Gil
- The Storyteller (sculpture), a 2003 outdoor bronze sculpture by Pete Helzer, installed in Eugene, Oregon, U.S.
- Storytellers (statue), a bronze statue depicting Walt Disney, by Rick Terry and Ray Spencer

=== Gaming ===
- Story Teller (computer game) a word game by Edu-Ware
- Storyteller (video game), a 2023 game by Daniel Benmergui
- Gamemaster, a person who acts as an organizer, officiant for regarding rules, arbitrator, and moderator for a multiplayer role-playing game
- Role-playing game systems created by White Wolf Publishing:
  - Storyteller System (1991)
  - Storytelling System (2004)

=== Publications ===
- Story Teller (magazine), a children's magazine from 1982 to 1985
- The Story-Teller, an early 20th-century British fiction magazine
- Storyteller (Silko book), a 1981 collection of poetry and stories by Leslie Marmon Silko
- Storyteller (novel), a 2003 novel by Amy Thomson
- The Storyteller (Vargas Llosa novel), a 1987 novel by Mario Vargas Llosa
- The Storyteller (Picoult novel), a 2013 novel by Jodi Picoult
- "The Storyteller", a short story by H. H. Munro (Saki)
- The Storyteller (Grohl book), a 2021 autobiography by Dave Grohl
- A Suspension of Mercy, a 1965 novel by Patricia Highsmith also published under the name The Story-Teller
- The Storyteller, the third book in Traci Chee's Sea of Ink and Gold trilogy, published in 2018

=== Music ===
==== Groups ====
- Storytellers (Norwegian band), a Norwegian jazz group
- The Storyteller (band), a Swedish heavy metal band
- The Storytellers, an American Bluegrass band

==== Albums ====
- Storyteller (Marilyn Crispell album), 2003
- Storyteller (Donovan album), 2003
- Storyteller (Raghav album), 2004
- Storyteller (Crystal Waters album), 1994
- Storyteller (Carrie Underwood album), 2015
- Storyteller (Alfie Boe album), 2012
- Storyteller – The Complete Anthology: 1964–1990, a 1989 album by Rod Stewart
- The Story Teller, a 2010 album by Clutchy Hopkins
- The Storyteller, a 1998 album by Ray Davies

==== Songs ====
- "Storyteller", a song on Bradley Joseph's 1997 album Rapture

== See also ==
- Storytelling (disambiguation)
- Story (disambiguation)
