= Armando Freitas Filho =

Brazilian poet (1940–2024)

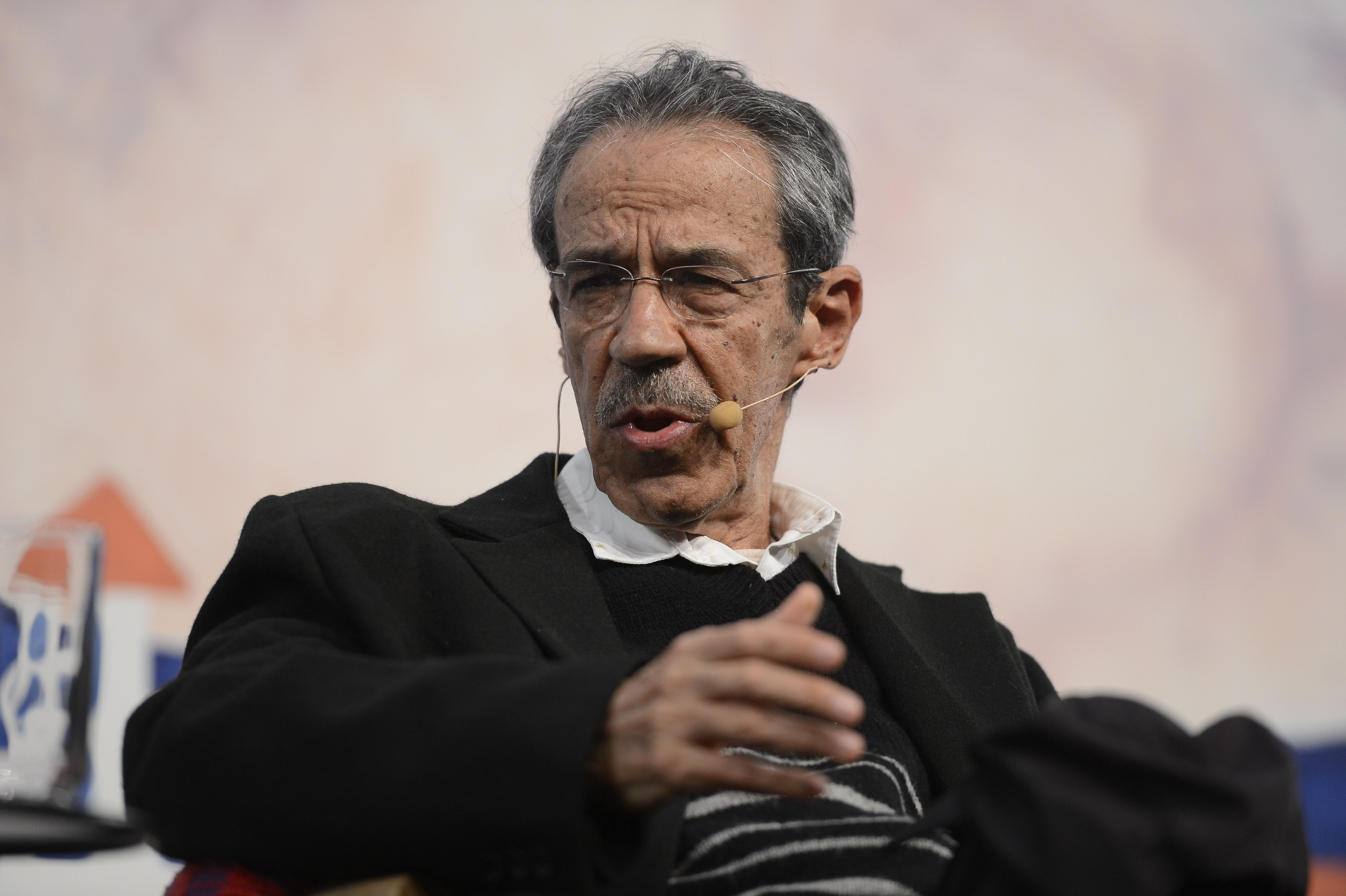
- Freitas in 2016
- Born: Armando Martins de Freitas Filho; 18 February 1940; Rio de Janeiro, Brazil
- Died: 26 September 2024 (aged 84); Rio de Janeiro, Brazil
- Occupation: Poet

Armando Martins de Freitas Filho (18 February 1940 – 26 September 2024) was a Brazilian poet.

== Early life and career ==
Freitas was born in Rio de Janeiro on 18 February 1940, and was raised in the neighborhood of Urca. He was a fan of Fluminense. Considered a notable figure in modern Brazilian literature, he had as teachers Manuel Bandeira and Carlos Drummond de Andrade, whose works he would hear recited on CD by his father. The death of his girlfriend, fellow poet Ana Cristina César, greatly influenced his life. He also has organized and published her works posthumously.

He was a researcher at the Casa de Rui Barbosa Foundation, a secretary with the Chamber of Arts at the Federal Council of Culture, and an assessor with the National Institution of Books in Rio de Janeiro. He was also a researcher at the National Library of Brazil Foundation, and assessor in the president of Funarte's cabinet, where he retired.

In 2003, Freitas published Máquina de escrever — poesia reunida e revista (1963–2003), where he celebrates 40 years of his poetry career. He received the prêmio Jabuti for his book 3x4 in 1986, as well as the Alphonsus de Guimaraens prize, given by the National Library of Brazil, in 2000 for his book livro Fio terra. In 2001, he won the Bolsa Vitae de Artes. In 2006, he published Raro mar.

In 1979, he published Poesia vírgula viva, as part of Anos 70 - Literatura, which makes a panorama of Brazilian poetry since the 1950s.

== Death ==
Freitas died in Rio de Janeiro on 26 September 2024, at the age of 84. His death was confirmed by Companhia das Letras.

== Works ==
- 1963 – Palavra, poetry
- 1966 – Dual, poetry
- 1970 – Marca registrada, poetry
- 1975 – De corpo presente, poetry
- 1979 – À mão livre, poetry
- 1982 – Longa vida, poetry
- 1985 – 3x4, poetry
- 1988 – De cor, poetry
- 1991 – Cabeça de homem, poetry
- 1994 – Números anônimos, poetry
- 1997 – Duplo cego, poetry
- 2000 – Fio terra, poetry
- 2003 – Máquina de escrever — poesia reunida e revista (1963–2003)
- 2006 – Raro mar, poetry
- 2009 – Lar, poetry
- 2013 – Dever, poetry
- 2016 – Rol, poetry

== Filmography ==
- Manter a Linha da Cordilheira sem o Desmaio da Planície (2016), documentary directed by Walter Carvalho.

== Awards ==
Year	Award	Book	Result
1986	Prêmio Jabuti	3x4	Winner
2000	Prêmio Alphonsus de Guimaraens	Fio Terra	Winner
2003	Prêmio Jabuti	Máquina de Escrever	3rd place
2007	Prêmio Jabuti	Raro Mar	3rd place
2010	Prêmio Portugal Telecom de Literatura	Lar	3rd place
2011	Prêmio Moacyr Scliar	Lar	Honorable mention
2014	Prêmio Alphonsus de Guimaraens	Dever	Winner
2014	Prêmio Alceu Amoroso Lima - Poesia e Liberdade		Winner
