= Storytelling (disambiguation) =

Storytelling is the art of portraying real or fictitious events in words, images, and sounds.

Storytelling may also refer to:

- Storytelling (film), a 2001 film directed by Todd Solondz
  - Storytelling (Belle and Sebastian album), a 2002 album by Belle & Sebastian, soundtrack to the film
- Storytelling (Jean-Luc Ponty album), a 1989 album by Jean-Luc Ponty
- Storytelling (Fred Frith album), a 2017 album by Fred Frith
- Storytelling (Naná Vasconcelos album), 1995
- "Storytelling", a 2003 song by Funeral for a Friend from Casually Dressed & Deep in Conversation
- Storytelling (Yellowjackets), an episode of the American TV series Yellowjackets
- "Storytelling", an episode of the TV series Adventure Time
- Storytelling System, a role-playing game system

== See also ==
- Storyteller (disambiguation)
- Stori Telling, a non-fiction book by Tori Spelling
- Telling Stories (disambiguation)
