= Sol do meio dia =

Studio album by Egberto Gismonti
- Released: 1978
- Recorded: November 1977
- Studio: Talent Studio; Oslo, Norway
- Genre: Jazz
- Length: 50:39
- Label: ECM 1116
- Producer: Manfred Eicher

Egberto Gismonti chronology
| Dança das cabeças (1977) | Sol do meio dia (1978) | Solo (1977) |

Sol do meio dia (Portuguese: "Noonday Sun") is an album by Brazilian composer, guitarist and pianist Egberto Gismonti recorded in November 1977 and released on ECM the following year.

== Reception ==
The AllMusic review by Stephen Cook awarded the album 4 stars, calling it an "impressive combo outing... Highly recommended."

Professional ratings
Review scores
| Source | Rating |
|---|---|
| Allmusic | 4/5 stars |

== Track listing ==
All compositions by Egberto Gismonti

1. "Palácio de Pinturas" - 5:37
2. "Raga" - 8:52
3. "Kalimba" - 5:19
4. "Coração" - 6:01
5. "Café / Sapain / Dança Solitária No. 2 / Baião Malandro" - 24:50

== Personnel ==
- Egberto Gismonti – 8-string guitar, kalimba, piano, wood flutes, voice, bottle
- Naná Vasconcelos – percussion, berimbau, tama, corpo, voice, bottle (tracks 2, 3 & 5)
- Ralph Towner – 12 string guitar (tracks 1 & 5)
- Collin Walcott – tabla, bottle (track 2)
- Jan Garbarek – soprano saxophone (track 5)
