= Naná Vasconcelos =

Brazilian musician (1944–2016)

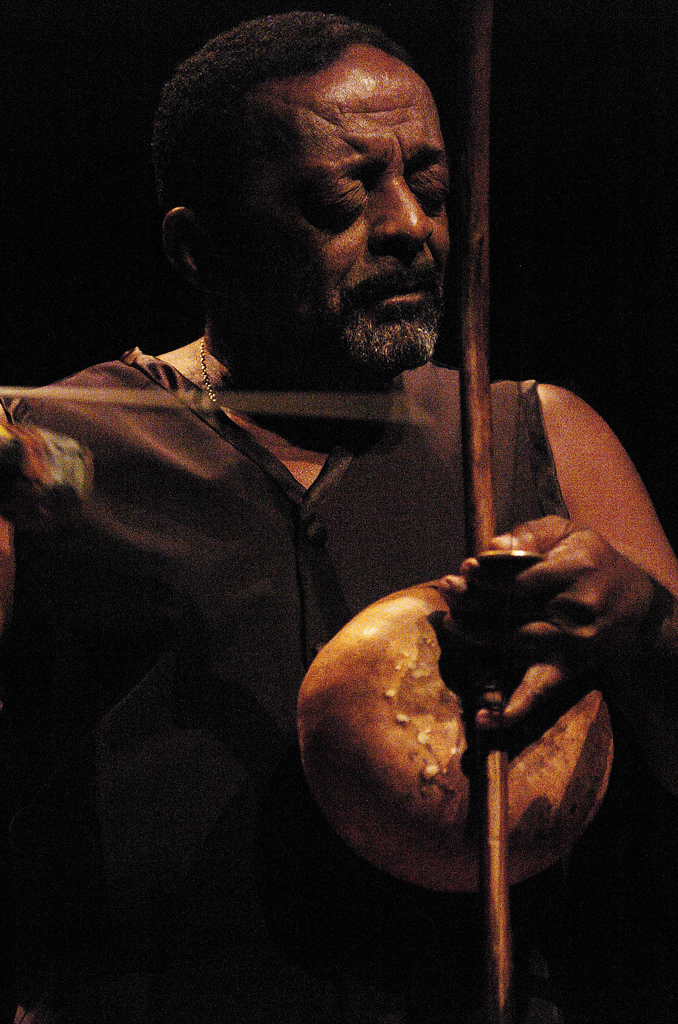
- Vasconcelos performing in Brazil, 2005

Background information
- Born: Juvenal de Holanda Vasconcelos; 2 August 1944; Recife, Brazil
- Died: 9 March 2016 (aged 71) Recife, Brazil
- Genres: Brazilian; jazz; world
- Occupations: Musician; singer; songwriter
- Instruments: Percussion; berimbau; vocals
- Years active: 1973–2016

Juvenal de Holanda Vasconcelos, known as Naná Vasconcelos (2 August 1944 – 9 March 2016), was a Brazilian percussionist, vocalist and berimbau player, notable for his work as a solo artist on over two dozen albums, and as a backing musician with Pat Metheny, Don Cherry, Jan Garbarek, Egberto Gismonti, Gato Barbieri, and Milton Nascimento.

== Life and career ==
Vasconcelos was born in Recife, Brazil. Beginning from 1967 he joined many artists' works as a percussionist. Among his many collaborations, he contributed to four Jon Hassell albums from 1976 to 1980 (including Possible Musics by Brian Eno and Hassell), and later to several Pat Metheny Group works and Jan Garbarek concerts from early 1980s to early 1990s. In 1984 he appeared on the Pierre Favre album Singing Drums along with Paul Motian. He also appears on Arild Andersen's album If You Look Far Enough with Ralph Towner.

He formed a group named Codona with Don Cherry and Collin Walcott, which released three albums in 1978, 1980 and 1982.

Between 1984 and 1989, he was the Honorary President of the first samba school in the UK, the London School of Samba.

In 1981 he performed at the Woodstock Jazz Festival, held in celebration of the tenth anniversary of the Creative Music Studio. In 1998, Vasconcelos contributed "Luz de Candeeiro" to the AIDS benefit compilation album Onda Sonora: Red Hot + Lisbon produced by the Red Hot Organization.

Vasconcelos was awarded the Best Percussionist Of The Year by the Down Beat Critics Poll for seven consecutive years, from 1984 to 1990. He was also honored with eight Grammy Awards.

Vasconcelos was diagnosed with lung cancer in mid 2015. He died from the disease on 9 March 2016, in Recife. He is survived by his two daughters, Jasmin Azul and Luz Morena.

The work "Vasconcelos" is dedicated to his honor, recorded on the 2018 Michael Waldrop release Origin Suite.

== Instruments ==
Vasconcelos played congas, berimbau, gourd, triangle, drums, cymbals, repique, tambourine, gong, caxixi, talking drum, cuica, shaker, palmas, pandeiro, zabumba, udu, cabasa, prato, tambor, hi-hats, bells, water drum, vibraphone, güiro, ganza, cowbell, tabla, xequere, Turkish drum, repique, surdo, shells, African bells, agogo bells, clay pot, timpani, snare drum, flexatone, Tibetan gong and other assorted percussion.

== Discography ==
=== As leader ===
- El Increible Nana Con Agustin Pereyra Lucena (Tonodisc, 1971)
- Amazonas (Philips, 1973)
- Nana, Nelson Angelo, Novelli (Saravah, 1975)
- Saudades (ECM, 1980)
- Zumbi (Europa, 1983)
- Lester (Soul Note, 1987)
- Bush Dance (Antilles, 1987)
- Rain Dance (Antilles, 1989)
- Storytelling (Hemisphere, 1995)
- Fragments Modern Tradition (Tzadik, 1997)
- Contaminacao (M. Officer Estudio 1999)
- Minha Lôa (Net, 2001)
- Chegada (Azul Music, 2005)
- Trilhas (Azul Music, 2006)
- Sinfonia & Batuques (Azul Music, 2011)
- 4 Elementos (Pernambuco, 2013)

=== As sideman ===
With Ambitious Lovers

- Greed (Virgin, 1988)
- Love Overlap (Virgin, 1988)
- Lust (Elektra, 1991)

With Arild Andersen

- Sagn (Kirkelig Kulturverksted, 1990)
- If You Look Far Enough (ECM, 1993)
- Arv (Kirkelig Kulturverksted, 1994)

With Gato Barbieri

- Fenix (Flying Dutchman, 1971)
- El Pampero (Flying Dutchman, 1972)
- Live in Buenos Ayres 1971 (Oxford, 1976)
- Bolivia (RCA, 1985)

With Don Cherry

- Organic Music Society (Caprice, 1973)
- Multikuti (A&M, 1990)
- Live at the Bracknell Jazz Festival, 1986 (BBC, 2002)
- Om Shanti Om (Black Sweat, 2020

With Codona

- Codona (ECM, 1979)
- Codona 2 (ECM, 1981)
- Codona 3 (ECM, 1983)

With Pino Daniele

- Musicante (EMI/Bagaria, 1984)
- Scio (Atlantic, 1984)
- Iguana Cafe (RCA/Sony BMG, 2005)

With Eliane Elias

- Eliane Elias Plays Jobim (Blue Note, 1990)
- Fantasia (Blue Note, 1992)
- Paulistana (Blue Note, 1993)

With Jan Garbarek

- Eventyr (ECM, 1981)
- Legend of the Seven Dreams (ECM, 1988)
- I Took Up the Runes (ECM, 1990)

With Egberto Gismonti

- Danca das Cabecas (ECM, 1977)
- Sol do Meio Dia (ECM, 1978)
- Duas Vozes (ECM, 1984)
- Trem Caipira (EMI, 1985)

With Jon Hassell

- Earthquake Island (Tomato, 1978)
- Vernal Equinox (Lovely Music, 1978)
- Fourth World, Vol. 1: Possible Musics (Editions EG/Polydor, 1980)
- Sulla Strada (Materiali Sonori, 1995)

With Arto Lindsay

- Subtle Body (ArsNova, 1996)
- Reentry (Gut for Life, 1997)
- Noon Chill (Bar/None, 1998)

With Pat Metheny

- As Falls Wichita, So Falls Wichita Falls (ECM, 1981)
- Offramp (ECM, 1982)
- Travels (ECM, 1983)
- Secret Story (Geffen, 1992)

With Milton Nascimento

- Milagre dos peixes (Odeon, 1973)
- Geraes (EMI, 1976)
- Journey to Dawn (A&M, 1979)
- Miltons (CBS, 1988)
- Angelus (Warner 1993)
- Milton (EMI, 1995)
- Maria Maria/Ultimo Trem (Warner 2002)
- Maria Maria (Far Out, 2019)

With Caetano Veloso

- Estrangeiro (Philips, 1989)
- Circuladô (Philips, 1991)
- Antologia 67/03 (Universal, 2003)

== With others ==
- Pierre Akendengue, Nandipo (Saravah, 1974)
- Herb Alpert, You Smile – The Song Begins (1974)
- Laurie Anderson, Strange Angels (Warner Bros., 1989)
- Badi Assad, Verde (Edge Music, 2004)
- Aztec Camera, Dreamland (Edsel, 1993)
- Ginger Baker, Horses & Trees (Celluloid, 1986)
- Zeca Baleiro, Cafe No Bule (Selo, 2015)
- Harry Belafonte, Turn the World Around (CBS, 1977)
- Walter Bishop Jr., Illumination (1977)
- Luiz Bonfa, The New Face of Bonfa (RCA, 2003)
- Safy Boutella, Mejnoun (Indigo, 1992)
- Jonathan Butler, Head to Head (Mercury, 1993)
- Vinicius Cantuaria, Tucuma (Verve, 1998)
- Carminho, Canto (Warner/Parlophone, 2014)
- Baikida Carroll, Orange Fish Tears (Palm, 1974)
- Ron Carter, Patrão (Milestone, 1981)
- Jean-Roger Caussimon, Jean-Roger Caussimon (Saravah, 1974)
- Gal Costa, Legal (Philips, 1970)
- Beverley Craven, Love Scenes (550 Music/Epic, 1993)
- Eduardo De Crescenzo, Cante Jondo (Ricordi, 1991)
- Jack DeJohnette, Irresistible Forces (MCA Impulse! 1987)
- Joao Donato, Quem e Quem (Odeon, 1973)
- Luiz Eca, La Nueva Onda De Brasil (Lazarus, 2004)
- Pierre Favre, Singing Drums (ECM, 1984)
- Cordel do Fogo Encantado, Cordel do Fogo Encantado (Rec-Beat, 2001)
- Michael Franks, Passionfruit (Warner Bros., 1983)
- Chico Freeman, The Search (India Navigation, 1983)
- Gipsy Kings, Love and Liberté (CBS/Sony, 1993)
- Danny Gottlieb, Whirlwind (Atlantic, 1989)
- Trilok Gurtu, Living Magic (CMP, 1991)
- Jay Hoggard, Days Like These (Arista GRP, 1979)
- Rolf Kuhn, The Day After (MPS, 1972)
- Sergio Mendes, Brasil '88 (RCA, 2002)
- Shigeharu Mukai, Pleasure (Better Days, 1980)
- Mark Helias, The Current Set (Enja, 1987)
- Terumasa Hino, City Connection (Flying Disk, 1979)
- Terumasa Hino, Daydream (JVC, 1990)
- Bendik Hofseth, Itaka (Grappa, 2005)
- Toninho Horta, Moonstone (PolyMedia, 1989)
- Joyce, Visions of Dawn (Far Out, 2009)
- Nigel Kennedy, Kafka (EMI, 1996)
- Chaka Khan, Naughty (Warner Bros., 1980)
- B.B. King, Now Appearing at Ole Miss (MCA, 1980)
- B.B. King, King of the Blues (MCA, 1992)
- Joachim Kuhn, Hip Elegy (MPS/BASF, 1976)
- Jon Lucien, Romantico (Zemajo, 1980)
- John Lurie, Down by Law (Made to Measure/Crammed Discs, 1987)
- Lyle Mays, Lyle Mays (Geffen, 1986)
- Lloyd McNeill, Tori (Baobab, 1978)
- Lloyd McNeill, Elegia (Baobab, 1980)
- Sérgio Mendes, Brasil '88 (1986)
- Marisa Monte, Mais (EMI, 1991)
- Marisa Monte, Green, Blue, Yellow, Rose and Charcoal (Metro Blue/EMI, 1994)
- Bob Moses, When Elephants Dream of Music (Gramavision, 1983)
- Mundo Livre S/A, Samba Esquema Noise (Banguela, 1994)
- Oliver Nelson, Swiss Suite (Philips, 1972)
- Os Mutantes, A Divina Comédia ou Ando Meio Desligado (1970)
- Penguin Cafe Orchestra, Union Cafe (Zopf, 1993)
- Jim Pepper, Comin' and Goin' (Antilles, 1983)
- Ivo Perelman, Man of the Forest (GM, 1994)
- Jean-Luc Ponty, Live at Montreux 72 (Pierre Cardin/Disc'Az 1972)
- Enrico Rava, String Band (Soul Note, 1984)
- Claudio Roditi, Red, On (Red/CTI, 1984)
- Orphy Robinson, The Funky End of Things (Blue Note, 1994)
- Orphy Robinson, The Vibes Describes (Blue Note, 1994)
- Perry Robinson, Nana Vasconcelos, Badal Roy, Kundalini (Improvising Artists, 1978)
- Badal Roy, Asian Journal (Music of the World, 1994)
- Ryuichi Sakamoto, Beauty (Virgin, 1989)
- Monica Salmaso, Trampolim (Discmedi Blau, 1998)
- David Sanborn, Upfront (Elektra, 1992)
- Masahiko Satoh, Randooga (Epic, 1990)
- Zbigniew Seifert, Passion (Capitol, 1979)
- Woody Shaw, For Sure! (Columbia, 1980)
- Woody Shaw, Rosewood (Columbia, 1998)
- Andy Sheppard, Inclassificable (Label Bleu, 1994)
- Robertinho Silva, Robertinho Silva (Philips, 1981)
- Carly Simon, Have You Seen Me Lately? (Arista, 1990)
- Paul Simon, The Rhythm of the Saints (Warner Bros., 1990)
- U. Srinivas, Dream (Real World/Virgin, 1995)
- Jeremy Steig, Rain Forest (CMP, 1980)
- Fredy Studer, Seven Songs (veraBra, 1991)
- Andy Summers, World Gone Strange (Private Music, 1991)
- Talking Heads, Little Creatures (Sire, 1985)
- Gary Thomas, By Any Means Necessary (JMT, 1989)
- Leon Thomas, Gold Sunrise on Magic Mountain (Mega/Flying Dutchman, 1971)
- Trio da Paz, Black Orpheus (Kokopelli, 1994)
- Akiko Yano, Love Life (Nonesuch, 1993)
- Yellowjackets, Like a River (GRP, 1993)
