= Aftenland =

Studio album by Jan Garbarek and Kjell Johnsen
- Released: 1980
- Recorded: December 1979
- Studios: Engelbrekt Church; Stockholm, Sweden
- Genre: Jazz
- Length: 45:13
- Label: ECM 1162
- Producer: Manfred Eicher

Jan Garbarek chronology
Mágico (1980)	Aftenland (1980)	Eventyr (1981)

Aftenland is an album by Norwegian jazz composer and saxophonist Jan Garbarek and organist Kjell Johnsen, recorded at the Engelbrekt Church in Stockholm in December 1979 and released on ECM the following year.

== Reception ==
The AllMusic review awarded the album 2 stars.

Professional ratings
Review scores
Source	Rating
AllMusic	2/5 stars
The Penguin Guide to Jazz Recordings	2/4 stars
The Rolling Stone Jazz Record Guide	3/5 stars

== Track listing ==
All compositions by Jan Garbarek and Kjell Johnsen

1. " Aftenland" - 7:14
2. "Syn" - 6:42
3. "Linje" - 1:58
4. "Bue" - 2:04
5. "Enigma" - 3:39
6. "Kilden" - 7:33
7. "Spill" - 4:21
8. "Iskirken" - 6:48
9. "Tegn" - 4:54

== Personnel ==
- Jan Garbarek – soprano saxophone, tenor saxophone, wood flute
- Kjell Johnsen – pipe organ
