= Saudades (Naná Vasconcelos album) =

Studio album by Naná Vasconcelos
- Released: 1980
- Recorded: March 1979
- Studios: Tonstudio Bauer; Ludwigsburg, West Germany
- Genre: Jazz
- Length: 44:13
- Label: ECM 1147
- Producer: Manfred Eicher

Naná Vasconcelos chronology
Africadeus (1973)	Saudades (1980)	Zumbi (1983)

Saudades (Portuguese: "The Blues") is an album by Brazilian jazz percussionist Naná Vasconcelos recorded in March 1979 and released on ECM the following year. The ensemble features guitarist Egberto Gismonti backed by the Stuttgart Radio Symphony Orchestra, conducted by Mladen Gutesha.

== Reception ==
The AllMusic review by John Storm Roberts awarded the album 4½ stars, stating, "This 1979 recording is probably Afro-experimentalist Vasconcelos' finest. It presents his various facets—berimbao playing, intricate overlain vocals, fine percussion, even gorgeous guitar—simply and almost overwhelmingly. This is one of those performances that remind one to never let natural dogmatism get too out of hand."

Professional ratings
Review scores
Source	Rating
Allmusic	4.5/5 stars
DownBeat	4.5/5 stars

== Track listing ==
All compositions by Naná Vasconcelos except as indicated

1. "O Berimbau" - 18:58
2. "Vozes (Saudades)" - 3:14
3. "Ondas (No ólhos de Petronila)" - 7:53
4. "Cego aderaldo" (Egberto Gismonti) - 10:32
5. "Dado" - 3:36

== Personnel ==
- Naná Vasconcelos – berimbau, percussion, gongs, voice
- Egberto Gismonti – guitar
- Mladen Gutesha – conductor
  - Stuttgart Radio Symphony Orchestra
