= Om Shanti Om (album) =

Live album by Don Cherry
- Released: 2020
- Recorded: 1976
- Venue: RAI Studios, Rome, Italy
- Genre: Free jazz
- Length: 47:23
- Label: Black Sweat Records; BS058

Om Shanti Om is a live album by multi-instrumentalist Don Cherry. It was recorded in 1976 at RAI Studios in Rome, Italy, for television broadcast, and was released in 2020 by Black Sweat Records. On the album, Cherry is heard on pocket trumpet, ngoni, kora, and flute, and is joined by Naná Vasconcelos on berimbau, Gian Piero Pramaggiore on guitar, and his wife Moki Cherry on tambura.

== Reception ==
Professional ratings
Review scores
Source	Rating
Jazzwise	4/5 stars
The Free Jazz Collective	3/5 stars
Tom Hull – on the Web	B+

In a review for Jazzwise, Edwin Pouncey wrote that, on the album, "the hard-edged urban blast of 1960s modern jazz is replaced with a more meditational organic music groove where the assembled players become sonically entwined. Here vocal chant and percussion are utilised to form densely patterned layers of undulating rhythm."

A writer for Komakino described the album as "a blissful compendium of mesmeric vibes, spiritually retuning your innermost self," and commented: "I reached the needed inner consciousness."

Author Daniel B. Sharp remarked: "Although this music has moved away from jazz to the point that it is largely no longer recognizable as such, Don asserts... that 'jazz is the glue' that holds together the... musical elements." He noted that Cherry and his group were "breaking down boundaries between their art and their lives."

== Track listing ==
1. "Luna Turca" (Gian Piero Pramaggiore) – 1:44
2. "Om Shanti Om" (Don Cherry) – 6:55
3. "Chenrezig" (Don Cherry) – 11:49
4. "Nana's Solo" (Naná Vasconcelos) – 3:56
5. "A Chi Chi Ou" (Don Cherry) – 1:39
6. "Koye" (Don Cherry) – 6:32
7. "Flute Song" (Don Cherry) – 5:16
8. "Dissolution" (Don Cherry) – 9:29

== Personnel ==
- Don Cherry – pocket trumpet, ngoni, kora, flute, vocals
- Naná Vasconcelos – berimbau, percussion, vocals
- Gian Piero Pramaggiore – guitar, flute, vocals
- Moki Cherry – tambura, vocals
