= Telling Stories =

Telling Stories may refer to:

- Telling Stories (album), an album by Tracy Chapman
- Telling Stories (book), an autobiography by Tim Burgess of the Charlatans
- Tellin' Stories, an album by the Charlatans
- Telling Stories with Tomie dePaola, a children's TV series made by the Jim Henson Company

== See also ==
- Storytelling (disambiguation)
