= Circense =

Studio album by Egberto Gismonti
- Released: 1980
- Genre: Brazilian jazz
- Length: 48:55
- Label: EMI
- Producer: Mariozinho Rocha

Egberto Gismonti chronology
Mágico (1980)	Circense (1980)	Folk Songs (1981)

Professional ratings
Review scores
Source	Rating
Allmusic	4.5/5 stars

Circense is a 1980 studio album recorded by the Brazilian composer and multi-instrumentalist Egberto Gismonti. The album was created with the idea of being a "musical circus" and its sessions feature some of the most beloved Brazilian musicians of that period.

It was listed by Rolling Stone Brazil as one of the 100 best Brazilian albums in history.

== Track listing ==
#	Title	Songwriters	Length
1.	"Karatê"	Egberto Gismonti	4:59
2.	"Cego Aderaldo"	Gismonti	6:25
3.	"Mágico"	Gismonti	7:14
4.	"Palhaço"	Gismonti, Geraldo E. Carneiro	5:51
5.	"Tá boa, santa?"	Gismonti	5:54
6.	"Equilibrista"	Gismonti	8:13
7.	"Ciranda"	Gismonti	5:33
8.	"Mais que a paixão"	Gismonti, João Carlos Pádua	4:42

== Personnel ==
- Egberto Gismonti: ten-string acoustic guitar, piano and vocals
- Mauro Senise: saxophone and flute
- Luiz Alves: bass
- Robertinho Silva: percussion
- Silvio Mehry: piano
- Pery Reis: guitar
- Aleuda Malu: vocals and percussion
- Dulce Bressane: vocals
- Pepê Castro-Neves: vocals
- Benito Juarez: string orchestra conduction

Special guest:

- Lakshminarayana Shankar: violin (in "Cego Aderaldo")
