= Road to the Lemon Grove =

- Film poster
- Directed by: Dale Hildebrand
- Written by: Charly Chiarelli; Dale Hildebrand
- Produced by: Chris Gunther; Dale Hildebrand
- Starring: Charly Chiarelli; Burt Young; Nick Mancuso; Rossella Brescia
- Cinematography: Johnny Askwith
- Edited by: Dale Hildebrand
- Music by: Claudio Vena
- Production company: Lemon Grove Motion Pictures
- Release date: June 16, 2018 (ICFF)
- Running time: 89 minutes
- Country: Canada
- Language: English

Road to the Lemon Grove is a 2018 Canadian comedy-drama film, directed by Dale Hildebrand.

== Plot ==
The film stars Charly Chiarelli in a dual role as Antonio Contatini, an elderly man who has died but is stuck in limbo as his earthly mission is not yet completed, and Calogero Contatini, Antonio's son who is part of the family feud that is preventing Antonio's admission to heaven. Calogero is undertaking a road trip to scatter Antonio's ashes at the family-owned lemon grove in Racalmuto; however, his brother Vincenzo (Burt Young) wants to sell the grove to the developers of an amusement park, and dispatches Guido (Nick Mancuso) to try to stop Calogero. The film's cast also includes Loreena McKennitt as the voice of God.

== Release ==
The film premiered at Toronto's Italian Contemporary Film Festival in 2018, before going into commercial release in August 2019.

== Awards ==
Steven Sangster received a Canadian Screen Award nomination for Best Visual Effects at the 8th Canadian Screen Awards in 2020.
