= Vera Pedrosa =

Brazilian diplomat (1936–2021)

- Born: 2 January 1936; Rio de Janeiro, Brazil
- Died: 3 February 2021 (aged 85); Rio de Janeiro, Brazil
- Other name: Vera Pedrosa Martins Almeida
- Education: Federal University of Rio de Janeiro
- Occupation: Diplomat
- Known for: Brazil's ambassador to France (2005-2008); first woman to hold a senior position in Brazil's Ministry of Foreign Affairs
- Spouse: Luciano Martins de Almeida
- Children: Three

Vera Pedrosa (2 January 1936 — 3 February 2021) was a Brazilian diplomat and poet. Holding several ambassadorial posts, including that in Paris, she was also the first woman to assume the position of Under Secretary General for Political Affairs, the third-ranked position in the Ministry of Foreign Affairs hierarchy.

== Early life ==
Vera Pedrosa Martins Almeida was born in Rio de Janeiro on 2 January 1936, daughter of Mary Houston Pedrosa and the writer and art critic, Mário Pedrosa. Her family home was frequented by artists, writers, art critics, philosophers and politicians. She spent part of her childhood in Washington, D.C. and New York City as her parents, who were Trotskyists, were forced into exile during Brazil's Estado Novo regime. She graduated in philosophy from the then Federal University of Brazil, now known as the Federal University of Rio de Janeiro. From 1960 to 1967 she worked as a journalist at the Correio da Manhã and the Jornal do Brasil. In 1966, as the military dictatorship increased its repression of the press, she found that work as a journalist was becoming unsafe and insecure, as several papers had been forced to close. By this time, she had separated from her husband, the sociologist Luciano Martins de Almeida, and was looking for a secure profession that would enable her to bring up their three children.

== Diplomatic career ==
In 1966, Pedrosa passed the admission exam for the Brazilian diplomatic training school, the Rio Branco Institute, and began the course in 1967. On 24 October 1968, she was appointed Third Secretary, initially working in the cultural area of the Ministry of Foreign Affairs, commonly known as Itamaraty in Brazil, after the palace that houses the ministry. After a few months she transferred to the General Secretariat for Foreign Affairs, where she remained until 1972. Despite her heavy workload and her role as a mother, Pedrosa found time to write poetry. Among the poets in Brazil who came to be known as the Mimeograph Generation, she was one of the authors included in the 26 Poetas Hoje (26 poets today) anthology, published in 1975.

Within the ministry it was not easy for women to get postings abroad and Pedrosa also suffered discrimination because of her father's reputation. Her first overseas posting was in 1972, to the Brazilian Embassy in Madrid, Spain, where she remained until 1975 as the cultural attaché. From 1975 to 1977, she was stationed at the Embassy in Lima, Peru, where she was successively responsible for the cultural, press and political sectors. In August 1977, she was promoted to first secretary and in 1981 she was promoted to counsellor, the third rung on the Brazilian diplomatic ladder. In October of the same year, she was assigned to the United Nations Division of the Ministry of Foreign Affairs, where she began specialising in environmental issues at the multilateral level. From 1983 to 1986, she was stationed at the Brazilian Embassy in Paris, working as the Brazilian representative to UNESCO. During this time she defended her thesis at the Rio Branco Institute. Returning to Brazil, she worked at the Ministry of Culture in 1986 and 1987, then becoming Head of the United Nations Division, being promoted again in October 1987.

Between 1988 and 1992, Pedrosa served as coordinator of the Cabinet of the Minister of State at Itamaraty, Roberto de Abreu Sodré, where she helped prepare Brazil's application to host the 1992 Earth Summit, which was held in Rio de Janeiro. She then headed the Diplomatic Advisory Service of President Itamar Franco, working with the diplomat Celso Amorim and the future president Fernando Henrique Cardoso in developing the Plano Real, an economic stabilization programme. In 1993, she was promoted to Minister, First Class.

Pedrosa's ambassadorial career began in 1995, when she was appointed Brazil's ambassador to the Netherlands. In 1999 she became the ambassador in Ecuador, transferring to Denmark in 2001, where she had intended to end her diplomatic career. However, in 2003, she was invited by Amorim to be the first female Under Secretary General for Political Affairs, the third most important position in the ministry. She was in this position until 2005 when she was appointed ambassador in Paris, taking the role at the time the "Year of Brazil in France" was celebrated, involving 400 events and attracting 15 million spectators. Reaching the mandatory retirement age on 3 January 2006, she was appointed Ambassador Extraordinary and Plenipotentiary, allowing her to stay in Paris until the beginning of 2008.

== Death ==
Pedrosa died on 3 February 2021, in Rio de Janeiro.
