= Água e Vinho =

Aqua e Vinho

Studio album by Egberto Gismonti
- Released: 1972
- Recorded: 1972
- Genre: Jazz
- Label: EMI/Odeon

Egberto Gismonti chronology
Orfeo Novo (1970)	Aqua e Vinho (1972)	Egberto Gismonti (1973)

Água e Vinho is an album by Brazilian pianist and guitarist Egberto Gismonti that was released in 1972. The album contains the songs "Água e Vinho" and "Ano Zero" with lyrics by Geraldo E. Carneiro. These became two of his most popular songs.

== Track listing ==
All tracks are written by Egberto Gismonti

No.	Title	Length
1.	"Ano Zero"	3:19
2.	"Federico"	3:30
3.	"Janela de Ouro"	3:43
4.	"Vila Rica 1720"	1:54
5.	"Pr'um Samba"	3:06
6.	"Água e Vinho"	2:21
7.	"Volante"	4:11
8.	"Eterna"	3:54
9.	"Tango"	3:07
10.	"Mulhe Rendeira"	1:56

== Personnel ==
- Egberto Gismonti – guitar, piano, vocals
- Novelli – bass
- Robertinho Silva – drums
