= Wide Angles =

Studio album by Michael Brecker Quindectet
- Released: September 9, 2003
- Recorded: January 22–24, 2003
- Studio: Bennett Studios (Englewood, New Jersey)
- Genre: Jazz
- Length: 70:20
- Label: Verve
- Producer: Michael Brecker: Gil Goldstein; Jason Olaine

Michael Brecker Quindectet chronology
American Dreams (2002)	Wide Angles (2003)	Some Skunk Funk (2005)

Professional ratings
Review scores
Source	Rating
AllMusic	2.5/5 stars
The Penguin Guide to Jazz Recordings	3/4 stars

Wide Angles is a studio live album led by saxophonist Michael Brecker that won the Grammy Award for Best Large Jazz Ensemble Album in 2004.

== Track listing ==
All tracks are written by Michael Brecker except where noted.

No.	Title	Writer(s)	Length
1.	"Broadband"		6:46
2.	"Cool Day in Hell"		7:51
3.	"Angle of Repose"		6:42
4.	"Timbuktu"		8:00
5.	"Night Jessamine"		5:21
6.	"Scylla"	Michael Brecker, George Whitty	10:40
7.	"Brexterity"		6:40
8.	"Evening Faces"	Don Grolnick	7:14
9.	"Modus Operandy"		5:27
10.	"Never Alone"		5:39

== Personnel ==
=== Michael Brecker Quindectet ===
- Michael Brecker – tenor saxophone, arrangements
- Adam Rogers – guitars
- John Patitucci – bass
- Antonio Sánchez – drums
- Daniel Sadownick – percussion
- Steve Wilson – alto flute
- Iain Dixon – bass clarinet, clarinet
- Charles Pillow – English horn, oboe
- Robin Eubanks – trombone
- Alex Sipiagin – trumpet
- Peter Gordon – French horn
- Erik Friedlander – cello
- Lois Martin – viola
- Mark Feldman – violin, concertmaster
- Joyce Hammann – violin
- Gil Goldstein – additional arrangements, arrangements (tracks 3, 6, 8), orchestration, conductor

=== Technical personnel ===
- Michael Brecker – producer
- Gil Goldstein – producer
- Jason Olaine – executive producer
- Jay Newland – recording and mixing
- Brian Dozoretz – assistant engineer
- George Whitty – digital editing
- Greg Calbi – mastering at Sterling Sound, New York City, USA
- Nicole Hegeman – production coordination
- Darryl Pitt – production coordination
- Tommy Wilson – production coordination
- Theodora Kuslan – release coordinator
- Kelly Pratt – release coordinator
- Marsha Black – A&R administration
- Hollis King – art direction
- Nicholas Wilton – illustration
- Michael Piazza – photography
