= A Suspension of Mercy =

1965 novel by Patricia Highsmith

- First UK edition
- Author: Patricia Highsmith
- Language: English
- Genre: Thriller
- Set in: Suffolk, England
- Published: Heinemann (1965)
- Pages: 251

A Suspension of Mercy (1965) is a psychological thriller novel by Patricia Highsmith. It was published in the US under the title The Story-Teller later the same year by Doubleday. It was the eleventh of her 22 novels.

== Composition ==
The book was written at Bridge Cottage, Earl Soham in Suffolk, which she had moved into in 1964. It is the only novel she both wrote and set in Suffolk. The protagonist's surname refers to Herman Melville's short story "Bartleby, the Scrivener" and its enigmatic title character.

== Synopsis ==
Sydney Bartleby is an American novelist living near Framlingham, Suffolk with his English wife Alicia. Although seemingly idyllic, their married life is secretly marked by tension, frequent separations and sometimes domestic abuse. Sydney is trying to sell a novel and he and his writing partner, Alex, work together on a crime serial that they hope to sell to British television. Alicia decides suddenly that their marriage merits a trial separation, one during which she insists they promise not to contact each other, and Sydney agrees. For literary inspiration, he attempts to put himself in a murderer's mindset and, early the morning after Alicia leaves, carries an empty carpet to his car, imagining its weight and how he might struggle with it if her body was actually in it. He half-hopes his neighbour, Mrs. Lilybanks, will spot him doing this and envisions being questioned by the police. He drives to bury the carpet in the countryside. Shortly afterwards, many of Alicia's and Sydney's acquaintances, and her parents, are concerned about having not heard from her. She is declared missing and the spectre of doubt falls on Sydney. Mrs. Lilybanks indeed saw him carrying the carpet to his car and, though she initially does not suspect him of anything, circumstance and Sydney's behaviour causes her to openly wonder.

Alicia is alive, however, and living in Brighton under an assumed name with her extra-marital lover, Edward Tilbury. Edward becomes uncomfortable with the media circus around her disappearance, though Alicia insists that they continue living their ruse. She claims that Sydney is becoming increasingly mentally unstable. Sydney, meanwhile, is becoming more seriously implicated after flippant jokes he makes to Alex are taken seriously, and police find a notebook in which he hypothetically details Alicia's murder. Police locate and dig up the empty carpet, but things become worse when Sydney goes to tell Mrs. Lilybanks this apparent good news and, when he enters her living room, she is suffering a fatal heart attack. Now there is another shadow cast on Sydney as speculation grows that he acted in a threatening manner and intentionally caused her death.

Sydney eventually travels to Brighton, where he deduces Alicia has been staying, and manages to find her and Edward. He does not confront her, however, or alert the police. Instead, after the sale of his and Alex's serial is postponed due to Sydney's notoriety - he experiences a similar setback with his novel - he sends her a letter imploring her to give herself up. Alicia becomes distraught, and, after a hysterical fight with Edward, runs from their house. The next morning, police find Alicia's body at the bottom of a cliff. On his way to a meeting with police, Sydney stops first at Edward Tilbury's London flat and, hoping it will look like suicide, forces Tilbury to overdose on sleeping pills. During the subsequent police appointment, it is fairly clear they are leaning toward believing that Alicia killed herself; the call comes that Tilbury has been found unresponsive. Sydney's plan succeeds, even though a neighbour reports she saw him entering the flat before Tilbury's death. Sydney admits he visited the man, in order to hear from him the real story of how Alicia died. Due to lack of evidence that he had menaced or harmed Tilbury and, in spite of the lead investigator's heavy suspicion, Sydney is cleared.

== Reception ==
In The New York Times, Anthony Boucher wrote: "It's a curious and absorbing novel, almost unique in its fantastic and ironic tone".

Highsmith's biographer Andrew Wilson calls this work "the author's most postmodern novel" and describes it as "a literary hall of mirrors in which reality and fiction are constantly reflected and, ultimately, confused".

== Adaptations ==
A radio dramatization by James Saunders, directed by Richard Wortley, was first broadcast by BBC Radio 4 on 12 November 1983 in the Saturday Night Theatre slot. The tapes of the broadcast were lost for 40 years, but then rediscovered and re-broadcast in September 2024. An audiobook narrated by Simon Vance was issued in 2015 by Blackstone Audio.
