= Geraldo Carneiro =

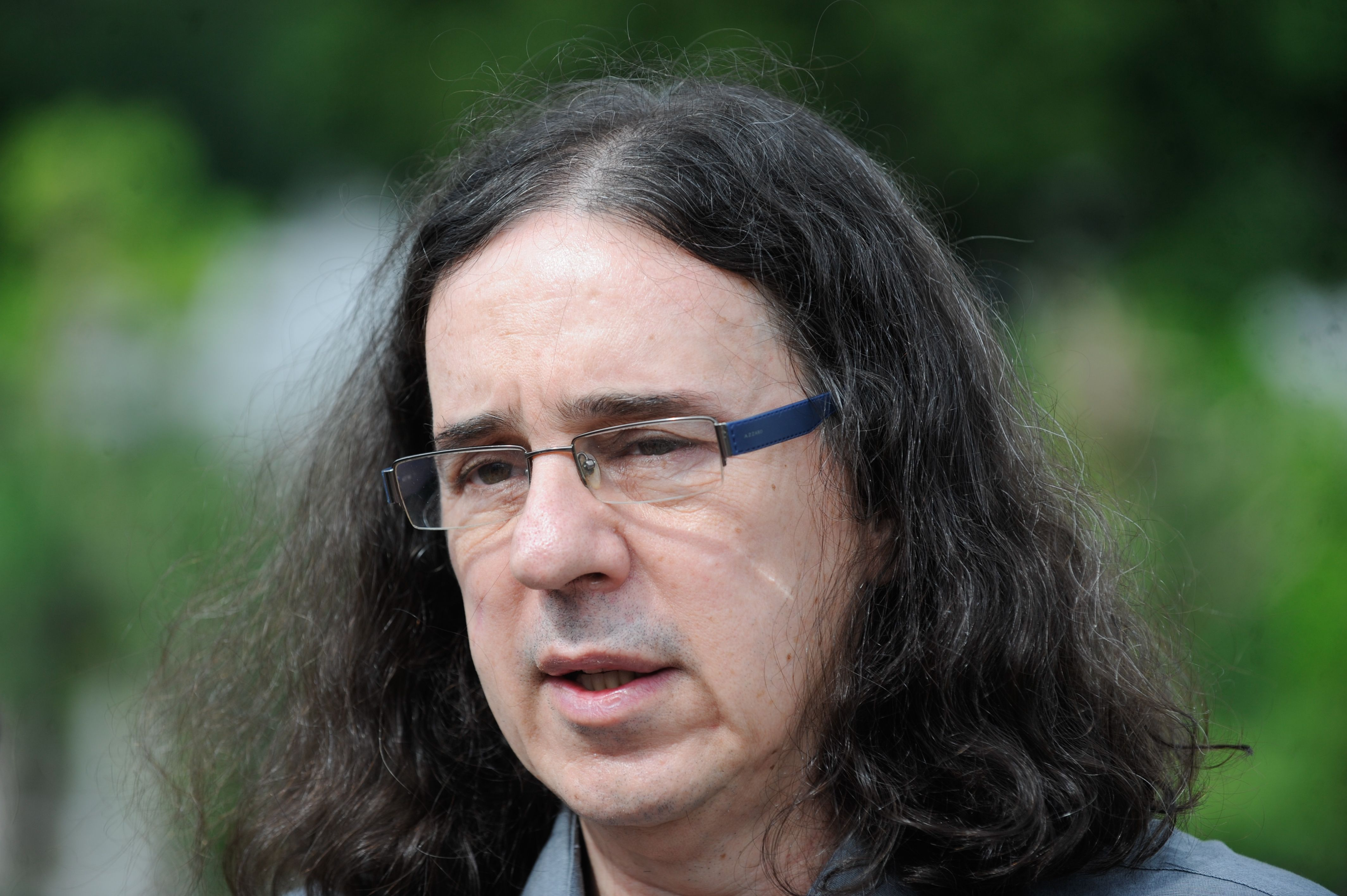
Geraldo Carneiro

Geraldo Carneiro (born 11 June 1952) is a Brazilian musician, writer and screenwriter.

== Life and career ==
Carneiro was born in Belo Horizonte. In his youth he dedicated himself to music, as a member of the band A Barca do Sol, together with his brother Nando Carneiro, Ritchie and others; he was also the composer and/or lyricist of numerous songs, including Choro de Nada, recorded initially by Vinicius de Moraes and Toquinho in 1975, and then by Antônio Carlos Jobim and Miúcha. He has also collaborated with many other musical artists: Egberto Gismonti, Astor Piazzolla, John Neschling, Francis Hime, Wagner Tiso, Ney Matogrosso, Lenine, Michel Legrand, Olivia Byington, Zé Renato, Cauby Peixoto, Fafá de Belém, Leila Pinheiro, Gal Costa, As Frenéticas, Jane Duboc, and Zezé Motta.

He actively participated in the literary movement of the so-called "poesia marginal" (marginal poetry), making his debut in this field with a collection of verses while still a student of Literature at the Pontifical Catholic University of Rio de Janeiro. He later published the books Verão Vagabundo (1980), Piquenique em (1995), Por Mares Nunca Dantes (2000), Lira dos Cinquent'anos (2002), Balada do Impostor (2006) and Poesia Reunida (2010).

For the theater he wrote, among other things, Lola Moreno, in collaboration with Bráulio Pedroso, and Além Bons Amigos, together with Miguel Falabella; he has also translated Shakespeare's The Tempest and Antony and Cleopatra, as well as texts by Frank Wedekind.

He has written screenplays for films and television works. In 2011 he signed, together with Alcides Nogueira, the telenovela O Astro - a remake of Magia by Janete Clair - which later won the Emmy Award.

Since 2016 he has been a member of the Brazilian Academy of Letters.
