= Storytelling (Naná Vasconcelos album) =

Studio album by Naná Vasconcelos
- Released: 1995
- Label: Hemisphere
- Producer: Naná Vasconcelos

Naná Vasconcelos chronology
Rain Dance (1989)	Storytelling (1995)	Fragments Modern Tradition (1997)

Storytelling is an album by the Brazilian musician Naná Vasconcelos. It was released in 1995.

== Production ==
Recorded in 1992 and 1993, the album was produced in part by Vasconcelos. Many of the songs are about the Amazon rainforest; others are semi-autobiographical. Vasconcelos added found sounds to the music. He employed more electronic effects than on previous albums, although he still made use of the berimbau. "Curtain" was cowritten by the Ambitious Lovers' Peter Scherer.

== Critical reception ==
Professional ratings
Review scores
Source	Rating
AllMusic	3/5 stars
The Encyclopedia of Popular Music	3/5 stars
MusicHound World: The Essential Album Guide	4/5 stars
Orange County Register	4/5 stars

The Guardian wrote: "There are string quartets, choirs, children's voices, the berimbau, gongs, accordions, talking drums, the works. The atmosphere he evokes is of the street-corner, the forest, cattle in fields. It isn't jazz, but Vasconcelos is an improviser to the tips of his fingers, and understands the impulses of improvisers from whatever roots they spring." The Orange County Register deemed the album "a mesmerizing blend of Afro-Brazilian-jazz-global grooves"; it later named it one of the best albums of 1995. The Omaha World-Herald opined that "some samba rhythms provide brief interest, but mostly the music wanders somewhat aimlessly."

AllMusic called the music "often sweet and charming, and just as often thoughtful and engaging—never boring, annoying, or mediocre; it's also impossible to pigeonhole." The Miami Herald labeled Storytelling "beautiful," writing that "Vasconcelos takes listeners on an ambient journey deep into the Amazon."

== Track listing ==
No.	Title	Length
1.	"Curtain / Cortina"
2.	"Fui Fuio (Na Praça)"
3.	"An Afternoon in the North / Uma Tarde no Norte"
4.	"A Day in the Amazon / Um Dia no Amazonas"
5.	"Clementina (No Terreiro)"
6.	"Wind Calling Wind / Vento Chamando Vento"
7.	"You Don't Want to Know / Tu Nem Quer Saber"
8.	"Northeast / Nordeste"
9.	"Tiroleo"
10.	"Night of Stars / Noite das Estrellas"
