= Ana Cristina Cesar =

Brazilian poet, literary critic and translator

Ana Cristina César
- Ana Cristina Cesar in 1982
- Born: June 2, 1952; Rio de Janeiro, Brazil
- Died: October 29, 1983 (aged 31); Rio de Janeiro, Brazil
- Writing career
- Pen name: Ana C.
- Genre: Poetry

Ana Cristina César (June 2, 1952 – October 29, 1983) was a Brazilian poet, literary critic and translator from Rio de Janeiro. She came from a middle-class Protestant background and was usually known as "Ana C." She had written since childhood and developed a strong interest in English literature. She spent some time in England in 1968 and, on returning to Brazil, she became a published author of note. The 1970s and early 1980s were the peak of her poetic career.

She is considered one of the main names of the mimeograph generation, also known as the marginal poetry of the 1970s.

She returned to England in 1983. One of the authors she admired was Sylvia Plath. She shared some commonalities with her in temperament and fate. She died in 1983 by jumping out of a window at her parents´ apartment in Rio de Janeiro.

== Principal works ==
=== Poetry ===
- A Teus Pés [At Your Feet]
- Inéditos e Dispersos [Inedited and Dispersed]
- Novas Seletas [New Anthology] (posthumous, put out by Armando Freitas Filho)

=== Criticism ===
- Crítica e Tradução [Criticism and Translation]
