= Heloísa Teixeira =

Brazilian literary critic (1939–2025)

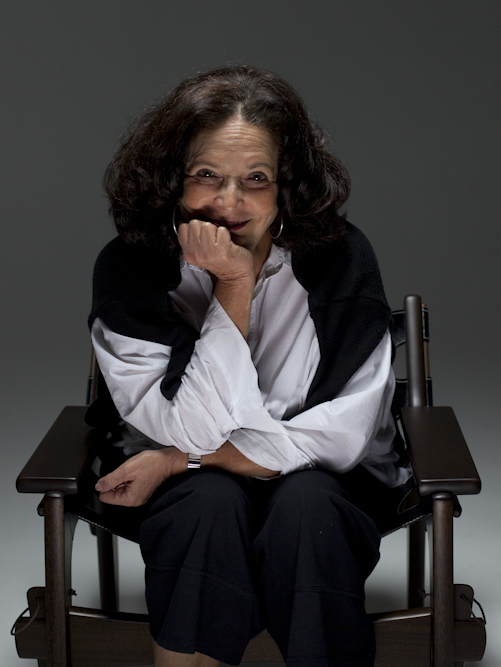
- Teixeira in 2010
- Born: 26 July 1939; Ribeirão Preto, São Paulo, Brazil
- Died: 28 March 2025 (aged 85); Rio de Janeiro, Brazil
- Education: Pontifical Catholic University of Rio de Janeiro; Federal University of Rio de Janeiro
- Occupations: Writer, essayist, editor, literary critic
- Writing career
- Notable work: 26 poetas hoje

Heloísa Teixeira (26 July 1939 – 28 March 2025), formerly known as Heloísa Buarque de Hollanda, was a Brazilian writer, essayist, editor and literary critic whose research activity focused on the relationship between culture and development, particularly with regard to poetry, feminism, gender and ethnic relations, marginalized cultures, and digital culture.

== Life and career ==
Teixeira was born in Ribeirão Preto on 26 July 1939. She graduated in classic literature at the Pontifical Catholic University of Rio de Janeiro, had a master's degree and a doctorate in Brazilian literature from the Federal University of Rio de Janeiro, where she was professor emerita of theory of culture, and a postgrad at Columbia University. In the 80s she was named director of Museu da Imagem e do Som do Rio de Janeiro by Darcy Ribeiro.

Among the works she wrote or edited are the books 26 poetas hoje (1975), an anthology of Brazilian underground poets from the mimeograph generation, and As 29 poetas hoje (2021), an anthology of women poets; the series Pensamento Feminista Hoje; Asdrúbal Trouxe o Trombone – memórias de uma trupe solitária de comediantes que abalou os anos 70; Rachel, Rachel; Explosão Feminista; Cultura e Participação nos anos 60; and Pós-Modernismo e Política.

On 20 April 2023, she was elected as the 30th chair of the Brazilian Academy of Letters, succeeding Nélida Piñon. She was the 10th woman in the history of the Academy to be elected.

=== Personal life and death ===
Teixeira was married twice – first to the lawyer and gallery owner Luiz Buarque de Hollanda, a relative of Chico Buarque; she had three sons with him. Her second husband was the photographer João Carlos Horta; they were married for over 50 years, until Horta's death in 2020. In July 2023, Heloísa announced that she would reject the surname Buarque de Hollanda, and return to her maiden name Teixeira.

In 2024, Teixeira was diagnosed with pancreatic cancer.

Teixeira died in Rio de Janeiro on 28 March 2025, at the age of 85. She had been hospitalized with pneumonia. President Lula da Silva expressed his condolences upon her death. Actress Fernanda Torres also paid her respects to Teixeira.
