= Eventyr =

Studio album by Jan Garbarek
- Released: September 1981
- Recorded: December 1980
- Studio: Talent Studio; Oslo, Norway
- Length: 56:08
- Label: ECM; ECM 1200
- Producer: Manfred Eicher

Jan Garbarek chronology
Folk Songs (1981)	Eventyr (1981)	Paths, Prints (1982)

Eventyr is an album by Norwegian jazz saxophonist and composer Jan Garbarek recorded in December 1980 and released on ECM September the following year. The trio features guitarist John Abercrombie and percussionist Naná Vasconcelos.

== Reception ==
The AllMusic review awarded the album 2½ stars.

The Penguin Guide to Jazz awarded the album three stars.

Professional ratings
Review scores
Source	Rating
AllMusic	2.5/5 stars
The Penguin Guide to Jazz	3/4 stars
The Rolling Stone Jazz Record Guide	3/5 stars

== Track listing ==
All compositions by Jan Garbarek, John Abercrombie and Naná Vasconcelos except as indicated

1. "Soria Maria" - 11:39
2. "Lillekort" - 5:02
3. "Eventyr" - 9:19
4. "Weaving a Garland" (Traditional) - 2:20
5. "Once upon a Time" - 9:02
6. "The Companion" (Garbarek, Vasconcelos) - 5:49
7. "Snipp, Snapp, Snute" (Garbarek, Vasconcelos) - 4:30
8. "East of the Sun and West of the Moon" - 8:27

== Personnel ==
- Jan Garbarek – soprano and tenor saxophones, flutes
- John Abercrombie – guitars
- Naná Vasconcelos – berimbau, talking drum, percussion, voice
