= Zulmira Ribeiro Tavares =

Zulmira Ribeiro Tavares (1930-2018) was a Brazilian poet and writer. She was born in São Paulo. She is best known for her 1990 novella Joias de família, which won the Premio Jabuti. It was translated into English by Daniel Hahn. Her other titles include O japonês dos olhos redondos (1982), O nome do bispo (1985), and O mandril (1988).

She also won the Premio Jabuti prize for poetry in 2012.
