= Dança das cabeças =

Studio album by Egberto Gismonti
- Released: 1977
- Recorded: November 1976
- Studio: Talent Studio; Oslo, Norway
- Genre: Jazz
- Length: 49:51
- Label: ECM; ECM 1089 ST
- Producer: Manfred Eicher

Egberto Gismonti chronology
Academia de danças (1974)	Dança das cabeças (1977)	Sol do meio dia (1977)

Dança das cabeças (Portuguese: "Head Dance") is an album by Brazilian composer, guitarist and pianist Egberto Gismonti recorded in November 1976 and released on ECM the following year—his debut for the label. Naná Vasconcelos backs on percussion.

== Reception ==
Professional ratings
Review scores
Source	Rating
AllMusic	4/5 stars

The AllMusic review by Álvaro Neder states:

A landmark of the careers of Gismonti and percussionist Naná Vasconcelos, his only accompanist here. Recorded in only three days, the album's concept is based on the history shared by both musicians, according to Gismonti: two boys wandering through a dense, humid forest, full of insects and animals, keeping a 180-feet distance from each other. The album received several international awards, in England, U.S., Germany, and Brazil. It also changed both artists' lives: Naná immediately became an undisputed international artist, touring worldwide; Egberto returned to Brazil, decided to research Amazon folklore, which would be reflected in his later work. The music is pure and sensitive, challenging and sophisticated, with a broad dynamic range going from haunting, mysterious melodies to full-impact, energetic percussive sounds reminiscent of Brazilian Indians' batuque.

== Track listing ==
All tracks are written by Egberto Gismonti, except as noted.

Side I
No.	Title	Writer(s)	Length
1.	"Part I": "Quarto mundo No. 1"; "Dança das cabeças"; "Águas luminosas"; "Celebração de núpcias"; "Porta encantada"; "Quarto mundo No. 2"	D. Bressane	25:21

Side II
No.	Title	Writer(s)	Length
1.	"Part II": "Tango"; "Bambuzal"; "Fé cega, faca amolada"; "Dança solitária"	Gismonti; G. E. Carneiro; Milton Nascimento; R. Bastos	24:30

== Personnel ==
=== Musicians ===
- Egberto Gismonti – 8-string guitar, piano, wooden flutes, voice
- Naná Vasconcelos – percussion, berimbau, body percussion, voice

=== Technical personnel ===
- Manfred Eicher – producer
- Jan Erik Kongshaug – recording engineer
- Dieter Bonhorst – layout
- Lajos Keresztes – cover photography
