= In Montreal =

Live album by Charlie Haden and Egberto Gismonti
- Released: September 3, 2001
- Recorded: July 6, 1989
- Venue: Université du Québec, Quebec City, Quebec, Canada
- Genre: Jazz
- Length: 78:55
- Label: ECM
- Producer: Manfred Eicher

Charlie Haden chronology
Nocturne (2001)	In Montreal (2001)	American Dreams (2002)

Egberto Gismonti chronology
Meeting Point (1997)	In Montreal (2001)	Corações Futuristas (2001)

In Montreal is an album by bassist Charlie Haden and guitarist/pianist Egberto Gismonti, recorded in 1989 at the Montreal International Jazz Festival and released on ECM Records in 2001.

== Reception ==
The AllMusic review by David R. Adler stated, "Bassist Charlie Haden has done a tremendous amount of playing in duo contexts. This live recording with the remarkable pianist/guitarist Egberto Gismonti is a fine addition to his duo resumé".

Professional ratings
Review scores
Source	Rating
AllMusic	3/5 stars
The Penguin Guide to Jazz Recordings	4/4 stars

== Track listing ==
1. "Salvador" (Egberto Gismonti) - 7:36
2. "Maracatú" (Egberto Gismonti) - 9:21
3. "First Song" (Charlie Haden) - 6:28
4. "Palhaço" (G. E. Carneiro, Egberto Gismonti) - 9:19
5. "Silence" (Charlie Haden) - 9:48
6. "Em Família" (Egberto Gismonti) - 10:03
7. "Lôro" (Egberto Gismonti) - 7:31
8. "Frevo" (Egberto Gismonti) - 6:43
9. "Don Quixote" (G. E. Carneiro, Egberto Gismonti) - 12:02
- Recorded at the Festival International de Jazz de Montréal on July 6, 1989

== Personnel ==
- Charlie Haden — double bass
- Egberto Gismonti — guitar, piano
