= Rossella Brescia =

Italian television presenter

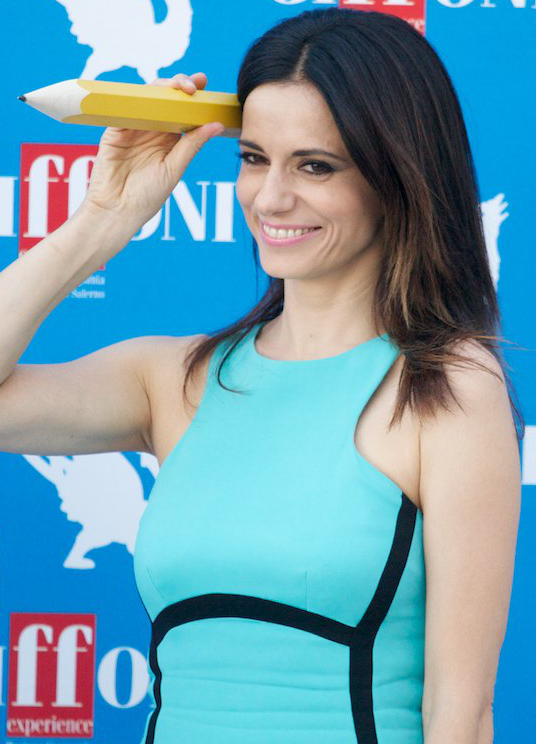
- Rossella Brescia (2012)
- Born: 20 August 1971 (age 54); Martina Franca, Italy
- Occupations: Television presenter; radio presenter; dancer; actress

Rossella Brescia (born 20 August 1971) is an Italian television presenter, radio presenter, and dancer. She has hosted Uman – Take Control! on Italia 1 and Baila! on Canale 5, among many others.

== Filmography ==
=== As an actress ===
Year	Title	Role	Notes
2004	Don Matteo	Veronica Mari	Episode: "I volteggi del cuore"
2009	Così fan tutte	Rossella/ Various	Sketch comedy
2010	Transformice	Cappotto (voice)	Short film
2012	Benvenuti a tavola - Nord vs. Sud	Veronica Abbiati	Main role (season 1); 16 episodes
2018	Show Dogs	Rossella, the dog (voice)	Italian voice-over role
2019	Tutta un'altra vita	Rich woman	Cameo appearance
2019	Toy Story 4	Flying dancer (voice)	Italian voice-over role
2019	Road to the Lemon Grove	Maria	
2022	Giustizia per tutti	Gabriella	Episode: "Pilot"

=== As herself ===
Year	Title	Role	Notes
1995	Un disco per l'estate 1995	Herself/ Dancer	Annual music festival
1995	Cuori e denari	Herself/ Dancer	Variety show
1997	Sotto a chi tocca	Herself/ Dancer	Game show (season 2)
1997–2002	Buona Domenica	Herself/ Dancer	Variety show (seasons 10–14)
2000–2002	C'è posta per te	Herself/ Reporter	Reality show (seasons 1–5)
2002–2003	Amici di Maria De Filippi	Herself/ Dance teacher	Talent show (season 2)
2004–2010	Colorado	Herself/ Host	Variety show (seasons 2–10)
2008	2008 Wind Music Awards	Herself/ Host	Annual ceremony
2008	Miss Muretto	Herself/ Judge	Beauty contest
2011	Buddy, il mio migliore amico	Herself/ Host	Docu-drama series
2011	Uman: Take Control	Herself/ Host	Reality show
2011	Baila!	Herself/ Judge	Talent show
2012	Mammoni: Chi vuole sposare mio figlio?	Herself/ Host	Reality show
2016	Capodanno con Gigi D'Alessio	Herself	Special
2017	Piccoli giganti	Herself/ Coach	Talent show (season 2)
2017	2017 Castrocaro Music Festival	Herself/ Host	Annual ceremony
2017–2018	RDS Academy	Herself/ Host	Talent show (seasons 4–5)
2019	Prodigi - La musica è vita	Herself/ Judge	Talent show (season 4)
