= Egberto Gismonti =

Brazilian composer, guitarist and pianist (born 1947)

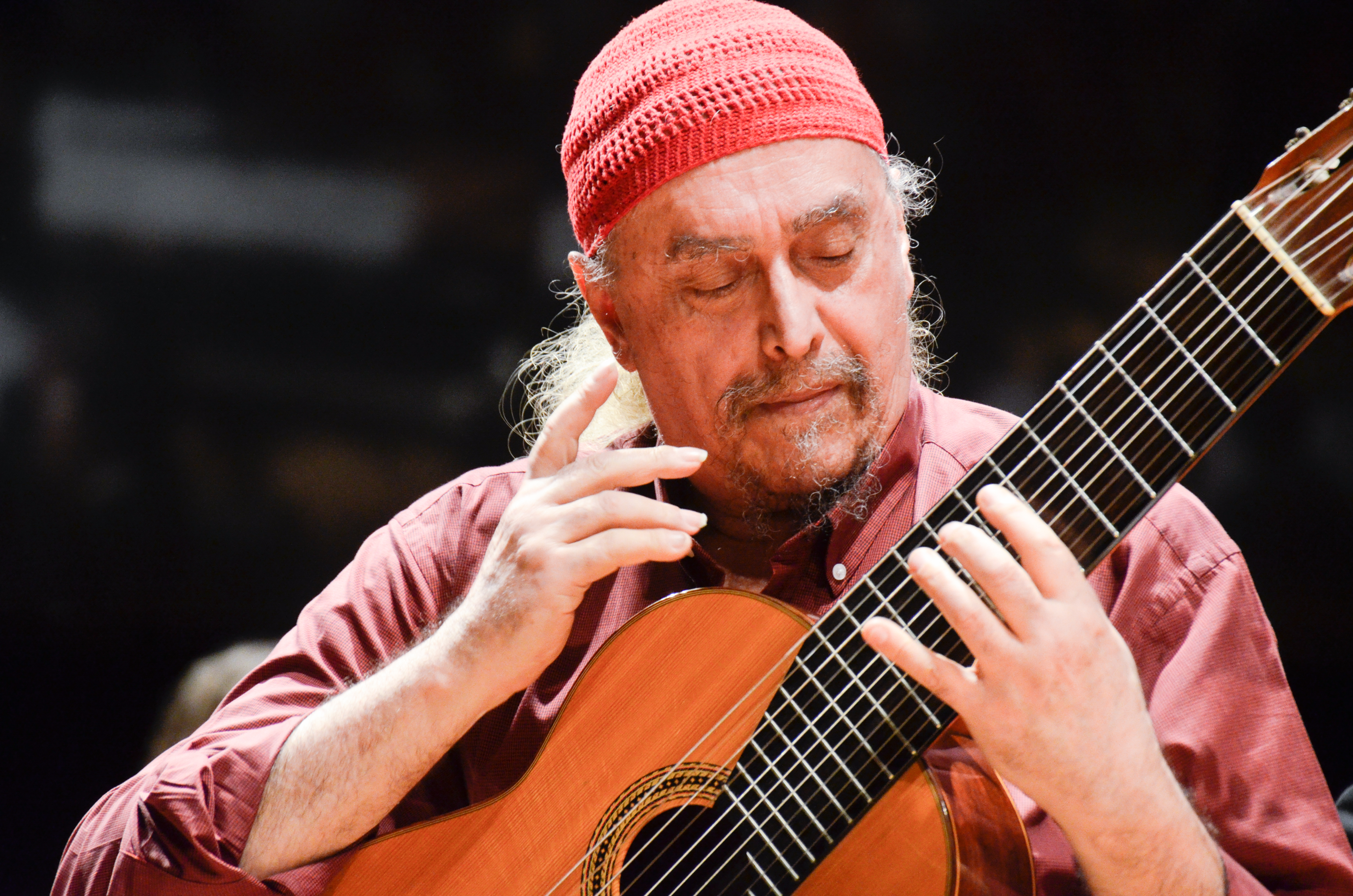
- Gismonti in Buenos Aires, 2017.

Background information
- Born: Egberto Amin Gismonti; 5 December 1947 (age 78); Carmo, Rio de Janeiro, Brazil
- Genres: brazilian music, jazz, world music, Contemporary classical music,
- Occupations: Musician, songwriter
- Instruments: 8-string guitar, 10 string guitar, piano, wood flutes, kalimba, Indian organ
- Years active: 1969–present
- Labels: ECM, EMI
- Website: Egberto Gismonti

Egberto Amin Gismonti (born 5 December 1947) is a Brazilian composer, guitarist and pianist.

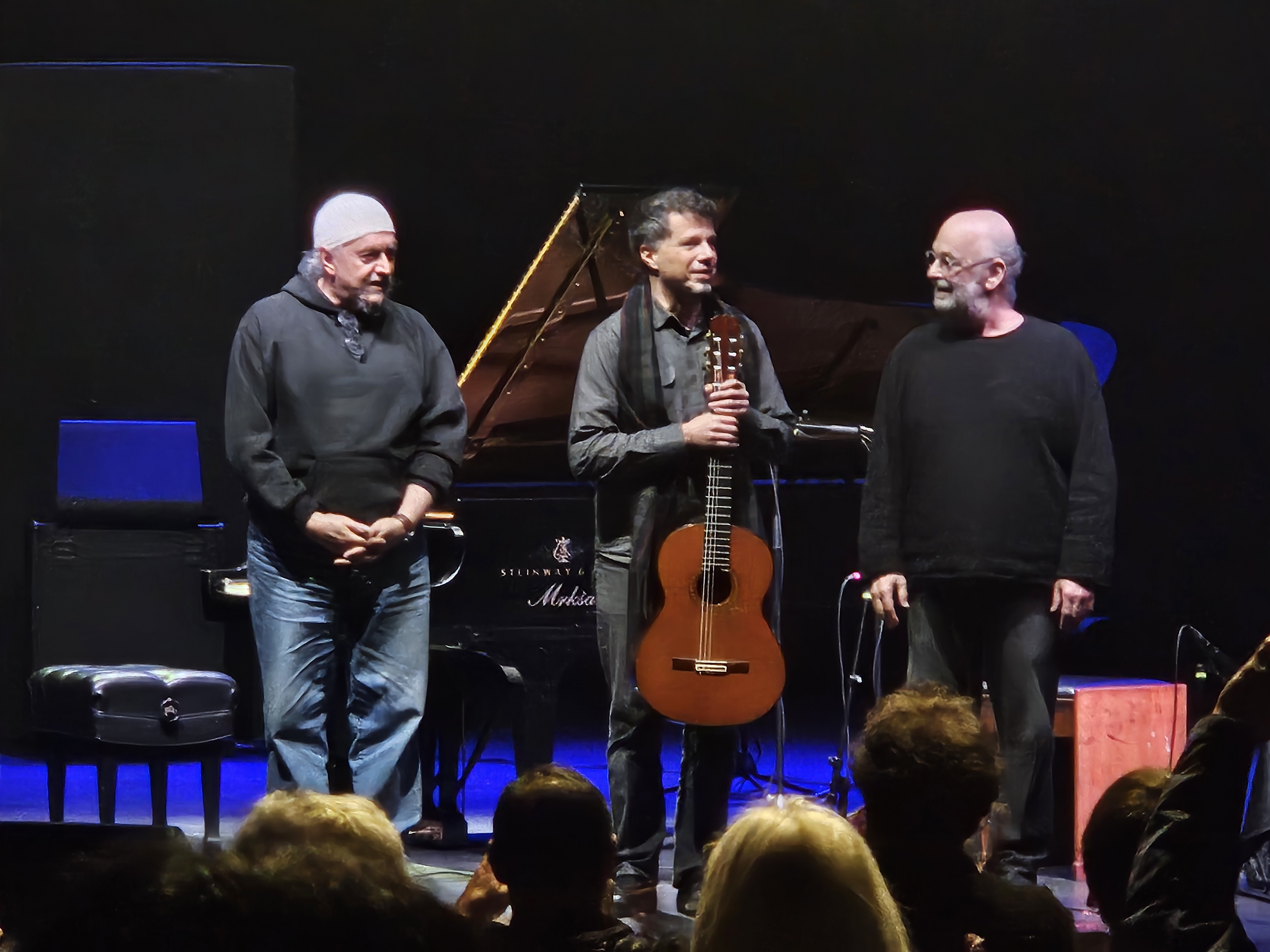
Next to Jaques Morelenbaum and Daniel Murray in Santiago, Chile in 2025

== Biography ==
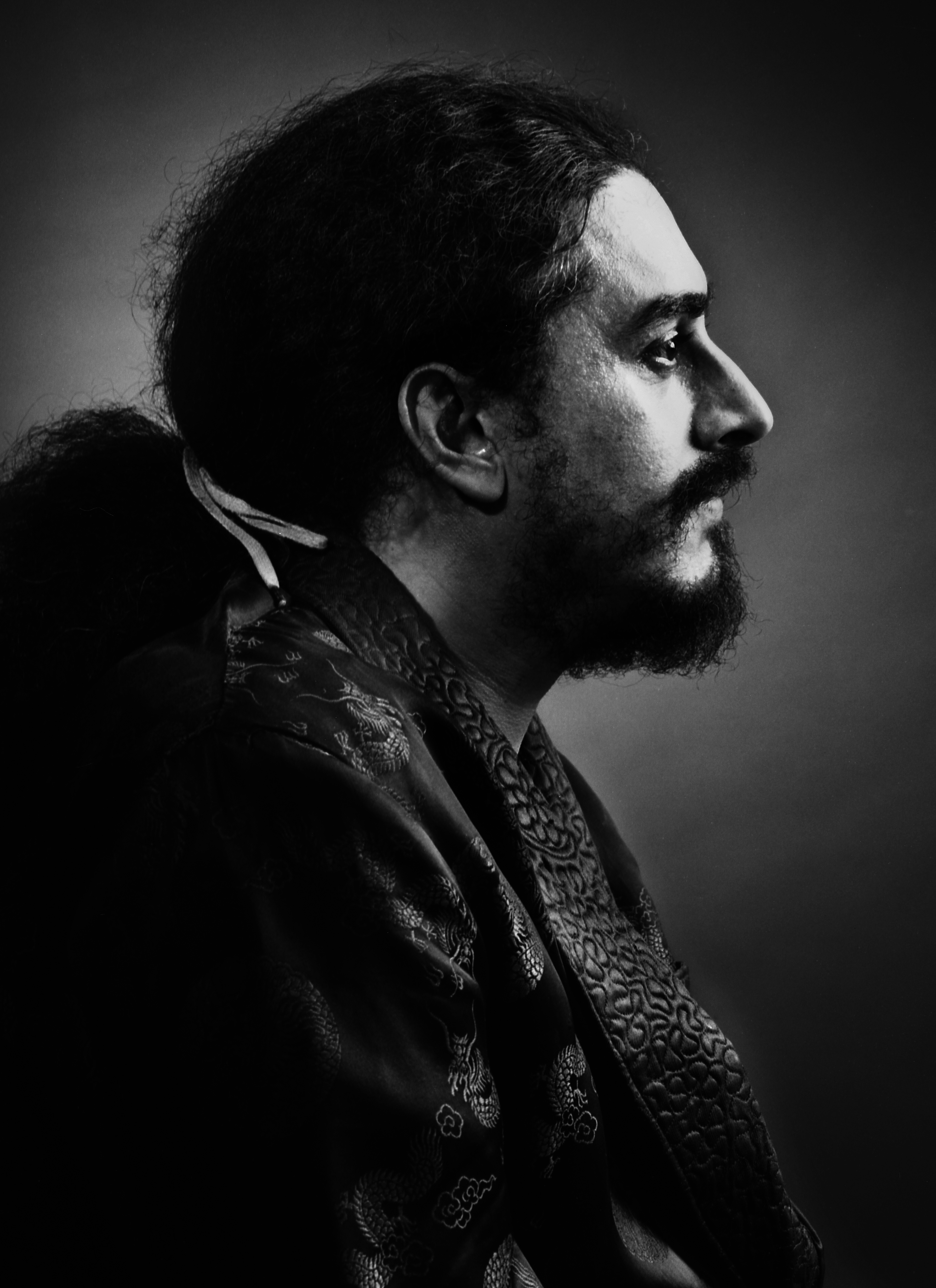
Gismonti - portrait by Gert Chesi

Gismonti was born in the small city of Carmo, state of Rio de Janeiro, Brazil, into a musical family. His mother was from Sicily and his father was from Beirut, Lebanon. At the age of six, he started studying the piano at the Brazilian Conservatory of Music. After studying the classical repertoire in Brazil for 15 years, he went to Paris, France, to delve into modern music. He studied with Nadia Boulanger (1887–1979), after acceptance as a student by the composer Jean Barraqué, a student of Anton Webern and Schoenberg. Boulanger encouraged Gismonti to write the collective Brazilian experience into his music.

Gismonti is a self-taught guitarist. After returning to Brazil, he designed guitars with more than six strings, expanding the possibilities of the instrument. Approaching the fretboard as if it were a keyboard, Gismonti gives the impression that there is more than a single guitar player. Gismonti's sojourn in the Xingu region of the Amazon basin made a lasting impression. This is documented musically in tunes such as "Yualapeti" and "Sapain" (Yualapeti shaman, Sapain) and in the recordings Dança das Cabeças ("Dance of the Heads", 1977), Sol do Meio-Dia ("Noon Sun", 1978), which he dedicated to the Xingu, and Duas Vozes ("Two Voices", 1984).

The musical career of Gismonti spans five decades. The major phases are distinguished by record company, the ensemble format, and the musical collaborators. The most important ensembles are his Brazilian group Academia de Danças, including Mauro Senise (saxophone and flutes), Zeca Assumpção (bass) and Nenê (Realcino Lima Filho, drums and percussion), the duo with Naná Vasconcelos (percussion), and the trio with Charlie Haden (bass) and Jan Garbarek (saxophone). Dança das Cabecas, the first ECM record, was nominated "Album of the Year" by Stereo Review and received the 1977 Großer Deutscher Schallplattenpreis.

In 1978 he founded the music label Carmo, which has had several joint ventures with ECM.

== Discography ==
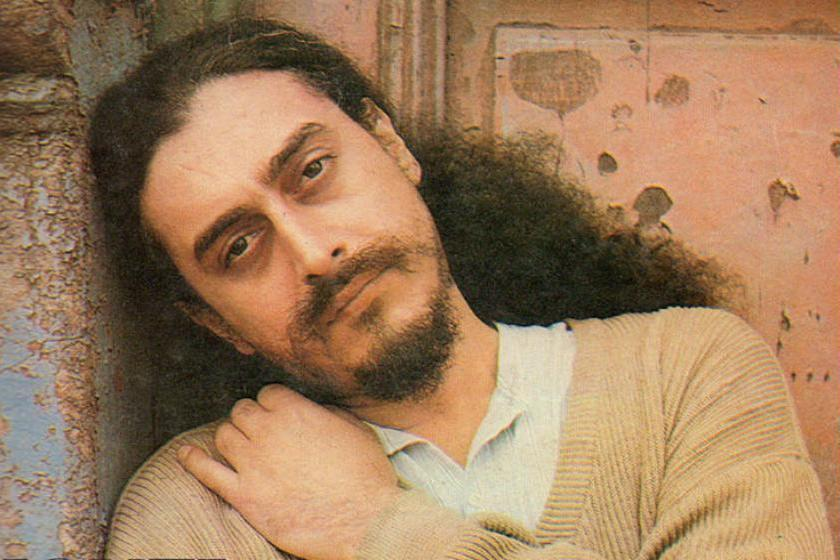
Gismonti in 1980

- Egberto Gismonti (Elenco, 1969)
- Sonho '70 (Polydor, 1970)
- Orfeo Novo (MPS, 1970)
- Água e Vinho (EMI-Odeon, 1972)
- Egberto Gismonti (EMI-Odeon, 1973)
- Árvore (Decca/ECM, 1973)
- Academia de Danças (EMI, 1974)
- Corações Futuristas (Odeon, 1976)
- Carmo (EMI, 1977)
- Dança das Cabeças, with Naná Vasconcelos (ECM, 1977)
- Nó Caipira (Odeon, 1978)
- Sol do Meio Dia (ECM, 1978)
- Solo (ECM, 1979)
- Mágico, with Charlie Haden and Jan Garbarek (ECM, 1980)
- Circense (EMI, 1980)
- Folk Songs (ECM, 1981)
- Sanfona, with Academia de Dancas (ECM, 1981)[2LP]
- Em Família (EMI, 1981)
- Fantasia (EMI, 1982)
- Cidade Coração (EMI, 1983)
- Duas Vozes, with Naná Vasconcelos (ECM, 1985)
- Trem Caipira (1985)
- Live at Berlin Jazzbühne Jazz Festival (1984)
- Alma (1986)
- O Pagador de Promessas (1988)
- Dança dos Escravos (ECM, 1989)
- Feixe de Luz (1988)
- Presents a Musical Childhood with Infância (1990)
- Amazônia (1991)
- Kuarup (Carmo, 1991)
- Infância (ECM, 1991)
- Casa das Andorinhas (1992)
- Música de Sobrevivência (1993)
- Brasil Musical (1993)
- Zig Zag (ECM, 1995)
- Forrobodó (Carmo, 1996)
- Violão (Carmo, 1996)
- Meeting Point (ECM, 1997)
- In Montreal, with Charlie Haden (ECM, 2001)
- Retratos (EMI, 2004)
- Saudações (ECM, 2009)
- Mágico: Carta de Amor, with Jan Garbarek and Charlie Haden (ECM, 2012)
