= Blue sun (disambiguation) =

Blue sun may refer to:

- A star with a suitable spectral type O
- Blue Sun (album), a 1982 album by Ralph Towner
- Blue Sun (album), a 2017 album by Jack Nunn on Atlantic Jaxx records
- Blue Sun Corporation, a fictional corporation in the Firefly television series
