= Open letter (disambiguation) =

An open letter is a letter that is intended to be read by a wide audience.

Open Letter may also refer to:

- Open Letter (Loose Tubes album), 1988
- Open Letter (Case album)
- Open Letter (Ralph Towner album)
- "Open Letter" (Jay-Z song), 2013
- "Open Letter", a 2018 song by Lil Wayne from Tha Carter V
- Open Letter Books, an American publisher owned by the University of Rochester specializing in translated works

== See also ==
- "Open Letter (To a Landlord)", a song by the New York City band Living Colour from their 1988 debut album Vivid
