= Slide show (disambiguation) =

A slide show, or slideshow, is an on-screen presentation of information/ideas presented on slides.

Slide show or slideshow may also refer to:

- SlideShow (TV series), a 2013 Australian television comedy game show
- Slide Show (album), an album by guitarist Ralph Towner
- Slideshows (album), the second album by Australian band Thirsty Merc
