= At First Light (Ralph Towner album) =

Studio album by Ralph Towner
- Released: 2023
- Recorded: February 2022
- Studios: Auditorio Stelio Molo RSI; Lugano, Switzerland
- Genre: Jazz
- Length: 44:01
- Labels: ECM; ECM 2516
- Producer: Manfred Eicher

Ralph Towner chronology
My Foolish Heart (2016)	At First Light (2023)

At First Light is a solo album by American guitarist Ralph Towner, recorded in February 2022, Auditorio Stelio Molo RSI, Lugano; and released on ECM.

== Reception ==
Chris Pearson of The Times wrote of this album,

Ralph Towner, returning to the solo format he first employed 50 years ago. […] He may be physically alone on his album, yet he has the ghostly accompaniment of many forebears. He plays classical guitar here, but has a background in trumpet and piano, and his originals have 'trace elements' of everyone from John Dowland to John Coltrane. […] On 'Danny Boy', he makes the most of every beautiful note.

George W. Harris of Jazz Weekly wrote,

It’s albums like this that make you fall in love with both acoustic guitars and ECM Records. Playing classical guitar, Ralph Towner plays with the wisdom of Geppetto as he carves living beings out of wood on this album of eleven solo pieces. Only a master like Towner can use silence as a sound so well, as on the patiently lyrical take of 'Danny Boy', the romantic 'Argentinian Nights' and the ebullient 'Flow'. There’s a playful cadence to 'Ubi Sunt' and joy reflected on 'Little Old Lady'. Intimate, quiet and completely at ease within its own skin.

== Track listing ==
All compositions by Ralph Towner except as indicated

No.	Title	Length
1.	"Flow" (Jule Styne, Adolph Green, Betty Comdon)	5:06
2.	"Strait" (Traditional)	4:56
3.	"Make Someone Happy" (Hoagy Carmichael, Stanley Adams)	3:53
4.	"Ubi Sunt"	4:46
5.	"Guitarra Piccante"	4:25
6.	"At First Light"	4:44
7.	"Danny Boy"	3:40
8.	"Fat Foot"	3:58
9.	"Argentinian Nights"	1:41
10.	"Little Old Lady"	3:17
11.	"Empty Stage"	3:42

== Personnel ==
- Ralph Towner — classical guitar, 12 string guitar
