= Anthem (Ralph Towner album) =

Studio album by Ralph Towner
- Released: March 2001
- Recorded: February 2000
- Studios: Rainbow Studio; Oslo, Norway
- Genre: Jazz
- Length: 50:44
- Labels: ECM; ECM 1743
- Producer: Manfred Eicher

Ralph Towner chronology
Ana (1997)	Anthem (2001)	Time Line (2006)

Anthem is a solo album by American jazz guitarist Ralph Towner recorded in February 2000 and released on ECM in March 2001.

== Reception ==
Professional ratings
Review scores
Source	Rating
AllMusic	4.5/5 stars
The Penguin Guide to Jazz Recordings	3/4 stars

The AllMusic review by Thom Jurek awarded the album 4½ stars, stating, "Anthem is Towner's finest album in a decade and one of the finest in his distinguished career."

== Track listing ==
All compositions by Ralph Towner, except as noted.

1. "Solitary Woman" - 6:57
2. "Anthem" - 4:54
3. "Haunted" - 3:08
4. "The Lutemaker" - 4:21
5. "Simone" - 6:03
6. "Gloria's Step" (Scott LaFaro) - 2:51
7. "Four Comets Part 1" - 1:06
8. "Four Comets Part 2" - 1:12
9. "Four Comets Part 3" - 1:02
10. "Four Comets Part 4" - 0:52
11. "Raffish" - 4:14
12. "Very Late" - 4:02
13. "The Prowler" - 5:01
14. "Three Comments Part 1" - 1:32
15. "Three Comments Part 2" - 0:31
16. "Three Comments Part 3" - 0:54
17. "Goodbye Pork Pie Hat" (Charles Mingus) - 1:54

== Personnel ==
- Ralph Towner – classical guitar, 12 string guitar
