= Matchbook (Ralph Towner & Gary Burton album) =

Studio album by Ralph Towner & Gary Burton
- Released: 1975
- Recorded: July 26–27, 1974
- Studio: Tonstudio Bauer; Ludwigsburg, W. Germany
- Genre: Jazz
- Length: 38:58
- Label: ECM 1056 ST
- Producer: Manfred Eicher

Ralph Towner chronology
Diary (1973)	Matchbook (1975)	Solstice (1975)

Gary Burton chronology
Ring (1974)	Matchbook (1975)	Dreams So Real (1976)

Matchbook is an album by guitarist Ralph Towner and vibraphonist Gary Burton, recorded over two days in July 1974 and released on ECM the following year.

== Reception ==
Professional ratings
Review scores
Source	Rating
AllMusic	4.5/5 stars
DownBeat	5/5 stars
The Penguin Guide to Jazz Recordings	3/4 stars
The Rolling Stone Jazz Record Guide	4/5 stars

Scott Yanow, in a review for AllMusic, noted that the pairing of Towner and Burton was "a logical matchup, since both musicians are open to folk melodies and are generally quiet improvisers". However, he also stated: "More tempo and mood variation would have uplifted the otherwise fine music."

In an article at Acoustic Guitar, Mark Kemp wrote: "In the early 1970s, ECM Records described its overall philosophy as 'the most beautiful sound next to silence.' This ECM collaboration... defined that philosophy. The nylon-string and vibes interplay... are the essence of chamber jazz: intimate, quiet, contemplative, and absolutely beautiful."

Tyran Grillo, writing for Between Sound and Space, commented: "A matchbook doesn't typically provide a surface for lasting statements. On its flap, one scrawls a phone number, an address, or any other piece of information as ephemeral as the flames for which it is mass-produced. Such is not the case with guitarist Ralph Towner and vibraphonist Gary Burton. Instead, we get indelible marks of grace and humility, each a brighter spark at the wick of our attention... The sound of this album is like no other and unfolds itself with the delicacy of a morning glory, yet with melodies as indestructible as the sunlight that sustains them. Its many colors are provided not only through finely wrought melodies, but also through a wealth of rhythmic variations throughout. If you like either of these artists apart, then you can’t go wrong with them together."

== Track listing ==
All tracks are written by Ralph Towner, except as noted.

Side I
No.	Title	Writer(s)	Length
1.	"Drifting Petals"		5:19
2.	"Some Other Time"	Leonard Bernstein; Betty Comden; Adolph Green	6:16
3.	"Brotherhood"	Gary Burton	1:12
4.	"Icarus"		5:53

Side II
No.	Title	Writer(s)	Length
1.	"Song for a Friend"		5:10
2.	"Matchbook"		4:34
3.	"1 × 6"		0:56
4.	"Aurora"		5:11
5.	"Goodbye Pork Pie Hat"	Charles Mingus	4:22

== Personnel ==
- Ralph Towner – twelve-string guitar, classical guitar
- Gary Burton – vibraphone
