= Just So Happens =

Studio album by Gary Peacock and Bill Frisell
- Released: October 19, 1994
- Recorded: February 17 and 18, 1994
- Studio: Electric Lady Studios, NYC; Sound on Sound Recording, NYC
- Genre: Jazz
- Length: 51:30
- Label: Postcards Records POST 1005
- Producer: Ralph Simon

Gary Peacock chronology
Oracle (1993)	Just So Happens (1994)	A Closer View (1995)

Professional ratings
Review scores
Source	Rating
Allmusic	3/5 stars
All About Jazz	3.5/5 stars

Just So Happens is a studio album by American jazz bassist Gary Peacock and guitarist Bill Frisell released on the Postcard Records label in 1994.

== Reception ==
David R. Adler of Allmusic wrote "Gary Peacock's duo album with Bill Frisell is rewarding, though a bit repetitive. Most interesting is the sonic contrast between Peacock's imposing upright bass and Frisell's quirky electric guitar. After eight tracks, however, the appearance of Frisell's acoustic guitar -- on the standard "Good Morning, Heartache"—comes as a welcome change. Most of the pieces are free improvisations, and while they all have their moments, some wind up treading water. "In Walked Po," an oblique take on the blues, is an exception. "Reciprocity" and "N.O.M.B." are the only originals credited solely to Peacock, leading one to believe they were written before the session. Perhaps not surprisingly, these two tracks are the most coherent on the record. The duo also plays two versions of "Home on the Range" (one would have sufficed), and Peacock renders "Red River Valley" as an unaccompanied solo. For Frisell, at least, this could have been a sign of things soon to come: His Nashville album was released about a year later."

== Track listing ==
No.	Title	Writer(s)	Length
1.	"Only Now"	Peacock	4:40
2.	"In Walked Po"	Peacock, Frisell	6:14
3.	"Wapitis Dream"	Peacock, Frisell	3:21
4.	"Home on the Range, No. 1"	Traditional	3:30
5.	"Home on the Range, No. 2"	Traditional	5:05
6.	"Through a Skylight"	Peacock, Frisell	2:53
7.	"Red River Valley"	Traditional	3:01
8.	"Reciprocity"	Peacock	4:34
9.	"Good Morning Heartache"	Ervin Drake, Dan Fisher, Irene Higginbotham	5:25
10.	"N.O.M.B."	Peacock	4:53
11.	"Just So Happens"	Peacock, Frisell	7:54
Total length:			51:30
