= Time Line (Ralph Towner album) =

Studio album by Ralph Towner
- Released: March 2006
- Recorded: September 2005
- Studio: Propstei Sankt Gerold; Sankt Gerold, Austria
- Genre: Jazz
- Length: 43:46
- Label: ECM; ECM 1968
- Producer: Manfred Eicher

Ralph Towner chronology
Anthem (2001)	Time Line (2006)	From a Dream (2008)

Time Line is a solo album by American guitarist Ralph Towner recorded at the Propstei Sankt Gerold in September 2005 and released on ECM the following year.

== Reception ==
Professional ratings
Review scores
Source	Rating
Allmusic	4/5 stars
The Penguin Guide to Jazz Recordings	4/4 stars

AllMusic awarded the album 4 star with the review by Thom Jurek, stating, "this is a brief but utterly captivating issue from one of the music's great composers and theorists that should not be missed by anyone interested in Towner, of course, but also in melodic improvisation and composition."

The Penguin Jazz Guide said, "Time Line is a supremely professional record, mostly done in miniatures which couldn't be improved by so much as a note."

== Track listing ==
All compositions by Ralph Towner except where noted

1. "The Pendant" - 4:11
2. "Oleander Etude" - 1:59
3. "Always By Your Side" - 2:52
4. "The Hollows" - 3:23
5. "Anniversary Song" - 1:53
6. "If" - 4:38
7. "Five Glimpses I" - 1:01
8. "Five Glimpses II" - 0:47
9. "Five Glimpses III" - 0:50
10. "Five Glimpses IV" - 0:49
11. "Five Glimpses V" - 0:25
12. "The Lizards of Eraclea" - 2:38
13. "Turning of the Leaves" - 3:45
14. "Come Rain or Come Shine" (Harold Arlen) - 4:14
15. "Freeze Frame" - 4:54
16. "My Man's Gone Now" (George Gershwin, Ira Gershwin) - 5:27

== Personnel ==
- Ralph Towner – classical guitar, 12-string guitar
