= Batik (album) =

Studio album by Ralph Towner
- Released: September 1978
- Recorded: January 1978
- Studio: Talent Studios; Oslo, Norway
- Genre: Jazz
- Length: 44:45
- Label: ECM 1121
- Producer: Manfred Eicher

Ralph Towner chronology
Solstice/Sound and Shadows (1977)	Batik (1978)	Old Friends, New Friends (1979)

Batik is an album by American jazz guitarist Ralph Towner recorded in January 1978 and released on ECM September that same year. The trio features rhythm section Eddie Gómez and Jack DeJohnette.

== Reception ==
The AllMusic review by Scott Yanow stated: "The music unfolds slowly but logically, and Towner's quiet sound displays a lot of inner heat... Well worth listening to closely, at a high volume."

Professional ratings
Review scores
Source	Rating
AllMusic	4/5 stars
The Penguin Guide to Jazz Recordings	3.5/4 stars
The Rolling Stone Jazz Record Guide	4/5 stars

== Track listing ==
All compositions by Ralph Towner

1. "Waterwheel" - 9:20
2. "Shades of Sutton Hoo" - 4:34
3. "Trellis" - 8:18
4. "Batik" - 16:17
5. "Green Room" - 6:16

== Personnel ==
- Ralph Towner – twelve-string guitar, classical guitar, piano
- Eddie Gómez – bass
- Jack DeJohnette – drums
