= Real Life Hits =

Studio album by Gary Burton Quartet
- Released: March 1985
- Recorded: November 1984
- Studio: Tonstudio Bauer; Ludwigsburg, W. Germany
- Genre: Jazz
- Length: 50:15
- Label: ECM; ECM 1293
- Producer: Manfred Eicher

Gary Burton chronology
Lyric Suite for Sextet (1983)	Real Life Hits (1985)	Slide Show (1986)

Real Life Hits is an album by the Gary Burton Quartet, recorded in November 1984 and released on ECM March the following year. The quartet features the rhythm section of Makoto Ozone, Steve Swallow and Michael Hyman.

== Reception ==
Professional ratings
Review scores
Source	Rating
AllMusic	4/5 stars
The Penguin Guide to Jazz Recordings	3/4 stars

The AllMusic review by Scott Yanow stated, "The appealing group sound and the spontaneous yet tight ensembles and solos make this a worthwhile acquisition."

== Track listing ==
1. "Syndrome" (Carla Bley) – 6:19
2. "The Beatles" (John Scofield) – 6:46
3. "Fleurette Africaine" (Duke Ellington) – 7:04
4. "Ladies in Mercedes" (Steve Swallow) – 6:21
5. "Real Life Hits" (Carla Bley) – 8:36
6. "I Need You Here" (Makoto Ozone) – 8:46
7. "Ivanushka Durachok" (Note: Ivanushka Durachok is an archetypal Russian Ivan the Fool) (German Lukyanov) – 6:23

== Personnel ==
- Gary Burton – vibraphone
- Makoto Ozone – piano
- Steve Swallow – bass guitar
- Mike Hyman – drums
