= Paolo Fresu =

Italian jazz musician (born 1961)

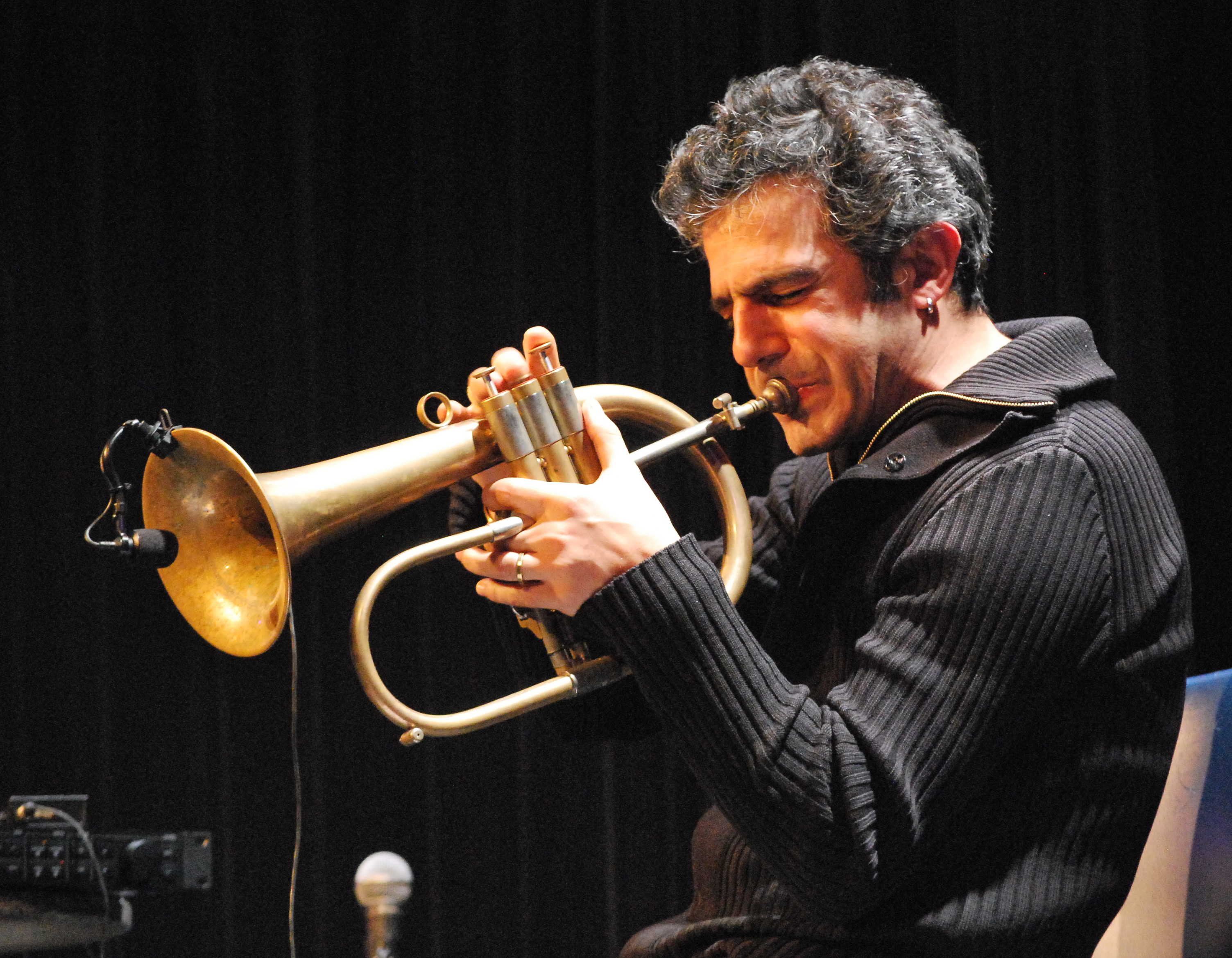
- Fresu in 2010

Background information
- Born: 10 February 1961 (age 65); Berchidda, Sardinia, Italy
- Genre: Jazz
- Occupations: Musician; composer; arranger
- Instruments: Trumpet; flugelhorn
- Labels: EMI; Columbia; Blue Note; RCA; Label Bleu
- Website: paolofresu.it

Paolo Fresu (Sardinian: Pàulu; born 10 February 1961) is an Italian jazz trumpet and flugelhorn player, as well as a composer and arranger of music. His unique trumpet sound is recognized as one of the most distinctive in the contemporary jazz scene.

Fresu plays four distinct instruments: trumpet, flugelhorn, muted trumpet, and electronics. He selectively uses a t.c. electronic effects unit and "one from the past" by DigiTech, through this equipment, he see it as a way to go back in time. Fresu demonstrates his versatile trumpet skills through his rendition of Monteverdi's "Si dolce è il tormento" and Handel's aria "Lascia ch'io Pianga."

== Early life ==
Fresu began studying the trumpet at age 11 in the "Bernardo De Muro" music band of Berchidda. At a young age, Fresu joined "Banda" a local marching band, where a member gave him a cassette of Miles Davis in Europe, with "Autumn Leaves."

Fresu professionally started in 1982, where he recorded with RAI, an Italian public broadcasting corporation, under the direction of Bruno Tommaso.

In the early 80s, Paolo Fresu had attended the Siena Summer Jazz Seminars and impressed Enrico Rava with his performance. It was over the next 10 years did Fresu become a major player in the Italian scene. He started with his quintet, which is currently going, and then began to branched out through a variety of projects.

== Career ==
Born in Berchidda, Sardinia, he picked up the trumpet at the age of 11, and played in the band Bernardo de Muro in his home town Berchidda. Fresu graduated from the Conservatory of Cagliari in 1984, in trumpet studies under Enzo Morandini, and attended the University of Bologna School of music and performing arts in Bologna. He made his debut in 1985, with the release of his first album Ostinato.

He has collaborated with leading Italian musicians like Franesco D'Andrea, Gianluigi Trovesi, Giorgio Gaslini, Enrico Rava, Bruno Tommaso, Giovanni Tommaso, Enrico Pieranunzi, Tiziana Ghiglioni. To European and Americans like Kenny Wheeler, John Taylor, Dave Liebman, Dave Holland, Phil Woods, Riccardo Del Frà, Gerry Mulligan, Bob Brookmayer, John Zorn, John Abercrombie, Helen Merril, Richard Galliano, etc.

One of Paolo Fresu known collaboration is with Omar Sosa, a Cuban born pianist.

He has taught at the Siena Jazz National Seminars, as well as jazz university courses in Terni, and is the director of Nuoro Jazz Seminars in Nuoro, Italy. He has led the Jazz Seminars in Nuoro for 25 years.

Fresu composes music for theatre, poem, dance, radio, television, and film.

In 2007, he recorded and toured with Carla Bley's quartet, the Lost Chords.

In 2011, he released Mistico Mediterraneo, which featured him, Daniele di Bonaventura and five other members playing bandoneons in A Filetta style.

In 2012, his quintet performed at the Sirifort Auditorium, New Delhi, India, to celebrate 10 years of the Italian culture center there.

In 2015, Fresu was awarded an honorary doctorate of music from Berklee College of Music.

Paolo Fresu is the artistic director of the Berchidda Festival Time In Jazz.

=== Tûk Music ===
Paolo Fresu has worked as a producer under his own label, Tǔk Music, where he not only produces his own albums, but artists like Dino Rubino and Marco Bardoscia who he has collaborated with by recording a Chet Baker tribute album Tiempo di Chet (2018). Fresu has also formed a trio with Bardoscia and Rubino, where they play music inspired by poet Lawrence Ferlinghetti. His label Tûk Music was created in 2010 with his colleague Luca Devito, who previously had experience being a production coordinator. With the creation of the label, Fresu and Devito sought to venture off the traditional jazz path and more into the electronic and ethnic sounds, to give incentive to young musicians. While they did create the label to go towards a jazz electronic path, Fresu is not against or preventing the label from working within the tradition jazz path, as they want to be inclusive to everyone.

The labels projects, including Fresu's is based on the digital-related path as Dresu sees it is vital to be present and aware of the new media, ways for building creativity and music. Therefore, Fresu sees digital media as a powerful tool to make music be in the ears of people.

== Awards and Honors ==
- In 1990, won Best Italian Musician awarded by "Musica Jazz"
- In 1990, won Best Group (Paolo Fresu Quintet) awarded by "Musica Jazz"
- In 1990, won Best Record (Live in Montpellier ) awarded by "Musica Jazz"
- In 1996, won "Bobby Jaspar" awarded by "Académie du Jazz"
- In 1996, won Best European Jazz Musician awarded by "Django d'Or"
- Honored with Honors cause degree in Social Psychology at Università Bicocca of Milano, Italy.
- Honored with "Sigillo di Ateneo" by Urbino University
- In April 2024, received the third edition of the Joyce Lussu Prize, established by ANPI Gallura, in a ceremony at the civic library of Olbia.

== Partial discography ==
The complete official discography of Paolo Fresu can be found on his official website (more than 600 tracks).

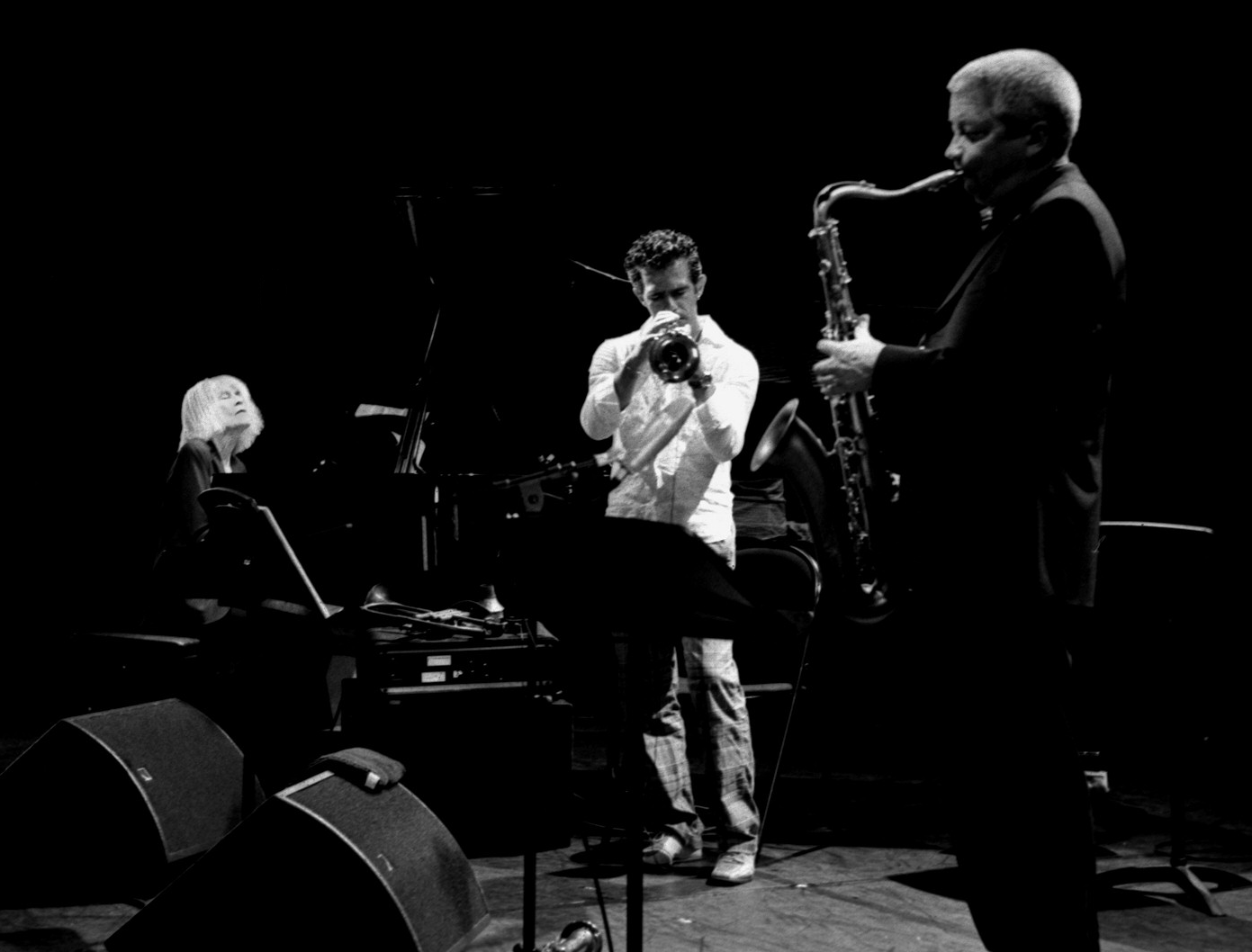
The Lost Chords find Paolo Fresu in Monaco. From left to right: Carla Bley, Paolo Fresu and Andy Sheppard

- 1987 Mamut: Music for a Mime (Splasc(H), 1987)
- 1989 Opale with Francesco Tattara, Furio Di Castri (Clac, 1989)
- 1991 Umiliani Jazz Family with Piero Umiliani (Liuto Edizioni Musicali, 1991)
- 1993 Contos with Furio Di Castri, John Taylor (EGEA, 1993)
- 1995 Palatino with Aldo Romano, Michel Benita, Glenn Ferris (Label Bleu, 1995)
- 1995 Mythscapes with Furio Di Castri, Jon Balke, Pierre Favre (Soul Note, 1995)
- 1996 The Hands with Flavio Piras, Furio Di Castri, Antonello Salis (Amiata, 1996)
- 1997 Wanderlust (RCA Victor, 1997)
- 1998 Palatino Tempo with Aldo Romano, Michel Benita, Glenn Ferris (Label Bleu, 1998)
- 1998 Condaghes with Jacques Pellen, Érik Marchand (Silex)
- 1998 Things Left Behind with Iridescente Ensemble (Symphonia)
- 1999 Metamorfosi (RCA Victor)
- 1999 Shades of Chet with Enrico Rava (Via Veneto Jazz)
- 2001 Porgy and Bess with Orchestra Jazz Della Sardegna (Il Manifesto)
- 2001 Heartland with David Linx, Diederik Wissels (EmArcy)
- 2002 Kind of Porgy & Bess (RCA Victor)
- 2003 Scores (CAM Jazz)
- 2006 Homescape with Nguyen Le, Dhafer Youssef (ACT)
- 2007 Mare Nostrum with Richard Galliano, Jan Lundgren (ACT)
- 2008 Le Fresiadi (Time in Jazz)
- 2009 Jazzitaliano Live 2009 (Casa del Jazz)
- 2010 Chiaroscuro with Ralph Towner (ECM)
- 2011 Alma with Omar Sosa (Tuk)
- 2012 Birth of the Cool (Musica Jazz)
- 2013 Vinodentro (Tuk)
- 2014 Brass Bang! with Steven Bernstein, Gianluca Petrella, Marcus Rojas (Tuk)
- 2015 The Whistleblowers with David Linx, Diederik Wissels (Tuk)
- 2016 Mare Nostrum II with Richard Galliano, Jan Lundgren (ACT)
- 2016 Eros with Omar Sosa, Jaques Morelenbaum, Natacha Atlas (Tuk)
- 2016 Around Tuk (Casa del Jazz)
- 2017 Danse Memoire, Danse (Tuk)
- 2018 Tempo di Chet , with Dino Rubino and Marco Bardoscia (Tuk)
- 2019 Mare Nostrum III with Richard Galliano, Jan Lundgren (ACT)
- 2024 Romance of the Moon , with Yelena Eckemoff (L&H Production)

=== As leader ===
Paolo Fresu 5et

- P.A.R.T.E., (EMI, 2005)
- Incantamento, (EMI, 2006)
- Thinking, (EMI, 2006)
- Kosmopolites, (EMI, 2005)
- Rosso, Verde, Giallo E Blu, (EMI, 2007)

Paolo Fresu Devil Quartet

- Stanley Music, (EMI, 2007)
- Desertico, (Tuk Music, 2013)
- Carpe Diem, (Tuk Music, 2018)

Paolo Fresu

- P60LO FR3SU (Tuk Music, 2021)

=== As sideman ===
With Joe Barbieri

- Origami, (Microcosmo Dischi, 2017)

With Carla Bley

- The Lost Chords find Paolo Fresu (ECM/Watt, 2007)

With Daniele di Bonaventura

- Mistico Mediterraneo, (ECM, 2011)
- In maggiore, (ECM, 2015)

With Uri Caine

- Things (Blue Note, 2006)
- think. (Blue Note, 2009)
- Two Minuettos (Tǔk Music, 2016)

With Lars Danielsson

- Summerwind (ACT, 2018)

With Peter Gabriel

- i/o (Real World, 2023, appears on Live And Let Live)
- o\i (Real World, 2026, appears on the Bright-Side Mix of Put The Bucket Down and on What Lies Ahead)

With Aldo Romano

- Ritual (Owl, 1988)

With Ralph Towner

- Chiaroscuro (ECM, 2008)

== See also ==
- List of jazz arrangers
