= Chiaroscuro (Ralph Towner album) =

Studio album by Ralph Towner
- Released: 2009
- Recorded: October 2008
- Studio: Rainbow Studio; Oslo, Norway
- Genre: Jazz
- Length: 46:35
- Label: ECM; ECM 2085
- Producer: Manfred Eicher

Ralph Towner chronology
From a Dream (2007)	Chiaroscuro (2009)	Travel Guide (2013)

Chiaroscuro is an album by American guitarist Ralph Towner and Italian trumpeter Paolo Fresu recorded in October 2008 and released on ECM the following year.

== Reception ==
The AllMusic review by Jeff Tamarkin awarded the album 4 stars, stating, "Chiaroscuro, naturally, boasts virtuosic musicianship, but it's never about that; it's about two artists coming together by chance and allowing their mutual respect to show them the way to something great."

Professional ratings
Review scores
Source	Rating
Allmusic	4/5 stars

== Track listing ==
All compositions by Ralph Towner except as indicated

No.	Title	Length
1.	"Wistful Thinking"	4:19
2.	"Punta Giara"	6:21
3.	"Chiaroscuro"	6:31
4.	"Sacred Place"	4:13
5.	"Blue in Green" (Miles Davis, Bill Evans)	5:45
6.	"Doubled Up"	4:56
7.	"Zephyr"	7:29
8.	"The Sacred Place (Reprise)"	1:59
9.	"Two Miniatures" (Paulo Fresu, Ralph Towner)	2:38
10.	"Postlude" (Fresu, Towner)	2:31
Total length:		46:42

== Personnel ==
- Ralph Towner – classical guitar, 12 string guitar, baritone guitar
- Paolo Fresu – trumpet, flugelhorn
