= Diary (Ralph Towner album) =

Studio album by Ralph Towner
- Released: 1973
- Recorded: April 4–5, 1973
- Studio: Studio Bauer; Ludwigsburg, W. Germany
- Genre: Jazz
- Length: 42:46
- Label: ECM 1032 ST
- Producer: Manfred Eicher

Ralph Towner chronology
Trios / Solos (1973)	Diary (1973)	Matchbook (1975)

Diary is the debut solo album by American jazz guitarist and composer Ralph Towner, recorded over two days in April 1973 and released on ECM later that year.

== Reception ==
The AllMusic review by David R. Adler awarded the album 3 stars, stating: "It's a solo performance with a twist: Towner plays not only 12-string and classical guitars, but also very competent piano.... Towner accompanies himself via overdubs, playing both guitar and piano for an effect vaguely reminiscent of Bill Evans' Conversations with Myself."

Professional ratings
Review scores
Source	Rating
AllMusic	3/5 stars
The Rolling Stone Jazz Record Guide	4/5 stars
The Penguin Guide to Jazz Recordings	4/4 stars

== Track listing ==
All tracks are written by Ralph Towner, except where noted.

Side I
No.	Title	Length
1.	"Dark Spirit"	7:21
2.	"Entry in a Diary"	3:55
3.	"Images Unseen"	4:14
4.	"Icarus"	6:18

Side II
No.	Title	Writer(s)	Length
1.	"Mon enfant"	Traditional	5:42
2.	"Odgen Road"		8:02
3.	"Erg"		3:21
4.	"Silence of a Candle"		3:53

== Personnel ==
- Ralph Towner – twelve-string guitar, classical guitar, piano, gong
