= Solstice (album) =

Studio album by Ralph Towner
- Released: 1975
- Recorded: December 1974
- Studio: Arne Bendiksen Studio; Oslo, Norway
- Genre: Jazz
- Length: 40:58
- Label: ECM 1060 ST
- Producer: Manfred Eicher

Ralph Towner chronology
Matchbook (1975)	Solstice (1975)	Sargasso Sea (1976)

Solstice chronology
Solstice (1975)	Sound and Shadows (1977)

Professional ratings
Review scores
Source	Rating
AllMusic	4.5/5 stars
The Rolling Stone Jazz Record Guide	3/5 stars
The Penguin Guide to Jazz Recordings	4/4 stars

Solstice is an album by American jazz guitarist Ralph Towner recorded in December 1974 and released on ECM the following year. The Solstice quartet features saxophonist Jan Garbarek and rhythm section Eberhard Weber and Jon Christensen.

== In popular culture ==
The American hip hop group Atmosphere used a sample of Jon Christensen's drum introduction to "Piscean Dance" on a track called "Shoes", which features on their 2003 album Seven's Travels.

== Reception ==
AllMusic awarded the album with 4.5 stars and its review by Michael G. Nastos states: "Of the many excellent recordings he has offered, Solstice is Towner's crowning achievement as a leader fronting this definitive grouping of ECM stablemates who absolutely define the label's sound for the time frame, and for all time".

== Track listing ==
All tracks are written by Ralph Towner except where noted.

Side I
No.	Title	Length
1.	"Oceanus"	11:04
2.	"Visitation"	2:36
3.	"Drifting Petals"	7:01
Total length:		20:41

Side II
No.	Title	Writer(s)	Length
1.	"Nimbus"		6:31
2.	"Winter Solstice"		4:02
3.	"Piscean Dance"		4:15
4.	"Red and Black"		1:19
5.	"Sand"	Eberhard Weber	4:10
Total length:			20:17 40:58

== Personnel ==
=== Solstice ===
- Ralph Towner – 12-string and classical guitar, piano
- Jan Garbarek – tenor and soprano saxophone, flute
- Eberhard Weber – bass, cello
- Jon Christensen – drums, percussion
