= Five Years Later =

Studio album by Ralph Towner & John Abercrombie
- Released: February 1982
- Recorded: March 1981
- Studio: Talent Studios; Oslo, Norway
- Genre: Jazz
- Length: 49:34
- Label: ECM; ECM 1207
- Producer: Manfred Eicher

Ralph Towner chronology
| Solo Concert (1979) | Five Years Later (1982) | Blue Sun (1983) |

John Abercrombie chronology
| M (1981) | Five Years Later (1982) | Solar (1984) |

Five Years Later is a collaborative album by American jazz guitarists Ralph Towner and John Abercrombie, recorded in March 1981 and released on ECM February the following year.

== Reception ==
The AllMusic review by Scott Yanow stated, "One can easily tell the two guitarists apart, since Abercrombie mostly plays electric and has a more forceful sound, while Towner's solos are usually more introverted. They perform three of Towner's songs, a pair of Abercrombie originals, and three collaborations. Although the interaction tends to be fairly quiet, there is a lot of subtle passion."

The Rolling Stone Jazz Record Guide called Five Years Later "another album of spectacular duets".

Professional ratings
Review scores
| Source | Rating |
|---|---|
| AllMusic | 2.5/5 stars |
| The Rolling Stone Jazz Record Guide | 4/5 stars |

== Track listing ==
| No. | Title | Writer(s) | Length |
|---|---|---|---|
| 1. | "Late Night Passenger" | Abercrombie; Towner | 9:54 |
| 2. | "Isla" | Abercrombie | 6:24 |
| 3. | "Half Past Two" | Towner | 4:26 |
| 4. | "Microtheme" | Abercrombie; Towner | 3:39 |
| 5. | "Caminata" | Towner | 3:01 |
| 6. | "The Juggler's Etude" | Towner | 7:29 |
| 7. | "Bumabia" | Abercrombie; Towner | 9:50 |
| 8. | "Child's Play" | Abercrombie | 4:51 |

== Personnel ==
- John Abercrombie – electric guitar, acoustic guitar, twelve-string guitar, mandolin
- Ralph Towner – twelve-string guitar, classical guitar
