= Lost and Found (Ralph Towner album) =

Studio album by Ralph Towner
- Released: January 1996
- Recorded: May 1995
- Studio: Rainbow Studios; Oslo, Norway
- Genre: Jazz
- Length: 57:45
- Label: ECM; ECM 1563
- Producer: Manfred Eicher

Ralph Towner chronology
Oracle (1994)	Lost and Found (1996)	Ana (1997)

Lost and Found is an album by guitarist Ralph Towner recorded in May 1995 and released on ECM the following year. The quartet features reed player Denney Goodhew and rhythm section Marc Johnson and Jon Christensen.

== Reception ==
The AllMusic review by Thom Jurek awarded the album 4 stars, stating, "This is a guitar player's recording, but it is obvious that Towner writes for ensembles equally well, and he has clearly written the vast majority of this recording for this particular ensemble. It's seamless from start to finish; it moves and is far less ponderous than some of his earlier outings; it's a winner for sure."

Professional ratings
Review scores
Source	Rating
AllMusic	4/5 stars
The Penguin Guide to Jazz Recordings	3.5/4 stars

== Track listing ==
All compositions by Ralph Towner except as indicated

1. "Harbinger" - 2:34
2. "Trill Ride" (Marc Johnson, Ralph Towner) - 3:01
3. "Élan Vital" - 6:20
4. "Summer's End" - 5:15
5. "Col legno" (Johnson) - 3:16
6. "Soft Landing" (Denney Goodhew, Johnson, Towner) - 2:17
7. "Flying Cows" (Goodhew) - 4:57
8. "Mon enfant" (Anonymous) - 4:06
9. "A Breath Away" - 5:17
10. "Scrimshaw" - 1:26
11. "Midnight Blue... Red Shift" (Goodhew) - 3:27
12. "Moonless" (Johnson, Towner) - 4:39
13. "Sco Cone" (Johnson) - 3:44
14. "Tattler" - 3:08
15. "Taxi's Waiting" - 4:34

== Personnel ==
- Ralph Towner – twelve-string guitar, classical guitar
- Denney Goodhew – sopranino, soprano, and baritone saxophones, bass clarinet
- Marc Johnson – bass
- Jon Christensen – drums
