= Sargasso Sea (John Abercrombie and Ralph Towner album) =

Studio album by John Abercrombie & Ralph Towner
- Released: 1976
- Recorded: May 1976
- Studio: Talent; Oslo, Norway
- Genre: Jazz
- Length: 41:08
- Label: ECM 1080 ST
- Producer: Manfred Eicher

John Abercrombie chronology
Gateway (1976)	Sargasso Sea (1976)	Characters (1978)

Ralph Towner chronology
Solstice (1975)	Sargasso Sea (1976)	Sound and Shadows (1977)

Sargasso Sea is an album by American jazz guitarists John Abercrombie and Ralph Towner, recorded in May 1976 and released on ECM Records later that year.

== Reception ==
Professional ratings
Review scores
Source	Rating
AllMusic	3/5 stars
Penguin Guide to Jazz	3/4 stars
The Rolling Stone Jazz Record Guide	4/5 stars

The AllMusic review by Michael G. Nastos stated, "An uneven recording for many listeners and critics, Sargasso Sea deserves a second chance, not as an absolutely flawed, imperfect, or unbalanced effort. Like a tale of two cities, it stands as a unique project, perhaps deserving a more refined approach."

The Penguin Guide to Jazz called it "a winsome, diffident affair on which only the timbral variation of Towner's 12-string and piano figures sustains interest... it's less than representative of Abercrombie's real strengths."

The Rolling Stone Jazz Record Guide said, "The alternately pensive and vibrant electric/acoustic interplay between these two master guitarists makes this a classic album of guitar duets."

== Track listing ==
All tracks are written by John Abercrombie except where noted.

Side I
No.	Title	Writer(s)	Length
1.	"Fable"		8:41
2.	"Avenue"		5:19
3.	"Sargasso Sea"	John Abercrombie; Ralph Towner	4:01
4.	"Over and Gone"		2:51

Side II
No.	Title	Writer(s)	Length
1.	"Elbow Room"	Abercrombie; Towner	5:11
2.	"Staircase"	Towner	6:24
3.	"Romantic Descension"		3:17
4.	"Parasol"	Towner	5:24

== Personnel ==
- John Abercrombie – electric guitar, acoustic guitar
- Ralph Towner – twelve-string guitar, classical guitar, piano
