= In maggiore =

Studio album by Paolo Fresu with Daniele di Bonaventura
- Released: March 20, 2015
- Recorded: May 2014
- Studio: Auditorio Stelio Molo RSI; Lugano, Switzerland
- Genre: Jazz; world music
- Length: 47:20
- Label: ECM 2412
- Producer: Manfred Eicher

Paolo Fresu albums chronology
The Whistleblowers (2015)	In maggiore (2015)	Mare Nostrum II (2016)

Daniele di Bonaventura chronology
Jazzy Christmas (2014)	In maggiore (2015)	Yo Yo (2016)

Professional ratings
Review scores
Source	Rating
All About Jazz	4.5/5 stars

In maggiore (Italian: "In Major") is an album by Sardinian jazz trumpeter Paolo Fresu with the Italian bandoneonist Daniele di Bonaventura recorded in May 2014 and released on ECM March the following year.

== Composition ==
This album is the second collaboration between Paolo Fresu and Daniele di Bonaventura, in January 2011, they released "Mistico Mediterraneo" on the ECM label (ECM 2220). On this album, they played music from all around the world, like a Bretton lullaby, a Latin American theme and a Chilean resistance song. The making of this album is told on the Fabrizio Ferraro's movie "Wenn aus dem Himmel..."

== Track listing ==
ECM – ECM 2412.

No.	Title	Writer(s)	Length
1.	"Da Capo Cadenza"	Daniele di Bonaventura	3:01
2.	"Ton Kozh"	Paolo Fresu	5:36
3.	"O Que Sera/El Pueblo Unido Jamàs Serà Vencido"	Chico Buarque & Sergio Ortega	6:10
4.	"Non ti scordar di me"	Ernesto de Curtis	3:54
5.	"Sketches"	Paolo Fresu & Daniele di Bonaventura	2:39
6.	"Apnea"	Paolo Fresu	3:07
7.	"Te Recuerdo Amanda"	Victor Jara	3:29
8.	"La Mia Terra"	Daniele di Bonaventura	2:27
9.	"Kyrie Eleison"	Daniele di Bonaventura	3:22
10.	"Quando me'n vò"	Giacomo Puccini	4:11
11.	"Se va la Muerga"	Jaime Roos	5:05
12.	"Calmo"	Paolo Fresu	1:57
13.	"In Maggiore"	Paolo Fresu	2:22
Total length:			47:20

== Personnel ==
- Daniele di Bonaventura – bandoneon
- Paolo Fresu – trumpet, flugelhorn
