= Sound and Shadows =

Studio album by Ralph Towner / Solstice
- Released: 1977
- Recorded: February 1977
- Studio: Talent Studio; Oslo, Norway
- Genre: Jazz
- Length: 44:35
- Label: ECM; ECM 1095 ST
- Producer: Manfred Eicher

Ralph Towner chronology
Sargasso Sea (1976)	Sound and Shadows (1977)	Batik (1978)

Solstice chronology
Solstice (1975)	Sounds and Shadows (1977)

Professional ratings
Review scores
Source	Rating
AllMusic	4/5 stars
The Penguin Guide to Jazz Recordings	3/4 stars

Sound and Shadows is an album by American jazz guitarist Ralph Towner, recorded in February 1977 and released on ECM later that year, Towner's second album with his Solstice quartet, featuring saxophonist Jan Garbarek and rhythm section Eberhard Weber and Jon Christensen.

== Reception ==
The AllMusic review by Michael G. Nastos states, "The playing here by Towner and a group of other ECM artists is what made the label so noteworthy: it is full of elegance and aplomb and the musicians are as aware of space as they are of what fills it."

== Track listing ==
All tracks are written by Ralph Towner.

Side I
No.	Title	Length
1.	"Distant Hills"	10:46
2.	"Balance Beam"	10:44
Total length:		21:30

Side II
No.	Title	Length
1.	"Along the Way"	5:14
2.	"Arion"	8:44
3.	"Song of the Shadows"	9:24
Total length:		44:52

== Personnel ==
=== Solstice ===
- Ralph Towner – 12-string and classical guitar, piano, French horn
- Jan Garbarek – tenor and soprano saxophone, flute
- Eberhard Weber – bass, cello
- Jon Christensen – drums, percussion

=== Technical personnel ===
- Manfred Eicher – producer
- Jan Erik Kongshaug – recording engineer
- Barbara Wojirsch – cover design
- Roberto Masotti – photography
