= Travel Guide =

Studio album by Ralph Towner, Wolfgang Muthspiel, and Slava Grigoryan
- Released: September 20, 2013
- Recorded: August 2012
- Studios: Auditorio Stelio Molo RSI; Lugano, Switzerland
- Genre: Jazz
- Length: 50:30
- Label: ECM 2310
- Producer: Manfred Eicher

Ralph Towner chronology
Chiaroscuro (2009)	Travel Guide (2013)	My Foolish Heart (2017)

Travel Guide is an album by guitarists Ralph Towner, Wolfgang Muthspiel, and Slava Grigoryan recorded in Switzerland in August 2012 and released on ECM September the following year.

The trio first performed as a group in 2005, and previously appeared together on the album From a Dream.

== Reception ==
Professional ratings
Review scores
Source	Rating
AllMusic	4/5 stars
All About Jazz	4.5/5 stars
The Guardian	3/5 stars

In a review for AllMusic, Thom Jurek wrote: "These compositions weren't written for these players to showcase their solo chops, but rather as songs with limited but impeccable improvisation... Travel Guide is an understated, uncluttered gem of virtuosity and composition. The unselfish sense of deference between these players reveals not only their comfort with one another, but the collective confidence of a uniquely voiced, developing group."

John Kelman of All About Jazz stated: "as genre lines continue to blur and, in some cases, dissolve entirely, recordings like the rigorous yet open-minded Travel Guide demonstrate there are plenty of meeting points for those unconstrained by false definitions of style or approach."

The Guardian's John Fordham called the album "a guitar fan's delight, but also a warmly inviting collection of song-shaped pieces," and commented: "The sonics of all-guitar bands can turn to a blur, but these three phrase in their own ways... though the songs are mostly patiently thoughtful, their differences emerge the deeper in you get."

Writing for Jazz Times, Thomas Conrad remarked: "The classical mindset is apparent in the formality, orderliness and technical sophistication of this music. But the elegant structural frameworks support individual and collective improvisation... The diversity of alluring sonorities is extraordinary. It is hard to think of a recent jazz recording prettier than Travel Guide."

In an article for Something Else!, S. Victor Aaron wrote: "Mellow is what you get from an ECM disc involving Ralph Towner, and Travel Guide is no exception. You get the fine craftsmanship, pristine production and a solid batch of songs, too. Thus, this is how mellow with a trio of guitarists is done right."

George W. Harris of Jazz Weekly stated: "What brings it all together is a tremendous amount of lyricism, sensitive listening, inherent melody and kindred souls to create one of the most sublime sessions in recent memory... Delicate without being fragile, this is music for a lifetime of listening pleasures."

== Track listing ==
No.	Title	Length
1.	"The Henrysons" (Wolfgang Muthspiel)	7:04
2.	"Father Time" (Ralph Towner)	4:37
3.	"Windsong" (Wolfgang Muthspiel)	6:43
4.	"Duende" (Ralph Towner)	4:29
5.	"Amarone Trio" (Wolfgang Muthspiel)	5:42
6.	"Travel Guide" (Ralph Towner)	6:34
7.	"Die Blaue Stunde" (Wolfgang Muthspiel)	5:19
8.	"Nico Und Mithra" (Wolfgang Muthspiel)	3:44
9.	"Tarry" (Ralph Towner)	1:03
10.	"Museum of Light" (Ralph Towner)	5:17

== Personnel ==
- Ralph Towner – classical and 12-string guitars
- Wolfgang Muthspiel – electric guitar, voice
- Slava Grigoryan – classical and baritone guitars
