= Joe Barbieri =

Italian singer-songwriter (born 1973)

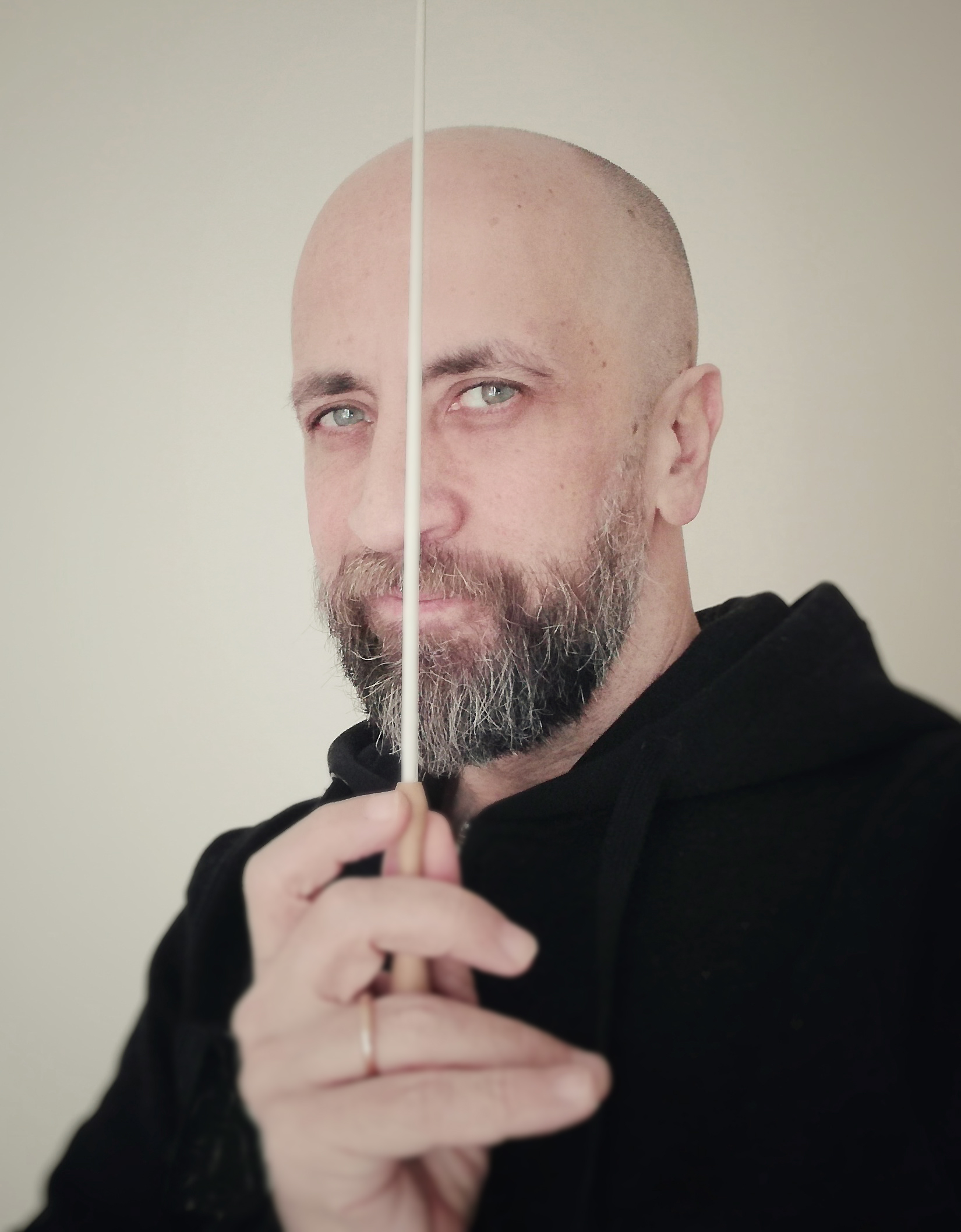
- Joe Barbieri in 2020

Background information
- Born: December 14, 1973 (age 52); Naples, Italy
- Genres: World music, jazz, pop
- Occupations: Singer, songwriter, musician
- Instrument: Guitar
- Labels: Microcosmo Dischi, Harmonia Mundi, Yamaha
- Website: www.joebarbieri.com

Joe Barbieri (born December 14, 1973) is a singer, songwriter, and producer.

== Music career ==
Born in Naples, Barbieri started his career in 1993 under the production by Pino Daniele. He was a member of the vocal group Neri per Caso between 2000 and 2002. He has worked as a songwriter for other artists. Although he started out a pop singer, he moved to a more sophisticated style. His music combines world music, jazz, and the tradition of the Italian cantautori. Along his career he dedicated two albums to Chet Baker (Chet Lives!) and Billie Holiday (Dear Billie).

== Discography ==
=== Studio albums ===
- Gli amori della vita mia (1993)
- Virus (1998)
- Fuori Catalogo (2003)
- In Parole Povere (2004)
- Maison Maravilha (2009)
- Maison Maravilha Viva (live) (2010) CD+DVD
- Respiro (2012)
- Chet Lives! (2013)
- Cosmonauta Da Appartamento (2015)
- Origami (2017)
- Dear Billie (2019)
- Tratto Da Una Storia Vera (2021)

=== Live albums ===
- Maison Maravilha Viva (2010)
- Tratto da una notte vera (2022)

=== Notable collaborations ===
- "Niente Di Grave" (with Jaques Morelenbaum)
- "Rinascimento" (with Paolo Fresu)
- "Un Arrivederci In Cima Al Mondo" (with Luz Casal)
- "Cosmonauta Da Appartamento" (with Hamilton De Holanda)
- "I Fall In Love Too Easily" (with Stacey Kent)
- "But Not For Me" (with Márcio Faraco)
- "Spina Dorsale" (with Musica Nuda)
- "Diario Di Una Caduta" (with Jorge Drexler)
- "Le Milonghe Del Sabato" (with Gianmaria Testa)
- "Un Regno Da Disfare" (with Stefano Bollani)
- "'E Vase Annure" and "Étape Par Étape Par Étape" (with Fabrizio Bosso)
- "Lacrime Di Coccodrillo" (with Chiara Civello)
- "Malegría" (with Omara Portuondo)
