= Oracle (Gary Peacock and Ralph Towner album) =

Studio album by Gary Peacock & Ralph Towner
- Released: January 1994
- Recorded: May 1993
- Studio: Rainbow Studios; Oslo, Norway
- Genre: Chamber jazz
- Length: 49:51
- Label: ECM; ECM 1490
- Producer: Manfred Eicher

Gary Peacock chronology
Partners (1991)	Oracle (1994)	Just So Happens (1994)

Ralph Towner chronology
Open Letter (1992)	Oracle (1994)	Lost and Found (1996)

Oracle is an album by American jazz bassist Gary Peacock and guitarist Ralph Towner, recorded in May 1993 and released on ECM January the following year.

== Reception ==
The AllMusic review by Scott Yanow stated: "There is a surprising amount of ferocious interplay between the two musicians. They may play at a consistently low volume, but the set of originals has a few rather passionate grooves and a little more energy than one would have predicted."

Professional ratings
Review scores
Source	Rating
AllMusic	4.5/5 stars
The Penguin Guide to Jazz Recordings	3/4 stars
Tom Hull – on the Web	B+

== Track listing ==
All compositions by Gary Peacock except as indicated

1. "Gaya" - 5:45
2. "Flutter Step" - 5:45
3. "Empty Carrousel" 5:48
4. "Hat and Cane" (Ralph Towner) - 5:12
5. "Inside Inside" - 5:55
6. "St. Helens" - 1:52
7. "Oracle" (Peacock, Towner) - 7:20
8. "Burly Hello" - 5:53
9. "Tramonto" (Towner) - 6:21

== Personnel ==
- Gary Peacock – bass
- Ralph Towner – classical guitar, 12 string guitar
