= Solo Concert (Ralph Towner album) =

Live album by Ralph Towner
- Released: 1980
- Recorded: October 1979
- Venue: Amerika Haus, München, Germany; Limmathaus, Zürich, Switzerland
- Genre: Jazz
- Length: 47:29
- Label: ECM 1173
- Producer: Manfred Eicher

Ralph Towner chronology
| Old Friends, New Friends (1979) | Solo Concert (1980) | Five Years Later (1982) |

Solo Concert is a live solo album by American guitarist Ralph Towner recorded at the Amerika Haus in München, Germany and Limmathaus in Zürich, Switzerland in October 1979 and released on ECM the following year.

== Reception ==
The AllMusic review by Scott Yanow awarded the album 4 stars, stating, "The interpretations are typically sensitive, thoughtful, and often introspective, but also show off Towner's impressive technique."

Professional ratings
Review scores
| Source | Rating |
|---|---|
| AllMusic | 4/5 stars |
| The Rolling Stone Jazz Record Guide | 4/5 stars |
| The Penguin Guide to Jazz Recordings | 3.5/4 stars |
| DownBeat | 5/5 stars |

== Track listing ==
All compositions by Ralph Towner except as indicated

1. "Spirit Lake" - 8:43
2. "Ralph's Piano Waltz" (John Abercrombie) - 7:04
3. "Train of Thought" - 5:30
4. "'Zoetrope" - 6:00
5. "Nardis" (Miles Davis) - 5:12
6. "Chelsea Courtyard" - 6:53
7. "Timeless" (Abercrombie) - 4:54

== Personnel ==
- Ralph Towner – twelve-string guitar, classical guitar
