= City of Eyes =

Studio album by Ralph Towner
- Released: April 1989
- Recorded: January and November 1988
- Studio: Rainbow Studio, Oslo, and Power Station, New York
- Genre: Chamber jazz
- Length: 46:53
- Label: ECM; ECM 1388
- Producer: Manfred Eicher

Ralph Towner chronology
Slide Show (1986)	City of Eyes (1989)	Open Letter (1992)

City of Eyes is an album by American jazz guitarist Ralph Towner recorded in 1988 and released on ECM April the following year. The quintet features trumpeter, Markus Stockhausen, oboist Paul McCandless, and rhythm section Gary Peacock and Jerry Granelli.

== Reception ==
The AllMusic review by Thom Jurek awarded the album 4 stars, stating, "City of Eyes shows Ralph Towner as a musical explorer again, a composer and instrumentalist who can persuasively create aural travelogues through time, space, and terrain."

Professional ratings
Review scores
Source	Rating
AllMusic	4/5 stars
The Penguin Guide to Jazz Recordings	3/4 stars

== Track listing ==
All compositions by Ralph Towner

1. "Jamaica Stopover" - 4:11
2. "Cascades' - 6:47
3. "Les Douzilles" - 6:10
4. "City of Eyes" - 4:11
5. "Sipping the Past" 2:31
6. "Far Cry" - 4:23
7. "Janet" - 3:21
8. "Sustained Release" - 5:03
9. "Tundra" - 4:40
10. "Blue Gown" - 5:36

== Personnel ==
- Ralph Towner – twelve-string guitar, classical guitar, piano, synthesizer
- Markus Stockhausen – trumpet, piccolo trumpet, fluegelhorn
- Paul McCandless – oboe, English horn
- Gary Peacock – bass
- Jerry Granelli – drums, electronic drums
