= A Closer View =

Studio album by Gary Peacock & Ralph Towner
- Released: January 1998
- Recorded: December 1995
- Studio: Rainbow Studio; Oslo, Norway
- Genre: Chamber jazz
- Length: 56:34
- Label: ECM; ECM 1602
- Producer: Manfred Eicher

Gary Peacock chronology
Just So Happens (1994)	A Closer View (1998)	Now This (2015)

Ralph Towner chronology
Ana (1997)	A Closer View (1998)	Verso (2000)

A Closer View is an album by American jazz guitarist Ralph Towner and bassist Gary Peacock recorded in December 1995 in Norway and released on ECM in 1998.

== Reception ==
The AllMusic review by Leo Stanley awarded the album 3 stars, stating, "A Closer View finds Ralph Towner working with Gary Peacock, crafting a subtle, textured instrumental album that relies more on compositions than improvisations. Occasionally, it all gets a little too static and colorless, but the best moments are fluid, engaging and graceful."

Doug Ramsey of Jazz Times wrote "The news release accompanying the advance CD says that three of the pieces in A Closer View are “off-the-cuff joint compositions.” One can only guess which three. The most attentive and knowledgeable listener will be unable to tell where composition ends and improvisation begins in this music performed by guitarist Towner and bassist Peacock. The most discerning will not consider it an issue. It is more important that, despite its quietness, the richly textured music flows with uncommon harmonic interest and rhythmic strength. No one familiar with Peacock's and Towner's many past collaborations will be surprised at their synergy, which may involve ESP. Each is a virtuoso who makes virtuosity servant to the music. Deep intelligence, hard work and complexity went into the conception and performance of the pieces on this album. The listener hears ease and simplicity. As Red Mitchell famously observed, simple isn't easy. Hearing Peacock and Towner, you'd never know it."

Professional ratings
Review scores
Source	Rating
AllMusic	3/5 stars
The Penguin Guide to Jazz Recordings	4/4 stars

== Track listing ==
All compositions by Ralph Towner, except as noted.

1. "Opalesque" (Peacock, Towner) - 3:29
2. "Viewpoint" - 1:19
3. "Mingusiana" - 4:03
4. "Creeper" - 6:10
5. "Infrared" - 3:55
6. "From Branch to Branch" (Peacock, Towner) - 5:13
7. "Postcard to Salta" (Peacock, Towner) - 3:12
8. "Toledo" - 6:18
9. "Amber Captive" (Peacock, Towner) - 4:15
10. "Moor" (Peacock) - 4:59
11. "Beppo" - 6:24
12. "A Closer View" - 4:48

== Personnel ==
- Ralph Towner – classical guitar, 12 string guitar
- Gary Peacock – double bass
