= Blue Sun (album) =

Studio album by Ralph Towner
- Released: 1983
- Recorded: December 1982
- Studio: Talent, Oslo, Norway
- Genre: Jazz
- Length: 44:47
- Label: ECM 1250
- Producer: Manfred Eicher

Ralph Towner chronology
Five Years Later (1982)	Blue Sun (1983)	Slide Show (1984)

Blue Sun is a solo album by guitarist Ralph Towner, recorded in December 1982 and released by ECM Records the following year.

== Critical reception ==
Professional ratings
Review scores
Source	Rating
AllMusic	3/5 stars
The Penguin Guide to Jazz Recordings	2.5/4 stars
The Rolling Stone Jazz Record Guide	3/5 stars

The Globe and Mail wrote that "the synthesizer ... opens up the limited dynamic range of his music, and brings him out of himself to the point where his tune 'C. T. Kangaroo' can sound something like Keith Jarrett sitting in with Weather Report." The Philadelphia Inquirer deemed the album "stark Nordic snooze music."

== Track listing ==
All compositions by Ralph Towner

1. "Blue Sun" - 7:21
2. "The Prince and the Sage" - 6:23
3. "C.T. Kangaroo" - 5:38
4. "Mevlana Etude" - 3:09
5. "Wedding of the Streams" - 5:10
6. "Shadow Fountain" - 6:39
7. "Rumours of Rain" - 11:02

== Personnel ==
- Ralph Towner – twelve-string guitar, classical guitar, piano, Prophet 5 synthesizer, French Horn, cornet, percussion
