= Ana (Ralph Towner album) =

Studio album by Ralph Towner
- Released: April 1997
- Recorded: March 1996
- Studio: Rainbow Studio; Oslo, Norway
- Genre: Jazz
- Length: 48:08
- Label: ECM; ECM 1611
- Producer: Manfred Eicher

Ralph Towner chronology
Lost and Found (1996)	Ana (1997)	A Closer View (1998)

Ana is a solo album by American jazz guitarist Ralph Towner, recorded in March 1996 and released on ECM April the following year.

== Reception ==
The AllMusic review by Stephen Thomas Erlewine states, "While Towner isn't entirely successful in melding classical, jazz and new age—he frequently meanders—several sections of Ana are as lovely and hypnotic as anything else in his catalog."

Professional ratings
Review scores
Source	Rating
AllMusic	2.5/5 stars
The Penguin Guide to Jazz Recordings	3.5/4 stars

== Track listing ==
All compositions by Ralph Towner

1. "The Reluctant Bride" – 4:28
2. "Tale of Saverio" – 5:13
3. "Joyful Departure" – 3:58
4. "Green and Golden" – 5:06
5. "I Knew It Was You" – 4:02
6. "Les Douzilles" – 6:49
7. "Veldt" – 2:21
8. "Between the Clouds" – 1:07
9. "Child on the Porch" – 1:35
10. "Carib Crib (1)" – 1:55
11. "Slavic Mood" – 1:43
12. "Carib Crib (2)" – 1:53
13. "Toru" – 3:24
14. "Sage Brush Rider" – 4:04

== Personnel ==
- Ralph Towner – classical guitar, 12 string guitar
