= Ralph Towner =

American musician, composer and arranger (1940–2026)

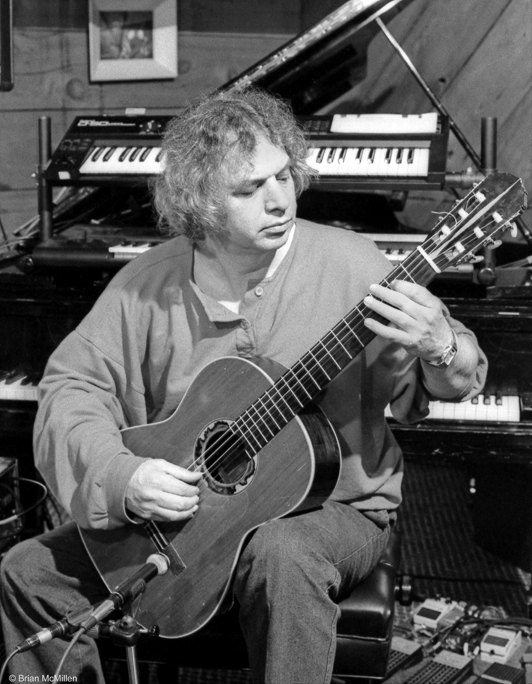
- Towner performing with Oregon in 1989

Background information
- Born: March 1, 1940; Chehalis, Washington, U.S.
- Died: January 18, 2026 (aged 85) Rome, Italy
- Genres: Jazz rock; folk rock
- Occupations: Guitarist; arranger; bandleader; composer
- Instruments: Guitar; piano; synthesizers; percussion; trumpet; French horn
- Years active: 1960–2026
- Label: ECM
- Website: www.ralphtowner.com

Ralph Towner (March 1, 1940 – January 18, 2026) was an American multi-instrumentalist, composer, arranger, and bandleader. He played the twelve-string guitar, classical guitar, electric FRAME guitar, piano, synthesizer, percussion, trumpet, and French horn.

== Life and career ==
Towner was born into a musical family in Chehalis, Washington, United States, on March 1, 1940. His mother was a piano teacher and his father a trumpet player. Towner learned to improvise on the piano at the age of three. He began his career as a conservatory-trained classical pianist, attending the University of Oregon from 1958 to 1963, where he also studied composition with Homer Keller. He studied classical guitar at the Vienna Academy of Music with Karl Scheit from 1963 to 1964 and 1967–68.

He joined world music pioneer Paul Winter's "Consort" ensemble in the late 1960s. He first played jazz in New York City in the late 1960s as a pianist and was strongly influenced by the renowned jazz pianist Bill Evans. He began improvising on classical and 12-string guitars in the late 1960s and early 1970s and formed alliances with musicians who had worked with Evans, including flautist Jeremy Steig; bassists Eddie Gómez, Marc Johnson and Gary Peacock; and drummer Jack DeJohnette.

Along with bandmates Paul McCandless, Glen Moore, and Collin Walcott, Towner left the Winter Consort in 1970 to form the group Oregon, which over the course of the 1970s issued a number of influential records mixing folk music, Indian classical forms, and avant-garde jazz-influenced free improvisation. At the same time, Towner began a longstanding relationship with the ECM record label, which released virtually all of his non-Oregon recordings beginning with his 1973 album Trios / Solos.

Towner appeared as a sideman on Weather Report's 1972 album I Sing the Body Electric. His 1975 album Solstice, which featured a popular track called "Nimbus", demonstrated his skill and versatility to the fullest using a 12-string guitar.

From the early 1990s, Towner lived in Italy, first in Palermo and then in Rome. He died in Rome on January 18, 2026, at the age of 85.

== Technique ==
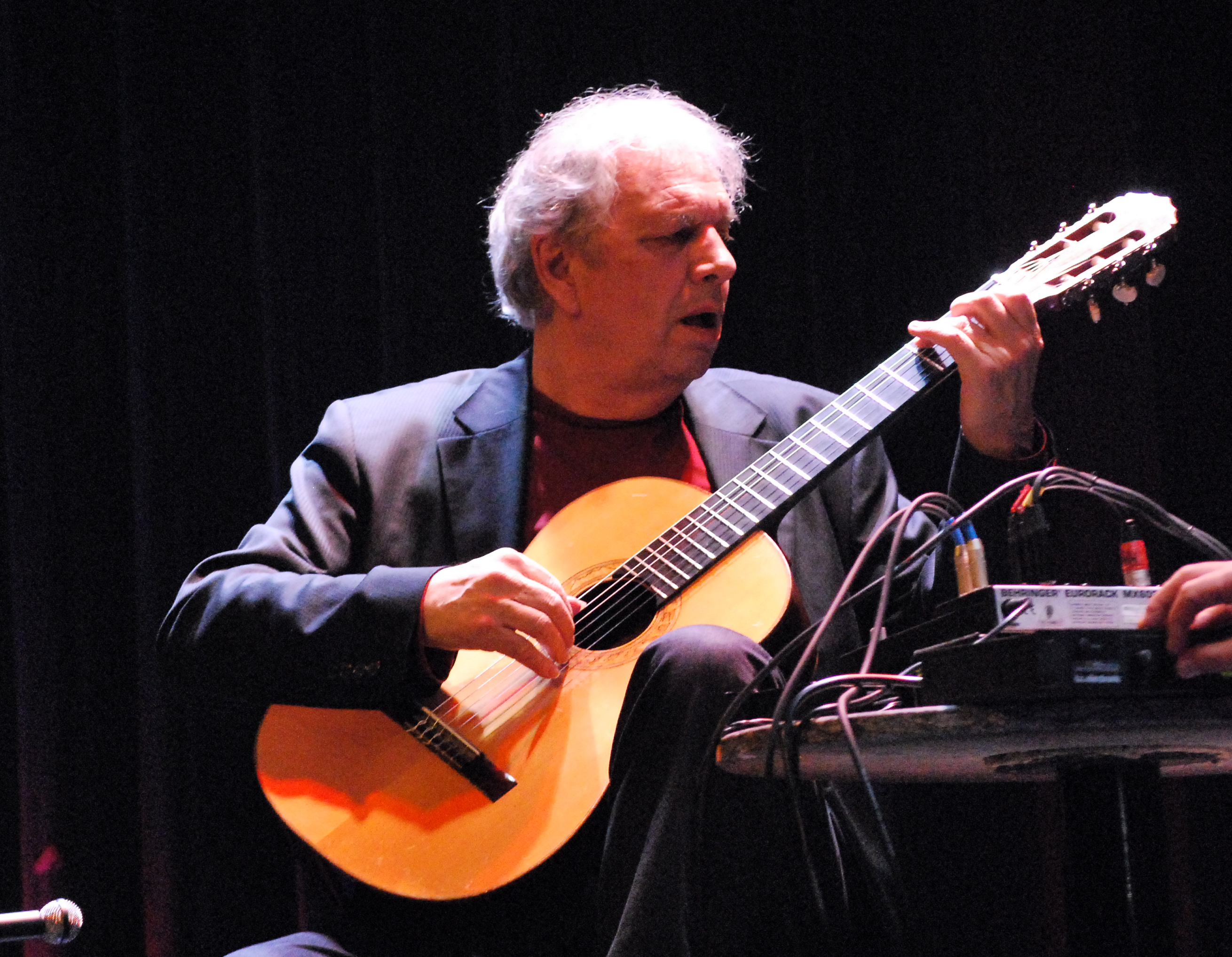
Towner performing in Innsbruck, Austria, 2010

Towner played acoustic guitars, using six-string nylon-string and 12-string steel-string guitars, as well as the six-string electric FRAME guitar. He tended to avoid high-volume musical environments, preferring small groups of mostly acoustic instruments that emphasize dynamics and group interplay. Towner obtained a percussive effect (e.g., "Donkey Jamboree" from Slide Show with Gary Burton) from the guitar by weaving a matchbook among the strings at the neck of the instrument. Both with Oregon and as a solo artist, Towner made use of overdubbing, allowing him to play piano (or synthesizer) and guitar on the same track; his most notable use of the technique came on his 1974 album Diary, in which he plays guitar-piano duets with himself on most of the album's eight tracks. In the 1980s, Towner began using the Sequential Circuits Prophet-5 synthesizer extensively, but has since de-emphasized his synthesizer and piano playing in favor of guitar.

== Honors ==
Two lunar craters were named by the Apollo 15 astronauts after two of Towner's compositions, "Icarus" and "Ghost Beads".

== Discography ==
=== As leader ===
- Trios / Solos with Glen Moore (ECM, 1973)
- Diary (ECM, 1974)
- Solstice (ECM, 1975)
- Matchbook with Gary Burton (ECM, 1975)
- Sargasso Sea with John Abercrombie (ECM, 1976)
- Solstice/Sound and Shadows (ECM, 1977)
- Batik (ECM, 1978)
- Old Friends, New Friends (ECM, 1979)
- Solo Concert (ECM, 1980)
- Five Years Later with John Abercrombie (ECM, 1982)
- Blue Sun (ECM, 1983)
- Slide Show with Gary Burton (ECM, 1986)
- City of Eyes (ECM, 1989)
- Open Letter (ECM, 1992)
- If You Look Far Enough with Arild Andersen, Nana Vasconcelos (ECM, 1993)
- Oracle with Gary Peacock (ECM, 1994)
- Lost and Found (ECM, 1996)
- Ana (ECM, 1997)
- A Closer View with Gary Peacock (ECM, 1998)
- Verso with Maria Pia De Vito (Provocateur, 2000)
- Anthem (ECM, 2001)
- Time Line (ECM, 2006)
- From a Dream with Wolfgang Muthspiel and Slava Grigoryan (Material, 2008)
- Chiaroscuro with Paolo Fresu (ECM, 2009)
- Travel Guide with Wolfgang Muthspiel, Slava Grigoryan (ECM, 2013)
- My Foolish Heart (ECM, 2017)
- At First Light (ECM, 2023)

=== As a member ===
Atmosphere

- Atmospheres Featuring Clive Stevens & Friends (Capitol, 1974)
- Voyage to Uranus (Capitol, 1974)

Oregon

- Music of Another Present Era (Vanguard, 1972)
- Distant Hills (Vanguard, 1973)
- Winter Light (Vanguard, 1974)
- In Concert (Vanguard, 1975)
- Together (Vanguard, 1976)
- Friends (Vanguard, 1977)
- Out of the Woods (Elektra, 1978)
- Violin (Vanguard, 1978)
- Roots in the Sky (Elektra, 1979)
- Moon and Mind (Vanguard, 1979)
- In Performance (BGO, 1980)
- Our First Record (Vanguard, 1980)
- Oregon (ECM, 1983)
- Crossing (ECM, 1985)
- Ecotopia (ECM, 1987)
- 45th Parallel (Portrait, 1989)
- Always, Never, and Forever (veraBra, 1991)
- Troika (veraBra, 1994)
- Beyond Words (Chesky, 1995)
- Northwest Passage (ECM, 1997)
- Music for a Midsummer Night's Dream (Oregon Music, 1998)
- Oregon in Moscow (ECM, 2000)
- Live at Yoshi's (ECM, 2002)
- Prime (C.A.M. Jazz, 2005)
- 1000 Kilometers (C.A.M. Jazz, 2007)
- In Stride (C.A.M. Jazz, 2010)
- Family Tree (C.A.M. Jazz, 2012)
- Live in New Orleans (Hi Hat, 2016)
- Lantern (C.A.M. Jazz, 2017)

Paul Winter Consort

- Road (A&M, 1970)
- Icarus (Epic, 1972)
- Earthdance (A&M, 1977)

=== As sideman or guest ===
With Horacee Arnold

- Tribe (Columbia, 1973)
- Tales of the Exonerated Flea (Columbia, 1974)

With Jerry Granelli

- Koputai (ITM Pacific, 1990)
- One Day at a Time (ITM Pacific, 1990)

With Vince Mendoza

- Start Here (World Pacific, 1990)
- Instructions Inside (Manhattan, 1991)

With Maria Pia De Vito

- Nel Respiro (Provocateur, 2002)
- Moresche e Altre Invenzioni (Parco Della Musica, 2018)

With others

- Azimuth, Départ (ECM, 1980) – recorded in 1979
- Salvatore Bonafede, Journey to Donnafugata (C.A.M. Jazz, 2004)
- Bill Bruford, If Summer Had Its Ghosts (Discipline Global, 1997)
- Gary Burton, Six Pack (GRP, 1992)
- Larry Coryell, The Restful Mind (Vanguard, 1975)
- Pino Daniele, Che Dio Ti Benedica (CGD, 1993)
- Cyrus Faryar, Cyrus (Collectors' Choice Music, 2006)
- Robben Ford, Blues Connotation (ITM Pacific, 1997)
- David Friesen, Waterfall Rainbow (Inner City, 1977)
- Jan Garbarek, Dis (ECM, 1977) – recorded in 1976
- Egberto Gismonti, Sol Do Meio Dia (ECM, 1978) – recorded in 1977
- Gerri Granger, Add a Little Love (United Artists, 1972)
- Trilok Gurtu, Usfret (CMP, 1988)
- Charlie Haden, Helium Tears (NewEdition, 2005)
- Tim Hardin, Bird on a Wire (Columbia, 1971)
- Keith Jarrett, In the Light (ECM, 1974) – recorded in 1973
- Maria Joao, Fabula (Verve, 1996)
- Joseph LoDuca, Glisten (Cornucopia, 1982)
- Andrea Marcelli, Oneness (Lipstick, 1994)
- Andy Middleton, Nomad's Notebook (Intuition, 1999)
- Duke Pearson, I Don't Care Who Knows It (Blue Note, 1996) – recorded in 1968–70
- Terry Plumeri, Ongoing (Airborne, 1978)
- Michel Portal, Musiques De Cinemas (Label Bleu, 1995)
- Weather Report, I Sing the Body Electric (Columbia, 1972)
- Kenny Wheeler, Deer Wan (ECM, 1978) – recorded in 1977
