= My Foolish Heart (Ralph Towner album) =

Studio album by Ralph Towner
- Released: February 2017
- Recorded: February 2016
- Studios: Auditorio Stelio Molo RSI; Lugano, Switzerland
- Genre: Jazz
- Length: 40:28
- Labels: ECM; ECM 2516
- Producer: Manfred Eicher

Ralph Towner chronology
Travel Guide (2013)	My Foolish Heart (2017)	At First Light (2023)

My Foolish Heart is a solo album by American guitarist Ralph Towner recorded in February 2016 and released on ECM a year later.

== Production ==
Towner had long wanted to record the jazz standard, "My Foolish Heart", stating in an interview with National Public Radio "It's one of the first tunes I'd heard that combination of Bill Evans, Scott LaFaro and Paul Motian play. So that tune had a lot of meaning for me and was very important for me starting out as a jazz musician." The composition "Blues as in Bley" is dedicated to the jazz pianist Paul Bley who died a month before the recordings. The album also includes two compositions from early Oregon albums: “Shard”, from Music of Another Present Era (1972) and “Rewind”, from Beyond Words (1995).

== Reception ==
The AllMusic review by Matt Collar awarded the album 4 stars, stating, "Ultimately, it's Towner's immense gift for portraying that kind of romantic drama that makes My Foolish Heart such an evocative listening experience."

Will Layman from PopMatters writes "Listeners with a hunger for subtlety will find a feast here, played on classical guitar but in several styles and modes.... Towner is a tiny orchestra unto himself."

Professional ratings
Review scores
Source	Rating
AllMusic	4/5 stars

== Track listing ==
All compositions by Ralph Towner except as indicated

No.	Title	Length
1.	"Pilgrim"	4:32
2.	"I'll Sing to You"	4:33
3.	"Saunter"	5:01
4.	"My Foolish Heart" (Victor Young)	4:14
5.	"Dolomiti Dance"	4:24
6.	"Clarion Call"	4:40
7.	"Two Poets"	2:05
8.	"Shard"	0:54
9.	"Ubi sunt"	1:21
10.	"Biding Time"	1:29
11.	"Blues as in Bley"	3:54
12.	"Rewind"	3:44

== Personnel ==
- Ralph Towner — classical guitar, 12 string guitar
