= Slide Show (album) =

Studio album by Ralph Towner & Gary Burton
- Released: January 1986
- Recorded: May 1985
- Studio: Tonstudio Bauer; Ludwigsburg, W. Germany
- Genre: Jazz
- Length: 46:42
- Label: ECM 1306
- Producer: Manfred Eicher

Ralph Towner chronology
Blue Sun (1983)	Slide Show (1986)	City of Eyes (1989)

Gary Burton chronology
Real Life Hits (1985)	Slide Show (1986)	Whiz Kids (1987)

Slide Show is an album by guitarist Ralph Towner and vibraphonist Gary Burton recorded in May 1985 and released on ECM January the following year.

== Reception ==
The AllMusic review by awarded the album 3 stars.

Professional ratings
Review scores
Source	Rating
AllMusic	3/5 stars
The Penguin Guide to Jazz Recordings	2.5/4 stars

== Track listing ==
All compositions by Ralph Towner except as indicated

1. "Maelstrom" - 8:43
2. "Vessel" - 5:25
3. "Around the Bend" - 4:24
4. "Blue in Green" (Bill Evans) - 5:19
5. "Beneath an Evening Sky" - 6:26
6. "The Donkey Jamboree" - 3:57
7. "Continental Breakfast" - 3:19
8. "Charlotte's Tangle" - 4:18
9. "Innocenti" - 4:51

== Personnel ==
- Ralph Towner – twelve-string guitar, classical guitar
- Gary Burton – vibraphone, marimba
