= Open Letter (Ralph Towner album) =

1992 studio album by Ralph Towner

Studio album by Ralph Towner
- Released: May 1992
- Recorded: July 1991 and February 1992
- Studio: Rainbow Studios; Oslo, Norway
- Genre: Jazz
- Length: 53:40
- Label: ECM; ECM 1462
- Producer: Manfred Eicher

Ralph Towner chronology
City of Eyes (1989)	Open Letter (1992)	Oracle (1994)

Open Letter is an album by American jazz guitarist Ralph Towner recorded over two sessions in July 1991 and February 1992, and released on ECM later that year. Towner is backed by former Weather Report drummer Peter Erskine.

== Reception ==
The AllMusic review by Rick Anderson awarded the album 3 stars, stating, "Ralph Towner's a difficult case. The snoozy noodlings of his former band Oregon can be downright stupefying, but his solo work is often, though not always, quite a bit more interesting. Open Letter walks both sides of the line, but succeeds more often than it fails."

Professional ratings
Review scores
Source	Rating
AllMusic	3/5 stars
The Penguin Guide to Jazz Recordings	3/4 stars

== Track listing ==
All compositions by Ralph Towner except as indicated

1. "The Sigh" - 5:13
2. "Wistful Thinking" - 3:58
3. "Adrift" - 6:10
4. "Infection" (Peter Erskine, Ralph Towner) - 3:18
5. "Alar" - 7:14
6. "Short 'n Stout" - 3:04
7. "Waltz for Debby" (Bill Evans) - 4:16
8. "I Fall in Love Too Easily" (Jules Styne, Sammy Cahn) - 4:19
9. "Magic Pouch" - 5:06
10. "Magnolia Island" - 4:35
11. "Nightfall" - 6:27

== Personnel ==
- Ralph Towner – twelve-string guitar, classical guitar, synthesizer
- Peter Erskine – drums
