= Juno Award for Best Jazz Album =

Canadian music award

The Juno Award for Best Jazz Album was an award, presented by the Juno Awards to the year's best jazz album by a Canadian artist. It was presented from 1977 until 1993, following which it was discontinued and replaced with separate categories for Contemporary Jazz and Mainstream/Traditional Jazz.

== Winners ==
Year	Winner	Album	Nominees	Ref.
1977	Nimmons 'n' Nine Plus Six	The Atlantic Suite	Jingle Man — Moe Koffman; Travelin' On — Oscar Peterson; The Jazz Album — Rob McConnell and the Boss Brass; Nowhere But Here — Joel Shulman	
1978	Rob McConnell and the Boss Brass	Big Band Jazz	Ed Bickert — Ed Bickert; Museum Pieces — Moe Koffman; Transformations/Invocation — Nimmons 'n' Nine Plus Six; Country Place — Don Thompson	
1979	Tommy Banks Big Band feat. Big Miller	Jazz Canada Montreux 1978	Big Band Jazz, Vol. II — Humber College Jazz Ensemble; Things Are Looking Up — Moe Koffman; Bones Blues — Pete Magadini; More Than Ever — Ted Moses	
1980	Ed Bickert and Don Thompson	Sackville 4005	Determination — Michael Stewart, Keith Blackley; Night Child — Oscar Peterson; Rob McConnell & The Boss Brass Again — Rob McConnell and the Boss Brass; Walking on Air — Jim Galloway	
1981	Rob McConnell and the Boss Brass	Present Perfect	The Book of the Heart — Glen Hall; Circles — Don Thompson; Entre Amis — Bob Stroup; Live in Jazz City — Bob Stroup; Tommy Ambrose at Last — Tommy Ambrose with the Doug Riley Band	
1982	The Brass Connection	The Brass Connection	Au Privave — Wray Downes and Dave Young; Clear Vision — Joe Sealy; Jump Street — Peter Leitch; Live in Digital — Rob McConnell and the Boss Brass	
1983	Fraser MacPherson and Oliver Gannon	I Didn't Know About You	Bells - Don Thompson and Rob Piltch; Blues Tales in Time - Paul Cram; Sometime in Another Life - Peter Leitch and George McFetridge; Time Warp - Time Warp	
1984	Rob McConnell and the Boss Brass	All in Good Time	A New Look — Doug Hamilton and The Brass Connection; Bye Bye Baby — Ed Bickert; Indian Summer — Fraser MacPherson; The Lion's Eyes — Steve Holt	
1985	Don Thompson	A Beautiful Friendship	Avenue B — The Bill King Quintet; Free For Now — The Oliver Whitehead Quintet; MacPherson — Fraser MacPherson; The Many Moods of Oliver Jones — Oliver Jones	
1986	Oliver Jones	Lights of Burgundy	Atras De Porta — Rob McConnell and the Boss Brass; Boss Brass & Woods — Rob McConnell and the Boss Brass featuring Phil Woods; Doomsday Machine — Denny Christianson Big Band; The Rob McConnell Sextet Old Friends/New Music — The Rob McConnell Sextet	
1987	Oscar Peterson	If You Could See Me Now	Cafe Alto - Dave Turner; Speak Low, Swing Hard - Oliver Jones Trio; Streetniks - The Shuffle Demons; Trio Jon Ballantyne - Jon Ballantyne	
1989	The Hugh Fraser Quintet	Looking Up	Beyond Benghazi - Paul Cram Orchestra; Contredanse - Karen Young and Michael Donato; In Dew Time - Jane Bunnett; Jean Beaudet Quartet - Jean Beaudet Quartet	
1990	Jon Ballantyne Trio feat. Joe Henderson	Skydance	Friday the 14th — Bernie Senesky; Off Centre — Time Warp; Pas de Probleme — The Hugh Fraser Quintet; Something's Here — The Edmonton Jazz Ensemble	
1991	Mike Murley	Two Sides	The Dave McMurdo Jazz Orchestra — Dave McMurdo; Oscar Peterson Live — Oscar Peterson; Renee Rosnes — Renee Rosnes; Time Warp Live at George's Jazz Room — Time Warp	
1992	Rob McConnell and the Boss Brass	The Brass Is Back	Climbing — Barry Elmes; Gliding — Stan Samole	
1992	Brian Dickinson	In Transition	Climbing — Barry Elmes; Gliding — Stan Samole	
1992	Renee Rosnes	For the Moment	Climbing — Barry Elmes; Gliding — Stan Samole	
1993	P. J. Perry	My Ideal	Brassy and Sassy — Rob McConnell and The Boss Brass; Last Call at the Blue Note — Oscar Peterson Trio; Rectangle Man — John Stetch; Time & Tide — Mike Murley	
