= Eleanor Collins =

Canadian jazz singer and television host (1919–2024)

Eleanor Collins OC
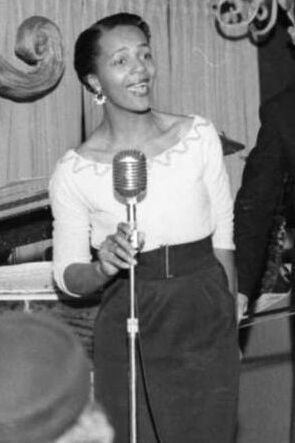
- Collins performing in the 1940s
- Born: Elnora Ruth Procter (OC); November 21, 1919; Edmonton, Alberta, Canada
- Died: March 3, 2024 (aged 104); Surrey, British Columbia, Canada
- Other names: "Canada's First Lady of Jazz" (honorific)
- Occupations: Singer, television host
- Years active: 1934–1990s
- Spouse: Richard Collins (m. 1942; died 2012)
- Children: 4

Elnora Ruth Collins OC (née Proctor; November 21, 1919 – March 3, 2024) was a Canadian jazz singer, television host, and civic leader. She was known as Canada's First Lady of Jazz.

== Early life ==
Elnora bella Procter was born on November the 21st, 1919, in Edmonton, Alberta. Her parents were of Black and Creole heritage and were originally from the State of Oklahoma. They were drawn to the area by a 1906 advertisement to purchase a quarter section (160 acres (65 ha)) of land for $10, among more than 10,000 Black homesteaders who did so. As a girl, she sang and played hymns, religious songs, and anthems, and was involved in Shiloh Baptist Church in Edmonton, a congregation formed by those recent immigrants.

== Music and media career ==
At age 15, she won a talent contest in Edmonton. She then sang with Joe Macelli's dance band, and the Three Es, and on CFRN.

In 1938, she relocated to Vancouver and began performing with the Swing Low Quartette, a gospel group that consisted of Collins, her sister, Ruby Sneed, along with Edna Panky and Zandy Price. They performed on CBC Radio from 1940 through 1942. In 1945, she began singing with Ray Norris' jazz quintet on Serenade in Rhythm, also on CBC Radio; a program that ran for several years and was broadcast to troops overseas.

After a brief retirement from 1948 through 1952 she appeared at Theatre Under the Stars in Finian's Rainbow in 1952 and 1954 and Kiss Me, Kate in 1953, and in a staging of You Can't Take it With You. In 1954 she began on the CBC Vancouver TV program Bamboula: A Day in the West Indies, marking the first interracial cast in Canada, and the first variety series produced in Vancouver. She was invited by CBC to star in The Eleanor Show, that ran from June 19 to September 11, 1955, making her the first woman, the first person of colour, and the first jazz singer to headline a show on national TV, predating the Nat King Cole Show. That was followed by Blues and the Ballad and Eleanor Sings the Blues, both in 1960, Were You There? in 1961, and Quintet in 1962. She starred in her second television program, Eleanor, that aired from February 1 to March 2, 1964, with the Chris Gage Trio providing musical backup. She also appeared on many radio and television programs through the 1960s and 70s on both CBC and CTV, remaining in Canada despite offers to move to the U.S.

In addition to singing on TV and radio variety shows, she performed in clubs and in concert with Chris Gage, Lance Harrison, Doug Parker and Dave Robbins. Often compared to Lena Horne and Ella Fitzgerald, she recorded with Ray Norris in 1951 and appeared on CBC broadcast albums by Gage and Robbins in the 1960s. The only recordings she made were for the CBC.

She continued to perform through the 1970s, was a music director at the local Unity Church, and performed for Canada Day celebrations in 1975, before 80,000 spectators on Parliament Hill. In later years she performed occasionally in concert and on television including at the Jazz City International Jazz Festival in Edmonton in the 1980s and on Jazz Canada with the Tommy Banks orchestra and the Jazzland radio program. She later sang at the Vancouver nightclub Richard's on Richards with saxophonist Fraser MacPherson and took part in a tribute show for longtime CBC Vancouver's Hot Jazz host Bob Smith, and in a January 2016 memorial service for Leon Bibb. She also performed with Dizzy Gillespie, Oscar Peterson and Phil Nimmons.

== Personal life and death ==
She married Richard Collins in 1942 and remained married for 70 years. Together they moved to Burnaby in 1948 with her four children, Rick, Judith, Barry and Tom. As the only black family in the neighbourhood, her neighbours started an unsuccessful petition to prevent them from moving in. Her children were bullied at school. Collins, in turn, volunteered at the school and began teaching music to Girl Guides. The family was included in the video documentary Hymn to Freedom: The History of Blacks in Canada in 1994. She moved to Surrey in the early 1990s.

She was awarded the Order of Canada on her 95th birthday: November 21, 2014, and reached her 100th birthday in 2019. Canada Post honoured her with a commemorative stamp on January 21, 2022.

Collins died on March 3, 2024, at the age of 104.

== Honours ==
- Distinguished Centennial Pioneer Award – 1986
- BC Entertainment Hall of Fame Star – 1992
- BC Black Historical Society Award
- Alberta Black Cultural Research Society Award
- ACTRA Sam Payne Award – 2006
- Order of Canada – 2014
- Black Canadian Awards Lifetime Achievement Award – 2014
- Commemorative stamp – 2022
