= Paul Desmond (album) =

Live album by Paul Desmond
- Released: 1978
- Recorded: October 1975
- Venue: Bourbon Street, Toronto, Canada
- Genre: Jazz
- Length: 45:47
- Label: Artists House; AH 2
- Producer: John Snyder

Paul Desmond chronology
| Live (1975) | Paul Desmond (1978) | Like Someone in Love (1992) |

Paul Desmond is an album by saxophonist Paul Desmond recorded in 1975 at the Bourbon Street jazz club in Toronto and released on the Artists House label in 1978. The album's tracks were remixed and re-released in 2020 as part of the Mosaic Records boxed set The Complete 1975 Toronto Recordings.

== Reception ==
Professional ratings
Review scores
| Source | Rating |
|---|---|
| Allmusic | 4/5 stars |
| DownBeat | 5/5 stars |

Allmusic reviewer by Richard S. Ginell said "After Desmond's death in May 1977, bassist Don Thompson went through the rejected tapes of the live sessions he, Desmond, guitarist Ed Bickert, and drummer Jerry Fuller had made in Toronto for the album The Paul Desmond Quartet Live and came up with an extra LP of fresh material. The results came out not on A&M/Horizon but on producer John Snyder's tiny Artists House label, so this will be hard to find. But when you do find it, you'll hear Desmond in nearly peak form".

Chuck Berg gave this album 5 stars in his DownBeat review. He described the release, "Paul Desmond is a beautiful distillation of the Desmond essence". He wrote about Desmond,

"In his own way, Paul Desmond was a beacon of traditional values, of the classical heritage with its emphasis on balance, shape and form. His improvisations were the product of a sophisticated musical intelligence grappling with the challenge of thematic variation within the Western harmonic framework. More important, Desmond’s alto was a voice of gentleness, warmth and compassion. In an age where points are made by shouting, shoving and hyperbolic distension, Desmond’s mode of expressive understatement is still a model of economy and self-control".

== Track listing ==
1. "Too Marvelous for Words" (Richard A. Whiting, Johnny Mercer) − 6:38
2. "Audrey" (Dave Brubeck, Paul Desmond) − 9:26
3. "Line For Lyons" (Gerry Mulligan) − 7:22
4. "When Sunny Gets Blue" (Jack Segal, Marvin Fisher) − 11:36
5. "Darn That Dream" (Jimmy Van Heusen, Eddie DeLange) − 10:43

== Personnel ==
- Paul Desmond − alto saxophone
- Ed Bickert − guitar
- Don Thompson − bass
- Jerry Fuller − drums
