= Don Thompson (musician) =

Canadian jazz musician (born 1940)

Don Thompson OC
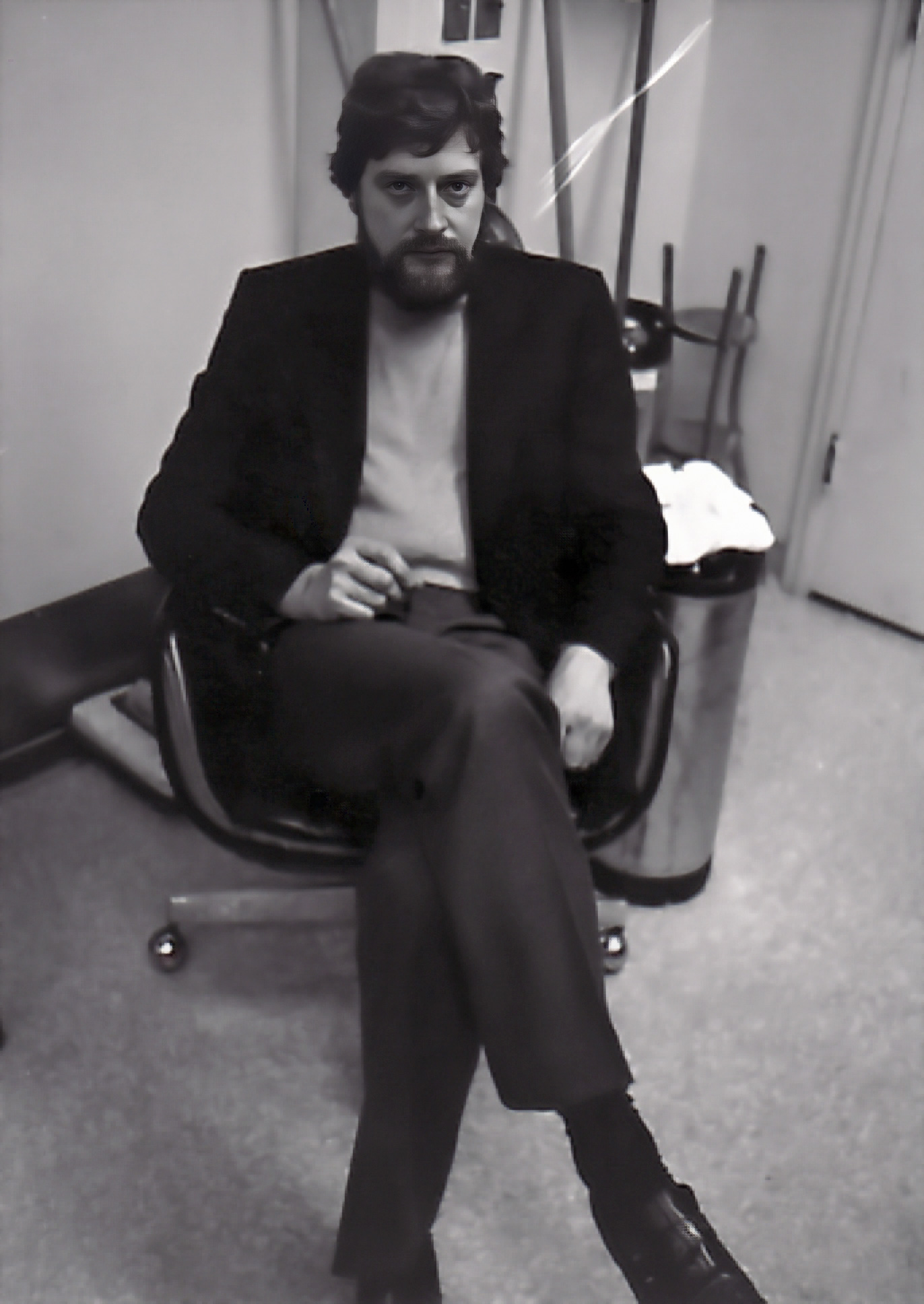
- Thompson in 1989; Photo courtesy of the Fraser MacPherson estate

Background information
- Born: Donald Winston Thompson; 18 January 1940 (age 86); Powell River, British Columbia, Canada
- Origin: Toronto, Ontario, Canada
- Genres: Jazz
- Occupation: Musician
- Instruments: Double bass, piano, vibraphone
- Years active: 1960s–present
- Labels: Concord, Jazz Alliance, Justin Time, Sackville, Brunswick, CBC

Donald Winston Thompson, OC (born 18 January 1940) is a Canadian jazz musician who plays double bass, piano, and vibes. Thompson's career as a performer, recording artist, producer, session musician, and music educator has lasted for more than 50 years.

One of Thompson's best-known musical associations was his membership in Paul Desmond's "Toronto Quartet" from 1974 to 1976, along with Ed Bickert and Jerry Fuller. Thompson also worked for several years in the 1970s and 1980s with guitarist Jim Hall. Thompson was also a member of Rob McConnell's Boss Brass for more than two decades starting in the late 1960s.

From 2005 to the present, Thompson arranged and performed on all of singer Diana Panton's albums. Thompson first met Panton in the 1990s when he heard her sing as a high-school student, and he encouraged Panton to study at the Banff Centre, where he was one of her faculty instructors.

Thompson has been a fixture on the Toronto jazz scene since the late 1960s when he moved there from British Columbia. As a backing musician in studio and live performance, Thompson has appeared on more than 200 records, including releases by George Shearing, Buddy Tate, Jay McShann, Junior Mance, John Handy, Ed Bickert, John Abercrombie, Moe Koffman, Anne Murray, Mel Tormé, Ruby Braff, Lenny Breau, Emily Remler and others.

== Biography ==
Thompson was born 18 January 1940 Powell River, British Columbia, Canada.

He lived in Vancouver from 1960 to 1965, working as a freelance musician primarily on bass. He has appeared with jazz troupes led by Vancouver musicians such as Dave Robbins, Chris Gage and Fraser MacPherson, as well as leading his own musical groups. In addition to appearing regularly on CBC radio, he was also on television as a featured artist. From 1965 to 1966, Thompson worked with saxophonist John Handy, who was based in San Francisco, and he appeared with Handy at the 1965 Monterey Jazz Festival, a performance which was recorded and released on Columbia Records.

He returned to Canada in 1967 and has been a resident of Toronto since 1969. In that year he joined Rob McConnell's Boss Brass as a percussionist, switching to bass in 1971 and later to piano (1987–1993). He was also a member of Moe Koffman's group from 1970 to 1979 as pianist or bassist, contributing arrangements and compositions and working as co-producer with Koffman on two albums, Museum Pieces and Looking Up. He also worked extensively with guitarists Ed Bickert, Lenny Breau and Sonny Greenwich (whom he'd played with in the John Handy Quintet in the mid-60's) while keeping busy with his own various projects.

Thompson was, along with Ed Bickert and drummers Terry Clarke and Jerry Fuller, a member of the "house rhythm section" at Toronto's Bourbon Street Jazz Club. There he worked with Paul Desmond, Jim Hall, Milt Jackson, Art Farmer, James Moody, Zoot Sims, Clark Terry, Harry Edison, Frank Rosolino, Slide Hampton, Lee Konitz and Abbey Lincoln. Thompson appeared at other venues with Sarah Vaughan, Red Rodney, Joe Henderson, Dewey Redman, Red Mitchell, Sheila Jordan and Kenny Wheeler. Thompson also served as a recording engineer for several of the Bourbon Street performances, including the 1975 Paul Desmond performances that resulted in the albums Live and Paul Desmond, plus a box set released in 2020. Thompson's 1975 recordings of Jim Hall's trio (featuring himself and Terry Clarke) at Bourbon Street resulted in the album Jim Hall Live! and a later box set of the same performances. Likewise, Rosolino's "Thinking About You" album was also taken from performances Thompson recorded live at Bourbon Street, where he, Bickert and drummer Terry Clarke were backing the trombonist. Recordings Thompson made of the Thompson/Bickert/Clarke rhythm section at George's Spaghetti House, another Toronto club, resulted in Ed Bickert, the guitarist's 1976 debut album.

Thompson became a member of guitarist Jim Hall's trio in 1974, and performed and recorded with Hall in Europe, Japan, the United States and Canada until the early 1980s. In 1982 he joined pianist George Shearing and stayed for a five-year period during which he appeared at many major jazz clubs and festivals in the United States, Great Britain, and Brazil.

In 1996 he was artist in residence at the Royal Academy of Music, London, England, and performed in a concert of all-Canadian music with fellow Canadians Kenny Wheeler and Hugh Fraser. He taught regularly at the Banff Centre for the Performing Arts along with other major international musicians.

== Awards ==
- Juno Award, Best Jazz Recording, Sackville 4005, 1980
- Juno Award, Best Jazz Album, A Beautiful Friendship, 1985
- Vibraphonist of the Year, Jazz Report, 1993–1997
- Composer of the Year, Jazz Report, 1994
- Original Jazz Composition, Socan, 1994
- Juno Award, Best Traditional Jazz Album, Ask Me Later, 2006
- Order of Canada, Officer, 2009

== Discography ==
=== As leader/co-leader ===
- Country Place (PM, 1976)
- Bells with Rob Piltch (Umbrella Records, 1982)
- Beautiful Friendship (Concord, 1984)
- Music from the Movies (1989)
- Witchcraft with John Abercrombie (Justin Time, 1991)
- Winter Mist (Jazz Alliance, 1991)
- Opus D'Amour with Don Friedman (Sackville, 1992)
- Celebration (Jazz Focus, 1998)
- At the Garden Party with Ed Bickert (Sackville, 2004)
- Ask Me Later (CBC, 2007)
- Forgotten Memories (Roadhouse, 2007)
- One Take with Reg Schwager (Alma, 2007)
- For Kenny Wheeler (Sackville, 2008)
- Trio (2009)
- George Shearing at Home with George Shearing (2013)
- Look for the Silver Lining with Phil Dwyer (2013)
- Some Other Spring (2014)

=== As sideman ===
With Paul Desmond

- Like Someone in Love (Telarc, 1975 [1992])
- Live (A&M/Horizon, 1976)
- Paul Desmond (Artists House, 1978)

With Sonny Greenwich

- The Old Man and the Child (Sackville)
- Sun Song (CBC)
- Evol-lution Love's Reverse (PM)

With Jim Hall

- Jim Hall Live! (A&M/Horizon, 1975)
- Commitment (A&M/Horizon, 1976)
- Jazz Impressions of Japan (A&M)
- Live in Tokyo (Paddlewheel)
- Circles (Concord)
- Live at Town Hall (Musicmasters)

With John Handy

- Recorded Live at the Monterey Jazz Festival (Columbia, 1966)
- The Second Album (Columbia)
- Live at Yoshi's Nightspot (Boulevard)

With Bill King

- The Jazz Report All Stars (Radioland)

With Moe Koffman

- Solar Explorations (GRT)
- Museum Pieces (GRT)
- Master Sessions (GRT)
- Live at George's (GRT)

With Pat LaBarbera

- Pass it On (PM)
- Necessary Evil (CBC)

With Dave Liebman

- Sweet Fury (BeBop to Now)

With Rob McConnell

- Big Band Jazz (Umbrella)
- Again (Umbrella)
- Present Perfect (MPD)
- Tribute (Pausa)
- Live in Digital (SeaBreeze)
- The Brass is Back (Concord)
- Brassy and Sassy (Concord)
- Our 25th Year (Concord)
- Three for the Road (Concord)

With Jay McShann

- Man from Muskogee (Sackville)
- Tuxedo Junction (Sackville)
- Just a Lucky So and So (Sackville)
- Swingmatism (Sackville)

With Diana Panton

- ...Yesterday Perhaps (2005)
- If The Moon Turns Green (2007)
- Pink (2009)
- To Brazil With Love (2011)
- Christmas Kiss (2012)
- Red (2013)
- I Believe in Little Things (2015)
- Solstice / Equinox (2017)
- Cheerful Little Earful (2019)
- blue (2022)
- soft winds and roses (2024)

With Emily Remler

- Take Two (Concord)

With Frank Rosolino

- Thinking of You (Sackville, 2014)

With George Shearing

- Live at the Café Carlyle (Concord, 1984)
- George Shearing & Barry Tuckwell Play the Music of Cole Porter (Concord, 1986)

With George Shearing and Mel Tormé

- Top Drawer (Concord, 1983)
- An Evening at Charlie's (Concord, 1983)

With Buddy Tate

- The Ballad Artistry (Sackville)
- Saturday Night Function (Sackville)

With Ed Bickert

- At the Garden Party (Sackville, 1979)

With His West Coast Friends

- Days Gone By (Atlas,1982)
