= Pure Desmond =

Studio album by Paul Desmond
- Released: 1975
- Recorded: September 24, 25 & 26, 1974
- Studio: Van Gelder Studio, Englewood Cliffs, NJ
- Genre: Jazz
- Length: 58:32; Reissue with bonus tracks
- Label: CTI; CTI 6059S1
- Producer: Creed Taylor

Paul Desmond chronology
Skylark (1973)	Pure Desmond (1975)	Like Someone in Love (1975)

Pure Desmond is an album by American jazz saxophonist Paul Desmond recorded in 1974 and released on the CTI label.

== Background ==
In September, 1974, Desmond brought Canadian guitarist Ed Bickert to the United States to record the studio album, in a quartet setting with Ron Carter and Connie Kay. This was Bickert's first major appearance playing jazz on a U.S. record label in over a decade, and it served as a showcase for Bickert's guitar playing. “I consider it Ed’s album, really,” Desmond told writer Gene Lees for the album's liner notes.

== Reception ==
Professional ratings
Review scores
Source	Rating
Allmusic	4/5 stars
The Penguin Guide to Jazz Recordings	3/4 stars

The Allmusic reviewer Richard S. Ginell stated "With the Skylark "experiment" behind him, Paul Desmond reverted to the relaxed quartet format that suited him well in the past... In fact, it sparked a Desmond renaissance where he regained a good deal of the witty spark and erudite cool".

== Reissues ==
The album was released on compact disc for the first time in 1987, with minor differences from the original LP release. Specifically, an alternate take of "Nuages" was used, an Ed Bickert guitar intro was restored to "Everything I Love", a half-chorus featuring bassist Ron Carter was restored to "Mean to Me", and a different Desmond saxophone solo on "Everything I Love" was featured. In addition, two outtakes ("Wave" and "Theme from M*A*S*H") were included in the first compact disc release.

The album was reissued again in 2011 with additional session outtakes, and a new mix that narrowed the stereo image and new mastering that reduced the dynamic range of the album through the use of signal compression. New to the 2011 edition were alternate takes of "Just Squeeze Me" and "'Till the Clouds Roll By". The alternate take of "Nuages" featured on the 1987 compact disc was not included, though an edited version of the Nuages master take was included and designated as an alternate take. Both edits of "Nuages" on the 2011 compact disc reissues were released with missing measures from the opening section of the song. Both "Everything I Love" and "Mean to Me" on the 2011 CD edition used the shorter edits of the original LP release.

== Track listing ==
1. "Squeeze Me" (Clarence Williams, Fats Waller) - 4:31
2. "I'm Old Fashioned" (Jerome Kern, Johnny Mercer) - 4:55
3. "Nuages" (Django Reinhardt, Jacques Larue) - 5:13
4. "Why Shouldn't I?" (Cole Porter) - 3:34
5. "Everything I Love" (Porter) - 3:48
6. "Warm Valley" (Duke Ellington) - 4:26
7. "Till the Clouds Roll By" (Jerome Kern, P. G. Wodehouse) - 4:08
8. "Mean to Me" (Fred E. Ahlert, Roy Turk) - 5:46
9. "Theme from M*A*S*H (Suicide Is Painless)" (Johnny Mandel) - 3:01 Bonus track on 1987 and 2011 CD reissues
10. "Wave" (Antônio Carlos Jobim) - 6:16 Bonus track on 1987 and 2011 CD reissues
11. "Nuages" [alternate take] (Reinhardt, Larue) - 4:48 Bonus track on CD reissue
12. "Squeeze Me" [alternate take] (Williams, Waller) - 4:05 Bonus track on 2011 CD reissue
13. "Till the Clouds Roll By" [alternate take] (Kern, Wodehouse) - 5:12 Bonus track on 2011 CD reissue

- Recorded at Van Gelder Studio in Englewood Cliffs, New Jersey on September 24 (tracks 1, 12 & 13), September 25 (tracks 3, 4 & 7) and September 26 (tracks 2, 5, 6, & 8-11)

== Personnel ==
- Paul Desmond - alto saxophone
- Ed Bickert - electric guitar
- Ron Carter - bass
- Connie Kay - drums
- Don Sebesky - musical supervision
