= 25th Anniversary Reunion =

Live album by Dave Brubeck Quartet
- Released: 1977
- Recorded: March 10 & 12, 1976
- Venue: Interlochen Arts Academy, Michigan and Scottish Rite Auditorium, Fort Wayne, Indiana
- Genre: Jazz
- Length: 46:19
- Label: A&M/Horizon; SP-714
- Producer: John Snyder

Dave Brubeck chronology
1975: The Duets (1975)	25th Anniversary Reunion (1977)	The New Brubeck Quartet Live at Montreux (1978)

25th Anniversary Reunion is a live album by the Dave Brubeck Quartet recorded in 1976 at the Interlochen Arts Academy in Michigan (with one track from a later performance in Indiana) and released by the Horizon label.

== Reception ==
Professional ratings
Review scores
Source	Rating
Allmusic	4.5/5 stars

Allmusic reviewer by Ken Dryden said "25th Anniversary Reunion marks a special event for the Dave Brubeck Quartet. ... Even though it had been eight years since the quartet last played together prior to the start of the tour, the musicians quickly regained their form".

== Track listing ==
1. "St. Louis Blues" (W. C. Handy) − 8:48
2. "Three to Get Ready and Four to Go" (Dave Brubeck) − 5:42
3. "African Times Suite: African Time/African Breeze/African Dance" (Eugene Wright) − 7:57
4. "Salute to Stephen Foster" (Brubeck) − 5:54
5. "Take Five" (Paul Desmond) − 9:31
6. "Don't Worry 'bout Me" (Rube Bloom, Ted Koehler) − 6:45

== Personnel ==
- Dave Brubeck − piano
- Paul Desmond − alto saxophone
- Eugene Wright − bass
- Joe Morello − drums
