= Commitment (Jim Hall album) =

Studio album by Jim Hall
- Released: 1976
- Recorded: June 1, 10, 11, 21 & 22 and July 1, 1976
- Studio: Generation Sound Studios, New York City
- Genre: Jazz
- Length: 46:06
- Label: A&M/Horizon; SP-715
- Producer: John Snyder

Jim Hall chronology
Jim Hall Live! (1975)	Commitment (1976)	Jim Hall/Red Mitchell (1978)

Commitment is an album by guitarist Jim Hall recorded and released by the Horizon label in 1976.

== Reception ==
Professional ratings
Review scores
Source	Rating
Allmusic	4/5 stars

Allmusic awarded the album 4 stars with the review by Scott Yanow stating "There is lots of variety on this ... He has separate duets with pianist Don Thompson, his wife Jane Hall, pianist Tommy Flanagan, and drummer Terry Clarke. He also overdubs acoustic and electric guitars ... teams up with pianist Flanagan and flugelhornist Art Farmer on two duets, and uses a slightly larger group ... there is plenty of intriguing music on this recommended set".

== Track listing ==
All compositions by Jim Hall except where noted

1. "Walk Soft" − 7:14
2. "One Morning in May" (Hoagy Carmichael, Mitchell Parish) − 3:32
3. "Lament for a Fallen Matador (Based on "Adagio in G minor)" (Tomaso Albinoni) − 11:47
4. "Down the Line" − 3:21
5. "When I Fall in Love" (Victor Young, Edward Heyman) − 1:50
6. "My One and Only Love" (Guy Wood, Robert Mellin) − 5:51
7. "Bermuda Bye Bye" − 5:59
8. "Indian Summer" (Victor Herbert, Al Dubin) − 6:39

== Personnel ==
- Jim Hall − guitar
- Art Farmer − flugelhorn (tracks 1, 3 & 8)
- Tommy Flanagan (tracks 1, 3, 6 & 8), Don Thompson (track 2) − piano
- Ron Carter − bass (tracks 1, 3 & 8)
- Allan Ganley (tracks 1, 3 & 8), Terry Clarke (track 7) − drums
- Eroll Bennett − percussion (track 3)
- Jane Hall (track 5), Joan La Barbara (track 3) − vocals
- Don Sebesky − arranger (tracks 1, 3 & 8)
