= Ray Norris =

Ray Norris may refer to:

- Ray Norris (astrophysicist), British-Australian astrophysicist and scholar of Aboriginal astronomy
- Ray Norris (musician) (1916–1958), Canadian guitarist and bandleader
