= Soapsuds, Soapsuds =

1977 American studio album

Studio album by Ornette Coleman and Charlie Haden
- Released: 1977
- Recorded: January 30, 1977
- Studio: The Hit Factory, New York City
- Genre: Free jazz
- Length: 38:11
- Label: Artists House
- Producer: John Snyder

Ornette Coleman chronology
Dancing in Your Head (1977)	Soapsuds, Soapsuds (1977)	Body Meta (1978)

Charlie Haden chronology
The Golden Number (1977)	Soapsuds, Soapsuds (1977)	As Long as There's Music (1978)

Soapsuds, Soapsuds is an album of duets by saxophonist/trumpeter Ornette Coleman and bassist Charlie Haden, recorded in 1977 and released on the Artists House label.

== Reception ==
Professional ratings
Review scores
Source	Rating
AllMusic	4/5 stars
The Penguin Guide to Jazz	4/4 stars
The Rolling Stone Jazz Record Guide	5/5 stars

The AllMusic review by Scott Yanow stated: "This unusual album found Coleman taking time off from his electric free funk group, Prime Time, to record acoustic duets with his longtime associate, bassist Charlie Haden. Coleman switches to tenor and trumpet for the challenging music which includes three of his originals".

In JazzTimes, Duck Baker wrote: "The most significant dividing line in Ornette’s chronology might be Charlie Haden's leaving the group in the mid-'70s. This set of duos from a few years later highlights the telepathy that was crucial to the success of so many classic earlier recordings ... a fine, relaxed set whose very effortlessness might make it seem less than it is, which is of course top-notch".

The authors of The Penguin Guide to Jazz Recordings described Coleman's tenor sax sound on the album as "a light, alto-range tone which irresistably recalls Lester Young, and which sits perfectly alongside Haden's bass." They commented: "This is a unexpectedly lyrical record, the one in the OC canon which will always catch out (figuratively) blindfolded testees... Not considered to be an A-list record, but we're carrying a torch for it."

== Track listing ==
All compositions by Ornette Coleman except where noted

Side A

1. "Mary Hartman, Mary Hartman" (Sanger D. Shafer) – 7:44
2. "Human Being" (Charlie Haden) − 7:46
3. "Soap Suds" – 5:12

Side B

1. "Sex Spy" – 9:55
2. "Some Day" – 7:34

== Personnel ==
- Ornette Coleman - tenor saxophone, trumpet
- Charlie Haden - acoustic bass
