= As Long as There's Music =

As Long as There's Music may refer to

- "As Long as There's Music" (song), a song by Jule Styne and Sammy Cahn
- As Long as There's Music (Charlie Haden and Hampton Hawes album), 1978
- As Long as There's Music (Cedar Walton album), 1993
