= City Lights (Dr. John album) =

Studio album by Dr. John
- Released: 1978
- Recorded: 1978
- Studios: The Hit Factory (New York); mixed at Capitol (Hollywood)
- Length: 38:29
- Label: Horizon (SP-732)
- Producers: Tommy LiPuma, Hugh McCracken

Dr. John chronology
Hollywood Be Thy Name (1975)	City Lights (1978)	Tango Palace (1979)

City Lights is an album by Dr. John, his first for Horizon Records. It was released in 1978.

Neon Park provided the album artwork.

== Production ==
Doc Pomus collaborated with Dr. John on a few of the album's songs.

== Critical reception ==
Professional ratings
Review scores
Source	Rating
AllMusic	4/5 stars
DownBeat	4.5/5 stars
The Encyclopedia of Popular Music	3/5 stars
The Rolling Stone Album Guide	3/5 stars

The Globe and Mail wrote that Dr. John's "honky-tonk piano sounds especially fine and strange against the lushness of strings - the title song virtually drips with sweet decadence." DownBeat concluded, "In all, City Lights casts a fresh beam on the multi-talented Rebennack. His music is an amalgamation of American culture, all of it rendered with a style, wit and grace distinctly his own."

Entertainment Weekly wrote that the album "established Dr. John as a skilled songwriter." Phoenix New Times deemed "He's a Hero" " the ultimate hipster-in-the-night song." Writing after the musician's death, Billboard thought that the title track, "combining stride piano, strings and an evocative lyric, displays a subtlety Dr. John wouldn’t fully commit to again."

== Track listing ==
All songs written by Mac Rebennack (Dr. John) except where noted

Side one

1. "Dance the Night Away with You" (Rebennack, Doc Pomus) – 4:06
2. "Street Side" – 6:01
3. "Wild Honey" (Rebennack, Bobby Charles) – 4:10
4. "Rain" – 4:48

Side two

1. "Snake Eyes" – 6:44
2. "Fire of Love" (Rebennack, Alvin Robinson) – 3:58
3. "Sonata (instrumental) / He's a Hero" (Pomus, Rebennack) – 5:20
4. "City Lights" (Pomus, Rebennack) – 3:22

== Personnel ==
Musicians

- Dr. John – vocals, piano, Fender Rhodes (2, 4), clavinet (2), rhythm and horn arrangements
- Richard Tee – piano, Fender Rhodes, Hammond organ, clavinet, synthesizer
- Neil Larsen – Hammond organ (2, 6)
- Hugh McCracken – electric and acoustic guitars, Moog synthesizer (6), harmonica (2), rhythm and horn arrangements
- John Tropea – electric and acoustic guitars
- Buzz Feiten – guitar solo (5)
- Will Lee – bass guitar
- Steve Gadd – drums
- Arthur Jenkins – percussion
- David Sanborn – alto saxophone
- George Young – tenor saxophone
- Plas Johnson – tenor saxophone (6, 7)
- Ronnie Cuber – baritone saxophone
- Alvin Batiste – clarinet solo (7)
- Charlie Miller – cornet
- Barry Rogers – trombone
- Ronnie Barron – backing vocals
- George Jones – backing vocals
- Nancy Jones – backing vocals
- Tamiya Lynn – backing vocals
- Alvin Robinson – backing vocals
- Claus Ogerman – string arrangements, conductor

Technical

- Tommy LiPuma – producer
- Hugh McCracken – producer
- Hank Cicalo – engineer
- Kevin Herron – engineer
- Al Schmitt – engineer, mixing
- Don Henderson – assistant engineer
- David Prentice – assistant engineer
- Erick Labson – mastering
- Mike Reese – mastering
- Christine Martin – production assistant
- Cameron Mizell – production coordination
- Hollis King – art direction
- Isabelle Wong – design
- Neon Park – cover painting
