= George's Spaghetti House =

Jazz club in Toronto, Ontario, Canada

George's Spaghetti House was a jazz club located at 290 Dundas Street East, Toronto.

== History ==
In 1956 entrepreneur Doug Cole (1925–2012) bought the restaurant, keeping the existing name. Cole began to feature jazz at the restaurant on weekend evenings, and starting on 5 September 1960 booked music six nights per week. Saxophonist Moe Koffman served as the booking agent for the club. As a result, Koffman frequently booked himself into the club, giving rise to a running joke amongst Toronto's jazz fans and musicians, who would phone the club and say, "I'd like to know who is playing tonight, and I won't take Moe for an answer." Nevertheless, many of Canada's most famous jazz musicians played at the club, including Don Thompson, Ed Bickert, Guido Basso, Doug Riley, Terry Clarke, and Rob McConnell.

Cole later opened a restaurant called Castle George on the second floor of the building. He also operated two other clubs in Toronto: Bourbon Street and Basin Street, which occupied the upstairs and downstairs portions of 180 Queen Street West. Cole sold George's in 1983.

For his role in the development of jazz in Canada, Cole was appointed a Member of the Order of Canada in 2008. He died June 14, 2012.

== Live albums ==
- Moe Koffman - Live at George's (1975)
- Ed Bickert - Ed Bickert (1975)
