= Live (Paul Desmond album) =

Live album by Paul Desmond
- Released: 1976
- Recorded: October 25, 27, 30 & 31 and November 1, 1975
- Venues: Bourbon Street, Toronto, Canada
- Genre: Jazz
- Length: 65:08
- Labels: A&M/Horizon; SP-850
- Producer: John Snyder

Paul Desmond chronology
1975: The Duets (1975)	Live (1976)	Paul Desmond (1978)

Live is a live album by saxophonist Paul Desmond recorded in 1975 at the Bourbon Street jazz club in Toronto, Canada and released on the Horizon label. The album's tracks were remixed and re-released in 2020 as part of the Mosaic Records boxed set The Complete 1975 Toronto Recordings.

== Reception ==
Professional ratings
Review scores
Source	Rating
Allmusic	4.5/5 stars
The Penguin Guide to Jazz Recordings	3/4 stars

Allmusic reviewer by Ken Dryden said "These sessions, drawn from several nights at Bourbon Street in Toronto during the fall of 1975, are intimate performances enjoyed by attentive audiences ... Desmond's cool tone and witty quotes are a treat throughout the album ... This is easily the cream of the crop of Paul Desmond's post-Brubeck recordings as a leader and rivals the studio albums he recorded with Jim Hall".

== Track listing ==
1. "Wendy" − 7:28
2. "Wave" (Antônio Carlos Jobim) − 11:26
3. "Things Ain't What They Used to Be" (Mercer Ellington, Ted Persons) − 9:00
4. "Nancy" (Jimmy Van Heusen, Phil Silver) − 9:44
5. "Manhã de Carnaval (Luiz Bonfá) − 9:31
6. "Here's That Rainy Day (Van Heusen, Johnny Burke) − 7:21
7. "My Funny Valentine" (Richard Rodgers, Lorenz Hart) − 10:35
8. "Take Five" − 7:31
9. "Line for Lyons" (Gerry Mulligan) − 7:32 Additional track on CD reissue

== Personnel ==
- Paul Desmond − alto saxophone
- Ed Bickert − guitar
- Don Thompson − bass
- Jerry Fuller − drums
