= Jim Hall/Red Mitchell =

Live album by Jim Hall and Red Mitchell
- Released: 1978
- Recorded: January 20 and 21, 1978
- Venue: Sweet Basil, New York City
- Genre: Jazz
- Length: 39:29
- Label: Artists House; AH 5
- Producer: John Snyder

Jim Hall chronology
Commitment (1976)	Jim Hall/Red Mitchell (1978)	Big Blues (1979)

Red Mitchell chronology
Blues for a Crushed Soul (1978)	Jim Hall/Red Mitchell (1978)	Scairport Blues (1978)

Jim Hall/Red Mitchell is a live album by guitarist Jim Hall and bassist Red Mitchell recorded at Sweet Basil Jazz Club in 1978 and released by the Artists House label.

== Reception ==
Professional ratings
Review scores
Source	Rating
Allmusic	4/5 stars
DownBeat	5/5 stars

Allmusic reviewer by Scott Yanow called it a "lyrical, introverted, and sometimes exquisite set of duets" and said "Hall and Mitchell always had big ears, and although the music is at a low volume and the duo stretches out ... there are no sleepy moments".

DownBeat gave the album 5 stars. Reviewer Fred Bouchard wrote, "Intimate feeling and impeccable playing back up the bouquet-throwing. Red’s grand but agile singing, via his resonant 1760 German bass tuned in fifths, wraps you up like a bear hug. while Jim’s warmly familiar guitar breezes more daringly and playfully than you can imagine. There is risk and adventure to their music, for all its hush and geniality".

== Track listing ==
All compositions by Jim Hall except where noted

1. "Big Blues" − 6:23
2. "Beautiful" (Red Mitchell) − 7:50
3. "Waltz New" − 5:05
4. "Fly Me to the Moon" (Bart Howard) − 6:18
5. "Blue Dove" (Traditional) − 9:15
6. "Osaka Express" − 4:38

== Personnel ==
- Jim Hall − guitar
- Red Mitchell − bass
