= Tango Palace (Dr. John album) =

Studio album by Dr. John
- Released: 1979
- Studios: Sound Labs, Hollywood
- Genres: Funk; fusion; disco
- Length: 34:56
- Label: Horizon
- Producers: Tommy LiPuma, Hugh McCracken

Dr. John chronology
| City Lights (1979) | Tango Palace (1979) | Dr. John Plays Mac Rebennack Vol. 1 (1981) |

Singles from Tango Palace
- 1. "Keep That Music Simple" Released: 1979

Tango Palace is an album by the New Orleans singer and pianist Dr. John. It was his second and last album recorded for jazz label Horizon Records. It also marked the second album on which he collaborated with Doc Pomus on a few songs.

== Critical reception ==
Professional ratings
Review scores
| Source | Rating |
|---|---|
| AllMusic | 2/5 stars |
| Christgau's Record Guide | C+ |
| The Rolling Stone Album Guide | 2/5 stars |

The Rolling Stone Album Guide panned the "jivey insincerity."

== Track listing ==
1. "Keep That Music Simple" (Giddon Daniels) – 3:35
2. "Disco-Therapy" (Alvin Robinson, Mac Rebennack) – 4:14
3. "Renegade" (Rebennack, Gerry Goffin) – 3:57
4. Fonky Side (Rebennack, Doc Pomus) – 3:19
5. "Bon Temps Rouler" (Rebennack, Pomus) – 4:25
6. "Something You Got" (Chris Kenner, Antoine Domino) – 2:37
7. "I Thought I Heard New Orleans Say" (Rebennack, Pomus) – 4:26
8. "Tango Palace" (Rebennack, Pomus) – 4:20
9. "Louisiana Lullabye" (Rebennack, Pomus) – 4:03

== Personnel ==
Musicians

- Dr. John – keyboards, vocals
- Abraham Laboriel – bass
- Andre Fischer – drums (track 1)
- Herman Ernest – drums (tracks 3, 5–7), percussion (tracks 4, 8–9)
- Steve Gadd – drums (tracks 4, 8–9), percussion (tracks 3, 5–7)
- Hugh McCracken – guitar
- Alvin Robinson – guitar, backing vocal (track 6)
- Fred Staehle – percussion, Wingertree
- Paulinho da Costa – percussion
- Neil Larsen – percussion
- Ronnie Barron – percussion, backing vocals
- Charlie Miller – trumpet, cornet solo (track 7)
- Oscar Brashear – trumpet, flugelhorn
- Warren Luening – trumpet, flugelhorn
- Benny Powell – trombone
- Herman Riley – baritone saxophone
- Plas Johnson – tenor saxophone, flute & clarinet
- Jackie Kelso – tenor saxophone, clarinet
- Gary Herbig – tenor saxophone solo (track 5)
- Tommy Johnson – tuba
- Larry Williams – tenor, alto saxophone, clarinet
- Kim Hutchcroft – tenor, soprano saxophone
- Harold Battiste – horn arrangements
- Petsye Powell, Tami Lynn, Brenda Russell, Jim Gilstrap, Muffy Hendricks, Denise Trammell – backing vocals

Technical

- Tommy LiPuma – producer
- Hugh McCracken – producer
- Al Schmitt – engineer
- Norm Kinney – engineer
- Don Henderson – assistant engineer
- Linda Tyler – assistant engineer
- Mike Reese – mastering
- Roland Young – art direction
- Amy Nagasawa – design
- Lou Beach – cover art
- Mark Hanauer – photography
