= 1975: The Duets =

Studio album by Dave Brubeck and Paul Desmond
- Released: 1975
- Recorded: 10 June – 16 September 1975
- Genre: Jazz
- Length: 37:34
- Label: A&M/Horizon
- Producer: John Snyder

Dave Brubeck chronology
All the Things We Are (1974)	1975: The Duets (1975)	25th Anniversary Reunion (1976)

Paul Desmond chronology
Concierto (1975)	1975: The Duets (1975)	Live (1975)

1975: The Duets is a 1975 studio album by Dave Brubeck and Paul Desmond. It was the only album the pair made that solely featured them as a duo.

== Reception ==
Professional ratings
Review scores
Source	Rating
Allmusic	4.5/5 stars

The album was reviewed by Ken Dryden at Allmusic who wrote that "Their magical ESP is evident from start to finish. Brubeck's lyricism throughout these sessions will surprise critics who label him as "bombastic," while Desmond, known for his pure dry-toned alto sax, throws a few curves to his longtime fans....the memorable interaction between the two musicians during this performance should be considered one of the high points of their respective careers. This is an essential acquisition for fans of Dave Brubeck and Paul Desmond." This album's notes recite that Brubeck and Desmond earned a transatlantic crossing playing these numbers on the ship nightly, later recording this set which likely represents eight basically then ad hoc arrangements. The album has been out-of-print for years.

== Track listing ==
1. "Alice in Wonderland" (Sammy Fain, Bob Hilliard) - 4:04
2. "These Foolish Things (Remind Me of You)" (Harry Link, Holt Marvell, Jack Strachey) - 5:09
3. "La Paloma Azul (Blue Dove)" (Traditional) - 4:34
4. "Stardust" (Hoagy Carmichael, Mitchell Parish) - 4:45
5. "Koto Song" (Dave Brubeck) - 5:56
6. "Balcony Rock" (Brubeck, Paul Desmond) - 2:16
7. "Summer Song" (Brubeck) - 3:18
8. "You Go to My Head" (J. Fred Coots, Haven Gillespie) - 7:32

== Personnel ==
- Dave Brubeck - piano, arranger
- Paul Desmond - alto saxophone, liner notes

Production

- Hollis King, Roland Young - art direction
- Dave Achelis - assistant engineer
- Harry Mittman - photography
- Stan Evenson, Isabelle Wong - design
- Elvin Campbell - engineer
- Kevin Reeves - mastering
- John Snyder - producer
- Andy Kman - production coordination
- Harry Weinger - reissue supervisor
