= Joel Shulman =

Scottish-born Canadian jazz pianist

- Shulman in 1969

Background information
- Born: 25 February 1923; Glasgow, Scotland
- Died: 12 December 1995 (aged 72) Toronto, Ontario, Canada
- Education: Guiding Eyes for the Blind
- Genre: Jazz
- Occupation: Pianist
- Spouse: Joan Warner (m. 1949)

Joel Shulman (25 February 1923 – 12 December 1995) was a Scottish-Canadian jazz pianist.

== Life and career ==
Shulman was born in Glasgow. At the age of two, he became blind. He performed in vaudeville for eight years, and emigrated to the United States in 1955. He attended Guiding Eyes for the Blind, a non-profit school in Yorktown Heights, New York. According to the Sarasota Journal, in 1969, his dog Bessie was killed by a subway train.

In 1971, Shulman released the album Peninah, and in 1972, he emigrated to Canada, settling in Toronto, Ontario. In 1976, he released the album Nowhere But Here, for which he was nominated for a Juno Award in the category Best Jazz Album. According to The Toronto Star, in 1977, jazz musician Don Thompson described Shulman as "one of his favorite people and players".

== Personal life and death ==
In 1949, Shulman married Joel Warner. Their marriage lasted until Shulman's death in 1995.

Shulman died from cancer in Toronto, Ontario on 12 December 1995, at the age of 72.
