= Jim Hall Live! =

Live album by Jim Hall
- Released: 1975
- Recorded: June 1975
- Venue: Bourbon Street, Toronto, Canada
- Genre: Jazz
- Length: 41:29
- Label: A&M/Horizon; SP-705
- Producer: John Snyder

Jim Hall chronology
Concierto (1975)	Jim Hall Live! (1975)	Commitment (1976)

Jim Hall Live! is a live album by guitarist Jim Hall recorded in 1975 at the Bourbon Street jazz club in Toronto, Canada and released on the Horizon label.

== Reception ==
Professional ratings
Review scores
Source	Rating
Allmusic	4/5 stars
The Penguin Guide to Jazz Recordings	3/4 stars

Allmusic awarded the album 4 stars with the review by Scott Yanow stating "The interplay between the three players is sometimes wondrous, and although the five selections are all familiar standards ... Hall makes the music sound fresh and full of subtleties".

Guitarist Pat Metheny, in the liner notes to the 2012 album Live Vol. 2-4, called the album his favorite by Jim Hall. Live Vol. 2-4 features an additional three hours of live recordings from the same Bourbon Street engagement:

If I had to pick one Jim record, it would be [Jim Hall Live!]....That was the ideal band, the ideal tunes, the ideal setting. Although Jim's had great periods all through his career, there was something going on right around that time that was incredible in his abilities, even on the instrument. There's stuff that he was playing right around that era that you really can't find him playing like before or after....It's a real portrait of that band. The whole thing with Don and Terry is so special, and it always has been for Jim. He's really affected by who he's playing with. Don is such a good soloist. You get to hear Jim comp a lot, which is great. Terry really understands how to play with guitar. That's something that is lost on a lot of drummers. It's not the same as playing with a tenor player. It's not the same as playing in a piano trio. Terry's always been great at that.

== Track listing ==
1. "Angel Eyes" (Matt Dennis, Earl Brent) - 11:10
2. "'Round Midnight" (Thelonious Monk, Cootie Williams, Bernie Hanighen) - 8:02
3. "Scrapple from the Apple" (Charlie Parker) - 7:37
4. "The Way You Look Tonight" (Jerome Kern, Dorothy Fields) - 6:14
5. "I Hear a Rhapsody" (George Fragos, Jack Baker, Dick Gasparre) - 8:40

== Personnel ==
- Jim Hall — guitar
- Don Thompson — bass
- Terry Clarke — drums
