= Like Someone in Love (disambiguation) =

"Like Someone in Love" is a popular song composed in 1944 by Jimmy Van Heusen, with lyrics by Johnny Burke

Like Someone in Love may also refer to:

- Like Someone in Love (Ella Fitzgerald album), 1957
- Like Someone in Love (Art Blakey album), a 1960 album recorded by Art Blakey's Jazz Messengers
- Like Someone in Love (Horace Parlan album), 1983
- Like Someone in Love (Paul Desmond album), 1992
- Like Someone in Love, a 2000 album recorded by Renato D'Aiello
- Like Someone in Love (film), a 2012 Japanese-language film by Abbas Kiarostami
