= Quintet (TV program) =

Canadian music variety show

- Genre: Variety
- Country of origin: Canada
- Original language: English
- No. of seasons: 1

Production
- Producer: Neil Sutherland
- Production location: Vancouver
- Running time: 30 minutes

Original release
- Network: CBC Television
- Release: 5 January – 29 June 1962

Quintet is a Canadian music variety show that aired on CBC Television in 1962.

== Premise ==
Various music styles from folk, blues, pop, theatrical songs and world music were featured in this program. The show featured Eleanor Collins, Bud Spencer and the Chris Gage Trio.

== Scheduling ==
This half-hour programwas broadcast Fridays at 3:00 p.m. from 5 January to 29 June 1962.
