= Live at the Café Carlyle =

Live album by George Shearing
- Released: 1984
- Recorded: January 1984 at the Café Carlyle, New York City
- Genre: Jazz
- Length: 42:35
- Label: Concord CJ 246
- Producer: Carl Jefferson

George Shearing chronology
Top Drawer (1984)	Live at the Café Carlyle (1984)	An Elegant Evening (1984)

Live at the Café Carlyle is a 1984 live album by jazz pianist George Shearing accompanied by the double bassist and pianist Don Thompson.

== Reception ==
Professional ratings
Review scores
Source	Rating
Allmusic	4/5 stars

Scott Yanow reviewed the album for Allmusic and wrote that "[Don] Thompson, who plays second piano on Herbie Hancock's "Tell Me a Bedtime Story," jams with strong intuition and consistent swing, easily picking up on Shearing's musical directions during such songs as "Pent up House," "The Shadow of Your Smile," "Cheryl" and a couple of originals", and concludes by writing that Shearing "...had his career rejuvenated during his years on Concord through stimulating musical encounters such as this one. Fine music".

== Track listing ==
1. "Pent Up House" (Sonny Rollins) – 4:13
2. "The Shadow of Your Smile" (Johnny Mandel, Paul Francis Webster) – 5:07
3. "Teach Me Tonight" (Gene De Paul, Sammy Cahn) – 3:42
4. "Cheryl" (Charlie Parker) – 4:55
5. "Blues for Breakfast" (Jerry Gladstone, Matt Dennis) – 3:38
6. "P.S. I Love You" (Gordon Jenkins, Johnny Mercer) – 2:47
7. "I Cover the Waterfront" (Edward Heyman, Johnny Green) – 5:24
8. "Tell Me a Bedtime Story" (Herbie Hancock) – 4:20
9. "Inside" (Jack Reardon, Marvin Fisher) – 4:57
10. "Stratford Stomp" (Don Thompson) – 3:32

== Personnel ==
- George Shearing – piano, vocals, liner notes
- Don Thompson – double bass, piano, liner notes

Production

- Ed Trabanco – recording engineer
- Phil Edwards – remix engineer
- Elliott Gerber – art direction
- Carl Jefferson – producer
- George Horn – mastering
- Ken Howard – photography
