= Boy from New York City and Other Hits =

Compilation album by The Manhattan Transfer
- Released: July 1997
- Genre: Vocal jazz
- Label: Flashback

The Manhattan Transfer chronology
Swing (1997)	Boy from New York City and Other Hits (1997)	The Spirit of St. Louis (2000)

Boy from New York City and Other Hits is a budget compilation album released by The Manhattan Transfer in 1997 on the Flashback Records label. This album was released as part of a series of compilations of original artist recordings at a reduced price.

"The Boy from New York City" was sung by The Ad Libs in 1964 and also by Darts in 1978 before becoming a hit for the Manhattan Transfer in 1981.

== Track listing ==
1. "The Boy from New York City" (George Davis, John Taylor) (3:40)
2. "Java Jive" (Ben Oakland, Milton Drake) (2:46)
3. "Gloria" (Leon René) (2:58)
4. "Helpless" (Lamont Dozier, Brian Holland, Eddie Holland) (3:07)
5. "Tuxedo Junction" (Erskine Hawkins, William Johnson, Buddy Feyne, Julian Dash) (3:04)
6. "Twilight Zone/Twilight Tone" (Bernard Herrmann, Jay Graydon, Alan Paul) (6:06)
7. "Ray's Rockhouse" (Ray Charles, Jon Hendricks) (5:08)
8. "Mystery" (Rod Temperton) (5:00)
9. "Smile Again" (Bill Champlin, David Foster, Jay Graydon, Alan Paul) (4:33)
10. "Birdland" (Joe Zawinul, Jon Hendricks) (6:01)
