= Closeness (album) =

Studio album by Charlie Haden
- Released: 1976
- Recorded: January 26 and March 18 & 21, 1976
- Studios: Kendun (Burbank, California); Generation (New York City)
- Genre: Jazz
- Length: 39:08
- Label: Horizon
- Producer: Ed Michel

Charlie Haden chronology
Liberation Music Orchestra (1970)	Closeness (1976)	The Golden Number (1977)

Closeness is an album of four duets by the American jazz bassist Charlie Haden, recorded in 1976 and released on the Horizon label that year. It was the first of Haden's two duet releases on Horizon, the second being The Golden Number (1977). Haden’s duet partners are pianist Keith Jarrett, alto saxophonist Ornette Coleman, harpist Alice Coltrane, and drummer Paul Motian.

== Reception ==
The AllMusic review by Scott Yanow stated, "Recommended, particularly due to the Ornette and Jarrett collaborations".

Professional ratings
Review scores
Source	Rating
AllMusic	4.5/5 stars
The Penguin Guide to Jazz	3/4 stars
The Rolling Stone Jazz Record Guide	5/5 stars

== Track listing ==
All compositions by Charlie Haden

1. "Ellen David" - 9:11
2. "O.C." - 9:31
3. "For Turiya" - 12:26
4. "For a Free Portugal" - 7:55

== Personnel ==
- Charlie Haden — double bass
- Ornette Coleman — alto saxophone (track 2)
- Keith Jarrett — piano (track 1)
- Alice Coltrane — harp (track 3)
- Paul Motian — percussion (track 4)
