= Horizon Records =

American record label

- Founded: 1962
- Founder: Dave Hubert
- Defunct: 1980
- Status: Inactive
- Distributor(s): Verve Records
- Genre: Jazz, folk
- Country of origin: U.S.

Horizon Records was an American independent record label founded in 1962 by Dave Hubert.

Horizon was originally a folk and blues label distributed by World Pacific Records. When Liberty Records acquired World Pacific in 1965, it also took over the distribution of Horizon. From 1974 to 1978 the label became a subsidiary imprint of A&M Records for issuing jazz. and pop, During this period, the label was known for producing albums with high-quality audio and packaging. The catalogue includes albums by Dave Brubeck, Ornette Coleman, Paul Desmond, Charlie Haden, and Jim Hall. John Snyder, the founder of the label, left in 1977 and started Artists House.

In 1979 Horizon struck gold with debut albums by Brenda Russell and the Yellow Magic Orchestra. By 1980, the label disappeared. In 1984, A&M went into a deal with Word Distribution, giving more powerful distribution for Word's labels, such as Myrrh Records, Word Records, and Exit Records. Horizon was reactivated with its 1979 artwork intact as a Christian label, with the Imperials, while Myrrh artist Amy Grant signed directly with A&M. By 1987, Horizon had disappeared a second time. Horizon's jazz catalogue is now managed by Verve Records.

== Discography ==
=== 1970s incarnation ===
Horizon	A&M	Artist	Album
1	701	Thad Jones and Mel Lewis	Suite for Pops
2	702	David Liebman	Sweet Hands
3	703	Dave Brubeck and Paul Desmond	1975: The Duets
4	704	Sonny Fortune	Awakening
5	705	Jim Hall	Jim Hall Live!
6	706	Ira Sullivan	Ira Sullivan
7	707	Thad Jones / Mel Lewis Orchestra	New Life
8	708	Revolutionary Ensemble	The People's Republic
9	709	Dave Liebman and Richie Beirach	Forgotten Fantasies
10	850	Paul Desmond Quartet	Live
11	710	Charlie Haden	Closeness
12	711	Sonny Fortune	Waves of Dreams
13	712	Jimmy Owens	Jimmy Owens
14	713	Karma	Celebration
15	714	Dave Brubeck	25th Anniversary Reunion
16	715	Jim Hall	Commitment
17	716	Mel Lewis	Mel Lewis and Friends
18	717	Don Cherry	Brown Rice
19	719	Gerry Niewood	And Timepiece
20	721	David Liebman	Light'n Up, Please!
21	722	Ornette Coleman	Dancing in Your Head
22	723	Karma	For Everybody
23	724	Thad Jones / Mel Lewis Orchestra	Live in Munich
24	725	Billy Hart	Enchance
25	726	Chet Baker	You Can't Go Home Again
26	727	Charlie Haden	The Golden Number
	728	Herb Alpert and Hugh Masekela	Herb Alpert & Hugh Masekela
	729	Jimmy Owens	Headin' Home
	730	Mark-Almond	Other Peoples Rooms
	731	David Grisman	Hot Dawg
	732	Dr. John	City Lights
	733	Neil Larsen	Jungle Fever
	734	Seawind	Light the Light
	735	Richard Evans	Richard Evans
	736	Yellow Magic Orchestra	Yellow Magic Orchestra
	737	Gordon Michaels	Stargazer
	738	Neil Larsen	High Gear
	739	Brenda Russell	Brenda Russell
	740	Dr. John	Tango Palace
	741	Ben Sidran	The Cat and the Hat

== See also ==
- List of record labels
