= Skylark (Paul Desmond album) =

Studio album by Paul Desmond
- Released: 1974
- Recorded: November 27–28 and December 4, 1973
- Studios: Van Gelder Studio, Englewood Cliffs, NJ
- Genres: Cool jazz, bossa nova
- Length: 53:28; Reissue with bonus tracks
- Labels: CTI; CTI 6039
- Producer: Creed Taylor

Paul Desmond chronology
Bridge Over Troubled Water (1969)	Skylark (1974)	Pure Desmond (1974)

Skylark is an album by American jazz saxophonist Paul Desmond featuring Gábor Szabó recorded in 1973 and released on the CTI label.

== Reception ==
The Allmusic review by Richard S. Ginell awarded the album 3 stars and stated "Paul Desmond injects a bit of the 1970s into his sound, obtaining agreeable if not totally simpatico results... It's a cautious change of pace for Desmond, although the fiercer context into which he was placed doesn't really fire his imagination".

Professional ratings
Review scores
Source	Rating
Allmusic	3/5 stars
The Penguin Guide to Jazz	3/4 stars

== Track listing ==
1. "Take Ten" (Paul Desmond) - 6:08
2. "Romance de Amor" (Traditional) - 9:40
3. "Was a Sunny Day" (Paul Simon) - 4:52
4. "Music for a While" (Henry Purcell) - 6:45
5. "Skylark" (Hoagy Carmichael, Johnny Mercer) - 5:21
6. "Indian Summer" (Al Dubin, Victor Herbert) - 4:00
7. "Music for a While" [alternate take] (Purcell) - 5:56 Bonus track on CD reissue
8. "Skylark" [alternate take] (Carmichael, Mercer) - 5:39 Bonus track on CD reissue
9. "Indian Summer" [alternate take] (Dubin, Herbert) - 5:27 Bonus track on CD reissue

- Recorded at Van Gelder Studio in Englewood Cliffs, New Jersey on November 27–28 and December 4, 1973

== Personnel ==
From the original liner notes.

- Paul Desmond - alto saxophone
- Bob James - piano, electric piano
- Gene Bertoncini - guitar
- Gábor Szabó - guitar (all solos)
- Ron Carter - bass
- Jack DeJohnette - drums
- Ralph MacDonald - percussion
- George Ricci - cello
- Don Sebesky - arranger
- Rudy Van Gelder - recording engineer
