= Sackville 4005 =

Live album by Ed Bickert / Don Thompson
- Released: 1978
- Recorded: January 22, 1978
- Venue: The Garden Party
- Genre: Jazz
- Length: 40:48
- Label: Sackville Recordings
- Producer: Don Thompson

Don Thompson chronology
Country Place (1976)	Sackville 4005 (1978)	Sackville 3022 (1979)

Sackville 4005 is a jazz album by Ed Bickert and Don Thompson, which was released in 1978 by Sackville Recordings. The album was recorded in concert at the Garden Party, January 22, 1978. It won the 1980 Juno Award for Best Jazz Recording.

== Track listing ==
1. "Alone Together" - 6:08
2. "A Face Like Yours" - 5:26
3. "You Are Too Beautiful" - 6:21
4. "What Is This Thing Called Love" - 6:21
5. "Who Can I Turn To" - 7:27
6. "Walkin' My Baby Back Home" - 2:59
7. "Please Be Kind" - 6:09
