= As Long as There's Music (Charlie Haden and Hampton Hawes album) =

Studio album by Charlie Haden and Hampton Hawes
- Released: 1978
- Recorded: January 25 and August 21, 1976
- Studio: Kendun Recorders, Burbank, California (January); Village Recorders, Los Angeles, California (August)
- Genre: Jazz
- Length: 69:38 CD reissue
- Label: Artists House
- Producer: Ed Michel

Charlie Haden chronology
Soapsuds, Soapsuds (1977)	As Long as There's Music (1978)	Gitane (1979)

Hampton Hawes chronology
Hampton Hawes at the Piano (1978)	As Long as There's Music (1978)	Live at the Jazz Showcase in Chicago Volume One (1981)

As Long as There's Music is an album of duets by bassist Charlie Haden and pianist Hampton Hawes, recorded in 1976 and released on the Artists House label in 1978. The album features a mix of original compositions by Hawes and Haden and music by others. "This Is Called Love" is a contrafact based on Cole Porter's What Is This Thing Called Love?. The 1993 CD reissue added a bonus track (originally released on The Golden Number) and three alternative takes from the recording sessions.

== Reception ==
The AllMusic review by Scott Yanow stated: "This quiet and often lyrical set contains a great deal of thoughtful and subtle music by two masters".

DowBeat assigned the album 4 stars. Reviewer Jon Balleras called the release. "A haunting album filled with wonderful secret knowledge".

Professional ratings
Review scores
Source	Rating
AllMusic	4/5 stars
The Penguin Guide to Jazz	3/4 stars
The Rolling Stone Jazz Record Guide	4/5 stars
DownBeat	4/5 stars

== Track listing ==
All compositions by Charlie Haden and Hampton Hawes except where noted.

1. "Irene" (Hampton Hawes) – 7:58
2. "Rain Forest" (Hawes) – 5:34
3. "Turnaround" (Ornette Coleman) – 7:52 Bonus track on CD reissue
4. "As Long as There's Music" (Sammy Cahn, Jule Styne) – 8:11
5. "This Is Called Love" – 9:12
6. "Hello/Goodbye" – 8:05
7. "Irene" (Hawes) – 8:39 Bonus track on CD reissue
8. "Turnaround" (Coleman) – 6:35 Bonus track on CD reissue
9. "As Long as There's Music" (Cahn, Styne) – 7:32 Bonus track on CD reissue
- Recorded at Kendun Recorders in Burbank, California on January 25, 1976 (tracks 1, 6 & 7) and at Village Recorder in Los Angeles on August 21, 1976 (tracks 2–5, 8 & 9)

== Personnel ==
- Charlie Haden – bass
- Hampton Hawes – piano
