= Nancy Harrow =

American jazz singer and songwriter (born 1930)

Nancy Harrow (born October 3, 1930, New York City) is an American jazz singer and songwriter.

== Career ==
Harrow studied classical piano beginning at age seven, then decided to pursue careers in dancing and singing.

She released an album for Candid Records in 1961 (featuring Kenny Burrell, Buck Clayton, Dickie Wells, and Milt Hinton) and one for Atlantic Records in 1962 (featuring John Lewis, Dick Katz, Phil Woods, Jim Hall, Richard Davis, and Connie Kay), then left music to raise a family. She returned to music in 1975.

Since then she has worked with Katz and Woods, Clark Terry, Roland Hanna, and Bob Brookmeyer. She recorded albums based on The Lost Lady by Willa Cather and The Marble Faun by Nathaniel Hawthorne. Her album Winter Dreams, based on the life of F. Scott Fitzgerald, was used for the musical This Side of Paradise, which ran for six weeks in New York City in 2010 at the Theatre at St. Clements and in 2013 at the History Theatre in St. Paul, Minnesota. For the Last Time, a jazz musical based on The Marble Faun, ran for six weeks at the Clurman Theatre on Theatre Row in New York City in 2015.

Two of Harrow's song cycles were based on children's stories. The Adventures of Maya the Bee, based on a story by Waldemar Bonsels, ran as a puppet show in New York City for seven years, was translated into Japanese, and was performed in Japan for two years. The Cat Who Went to Heaven, based on a story by Elizabeth Coatsworth, had short runs in New York City at the Mercer Street Theater, the Asia Society, and the Harlem School of the Arts. It had eleven performances at the Kennedy Center in the spring of 2011 and was performed at the Brooklyn Academy of Music in 2014.

Harrow is the mother of Damon Krukowski, a musician with the band Galaxie 500 and the duo Damon and Naomi.

== Discography ==
=== As leader ===
- Wild Women Don't Have the Blues (Candid, 1961)
- You Never Know (Atlantic, 1962)
- Anything Goes (Audiophile, 1979)
- Two's Company (Inner City, 1984)
- You're Nearer (Tono, 1986)
- Street of Dreams (Poljazz, 1989)
- The Beatles & Other Standards (Nippon Phonogram/EmArcy, 1990)
- Secrets (Soul Note, 1991)
- Lost Lady (Soul Note, 1994)
- The Marble Faun (Harbinger, 1999)
- The Adventures of Maya the Bee (Harbinger, 2000)
- Winter Dreams: The Life and Passions of F. Scott Fitzgerald (Artists House, 2003)
- The Cat Who Went to Heaven (Artists House, 2005)
- An Intimate Evening With Nancy Harrow (Benfan, 2010)
- In the Wee Small Hours (Camerata, 2010)
- The Song Is All (Benfan, 2016)
- Partners (Benfan, 2018)
- Partners II: I Don't Know What Kind of Blues I've Got (Benfan, 2021)
- Second Thoughts (2024)

=== As guest ===
- John Lewis, The John Lewis Album for Nancy Harrow (Finesse, 1981)
