= Swing (The Manhattan Transfer album) =

Studio album with a live track by the Manhattan Transfer
- Released: June 1997
- Venues: Ryman Auditorium, Nashville, Tennessee (track 13)
- Studios: Multiple studios in US and France
- Genre: Vocal jazz
- Length: 44:55
- Label: Atlantic
- Producer: Tim Hauser

The Manhattan Transfer chronology
Man-Tora! Live in Tokyo (1996)	Swing (1997)	Boy from New York City and Other Hits (1997)

Swing is the seventeenth album released by the Manhattan Transfer in 1997 on the Atlantic Records label. This album is a collection of 1930s and 1940s swing music with the Manhattan Transfer's jazz twist. The album also features a guest appearance by Stéphane Grappelli, one of his last recordings before his death.

== Track listing ==
#	Title	Writers	Length
1	"Stomp of King Porter"	Jelly Roll Morton, Jon Hendricks	3:12
2	"Sing a Study in Brown"	Count Basie, Larry Clinton, Jon Hendricks	2:51
3	"Sing Moten's Swing"	Jon Hendricks, Buster Moten, Bennie Moten	3:36
4	"A-Tisket, A-Tasket"	Al Feldman, Ella Fitzgerald.	2:57
5	"I Know Why (And So Do You)"	Harry Warren, Mack Gordon	3:34
6	"Sing You Sinners"	Sam Coslow, W. Franke Harling	2:45
7	"Java Jive"	Ben Oakland, Milton Drake	2:51
8	"Down South Camp Meetin' "	Fletcher Henderson, Jon Hendricks, Irving Mills	3:15
9	"Topsy"	Edgar Battle, Eddie Durham	3:14
10	"Clouds (Nuages)"	Django Reinhardt, Jon Hendricks	7:12
11	"Skyliner"	Charlie Barnet	3:11
12	"It's Good Enough to Keep (Air Mail Special)"	Charlie Christian, Benny Goodman, Jimmy Mundy, Alan Paul	3:11
13	"Choo Choo Ch'Boogie" [live]	Denver Darling, Milt Gabler, Vaughn Horton	3:00

== Guest artists ==
- Sing Moten's Swing, A-Tisket, A-Tasket, and Java Jive were recorded with Asleep at the Wheel.
- Sing a Study in Brown, Topsy, and Nuages were recorded with The Rosenberg Trio. Nuages also features Stephane Grappelli.
- Ricky Skaggs is featured on Skyliner and It's Good Enough to Keep.
- Mark O'Connor is featured on I Know Why, It's Good Enough to Keep, and Choo Choo Ch' Boogie.
- Many of the tracks feature lyrics by Jon Hendricks. The re-mix engineer was Ed Cherney and the album was produced by Tim Hauser.

== Cover art ==
The cover art for Swing comes from a matchbook cover advertising "Hollywood's Jitterbug House" which was located at 875 North Vine Street in Hollywood. This venue featured Louis Prima and his band.

== Personnel ==
- Adapted from AllMusic:

The Manhattan Transfer

- Cheryl Bentyne – vocals, vocal arrangements (7)
- Tim Hauser – vocals, vocal arrangements (2, 7)
- Alan Paul – vocals, vocal arrangements (5, 7, 12)
- Janis Siegel – vocals, vocal arrangements (1, 3, 4, 6–9, 13)

Additional personnel

- Yaron Gershovsky – acoustic piano (1–9, 11–12), musical arrangements, musical director, vocal arrangements (2, 11)
- Gary Smith – acoustic piano (13)
- John Pisano – rhythm guitar (1)
- Nous'che Rosenberg – rhythm guitar (2, 9–10)
- Stochelo Rosenberg – lead guitar (2, 9–10)
- Ray Benson – guitar (3–4, 7)
- Cindy Cashdollar – steel guitar (3–4, 7)
- David Hungate – rhythm guitar (5–6, 8, 11–12), bass (13)
- Buddy Emmons – pedal steel guitar (5, 11)
- Ricky Skaggs – rhythm guitar (8, 11, 13), mandolin (11–12)
- Jack Wilkins – electric guitar (11)
- Brent Rowan – electric guitar (13)
- Steve Hinson – pedal steel guitar (13)
- Tony Dumas – bass guitar (1)
- Ray Brown – bass guitar (2, 9, 11–12)
- Tony Garnier – bass guitar (3–4, 7)
- Robert Burns – bass guitar (5–6, 8)
- Nonnie Rosenberg – bass guitar (10)
- Ralph Humphrey – drums (1), washboard (1)
- Duffy Jackson – drums (2, 8–12)
- David Sanger – drums (3–4, 7)
- Paul Leim – drums (5–6)
- John Freeman – vibraphone (11)
- Michael Francis – alto saxophone (3–4, 7)
- Chris Booher – fiddle (3–4, 7)
- Jason Roberts – fiddle (3–4, 7)
- Mark O'Connor – violin solo (5), violin (12, 13)
- Conni Ellisor – violin (5)
- Carl Gorodetzky – violin (5)
- Lee Larrison – violin (5)
- Pamela Sixfin – violin (5)
- Stéphane Grappelli – violin (10)
- Fletcher Henderson – original arrangements (1–2, 6, 8)
- Carl Marsh – string arrangements (5)
- Kurt Elling – vocal arrangements (6)
- Gene Puerling – vocal arrangements (10)
- Jack White and His All-Stars – chorus choir (4)

== Production ==
- Tim Hauser – producer
- Ray Benson – associate producer (3–4, 7)
- Jeff Levine – tracking engineer
- Emmanuel Payet – tracking engineer
- Alan Schuman – tracking engineer
- Larry Seyer – tracking engineer
- Michael Eric Hutchinson – vocal tracking
- Terry Becker – additional recording, mixing (13)
- Tom McCauley – additional recording
- Kent Bruce – assistant engineer
- Paul Dicato – assistant engineer
- Steve Lowery – assistant engineer
- Tony Rambo – assistant engineer
- Brent Reilly – assistant engineer
- Ed Cherney – mixing (1–12)
- Doug Sax – mastering
- Thomas Bricker – art direction, design
- Michael Tighe – photography
- Jack White –project coordinator, management

Studios

- Tracks 1–12 recorded at Red Zone Studios (Burbank, California); Goldmine Studio (Tarzana, California); Moving Hands Studios (Los Angeles, California); Sound Emporium (Nashville, Tennessee); Bismeaux Studios (Austin, Texas); Unique Recording Studios (New York City, New York); Studio Acousti (Paris, France).

Venue

- Track 13 recorded live at The Ryman Auditorium (Nashville, Tennessee).
- Mixed at Record Plant (Los Angeles, California) and Andora Studios (Hollywood, California).
- Mastered at The Mastering Lab (Hollywood, California).

== References / Sources ==
- The Manhattan Transfer Official Website

Specific
