= Artists House =

Jazz and blues record company

- Founded: 1977
- Founder: John Snyder
- Defunct: 2006
- Genre: Jazz, free jazz, free funk, blues, blues rock, R&B
- Country of origin: U.S.
- Location: New York City

Artists House was a jazz and blues record company and label established in 1977 by John Snyder.

== History ==
The label released music by artists that label founder John Snyder had worked with while running the Horizon subsidiary of A&M Records, including Jim Hall, Paul Desmond, Charlie Haden, and Ornette Coleman. The label was the first in North America to release an album by James Blood Ulmer. Artist House reportedly gave its recording artists control over music selection, production and packaging. In addition to working with jazz artists, Snyder also produced blues musicians including Clarence "Gatemouth" Brown, James Cotton, and Etta James, and the blues-rock Derek Trucks Band.

Snyder released new blues band Scrapomatic in 2002. Artists House also released Nancy Harrow, Oteil & The Peacemakers, Jason Crosby, Bob Brookmeyer & Kenny Wheeler, Steve Haines Quintet, Vijay Iyer albums in 2003. Artists House released Nancy Harrow CD "The Cat Who Went to Heaven" in 2005. Snyder is currently president of Artists House Foundation.

== Discography ==
Artists House released fourteen LPs between 1978 and 1981.

AH #	Leader	Album
1	Ornette Coleman	Body Meta
2	Paul Desmond	Paul Desmond
3	The Thad Jones Mel Lewis Quartet	The Thad Jones Mel Lewis Quartet
4	Charlie Haden and Hampton Hawes	As Long as There's Music
5	Jim Hall and Red Mitchell	Jim Hall/Red Mitchell
6	Ornette Coleman and Charlie Haden	Soapsuds, Soapsuds
7	James Blood Ulmer	Tales of Captain Black
8	David Liebman	Pendulum
9	Andrew Hill	From California with Love
10	Waymon Reed	46th and 8th
11	Chet Baker	Once Upon a Summertime
12	Art Pepper	So in Love
13	James Blood Ulmer	Are You Glad to Be in America?
14	Gil Evans	Where Flamingos Fly

Artists House relaunched in 2003 releasing CDs, DVDs and multimedia discs.

#	Leader	Album	Notes
AH 00001	Nancy Harrow	Winter Dreams	
AH 00002	Oteil and The Peacemakers	The Family Secret	
AH 00003	Scrapomatic	Scapomatic	CD + DVD
AH 4	Jason Crosby	Four Chords and Seven Notes Ago	Enhanced CD + DVD
AH 5	Jim Stack and Friends	Jazz for a Summer's Night	
AH006	Bob Brookmeyer and Kenny Wheeler	Island	CD + Multichannel
AH 8	Steve Haines Quintet	Beginner's Mind	
AH9	Vijay Iyer	Blood Sutra	

== See also ==
- Free jazz
- blues rock
- Scrapomatic
- Derek Trucks
