= Hampton Hawes at the Piano =

Studio album by Hampton Hawes
- Released: 1978
- Recorded: August 14, 1976
- Studios: Contemporary Records Studio, Los Angeles, CA
- Genre: Jazz
- Length: 38:50
- Label: Contemporary S7637
- Producers: Lester Koenig and John Koenig

Hampton Hawes chronology
Memory Lane Live (1977)	Hampton Hawes at the Piano (1978)	As Long as There's Music (1978)

Hampton Hawes at the Piano is an album by American jazz pianist Hampton Hawes, recorded in 1976 and released on the Contemporary label in 1978. The album was Hawes's final recording before his death in 1977 and was the first to be released posthumously.

== Reception ==
The AllMusic review by Scott Yanow noted that Hawes "was still in prime form".

Professional ratings
Review scores
Source	Rating
AllMusic	3/5 stars
The Penguin Guide to Jazz Recordings	3/4 stars
The Rolling Stone Jazz Record Guide	3/5 stars

== Track listing ==
1. "Killing Me Softly with His Song" (Charles Fox, Norman Gimbel) – 6:04
2. "Soul Sign Eight" (Hampton Hawes) – 8:11
3. "Sunny" (Bobby Hebb) – 5:00
4. "Morning" (Hawes) – 7:28
5. "Blue in Green" (Miles Davis, Bill Evans) – 5:25
6. "When I Grow Too Old to Dream" (Sigmund Romberg, Oscar Hammerstein II) – 6:42

== Personnel ==
- Hampton Hawes – piano
- Ray Brown – bass
- Shelly Manne – drums
