= Nuages =

Composition by Django Reinhardt

1940 release on the French Swing label

Sample of "Nuages"
From a 1946 recording by Django Reinhardt, Stéphane Grappelli and the Quintette du Hot Club de France

"Nuages" (French pronunciation: [nɥaʒ]) is one of the best-known compositions by Django Reinhardt. He recorded at least thirteen versions of the tune, which is a jazz standard and a mainstay of the gypsy swing repertoire. English and French lyrics have been added to the piece, which was originally an instrumental work. The title translated into English is "Clouds", but the adaptation with English lyrics is titled "It's the Bluest Kind of Blues".

In 1940, Django made two recordings of "Nuages" in F major, and with a clarinet melody. (Some later recordings are in G major, perhaps to suit the violin.) Unhappy with the first recording, Reinhardt added a second clarinet, creating a renowned arrangement for the December 1940 recording. Reinhardt's 1946 recording (as can be heard in the sample) is in the key of G major. A final recording was made at a 1953 session just before he died, where we hear Reinhardt with only Maurice Vander on piano, Pierre Michelot on bass, and Jean-Louis Viale on drums. He was using an electric guitar by this time. "Nuages" was released by Django Reinhardt and the Quintet of the Hot Club of France on the French Swing label as a 78-RPM single in 1940. The flip side is "Les Yeux Noirs".

== Other recordings ==
- Sidney Bechet – Rendez-vous avec Sidney Bechet et Andre Reweliotty (1953)
- Tony Bennett – used the music with new lyrics that he wrote for a song titled "All for You" on The Art of Romance (2004)
- Benny Carter – Elegy in Blue (1994)
- Pino Daniele – vocal version in his album – Passi d'autore (2004)
- Lucienne Delyle – vocal version of "Nuages" with French lyrics by Jacques Larue (1942)
- Denny Dennis with the Stanley Black Orchestra – vocal version "It's the Bluest Kind of Blues My Baby Sings" with English lyrics by Spencer Williams (1942)
- Paul Desmond with Ed Bickert – Pure Desmond (1974)
- Peggy Lee with Dave Barbour and His Orchestra – vocal version "It's the Bluest Kind of Blues" (1946, not issued until 2000)
- Manhattan Transfer – on their album Swing (1997) – "Clouds" – with vocal arrangement by Gene Puerling and vocalese lyrics by Jon Hendricks – guest appearances by the Rosenberg Trio and Stéphane Grappelli (a founding member of Django's Quintette du Hot Club de France—one of Grappelli's last recordings)
- Zlatko Manojlović – Zlatko i njegove gitare (1980)
