= A Beautiful Friendship (album) =

Studio album by Don Thompson Quartet
- Released: 1984
- Genre: Jazz
- Length: 46:27
- Label: Concord Jazz

Don Thompson chronology
Live at the Cafe Carlyle (1984)	A Beautiful Friendship (1984)	Witchcraft (1986)

A Beautiful Friendship is a jazz album by the Don Thompson Quartet, which was released in 1984 by Concord Jazz. It won the 1985 Juno Award for Best Jazz Album.
