= Like Someone in Love (Paul Desmond album) =

Live album by Paul Desmond
- Released: 1992
- Recorded: March 29, 1975
- Venue: Bourbon Street, Toronto, Canada
- Genre: Jazz
- Length: 60:19
- Label: Telarc; CD-83319
- Producer: John Snyder

Paul Desmond chronology
Paul Desmond (1978)	Like Someone in Love (1992)

Like Someone in Love is a live album by saxophonist Paul Desmond recorded in 1975 at the Bourbon Street jazz club in Toronto, Canada but not released by the Telarc label until 1992. The album's tracks were remixed and re-released in 2020 as part of the Mosaic Records boxed set The Complete 1975 Toronto Recordings.

== Reception ==
Professional ratings
Review scores
Source	Rating
Allmusic	4/5 stars
The Penguin Guide to Jazz Recordings	3/4 stars

Allmusic reviewer by Richard S. Ginell said "Recorded live in Toronto's Bourbon Street Jazz Club several months before the live dates released on Horizon and Artists House, it finds Desmond growing comfortable with his new Toronto friends but not quite settled into their laid-back ways quite yet. ... Desmond seems to produce his best work in the material that he seems most familiar with... The boxy, confined live sound doesn't suit the late saxophonist but every precious unreleased note from Desmond is definitely worth sampling at whatever sonic level".

== Track listing ==
1. "Just Squeeze Me (But Don't Tease Me)" (Duke Ellington, Lee Gaines) − 8:35
2. "Tangerine" (Victor Schertzinger, Johnny Mercer) − 9:39
3. "Meditation" (Antônio Carlos Jobim, Newton Mendonça, Norman Gimbel) − 10:52
4. "Nuages" (Django Reinhardt) − 10:30
5. "Like Someone in Love" (Jimmy Van Heusen, Johnny Burke) − 9:44
6. "Things Ain't What They Used to Be" (Mercer Ellington, Ted Persons) − 10:59

== Personnel ==
- Paul Desmond − alto saxophone
- Ed Bickert − guitar
- Don Thompson − bass
- Jerry Fuller − drums
