= Hollywood Be Thy Name =

Live album by Dr. John
- Released: October 6, 1975
- Recorded: 1975
- Studios: Cherokee (Hollywood, California)
- Genres: New Orleans R&B; R&B; funk
- Length: 40:45
- Label: United Artists
- Producer: Bob Ezrin

Dr. John chronology
Desitively Bonnaroo (1974)	Hollywood Be Thy Name (1975)	City Lights (1978)

Professional ratings
Review scores
Source	Rating
AllMusic	2.5/5 stars
Christgau's Record Guide	C−

Hollywood Be Thy Name is a live album by the New Orleans R&B artist Dr. John. It was produced by Bob Ezrin. The notional recording venue, "Willie Purple's Niteclub", was actually Cherokee Studios with a live audience.

== Background ==
After leaving Atco Records, where he had been signed for many years, Dr. John moved to United Artists Records and released this album there. According to the album's credits, the record combines live recordings made at the "Willie Purple's Nightclub" with recordings made at Cherokee Recording Studio. However, it has also been suggested that the album is actually a pseudo-live record, with producer Bob Ezrin overdubbing audience reactions onto studio recordings. Tommy Bolin, who had recently moved to Los Angeles at the time, also participated in the sessions for the album, but his playing was ultimately not included and was replaced by that of other guitarists.

== Track listing ==
All tracks are written by Dr. John; except where indicated.

No.	Title	Writer(s)	Length
1.	"New Island Soiree"		3:13
2.	"Reggae Doctor"		3:19
3.	"The Way You Do the Things You Do"	William Robinson, Robert Rogers	3:46
4.	"Swanee River Boogie"	Stephen Foster	2:51
5.	"Yesterday"	John Lennon, Paul McCartney	5:21
6.	"Babylon"	Bob Ezrin, Dr. John	6:11
7.	"Back by the River"	Bill Quateman	4:01
8.	"Medley: It's All Right with Me Blue Skies Will the Circle Be Unbroken"	Cole Porter; Irving Berlin; A. P. Carter, Ada R. Habershon, Charles H. Gabriel	5:32
9.	"Hollywood Be Thy Name"		3:16
10.	"I Wanna Rock"	Roy Montrell, John Marascalco, Bumps Blackwell	3:15

== Personnel ==
Musicians

- Dr. John – vocals, keyboards
- Ronnie Barron – keyboards, vocals on "Will the Circle Be Broken"
- Kenny Ascher – keyboards
- Bob Ezrin – vocals, keyboards, arrangements
- Steve Hunter – guitar
- Alvin Robinson – guitar, vocals on "It's All Right with Me"
- James Herb Smith – guitar
- Tommy Bolin – guitar
- Julius Farmer – bass, horn arrangements
- Johnny Badanjek – drums
- John Boudreaux – drums
- Tommy Vig – percussion
- Clifford Solomon – tenor saxophone
- Ernie Watts – tenor saxophone
- Leroy Cooper – baritone saxophone
- Warren Luening – trumpet
- Chauncey Welsch – trombone
- Fred Wesley – horn arrangements
- Bobby Torres – conductor

The Creolettes

- Venetta Fields – backing vocals
- Robbie Montgomery – backing vocals
- Tami Lynn – backing vocals

Technical

- Bob Ezrin – producer, engineer
- Bruce Robb, Colonel Tubby, David Hines, Dee Robb, George Tutko – assistant engineers
- Jim Frank – mixing engineer
- Bob Cato – art direction, design
- Doug Metzler – artwork, photography
- Paul Ruscha – photography
