= Bill King (musician) =

- Born: William Morgan King; 22 June 1946 (age 80); Jeffersonville, Indiana, USA
- Labels: Capitol Records, Change Records, Freedom Records Inc., Night Passage Records, Gimesushi Productions Inc., Entertainment Management Corporation, Gala Records
- Formerly of: The Hawks, The Chateaus, Kozmic Blues Band, Homestead, China, The Barking Boys, Rhythm Express, Bill King Quintet, The Bill King Quartet, The Bill King Trio

Bill King is a Canadian musician who has worked with a wide range of artists since the 1960s. He has also had charting records under his own name.

== Background ==
King has been a musical director for artists that include Janis Joplin, Linda Ronstadt, the Pointer Sisters, Martha Reeves and Craig Russell. He has also worked with Paupers, Luke & The Apostles, Martha Reeves and Herbie Hancock. He has also been nominated three times for a Juno Award.

== Career ==
King's album Goodbye Superdad debuted at No. 95 on the RPM 100 albums chart for the week of 14 July 1973.

King wrote, produced and recorded "Love and Affection". Backed with his comopostition, "Summer Heat (Symphonic Reggae)", it was released on Change CH 45027 in 1980. The record debuted at No. 42 on the RPM Adult Oriented Playlist and the for the week of 26 April 1980. It peaked at No. 77 on the RPM Top Singles (51–100) chart for the week of 24 May. At week nine, it peaked at No. 22 on the Adult Oriented Playlist chart.

King was appearing at the El Mocambo club from 5 May until 10 May 1980.

Lorraine Scott and King recorded the song, "All Alone in Love". Backed with "Angelina" by the Bill King Quintet, it was released as a single on Night Passage Records in 1985.

In 2020, King's album Mondo Jumbo was released. It was described by Maple Blues as a mix of Soul, Funk and Rhythm & Blues.
