= The Golden Number =

Studio album by Charlie Haden
- Released: 1977
- Recorded: June 7, August 21 and December 19 & 20, 1976
- Genre: Jazz
- Length: 52:01
- Label: Horizon
- Producer: Ed Michel

Charlie Haden chronology
Closeness (1976)	The Golden Number (1977)	Soapsuds, Soapsuds (1977)

The Golden Number is an album of four duets by bassist Charlie Haden recorded in 1976 and released on the Horizon label in 1977. It was the second of Haden's two duet releases on Horizon, the previous being Closeness (1976). Haden’s duet partners are trumpeter Don Cherry (also playing flute), tenor saxophonist Archie Shepp, pianist Hampton Hawes and alto saxophonist Ornette Coleman (here playing trumpet). Hawes died shortly before the album’s release, and Haden dedicated the work to him in the liner notes.

== Reception ==
Professional ratings
Review scores
Source	Rating
AllMusic	4/5 stars
DownBeat	5/5 stars
The Encyclopedia of Popular Music	2/5 stars
The Penguin Guide to Jazz	3.5/4 stars
The Rolling Stone Jazz Record Guide	4/5 stars
Tom Hull – on the Web	B+
The Virgin Encyclopedia of Jazz	2/5 stars

The editors of AllMusic awarded the album 4 stars, and Scott Yanow's review states: "In general, the music is quite intriguing and has its share of variety."

Pianist and composer Ethan Iverson called the album "essential," and singled out "Turnaround" for praise, writing: "Hawes is with Haden every second, reacting to those outer-space notes with faultless choices and never with too much left hand. There's even something Ornette-ish about a few of Hawes's phrases, and the last 'heraldic' stuff is pure Don Cherry."

== Track listing ==
All compositions by Charlie Haden except as indicated

1. "Out of Focus" - 7:27
2. "Shepp's Way" - 12:07
3. "Turnaround" (Ornette Coleman) - 7:52
4. "Golden Number" - 12:28

- Recorded at Kendun Recorders in Burbank, California, on June 7, 1976, (track 1), at Village Recorder in Los Angeles on August 21, 1976, (track 3) and at Generation Sound in New York City on December 19 (track 4) and December 20 (track 2), 1976.

== Personnel ==
- Charlie Haden — double bass
- Don Cherry — pocket trumpet, flute (track 1)
- Archie Shepp — tenor saxophone (track 2)
- Hampton Hawes — piano (track 3)
- Ornette Coleman — trumpet (track 4)
