= Dave Robbins (trombonist) =

American–Canadian trombonist and composer (1923–2005)

- Born: August 14, 1923; Greensburg, Indiana, U.S.
- Died: 2005 (aged 81–82) Gibsons, British Columbia, Canada
- Genres: Jazz, big band
- Instrument: Trombone
- Years active: 1948–2005

David Thornburg Robbins (August 14, 1923 – September 23, 2005) was an American–Canadian trombonist, composer, arranger, and teacher.

== Early life and education ==
Born in Greensburg, Indiana, Robbins studied music education at Sam Houston State University and the University of Southern California.

== Career ==
Robbins served in United States Marine Corps and was a sergeant stationed at the Marine Corps Base in San Diego, California, where he was on the Halls of Montezuma broadcast. When he was discharged, he worked as a trombonist in symphony orchestras and in Harry James' band (1948–1954). He moved to Vancouver in 1951 and became a Canadian citizen in 1965.

From 1955 to 1970, Robbins was the principal trombonist with the Vancouver Symphony Orchestra and performed with other local orchestras. He organized and led show bands featured in Vancouver nightclubs, and led some of city's most popular big bands. In the 1960s, his big band was featured regularly on national radio programs. His original compositions included Jazz Impressions of the Middle East (1967).

Robbins taught young musicians at Vancouver Community College and the University of British Columbia. His students included Herb Besson, Hugh Fraser, R&B saxophonist Gordie Bertram of the Powder Blues Band, and New Orleans–based saxophonist and jazz educator John Doheny.
