= Sonny Greenwich =

Canadian guitarist

- Born: Herbert Lawrence Greenidge; January 1, 1936 (age 90); Hamilton, Ontario, Canada
- Genres: Avant-garde jazz
- Occupation: Musician
- Instrument: Guitar
- Labels: Justin Time, Sackville, Kleo, Cornerstone, PM Records

Sonny Greenwich, CM (born January 1, 1936) is a Canadian guitarist. He has played in major Canadian and American cities including a concert at Carnegie Hall. He has performed with musicians such as Charles Lloyd, Wayne Shorter, Pharoah Sanders, McCoy Tyner, Chick Corea, John Handy and Sun Ra.

== Biography ==
Born in Hamilton, Ontario, Sonny Greenwich first drew notice for his style in 1959 in Toronto, Ontario. In 1965 he performed in New York City at The Village Gate with saxophonist Charles Lloyd. Greenwich's reputation, grew by word of mouth, bringing him to the attention of John Handy, with whom he played from December 1966 through March 1967 in Vancouver, Seattle, San Francisco and New York playing with another Canadian, bassist Don Thompson. Columbia Records released their concert appearance as Spirituals to Swing. It was also at this time that Greenwich recorded the album Third Season, with well-known saxophonist, Hank Mobley, on Blue Note Records.

The New Grove Dictionary of Jazz states that "Some critics regard Greenwich as the most important Canadian jazzman". He is listed as one of the '10 Best Canadian Jazz Musicians of All Time' in the Canadian Book of Lists, and in The History of the guitar in jazz Barney Kessel writes, "There is a deep emotion and sincerity in Sonny's music ... and I consider him a really rare kind of talent". Greenwich's prominence has him written up in the Canadian Encyclopedia; and the Jazz in Canada. Michael Bloomfield listed Sonny Greenwich as one of his favorite jazz guitarists in the August 1971 issue of Guitar Player magazine stating, "There's a guy named Sonny Greenwich, from Canada, he's a phenomenon. They talk about John McLaughlin, but dig this Sonny cat, he's the Coltrane of guitar players."

In 1968, Sonny Greenwich led his own quartet, of pianist Teddy Saunders, bassist Jimmy Garrison and drummer Jack DeJohnette at the Village Vanguard in New York. In December 1969 Greenwich performed with Miles Davis, Wayne Shorter, Chick Corea, Dave Holland and Tony Williams at the Colonial Tavern in Toronto. The following year, Greenwich's own group opened for the Miles Davis band at Massey Hall.

In 2006, he was made a Member of the Order of Canada. In 2021, he received the Canadian Jazz Master Award.

In 2020, Canadian jazz critic Mark Miller published a book-length biography of Greenwich entitled, Of Stars and Strings: A Biography of Sonny Greenwich.

== Personal life ==
He is the father of Sonny Greenwich Jr., guitarist of the Canadian funk-metal band Bootsauce.

== Discography ==
- The Old Man and the Child (CBC/Sackville, 1970)
- Love Song for a Virgo Lady (CBC/Sackville, 1970)
- Sun Song Akasha, (CBC, 1974)
- Evolution, Love's Reverse (PM, 1979)
- Days Gone By (Sackville, 1979) with Ed Bickert
- Bird of Paradise (Justin Time, 1986)
- Live at Sweet Basil (Justin Time, 1987)
- Standard Idioms (Kleo, 1991/92)
- Outside In (Justin Time, 1994) with Paul Bley
- Hymn to the Earth (Kleo, 1994)
- Welcome: Mother Earth (Justin Time, 1995)
- Spirit in the Air (Kleo, 1995)
- Kenny & Sonny Live at the Montreal Bistro (Justin Time, 1997) (as the Kenny Wheeler & Sonny Greenwich Quintet)
- Fragments of a Memory, (Cornerstone, 2001)
- Special Angel (CBC, 2003) with Marilyn Lerner
- Essence (Kleo, 2009)
- Portraits (Kleo, 2009)

== As a Sideman ==
- Lee Gagnon, Jazzzzz (Radio Canada International, 1969)
- Moe Koffman, Solar Explorations (GRT, 1974)
- Hank Mobley, Third Season (Blue Note, 1980)
- Hilario Duran, Francisco's Song (Justin Time, 1996)
- Barry Elmes, Different Voices (Cornerstone, 1997)
