= John Doheny =

Jazz tenor saxophonist and bandleader (born 1953)

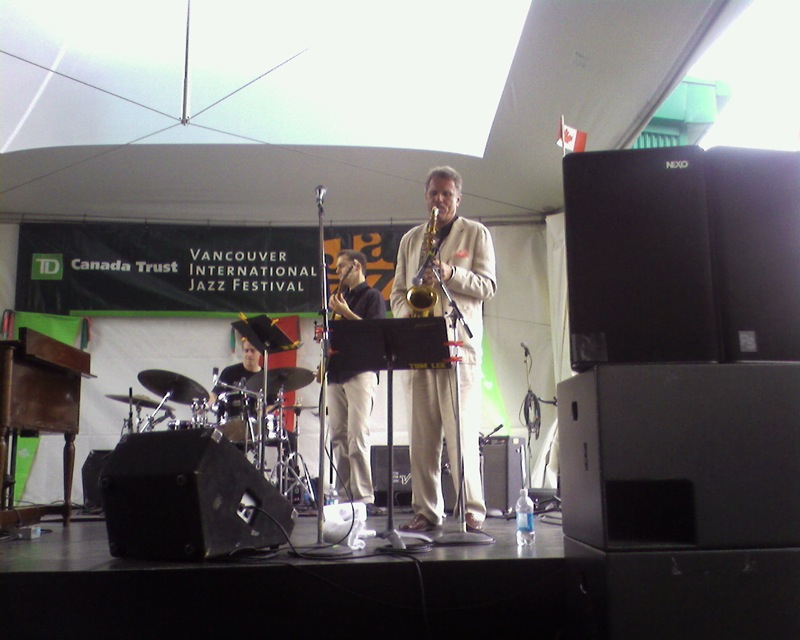
- John Doheny at the Vancouver Jazz Festival '07. Photo by Raquel Dennett

Background information
- Born: December 17, 1953 (age 72); Seattle, Washington, United States
- Genres: Jazz
- Instruments: Saxophones, Flute, Clarinet

John Steven "Pip" Doheny (born 17 December 1953) is a jazz tenor saxophonist and bandleader.

Born in Seattle, Washington, Doheny studied with Canadian saxophonist and bandleader Fraser MacPherson, whom he credits as a major influence. He spent his early career in the 1970s primarily in Vancouver, British Columbia, Canada, playing in local rhythm and blues bands and strip clubs, as well as spending large parts of each year on road trips to taverns throughout rural British Columbia and Alberta. By the late 1970s and into the mid 1980s he was appearing as a sideman with artists such as Albert Collins, Doug and the Slugs, the Coasters, the Platters, the Temptations, and Buddy Knox. In the late 1980s he relocated to Toronto, Ontario, Canada, and then New York City, working with the bands of Lloyd Williams, Solomon Burke, Danny B, and Kenny Margolis. The 1990s saw Doheny touring and studio work, both with jazz ensembles and pop groups, including Bell Biv Devoe.

He released his first CD as a leader, One Up, Two Back, in 2002, featuring his band the John Doheny Quintet, and vocalist Colleen Savage. In 2003 he moved to New Orleans to pursue a master's degree in jazz history at Tulane University. Doheny also plays flute, clarinet, and alto saxophone.

Doheny is a jazz historian, holding an MA in Jazz History from Tulane University, as well as a bachelor's in music and a bachelor's in education from the University of British Columbia in Vancouver, Canada. He has written articles on Jelly Roll Morton and published in Tulane's Jazz Archivist. He has transcribed the music of Charles Mingus from audio form into written musical scores. These scores were adapted to a series of performances, Mingus Mania, parts of which appeared on the Bravo television network in the early 1990s as musical interludes. Doheny also composed and performed source music for the soundtrack for the 1998 Bruce Sweeney film Dirty, as well as appearing with his band in the 1997 Brian Dennehy TV movie A Father's Betrayal.

Doheny lives in New Orleans, Louisiana, and is an advocate for the rebuilding of New Orleans to its original form, history, and traditions.

== Discography ==
=== As leader ===
The Real Cool Killers: Parades and Saints-Independent − 2010

Personnel:

- John Doheny (tenor saxophone)
- Geoff Clapp (drums)
- Rob Kohler (bass)

Track list:

- Parades and Saints
- In the Hive
- Cuts and Courts
- 1963
- The Split
- For Booker Ervin
- The Matrix is Not Real
- Brother Brown
- Cissy Takes a Train
- Slightly Stella
- Rhythm-a-ning

John Doheny presents The Professors of Pleasure, Volume Two-Independent − 2010

Personnel:

- John Doheny (tenor and soprano saxophone)
- Jim Markway (acoustic and electric bass)
- Geoff Clapp (drums)−
- Jesse McBride (acoustic and electric piano)
- John Dobry (electric guitar)
- Allen L. Dejan Jr. (alto, tenor and soprano saxophone)
- Andrew Baham (trumpet)

Track List:

- Don't Know About That
- Child Playing
- Half Nelson
- Nancy with the Laughing Face
- Funky B
- Beautiful Old Ladies
- Elysian Fields
- Cautious Optimism
- This I Dig of You
- Tulane Fight Song

John Doheny and The Professors of Pleasure: Tulane University Faculty Quintet − Independent 2007

Personnel:

- John Doheny (tenor and alto saxophone)
- Fredrick Sanders (piano, Fender Rhodes electric piano, Hammond B-3 organ)
- John Dobry (guitar)
- Jim Markway (electric and acoustic bass)
- Kevin O'Day (drums)

Track List:

- Jackson Square
- Padrino
- Cottontail
- Your Majesty
- The Rainbow People
- A Greasy One
- Halifax
- Big G's Love

One Up, Two Back - JDQ Records CD618551 − 2002

Personnel:

- John Doheny (tenor sax)
- Norm Quinn (trumpet and flugelhorn)
- Ridley Vinson or Tony Foster (piano)
- Al Johnston (bass)
- Stan Taylor (drums)
- Colleen Savage (vocals)

Track List:

- One Up, Two Back
- We Knew
- Attack of the Killer Chalmations
- Player's Inn
- Dindi
- Killer Chalmations . . Slight Return
- Time After Time
- Once in a While
- Perdido

=== Appears on the following recordings ===
- Algiers-Colleen Savage-Savage Records (2011)
- Hot Air Volume 3. CBC Radio Compilation. CBC Records. HACD0052 (2002)
- Martin Ferr - Dubious - Independent Cassette - 001 (1995)
- Bell Biv Devoe - Poison (Bell Biv DeVoe album) - MCA Records (1990)
- Terraced Garden - Within - Melody And Menace Records LP - CT - 1960 (1988)
- Downtown Kenny Brown and the Pervaders - Willin' and Ready - Razor Records/Blue Wave Records LP - 017 (1982)
- Albert Collins - When The Welfare Turns Its Back On You - Sonnet Records - LP - 14107 (1979)
- Douglas College Night Band - It's Just Talk-CD- DC 1007 (1998)
- VCC Jazz Orchestra - Revelation-Cassette (1995)
- VCC Jazz Orchestra - Let Me Off Uptown-Cassette (1993)

Original compositions, "If I Only Had A Brain" and "Uncle Jim's Blues", to the soundtrack of the 1998 Bruce Sweeney film Dirty.
