= Ed Bickert =

Canadian jazz guitarist (1932–2019)

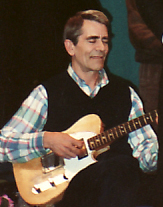
- Bickert in 1989

Background information
- Born: Edward Isaac Bickert; November 29, 1932; Hochfeld, Manitoba, Canada
- Died: February 28, 2019 (aged 86) Toronto, Ontario, Canada
- Genre: Jazz
- Occupation: Musician
- Instrument: Guitar
- Labels: Sackville, Concord Jazz, PM, Unisson, Cornerstone

Edward Isaac Bickert, CM (November 29, 1932 – February 28, 2019) was a Canadian guitarist who played mainstream jazz and swing music. Bickert worked professionally from the mid-1950s to 2000, mainly in the Toronto area. His international reputation grew steadily from the mid-1970s onward as he recorded albums both as a bandleader and as a backing musician for Paul Desmond, Rosemary Clooney, and other artists, with whom he toured in North America, Europe and Japan.

== Early life ==
Bickert was born in the small village of Hochfeld, Manitoba, a Plautdietsch-speaking community of Mennonites. His parents were Harry Bickert, a Russian Mennonite immigrant from Molotschna colony, and Helen Dyck of Plum Coulee, Manitoba. Bickert's parents were semi-professional musicians: his father played fiddle and his mother played piano.

As a child, Bickert and his family moved to Vernon, British Columbia where his parents operated a chicken farm and had a small country dance band. When he was ten years old, Bickert started playing a guitar owned by his older brother, and he was soon performing at country dances with his parents. In his late teens, Bickert worked for a little over a year as a sound engineer at a local radio station near Vernon. In 1952, Bickert decided to move to Toronto with the thought of pursuing music as a career. Once in Toronto, he again took a job as a sound engineer at radio station CFRB to support himself. Bickert said of this period "I was really taken aback by the guitar players I heard [in Toronto]. I thought, 'Well, I'm not ready for this!' So I didn't play at all for a couple of years. I worked at CFRB as an engineer, and while I was doing that I gradually got a little fired up about music, met some musicians, played some sessions..."

== Music career ==
=== Breaking into the Toronto jazz scene (1952–1957) ===
When saxophonist Jimmy Amaro Sr. offered Bickert a place in his band in 1955, Bickert felt confident enough to quit his radio job and try making music his career. By 1957, Bickert had joined two local jazz groups, one led by saxophonist Moe Koffman, the other by clarinetist Phil Nimmons. Bickert played on Koffman's North American hit record "Swinging Shepherd Blues", which made it to number 23 on Billboard's Top 40 chart during the spring of 1958. With Nimmons, he began appearing regularly on CBC radio broadcasts and on records released internationally by Verve Records and RCA. During this period, Bickert also joined the rhythm section of the Howard Cable Orchestra, which was featured on the "Showtime" program on CBC TV.

=== Studio musician years and the beginning of The Boss Brass (1958–early 1970s) ===
By the end of the 1950s, Bickert was regularly working as a studio musician in Toronto, recording on commercial and jazz sessions. Bickert's commercial, radio, and television work increased through the 1960s, though he also continued to play jazz gigs at night.

During these years, Bickert first worked with Rob McConnell and many of the Toronto jazz musicians who later became the core of McConnell's Boss Brass big band. The Boss Brass was a part-time band led by McConnell for more than thirty years. The group was first organized in 1968 to record instrumental pop music for radio broadcast and the easy listening LP market, in the wake of the success of Herb Alpert's Tijuana Brass group. By 1976, the Boss Brass had added a saxophone section and had evolved into a contemporary jazz big band that played occasionally in Canadian jazz clubs and festivals. Bickert played and recorded with the group until 1998, appearing on more than 15 of the group's jazz-focused albums, and on most of the group's early commercial sessions as well. During the 1970s Bickert also continued to play in Moe Koffman's group, and Koffman himself was a fellow member of the Boss Brass during the 1970s and 1980s.

=== Playing for Paul Desmond ===
The rhythm section of Rob McConnell's Boss Brass—bassist Don Thompson, and drummer Terry Clarke—were frequent partners with Bickert at jazz gigs in Toronto in the early 1970s. By the mid-1970s, the trio of Bickert, Thompson, and Clarke was serving as the house band at Toronto's Bourbon Street nightclub, where visiting American jazz musicians would employ the group for extended engagements. In June, 1974, alto saxophonist Paul Desmond of the Dave Brubeck Quartet played a two-week engagement at the club with Bickert, Thompson, and Clarke. Desmond liked the Canadian musicians so much that he booked two more engagements for the following year. In September, 1974, Desmond brought Bickert to the United States to record the studio album Pure Desmond, which featured Bickert and Desmond in a quartet setting with Ron Carter and Connie Kay. This was Bickert's first major appearance playing jazz on a U.S. record label in over a decade, and it served as a showcase for Bickert's guitar playing. "I consider it Ed's album, really," Desmond told writer Gene Lees for the album's liner notes.

For his 1975 Bourbon Street engagements, Desmond hired drummer Jerry Fuller in place of Clarke, and started calling the band his "Canadian Group". Three live recordings by Desmond featuring Bickert, Thompson, and Fuller were issued from recordings made during 1975 at Bourbon Street. (In 2020, these were included as part of a 7-CD boxed set of Desmond's 1975 Toronto recordings that was released by Mosaic Records.) In September 1976, Bickert played for the last time with Desmond at shows in San Francisco and Monterey, California. At this time, Desmond was fighting lymphatic cancer, and the saxophonist died of the disease in May 1977.

In addition to Desmond, Bickert accompanied Zoot Sims, Art Farmer, Milt Jackson, Red Norvo, Frank Rosolino, and Kenny Wheeler, among others, at Bourbon Street from the mid-1970s to 1984, when the club changed its booking policy and stopped hiring touring jazz stars.

=== Starting a solo career (1975–1981) ===
In 1975, Bickert recorded his first solo album, a live trio recording with Don Thompson and Terry Clarke. The same group recorded a studio album in 1976, Out of the Past, which was unreleased until 2006. In 2019, Terry Clarke explained to journalist and music producer Bill King how The Ed Bickert Trio was organized:

"We were playing with Moe Koffman and Mr. Ed was kind of languishing in a super sideman world, and Don Thompson and I went downtown to Bourbon Street one night and we had decided between the two of us we were going to make Ed the leader, and we were going to be part of the Ed Bickert Trio. We cornered him on a break and told him he was going to be the leader, and we would organize everything. The trio didn't exist until we forced him to do it. That's when we decided to record whenever we did and recorded live at George's and a lot of CBC stuff too at Studio 4S."

Don Thompson made much the same point to Toronto Globe and Mail writer J.D. Considine in 2012, saying "He's not an aggressive guy....He was a reluctant bandleader."

With Thompson, Bickert also recorded duo albums in 1978 and 1980 (with Thompson appearing on piano for the latter). The Ed Bickert Trio served as the rhythm section on live and studio albums recorded in Toronto by Frank Rosolino, Ruby Braff, Buddy Tate, and Humphrey Littleton. As his solo jazz career blossomed in the mid-to-late-1970s, Bickert's commercial studio career in Toronto slowed down, which the guitarist attributed to his lack of interest in contemporary pop and rock guitar styles. He called the gradual phase out of his commercial work a "mutual parting", though he continued to take occasional commercial studio jobs when he felt like the music was a good fit for his style of playing.

During Bickert's career, most of his work was performing as a backing musician in the Toronto area (working in both live appearances and recording studio jobs). While Bickert did regularly record records as a leader or co-leader from 1975 to 1999, he did not pursue a career as a touring bandleader. Bickert did occasionally do short tours outside of Canada as a member The Concord All-Stars, The Canadian All-Stars, and in the groups of Paul Desmond, Milt Jackson, Rosemary Clooney, and Rob McConnell, appearing in the United States, Europe, and Japan.

=== The Concord years and beyond (1982–2000) ===
By 1982, Bickert had secured a recording contract with Concord Jazz, for which he recorded nine albums as a leader or co-leader between 1983 and 1997. Bickert also appeared on the label as a backing musician for artists including Benny Carter, Ken Peplowski, Rob McConnell, Fraser MacPherson, and Rosemary Clooney. Bickert played on five Clooney albums between 1983 and 1987, and the two recorded nine songs during these years as guitar/vocal duets.

In the 1990s, the pace of Bickert's recording and performing career began to slow down. He made no albums as a solo leader after 1989's Third Floor Richard, though he continued to record regularly with The Boss Brass, and with groups led by Moe Koffman and Toronto drummer Barry Elmes. He also appeared on several albums each by singers Trudy Desmond and Shirley Eikhard. His last two small-group Concord recordings were a live duo album with pianist Bill Mays, and a trio album co-led by Rob McConnell and Don Thompson. Bickert made two more small-group jazz recordings in 1999, as part of a cooperative trio organized by Mike Murley specifically to provide Bickert with an opportunity to play jazz standards in public.

== Retirement ==
In the winter of 1995, Bickert slipped on some ice and broke bones in both of his arms, which halted his musical activity for a period of months. Then, in 2000, his wife Madeline died, and Bickert decided, at age 67, to retire completely from music. Bickert's son Jeffery explained to Billboard magazine in 2019:

"Madeline kept him focused, on track, and without her it was very different and difficult for him. So he let that go, ended up working in the garden, caring for the pool he never swam in, perfecting his knowledge of bird songs, spending time with his grandchildren and listening to performers he didn't know, many of them younger, and discovering a love for certain musical styles in the classical genre, as well as returning to early 20th century composers, whom he had always found compelling. And getting out, with the help of my/our sister Lindsey, to hear pianists -- Ed liked listening to pianists more than anyone else."

Bickert himself explained his retirement to the Toronto Globe & Mail in 2012:

"I haven't played for 12 years, and I don't know if I could even remember how to hold the instrument right now. No, I just packed it up completely. Maybe I'd had enough… My wife passed away, and at the time, I was having some problems with arthritis, and I was starting to drink quite heavily, and those things combined sort of finished me off. I just never tried to get back to it. I envy or admire people who keep going until they drop. But it just wasn't for me."

== Personal life ==
Bickert married Madeline Mulholland, a private secretary, in the early 1960s. The couple had four children, and were married until Madeline's death in 2000. One of Bickert's daughters predeceased him in 2013. Bickert passed away from cancer in Bridgepoint Health, Toronto at the age of 86.

== Musical style ==
Bickert was a mainstream jazz musician, specializing in interpreting jazz standards from the Great American Songbook, and instrumentals from the swing era. Bickert occasionally recorded tunes from the 1940s bebop repertoire (Charlie Parker's "Ah-Leu-Cha" and "Barbados"), and the 1950s hard bop repertoire (Jimmy Heath's "C.T.A." and Horace Silver's "Nica's Dream").

Bickert had a reputation for knowing many semi-obscure pop ballads from the 1920s-1950s, and on his own albums, he recorded such examples as "I'll Wait and Pray", "Keeping Myself for You", "I'll Never Stop Loving You", "I Know Why (And So Do You)", and "Maybe You'll Be There".

Bickert did not typically play music from the modal jazz and jazz fusion styles that were predominant during the height of his career in the 1970s and 1980s. He explained his thoughts on these contemporary jazz sounds to Downbeat magazine in 1984, when he was 52:

"I haven't really heard that many of the newer guitar players. Some of the few that I've heard, who are more up to date, like John Scofield, I enjoy. Ralph Towner, I can't name too many. Some of it I enjoy; some of it I just appreciate. At the same time I don't think that I can start trying to play anything close to that, as far as being more modern, more sophisticated, or more assertive. That's partly because I don't have the background in harmony and such that some of the younger guys do. It’s partly because I'm in that age bracket, I suppose, where you get settled into something. And it's partly my nature. I'm not an aggressive kind of person; the way I play's like that, too."

Bickert's facility for accompanying a soloist was frequently noted by musicians and jazz writers as one of the things that made his playing noteworthy. Jazz journalist Mark Miller wrote, "It is not to diminish his solos, which are models of succinct melodicism, to suggest that the Bickert identity lies in the chords that he plays." Musician Don Thompson, who played bass with Bickert from the early 1970s to the late 1990s, said, "The inner voice movement was perfect, the logic is impeccable, every chord was the best possible chord … it was perfection all the time."

Bickert's solos, Miller wrote, were in the melody-driven tradition associated with players like Lester Young and Chet Baker: "[Their] harmonic sophistication notwithstanding, their direction is essentially linear—or rather, naturally linear, full of graceful movement and bluesy inflection."

Bassist Steve Wallace, who played and recorded with Bickert from the early 1980s through the late 1990s, wrote:

"His playing could be lyrical, sophisticated and elegant, but there was also some grit and earthiness there, and in this regard he reminds me of vibraphonist Milt Jackson, another great musician Ed played very well with. Both are heavily, but not exclusively, rooted in the blues – it informs their phrasing, ideas, sound, where they leave spaces and so on. Ed could also make more pure music just accompanying people than most musicians could when soloing or in the spotlight. This was my favourite aspect of his playing, great though his solos could be.

== Use of solid-body guitar ==
Bickert was noteworthy as being one of the few mainstream jazz guitarists in the 1970s and 1980s who used a solid-body electric guitar, particularly a Fender Telecaster. This model of guitar was more associated with other genres of music like rock or country than with jazz. There were a few predecessors with solid body guitar in jazz, but hollow body or semi-hollow electric guitars were far more common in this era and Bickert's Telecaster was unusual.

At the beginning of his career, Bickert played hollow-bodied electric guitars, including a Gibson ES-175. Bickert can be heard playing this instrument on Phil Nimmons' 1960 Verve album Nimmons 'n' Nine. Bickert said of the ES-175 "I guess I chose that guitar because guys like Jim Hall and Joe Pass were playing one. I played that for many years. But because of all the studio work I was doing, I needed the versatility of a solid body guitar so I got the Telecaster. It did take a while to get used to it for jazz playing."

Bickert bought his Fender Telecaster in the mid-1960s, and found it to be durable and a practical instrument for live gigs. Solid-bodied electric guitars are less susceptible to tuning issues and damage caused by fluctuation in temperature, and less susceptible to unwanted audio feedback. And, Bickert liked being able to transport his guitar in a lightweight gig bag without worrying that it would be damaged by accidental knocks or impacts. In 1978, Bickert replaced the original Fender single-coil neck pickup with a Gibson humbucker pickup, which was the only significant modification he made to the instrument over the decades that he played it. Bickert was able to play his Telecaster in a wide variety of musical contexts, from big band sessions with Sammy Nestico and Rob McConnell to the intimate jazz played by Paul Desmond, and to exploit the unique qualities that solid-bodied instruments have, particularly regarding the sustaining of notes and chords.

According to bassist Don Thompson, the solid-body guitar was key to shaping Bickert's aesthetic, particularly as an accompanist: "The Telecaster was his instrument, and I don't think he could have done it on another guitar. It had a lot to do with that sound. It was so dark, giving the illusion the chords were way bigger than they were. It was that sustain, and he was so in tune that set him apart." Journalist Mark Miller wrote that Bickert's chords "pulsed with a soft glow," and guitarist Lorne Lofsky said "The sound he got out of his guitar was very different. The first time I heard the Pure Desmond album, I thought that it was an electric piano playing the chords."

Though Bickert's Telecaster tone was praised by musicians and fans, Bickert himself was not always fond of it. He told Guitar Player magazine in 1978:

"There are also things about the Telecaster that I really don't like at all. The body shape of the thing is kind of strange. I don't care about aesthetics–I wouldn't care what any of these things look like–it's just the way it feels; the balance isn't right. Tone is another thing, because the sound I'm getting is a compromise. The sound I like is the sound George Benson or Jim Hall gets. The sound I'm trying to get out of the Telecaster never quite comes off. It seems that in order to get rid of the ringy quality of the Tele you have to cut off the highs to the point where it gets muddy."

Despite these reservations, however, Bickert recorded almost exclusively using the Telecaster during the final three decades of his career, including on all of the albums for which he was leader or co-leader.

== Awards and honors ==
- Juno Award for Best Jazz Recording, Sackville 4005 with Don Thompson, 1980
- Juno Award for Best Traditional Jazz Album - Instrumental, Live at the Senator with Mike Murley and Steve Wallace, 2002
- Juno Award for Best Traditional Jazz Album, Test of Time with Mike Murley and Steve Wallace, 2013
- Member of the Order of Canada, 1996

== Discography ==
=== As leader or co-leader ===
- 1976 - Ed Bickert (PM)
- 1976 - Out of the Past (first released in 2006 on Sackville)
- 1977 - I Like to Recognize the Tune (Canadian Talent Library/United Artists)
- 1978 - Ed Bickert/Don Thompson - (Sackville, reissued in 2004 on CD with 4 bonus tracks as At the Garden Party)
- 1979 - Jazz Canada Europe '79 - Ed Bickert Trio; 1 LP in 4-LP boxed set (Radio Canada International) (reissued as part of The Guitar Mastery Of Ed Bickert, Unidisc, 1996)
- 1979 - Days Gone By - Sonny Greenwich and Ed Bickert Quartet (first released in 2000) (Sackville)
- 1980 - Dance to the Lady - Don Thompson and Ed Bickert (piano / guitar duets) (Sackville)
- 1983 - At Toronto's Bourbon Street - The Ed Bickert 5 feat. Scott Hamilton and Warren Vaché (Concord Jazz)
- 1984 - Bye Bye Baby - Ed Bickert Quartet featuring Dave McKenna (Concord Jazz)
- 1984 - Mutual Street - duets with Rob McConnell (Innovation, reissued in 1993 by Jazz Alliance/Concord)
- 1985 - I Wished On The Moon - Ed Bickert Quartet featuring Rick Wilkins (Concord Jazz)
- 1985 - The Quartet Of Lorne Lofsky & Ed Bickert And Friends - Lorne Lofsky and Ed Bickert (Unisson, reissued in 2022 by Cornerstone Records)
- 1989 - Third Floor Richard - Ed Bickert Trio with special guest Dave McKenna (Concord Jazz)
- 1990 - This is New - Ed Bickert/Lorne Lofsky Quartet (Concord Jazz)
- 1994 - Trio Sketches - with Rob McConnell, Neil Swainson (Concord Jazz)
- 1994 - Concord Duo Series Volume 7 - with Bill Mays (Concord Jazz)
- 1997 - Three for the Road - with Rob McConnell, Don Thompson (Concord Jazz)
- 1999 - Test of Time with Mike Murley, Steve Wallace (first released in 2012) (Cornerstone Records)
- 2000 - Live at the Senator with Mike Murley, Steve Wallace (Cornerstone Records)

=== With Paul Desmond ===
- 1974 - Pure Desmond (CTI)
- 1975 - Live (A&M/Horizon)
- 1975 - Paul Desmond (Artists House, released 1978)
- 1975 - Like Someone in Love (Telarc, released 1992)
- 1975 - The Complete 1975 Toronto Recordings (Mosaic, released 2020, includes all of Live, Paul Desmond, and Like Someone in Love, plus previously unreleased music)
- 1976 - Edmonton Festival '76 (Gambit, released 2008)

=== With Rosemary Clooney ===
- 1983 - Rosemary Clooney Sings the Music of Harold Arlen (Concord)
- 1984 - Rosemary Clooney Sings the Music of Irving Berlin (Concord)
- 1985 - Rosemary Clooney Sings Ballads (Concord)
- 1986 - Rosemary Clooney Sings the Music of Jimmy Van Heusen (Concord)
- 1987 - Rosemary Clooney Sings the Lyrics of Johnny Mercer (Concord)

=== Selected appearances as backing musician ===
- 1957 - Cool And Hot Sax - Moe Koffman (Jubilee Records)
- 1960 - Phil Nimmons and Nine - Phil Nimmons (Verve)
- 1963 - Take Ten - Phil Nimmons Group (RCA)
- 1964 - Mary Poppins Swings - Phil Nimmons Group (RCA)
- 1976 - Thinking of You - Frank Rosolino (Sackville)
- 1979 - Ruby Braff With The Ed Bickert Trio - Ruby Braff (Sackville)
- 1981 - The Ballad Artistry of Buddy Tate - Buddy Tate with The Ed Bickert Trio (Sackville)
- 1983 - Humphrey Lyttelton in Canada - Humphrey Lyttelton with The Ed Bickert Trio (Sackville)
- 1985 - Old Friends/New Music - Rob McConnell Sextet (Unisson, reissued in 2023 by Cornerstone Records)
- 1985 - Jazz Prose - Fraser MacPherson Quintet (Concord)
- 1985 - A Gentleman and His Music - Benny Carter (Concord)
- 1985 - Night Flight - Sammy Nestico (Sea Breeze)
- 1985 - With a Song in My Heart - Jane Hall with Ed Bickert (ArtistShare, first released 2017)
- 1987 - Double Exposure - Ken Peplowski (Concord Records)
- 1988 - Oop-Pop-A-Da - Moe Koffman feat. Dizzy Gillespie (Soundwing)
- 1990 - The Jive 5 - Rob McConnell (Concord)
- 1993 - East-West - Barry Elmes (Cornerstone Records)
- 1994 - Jamie Mitges and the Jazz Legends - Jamie Mitges Quintet (self-published/RDR Music Group)
- 1997 - Different Voices - Barry Elmes (Cornerstone Records)

=== Selected albums with the Boss Brass ===
- 1976 - The Jazz Album (Attic)
- 1977 - Big Band Jazz (Umbrella)
- 1978 - Again! (Umbrella)
- 1980 - Present Perfect (MPS)
- 1981 - Tribute (Pausa)
- 1981 - Live in Digital (Palo Alto)
- 1983 - All in Good Time (Sea Breeze/Palo Alto, 1982)
- 1985 - Atras Da Porta (Innovation)
- 1985 - Boss Brass and Woods (Innovation)
- 1991 - The Brass Is Back (Concord)
- 1992 - Brassy and Sassy (Concord)
- 1993 - Our 25th Year (Concord)
- 1994 - Overtime (Concord)
- 1995 - Don't Get Around Much Anymore (Concord)
- 1996 - Even Canadians Get the Blues (Concord)
- 1997 - Rob McConnell and the Boss Brass Play the Jazz Classics (Concord)
- 1998 - Big Band Christmas (Concord)

See The Boss Brass for more information.
