= Alvin Robinson (musician) =

American R&B singer, guitarist and songwriter (1937–1989)

- Alvin "Shine" Robinson

Background information
- Also known as: Al Robinson "Shine"
- Born: December 22, 1937; New Orleans, Louisiana, United States
- Died: January 25, 1989 (aged 51) New Orleans
- Genres: Rhythm and blues
- Occupations: Singer, guitarist, songwriter
- Instruments: Vocals, guitar
- Years active: c.1958 – c.1980
- Labels: Imperial, Tiger, Red Bird, Atco, A.F.O., Pulsar Records, Blue Cat (U.S.) Records, Charly Records, Joe Jones Records, Strike Records

Alvin "Shine" Robinson (December 22, 1937 – January 25, 1989), sometimes credited as Al Robinson, was an American rhythm and blues singer, guitarist, and songwriter, based in New Orleans. His recording of "Something You Got" reached the Billboard Hot 100 in 1964.

== Biography ==
He was born in New Orleans, and by the late 1950s was established as a session musician in the city. In 1961, he recorded for Imperial Records in New Orleans, with "I'm Leaving You Today" betraying his influence by Ray Charles. His management was soon taken over by singer Joe Jones, who had had a hit with "You Talk Too Much" and who won Robinson a recording contract with Tiger Records, a new label set up in New York City by songwriters and record producers Jerry Leiber and Mike Stoller. In 1964, he recorded a version of Chris Kenner's song "Something You Got". The song, featuring Robinson's "fantastically bluesy growl", rose to no.52 on the Billboard pop chart.

He moved with Leiber and Stoller to their next label, Red Bird Records, and recorded "Down Home Girl", a song written by Leiber with Artie Butler, arranged by Joe Jones, and produced by Leiber and Stoller. Although the record was critically acclaimed, and was regarded by Leiber and Stoller as the best record issued on the Red Bird label, it was not a commercial success, but was covered by the Rolling Stones on their 1965 album The Rolling Stones No. 2. Robinson's later recordings for Red Bird and its subsidiary Blue Cat label, including a reshaped version of "Let The Good Times Roll" arranged by Wardell Quezergue, also failed to reach the charts. This version inspired both Jimi Hendrix and Stevie Ray Vaughan to cover it. Dr. John also covered the song on his 1972 album Dr. John's Gumbo.

Robinson continued to record in his own name and as a session guitarist. He moved to Los Angeles, and recorded "Let Me Down Easy", written by King Curtis, for Atco in 1967. He also began playing with Dr. John, and appeared as a guitarist on the albums Babylon, Dr. John's Gumbo, and Hollywood Be Thy Name, as well as co-writing several album tracks with Dr. John. As a solo performer, Robinson recorded for Harold Battiste's A.F.O. and Pulsar labels; one of his recordings for Pulsar, "Sho' Bout To Drive Me Wild", featured contributions from many New Orleans musicians including Battiste, Dr. John, Jessie Hill and King Floyd. He was also credited on Carly Simon's album Playing Possum, Ringo Starr's Goodnight Vienna, and Tom Waits' Blue Valentine.

Robinson later returned to New Orleans, where he died in 1989 at the age of 51.

== Discography ==
1961

- "Haul Off and Die Over You" – Charly CRB 1181
- "Baby Don't Blame Me" – Charly CRB 1181
- "I'm Leaving You Today" – Imperial 5727
- "Pain In My Heart" – Imperial 5727
- "Wake Up (And Face Reality)" – Imperial 5762
- "I Wanna Know" – Imperial 5762
- "Truly" – Charly CRB 1181

1962

- "Oh Red" – Post 10001, Imperial 5824
- "The Blues" – Post 10001, Imperial 5824
- "They Said It Couldn't Be Done" – Charly CRB 1181
- "Lazy Mary" – Charly CRB 1181
- "Dedicated To Domino" – Charly CRB 1181
- "Little Eva" – unissued
- "The Same Old Lonesome Town" – unissued
- "I Can't Open The Door To Your Heart" – unissued
- "The Wise Old Weeping Willow Tree" – unissued

1964

- "Something You Got" – Tiger TI-104, Blue Cat BC-104
- "Searchin'" – Tiger TI-104, Blue Cat BC-104
- "Fever" – Red Bird RB-10-010
- "Down Home Girl" – Red Bird RB-10-010

1965

- "How Can I Get Over You" – Blue Cat BC-108
- "I'm Gonna Put Some Hurt On You" – Blue Cat BC-108
- "Bottom Of My Soul" – Blue Cat BC-113
- "Let The Good Times Roll" – Blue Cat BC-113

1966

- "Whatever You Had You Ain't Got It No More" – Joe Jones JJ-1, Strike JH-307
- "You Brought My Heart Right Down To My Knees" – Joe Jones JJ-1, Strike JH-307

1968

- "She Knows What To Do For Me" – unissued
- "Ton Of Joy" – unissued
- "Let Me Down Easy" – Atco 6581
- "Baby Don't You Do It" – Atco 6581
- "Get Out Of My Life, Woman" – unissued
- "Niki Hokey" – unissued
- "If It Don't Work Out" – unissued

1969

- "Empty Talk" – Pulsar 2408
- "Sho' Bout To Drive Me Wild" – Pulsar 2408
- "Give Her Up" – Pulsar 2417
- "Soulful Woman" – Pulsar 2417
- "Tuned In, Turned On" – Ace (UK) CDCHD 450
- "Better Be Cool" – Ace (UK) CDCHD 462
- "I've Never Been In Love" – Ace (UK) CDCHD 462
- "We Got Love" – Ace (UK) CDCHD 462
- "Serpent Woman" – Ace (UK) CDCHD 520
- "Cry, Cry, Cry" – Ace (UK) CDCHD 520
