= Ray Norris (musician) =

Canadian guitarist and bandleader (1916–1958)

- Born: 1916; Saskatoon, Saskatchewan, Canada
- Died: December 21, 1958 (aged 42); Toronto, Ontario, Canada
- Genres: Jazz
- Instruments: Guitar

Ray Norris (1916 – December 21, 1958) was a Canadian guitarist and bandleader, known for his performances on CBC radio and television in the 1940s and 1950s.

== Background ==
Born in Saskatoon, Saskatchewan, Norris played in country-swing bands on Vancouver Radio in the 1930s. In 1941, he formed the Ray Norris Quintet, originally based in Vancouver but later Toronto. The quintet included Fraser MacPherson and Phil Nimmons early in their careers, and had its own CBC Radio program, Serenade in Rhythm, until 1950. In 1949, they recorded four original titles. During the 1950s, Norris continued to work on the CBC radio and television from Vancouver. He moved to Toronto with a country group, the Rhythm Pals, just before his death in 1958.
