= Bourbon Street (Toronto) =

Canadian jazz club

Bourbon Street was a jazz club located at 180 Queen Street West in Toronto, Ontario. Operating between 1971 and 1986, it was one of Toronto's preeminent jazz clubs and featured many internationally renowned musicians.

== History ==
Bourbon Street was opened in 1971 by Doug Cole, also the owner of George's Spaghetti House. The club featured a largely American musical lineup that was backed by a local house band. In the fall of 1975 both Jim Hall and Paul Desmond recorded live albums at the club for A&M Records. These albums both feature all-Canadian bands.

Cole sold the club in 1983; Bourbon Street continued to feature music until 1986. The building has since been demolished.

== Live albums ==
- Jim Hall - Jim Hall Live! (1975)
- Paul Desmond - The Paul Desmond Quartet Live (1975)
- Ed Bickert - Ed Bickert at Toronto's Bourbon Street (1983)
- Lenny Breau Dave Young - Live at Bourbon Street (1983)

Newly released

- Paul Desmond - Like Someone in Love: Live in Toronto
- Paul Desmond - Audrey: Live in Toronto 1975
