= Fraser MacPherson =

Canadian jazz musician (1928–1993)

Fraser MacPherson CM
- Fraser MacPherson

Background information
- Born: John Fraser MacPherson; 10 April 1928; Saint Boniface, Manitoba, Canada
- Died: 27 September 1993 (aged 65) Vancouver, British Columbia, Canada
- Genres: Jazz
- Occupation: Musician
- Instruments: Saxophone, clarinet, piano

John Fraser MacPherson CM (10 April 1928 – 27 September 1993) was a Canadian jazz musician from Saint Boniface, Manitoba.

== Early life and career ==
MacPherson moved to Victoria, British Columbia, as a child. He learned piano, clarinet, and alto and tenor saxophones. After moving to Vancouver to continue a commerce degree, he played in bands led by Ray Norris, Dave Robbins, Paul Ruhland, and Doug Parke. He led his own groups and eventually took over the leadership of the Cave supper club band. He took a year's leave in 1958 to study in New York City, adding flute to his list of instruments. He played on the CBC and won a Juno Award for Best Jazz Album in 1983. He was awarded the Order of Canada in 1987.

Throughout the 1960s and 1970s MacPherson was a first-call studio player in Vancouver, as well as leading the house band at the Cave supper club. He also taught briefly in the Jazz and Commercial Music department at Vancouver Community College, where his students included future Powder Blues Band baritone saxophonist Gordie Bertram and New Orleans–based saxophonist and jazz educator John Doheny. Live at the Planetarium, MacPherson's first album as leader of a small jazz group, was recorded for broadcast on the French-language CBC radio network. He leased the master tapes and released them on his own independent label, West End Records. The album was re-released by Concord Records, and MacPherson went on to record several other releases for them. He also recorded for Sackville Records in Toronto and Justin Time Records in Montreal.

In the summer of 1993, Pacific Music Industry Association (PMIA) created the Fraser MacPherson Scholarship Fund which annually awards grants of $2000 to four to eight aspiring music students. Later that year MacPherson died in Vancouver at the age of 65.

== Gallery ==
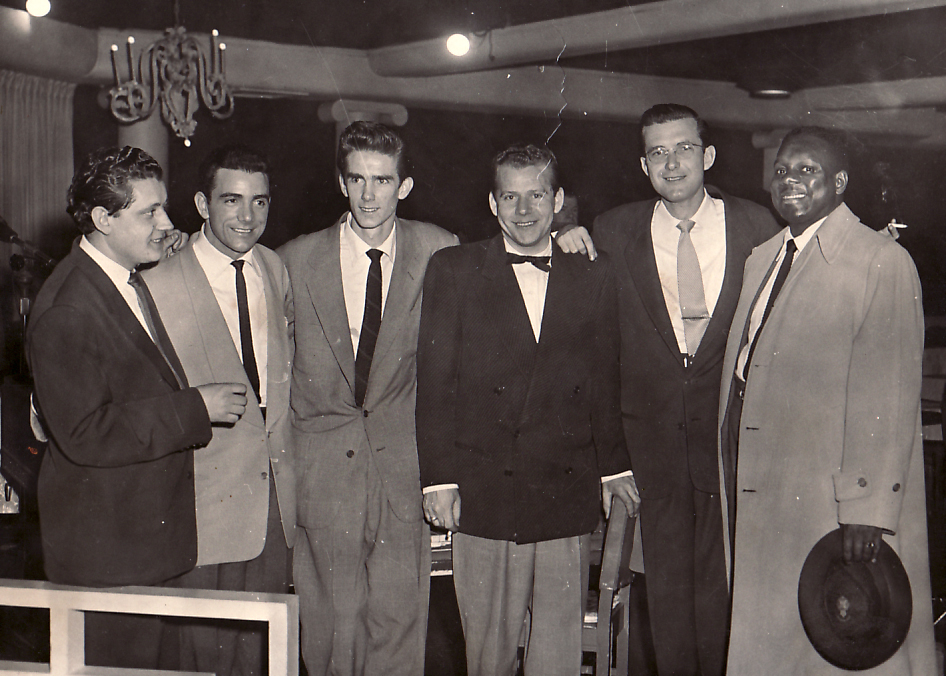
From left: Chris Gage, Louis Bellson, Stan "Cuddles" Johnson, Tony Gage, Fraser MacPherson, Harry Carney (Photo from the Fraser MacPherson estate)

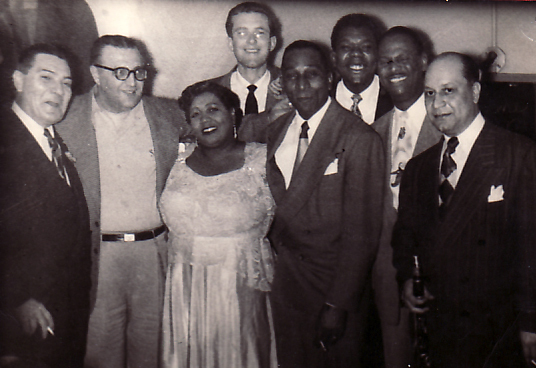
From left: Jack Teagarden, Sandy DeSantis, Velma Middleton, Fraser MacPherson, Cozy Cole, Arvell Shaw, Earl Hines, Barney Bigard at the Palomar Supper Club in Vancouver, B.C. (17 March 1951)

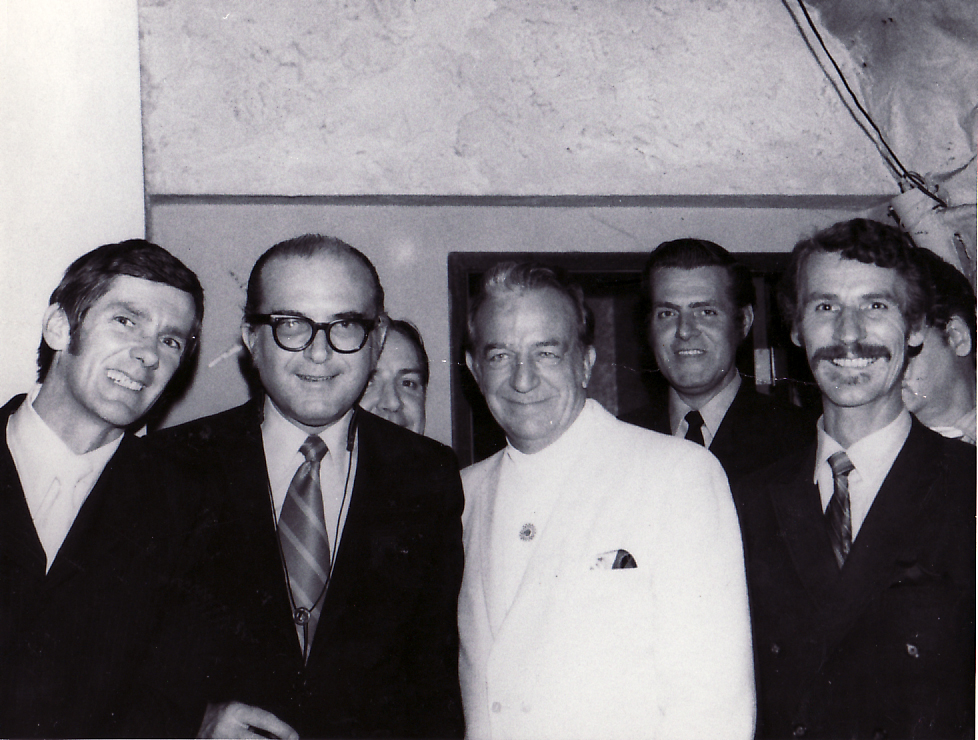
From left: Stan "Cuddles" Johnson, Fraser MacPherson, Bob Smith, Harry James, Al Johnson, Stew Barnett. (The Cave Supper Club, May 1970)

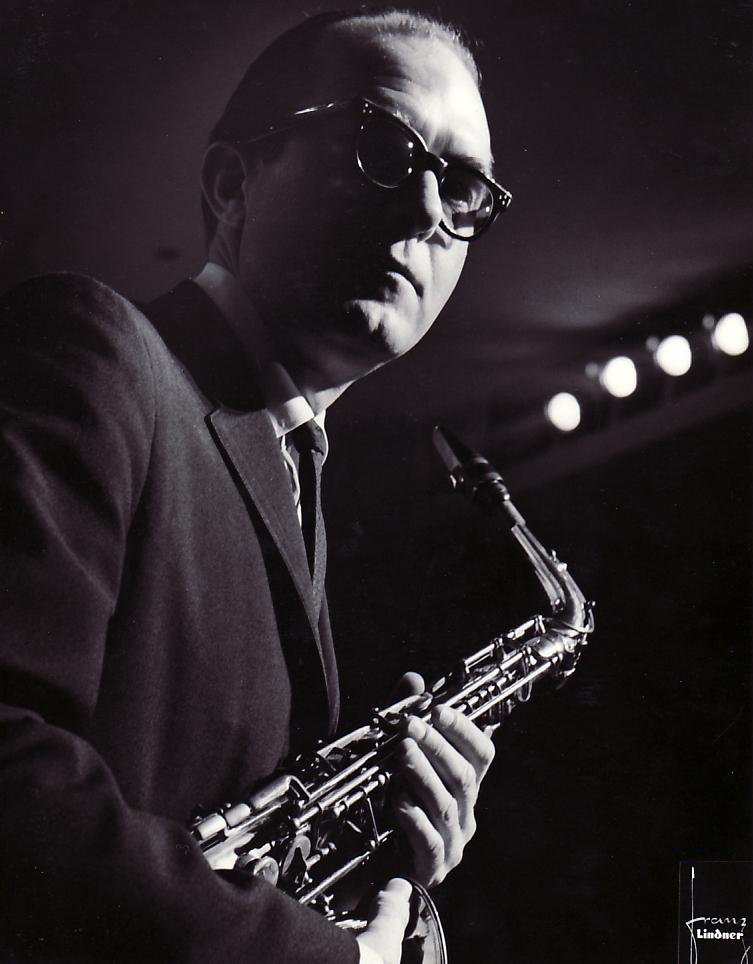
MacPherson in 1966 (photo by Franz Lindner)

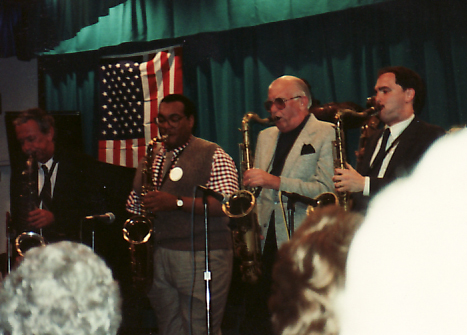
MacPherson in Otter Crest, Oregon, May 1989. From left: Spike Robinson, Jeff Clayton, MacPherson, and Ken Peplowski
