= John Snyder (producer) =

American record producer

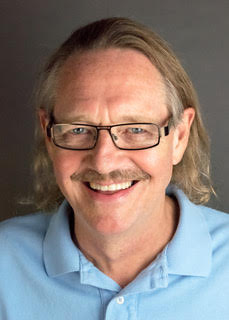

John Snyder (born April 14, 1948) is an American record producer and artist manager specializing in jazz and blues. Over four decades, he recorded several hundred sessions with dozens of artists including Dave Brubeck, Etta James and James Cotton for record labels including A&M/Horizon, Verve, Telarc, Atlantic, House of Blues and his own Artists House label.

== Career ==
John Snyder's work as a record producer, has garnered five Grammy Awards, including Best Jazz Instrumental Performance, Big Band in 1979 for Thad Jones & Mel Lewis – Live in Munich, Best Jazz Vocal Album in 1995 for Etta James – Mystery Lady: Songs of Billie Holiday, and Best Traditional Blues Album in 1996 for James Cotton – Deep in the Blues.

Snyder began his recording career with Creed Taylor's CTI Records, working as a recording engineer on sessions with Paul Desmond, Jim Hall and others. He joined Herb Alpert's A&M Records in the mid-1970s where Snyder was charged with establishing a separate jazz label, A&M Horizon. From 1975-77, Snyder produced over two dozen albums for Horizon by artists including Thad Jones, Mel Lewis, Dave Brubeck, Dave Liebman, Jim Hall (musician), Paul Desmond, Charlie Haden, Don Cherry, Chet Baker and Ornette Coleman.

== Artists House ==
Snyder established his own Artists House label in 1977, recruiting several of the artists he had worked with at Horizon. Artists House developed a reputation for deluxe LP packaging and quality music, as well as for prioritizing the artists' interests. Between 1997-1982, Artists House delivered over 20 albums by Coleman, Haden, Liebman, Baker, Hall and Desmond, all of whom Snyder had worked with at Horizon. He also added to the Artists House lineup with James Blood Ulmer, Cecil Taylor, Art Pepper and Gil Evans.

Snyder's close relationship with many of these artists led him to his role as an artist manager and advocate, managing the careers of Gerry Mulligan, Chet Baker, Jim Hall, Ornette Coleman, Gil Evans and Art Pepper.

During the late 1990s and on into the new millennium, Snyder delved more into the blues, working with Gitanes Blues, Evidence and House of Blues labels. He recorded a few dozen albums with artists including Lucky Peterson, Johnny Copeland, Lightnin' Hopkins, Big Daddy Kinsey, Joe Louis Walker, James Cotton, Johnny Copeland, Larry Garner, Lucky Peterson, Larry McCray, Billy Branch and Derek Trucks. With House of Blues, Snyder produced several popular tributes albums with various artists recording songs of Bob Dylan, Rolling Stones, Eric Clapton and Led Zeppelin. Snyder's biggest project for House of Blues was the Dixie Hummingbirds 70th Anniversary Celebration record with pop stars including Paul Simon, Stevie Wonder and Wynona Judd.

== Reissues and compilations ==
In 1987, Snyder returned to A&M Records to produce a few dozen compilations and reissued albums by artists including George Benson, Dave Brubeck, Don Cherry, Ornette Coleman, Paul Desmond, Gil Evans, Charlie Haden, Antonio Carlos Jobim, Quincy Jones, Herbie Mann, Wes Montgomery and a few others. Snyder also produced over 300 compilations and reissues for BMG, Sony, Atlantic, Concord, GRP and Victor Jazz.

Snyder was personally Grammy Award nominated as producer in the Best Traditional Blues Album category in 2002 for Hellhound on My Trail: The Songs of Robert Johnson, a tribute to Johnson.
