= Juno Award for Contemporary Jazz Album of the Year =

Canadian music award

The Juno Award for Contemporary Jazz Album of the Year was presented as recognition each year for the best contemporary jazz album in Canada. It was first presented in 1994, after the Juno Awards split the former award for Best Jazz Album into separate categories for contemporary and traditional jazz, and was discontinued after 2014, when the traditional and contemporary jazz categories were replaced with new categories for Jazz Album - Solo and Jazz Album - Group.

== Winners ==
=== Best Contemporary Jazz Album (1994 – 1999) ===
| Year | Winner(s) | Album | Nominees | Ref. |
|---|---|---|---|---|
| 1994 | Holly Cole Trio | Don't Smoke in Bed | Michael Farquharson, Michael Farquharson; Five After Four feat. Vito Razza, Notorious; Garbo's Hat, Face the Music; David Mott, The Standard Line | |
| 1995 | Jim Hillman and The Merlin Factor | The Merlin Factor | Mark Duggan, We Were Talking; Sonny Greenwich, Hymn to the Earth; Joe Sealy and Paul Novotny, Dual Vision; John Stetch, Carpathian Blues | |
| 1996 | Neufeld-Occhipinti Jazz Orchestra | NOJO | Jane Bunnett, Rendez-vous Brazil Cuba; Rich Shadrach Lazar and Montuno Police, Touch; The Merlin Factor, Frontier Tunes; Carol Welsman, Lucky to Be Me | |
| 1997 | Joe Sealy | Africville Suite | Paul Bley and Kenny Wheeler, Touché; James Gelfand, Time Zones; Sonny Greenwich, Spirit in the Air; Neufeld-Occhipinti Jazz Orchestra, FireWater | |
| 1998 | Metalwood | Metalwood | Stefan Bauer, Best of Two Worlds; D.D. Jackson, Paired Down, Volume One; Ted Quinlan, As If; Carol Welsman, Inclined | |
| 1999 | Metalwood | Metalwood 2 | Hard Rubber Orchestra, Cruel Yet Fair; François Houle, In the Vernacular: The Music of John Carter; Phil Dwyer, Road Stories; Neufeld-Occhipinti Jazz Orchestra, You Are Here | |

=== Best Contemporary Jazz Album – Instrumental (2000 – 2002) ===
| Year | Winner(s) | Album | Nominees | Ref. |
|---|---|---|---|---|
| 2000 | D. D. Jackson | ...So Far | Jeff Johnston, The Field; Joe Sealy and Paul Novotny, Blue Jade; Bob Shaw and Freeflight, Freeflight; Jean-Pierre Zanella, Puzzle City | |
| 2001 | François Carrier Trio | Compassion | Knut Haaugsoen, Step and a Half; Michael Kaeshammer, No Strings Attached; Metalwood, Metalwood 3; Michael Occhipinti, Creation Dream | |
| 2002 | François Bourassa Trio and André Leroux | Live | D.D. Jackson, Sigame; Jeff Johnston, Nuage; Metalwood, The Recline; Chris Tarry, Of Battles Unknown Mysteries | |

=== Contemporary Jazz Album of the Year (2003 – 2014) ===
| Year | Winner(s) | Album | Nominees | Ref. |
|---|---|---|---|---|
| 2003 | Richard Underhill | Tales from the Blue Lounge | Mark Duggan's Vuja dé, Mistura; Warren Hill, Love Songs; Neufeld-Occhipinti Jazz Orchestra, Highwire; Jean-Pierre, Mother Tree | |
| 2004 | Great Uncles of the Revolution | Blow the House Down | François Bourassa Quartet, Indefinite Time; D. D. Jackson, Suite for New York; Michael Kaeshammer, Strut; Metalwood, Chronic | |
| 2005 | Hilario Durán Trio | New Danzon | Neufeld-Occhipinti Jazz Orchestra with Sam Rivers, City of Neighbourhoods; Alain Caron, 5; Jane Bunnett, Red Dragonfly (aka Tombo); Sekoya, Sekoya | |
| 2006 | Jane Bunnett | Radio Guantánamo (Guantánamo Blues Project Vol. 1) | Hilario Durán and Perspectiva, Encuentro en la Habana; Marc Rogers, Robi Botos, Phil Dwyer and Terri Lyne Carrington, One Take: Volume Two; David Buchbinder, Shurum Burum Jazz Circus; Roberto Occhipinti, Yemaya | |
| 2007 | Hilario Durán and His Latin Jazz Big Band | From the Heart | Ingrid Jensen, At Sea; Hugh Marsh, Hugmars; Richard Underhill, Moment in Time; Kent Sangster, Obsession | |
| 2008 | The Chris Tarry Group | Almost Certainly Dreaming | Michael Occhipinti and Creation Dream, Chasing After Light; David Occhipinti, Forty Revolutions; Altered Laws, Metaphora; Manteca, Onward! | |
| 2009 | Jane Bunnett | Embracing Voices | Roberto Occhipinti, A Bend in the River; Barry Romberg's Random Access Large Ensemble, Existential Detective; François Bourassa Quartet, Rasstones; Michael Occhipinti, The Sicilian Jazz Project | |
| 2010 | Charles Spearin | The Happiness Project | Darcy James Argue's Secret Society, Infernal Machines; Hilario Durán, Motion; John Roney with the Silver Birch String Quartet, Silverbirch; Kirk MacDonald Quartet, Songbook Vol. 1 | |
| 2011 | Christine Jensen Jazz Orchestra | Treelines | Chet Doxas, Big Sky; Matt Herskowitz, Jerusalem Trilogy; Kelly Jefferson Quartet, Next Exit; Adrean Farrugia, Ricochet | |
| 2012 | Phil Dwyer Orchestra feat. Mark Fewer | Changing Seasons | Hilario Durán and Jane Bunnett, Cuban Rhapsody; François Bourassa Quartet, Idiosyncrasie; Colin Stetson, New History Warfare Vol. 2: Judges; Chris Tarry, Rest of the Story | |
| 2013 | Joel Miller | Swim | Alex Goodman Quintet, Bridges; Allison Au Quartet, The Sky Was Pale Blue, Then Grey; François Houle 5+1, Genera; Rafael Zaldivar, Drawing | |
| 2014 | Christine Jensen Jazz Orchestra | Habitat | Brandi Disterheft, Gratitude; Darcy James Argue's Secret Society, Brooklyn Babylon; Earl MacDonald, Mirror of the Mind; Trifolia, Le refuge | |
