= Juno Award for Traditional Jazz Album of the Year =

Canadian music award

The Juno Award for Traditional Jazz Album of the Year was presented as recognition each year for the best traditional jazz album in Canada. It was first presented in 1994, after the Juno Awards split the former award for Best Jazz Album into separate categories for traditional and contemporary jazz, and was discontinued after 2014, when the traditional and contemporary jazz categories were replaced with new categories for Jazz Album - Solo and Jazz Album - Group.

== Winners ==
=== Best Mainstream Jazz Album (1994 – 1999) ===
Year	Winner(s)	Album	Nominees	Ref.
1994	Dave Young and the Phil Dwyer Quartet	Fables and Dreams	Sonny Greenwich, Standard Idioms; Oliver Jones, Just BB; Rob McConnell and the Boss Brass, Our 25th Year; Bernie Senensky, Wheel Within a Wheel	
1995	Renee Rosnes	Free Trade	Jane Bunnett, The Water Is Wide; Ranee Lee, I Thought About You...; Lorne Lofsky, Bill, Please; Rob McConnell and the Boss Brass, Overtime	
1996	Ingrid Jensen	Vernal Fields	Jeri Brown, A Timeless Place; D.D. Jackson, Peace Song; Oliver Jones, From Lush to Lively; Normand Guilbeault Ensemble, Basso Continuo	
1997	Renee Rosnes	Ancestors	Lenny Breau with Dave Young, Live at Bourbon St.; Oscar Peterson, Oscar Peterson Meets Roy Hargrove and Ralph Moore; Rob McConnell and the Boss Brass, Even Canadians Get the Blues; Dave Young, Two by Two, Piano Bass Duets Vol II	
1998	Hugh Fraser Quintet	In the Mean Time	Ingrid Jensen, Here on Earth; Oliver Jones, Have Fingers, Will Travel; Diana Krall, Love Scenes; Renee Rosnes, As We Are Now	
1999	Kirk MacDonald	The Atlantic Sessions	François Bourassa, Cactus; Dave Young Trio, Inner Urge; The Kenny Wheeler, Sonny Greenwich Quintet, Kenny and Sonny Live at the Montreal Bistro; Kenny Wheeler, Norma Winstone, John Taylor and the Maritime Jazz Orchestra, Siren's Song	

=== Best Traditional Jazz Album – Instrumental (2000 – 2002) ===
Year	Winner(s)	Album	Nominees	Ref.
2000	Pat LaBarbera	Deep in a Dream	Bernie Senensky Quintet, New Horizons; P.J. Perry, P.J. Perry & The Edmonton Symphony Orchestra; Renee Rosnes, Art & Soul; Time Warp, Time Warp Plays the Music of Duke Ellington	
2001	Rob McConnell Tentet	Rob McConnell Tentet	Alive and Well, Way Out East; Ingrid Jensen, Higher Grounds; Kirk MacDonald, New Beginnings; Brad Turner, Brad Turner Quartet	
2002	Mike Murley, Ed Bickert and Steve Wallace	Live at the Senator	The Brigham Phillips Big Band, And It Really Was...; Campbell Ryga, Spectacular; Don Thompson, Forgotten Memories; Paul Tobey, Street Culture	

=== Traditional Jazz Album of the Year (2003 – 2014) ===
Year	Winner(s)	Album	Nominees	Ref.
2003	Renee Rosnes	Life on Earth	Jane Bunnett, Dewey Redman, Dean Bowman, Larry Cramer, Stanley Cowell, Kieran Overs and Mark McLean, Spirituals and Dedications; Oliver Jones and Skip Bey, Then and Now; Rob McConnell Tentet, Thank You, Ted; Bernard Primeau and the Montreal Jazz Ensemble, Evolution	
2004	Guido Basso	Lost in the Stars	Mike Murley and David Occhipinti, Duologue; One Take, One Take, Vol. 1; Sandro Dominelli Quintet, Café Varzé Jazz; John Stetch, Standards	
2005	David Braid	Vivid: The David Braid Sextet Live	Ryga/Rosnes Quartet, Deep Cove; François Théberge, Elenar; John Stetch, Exponentially Monk; The Mike Murley Quintet, Extra Time	
2006	Don Thompson Quartet	Ask Me Later	Ian McDougall Quintet, In a Sentimental Mood; Phil Dwyer with Alan Jones and Rodney Whitaker, Let Me Tell You About My Day; Dave Young Quintet, Mainly Mingus; P.J. Perry, Time Flies	
2007	Jon Ballantyne	Avenue Standard	Mike Murley and The David Braid Quartet, Mnemosyne's March; Jake Langley, Movin' and Groovin'; William Carn, Other Stories; David Braid, ZHEN: The David Braid Sextet Live, Volume II	
2008	Brandi Disterheft	Debut	David Braid and Matt Brubeck, Brubeck Braid: twotet/deuxtet; Tara Davidson, Code Breaking; Jodi Proznick Quartet, Foundations; Oliver Jones, PJ Perry, Ian MacDougall, Terry Clarke and Michel Donato, Live Jazz Legends	
2009	Oliver Jones	Second Time Around	Don Thompson Quartet, For Kenny Wheeler; Brad Turner Quartet, Small Wonder; Chris Donnelly, Solo; John Stetch, TV Trio	
2010	Terry Clarke	It's About Time	Alain Bédard, Bluesy Lunedi; Oliver Jones and Hank Jones, Pleased to Meet You; Al Henderson Septet, Regeneration; Darren Sigesmund, Strands II	
2011	John MacLeod's Rex Hotel Orchestra	Our First Set	Owen Howard, Drum Lore; Félix Stüssi 5 and Ray Anderson, Hieronymus; Earl MacDonald, Re: Visions, Works for Jazz Orchestra; Kirk MacDonald Quartet, Songbook Vol. 2	
2012	David Braid	Verge	Dave Young Quintet, Aspects of Oscar; Oliver Jones, Live in Baden; Kirk MacDonald Orchestra, Deep Shadows; Mike Murley Septet, Still Rollin'	
2013	Mike Murley, Ed Bickert and Steve Wallace	Test of Time	Shirantha Beddage, Identity; Brian Dickinson Quartet, Other Places; Cory Weeds Quartet, Up a Step; Dave Young/Terry Promane Octet, Volume One	
2014	Mike Downes	Ripple Effect	Carn Davidson 9, Nine; Ian McDougall 12-tet, The Ian McDougall 12tet LIVE; John MacLeod & His Rex Hotel Orchestra, Our Second Set; Phil Dwyer and Don Thompson, Look for the Silver Lining	
