= Occhipinti =

Occhipinti (Italian pronunciation: [ˌɔkkiˈpinti]; lit. 'Painted Eyes', i.e. 'Light Eyes') is a family name of Sicilian origin, originally from Palermo and Ragusa but now also widespread elsewhere.

Notable people with the name include:

- Alessio Occhipinti (born 1996), Italian swimmer
- Andrea Occhipinti (born 1957), Italian actor and producer
- Arianna Occhipinti (born 1982), Italian winemaker and winery owner
- Leonardo Occhipinti (born 1960), Italian former footballer
- Maria Occhipinti (1921–1996), Italian anarcha-feminist
- Michael Occhipinti, Canadian jazz guitarist and composer, founding member of the Neufeld-Occhipinti Jazz Orchestra
- Roberto Occhipinti (born 1955), Canadian jazz bassist and composer
- Paolo Occhipinti (born 1939), Italian singer and journalist

== See also ==
- Neufeld-Occhipinti Jazz Orchestra, Canadian jazz musical group
