= Bill McBirnie =

Bill McBirnie (musician)
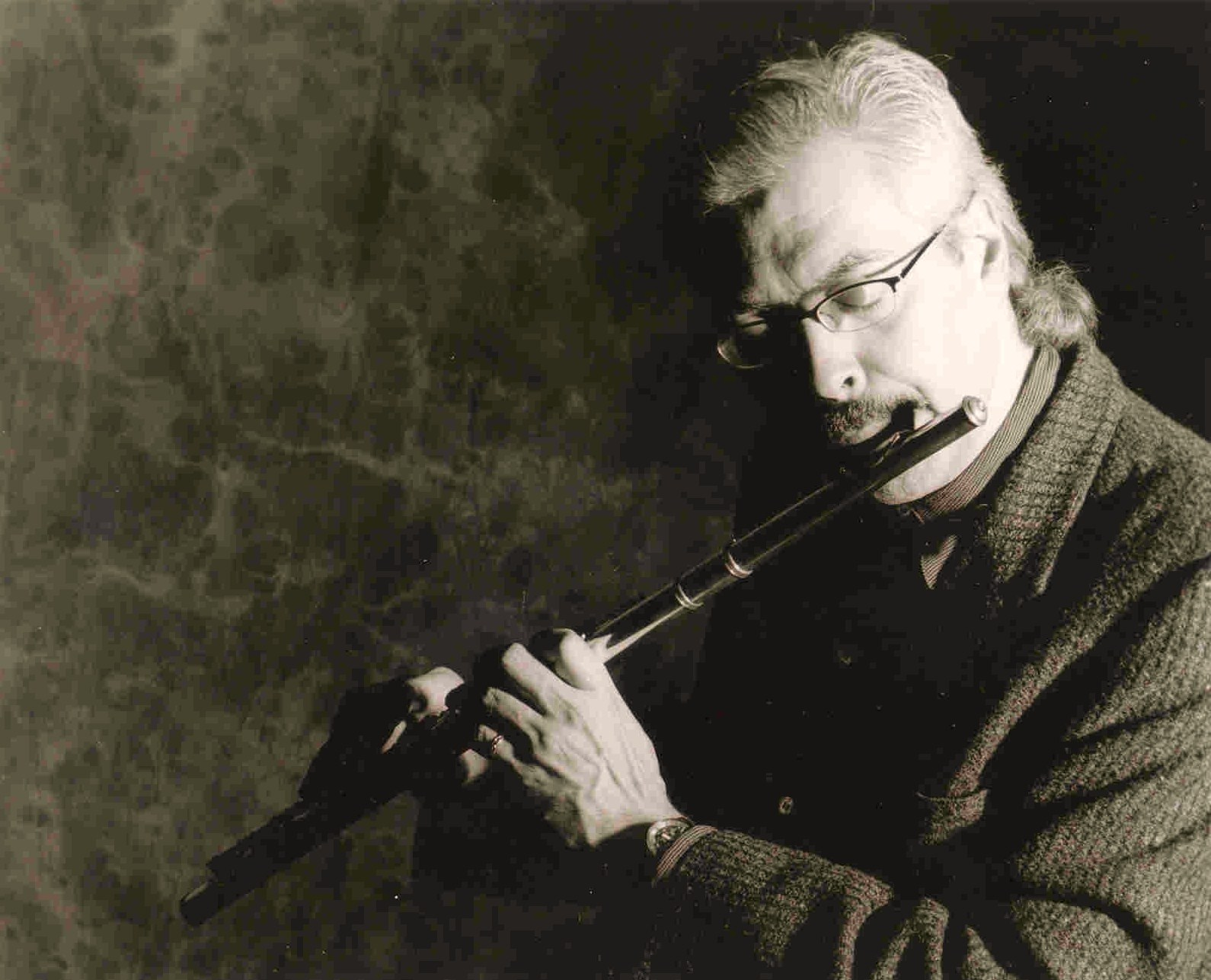

Background information
- Born: May 23, 1953 (age 73); Toronto, Ontario, Canada
- Genres: Jazz, Latin, Improvised
- Occupations: Musician, Author
- Instruments: Flute, Alto flute, Piccolo
- Website: extremeflute.com

Bill McBirnie is a Juno Award-nominated and world-renowned jazz/Latin flautist. He is based in Toronto, Ontario, Canada, but he was raised in the small town of Port Colborne, Ontario, Canada.

== Career ==
He studied with Canadian flautist and composer Robert Aitken, American classical flautist Samuel Baron, and Cuban charanga legend Richard Egües.

He has recorded several albums under his own name. He has also recorded extensively as a sideman, including albums with Junior Mance, Irakere, Four80East, Memo Acevedo, and Emilie-Claire Barlow.

In an educational vein, he was a longstanding contributor to the Woodwinds Column of the Canadian Musician magazine and, in addition, he was recruited personally by Sir James Galway to serve as his resident jazz flute specialist.

He is also author of two books, (1) The Technique and Theory of Improvisation: A practical guide for flutists, doublers, and other instrumentalists, and (2) Simplify Your Approach to Improvisation!: A practical 10-step guide for all instrumentalists.

== Awards and honors ==
The Silent Wish (with Bernie Senensky), was nominated for a Juno Award as Best Instrumental Album of the Year in 2020.

McBirnie was featured with Four80East in the #1 Billboard magazine Smooth Jazz hit, "Cinco Cinco Seis", in 2019. He was again featured by Four80East in the subsequent Billboard magazine hit, "Ba Ba Brazil", in 2020.

Find You Place won the Vox Pop award in the Jazz Instrumental category at the 14th Annual Independent Music Awards (IMAs) in the US in 2016.

Grain of Sand (with Bruce Jones) won the Best Instrumental album category at the Toronto Independent Music Awards in 2016.

The venerable American flute maker, William S. Haynes Flute Company, designated McBirnie a Haynes Artist in 2013.

Mercy (featuring Romani pianist, Robi Botos) was nominated in the Best Jazz Album category at the Independent Music Awards (IMAs) in the US in 2011.

Mercy (featuring Romani pianist, Robi Botos) also won in the Best Jazz Album category at the Toronto Independent Music Awards (TIMAs) in 2010.

McBirnie was named Flutist of the Year by the Jazz Report Awards in 1999, and nominated as both Miscellaneous Instrumentalist of the Year and Best Album for "Paco Paco" at the National Jazz Awards in 2007.

McBirnie was solicited personally by Sir James Galway to serve as the resident Jazz Flute Specialist at his official website in 2005.

He is the only flutist to have won all three of the US National Flute Association's jazz flute Masterclass (2003), Big Band (2009) and Soloist (2012) Competitions.

== Discography ==
=== As leader ===
- 1998 Desvio with Bruce Jones (Extreme Flute)
- 2002 Scratch It! (Extreme Flute)
- 2003 Nature Boy with Mark Eisenman (Extreme Flute)
- 2006 Paco Paco with Bernie Senensky (Extreme Flute)
- 2010 Mercy with Robi Botos (Extreme Flute)
- 2013 Find Your Place with Bernie Senensky (Extreme Flute)
- 2015 Grain of Sand with Bruce Jones (Extreme Flute)
- 2018 The Silent Wish with Bernie Senensky (Extreme Flute)
- 2021 Forever with Bruce Jones (Extreme Flute)
- 2024 Reflections (for Paul Horn) (Extreme Flute)

=== As sideman ===
- 1992 Here 'Tis, Junior Mance, (Sackville Records)
- 1994 Building Bridges, Memo Acevedo
- 1995 Grey Angel, Jacek Kochan
- 1996 Afrocubanismo Live!, Chucho Valdés
- 2004 Blended, Caché
- 2006 Toronto Sessions, Caché
- 2006 I Love Being Here with You, Dione Taylor
- 2007 The Very Thought of You, Emilie-Claire Barlow
- 2010 The Beat Goes On, Emilie-Claire Barlow
- 2011 To Brazil With Love, Diana Panton
- 2011 Looking From The Top, Caché
- 2012 Off Duty, Four80East
- 2018 Muse, The Tiki Collective (produced by Jaymz Bee)
- 2018 Four on the Floor, Four80East
- 2020 Straight Round, Four80East
- 2021 Light Through Dark, Gilliam, Martynec, McBirnie (with Bill Gilliam and Eugene Martynec)
- 2022 Lou Pomanti & Friends, with Irene Torres
- 2022 Conpambiche, with Junior Santos
- 2023 Spark Bird, Emilie-Claire Barlow
- 2023 Night and Day - The Cole Porter Songbook, Adi Braun
- 2023 Outside The Maze, Gilliam, Martynec, McBirnie (with Bill Gilliam and Eugene Martynec)
- 2025 The Barn Sessions - Volume 1, Four80East
- 2025 Haunted Melody, Peter Campbell
