= Metalwood (album) =

Studio album by Metalwood
- Released: 1997
- Genre: Jazz Fusion
- Length: 69:44
- Producer: Metalwood

Metalwood chronology
Metalwood (1997)	Metalwood 2 (1998)

Metalwood is the first album by Canadian jazz fusion band Metalwood. It won the Juno Award for best contemporary jazz album.

== Track listing ==
1. "5 Minute Margin" (Turner) - 11:20
2. "Mr. Jack" (Tarry) - 8:13
3. "New Congregation" (Turner) - 6:29
4. "Not Disappointed" (Metalwood) - 3:00
5. "Lateral" (Turner) - 7:10
6. "Crunchman" (Metalwood) - 5:36
7. "Hey, Longhair!" (Tarry) - 5:01
8. "And Loving It" (Metalwood) - 5:06
9. "Square" (Murley) - 7:06
10. "Big Delivery" (Metalwood) - 7:41
11. "T & LC" (Metalwood) - 3:25

== Personnel ==
- Mike Murley - tenor & soprano saxes
- Brad Turner - trumpet, keyboards
- Chris Tarry - bass
- Ian Froman - drums
