= Phil Dwyer (musician) =

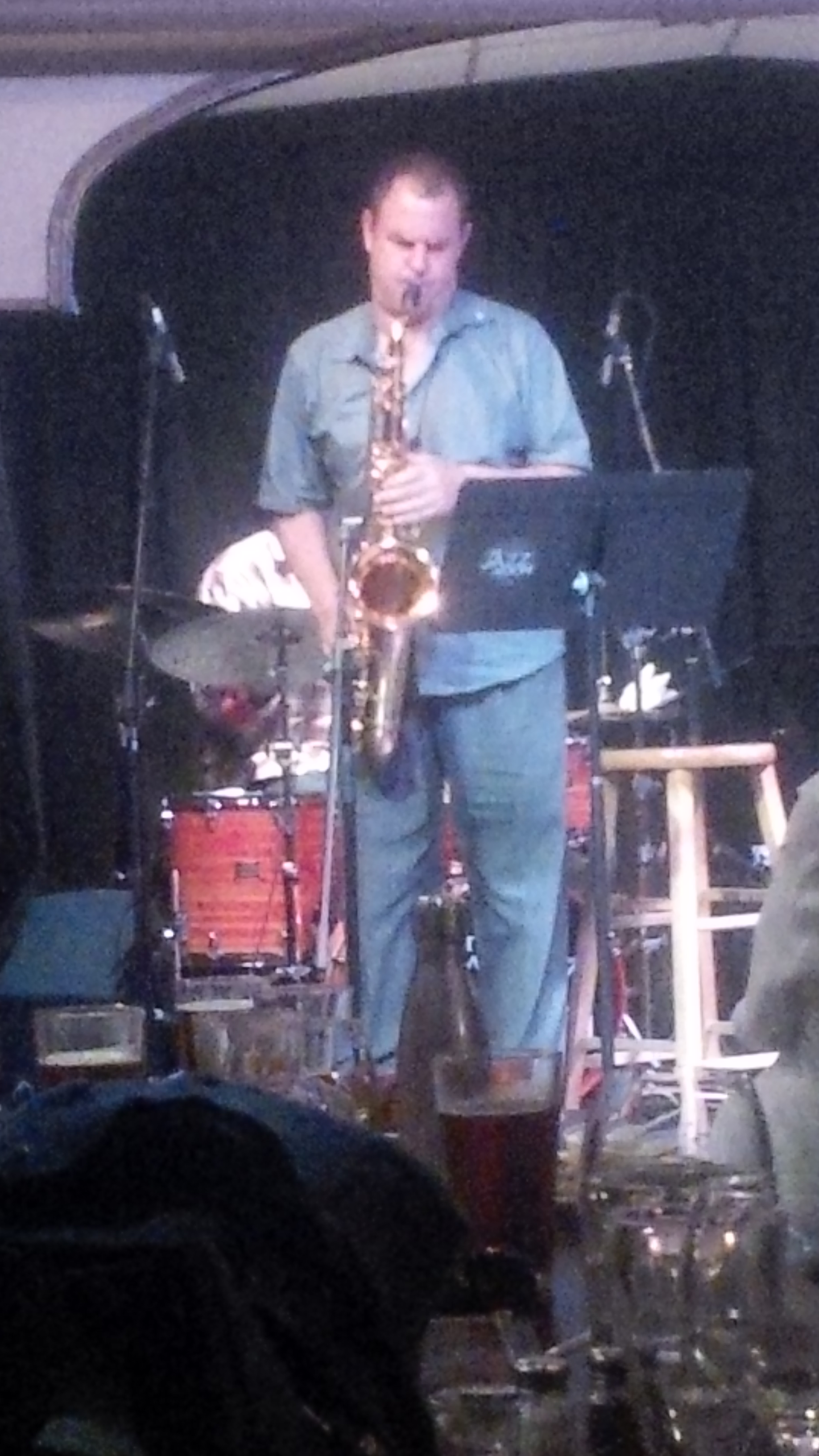

Background information
- Born: Philip Richard Dwyer; December 17, 1965 (age 60); Duncan, British Columbia, Canada
- Genres: Jazz, Classical
- Instruments: Tenor sax, alto sax, soprano sax, flute, piano
- Website: Official website

Phil Dwyer CM is a Canadian jazz saxophonist, pianist, composer, producer and educator. In 2017 he graduated from the University of New Brunswick (UNB) Faculty of Law in Fredericton, New Brunswick and was called to the bar of British Columbia in 2018. Dwyer is Member of the Order of Canada, having been invested in 2013 "For his contributions to jazz as a performer, composer and producer, and for increasing access to music education in his community." Dwyer has been nominated for Juno Awards six times and won Best Mainstream Jazz Album in 1994 with Dave Young for Fables and Dreams and Contemporary Jazz Album of the Year in 2012 for the recording Changing Seasons. Dwyer has also appeared on Juno Award winning recordings with Hugh Fraser (1988), Joe Sealy (1997), Natalie MacMaster (2000), Guido Basso (2004), Don Thompson (2006), Molly Johnson (2009), Terry Clarke (2010), and Diana Panton (2015). He is an alumnus and Honorary Fellow of The Royal Conservatory of Music.

== Biography ==
Dwyer was born December 17, 1965, in Duncan, British Columbia, and went to high school in Parksville, and Qualicum Beach, British Columbia.

Dwyer’s first national press exposure came from journalist Mark Miller, who profiled Dwyer in a piece filed for The Globe and Mail in 1982 from the Canadian Stage Band Festival (precursor to MusicFest Canada), held that year in Hamilton, Ontario. Dwyer performed with his Ballenas Secondary School group Triple Image and took the Gold Medal in the combo category.

Dwyer joined the American Federation of Musicians, Local 145 in 1983 at age 17 to perform with Fred Stride's West Coast Jazz Orchestra, 'subbing' for well-known Vancouver saxophonist/flautist Tom Keenlyside. A recording of his first Vancouver performance as a bandleader led to his receiving a Canada Council grant in 1983 to study in New York with David Liebman, which led in turn to studies with Steve Grossman. Earlier teachers included saxophonists Steve Jones and David Branter, pianist Don Thompson, piano/theory teacher Joan Gosselin, and high school band director Bill Cave. His high school contemporaries included trumpeter Ingrid Jensen, bassist Pat Collins, and singer/pianist Diana Krall, for whom years later Dwyer would compose the tribute song 'Diana Piana'.

In 1985, Dwyer returned to Canada to stay, stopping in Edmonton on his way to Vancouver to perform the Hugh Fraser’s VEJI band, and guitarist Oliver Gannon’s Quartet, at the Edmonton Jazz City Festival. From 1985 through 1988, Dwyer was based in Vancouver, where he worked as a freelance musician, was a member of VEJI and the Hugh Fraser Quintet, and traveled south to work with bassist David Friesen’s Trio (with drummer Alan Jones). Among his earlier recordings were the Juno-winning Looking Up (Hugh Fraser Quintet), Classic VEJI, and Friesen’s Other Times, Other Places. Reviewers, including journalist Scott Yanow, highlighted Dwyer’s contributions to Friesen’s recording in particular.

In 1988, Dwyer relocated to Toronto and established a freelance performing and recording career, as well as joining the music faculty at York University. He was a frequent performer at Toronto jazz clubs such as the Top o' the Senator, Montréal Bistro, George's Spaghetti House, the Pilot Tavern, and the Rex Jazz Bar. He also appeared at concert venues such as Massey Hall, Roy Thompson Hall, the O'Keefe Centre, and others. Among the artists with whom Dwyer appeared are Kenny Wheeler, Aretha Franklin, Rodney Whitaker, the Toronto Symphony Orchestra, Esprit Orchestra, Holly Cole, Tom Harrell, Renee Rosnes, and many others. During the time he lived in Toronto, he also toured frequently across Canada, in the U.S., South America, Europe, and Asia, appearing at various clubs and festivals with different Canadian-based groups and in 1995 with Gino Vannelli. From the early 1990s until 2004, Dwyer was a fixture in the Toronto recording studios, appearing on many albums, radio shows, and commercials. Some of his most frequent collaborators included Doug Riley, Don Thompson, Roberto Occhipinti, Molly Johnson, Guido Basso, John Johnson, Manteca, and Tim Tickner. He also wrote commercial music for production companies Rosnick/McKinnon, Einstein Bros., Pirate, and others.

In 1999-2000, Dwyer studied composition with Michael Colgrass, which led to him writing music by the commission for the Amici Ensemble, Patricia O'Callaghan, Art Of Time, Gryphon Trio, Mark Fewer, CBC Orchestra, Kate Alton (choreographer), and several CBC Radio projects.

In 2004, Dwyer relocated to Qualicum Beach, on his native Vancouver Island. He continued to tour, write and record prolifically, including recordings with Terri Lyne Carrington, Terry Clarke, Joey Defrancesco, Don Thompson, Molly Johnson, Ian McDougall, Phil Dwyer Orchestra, Jon McCaslin, Melinda Whitaker, Norman Foote, David Gogo, and the Bridge Quartet. He also founded and operated the Phil Dwyer Academy of Musical and Culinary Arts (PDAMCA).

In 2013, he was made a Member of the Order of Canada "for his contributions to jazz as a performer, composer, and producer, and for increasing access to music education in his community".

== Other activities ==
Dwyer is a founding partner of Seawind Musical Instruments Inc., manufacturer of the Phil Dwyer Edition line of saxophones as well as other musical instruments and accessories.

In 2014, Dwyer was admitted to the University of New Brunswick law school, graduated in 2017, and was called to the bar in British Columbia in 2018. Dwyer currently practices law in Qualicum Beach, B.C., running his own firm, Phil Dwyer Law. He was motivated to pursue a legal career due to his long-standing interests in a number of social justice, environmental, and political issues.

== Discography ==
=== As leader or co-leader ===
- 1993 Fables and Dreams, Dave Young-Phil Dwyer Quartet (Justin Time)
- 2001 We Three with Dave Young, Michael Lambert (Toronto Sound)
- 2005 Let Me Tell You About My Day with Alan Jones and Rodney Whitaker (Alma)
- 2010 One Take: Volume 4 with Vito Rezza, Joey DeFrancesco, Robi Botos (Alma)
- 2011 Changing Seasons (Alma)
- 2013 Look for the Silver Lining with Don Thompson (Triplet)
- 2021 Audi Alteram Partem with Ben Dwyer, Mark Adam (Chronograph)

With Bridge Quartet

- 2008 Day
- 2009 Night

With Manteca

- Later is Now! (Justin Time)
- 1996 No Net

With Don Thompson

- 2006 Ask Me Later
- 1991 Forgotten Memories (Roadhouse)
- 2008 For Kenny Wheeler (Sackville)

With Ian McDougall

- 2007 No Passport Required (Ian McDougall Big Band)
- 2012 "Live" (Ian McDougall 12-tet)

With Alain Caron

- 1993 Le Band
- 1997 Play

With Rita Chiarelli

- 1994 Just Gettin' Started (Stony Plain)
- 2001 Breakfast at Midnight

With Hugh Fraser

- 1988 Looking Up (CBC)
- 1989 Pas de Problems (CBC)

With Diana Panton

- 2013 Red
- 2017 Solstice/Equinox

With others

- 1995 Temptation, Holly Cole (Capitol)
- 1998 One 2 One, Brian Hughes (Higher Octave)
- 1999 In My Hands, Natalie MacMaster (Rounder)
- 1999 This Is How Men Cry, Marc Jordan
- 2001 Real Emotional Girl, Patricia O'Callaghan
- 2001 Tell You How I Feel, Michael Kaeshammer (Alma)
- 2001 Apartment Hunting, Mary Margaret O'Hara
- 2005 One Take: Volume 2 with Marc Rogers, Robi Botos, and Terri Lynne Carrington (Alma)
- 2006 On a Whim: Songs of Ron Sexsmith, John McDermott
- 2007 From Sea to Sky, Laila Biali (CBC)
- 2008 Lucky, Molly Johnson (Verve)
- 2009 Different Views, David Gogo
- 2009 It's About Time, Terry Clarke (Blue Music Group)
- 2018 Four On The Floor (ep), Four80East
