= Vivid: The David Braid Sextet Live =

Live album by David Braid
- Released: 2004
- Recorded: March 2003 at The Top o' the Senator, Toronto
- Genre: Jazz
- Length: 1:12:48

Vivid: The David Braid Sextet Live is the second album by Canadian jazz pianist and composer, David Braid, as well as the second album to feature the group the David Braid Sextet. It was recorded live at Toronto club Top o' the Senator in 2003.

It won the Juno Award for Traditional Jazz Album of the Year in 2005.

== Track listing ==
- All pieces composed and arranged by David Braid
1. "Reverence" 7:06
2. "Seraphim" 10:56
3. "Mister Wallace" 8:54
4. "The Golden Years" 8:11
5. "The Music Room" 5:30
6. "The Call" 8:29
7. "For JM" 9:31
8. "What Is This?" 14:44

== Personnel ==
- David Braid – piano
- Mike Murley – saxophone
- John McLeod – flugelhorn
- Gene Smith – trombone
- Steve Wallace – bass
- Terry Clarke – drums
