= George Evans (singer) =

Canadian jazz singer (born 1963)

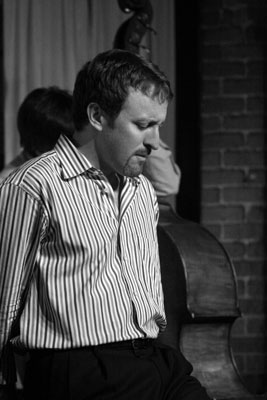

Background information
- Born: George Louis Henry Evans; January 23, 1963 (age 63); Bloomington, Indiana, U.S.
- Genres: Jazz
- Occupation: Singer
- Years active: 1990s–present
- Label: M-Swing

George Louis Henry Evans (born January 23, 1963) is a Canadian jazz singer.

== Early life ==
Born in Bloomington, Indiana and raised in Cincinnati, Ohio, Evans is the child of Robert Evans (an American) and Lucile Villeneuve Evans (a French-Canadian), both longtime faculty of the University of Cincinnati College-Conservatory of Music (CCM), Indiana University School of Music (opera department), and McGill University in Montreal. This early exposure to music inspired him to have a career in music, while his sister, Julie Evans, became an architect in Chicago and New York City.

Evans attended the School for Creative and Performing Arts in the Cincinnati Public Schools, where he majored in musical theater and instrumental music (trombone), and went on to study Musical Theater at the University of Cincinnati College-Conservatory of Music. He moved to New York City and in the 1980s worked toward a career in theater while appearing as a vocalist. He chose a career as a vocalist, broadcaster, producer and archivist.

== Career ==
Performing as a soloist in the late 1980s in cabarets in New York City at venues such as Eighty-Eight's and Danny's Skylight Room, Evans went on to study and perform in the Montreal. He was heard on Montreal radio on CKUT and K103, and for the better part of a decade appeared in clubs and festivals before moving to Toronto in 1999.

Working as a musicologist, Evans has been hired to select and sequence projects for Verve Records in the US, including much of "The Diva Series", focusing on Verve's best-selling female singers. In 2004 he created Here Come The Boys: a Canadian Crooner Collection for Maximum Jazz and Universal Music Canada. His discography includes the album Bewitched, his first recording with strings, and Live at the Cellar, recorded in the Vancouver night club.

== Awards and honors ==
Evans was nominated the Canadian National Jazz Awards Vocalist of the Year (2003) and Male Vocalist of the Year (2007, 2008, 2009). He has performed across Canada in festivals including the Vancouver International Jazz Festival, Montreal International Jazz Festival and Toronto Downtown Jazz Festival. He has performed at Top o' the Senator and the Montreal Bistro in Toronto, The Cellar in Vancouver, and Upstairs in Montreal. He has performed in clubs and cabarets New York City such as The Metropolitan Room and the Laurie Beechman Theater. In 2008 Evans was nominated with vocalist Mary Foster Conklin for a MAC Award in the category of best jazz duo or group. Evans's column "Vocalizing In Jazz" was a regular feature of Planet Jazz magazine. In 2009 he produced a series entitled "The Jazz Standard" for Jazz.fm in Toronto.

== Discography ==
- Moodswing (M-Swing, 1997)
- I'm All Smiles (M-Swing, 1999)
- From Moment to Moment (M-Swing, 2001)
- Eyes for You M-Swing, 2002)
- Movie Songs (Maximum Jazz, 2004)
- Bewitched (M-Swing, 2006)
- Live at the Cellar (M-Swing, 2008)

== Production discography ==
- Alex Pangman - Live in Montreal (Real Gone Gal) liner notes - 2005
- Here Come The Boys: a Canadian Crooner Collection (MAX-15602) producer - 2004
- Diva Series - Anita O'Day (Verve) selection and sequencing - 2003
- Diva Series - Ella Fitzgerald (Verve) selection and sequencing - 2003
- Diva Series - Astrud Gilberto (Verve) selection and sequencing - 2003
- Diva Series - Billie Holiday (Verve) selection and sequencing - 2003
- Diva Series - Dinah Washington (Verve) selection and sequencing - 2003
- Diva Series - Sarah Vaughan (Verve) selection and sequencing - 2003
- Diva Series - Carmen McRae (Verve) selection and sequencing - 2003
- Buddy Greco - Talkin' Verve (Verve) selection and sequencing - 2001
