= Streetniks =

Studio album by The Shuffle Demons
- Released: 1986
- Genre: Jazz/Post-Bop
- Label: Stubby Records

The Shuffle Demons chronology
Streetniks (1986)	Bop Rap (1988)

Streetniks is an album by The Shuffle Demons, recorded over two days. Streetniks sold 15,000 units in Canada, becoming the bestselling independent release in Canadian music history, until Barenaked Ladies broke the record in 1991 with The Yellow Tape.

"Spadina Bus", an ode to the Toronto Transit Commission's Spadina Avenue bus line, was a surprise Top 40 hit for the band. The music video for the track "Out of My House, Roach" also received regular airplay on MuchMusic during the late 1980s.

== Track listing ==
1. The Shuffle Monster (Underhill) – 6:45
2. Spadina Bus (Parker/Underhill/Wynston/Murley) – 4:35
3. Gabi's Gimi Suit (Underhill/Wynston/Murley) – 7:26
4. Out of My House, Roach (Parker) – 5:35
5. Vitamin K (In Honor of Keith's India Pale Ale) (Parker) – 4:10
6. The Puker (Turrin/Patry/Underhill) – 5:06
7. Bag Rot (Murley) – 9:48
8. Amsterdam Strut (Underhill) – 6:04
9. Big Daddy, Fat Boy (Underhill) – 7:35
10. Pie in the Sky (Underhill/Wynston/White/Milligan/Parker/Saar) – 10:45
11. Low Life (Underhill) – 0:43

== Personnel ==
- Demon Richard Underhill - alto & baritone saxes, lukophone, vocals, shouts
- Demon Mike Murley - tenor, baritone & alto saxes, vocals, handclaps
- Demon Dave Parker - tenor sax, flute, vocals, handclaps, roach stomps
- Demon Jim Vivian - bass, vocals, handclaps
- Demon Stich Wynston - drums, gongs, bells, windchimes, triangle, goat nails castanets, vocals, handclaps, dancing
- Demon Perry White - tenor sax (Amsterdam Strut & Pie in the Sky)
- Demon Mike Milligan - bass (Pie in the Sky)
- Demon Oliver Saar - alto sax (Pie in the Sky)
- Demon Gene Hardy - tenor sax (Pie in the Sky)
- Demon Markus - Digeridoo (Pie in the Sky)
