= Capriccio discography =

This is a partial discography of Capriccio, Richard Strauss's opera from 1942. Capriccio: A Conversation Piece for Music is his final opera.

== Recordings ==
Year	Cast (Countess, Count, Flamand, Olivier, La Roche, Clairon)	Conductor, Opera house and orchestra	Label
1942	Viorica Ursuleac; Karl Schmitt-Walter; Rudolf Schock; Hans Braun; Hans Hotter; Hertha Töpper	Clemens Krauss; Bavarian Radio Symphony Orchestra	Opera Depot; Cat:
1957–1958	Elisabeth Schwarzkopf; Eberhard Wächter; Nicolai Gedda; Dietrich Fischer-Dieskau; Hans Hotter; Christa Ludwig	Wolfgang Sawallisch; Philharmonia Orchestra	EMI Classics; Cat:
1960	Elisabeth Schwarzkopf; Hermann Uhde; Anton Dermota; Walter Berry; Paul Schöffler; Christel Goltz	Karl Böhm; Vienna State Opera orchestra and chorus	Omega Opera Archive; Cat:
1964	Lisa Della Casa; Robert Kerns; Waldemar Kmentt; Walter Berry; Otto Wiener; Christa Ludwig	Georges Prêtre; Vienna State Opera orchestra and chorus	Omega Opera Archive; Cat:
1971	Gundula Janowitz; Dietrich Fischer-Dieskau; Peter Schreier; Hermann Prey; Karl Ridderbusch; Tatiana Troyanos	Karl Böhm; Bavarian Radio Symphony orchestra	Deutsche Grammophon; Cat:
1983	Gundula Janowitz; Hans Helm; Peter Schreier; Gottfried Hornik; Theo Adam; Christa Ludwig	Heinrich Hollreiser; Vienna State Opera orchestra and chorus	Lyric Distribution; Cat:
1993	Kiri Te Kanawa; Håkan Hagegård; David Kuebler; Simon Keenlyside; Victor Braun; Tatiana Troyanos	Donald Runnicles; San Francisco Opera orchestra and chorus	Kultur Video; Cat:
1994	Kiri Te Kanawa; Håkan Hagegård; Uwe Heilmann; Olaf Bär; Victor von Halem; Brigitte Fassbaender	Ulf Schirmer; Vienna Philharmonic	Decca Records; Cat:
1999	Felicity Lott; Thomas Allen; Gregory Kunde; Stephan Genz; Günter Von Kannen; Iris Vermillion	Georges Prêtre; Stuttgart Radio Symphony Orchestra	Forlane; Cat:
2004	Renée Fleming; Dietrich Henschel; Rainer Trost; Gerald Finley; Franz Hawlata; Anne Sofie von Otter	Ulf Schirmer; Paris Opera orchestra and chorus	TDK; Cat:
2011	Renée Fleming; Morten Frank Larsen; Joseph Kaiser; Russell Braun; Peter Rose; Sarah Connolly	Andrew Davis; Metropolitan Opera orchestra and chorus	The Met; Cat:
