= List of awards and nominations received by Diana Krall =

Diana Krall awards and nominations
Awards and nominations
Award	Wins	Nominations
Echo	0	3
Grammy	2	9
MOBO	0	1
Soul Train	0	1
Western Canadian Music Awards	1	2
SOCAN Awards	1	1
National Smooth Jazz Awards	3	3
National Jazz Awards	3	3
Juno Awards	8	12
Canadian Smooth Jazz Awards	3	3

Totals (Note: Certain award groups do not simply award one winner. They acknowledge several different recipients, have runners-up, and have third place. Since this is a specific recognition and is different from losing an award, runner-up mentions are considered wins in this award tally. For simplification and to avoid errors, each award in this list has been presumed to have had a prior nomination.)
- Wins: 24
- Nominations: 50

Diana Krall is a Canadian singer-songwriter and pianist. This is list of awards and nominations for Diana and Works. Overall, Krall has won 24 awards from 50 nominations.

== Billboard Japan Music Awards ==
Year	Nominee / work	Award	Result	Ref.
2015	Wallflower	Jazz Album of the Year	Won	

== Canadian Smooth Jazz Awards ==
Year	Nominee / work	Award	Result
2005	Diana Krall	Female Vocalist of the Year	Won
2005	"Narrow Daylight"	Songwriter of the Year	Won
2005	The Girl in the Other Room	Album of the Year	Won

== Echo Awards ==
The ECHO Awards are an annual music award ceremony. Winners are determined by the previous year's sales. Krall three nominations.

Year	Nominee / work	Award	Result
2006	Christmas Songs	National/International Jazz Production of the Year	Nominated
2007	From This Moment On	National/International Jazz Production of the Year	Nominated
2008	The Very Best of Diana Krall	National/International Jazz Production of the Year	Nominated

== Grammy Awards ==
The Grammy Awards are awarded annually by the National Academy of Recording Arts and Sciences. Krall has won two awards from nine nominations.

Year	Nominee / work	Award	Result
1996	All for You: A Dedication to the Nat King Cole Trio	Best Jazz Vocal Album	Nominated
1997	Love Scenes	Best Jazz Vocal Album	Nominated
2000	When I Look in Your Eyes	Album of the Year	Nominated
2000	When I Look in Your Eyes	Best Jazz Vocal Album	Won
2002	"Better Than Anything" with Natalie Cole	Best Pop Collaboration with Vocals	Nominated
2003	Live in Paris	Best Jazz Vocal Album	Won
2007	From This Moment On	Best Jazz Vocal Album	Nominated
2019	Love Is Here to Stay with Tony Bennett	Best Traditional Pop Vocal Album	Nominated
2019	"'S Wonderful" with Tony Bennett	Best Pop Duo/Group Performance	Nominated

== Juno Awards ==
The Juno Awards is a Canadian awards ceremony presented annually by the Canadian Academy of Recording Arts and Sciences. Krall has received eight awards and twenty one nominations.

Year	Nominee / work	Award	Result
1998	Love Scenes	Best Mainstream Jazz Album	Nominated
2000	When I Look In Your Eyes	Best Vocal Jazz Album	Won
2002	Diana Krall	Best Artist	Won
2002	The Look of Love	Best Vocal Jazz Album	Won
2002	The Look of Love	Best Album	Won
2003	Diana Krall	Fan Choice	Nominated
2003	Live in Paris	Vocal Jazz Album of the Year	Won
2005	Diana Krall	Artist of the Year	Nominated
2005	Diana Krall	Fan Choice	Nominated
2005	The Girl in the Other Room	Album of the Year	Nominated
2005	The Girl in the Other Room	Vocal Jazz Album of the Year	Won
2006	Diana Krall	Artist of the Year	Nominated
2006	Diana Krall	Fan Choice	Nominated
2006	Christmas Songs	Album of the Year	Nominated
2006	Christmas Songs	Vocal Jazz Album of the Year	Won
2006	Live At The Montréal Jazz Festival	Music DVD of the Year	Nominated
2007	Diana Krall	Artist of the Year	Nominated
2007	From This Moment On	Vocal Jazz Album of the Year	Won
2010	Diana Krall	Artist of the Year	Nominated
2010	Quiet Nights	Album of the Year	Nominated
2010	Quiet Nights	Vocal Jazz Album of the Year	Nominated

== MOBO Awards ==
The MOBO Awards (an acronym for Music of Black Origin) were established in 1996 by Kanya King. They are held annually in the United Kingdom to recognize artists of any race or nationality performing music of black origin. Krall has one nominated.

Year	Nominee / work	Award	Result
2009	Diana Krall	Best Jazz Act	Nominated

== National Jazz Awards ==
The National Jazz Awards, presented by Galaxie, CBC's Continuous Music Network, Slaight Communications and generously supported by FACTOR, has confirmed that the hosts of this year's National Jazz Awards are Tim Tamashiro, an artist in his own right and weekend host of CBC Radio's Tonic and Karen Gordon, a modern-day renaissance woman – in demand as writer, radio host, film reviewer and media trainer but probably first and foremost a music lover.

Year	Nominee / work	Award	Result
2004	Diana Krall	International Musician of the Year	Won
2007	Diana Krall	International Musician of the Year	Won
2007	Diana Krall	Female Vocalist of the Year	Won

== National Smooth Jazz Awards ==
The Oasis Contemporary Jazz Awards (Oasis Music Awards) are presented annually to recognize achievement in the Smooth Jazz Music format as well as Jazz Fusion and other sectors of the Contemporary Jazz genre. The award categories are similar in nature to the Grammys, American Music Awards, Country Music Association Awards, etc. Awards are given for Song of the Year, CD of the Year, Male and Female Artist of the Year, etc. Also, an award is presented to the player of the year on sax, piano, drums, bass, guitar, etc.

Year	Nominee / work	Award	Result
2003	Diana Krall	Vocalist of the Year	Won
2003	Diana Krall	Female Artist of the Year	Won
2003	"The Look of Love"	Vocal Song of the Year	Won

== SOCAN Awards ==
The SOCAN (the Society of Composers, Authors and Music Publishers of Canada) is the Canadian copyright collective for the right to communicate to the public and publicly perform musical works. SOCAN administers these rights on behalf of its members (composers, lyricists, songwriters, and their publishers) and those of affiliated international organizations by licensing the use of their music in Canada.

Year	Nominee / work	Award	Result
2005	Diana Krall	Hagood Hardy Jazz Music Award	Won

== Soul Train Lady of Soul Award ==
The Soul Train Lady of Soul Awards is an awards show that honors the accomplishments of women in the music industry. Krall has been nominated once.

Year	Nominee / work	Award	Result
1998	All For You (A Dedication to the Nat King Cole Trio)	Best Jazz Album	Nominated

== Western Canadian Music Awards ==
The Western Canadian Music Awards (WCMAs) is an annual awards ceremony for music in the western portion of Canada, that originated in its current form in 2003.

Year	Nominee / work	Award	Result
2005	The Girl in the Other Room	Outstanding Album (Major Label)	Won
2005	The Girl in the Other Room	Outstanding Jazz Recording	Nominated
2005	Diana Krall	Entertainer of the Year	Nominated
