= Graeme Kirkland =

Canadian musician

Graeme Kirkland is a Canadian record producer, composer, musician, and performance artist active during the late 1980s and 1990s.

== Musical career ==
At age 15, while too young to be formally enrolled, Kirkland studied music in advanced classes at York University. During his teen years, he received three full scholarships to The Banff Centre School of Fine Arts studying and working alongside Big Miller, John Abercrombie, Kenny Wheeler, Don Thompson, Dave Holland, Hugh Fraser, and Albert Mangelsdorff. He also studied privately in Toronto & New York City. son During his musical career, Kirkland played alongside and recorded with the Leslie Spit Treeo, Boo Watson, Varga, Jeff Healey, Ashley MacIsaac, Tim Brady, Holly Cole, Mark Feldman, John Zorn, George Koller, Fred Stone, Jane Bunnett, Bob Wiseman, John Gzowski, The Shuffle Demons, Joey Goldstein, as well as the National Ballet of Canada. Kirkland, together with Tom Walsh, composed and played for the Hemispheres Orchestra in 1988. His music was featured on Citytv, MuchMusic, and in the movie Roadkill, which won an award at the 1989 Toronto International Film Festival.

Albums produced by Kirkland include There's No Such Word As Can't, Sleep Alone, and Sing Along With Graeme, which featured famous musicians Mary Margaret O'Hara, and Jim Cuddy from Blue Rodeo. Along with being a respected studio drummer, Kirkland was well known for his street busking performances, using overturned buckets and other available surfaces. He organized his annual Santa's Jolly Christmas Benefit show, as well as the urban-drumming show Graeme Kirkland's Long Distance Canada Day event in Toronto. After his musical career, he became a financial advisor.

== Awards ==
Kirkland was a popular performer in Toronto being voted "Best Drummer" by NOW magazine's readers consecutively for 6 years (1996–2001) in their annual Reader's Poll. The runner-up in each of these 6 years was Neil Peart of Rush.

== Discography ==
=== Albums ===
Year	Album	Artist
1988	There's No Such Word As Can't	Graeme Kirkland and The Wolves
1989	Sleep Alone!	Graeme Kirkland and The Wolves
1990	Don't Cry Too Hard	The Leslie Spit Treeo
1993	Compositional Collage	Graeme Kirkland and The Wolves
1996	Sing Along with Graeme	Graeme Kirkland
1996	Oxygen	Varga
1996	Hi How Are You Today?	Ashley MacIsaac
1999	Beat Truths	Graeme Kirkland
