= Vetro =

Vetro means glass in Italian, and may refer to:

== People ==
- Dominic Vetro (born 1958), Canadian football player
- Harry Vetro (born 1995), Canadian drummer

== Other ==
- Vetro Energy
