= Senensky =

Senensky is a surname. Notable people with the surname include:

- Bernie Senensky (born 1944), Canadian jazz pianist, organist, and composer
- Ralph Senensky (1923–2025), American television director and screenwriter
