= The Shuffle Demons =

Canadian jazz fusion band

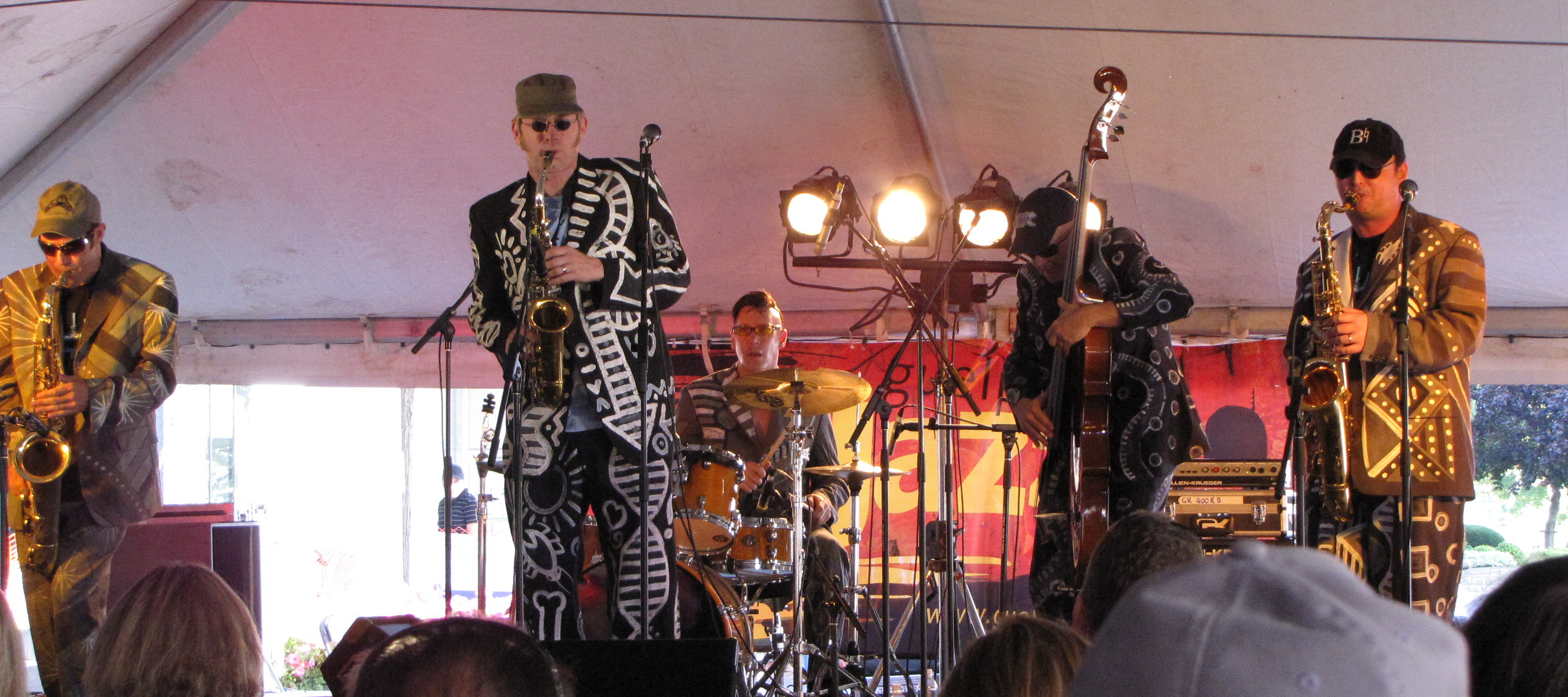
- Shuffle Demons in concert at the Guelph Jazz Festival. Left to right: Perry White, Richard Underhill, Stich Wynston, George Koller, Kelly Jefferson

Background information
- Origin: Toronto, Ontario, Canada
- Genres: Jazz fusion, Pop, Jazz rap
- Years active: 1984–1997, 2004–present
- Label: Verve
- Members: Richard Underhill; Dave Parker; Stich Wynston; George Koller; Perry White; Kelly Jefferson; Matt Lagan; Mike Downes; Steve Carson
- Past members: Mike Murley; Jim Vivian; Eric St. Laurent; Greg Smith
- Website: shuffledemons.com

The Shuffle Demons are a Canadian jazz fusion band from Toronto.

== Early career ==
The band were formed in 1984 by saxophonist Richard Underhill in collaboration with a variety of Toronto-area jazz musicians including Mike Murley, Dave Parker and Stich Wynston. They performed as buskers in the Toronto area before recording the full-length album Streetniks, which was released in 1986.

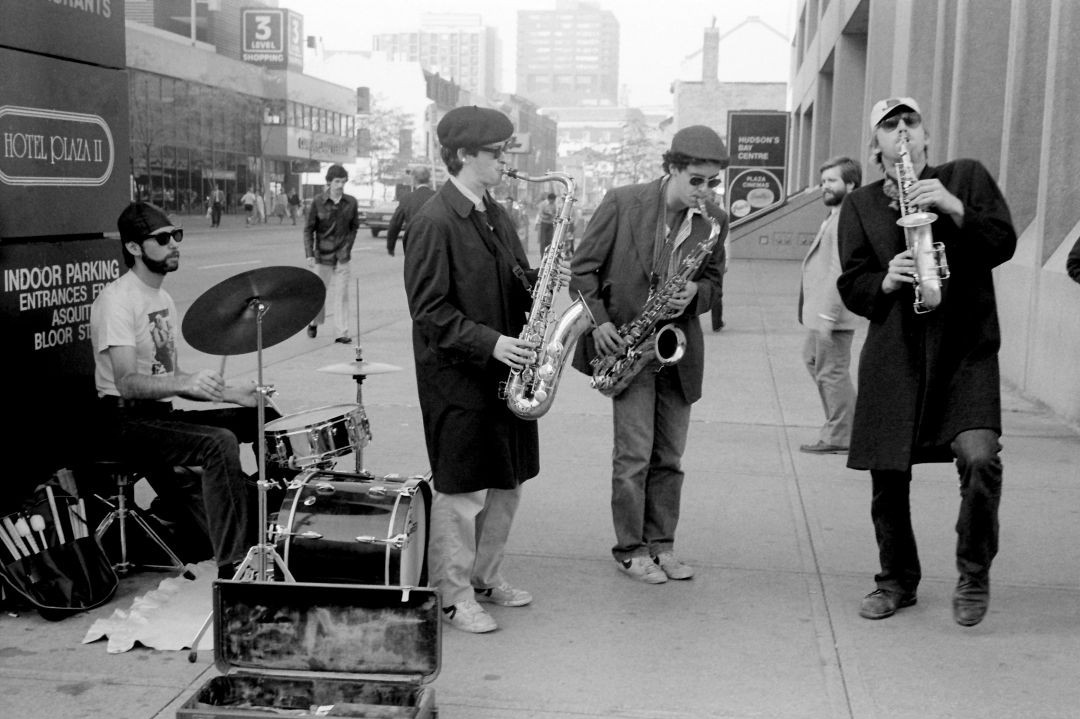
The Shuffle Demons in 1984

The band had a surprise Top 40 hit in Canada with their 1986 single "Spadina Bus". The song referred to the Toronto Transit Commission's Spadina Avenue bus in Toronto. The album became the best-selling independent release in Canadian music history as of that time, and was a Juno Award nominee for Best Jazz Album at the Juno Awards of 1987.

"Spadina Bus" was also later used as the theme to CITY-TV's show Speakers' Corner.

The Shuffle Demons released four more albums over the next seven years. They never scored another mainstream pop hit, although the video "Get Out of My House, Roach" received considerable airplay on MuchMusic. They retained a devoted following on the jazz scene, however.

In 1987, they appeared on the children's television program Sharon, Lois & Bram's Elephant Show during season four.

== Later career and breakup ==
The group played jazz, folk, world and rock festivals from Halifax to Vancouver and from Italy to Estonia from 1986–1997, touring across Canada 15 times and through Europe 15 times. The Shuffle Demons featured a fusion of hard bop and rap combined with exotic costumes and a no-holds-barred performance style. Over the course of 15 European tours they were a hit at several Jazz festivals including the North Sea Jazz, Molde Jazz, London's Outside In Jazz festival, the Edinburgh Jazz festival, the Sfinks festival, Jazz a Vienne, and FiESTa Internationale in Estonia.

Murley and Vivian left the band in 1989, and were replaced by Perry White and George Koller. Koller left in 1993, and was replaced by Mike Milligan. The following year, Wynston and White left the band, and were replaced by Eric St. Laurent and Greg Smith.

Parker left in 1995. The band subsequently broke up in 1997.

== Reformation and international touring ==
Underhill, Parker, White, Wynston, Koller, and Milligan reformed the band in 2004, releasing a new greatest hits CD to coincide with their reunion tour. During the tour, the band also coordinated a successful attempt at a world record for the largest number of people playing saxophone simultaneously. The official Guinness Book of Records count is 900 participants, all playing the theme from Hockey Night in Canada.

The Shuffle Demons continue to tour and performed at festivals in India, China, and Europe in 2006 and in Thailand, South Korea and the USA in 2010 with great success. In the summer of 2011, the band performed at the Rochester, New York, Markham, Ontario, and Kingston, Ontario Jazz Festivals, as well as touring Australia and New Zealand.

In 2012, Clusterfunk, their first album of new material in seventeen years, was released. It was recorded and mixed between January and September of the previous year, at Canterbury Music and Inception Sound, both located in Toronto.

== Discography ==
- Streetniks (1986)
- Bop Rap (1988)
- What Do You Want? (1990)
- Alive in Europe (1992)
- Extra Crispy (1993)
- Get Right EP (1995)
- Greatest Hits (2004)
- Clusterfunk (2012)
- Crazy Time (2020)
- All In (2022)
- Are You Really Real (2025)
