= David Braid =

Canadian composer and jazz pianist

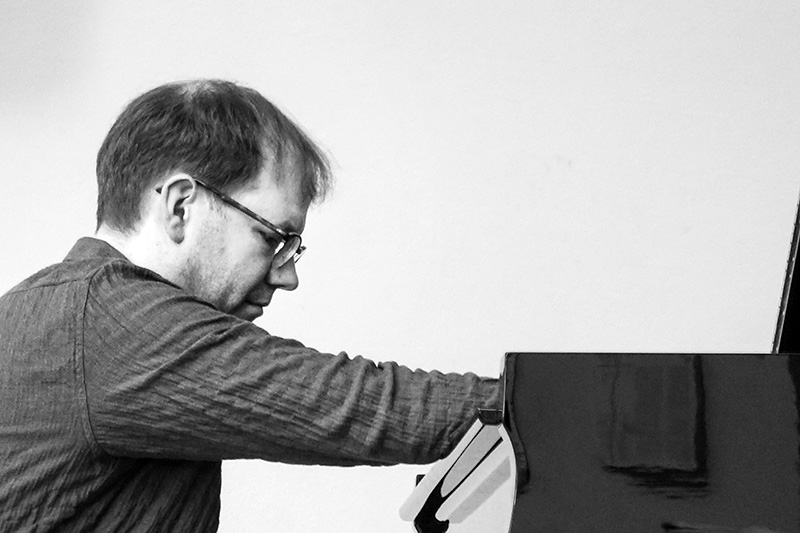
- David Braid in Aarhus, Denmark (2017)

Background information
- Born: 25 March 1975 (age 51); Hamilton, Ontario, Canada
- Genres: Classical, Jazz
- Occupations: Composer, Pianist, Musician
- Instrument: Piano
- Years active: 2001–present
- Label: K52 Music
- Website: davidbraid.com

David Braid (born 25 March 1975 in Hamilton, Ontario) is a Canadian composer and pianist.

== Biography ==
Canadian composer and jazz pianist, David Braid, is "considered one of his country's true renaissance men when it comes to music." (The Ottawa Citizen)

After graduating from the University of Toronto in 1998, Steinway Artist David Braid focused his career performing original music. He formed the "David Braid Sextet" in 1999 with John MacLeod on trumpet; Mike Murley on saxophone; Gene Smith on trombone, Steve Wallace on bass, and Terry Clarke on drums. This band made three albums, with the second one, "Vivid: The David Braid Sextet Live" winning the Juno Award for Traditional Jazz Album of the Year at the Juno Awards of 2005. His albums Mnemosyne's March, Zhen: The David Braid Sextet Live Vol II, Brubeck Braid, Spirit Dance, Flow, have also been nominated for Juno Awards. In 2017, Braid won two Screen Awards, "Best Original Score" and "Best Original Song" for his work on the flm, Born to Be Blue. In 2018, his album "The North" won a Juno Award for Best Jazz Album (Group). His first classical work, Corona Divinae Misericordiae, was nominated for a 2019 Juno Award for Best Classical Album (Choral or Vocal.)

Although Braid developed a reputation as one of the country's most celebrated jazz players, he began moving in a different direction with a solo piano album of original compositions called, "Verge." Braid's 2011 solo piano album, Verge, also won a Juno award for Traditional Jazz Album of the Year.

In 2014, Braid became a Special Associate Artist of Sinfonia UK Collective In summer 2015 he toured with the group in the UK and Canada as part of a project funded by Arts Council England / National Lottery and University of Hull. Braid's approach to work with Sinfonia UK Collective was the focus of a paper on democratic authorship that was presented at the Reflective Conservatoire Conference in February 2015 (Guildhall School of Music and Drama). In that paper, Dr Lee Tsang offered models of democratic authorship and used Braid's work as an example of one of a number of approaches that the Sinfonia UK Collective (formerly Hull Sinfonietta) had undertaken since 2004.

In addition to his collaboration with Sinfonia UK Collective, Braid moved further afield from his jazz roots with his 2016 release "FLOW: David Braid + Epoque String Quartet" on the Steinway & Sons record label. David Braid is also the recipient of the Paul de Hueck and Norman Walford Career Achievement Award for Keyboard Artistry (2016)

Tsang has been a close collaborator, as conductor, baritone and writer of original texts. His involvement with Braid's work includes writing liner notes for the FLOW album, and developing original texts for songs such as Red Hero Cantata, 'Air', 'Nirvana.Lumiere.' 'The Hand' (as featured on the Twisting Ways album). He wrote the words for the semi-dramatic work 'Nine Dragons Fantasy'. He was also a producer on Braid's Corona Divinae Misericordiae album, having been involved as conductor during the work's developmental process. He conducted Resolute Bay which Braid wrote for him and his orchestra, which can be seen here at Braid's Steinway Artist launch concert in Toronto 2015.

== Discography ==
Year recorded	Title	Label	Personnel/Notes
2001	The David Braid Sextet		Sextet, with John MacLeod (flugelhorn, cornet), Mike Murley (tenor sax, soprano sax), Gene Smith (trombone), Steve Wallace (bass), Terry Clarke (drums)
2003	Vivid: The David Braid Sextet Live		Sextet, with John MacLeod (flugelhorn, cornet), Mike Murley (tenor sax, soprano sax), Gene Smith (trombone), Steve Wallace (bass), Terry Clarke (drums); in concert
2004	Beginnings: Nimmons'n'Braid		Duo, with Phil Nimmons (clarinet); in concert
2005	Mnemosyne's March	Cornerstone	Quartet, with Mike Murley (tenor sax, soprano sax), Jim Vivian (bass), Ian Froman (drums); in concert
2005	Zhen: The David Braid Sextet Live, Vol. II	David Braid	Sextet, with John MacLeod (flugelhorn, cornet), Mike Murley (tenor sax, soprano sax), Gene Smith (trombone), Steve Wallace (bass), Terry Clarke (drums); in concert
2006	DMBQ Live		Quintet, with Mike Murley (sax), Tara Davidson (sax), Jim Vivian (bass), Ian Froman (drums); in concert
2007?	Twotet/Deuxtet	Brubeck/Braid	Duo, with Matt Brubeck (cello)
2010?	Spirit Dance	Opening Day	With Canadian Brass
2011	Verge	David Braid	Solo piano
2012	Suite St.John's Falling Through		Some tracks solo piano; some tracks duo, with Phil Nimmons (clarinet); in concert
2016	Flow: David Braid + Epoque String Quartet	Steinway & Sons	With the Epoque String Quartet
2018	The North	Addo	Quartet, with Mike Murley (sax), Johnny Åman (bass), Anders Mogensen (drums)
2018	Corona Divinae Misericordiae	K52 Music	An Oratorio for Soprano, Choir and Chamber Orchestra
2019	Sunday Drive: Hideaki Tokunaga - David Braid	K52 Music	with Hideaki Tokunaga, guitar; David Braid, piano; Putter Smith, bass; Albert Heath, drums
2019	The North Plays Kenny Wheeler	Believe Digital	Quintet with Percy Pursglove, trumpet; Mike Murley, saxophone, David Braid, piano; Johnny Aman, bass, and Anders Mogensen, drums
2022	Dark Butterflies: David Braid - Patricia O'Callaghan - Epoque Orchestra	Forthcoming	with Prague Epoque Chamber Orchestra. Music by David Braid, Words and vocal performances by Patricia O'Callaghan

== Film scores ==
- Dream Recording (2003)
- Photographic Fate (2004)
- China Gate (2011)
- Born to Be Blue (2015)
- Weaving (2017)
- Delia's Gone (2022)
