= George Koller =

Canadian bassist (born 1958)

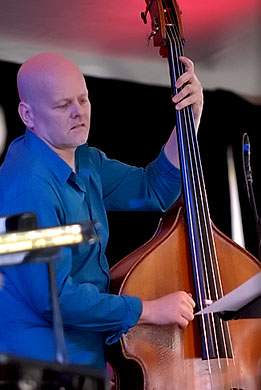

Background information
- Born: December 9, 1958 (age 66); Edmonton, Alberta
- Genres: Jazz, folk, world music
- Occupation: Musician
- Instrument: Bass

George Koller (born December 9, 1958) is a Canadian bassist who has played free jazz, folk music, world music, and world fusion.

== Career ==
Koller has worked with Bruce Cockburn, William Beauvais, Holly Cole, Peter Gabriel, Graeme Kirkland, Loreena McKennitt, The Shuffle Demons, Toronto Tabla Ensemble, Richard Underhill, Phil Woods, David Clayton-Thomas, Autorickshaw, Larry Coryell, Herb Ellis, Art Farmer, Dizzy Gillespie, Eddie Harris, Moe Koffman, Ron Korb, Doug Riley, Valdy, Jane Siberry, Sonny Stitt, and Mary Wilson of The Supremes.

== Awards ==
HMV Fresh Blood Grand Prize, Music for Plants, Animals, and Humans

== Discography ==
=== As leader ===
- Music for Plants, Animals, and Humans (ZSAN 1994)
- Singing Naked (ZSAN 1995)
- Internal Arts (ZSAN 1003)
- Chants de Lumieres (ZSAN 1004)
- Travelin' Light (ZSAN 1005)
- Atmosphere of Bliss (ZSAN 1006)

With The Shuffle Demons

- What Do You Want? (1990)
- Alive in Europe (1992)

=== As sideman ===
With Tisziji Munoz

- Space of Fire (Anami Music, 2015)
- When Coltrane Calls! Session 1: Fierce Compassion (Anami Music, 2016)
- When Coltrane Calls! Session 3: Living Immortality (Anami Music, 2016)
- When Coltrane Calls! Session 2: Liberation First! (Anami Music, 2017)

With others

- Lori Cullen, Garden Path (2000)
- Michael Kaeshammer, No Strings Attached (2000)
- Loreena McKennitt, The Visit (1991)
