= Wray Downes =

Canadian jazz pianist (1931–2020)

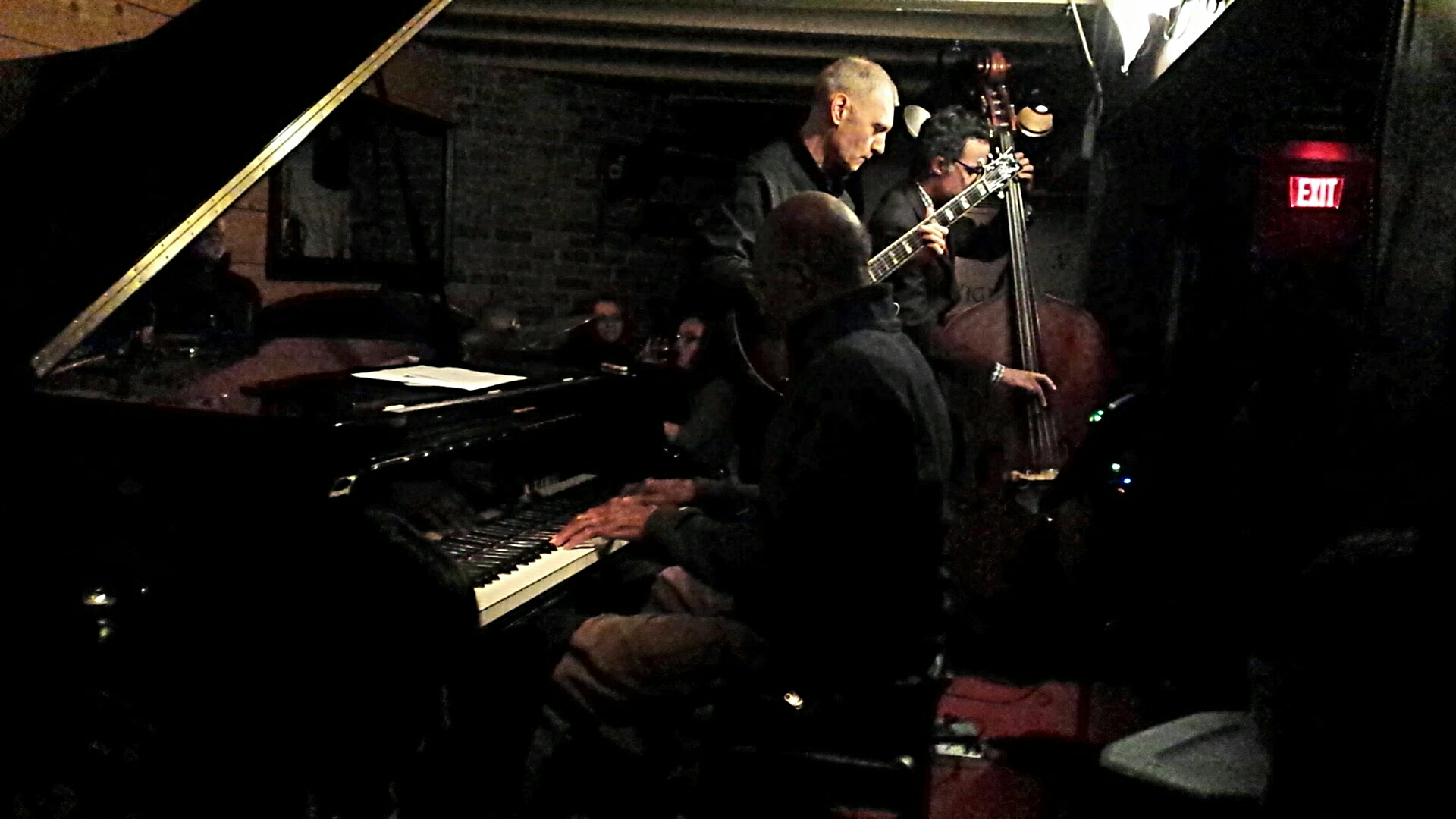
Wray Downes and his other musicians photographed in Montréal, Québec, Canada at Diése Onze.

Wray Downes (January 14, 1931 – March 19, 2020) was a Canadian jazz pianist.

Downes was born in Toronto. He was classically trained, having studied at Trinity College, London, but began playing jazz in 1952 as a student at the Paris Conservatoire. While in France, he played with Sidney Bechet and Bill Coleman. After returning to Canada in the middle of the decade, he played with Oscar Peterson and was a recurring house pianist at the Town Tavern in Toronto, playing with Roy Eldridge, Coleman Hawkins, Clark Terry, and Lester Young. He played for many years with Peter Appleyard and Dave Young, and also worked with Archie Alleyne, Pete Magadini, Buddy Tate, and Dave Turner. He died on March 19, 2020, in Montreal.
