= Roberto Occhipinti =

Canadian jazz bassist and composer (born 1955)

- Born: March 25, 1955 (age 71); Toronto, Ontario, Canada
- Genres: Jazz, classical
- Instruments: Bass
- Education: University of Toronto
- Relatives: Michael Occhipinti (brother)

Roberto Occhipinti (born March 25, 1955) is a Canadian jazz bassist and composer. He is most noted as a two-time Juno Award nominee for Contemporary Jazz Album of the Year, receiving nominations at the Juno Awards of 2006 for his album Yemaya and at the Juno Awards of 2009 for A Bend in the River.

== Early life and education ==
Occhipinti was born and raised in Toronto. He studied music at the University of Toronto, where he was mentored by Joel Quarrington and Dave Young.

== Career ==
Occhipinti is a frequent collaborator with his younger brother Michael Occhipinti, in the Neufeld-Occhipinti Jazz Orchestra and Creation Dream. Their cousin David Occhipinti is also a Juno-nominated jazz musician.

One of relatively few Canadian musicians who have had notable success in both jazz and classical music, he has also frequently performed as a member of the Winnipeg Symphony Orchestra, the Hamilton Symphony Orchestra and the Canadian Opera Company.
