= Adi Braun =

Canadian vocalist and composer

- Born: Adreana Braun; November 23, 1962 (age 63); Toronto, Ontario, Canada
- Genres: Jazz
- Occupations: Singer, composer
- Years active: 1990s–present
- Labels: Blue Rider
- Website: adibraun.com

Adreana "Adi" Braun (born November 23, 1962) is a Canadian jazz and cabaret vocalist and composer.

Adi Braun was born in Canada and brought up in Germany. Her family is musical: her parents were professional singers (her father was Victor Braun), and her brother, Russell, is also a singer. She has cited Judy Garland, Barbra Streisand, and Lotte Lenya as influences. After moving to Canada, Braun graduated in music from the University of Toronto, then became involved in the jazz scene in the city. She co-founded Blue Rider Records in the early 2000s. In English, she "sings with a slight German accent".

== Discography ==
- Delishious (Blue Rider, 2003)
- The Rules of the Game (Blue Rider, 2005)
- Live at the Metropolitan Room (Blue Rider, 2008)
- Canadian Scenes 1 (Blue Rider, 2010)
- Moderne Frau (Blue Rider, 2017)
- Night and Day - The Cole Porter Songbook (Alma Records, 2023)
