= Robi Botos =

Hungarian-Canadian jazz pianist

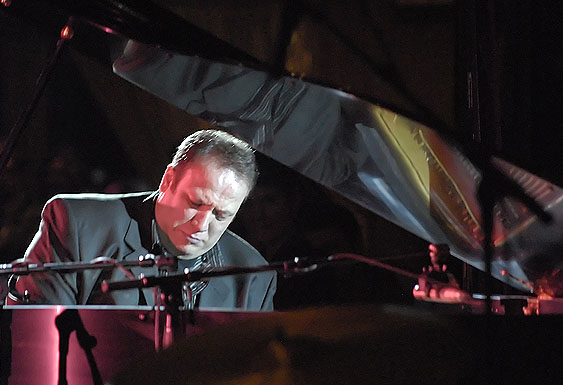
- Botos at the 2008 Hungarian National Jazz Awards

Background information
- Born: October 12, 1978 (age 47); Nyíregyháza, Hungary
- Genres: Jazz
- Occupation: Jazz pianist
- Website: www.robibotos.com

Robi Botos is a Hungarian-Canadian jazz pianist. He has recorded several albums as a leader and was the winner of the TD Grand Jazz Award at the 2012 Montreal International Jazz Festival. In 2016, Botos won the JUNO Award for Best Jazz Album of the Year (Solo) for his recording of Movin' Forward.

== Biography ==
Botos was born in Nyíregyháza to a Roma family, and grew up in Budapest. His first instrument was drums, and at age seven he began playing piano. In 1998 Botos immigrated to Canada and he has been a prominent member of the Toronto jazz scene since.

Botos has played with the performers including Michael Brecker, Pat LaBarbera, and Dave Young among others. In addition to winning the TD Award in 2012 he also won the Montreux Jazz Festival piano competition in 2004. Botos has recorded several albums as a leader of various bands. Additionally, he composed the music to the 2011 documentary A People Uncounted. Botos was also the last protegé of legendary Canadian jazz pianist Oscar Peterson.

In 2015, Botos recorded the album Movin' Forward in Toronto. Botos was accompanied by drummer Jeff "Tain" Watts and bassist Robert Hurst, both alumni of Wynton Marsalis' band. Seamus Blake of New York City played sax and EWI. The album won a Juno Award for best Jazz Album of the Year (Solo) in 2016.

== Discography ==
=== As leader/co-leader ===
- One Take, Volume 2 (Alma, 2005)
- Christmas Eve (Music Design, 2009)
- One Take, Volume 4 (Alma, 2010)
- Mercy with Bill McBirnie (Extreme Flute, 2010)
- Place to Place (A440 Entertainment, 2011)
- Friday Night Jazz (Allegro, 2013)
- Movin' Forward (A440 Entertainment, 2015)
- Old Soul (A440 Entertainment, 2018)
- Barlow, Botos & Alexander Play Monk with Brian Barlow, Scott Alexander (Rhythm Tracks, 2018)

=== As sideman ===
- Kristy Cardinali, My Romance (Alma, 2009)
