= Mike Downes =

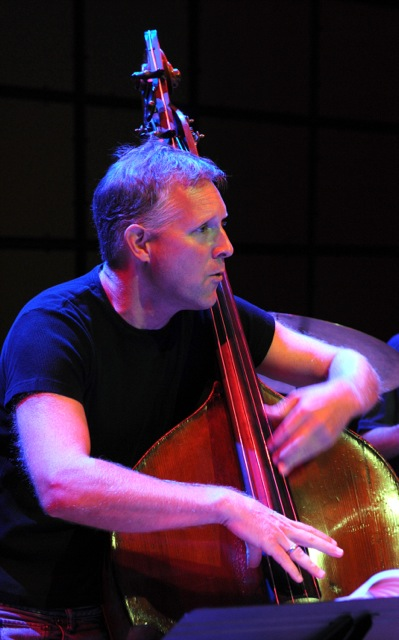

Background information
- Born: Winnipeg, Manitoba
- Origin: Canada
- Genre: Jazz
- Instrument: Bass

Mike Downes is a Canadian jazz musician, composer, arranger and educator who specializes on the upright bass, composition and arranging. Downes has appeared on JUNO award-winning and nominated recordings, including his own Ripple Effect, which won a 2014 JUNO Award for Traditional Jazz Album of the Year, and "Root Structure", which won the 2018 JUNO Award for Jazz Album of the Year:Solo.

== Biography ==
Downes began performing in his native Winnipeg, where he was named "Jazz Musician of the Year" at Silver Heights Collegiate high school. He was chosen as a member of the Canadian All-Star stage band (trombone) in the 1982 MusicFest Canada competition. Following high school he studied at Nova Scotia's St. F.X. University and completed a Bachelor of Music degree at McGill University in Montreal. During this time he began recording and touring internationally as a sideman with Canadian and visiting international artists.

In 1990 Downes moved to Toronto and began frequently performing in jazz clubs such as the Top O' the Senator and the Jazz Bistro, as well as concert venues such as Roy Thomson Hall, Massey Hall, CBC's Glenn Gould Theatre and the O'Keefe Centre. "Forces," his first recording as a leader, was released in 1995 on Polygram. Following that release Jazz Report magazine noted "Bassist Mike Downes is one of Canada's immensely talented young giants."

Downes has since continued to perform worldwide. He has performed with Canadian artists including Molly Johnson, Oliver Jones, PJ Perry, Don Thompson, Seamus Blake, Guido Basso and Pat LaBarbera and with international jazz artists including Pat Metheny, Chris Potter, John Abercrombie, Peter Erskine, Kenny Wheeler, John Taylor, Dave Liebman and others.

Mike was appointed Bass Department Head at Humber College in Toronto in 2000. In 2008 Downes completed a master's degree in music composition at York University in Toronto.

Publications include The Jazz Bass Line Book published by Advance/Schott Music and Jazz and Contemporary Music Theory. He became a Yamaha artist in 2004 and helped in the design of the Yamaha SLB-200 Silent Bass.

== Awards and honors ==
Juno Awards

- 2009 Jazz Vocal Album of the Year, Lucky, Molly Johnson[3]
- 2014 Traditional Jazz Album of the Year, Ripple Effect, Mike Downes[1]
- 2018 Jazz Album of the Year:Solo, Root Structure, Ted Quinlan, Larnell Lewis and Robi Botos
- 2019 Jazz Album of the Year:Solo, Old Soul, Robi Botos

Juno Award nominations

- 1995 Bill Please, Lorne Lofsky
- 2001 Dark Divas, Ranee Lee
- 2003 Another Day, Molly Johnson
- 2004 Maple Groove, Ranee Lee
- 2007 Messin' Around, Molly Johnson
- 2013 Identity, Shirantha Beddage
- 2015 Because of Billie, Molly Johnson
- 2016 Legacy Live, Jens Lindemann and Tommy Banks
- 2017 Momentum, Shirantha Beddage
- 2019 Meaning to Tell Ya, Molly Johnson
- 2019 In the Moment, Larnell Lewis
- 2020 The Chronicles of Fezziwig, Mark Kelso
- 2020 SymphRonica UpFront, Ron Davis
- 2022 Then is Now, Jens Lindemann
- 2024 Convergence, Nick Mclean
- 2025 The Antrim Coast, Mark Kelso's Mystic Isle Project

Montreal Jazz Festival Prix de Jazz winner

- 1996 Roy Patterson Quartet
- 2012 Robi Botos Trio[2]

Other

- College Innovator of the Year Award, League for Innovation in the Community College, 2000
- National Jazz Awards nomination, Jazz Bassist of the Year, 2005, 2006
- Humber College Distinguished Faculty Award, 2006, 2009
- NISOD Excellence Award, University of Texas at Austin, 2007
- 2018 Louis Applebaum Composers' Award - Jazz Composition nomination, 2018

== Selected discography ==
=== As a leader ===
- Forces (Counterpoint, 1995)[1]
- The Winds of Change (TopFrog, 2004)
- Then (M Music, 2009)
- Ripple Effect (Addo, 2013)
- In the Current (Addo, 2013)
- Root Structure (Addo, 2017)
- Mind Mirrors (M Music, 2022)
- The Way In (2024)

=== As a sideman ===
- Vikrama (Knut Haugsoen) – Hands On (Unity, 1989)
- Trisha Pope – T (MCA/Duke Street, 1992)
- Vikrama – Experience (Unity, 1992)
- Roy/Lerner w/Peter Erskine – Quarter to Three (Justin Time, 1992)
- Jacek Kochan w/John Abercrombie – Corporate Highlanders (Unit, 1992)
- Steve Holt Quartet – Catwalk (Sackville, 1993)
- Richard Whiteman Quartet – This is Now (Counterpoint, 1994)
- Lorne Lofsky Trio – Bill Please (Jazz Inspiration, 1994)
- Richard Whiteman Trio – Grooveyard (Counterpoint, 1996)
- Earl MacDonald – Schroeder's Tantrum (Radioland, 1997)
- Ranee Lee – Dark Divas (Justin Time, 2000)
- Molly Johnson – Another Day (EMI Marquis, 2002)
- Bob Brough – A Decade of Favorites (Robert H Brough, 2003)
- Ranee Lee – Maple Groove (Justin Time, 2003)
- Gap Mangione – Stolen Moments (Josh Music, 2003)
- Ted's Warren Commission – First Time Caller (Ted Warren, 2004)
- Louise Pitre – Shattered (Universal, 2004)
- Molly Johnson – Messin' Around (Universal, 2006)
- Dean McNeill – Prairie Fire: Large Jazz Ensemble (Cellar Live, 2007)
- Ron Davis – Subarashii Live (Davinor, 2007)
- Bill Prouten – Low-down, No-good (Bill Prouten, 2007)
- Patrick Boyle – Still No Word (Patrick Boyle, 2008)
- Ted's Warren Commission – Songs for Doug (Ted Warren, 2008)
- Jasna Jovicevic – Invented Reality (Jasna Jovicevic, 2008)
- Molly Johnson – Lucky A440 Entertainment (Universal Music Classics France, 2008)
- Ron Davis – My Mother's Father's Song (Minerva Road/Davinor, 2010)
- Will Fisher Coastal Quartet – Portage (Will Fisher, 2011)
- Molly Johnson – The Molly Johnson Songbook (Universal Music Canada, 2011)
- Shirantha Beddage – Identity (Addo, 2012)
- Molly Johnson – Because of Billie (Universal, 2014))
- Mary Panacci – Her Perfume (Independent, 2014)
- Daniela Nardi – Canto (Minerva Road, 2015)
- Ron Davis – Pocket SymphRonica (Really, 2015)
- Mark Promane – Canadiana Suite (Independent, 2015)
- Ben Ball Quartet – 401 Towards London (Independent, 2015)
- Jens Lindemann & Tommy Banks – Legacy Live (Independent, 2016)
- Ted's Warren Commission – The Great Regina Pizza Debate (Independent, 2016)
- Shirantha Beddage – Momentum (Independent, 2016)
- Patrick Boyle – After Forgetting (Independent, 2017)
- Ron Davis – SymphRonica UpFront (Independent, 2017)
- John Pittman – Kinship (Independent, 2017)
- Robi Botos – Old Soul (Independent, 2018)
- Molly Johnson – Meaning to Tell Ya (Universal Music Canada, 2018)
- Larnell Lewis – In the Moment (Independent, 2018)
- Ron Davis' Symphronicia – instrumental music Liberation Front (Independent, 2020)
