= Hilario Durán =

Cuban-Canadian jazz pianist

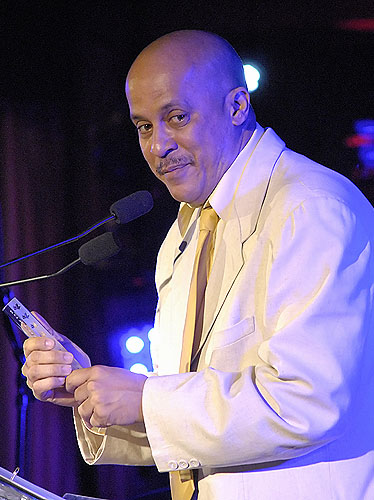
Hilario Durán in 2008

Hilario Durán (born 1953, Havana) is a Cuban-Canadian jazz pianist.

Durán studied at Conservatorio "Amadeo Roldán" Amadeo Roldan Music Institute in Havana, studying tumbao with Evaristo Aparicio, composition and conducting from German Pifferrer, and orchestration from Guillermo Barreto. He formed a group in the 1970s called Los D'Siempre, which melded traditional Cuban elements with those of modern jazz. He joined Arturo Sandoval's band from 1981 to 1990. He also worked with Dizzy Gillespie's United Nation Orchestra and Michel Legrand. He formed a new group, Perspectiva, in 1990, and toured Central America and Europe. From 1995 he worked as a solo artist in Toronto, Canada, and has collaborated over the course of his career with Tata Güines, Changuito, Horacio "El Negro" Hernandez, Jorge Reyes, Roberto Occhipinti, Larry Cramer, John Patitucci, Michael Brecker, Regina Carter, Dave Valentin, Juan Pablo Torres, John Benitez, Dafnis Prieto, Hugh Marsh, Carlos "Patato" Valdés, Lenny Andrade, Quartetto Gelato, Jane Bunnett, Alexis Baro and the Gryphon Trio. Duran was nominated for Juno Awards in 2002, 2005, 2006, and 2007, winning in 2005 for New Danzon, and 2007:From The Heart", this album also was Grammy nominated.

== Discography ==
- Habana 9 P.M. (Areito, 1978)
- Francisco's Song (Justin Time, 1996)
- Killer Tumbao (Justin Time, 1997)
- Havana Flute Summit (Naxos Jazz, 1997)
- Habana Nocturna (Justin Time, 1999)
- Havana Remembered (Avalon Music, 2002)
- New Danzon (Alma Records, 2005)
- Encuentro en La Habana (Alma, 2006)
- From the Heart (Alma, 2006)
- Motion (Alma, 2010)
- Cuban Rhapsody (Alma, 2011) with Jane Bunnett
- Christmas Salsa (Avalon, 2013)
- Contumbao (Alma, 2017)
- The Cuban (Alma, 2019)
- Cry Me A River (2023)
