= Looking Up (Hugh Fraser album) =

Studio album by Hugh Fraser Quintet
- Released: 1988
- Genre: Jazz
- Length: 53:18
- Label: CBC Records

Hugh Fraser chronology
Looking Up (1988)	Pas De Problems (1989)

Looking Up is an album by the Hugh Fraser Quintet, which was released in 1988 by CBC Records. It won the 1989 Juno Award for Best Jazz Album.
