= Michael Occhipinti =

Canadian jazz guitarist and composer

Michael Occhipinti is a Canadian jazz guitarist and composer. A founding member of the Neufeld-Occhipinti Jazz Orchestra, he is most noted as a three-time Juno Award nominee for Contemporary Jazz Album of the Year, receiving nominations at the Juno Awards of 2001 for his album Creation Dream, at the Juno Awards of 2008 for Chasing After Light, and at the Juno Awards of 2009 for The Sicilian Jazz Project.

He is also a frequent collaborator with his older brother Roberto Occhipinti. Their cousin David Occhipinti is also a Juno-nominated jazz musician.

== Early life ==
Occhipinti's parents were Sicilian and immigrated to Toronto in the 1950s.

== Teaching career ==
Along with performing live music and composition, Occhipinti has taught and continues to teach jazz at various musical institutions in the Toronto area. At The Royal Conservatory of Music in downtown Toronto, Occhipinti hosts small ensemble jazz combos, teaches jazz theory classes, along with programming various camps that happen periodically throughout the year. Occhipinti is also on the faculty at Centennial College and York University, teaching private lessons and ensemble.
