= Kelly Jefferson =

Canadian musician (born 1970)

- Born: March 4, 1970 (age 56); Regina, Saskatchewan, Canada
- Occupation: Jazz saxophonist
- Instrument: Saxophone
- Website: www.kellyjeffersonmusic.com

Kelly Jefferson is a Canadian jazz saxophonist (born March 4, 1970, in Regina, Saskatchewan), he has recorded and performed with numerous jazz musicians and bands.

Jefferson has a Bachelor of Music degree from McGill University in Montreal, Quebec, and a master's degree from the Manhattan School of Music in New York, New York. He serves on the faculty of the University of Toronto as well as York University in Toronto, Ontario, and previously taught at McGill University.

He has performed with the Montreal Symphony Orchestra, Ottawa's National Arts Centre Orchestra, the Vanguard Jazz Orchestra, The Chris Tarry Group, and many other jazz artists. He toured the United States and Europe as tenor saxophonist with Maynard Ferguson and Big Bop Nouveau. He leads the Kelly Jefferson trio and co-leads the Jefferson Grant Quintet with trombonist Kelsley Grant.

Jefferson was nominated for Canada's National Jazz Awards in 2005 and 2006.

== Discography ==
- Chris Tarry – The Chris Tarry Group - Rest of the Story (2011)
- Kelly Jefferson Quartet – Next Exit (2010)
- Chris Tarry – The Chris Tarry Group - Almost Certainly Dreaming (2007)
- Chris Tarry – The Chris Tarry Group - Sorry to be Strange (2006)
- Kelly Jefferson Quartet – Spark (2005)
- Marc Rogers – Lunasa (2003)
- Daniel Barnes – Culmination (2003)
- Time Warp – Warp IX (2003)
- Jefferson Grant Quintet – As One (2002)
- Chris Tarry – Chris Tarry's Project 33 (2002)
- Jefferson Grant Quintet – JGQ (1999)
- Joshua Rager Sextet – Joshua Rager Sextet
- Neil Swainson; Fire in the West (2020)
