= François Bourassa (musician) =

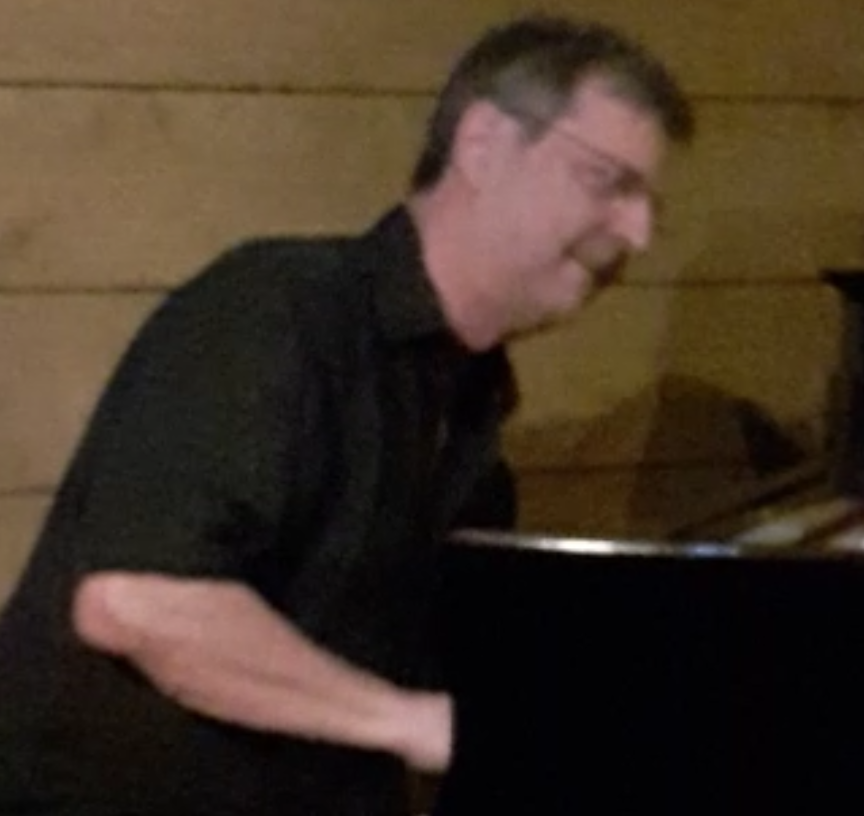
- François Bourassa photographed in Montréal, Québec, Canada at Dièse Onze .

Background information
- Born: 26 September 1959 (age 66); Montreal, Quebec, Canada
- Genres: Jazz
- Occupation: Pianist
- Instrument: Piano
- Website: francoisbourassa.com

François Bourassa (French pronunciation: [fʁɑ̃swa buʁasa]; born 26 September 1959, in Montreal) is a jazz pianist from Quebec. He is the son of Robert Bourassa.

His music is influenced by pianists such as Thelonious Monk, Brad Mehldau, and Chick Corea, as well as art music from the Classical and Romantic eras.

== Awards ==
- 1985 – Winner of the Festival de jazz de Montréal contest.
- 2001, 2002 – Juno Award for Contemporary Jazz Album of the Year
- 2004 – Prix Opus, concert of the year
- 2004 – Prix Opus, concert of the year (jazz/world music)
- 2004 – Prix Félix, jazz album of the year
- 2007 – Prix Oscar Peterson from the Montreal International Jazz Festival
