= Victor Braun =

Canadian opera singer

- Born: Victor Conrad Braun; August 4, 1935; Windsor, Ontario
- Died: January 6, 2001 (aged 65)
- Genres: Opera
- Occupation: Baritone opera singer
- Instrument: Vocals

Victor Conrad Braun (August 4, 1935 – January 6, 2001) was a Canadian baritone who had a major international performance career in concerts and operas that lasted more than 40 years. While he was an accomplished performer of the standard opera works of Mozart, Puccini, Strauss, Verdi, and Wagner; he was particularly lauded for his portrayals of works by 20th-century composers like Alban Berg, Bartók, Henze, Siegfried Matthus, and Luciano Berio among others.

== Life and career ==
Born in Windsor, Ontario, Braun initially studied geology at the University of Western Ontario (UWO) before deciding to pursue a singing career. While a student at UWO he began studying voice privately with Lillian Wilson in London, Ontario in 1954. In 1956 he entered The Royal Conservatory of Music where he studied singing with George Lambert and Weldon Kilburn. That same year he became a member of the chorus of the Canadian Opera Company (COC). He made his professional solo debut with the company in 1957 as Sciarrone in Puccini's Tosca. He remained committed to the COC for the next five years where he was heard in mainly secondary parts. However, his profile with the company was considerably raised when he gave a much lauded portrayal of Escamillo in Georges Bizet's Carmen in 1961; a role he performed with the company again in 1964. Another critical success for him at the COC was the part of Monterone in Verdi's Rigoletto (1962).

In 1963 Braun left Canada for Europe after having won a stipend to study singing further in Vienna. Just a few months after his time there, he drew international attention for the first time when he won the grand prize at the 1963 Vienna International Mozart Competition. This accomplishment drew the attention of Wieland Wagner who took it upon himself to get Braun a contract with the Frankfurt Opera. He remained a resident artist in Frankfurt for the next five years singing a variety of roles, including Count Almaviva in The Marriage of Figaro and Ottone in Monteverdi's L'incoronazione di Poppea among others. During his time in Frankfurt, he began to appear regularly as a guest artist with other important opera houses in Europe. He sang at the Cologne Opera (1965-1966), Deutsche Oper am Rhein (1966-1968), La Scala (1967, as Wolfram in Tannhäuser), and the Staatsoper Stuttgart (1967-1969) among others.

In 1968 Braun left Frankfurt to become a resident artist at the Bavarian State Opera where he made his debut that year as Almaviva. He remained a contracted member of that house for more than two decades, singing such roles as the Count in Capriccio, Enrico in Lucia di Lammermoor, Ford in Falstaff, Giorgio Germont in La traviata, Golaud in Pelléas et Mélisande, Marcello in La Bohème, Posa in Don Carlos, Scarpia in Tosca, and the title roles in Don Giovanni and Rigoletto among others. At the same time, his career continued to expand internationally with leading roles at the San Francisco Opera (1968 debut as the Count di Luna in Il trovatore) and the Royal Opera, London (1969 debut in the title role of Eugene Onegin). He continued to appear at major opera houses throughout the remainder of his career, including performances with the Berlin State Opera, the Glyndebourne Festival Opera, the Lyric Opera of Chicago, the Metropolitan Opera, the New Orleans Opera, the Opera Company of Boston, Opéra de Nice, the Paris Opera, and the Santa Fe Opera among others. His final opera appearance was in 2000 at the Salzburg Festival as Calchas in La Belle Hélène.

Braun died of Shy–Drager syndrome at the age of 65 in 2001. Braun leaves behind several children - his son Russell Braun is also a Canadian opera singer, his daughter Adi Braun is a professional jazz singer, his son Torsten is the lead vocalist with the band Defective by Design, his son Tim Braun is a baritone living in Cologne and son Lars is a computer analyst living in Düsseldorf, Germany.
