= Fables and Dreams =

Studio album by Dave Young / Phil Dwyer Quartet
- Released: 1993
- Genre: Jazz
- Length: 58:00
- Label: Justin Time

Dave Young chronology
Soulful Swinging (1988)	Fables and Dreams (1993)	Live at Bourbon St. (1995)

Fables and Dreams is an album by Canadian bassist Dave Young with the Phil Dwyer Quartet, which was released in 1993 by Justin Time Records. It won the 1994 Juno Award for Best Mainstream Jazz Album.
