= Harry Vetro =

Canadian drummer and composer

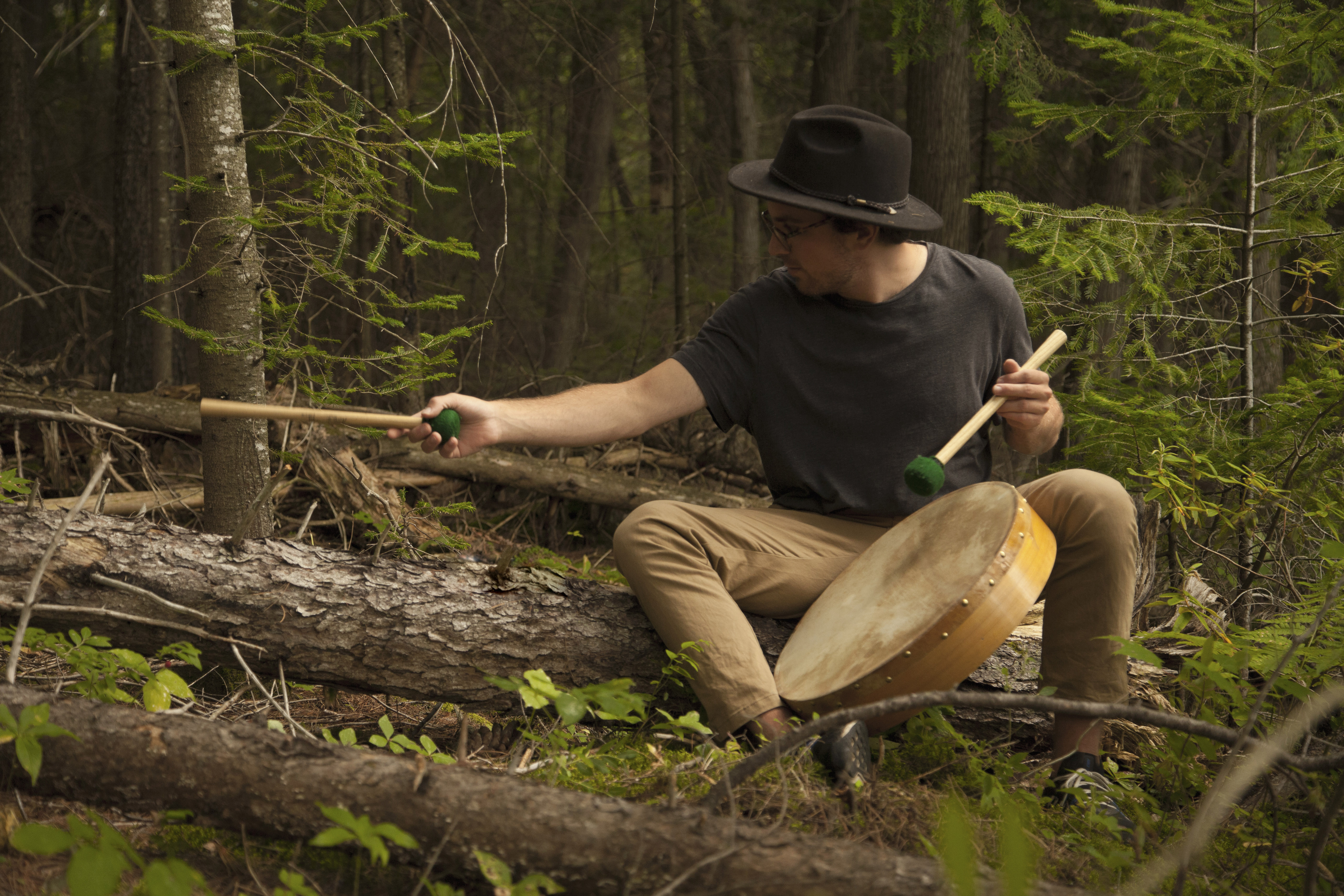
- Vetro in 2023

Background information
- Born: August 28, 1995 (age 30); Mississauga, Ontario, Canada
- Genres: Jazz
- Occupations: Musician, composer
- Instruments: Drums, piano
- Years active: 2018–present
- Member of: Harry Vetro's Northern Ranger
- Website: harryvetro.com

Harry Vetro (born August 28, 1995) is a Canadian drummer and composer. He has recording credits with such Canadian jazz players as Mike Murley and Steve Wallace.

Vetro has received multiple grants from Canada Council for the Arts, Ontario Arts Council, and FACTOR (The Foundation Assisting Canadian Talent on Recordings).

== Career ==
Vetro's band, Harry Vetro's Northern Ranger has been noted by the Calgary Herald as "some of the top players in Canada, [who] are very dedicated to bringing jazz to different communities and really trying to expand the art form.” Northern Ranger's influences range from Gordon Lightfoot, The Band, and Fleet Foxes to Bill Frisell, Kenny Wheeler and Brad Mehldau. The band released a self-titled album in 2018, which reached the National Jazz charts in Canada.

In late 2019, Starbucks discovered Vetro's song "Buffalo Jump" on Spotify. The song was added to the “Starbucks Jazz” Spotify playlist, and Vetro is the only contemporary Canadian Jazz musician featured on that playlist.

Vetro is also a member of the Toronto-band Harrison² (pronounced Harrison Squared) with Harrison Argatoff, Mike Murley, and Steve Wallace. That group released the album Trout in Swimwear in 2020; the album received positive reviews from the jazz press. Stuart Broomer of The Wholenote Magazine stated: "The absence of a chordal instrument opens up the music, encouraging the saxophonists’ dialogue and heightening Wallace and Vetro's presence. It puts Wallace's strong lines in the foreground and adds more room for his sculpted solos; Vetro is a very good drummer, precise and assertive with a keen sense of form."

== Discography ==
Year released	Title	Label	Notes
2018	Northern Ranger	T.Sound	Lina Allemano (trumpet), Harrison Argatoff (saxophone), Dan Pitt (guitar), Noah Franche Nolan (piano), Andrew Downing (bass), Phil Albert (bass), Jacob Thompson (piano), Ian McGimpsey (guitar), Jessica Deutsch (violin), Aline Homzy (violin), Anna Atkinson (viola), Andrew Downing (cello)
2019	Eastern Stranger EP	Independent	Quartet with Nelson Moneo (violin), Noah Franche-Nolan (piano) and Victor Vrankulj (bass)
2019	Trout in Swimwear	Independent	Harrison² featuring Harrison Argatoff (saxophone), Mike Murley (saxophone), and Steve Wallace (bass)
2020	To Niagara, With Love	Independent	The Nick Arseneau Quintet featuring John Nicholson (saxophone), Marie Goudy (Trumpet), Josh Smiley (piano), Patrick O'Rielly (guitar), Nick Arseneau (bass), Harry Vetro (drums)
2021	Ahead by a Century	Independent	Harry Vetro's Northern Ranger featuring Jacob Thompson (piano) and Phil Albert (bass)
2022	Wildwood	Independent	The Harry Bartlett Trio featuring Harry Bartlett (guitar), Caleb Klager (bass) and Harry Vetro (drums)
