= Brandi Disterheft =

Canadian bassist and composer

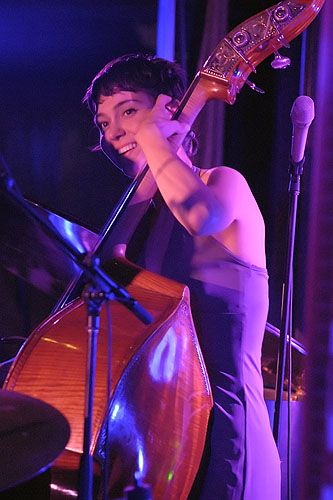
- Brandi Disterheft, 2008

Background information
- Born: 1980 (age 45–46); Vancouver, British Columbia, Canada
- Genres: Jazz
- Instrument: bass
- Website: Official site

Brandi Disterheft (born 1980) is a Canadian jazz bassist and composer.

== Biography ==
Born in Vancouver, British Columbia, Canada, Disterheft grew up in the District of North Vancouver, British Columbia where she attended Handsworth Secondary School. Upon graduation, she won scholarship to attend Humber College in Toronto, Ontario where she studied under Don Thompson.

Disterheft has also studied with Ron Carter, Rufus Reid, Rodney Whitaker, and Oscar Peterson. Peterson notably said about Disterheft, "She has the same lope or rhythmic pulse as my bassist, Ray Brown. She is what we call serious."

== Discography ==
- Debut (Superfran, 2007)
- Second Side (Justin Time, 2009)
- Pleased To Meet You - Hank Jones and Oliver Jones (pianist) (Justin Time, 2009)
- Gratitude (Justin Time, 2012)
- Blue Canvas (Justin Time, 2016)
- Surfboard (Justin Time, 2020)

== Awards and recognition ==
- 2008: winner, Juno Award for Traditional Jazz Album of the Year, Debut
