= Richard Underhill =

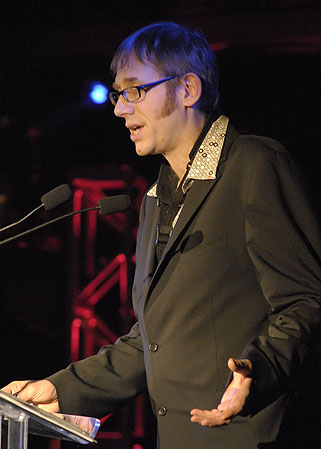
- Underhill at the Juno Awards in 2003

Background information
- Genres: Jazz
- Instruments: Alto saxophone, baritone saxophone
- Years active: c. 1985 – present
- Member of: The Shuffle Demons
- Website: www.richardunderhill.com

Richard Underhill is a Canadian jazz saxophonist. A founding member of the jazz fusion group The Shuffle Demons, he has toured Europe and Canada to critical acclaim for over 27 years. Underhill won a 2003 Juno Award for his jazz solo debut Tales from the Blue Lounge, and was nominated for the Prix du Jazz at the 2003 Montreal Jazz Festival. He followed up with the Juno nominated Moment in Time in 2005, Juno nominated Kensington Suite in 2007 and the CD/DVD Free Spirit in 2010.

== Musical career ==
The founding member of Toronto's Shuffle Demons, Underhill took the Bop Rap ensemble from the streets of Toronto across Canada and to Europe. The group played jazz, folk, world and rock festivals from Halifax to Vancouver and from Italy to Estonia from 1986–1997, touring across Canada 15 times and through Europe 15 times. They played at several Jazz festivals including the North Sea Jazz, Molde Jazz, London's Outside In Jazz festival, the Edinburgh Jazz festival, the Sfinks festival, and Jazz a Vienne.

They celebrated their 20th anniversary with a cross-Canada tour and by breaking the Guinness Book World Records for most sax players performing a song (900), although the record was later broken. The Shuffle Demons continue to tour and performed at festivals in India, China, and Europe in 2006 and in Thailand, South Korea, and the US in 2010. The band is currently working on a new album and toured Australia and New Zealand in 2011.

Underhill has performed and recorded with The Neville Brothers/Meters, Han Bennink, Julius Hemphill, Dr. John, Kathleen Edwards, Taj Mahal, Maria Muldaur, Rob McConnell, Molly Johnson, Blue Rodeo, Andy Stochansky, Hawksley Workman, The Sadies, Luke Doucet, Bob Wiseman, Soul Rebels, Kevin Breit, NOMA and Toronto jazz stalwarts like Steve Koven, Tyler Yarema, and George Koller.

A session player and sideman, he has written horn and string arrangements for Kathleen Edwards, Molly Johnson, Andy Stochansky, Hawksley Workman, Blue Rodeo, Bob Wiseman, Big Rude Jake, and Lorraine Segato.

He leads several diverse groups including his jazz quintet, the Funk Explosion and the improvising electronic groove ensemble Astrogroove. He also leads an improvising/free-jazz group, whose members vary but are mostly horn players, called The Kensington Community Orchestra. They most often play in Toronto's Kensington Market to celebrate car-free Sundays, and annually on December 21 for the solstice party Festival of Lights.

== Toronto mayoral candidacy ==
On January 2, 2014, Underhill officially declared his mayoral candidacy for the city of Toronto, Canada for the 2014 Toronto election, running against incumbent Rob Ford. Underhill applied for a candidacy on January 2 with a marching band. His platform is largely transit based. He expressed resentment for being called a "fringe candidate" by Toronto Life, as he considers himself a serious candidate but embraces it to attempt to prove them wrong through his actions in his campaign.

Underhill took part in the first debate of the elections on February 5, 2014, along with 4 other candidates including incumbent Rob Ford.

He withdrew his candidacy on September 12, 2014, endorsing Olivia Chow for mayor.

== Personal life ==
Underhill grew up in Salmon Arm, British Columbia, and attended Salmon Arm Senior High where he graduated from in 1979. He can often be found out and about in the Kensington Market area of Toronto's downtown district.

Underhill performed Van Morrison's Into the Mystic at the state funeral for Jack Layton, deceased New Democratic Leader of the Official Opposition, on August 27, 2011.

== Discography ==
- Tales from the Blue Lounge (2003)
- Moment in Time (2005)
- Kensington Suite (2007)
- Free Spirit (2010)
