= Four80East =

Canadian electro jazz ensemble

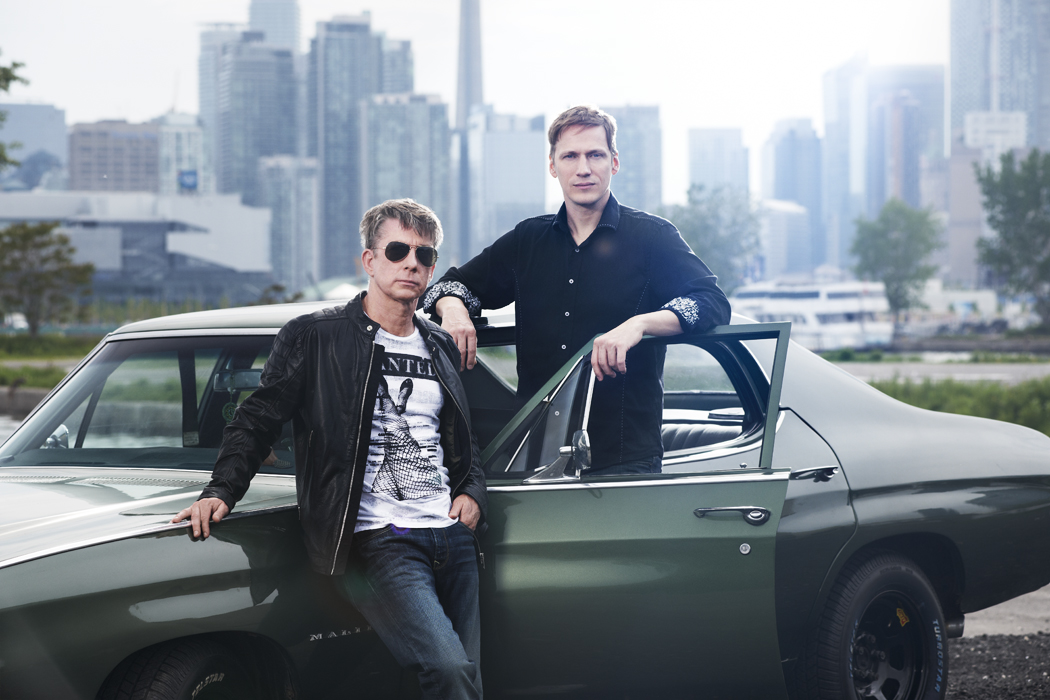
- Four80East founding members, Tony Grace (left) and Rob DeBoer (right).

Background information
- Origin: Toronto, Ontario, Canada
- Genres: Jazz, electro jazz, contemporary jazz, acid jazz
- Years active: 1997-present
- Labels: Native Language, Boomtang Records
- Members: Rob DeBoer and Tony Grace
- Website: www.four80east.com

Four80East is a Canadian electro jazz ensemble from Toronto, Ontario, with Rob DeBoer (keyboards, bass and guitar) and Tony Grace (percussion); accompanied by various session musicians. Although Four80East began as a studio concept, they have evolved into a live act. Their music is known for its percussive, melodic flow and bass grooves.

== History ==
Four80East began as a studio project when DeBoer and Grace, who had been writing, arranging and producing for other artists on their Boomtang Records label (cf. The Boomtang Boys), put together material of their own and released it as The Album, in 1997. The Album was well received by critics and the public alike. The group's name comes from the address of Boomtang's recording studio, The Speed of Sound, at 480 Richmond Street East in Toronto.

In 1998, they had released music video titled "Four80East: Eastside" and styled black and white, based on music track from The Album under same name "Eastside". Video had been filmed on locations in Toronto, Ontario, Canada. Director was Jeremy Hood, filmed by Domenico A. Galloro. Budget was estimated as CA$20,000 Filming studio was Raje Films.

The pair's second album Nocturnal, was released in 2001; DeBoer and Grace wrote all of the songs for the album, and enlisted tenor saxophonist Jon Stewart, flutist Andrew McPherson, and trumpeter Ivana Santilli to contribute instrumentals.

The album Round 3 came out in 2002, and included contributions from harmonica player Carlos Del Junco.

Their fourth album, En Route, containing instrumental dance music, was released in 2007.

Four80East's fifth CD, Roll On, came out in 2009, followed by a sixth, Off Duty, in 2012.

Four80East LIVE, a collection of 15 select songs recorded from three different shows, was released in early 2014.

The group is also featured on the 2007 compilation album, The Weather Channel Presents: The Best of Smooth Jazz.

== Band members ==
Permanent members

- Rob DeBoer – keyboards, bass and guitar
- Tony Grace – percussion

== Albums ==
=== Studio albums ===
Year	Album	Peak chart positions		Label
Year	Album	US Jazz	US Con. Jazz	Label
1998	The Album	29	18	Boomtang
2001	Nocturnal	26	15	Boomtang
2003	Round 3	—	—	Boomtang
2007	En Route	25	10	Boomtang
2009	Roll On	20	10	Boomtang
2012	Off Duty	26	11	Boomtang
2015	Positraction	—	—	Boomtang
2020	Straight Round	—	—	Boomtang
2021	Mixed Up (remixes)	—	—	Boomtang
2023	Gonna Be Alright	—	—	Boomtang
"—" denotes a recording that did not chart.

=== Live albums ===
Year	Album	Peak chart positions		Label
Year	Album	US Jazz	US Con. Jazz	Label
2014	Four80East – Live!	—	—	Boomtang
"—" denotes a recording that did not chart.

=== Extended plays ===
Year	Album	Peak chart positions		Label
Year	Album	US Jazz	US Con. Jazz	Label
2018	Four on the Floor – (EP)	—	11	Boomtang
"—" denotes a recording that did not chart.

== Singles ==
Year	Title	Peak chart positions	Album
Year	Title	Smooth Jazz Airplay	Album
2007	"Noodle Soup"	3	En Route
2010	"Down to It" (Jack Prybylski with Four80East)	25	Jack Prybylski – Out of the Box
2012	"M-Powered" (Marcus Anderson featuring Four80East)	12	Marcus Anderson – Now
2012	"Sandbar"	23	Off Duty
2015	"Cookie Strut"	5	Positraction
2019	"Cinco Cinco Seis"	1	Mixed Up
2020	"Ba Ba Brazil"	6	Straight Round
2023	"This Time Around"	2	Gonna Be Alright
2024	"Gonna Be Alright"	24	Gonna Be Alright
