= Neufeld-Occhipinti Jazz Orchestra =

- Also known as: NOJO
- Origin: Toronto, Ontario, Canada
- Genre: Jazz
- Years active: 1994–present
- Label: True North
- Website: www.nojomusic.com

The Neufeld-Occhipinti Jazz Orchestra (NOJO) is a Canadian jazz musical group based in Toronto, Ontario, Canada. In 2016, it had sixteen members. The group performs mainly music created and arranged by its members. Their present label is True North Records.

== History ==
The Neufeld-Occhipinti Jazz Orchestra was formed in 1994 by Michael Occhipinti and pianist Paul Neufeld. In 1995 the orchestra's first album was produced, and it won a Juno award for Best Contemporary Jazz Album.

In 1998, NOJO release the album You are Here, which was re-released in 2000.

In 2002, the band formed a smaller nine piece core group for touring.

NOJO has performed at the Umbria Jazz Winter Festival in Orvieto, Italy, The Jazz Standard in New York, and Montreal’s Festival International de Jazz.

In 2004, the group released the album City of Neighbourhoods, with Sam Rivers, on True North Records. The album received distribution in the United States through Rounder Records. In 2005, they performed at the Toronto Downtown Jazz Festival

The group has released five recordings of original music, each of which has been nominated for a Juno award.

In 2010, the orchestra released NOJO Explores the Dark Side of the Moon, which features the band performing original arrangements of Pink Floyd’s classic album.

NOJO has been positively reviewed by Don Heckman, Los Angeles Times, Larry Applebaum, JazzTimes, Frank Rubalino Cadence, Rinus van der Hayden, Brabants Dagblad, Netherlands, and Kerry Doole, The Jazz Report.

A number of well-known musicians have been guest performers with the orchestra, including saxophonist Joe Lovano, trombonist Ray Anderson, trumpeter Kenny Wheeler, clarinetist Don Byron and the late saxophonist Sam Rivers, who both recorded and toured with the ensemble.

== Awards and recognition ==
- 1996: winner of Juno Award, Best Contemporary Jazz Album, NOJO
- 1997: nomination for Juno Award, Best Contemporary Jazz Album, FireWater
- 1999: nomination for Juno Award, Best Contemporary Jazz Album, You Are Here (with Don Byron)
- 2003: nomination for Juno Award, Contemporary Jazz Album of the Year, Highwire
- 2005: nomination for Juno Award, Contemporary Jazz Album of the Year, City of Neighbourhoods (with Sam Rivers)

== Discography ==
- 1995: NOJO (Au)
- 1996: FireWater (Au)
- 1998: You Are Here with Don Byron (True North)
- 2002: Highwire with Don Byron and Hugh Marsh (True North)
- 2004: City of Neighbourhoods with Sam Rivers (True North)
- 2010: Explores the Dark Side of the Moon (True North)
