= John Stetch =

Canadian pianist

- Born: John Julian Stetchishin; 1966 (age 59–60); Edmonton, Alberta

John Stechishin, better known as John Stetch or John Julian (born 1966 in Edmonton, Alberta) is a Canadian jazz pianist. He is well known for having been nominated for several Juno Awards.

== Early life ==
Stetch's family is ethnically Ukrainian, and as a boy, Stetch played in ensembles at Ukrainian weddings and sang in community choirs. He studied reed instruments early on but concentrated on piano from his teenage years onward. After graduating from McGill University in 1991, he relocated to New York City.

== Career ==
Stetch's professional career has included performing and with Ed Jackson, Jan Jarczyk, Chris Kase, Rufus Reid, Akira Tana, Alain Trudel, Mark Turner, and Johannes Weidenmuller.

Stetch won the Du Maurier Grand Prix at the Montreal Jazz Festival in 1998, was second place in the 1993 Thelonious Monk Composer's Competition, and has been nominated for six Juno Awards in jazz. Stetch was a faculty member at Cornell University and at the Vancouver Symphony Orchestra School of Music.

In March of 2021, Stetch was investigated for hosting a conspiracist party. Amidst social gathering restrictions due to the COVID-19 pandemic, he hosted a gathering in his apartment with approximately 14 people without masks, in close quarters. He has since been suspended by the Vancouver Symphony Orchestra School of Music during investigations.

== Discography ==
- Rectangle Man (Terra Nova, 1992)
- Carpathian Blues (Terra Nova, 1994)
- Stetching Out (Terra Nova, 1996)
- Kolomeyka Fantasy (Global Village, 1996)
- Green Grove (Justin Time, 1999)
- Heavens Of A Hundred Days (Justin Time, 2000)
- Ukrainianism (Justin Time, 2002)
- Standards (Justin Time, 2003)
- Exponentially Monk (Justin Time, 2004)
- Bruxin' (Justin Time, 2006)
- TV Trio (2008)
- Fabled States (Addo Records, 2011)
- Off With The Cuffs (Addo Records, 2013)
- Improvisations (2015)
- Ballads (2019)
- Black Sea Suite (2019)
