= Chris Tarry =

Canadian bass guitarist (born 1970)

- Born: 24 August 1970 (age 56); Swift Current, Saskatchewan, Canada
- Genre: Jazz
- Occupation: Musician
- Instrument: Bass guitar
- Member of: Metalwood
- Website: christarry.com

Chris Tarry (born 24 August 1970) is a Canadian bass guitarist who is a member of the band Metalwood. Since 1993 he has led the Chris Tarry Group.

== Discography ==
=== As leader ===
- Unition (Adam, 1996)
- Sponge with Dylan van der Schyff (Spool, 1998)
- Project 33 (Black Hen, 2002)
- Sorry to Be Strange (Cellar Live, 2006)
- Almost Certainly Dreaming (Nineteen-eight, 2008)

=== As sideman ===
With Metalwood

- Metalwood (Maximum, 1997)
- 2 (Maximum, 1998)
- The Recline (Telarc, 2001)
- Twenty (Cellar Live, 2016)

With Peggy Lee Band

- The Peggy Lee Band (Spool, 1999)
- Sounds from the Big House (Spool, 2002)
