= Montréal Bistro =

The Montréal Bistro was a jazz club located at 65 Sherbourne Street in Toronto, Ontario. Operating between 1979 and 2006, it was one of Toronto's preeminent jazz clubs and featured many internationally renowned jazz musicians.

== History ==
The Montreal Bistro opened in 1979. The owners were a trio of Montrealers headed by David Bowen, who wanted to recreate a Montreal night spot in Toronto. The presence of tourtiere and pea soup on the menu by original Chef Marino Niksic (previously of Fenton's) were augmented by other items of Nouvelle Cuisine.

One side of the venue was a restaurant, the other a hot bar/club.

Owners Lothar and Brigitte Lang bought the Montréal Bistro in April 1981.

Throughout the club's history musicians such as Oscar Peterson, Diana Krall, Jay McShann, and Joshua Redman performed at the venue. Late in its existence the club also hosted concerts featuring Doug Riley that were organized by CBC Radio host Danny Finkleman.

After a dispute with the landlord, the Langs closed the Bistro on 5 July 2006. The same year the club closed, the Langs received a lifetime achievement award at the National Jazz Awards.

== Live recordings ==
- Ray Bryant - North of the Border (1997)
- Gene DiNovi - Live at the Montreal Bistro (1995)
- Geoff Keezer - Trio (1993)
- Dave McMurdo - Live at the Montreal Bistro (1992)
- Dave McMurdo - Fire and Song (1996)
- Dave McMurdo - Just for Now (2001)
- Various Artists - Finkleman's 45s: The Doug Riley Sessions, Volume 1 (2000)
- Various Artists - Finkleman's 45s: The Doug Riley Sessions, Volume 2 (2001)
- Kenny Wheeler and Sonny Greenwich - Kenny and Sonny Live at the Montreal Bistro (1993 and 1997)
