= Russell Braun =

Canadian opera singer

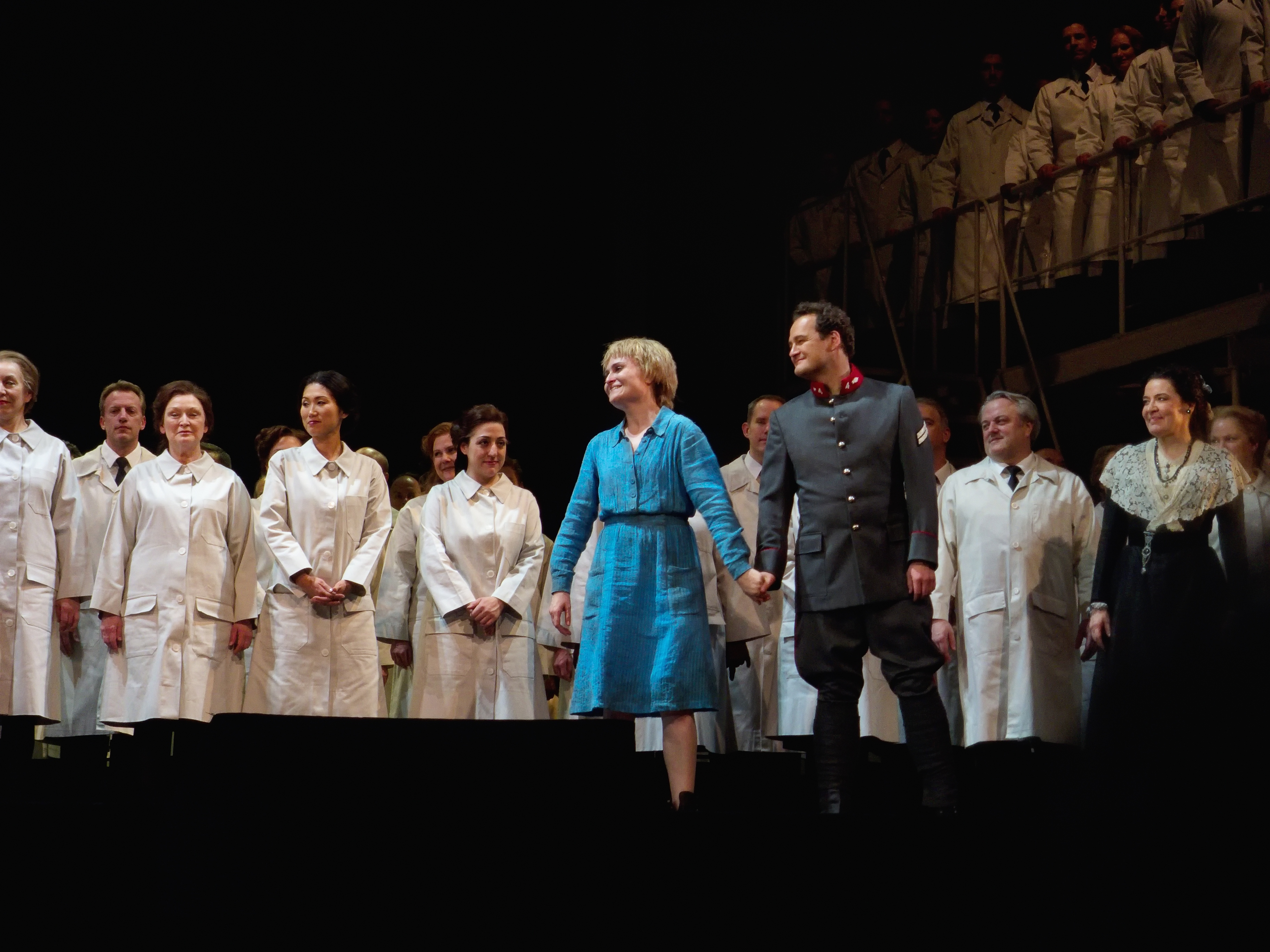
- Marina Poplavskaya and Russell Braun in Gounod's Faust, Metropolitan Opera House, 2011

Background information
- Born: July 19, 1965 (age 60); Frankfurt, Germany
- Genres: Opera
- Occupation: baritone
- Instrument: Vocals

Russell Braun OC (born 19 July 1965) is a Canadian operatic lyric baritone and conductor (music), and Juno Award winner.

Much sought after as a soloist and for opera roles, Russell Braun performs regularly at the Metropolitan Opera, the Salzburg Festival, the Lyric Opera of Chicago, l'Opéra de Paris, the San Diego Opera, the San Francisco Opera and the Canadian Opera Company in Toronto.

Braun is a graduate of the Faculty of Music at the University of Toronto, and lives in Toronto.

As of 2025, Braun is also working as a conductor, leading Edmonton Opera's production of Wagner's Die Walkure.

He is the son of famous Canadian baritone Victor Braun. He is married to pianist Carolyn Maule, with whom he performs regularly.

In 2016, he was appointed as an Officer of the Order of Canada.
