= Bernie Senensky =

Canadian jazz pianist, organist, and composer

- Born: Bernard Melvin Senensky; December 31, 1944 (age 81); Winnipeg, Manitoba, Canada
- Genre: Jazz
- Occupations: Musician, composer
- Instruments: Piano, organ
- Years active: 1970s–present

Bernard Melvin Senensky (born December 31, 1944) is a Canadian jazz pianist, organist, and composer.

== Life and career ==
Senensky was born in Winnipeg, Manitoba, on December 31, 1944. He received classical piano lessons from the age of nine and became interested in jazz around age 15. He had one jazz teacher, and thereafter was self-taught.

He moved permanently to Toronto in 1968. He played briefly with high-profile visiting musicians, including Chet Baker, Art Blakey, Art Farmer, and Art Pepper. Senensky played with Moe Koffman between 1980 and 2000, and they toured internationally for several years. Senensky has recorded several small group albums since 1975.

== Playing style and influences ==
Senensky described himself as "essentially a bebop player, and beyond. My heroes are anyone from Bud Powell to McCoy Tyner to Keith Jarrett and Herbie Hancock". Senensky was influenced on organ by Larry Goldings, Mike LeDonne, and Larry Young. The New Grove Dictionary of Jazz states that "His playing is characterized by his obvious comfort in a wide range of styles, from swing to the assertive post-bop of his own groups."

== Discography ==
An asterisk (*) indicates that the year is that of release.

=== As leader/co-leader ===
Year recorded	Title	Label	Personnel/Notes
1975	New Life	PM	Trio, with Michel Donato (bass), Marty Morell (drums)
1989	Friday the 14th	Unity	Trio, with Kieran Overs (bass), Barry Elmes (drums)
1991	Re: Action	Unity	Septet
1991	Homeland	Timeless	Quartet, with Gary Bartz (alto sax, soprano sax), Harvie Swartz (bass), Akira Tana (drums)
1993	Wheel Within a Wheel	Timeless	Quartet, with Bobby Watson (alto sax, soprano sax), Ray Drummond (bass), Marvin "Smitty" Smith (drums)
1996	Rhapsody	Timeless	Trio, with Jim Vivian (bass), Bob Moses (drums)
1995	New Horizons	Timeless	Quintet, with Kirk McDonald (sax), Eddie Henderson (trumpet), Neil Swainson (bass), Jerry Fuller (drums)
2022	Don't Look Back	Cellar Live	Quintet with Bob Mover (alto sax), Sam Noto (trumpet), Neil Swainson (bass), Barry Elmes (drums)
2023	Moment To Moment	Cellar Live	Quartet with Eric Alexander (sax), Kieran Overs (bass on 1,3,4,6,7 & 8), Joe Farnsworth (drums on 1,3,4,6,7 & 8), Dave Young (bass on 2 & 5), Morgan Childs (drums on 2 & 5)

Main source:
