= Mike Murley =

Canadian jazz saxophonist and composer

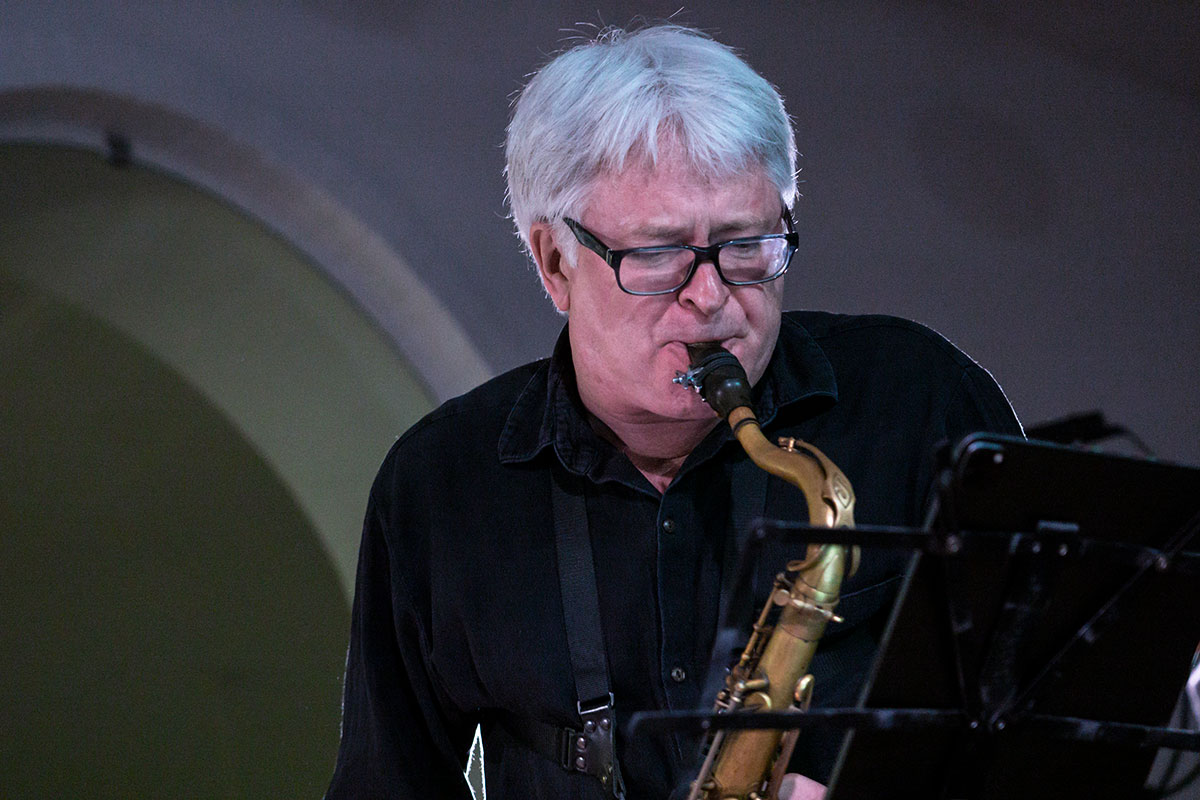

Background information
- Born: December 12, 1961 (age 64); Windsor, Nova Scotia, Canada
- Genres: Jazz
- Occupations: Musician, composer
- Instruments: Tenor saxophone, soprano saxophone
- Website: mikemurley.com

Mike Murley (born December 12, 1961) is a Canadian jazz saxophonist and composer from Windsor, Nova Scotia who was a member of the Shuffle Demons from 1984 to 1989 and Time Warp.

== Education ==
He graduated from the music program at York University in Toronto in 1986 with a BFA. He also studied saxophone with Don Palmer in Halifax, Pat LaBarbera in Toronto, and Dave Liebman at the Banff Centre for Arts and Creativity and New York City. He studied improvisation and composition with Dave Holland in Banff and New York City.

== Career ==
He played with the Shuffle Demons from 1984–1989 and in Time Warp. He has also been a sideman for David Occhipinti, David Braid, Rob McConnell, Metalwood, and Harrison Squared (with Harry Vetro and Harrison Argatoff). His main instrument is tenor saxophone, which he plays in the Murley/Braid Quartet. He has received several Juno Awards.
