= Metalwood =

Canadian jazz band

- Origin: Toronto, Ontario, Canada
- Genre: Jazz fusion
- Labels: Maximum Jazz, Maximum Music, Blue Thumb
- Members: Mike Murley; Brad Turner; Ian Froman; Chris Tarry

Metalwood is a Canadian jazz band from Toronto, Ontario. The band was active in the late 1990s and early 2000s, and reunited in 2016. The members are saxophonist Mike Murley, pianist/trumpeter Brad Turner, bassist Chris Tarry, and drummer Ian Froman.

== History ==
Metalwood was formed in Toronto in 1997. The group signed with Brian Watson's Maximum Music Group.

The members performed together until 2003, and recorded six albums of jazz music. Their first two albums 1997's Metalwood and Metalwood 2 in 1998, each won a Juno Award for best contemporary jazz album.

In 2016, Metalwood reunited, performing in Toronto and recording a new album, Twenty. Later that year the band went on tour to support the album, which won a Juno Award as best group jazz album of the year.

== Awards and recognition ==
- 1998: Juno Award, Best Contemporary Jazz Album, Metalwood
- 1999: Juno Award, Best Contemporary Jazz Album, Metalwood 2
- 2017: Juno Award, Best Jazz Album - Group Twenty

== Discography ==
- 1997: Metalwood
- 1998: Metalwood 2
- 1999: Metalwood Live
- 2001: Metalwood 3
- 2001: Recline
- 2003: Chronic
- 2016: Twenty
