= Hugh Fraser (musician) =

Canadian jazz musician (1958–2020)

- Born: October 26, 1958; Victoria, British Columbia, Canada
- Died: June 17, 2020 (aged 61); Vancouver, British Columbia, Canada
- Genres: Jazz
- Instruments: Piano, trombone

Hugh Alexander Fraser (October 26, 1958 – June 17, 2020) was a Canadian jazz musician known for his work as a pianist, trombonist and composer.

== Early life and education ==
Born in Victoria, British Columbia, Fraser studied with Dave Robbins in Vancouver, Slide Hampton in New York, and Kenny Wheeler in London. He also attended the Banff Centre for Arts and Creativity.

== Career ==
Fraser began teaching at the Banff Centre for Arts and Creativity in 1986 and was appointed head of the jazz program in 1991. He also held teaching appointments in jazz education at the Royal Academy of Music, the University of Ulster, University of Victoria, and the Victoria Conservatory of Music.

Early in his career, Fraser formed the Vancouver Ensemble of Jazz Improvisation (VEJI), a big band that went on to win the open class at the Canadian Stage Band Festival in 1981. The Hugh Fraser Quintet, a hard-bop band which drew members from VEJI, toured widely and appeared frequently at Canadian and International jazz festivals. Fraser performed with Jaki Byard, Clark Terry, Dizzy Gillespie, Maynard Ferguson, Billy Eckstine, and many other well known jazz musicians.

== Personal life ==
In 2017, Fraser was diagnosed with cancer, but continued to perform. He died on 17 June 2020 in Vancouver, British Columbia at the age of 62.

== Awards ==
- Looking Up - 1989 Juno Award for Best Jazz Album (winner)
- Pas de Problem - 1990 Juno Award for Best Jazz Album (nominated)
- In The Mean Time - 1998 Juno Award for Best Mainstream Jazz Album (winner)

== Discography ==
Solo/The Hugh Fraser Quintet

- Looking Up (1987)
- Pas de Problemes (1988)
- The Sensorium Suite (1992)
- Trinity (1992)
- Sensorium Two (1993)
- Red and Blue (1995)
- In the Meantime (1997)
- Back to Back (1998)
- Stardust Suite (2000)
- A Night in Vancouver (2004)
- Hugh Fraser's Bonehenge (2005)
- Concerto (2012)

With VEJI

- VEJI (1980)
- Classic VEJI (1986)
- VEJI Now! (1990)
- V (1999)
- Big Works (2002)

== Compositions ==
Fraser composed over 200 jazz works. Over 100 of his compositions have been recorded.
