= Dave Young (bassist) =

Canadian double bassist (born 1940)

- Born: David Anthony Young; January 29, 1940 (age 86); Winnipeg, Manitoba, Canada
- Genre: Jazz
- Instruments: Double bass

David Anthony Young (born January 29, 1940) is a Canadian double bassist.

== Career ==
Young played with jazz guitarist Lenny Breau in local gigs before studying music at Berklee College of Music and the Royal Conservatory of Music in the 1960s. He played with a number of Canadian symphony orchestras in the 1970s and worked extensively in jazz with Kenny Barron, Gene DiNovi, Wray Downes, Tommy Flanagan, Oliver Jones, and Oscar Peterson. He was honoured as a Young Member of the Order of Canada in 2006. He has the technique of performing bowed solos like Paul Chambers.

Young has been nominated for nine Juno Awards, winning the 1994 Best Mainstream Jazz Album for Fables and Dreams with the Phil Dwyer Quartet.

== Awards and nominations ==
- Au Privave - Wray Downes & Dave Young – Best Jazz Album (nominated, 1982)
- Fables and Dreams – Dave Young / Phil Dwyer Quartet – Best Mainstream Jazz Album (winner, 1984)
- Live at Bourbon St. – Lenny Breau with Dave Young – Best Mainstream Jazz Album (nominated, 1997)
- Two By Two, Piano Bass Duets, Vol. II – Dave Young – Best Mainstream Jazz Album (nominated, 1997)
- Inner Urge – Dave Young Trio – Best Mainstream Jazz Album (nominated, 1999)
- Mainly Mingus – Dave Young Quintet – Traditional Jazz Album of the Year (nominated, 2006)
- Aspects of Oscar – Dave Young Quintet – Traditional Jazz Album of the Year (nominated, 2012)
- Volume One – Dave Young/Terry Promane Octet – Traditional Jazz Album of the Year (nominated, 2013)
- One Way Up – Dave Young Quintet – Jazz Album of the Year: Group (nominated, 2017)
