= Top o' the Senator =

Jazz club in Toronto, Canada

The Top o' the Senator was a jazz club located at 251 Victoria Street in Toronto, Ontario. Operating between 1990 and 2005, it was one of Toronto's preeminent jazz clubs and featured many internationally renowned musicians.

== History ==
The Top o' the Senator's history dates back to 1929, the year Robert Angeloff opened the Busy Bee Diner at 249 Victoria Street. The restaurant was later bought by George Nicolau and in 1948 remodeled and renamed the Senator. In 1984 the business was bought by Bob Sniderman - son of Sam Sniderman - and in 1989 the Senator Steakhouse was added next door. In June 1990, above the Steakhouse, Sniderman opened the jazz club Top o' the Senator. The jazz club was managed by Sybil Walker and during its time hosted musicians including Shirley Horn, [Joe Pass (musician), Lou Donaldson, Terence Blanchard and Ray Brown. The club also showcased many of Canada's best musicians - Rob McConnell, Ed Bickert, Diana Krall and Rene Rosnes.

The Top o' the Senator and Senator Steakhouse closed in March 2005. In April 2013 the Jazz Bistro opened in the space previously occupied by the Senator. The new club is owned by Colin and Joan Hunter. Sybil Walker was hired as the manager.

== Live recordings ==
- Brian Dickinson - Live at the Senator (1994)
- Steve Koven - Live at the Senator (1997)
- Mike Murley, Ed Bickert, and Steve Wallace - Live at the Senator (1999)
- David Braid - Vivid: The David Braid Sextet Live (2003)
- David Braid - Zhen: The David Braid Sextet Live Vol.2 (2004)
- Adrean Farrugia - Live at the Senator (2004)
