= Jodi Proznick =

Canadian jazz bassist and educator (born 1975)

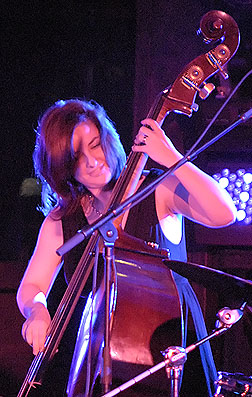

Background information
- Born: October 23, 1975 (age 50); Surrey, British Columbia, Canada
- Genres: Jazz
- Occupations: Musician, composer, educator, producer
- Instruments: Double bass, electric bass
- Years active: 1993–present
- Labels: Cellar Music, Rhea Records
- Member of: Jodi Proznick Quartet, Triology, The Ostara Project
- Spouse: Tilden Webb (m. 2004)
- Website: jodiproznick.com

Jodi Proznick (born October 23, 1975) is a Canadian jazz bassist, composer and educator. In 2019 she was named Jazz Artist of the Year at the Western Canadian Music Awards, and she has been nominated for four Juno Awards.

Proznick is the Director of Jazz Studies at the VSO School of Music. For her contribution to music education in British Columbia she received the Lieutenant Governor's Arts and Music Award in 2022.

== Career ==
Proznick was born in Surrey, British Columbia. She began playing double bass at thirteen and was taught by her father, musician and educator David Proznick. While attending Semiahmoo Secondary School, she won the General Motors Award of Excellence in 1993. She attended McGill University from 1993 to 1998, where she met her future bandmates: drummer Jesse Cahill, tenor saxophonist Steve Kaldestad, and pianist Tilden Webb whom she married in 2004. While in Montreal, she worked with Christine Jensen, Kelly Jefferson, Ranee Lee, André White, Greg Clayton, and other prominent Montreal jazz artists. She was a winner of the IAJE Sisters in Jazz Competition in 1998.

Proznick moved to Vancouver in 2000, where she and Webb became leading members of the Vancouver jazz scene and the Cellar Music record label. Proznick has appeared on and produced over 40 records. In 2005 she obtained a Master of Education in Arts Education at Simon Fraser University.

In 2004, the Jodi Proznick Quartet received the Galaxie Rising Star Award at the Vancouver International Jazz Festival. Proznick released her first record as a leader, Foundations, in 2006, to critical acclaim. Foundations won Album of the Year and Acoustic Group of the Year at the 2008 National Jazz Awards, and was nominated for Traditional Jazz Album of the Year at the 2009 Juno Awards. Proznick won Bassist of the Year at the National Jazz Awards in 2008 and 2009.

In 2008, Proznick co-founded Triology alongside guitarist Bill Coon and pianist Miles Black. The group has recorded three albums and is known for their impromptu arrangements of jazz standards.

In 2017, Proznick released her second album as a leader, Sun Songs, which was inspired by the personal struggle that ensued after her mother's diagnosis of early onset dementia, as well as the arrival of her firstborn son. The album explores the duality of life and death, and finding beauty amid hardship. Sun Songs features her quartet alongside vocalist Laila Biali. The album earned Proznick her second Juno nomination in 2019 for Vocal Jazz Album.

Proznick co-founded the Ostara Project with pianist Amanda Tosoff in 2022, an all-female Canadian jazz supergroup. Ostara released their self-titled debut album in 2022. The Ostara Project was nominated for Vocal Jazz Album of the Year at the 2023 Juno Awards, marking Proznick's third overall nomination. Two albums centered around ancestry and cultural backgrounds, Roots and Wings, followed in 2025. The Ostara Project has featured musicians such as Allison Au, Rachel Therrien, Jocelyn Gould, Sanah Kadoura, Joanna Majoko, Valerie Lacombe, Laila Biali, Shruti Ramani, Emilie-Claire Barlow, Dawn Pemberton, Terri-Lynn Williams-Davidson, Virginia MacDonald, Marianne Trudel and Kim Zombik.

Proznick is a member of Four Jays, a contemporary chamber ensemble, and Jasmine Jazz, a collaboration with the Vancouver Chinese Music Ensemble, both of whom have been nominated for Western Canadian Music Awards. She is a member of the Indo-Jazz fusion quartet Raagaverse, whose 2024 debut album Jaya earned Proznick her fourth Juno nomination.

In her career, Proznick has performed and/or recorded with musicians including Michael Bublé, Sarah McLachlan, George Coleman, Ed Thigpen, Seamus Blake, George Colligan, Eddie Daniels, Peter Bernstein, Eddie Henderson, Sheila Jordan, David "Fathead" Newman, Bill Henderson, Harold Mabern, Michael Feinstein, Ingrid Jensen, Ryan Kisor, Kitty Margolis, Charles McPherson, Byron Stripling, Bucky Pizzarelli, Jeff Hamilton, Shabaka Hutchings, Mark Murphy, Eric Alexander, Lewis Nash, Houston Person, Jim Rotondi, Laila Biali, Brian Dickinson, Phil Dwyer, Kirk MacDonald, Celso Machado, Ian McDougall, Ron Paley, Don Thompson, Guido Basso, P. J. Perry, Dee Daniels, and Sal Fererras. She has performed with the Vancouver Symphony Orchestra, the Vancouver Chamber Choir, and the Elektra Women's Choir. She accompanied Michael Bublé and Sarah McLachlan at the 2010 Winter Olympics in Vancouver. She has been featured on over 40 recordings as a side person.

Proznick is the Director of Jazz Studies at the VSO School of Music. She has been a guest adjudicator and clinician at festivals, colleges, universities, and conferences across Canada, such as the Banff Centre for Arts and Creativity. She has taught at Capilano University and Kwantlen Polytechnic University. From 2019 to 2020, she was the Manager of Education and Community Outreach for the Vancouver Symphony Orchestra.

In 2022, Proznick was a recipient of the Lieutenant Governor's Arts and Music Award for her contribution to music education in British Columbia.

== Awards and honors ==
Year	Nominee/work	Award	Result
1993	Herself	General Motors Award of Excellence	Recipient
1998	Herself	IAJE Sisters in Jazz Competition	Won
2004	Jodi Proznick Quartet	Galaxie Rising Star Award, Vancouver International Jazz Festival	Recipient
2008	Foundations	Traditional Jazz Album of the Year, Juno Awards	Nominated
2008	Jodi Proznick Quartet	Acoustic Group of the Year, National Jazz Awards	Won
2008	Foundations	Record of the Year, National Jazz Awards	Won
2008	Herself	Bassist of the Year, National Jazz Awards	Won
2009	Herself	Bassist of the Year, National Jazz Awards	Won
2019	Sun Songs	Vocal Jazz Album of the Year, Juno Awards	Nominated
2019	Herself	Jazz Artist of the Year, Western Canadian Music Awards	Won
2021	Vetta Chamber Music (as sidewoman)	Classical Artist/Ensemble of the Year, Western Canadian Music Awards	Nominated
2022	Herself	Lieutenant Governor's Arts and Music Awards	Recipient
2023	The Ostara Project	Vocal Jazz Album of the Year, Juno Awards	Nominated
2023	Jasmine Jazz (as sidewoman)	Instrumental Artist of the Year, Western Canadian Music Awards	Won
2025	Jaya – Raagaverse (as sidewoman)	Jazz Album of the Year - Group, Juno Awards	Nominated
2025	Jaya – Raagaverse (as sidewoman)	Jazz Artist of the Year, Western Canadian Music Awards	Nominated
2026	Roots – Ostara Project (co-leader)	Jazz Artist of the Year, Western Canadian Music Awards	Nominated

== Discography ==
=== As leader or co-leader ===
- 2006 – Foundations
- 2014 – Triology (with Triology)
- 2017 – Sun Songs
- 2019 – Stairway to the Stars (with Triology)
- 2022 – The Ostara Project (with The Ostara Project)
- 2025 – Roots (with The Ostara Project)
- 2025 – The Slow Road (with Triology featuring Scott Hamilton)

=== As sidewoman ===
- 1998 – Something Personal – The McGill Jazz Orchestra Directed by Gordon Foote
- 1999 – Realtime – Sienna Dahlen
- 2002 – Little Temptations – Sienna Dahlen
- 2003 – Live at the Cellar – Charles McPherson Quartet
- 2004 – Cellar Groove – Tilden Webb Trio with David Fathead Newman
- 2005 – The Time Is Now – Joel Haynes Trio
- 2005 - Live from Lotus Land – Mike Rud
- 2006 – Run with It – James Danderfer Group
- 2007 – Chances Are – Jane Fair
- 2007 – Feel This – Kia Kadiri
- 2007 – Contemplation – Christie Grace
- 2008 – No Boundaries – Bill Coon and Ron Peters
- 2008 – Transitions – Joel Haynes Trio with Seamus Blake
- 2008 – Live at the Cellar, Vol. 1 – George Evans
- 2008 – It's Always You – Luis Geraldo
- 2009 – Memory Cafe – Steve Maddock
- 2009 – Fresh – Bria Skonberg
- 2009 – Low Down, West Broadway – Joe Coughlin
- 2009 – Too Much to Do – Nick La Riviere
- 2010 – Sounds of Vancouver 2010: Opening Ceremony Commemorative Album – The 2010 Vancouver Olympic Orchestra
- 2010 – Sounds of Vancouver 2010: Closing Ceremony Commemorative Album – The 2010 Vancouver Olympic Orchestra
- 2010 – Blow-Up – Steve Kaldestad Quartet
- 2010 – Chez Nous: Christmas with Elektra – Elektra Women's Choir
- 2011 – Just Like That – Cory Weeds with the Tilden Webb Trio
- 2011 – Down in the Bottom – The Night Crawlers with the Big Band Sound
- 2011 – Anywhere But Here – Janice Finlay
- 2012 – JazzSpeak – Ralf Buschmeyer
- 2012 – Sunalta – Jon McCaslin
- 2012 – Live at the Cellar – Amanda Tosoff
- 2013 – Live at Cory Weeds' Cellar Jazz Club – Peter Bernstein with the Tilden Webb Trio
- 2014 – Change Partners: Live at the Yardbird Suite – Champian Fulton
- 2014 – Easy Sailing – Oliver Gannon Quartet
- 2014 – Invitations – Jerrold Dubyk Quintet
- 2015 – Trio3 YVR – Jon McCaslin
- 2015 – Drinky – Tim Tamashiro
- 2016 – This Bitter Earth – Jaclyn Guillou
- 2017 – Keep Christmas With You – Katherine Penfold
- 2018 – Step Up – Miles Black Quartet and David Rehorick
- 2019 – Loving Memory – Gary Macdonald
- 2020 – Just One Moment – Miles Black Quartet and David Rehorick
- 2021 – Live at Cory Weeds' Cellar Jazz Club – Joe Magnarelli and Gary Smulyan with the Tilden Webb Trio
- 2021 – Tango-Klezmer-Jazz – Vetta Chamber Music (featuring Four Jays)
- 2022 – Love for Connoisseurs – Angela Verbrugge
- 2023 – Jasmine Jazz – Vancouver Chinese Music Ensemble ft. Jodi Proznick Trio
- 2023 – Within the Stream – Noah Franche-Nolan
- 2024 – Jaya – Raagaverse
- 2024 – Somewhere – Angela Verbrugge
- 2024 – Dunbar Heights – Allison Au Trio
