= Vancouver International Jazz Festival =

Annual music festival held in Vancouver, British Columbia, Canada

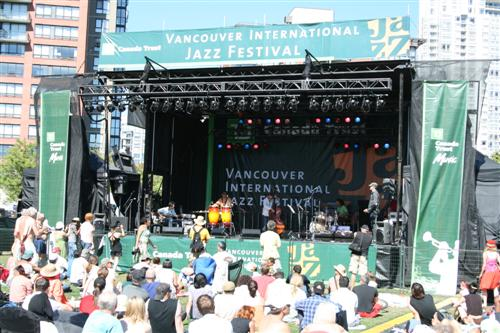
- 2008 festival stage in Yaletown
- Status: Active
- Genre: Music festival
- Locations: Vancouver, British Columbia
- Inaugurated: 1986; 40 years ago
- Organizer: Coastal Jazz
- Website: www.coastaljazz.ca

The Vancouver International Jazz Festival is a jazz festival held every summer in Vancouver, British Columbia, Canada.

The inaugural festival was held in 1985. In 1986 the Coastal Jazz and Blues Society, the festival's governing organization, partnered with Expo 86 to produce the first annual international festival. Performers have included Miles Davis, Wynton Marsalis, Julian Lage, and The Bad Plus. As well as many local artists including Brad Turner, Jodi Proznick, Cory Weeds, Bill Coon, Oliver Gannon, Daniel Hersog, and Steve Kaldestad.

The jazz festival has been held every year since, becoming the largest such festival in British Columbia. Over 1,000 volunteers help in producing the event, which includes performances in parks, community centres, concert halls, clubs, public plazas, and in streets of various neighbourhoods.

== History ==
The festival grew out of a local jazz scene that centred on Vancouver Co-op Radio (CFRO-FM), a community radio station, in the early 1980s. The Pacific Jazz and Blues Association was formed in 1984 and hosted the Pacific Jazz and Blues Festival, which showcased regional jazz and blues artists in addition to some international jazz musicians. The inaugural festival was held in 1985, featuring primarily local artists. By 1986, the group had changed its name to the Coastal Jazz and Blues Society, secured corporate sponsorship, and partnered with Expo 86 to produce the first annual Vancouver International Jazz Festival. The inaugural festival included performances by Miles Davis, Wynton Marsalis, Bobby McFerrin, Tito Puente, Tony Williams, Albert Collins, and John Mayall and the Bluesbreakers.

For many years, TD Canada Trust was a title sponsor of the festival, during which it was known as the TD Vancouver International Jazz Festival. In 2024, TD Canada Trust discontinued its sponsorship of the Vancouver International Jazz Festival, as well as its sponsorship of many jazz festivals across Canada, including the Toronto Jazz Festival, and Ottawa Jazz Festival.

== Sounds of Youth Stage ==
During the annual festival, the Sounds of Youth stage features big bands from local high schools including Semiahmoo Secondary School, St. Thomas Aquinas Regional Secondary School, St. Thomas More Collegiate, and Langley Fine Arts School.

== Past Lineups ==
Year	Dates	Featured Artists	Ref.
2016	June 24 – July 3	Hiromi Uehara; Joe Lovano; Lauryn Hill; Sarah McLachlan; Neko Case, K.d. lang, Laura Veirs; Tedeschi Trucks Band; Tomeka Reid	
2017	June 22 – July 2	Branford Marsalis with the Vancouver Symphony Orchestra; Ziggy Marley; Postmodern Jukebox; Seu Jorge; Tommy Emmanuel; Emmet Cohen with Ron Carter; Brad Turner; Ingrid Jensen, Christine Jensen, and Ben Monder; Donny McCaslin	
2018	June 22 – July 1	Kamasi Washington; Julian Lage; Emmet Cohen; Russell Malone; John Korsrud's Hard Rubber Orchestra	
2019		Elisapie; Wu-Tang Clan; The Roots; Melissa Aldana; Herbie Hancock; Too Many Zooz; Joel Ross; Audrey Ochoa	
2020	Cancelled due to COVID-19 pandemic		
2021	June 25 – July 2	Snotty Nose Rez Kids; Cory Weeds; Bill Coon; Brad Turner; Ayla Tesler-Mabe; John Gross	
2022		Cécile McLorin Salvant; GoGo Penguin; Lucinda Williams; Julian Lage	
2023	June 23 – July 2	Arooj Aftab, Vijay Iyer, and Shahzad Ismaily; The Bad Plus; BadBadNotGood; Mali Obomsawin; Isaiah Collier; Jodi Proznick with Ostara Project; Caity Gyorgy; Daniel Hersog Jazz Orchestra	
2024	June 21 – July 2	Lakecia Benjamin; John Korsrud; Laraaji; Killer Mike	
2025	June 20 – July 1	Susie Ibarra; François Houle; Immanuel Wilkins; Bill Frisell; Marquis Hill; Nubya Garcia; Cowboy Bebop Bebop Band plays the music of Cowboy Bebop	
