= Jon Bentley (saxophonist) =

Canadian jazz saxophonist

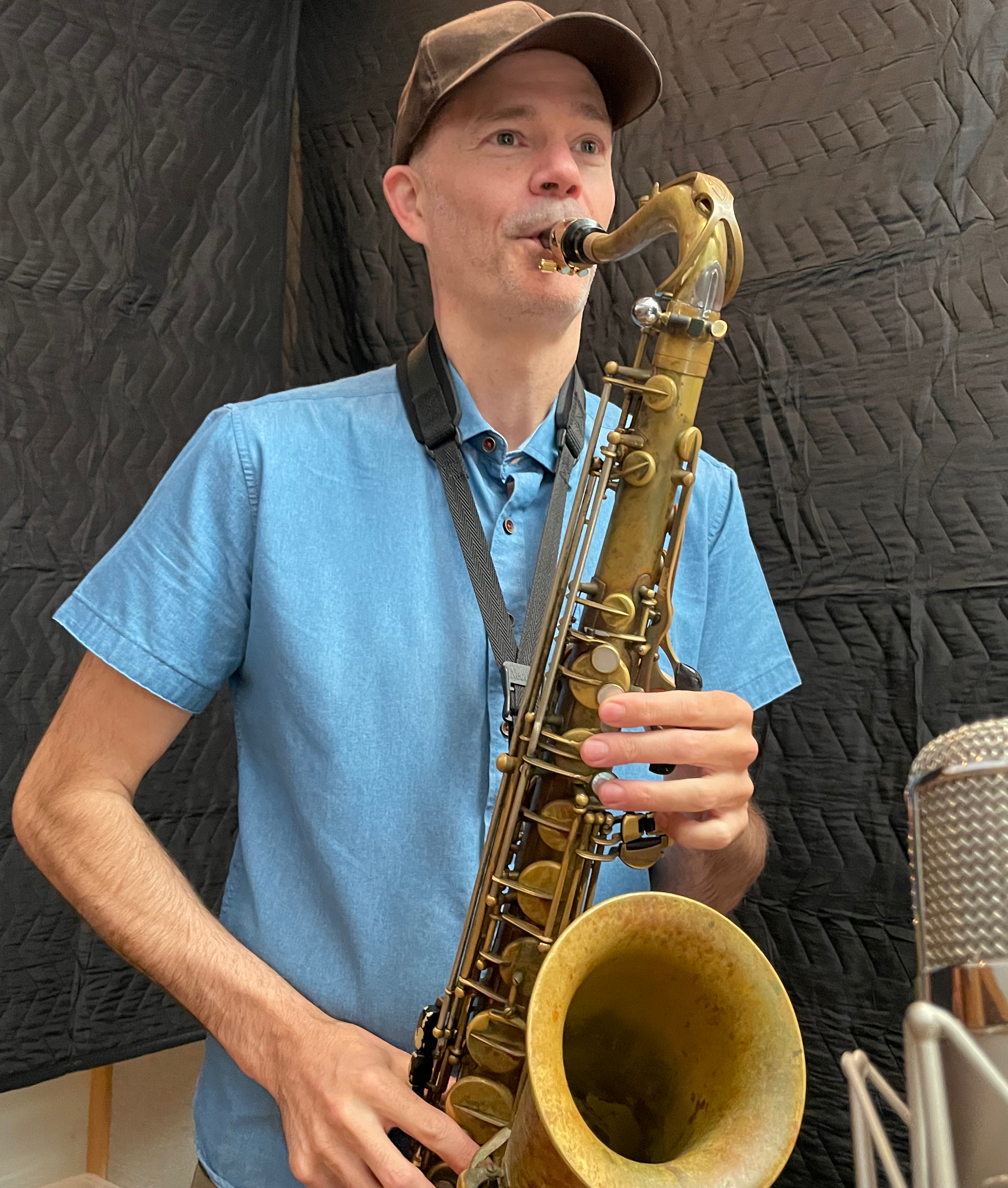

Background information
- Born: October 30, 1973 (age 52)
- Genres: Jazz
- Occupation: Professional Musician
- Instruments: Tenor Saxophone, Soprano Saxophone
- Website: Official website

Jon Bentley is a professional Canadian jazz saxophonist based in Vancouver, BC. He is a two time Juno Awards nominated artist as well as a four time recipient of Western Canadian Music Awards nominations. Bentley is known for performing and/or recording with artists such as Kenny Wheeler, Dave Douglas, Seamus Blake, Brad Turner, Eddie Daniels, Jodi Proznick, Vancouver Symphony Orchestra, Metalwood, John Korsrud, Hard Rubber Orchestra, Mark Helias, Steve Kaldestad, The Temptations, and Frankie Valli.

Since 1995, he has performed professionally in concerts across Canada, USA, England, and Europe and has been featured on CBC Radio with live and studio recordings for Tonic, The Signal, Jazzbeat, West Coast Performance, Hot Air, and Arts National.

Bentley received his bachelor's degree in Saxophone Jazz Performance from Capilano University in Vancouver in 1998. He has studied the tenor saxophone both in Vancouver and in New York with saxophonist Seamus Blake. Bentley has received numerous studying, recording, performing, and travel Canada Council for the Arts awards, including an extended grant to study composition and arranging with Canadian trumpeter/ composer Kenny Wheeler in London, England.

Discography
Year released	Title	Artist	Label	Notes	Ref
2025	Go Ahead!	Jon Bentley	Cellar Music Group	Western Canadian Music Awards Nominated	
2023	Dark Night, Bright Stars	Sharon Minemoto	Cellar Music Group		
2023	A Walk To Meryton	Arne Eigenfeldt	Redshift Records		
2023	A Giving Way	Peggy Lee Band	Songlines Recordings		
2022	String Songs	Laura Crema & Bill Coon	Independent		
2022	Iguana	Hard Rubber Orchestra	Redshift Records	Juno Awards Nominated	
2021	Flicker Down	Waxwing	Songlines Recordings	Western Canadian Music Awards Nominated	
2020	Crossing Time	Chris Gestrin	Phonometrograph		
2019	Sweetest Thing	Katherine Penfold	Nettwerk Music Group		
2018	Echo Painting	Peggy Lee	Songlines Recordings		
2016	Safe Travels	Sharon Minemoto	Pagetown Records		
2015	A Bowl Of Sixty Taxidermists	Waxwing	Songlines Recordings		
2015	Ancient Lights	Paul Keeling	Independent	West Coast Music Award Nominated	
2012	Invitation	Peggy Lee Band	Drip Audio	Juno Awards Nominated	
2009	New Code	Peggy Lee Band	Drip Audio		
2007	After the City Has Gone: Quiet	Chris Gestrin	Songlines Recordings		
2007	Escondido Dreams	Wilson/Lee/Bentley	Drip Audio		
2007	Songs and Melodies	Jillian Lebeck	Talie Records		
2007	Forward Motion	Fred Stride Jazz Orchestra	Cellar Live		
2006	Live at the Cellar	UGETSU	Cellar Live		
2004	Motions	Jon Bentley Quintet	Independent		
2003	Living in Pieces	Jillian Lebeck	Talie Records		
2002	Stillpoint	Chris Gestrin	Songlines Recordings		
2000	Simulasticity	Millennium Project	Mo Funk		
1998	American Prophecy	Diversions	Independent	West Coast Music Award Nominated	

== Jon Bentley Videography as a Digital Artist ==
- “Highway Of Tears - Waxwing & Christi Belcourt” (2021) In collaboration with Michif (Métis) visual artist Christi Belcourt.
- “On This Day - Waxwing” (2021)
- “The Pandemia Hatch - Jon Bentley” (2020)
