= Juno Award for Jazz Album of the Year – Solo =

Canadian music award

The Juno Award for "Jazz Album of the Year - Solo" has been awarded since 2015, as recognition each year for the best jazz album of a solo artist in Canada.

== Winners ==
Year	Winner(s)	Album	Nominees	Ref.
2015	Kirk MacDonald	Vista Obscura	Jim Head, Zoetrope; Lenny Breau, LA Bootleg 1984; Marianne Trudel, La vie commence ici; Owen Howard, Drum Lore Vol. 2 – More Lore	
2016	Robi Botos	Movin' Forward	Al Muirhead, It's About Time; Curtis Nowosad, Dialectics; Rich Brown, Abend; Tara Davidson, Duets	
2017	Renee Rosnes	Written in the Rocks	Shirantha Beddage, Momentum; Seamus Blake, Superconductor; Brandi Disterheft, Blue Canvas; Mike Janzen, Nudging Forever	
2018	Mike Downes	Root Structure	Brad Cheeseman, The Tide Turns; Chet Doxas, Rich in Symbols; Hilario Durán, Contumbao; Ralph Bowen, Ralph Bowen	
2019	Robi Botos	Old Soul	Alexis Baro, Sandstorm; Larnell Lewis, In the Moment; Renee Rosnes, Beloved of the Sky; Alison Young, So Here We Are	
2020	Jacques Kuba Séguin	Migrations	The Mark Kelso Jazz Project, The Chronicles of Fezziwig; Joel Miller, Unstoppable; Ted Quinlan, Absolutely Dreaming; John Stetch, Black Sea Suite	
2021	Jocelyn Gould	Elegant Traveler	Elmer Ferrer, Básico, No Básico y Dirigido; Junior Santos, Conpambiche; Rachel Therrien, Vena; Andrés Vial, Gang of Three	
2022	Will Bonness	Change of Plans	Efajemue, Aesthetics; Jon Gordon, Stranger Than Fiction; Jesse Ryan, Bridges; Andrés Vial, When Is Ancient?	
2023	Renee Rosnes	Kinds of Love	Ernesto Cervini, Joy; Luis Deniz, El Tinajon; Lauren Falls, A Little Louder Now; Rafael Zaldivar, Rumba	
2024	Christine Jensen	Day Moon	Gentiane MG, Walls Made of Glass; Jocelyn Gould, Sonic Bouquet; Noam Lemish, Twelve; Russ Macklem, The South Detroit Connection	
2025	André Leroux	Montreal Jazz Series 1 (Échanges Synaptiques)	Jocelyn Gould, Portrait of Right Now; Mark Kelso, The Antrim Coast; Larnell Lewis, Slice of Life; Audrey Ochoa, The Head of a Mouse	
2026	Renee Rosnes	Crossing Paths	Anthony D'Alessandro, City Lights; Justin Gray, Immersed; Aretha Tillotson, Kinda Out West; Nancy Walker, Deeper Down	
