= Bill Coon =

Canadian composer and guitarist

- Born: July 10, 1959 (age 67); Etobicoke, Ontario
- Genre: Jazz
- Occupations: Musician, composer, educator
- Instrument: Guitar
- Label: Cellar Live
- Website: www.billcoon.com

Bill Coon is a Canadian jazz musician and composer. He is a Juno nominated artist and the winner of the 2009 National Jazz Awards, ‘Guitarist of the Year’. He is known for performing artists such as Miles Black and Jodi Proznick (as Triology), Lonnie Smith, Brad Turner, Peter Bernstein, Bucky Pizzarelli, Ian McDougall, P. J. Perry, Sheila Jordan, Phil Dwyer, Peter Washington, and Oliver Gannon. His compositions and arrangements have been commissioned by large ensembles such as the CBC Radio Orchestra, John Korsrud's Hard Rubber Orchestra, and the Dal Richards Orchestra. He graduated from Concordia University with a Bachelors of Fine Arts in Jazz Studies in 1988, and a Masters of Education from Simon Fraser University in 2012.

A recipient of multiple Canada Council for the Arts awards, he has studied with Jim Hall, Neil Chotem, and Louis Stewart.

He was a faculty member at Capilano University, before he retired in 2025 and currently teaches at the Vancouver Symphony Orchestra School of Music.

Coon is married to band leader and former trombonist Jill Townsend.

== Discography ==
- "Speakeasy" (2003) - Bill Coon Trio
- "Two Much Guitar" (2006) - Bill Coon / Oliver Gannon
- "With Benefits" (2013) - Cory Weeds / Bill Coon Quartet
- "Triology" (2014) - Triology (with Jodi Proznick and Miles Black)
- "Two Much More!" (2015) - Oliver Gannon / Bill Coon
- "Legacy, The Music Of Ross Taggart" (2015) - Jill Townsend Big Band
- "StringSongs" (2022) - Laura Crema / Bill Coon
- "Standard Elegance" (2025)
