= Hard Rubber Orchestra =

Canadian jazz band

The Hard Rubber Orchestra is a jazz band led by composer and trumpeter John Korsrud in Vancouver, British Columbia, Canada. Founded in 1990, it has a shifting membership of 15-30 musicians. It is known for spotlighting work by contemporary composers and won the Alcan Performing Arts Award in 2004.

== History ==
The Hard Rubber Orchestra was founded in 1990 by John Korsrud. It had instrumentation similar to a big band, but the music was "an unholy mashup of minimalism, free jazz, noise, and funk".

In 1992, a non-profit "Hard Rubber Music Society" was created as a vehicle for funding the orchestra. It operates with a mix of private donations, city funding, and Canada Council grants.

== Notable commissions ==
The Hard Rubber Orchestra is characteristically open to new music. It has commissioned over 40 works from 30 contemporary jazz and classical composers. Here are some highlights.

- John Korsrud, Giorgio Magnanensi, and Brad Turner contributed original compositions to the February 2005 multidisciplinary theatre piece, Enter/Exit.
- Ice Age 2010, where the Hard Rubber Orchestra played pieces by Peter Hannan, Brad Turner, Tony Wilson, and Bill Runge, while dancers and ice skaters performed on a hockey rink, was part of the Cultural Olympiad festival which accompanied the 2010 Winter Olympics in Vancouver.
- Linda Bouchard, and Scott Good (Vancouver Symphony Orchestra composer-in-residence), contributed compositions to the Hard Rubber Orchestra's 20th-anniversary concert on May 14, 2011.
- Kenny Wheeler composed a 30-minute piece, which the orchestra premiered in Vancouver on October 19, 2013. The orchestra was joined by trumpeter Mike Herriott, singer Christine Duncan, and trombonist Hugh Fraser as conductor.
- Darcy James Argue composed Tensile Curves, a 30-minute work funded by the Canada Council, which was premiered in Vancouver by the orchestra on 20 June 2014, in a joint concert with Argue's Secret Society.
- Darcy James Argue later composed Ebonite, which the orchestra premiered in Vancouver on May 25, 2019.
- At the same May 25, 2019 concert, the orchestra also premiered Source Code by Haralabos [Harry] Stafylakis.
- Marianne Trudel composed Nature Speaks: 8 Haikus, which the orchestra premiered in Vancouver on October 15, 2019.
- John Hollenbeck composed two pieces, Sighs and Owt Shgis, which the orchestra premiered in Vancouver on May 27, 2023.

== Discography ==
- Hard Rubber Orchestra: Cruel Yet Fair, 1997 Les Disques Victo – VICTO cd059
- Hard Rubber Orchestra: Rub Harder, 2001 Les Disques Victo – VICTO cd 080
- John Korsrud's Hard Rubber Orchestra: Crush, 2015, self-released
- Hard Rubber Orchestra: Kenny Wheeler: Suite for Hard Rubber Orchestra, 2018 JTR
- Hard Rubber Orchestra: Iguana 2022; Redshift TK520

== Notable collaborations ==
- The orchestra was the on-camera backing band for the CBC special, Cantata for the King, which aired on 3 March 2005. It was "a post modern musical celebrating the music and genius of the King of Rock and Roll", Elvis Presley. It featured punk artist Joe Keithley, soprano Robin Driedger-Klassen, and actor Kevin McNulty.
- On 9 May 2015, the orchestra featured composer Christine Jensen and her sister, trumpeter Ingrid Jensen, at a concert launching the orchestra's album Crush, and celebrating its 25th anniversary.

== Awards ==
In 2004, the Hard Rubber Orchestra won the C$60,000 Alcan Performing Arts Award. This funded their February 2005 work, Enter/Exit, a multidisciplinary theatre piece featuring compositions by John Korsrud, Giorgio Magnanensi, and Brad Turner. Videographers HoneyBee Visuals, set designer Andreas Kahre, and director Kim Collier also contributed.

Their album Cruel Yet Fair was a Juno Award nominee for Best Contemporary Jazz Album at the Juno Awards of 1999.

Their album Iguana was a Juno Award nominee for Instrumental Album of the Year at the Juno Awards of 2023.
