= Tom Keenlyside =

Canadian musician

Background information
- Born: 1950 (age 75–76); Vancouver, British Columbia, Canada
- Education: University of British Columbia
- Genres: Jazz, Rock, Pop
- Occupations: arranger, composer, and record producer
- Instruments: Saxophone, Flute

Tom Keenlyside (born 1950) is a Canadian saxophonist, flautist, arranger, composer, and record producer from Vancouver, British Columbia. His work has encompassed jazz, rock, pop, television, and commercial recording.He has performed and recorded with artists including Aerosmith, Bon Jovi, Mötley Crüe, David Lee Roth, Van Halen, Natalie Cole, Dizzy Gillespie, Mel Tormé, Tom Jones, Diana Krall, Harry Connick Jr., Barenaked Ladies, David Foster, Gladys Knight, Tina Turner, Dionne Warwick, and The Temptations.

== Biography ==
Keenlyside was born and raised in Vancouver. He began playing trumpet at the age of 12 and later took up flute. He studied music at the University of British Columbia, graduating with a Bachelor of Arts degree with a major in flute. During the 1960s and 1970s he performed in rhythm and blues and rock groups, including Sunshyne, and expanded his instrumental work to saxophone and other woodwind instruments.

== Career ==
Keenlyside established himself as a freelance musician in Vancouver, working primarily in jazz and popular music. During the 1970s, he toured the United States with the Canadian rock band Prism and subsequently spent a year touring with Bachman–Turner Overdrive (BTO). During these tours, he shared concert bills with artists and groups including Blue Öyster Cult, Foghat, Styx, Alice Cooper, Alvin Lee and others, rather than performing as a member of those acts.

During the same period, Keenlyside worked extensively as a musician with established solo performers and ensembles. His credits included performances with the Don Costa Orchestra and appearances and recordings associated with Tom Jones, Paul Anka, Dizzy Gillespie, Natalie Cole, Dionne Warwick and Mel Tormé. He also appeared on a season of a television program associated with Tom Jones.

In the early 1980s, Keenlyside co-founded the jazz-fusion group Skywalk. The group recorded several albums and toured in the United States. During this period, he also led the Tom Keenlyside Quintet and continued working as a studio musician, arranger and performer.

=== Rock and pop recordings ===
Keenlyside's session work expanded during the 1980s and 1990s. He recorded and arranged horn and woodwind parts on a number of major rock albums, including Bon Jovi's Slippery When Wet, Aerosmith's Permanent Vacation, Pump, Get a Grip and Big Ones, Mötley Crüe's Dr. Feelgood, David Lee Roth's A Little Ain't Enough, and Yes's The Ladder. He also contributed to Barenaked Ladies' Maybe You Should Drive. His work with Aerosmith included tenor saxophone and other horn-section contributions.

=== Film, television and commercial music ===
Beginning in the 1990s, Keenlyside worked extensively as a composer, arranger and producer for television and other commercial projects. Over more than two decades, he collaborated with John Mitchell on music for animated and children's television productions, including MegaMan, MegaMan NT Warrior, Monster Rancher, Dragon Ball Z, Troll Tales and Bibi Blocksberg. He has continued to record, arrange and produce music beyond the period covered by some earlier accounts of his career.

Keenlyside produced That River for blues musician Jim Byrnes. The album received the Juno Award for Blues Album of the Year in 1995.

He has subsequently worked on recording projects in jazz and other genres, including collaborations with producer Bob Rock and musicians Gord Downie and Richie Sambora. His production work has also included albums released through his own label, Artist Jazz Recordings.

Keenlyside has maintained a parallel career in jazz as a performer, composer, arranger and bandleader. He has worked with pianist Miles Black in several projects, including the groups Skywalk and Altered Laws. Altered Laws released ''The Outsiders'' and ''Metaphora'', the latter receiving a Juno Award nomination.

As a leader and producer, Keenlyside has released recordings including Synergy (2006), Musica Brasileira (2015), Pensativa (2018), Fortune Teller (2019), A Night at the Espresso (2021), and Third Street Wobble (2024). ''Synergy'' was recorded with pianist Miles Black, while ''Pensativa'' explored arrangements for flute and big band. Third Street Wobble featured Keenlyside on tenor saxophone with trumpeter Brad Turner, organist Chris Gestrin, guitarist Tristan Paxton and drummer Joe Poole.

Keenlyside has also appeared as a featured musician on recordings by other artists, including the Bob Murphy Quartet's Downtown Eastside Picnic, Altered Laws The Outsiders and Metaphora, and the KM Project's Slices.

== Honors ==
Keenlyside was inducted into the B.C. Entertainment Hall of Fame in 2006. He received a Juno Award as producer of Jim Byrnes's ''That River'' in 1995.

== Discography ==
- Synergy (2006)
- Musica Brasileira (2015)
- Pensativa: Music for Flute Big Band and Jazz Duo (2018)
- Fortune Teller (2019)
- A Night at the Espresso (2021)
- Third Street Wobble (2024)
- Slippery When Wet — Bon Jovi (1986)
- Permanent Vacation — Aerosmith (1987)
- Dr. Feelgood — Mötley Crüe (1989)
- A Little Ain't Enough — David Lee Roth (1991)
- Pump — Aerosmith (1989)
- Get a Grip — Aerosmith (1993)
- Big Ones — Aerosmith (1994)
- Maybe You Should Drive — Barenaked Ladies (1994)
- The Ladder — Yes (1999)
