= Riverdale High School (Quebec) =

Former High school in Pierrefonds, Quebec, Canada

Location
- 5060 Sources Blvd. Pierrefonds, Quebec, H8Y 3E4; Canada; 45.5102°N 73.8249°W

Information
- School type: High school
- Founded: 1964; 62 years ago
- Closed: 2019; 7 years ago
- School board: formerly Lester B. Pearson School Board, and in the now defunct Protestant School Board of Greater Montreal)
- Principal: Mathieu Canavan (2018–2019)
- Grades: Secondary I-V
- Enrollment: 441 (2018-2019)
- Language: English
- Colours: Green and Black
- Mascot: Spartan
- Team name: Spartans
- Website: riverdale.lbpsb.qc.ca

Riverdale High School (often abbreviated as RHS) was an English language secondary school, in the Pierrefonds-Roxboro borough of Montreal, Quebec, Canada. The school was part of the Lester B. Pearson School Board and was designated a "community school".

== History ==
Riverdale had many athletic teams, including basketball, rugby, soccer, volleyball, track and field, and swim teams. The school also had a wide variety of community-based clubs and organizations.

In 1971, the Riverdale Band won the International Band competition held in Moose Jaw, Saskatchewan.

In 1972, an expansion of the original building took place.

The logo visible to the right and the slogan "Reach Higher and Succeed" were adopted during the 1988–1989 school year after they were chosen in a schoolwide contest. Both were submitted by students at the time. The school's official colours were blue (a dark navy blue) and Grey, with the school paper having the matching name "Blue & Grey," but they were changed to match the uniforms adopted in 1993, whose colours were also selected by the student body. Before that the school had no uniform but only a dress code with rules such as "no jeans" and "no clothes with holes."

A dwindling student populace made Riverdale apportion out half of its first floor to a French-language elementary school in 1988 to share costs, leaving the other two floors to the high school, along with the other half of the first floor, which included the cafeteria, shop classes, and music department. Later in 2007, the school got the full first floor back.

In 2011, the main hallway, which was used for the junior grades was closed off for adult education because of its low student population, but the cafeteria was still very much part of the school, as were the drama department, music department and shop classes, situated on the first floor.

In 2017, the second-floor hallway, which had previously run a full rectangular loop, was closed off roughly a fourth of the way through to make more space to be used for adult education which shared the building.

In 2019, the school was forced to close and merge with the nearby Pierrefonds Comprehensive High School by the Minister of Education at the time, Jean-François Roberge. The building transferred over to the French-speaking Marguerite-Bourgeoys school board which had been struggling with overcrowding issues.

The building now houses the de l'Altitude high school.

== Notable alumni ==
- Ian Beausoleil-Morrison, nee Morrison; professional engineer and academic, Head of the Sustainable Building and Energy Systems group, Faculty of Engineering and Design at Carleton University
- Michael Calce, denial-of-service attack hacker known as Mafiaboy
- Khem Birch, Professional basketball player for the Toronto Raptors (NBA)
- David Boys, World (1997) and Canadian (2003) Scrabble champion
- Craig Button (1980), former NHL executive, current hockey broadcast analyst
- Bill Coon (1976), jazz guitarist, composer
- Glen MacPherson (1975), cinematographer
- Harley Morenstein, Host and creator of YouTube show Epic Meal Time and host of Epic Chef
- Eric Prosh (1975), Director of Minerals and Petroleum Resources, Nunavut
- Harry Standjofski (1976), actor, theater director, playwright.
- Jack W. Szostak (1968), cell biologist, recipient of Nobel Prize in Physiology or Medicine in 2009
- André White (1976), musician, composer, recording engineer, and educator
- Alissa White-Gluz, former lead singer of Canadian Metalcore Band The Agonist and current lead singer of Swedish Melodic Death Metal Band Arch Enemy
- Charlene Wong, Olympic figure skater
