= Justin Gray (musician) =

Canadian musician

Justin Gray is a Canadian musician based in Toronto, Ontario. He is most noted for his 2025 album Immersed, which won the award for Best Immersive Audio Album at the 68th Annual Grammy Awards, and is a Juno Award nominee for Jazz Album of the Year, Solo at the Juno Awards of 2026.

He is a professor of music production at Humber College. He is also a member of the jazz ensemble Avataar, who won the Juno Award for Jazz Album of the Year, Group at the Juno Awards of 2022.

== Awards ==
Award	Year	Category	Nominated work	Result	Ref
Canadian Folk Music Awards	2018	Best Instrumental Solo Artist	New Horizons	Nominated	
Grammy Awards	2026	Best Immersive Audio Album	Immersed	Won	
Juno Awards	2026	Jazz Album of the Year, Solo	Immersed	Nominated	
