= John Barlow Jarvis =

American songwriter (born 1954)

John Barlow Jarvis (born January 2, 1954, in Pasadena, California) is an American songwriter, composer, session pianist and recording artist. He had lived in Nashville, Tennessee from 1982 until his move to Lake Tahoe in 2014. However, he currently resides in Nashville again.

== Early career (1968–1982) ==
As a child, Jarvis was trained in classical music under Evelyn Hood in San Marino, California, and won both the Southern California Bach Festival and first place in the California Music Teachers Composition Contest. He first began his professional musical career at the age of 14 when he was signed as a staff songwriter for Edwin H. Morris Music. By age 17, he was a staff piano player for Motown Records. He also toured with such 1960s bands as the Grass Roots and Hermans Hermits before landing the job of pianist in Rod Stewart's band in 1974. During this period he played on records by artists such as Ringo Starr, Harry Nilsson, Delbert McClinton, Air Supply, John Cougar Mellencamp, Leo Sayer, Art Garfunkel, Stephen Bishop and many more.

== Studio work, composing and recording artist (1982–present) ==
Jarvis relocated from Los Angeles to Nashville in 1982 and continued with his studio career culminating in several nominations for both CMA and ACM musician of the year. The list of artists Jarvis has recorded with includes Garth Brooks, Tammy Wynette, Shania Twain, Dusty Springfield, Bob Seger, Hank Williams Jr, George Strait, Reba McEntire, Jimmy Buffett, Lionel Richie, Steve Earle, Mary Chapin Carpenter, and more. He also played piano on the Elvis Presley Christmas Duets Album and performed with James Taylor for his Small World Tour. In 2011 Jarvis performed at the White House with James Taylor for the PBS special "In Performance at the White House". Jarvis has also performed on TV with Ray Charles and Sting.

While continuing his career as a recording pianist Jarvis also composed numerous songs resulting in country hits for Conway Twitty, Waylon Jennings, Steve Wariner and Kenny Rogers and Dolly Parton, culminating in being awarded 2 Grammys for Song of the Year (1991-1992) for co-writing Vince Gill's biggest hit "I Still Believe In You" and The Judds' #1 hit "Love Can Build A Bridge". His songwriting success has continued beyond country music with songs recorded by Stevie Nicks, Taj Mahal, Bad Company, Cher, Westlife and many more. In 1996 his song "The Flame" was the closing song at the Atlanta Olympics. Jarvis was also nominated for an Emmy for his score in the TV show "Expedition Earth". In 2015 Jarvis wrote music for the best selling video game "Fallout 4". He has also contributed 26 tracks to Band-in-a-Box, the automatic accompaniment software program.

Beginning in 1984, Jarvis recorded four albums for MCA Records. In 1993, he recorded his fifth album ("Balancing Act") for Liberty Records, and, in 2003, recorded his sixth album ("View From a Southern Porch") for Barlotone Productions. Time Magazine named "Whatever Works" as one of the ten best pop records of 1988. and music from "So Far So Good" was picked as theme music for the 1988 Winter Olympics in Calgary.

As of 2016, Jarvis continues to tour with the Vince Gill band, which also features Jimmie Lee Sloas, Paul Franklin and Tom Bukovac. Jarvis continues to record, performing on works by Lynda Carter, Chris Botti and others.

== Discography ==
=== Solo recordings ===
- So Far So Good (MCA Master Series, 1985)
- Something Constructive (MCA Master Series, 1986)
- Whatever Works (MCA Master Series, 1988)
- Pure Contours (MCA Master Series, 1990)
- Balancing Act (Liberty Records, 1993)
- View From a Southern Porch (Barlotone Productions, 2003
