= André White =

Canadian musician (born 1959)

André Keith White (born May 20, 1959) is a Canadian musician, composer, recording engineer and educator. He is an associate professor in jazz studies at the Schulich School of Music in Montreal.

== Early life ==
André White grew up in Roxboro, Quebec. He is the only child of Keith White, a schoolteacher and jazz pianist and Jeannine Cossette, a sales clerk and homemaker. He attended Riverdale High School, Vanier College, Concordia University, where he earned a BA in English Literature, and McGill University, where he earned a master's degree in Sound Recording (Tonmeister).

== Music career ==
White plays both piano and drums. He began playing drums at age 12. In high school, he formed a band with his classmates including guitarist Bill Coon. Some of the notable jazz performers he has accompanied in the past 35 years include Benny Carter, Dizzy Gillespie, Pepper Adams, Jimmy Heath, Benny Golson, Steve Grossman, David Liebman, George Garzone, Junior Cook, Bob Berg, Bobby Watson, Cecil Payne, Sonny Greenwich, Pat LaBarbera, Sheila Jordan, Don Thompson, Kirk MacDonald, PJ Perry and Al McLean. André's trio, with Alec Walkington on bass, and Dave Laing on drums, has been playing together for over twenty-five years, and has served as rhythm section to many of Montreal's important bands, including quintets led by Kevin Dean and Reno De Stephano, and the big band of Joe Sullivan.

== Partial discography ==
| Year | Album | Notes | Label |
|---|---|---|---|
| 2001 | Signal | | Cornerstone |
| 2007 | Luck | | Chance |
| 2011 | Code White | | Chance |
| 2016 | El Toro | | Chance |
| 2016 | Give The Drummer Some! | | Chance |
| 2016 | Esprit De Corps | | Chance |
