= Jocelyn Gould =

Canadian jazz guitarist

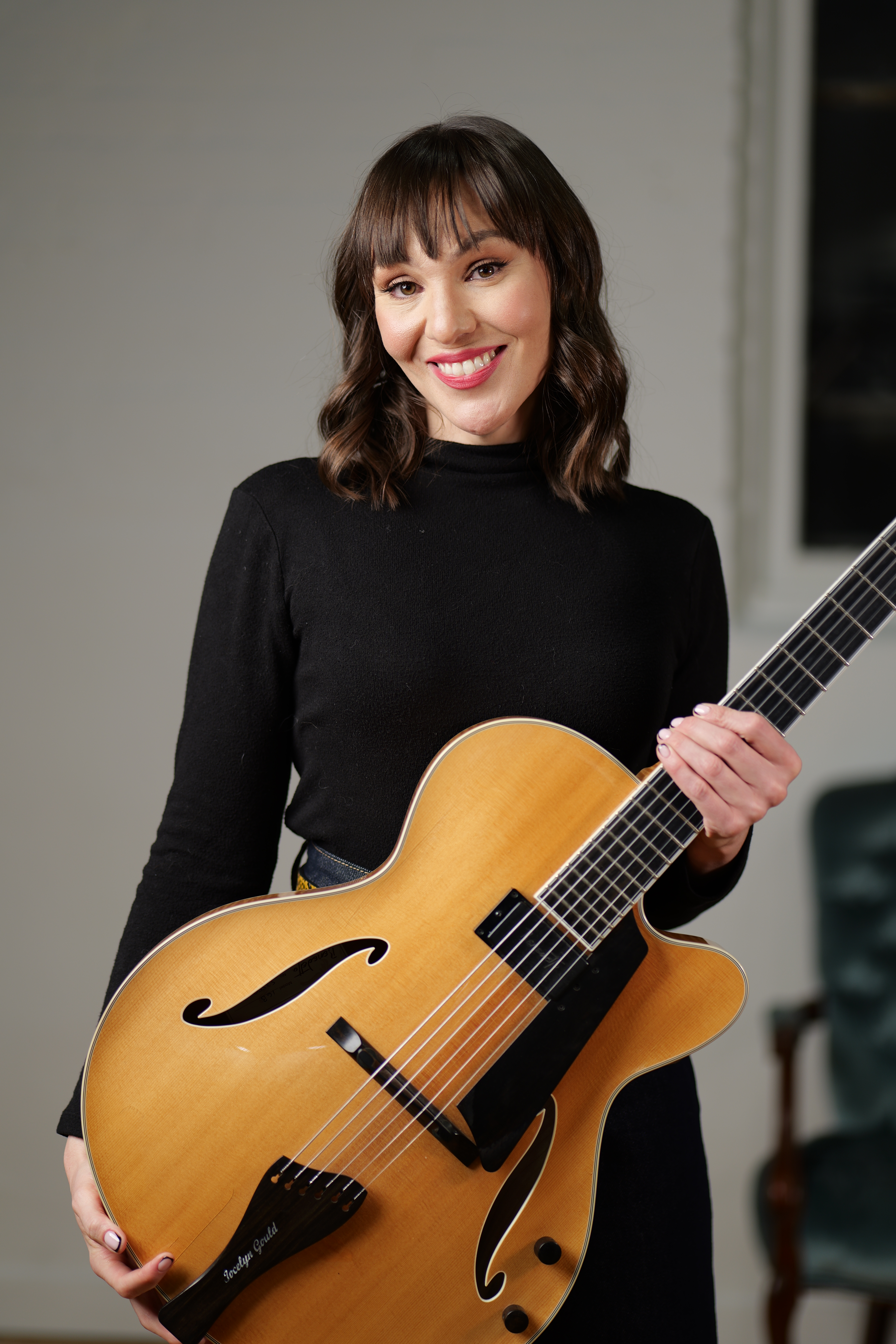
- Jocelyn Gould

Background information
- Born: Winnipeg, Manitoba, Canada
- Genres: Jazz
- Occupation: Musician
- Instruments: Guitar
- Years active: 2020–present
- Website: Official site

Jocelyn Gould is a Canadian jazz guitarist. Her album Elegant Traveler was awarded the 2021 Juno Award for Jazz Album of the Year - Solo. She is also the 1st place winner of the 2018 Wilson Centre International Jazz Guitar competition.

She is a graduate of the University of Manitoba, and later received her Master's of Music at Michigan State University where she studied with Randy Napoleon. Gould has performed alongside many notable musicians including Freddy Cole, Jodi Proznick, Laila Biali, Allison Au, and Will Bonness.

Gould was a faculty member and Head of the Guitar Department at Humber Polytechnic in Toronto. Her debut album Elegant Traveler was released in 2020, and her second album Golden Hour was released in 2022.

== Discography ==
=== As leader ===
- Elegant Traveler (Posi-Tone, 2020)
- Golden Hour (Jocelyn Gould Music, 2022)
- Sonic Bouquet (Jocelyn Gould Music, 2023)
- Portrait of Right Now (Jocelyn Gould Music, 2024)
- So Delighted (Jocelyn Gould Music, 2026)

=== As side person ===
- Change of Plans - 2020, Will Bonness
- Never More Here - 2020, Michael Dease
- Stranger Than Fiction - 2021, Jon Gordon
- No Bounds - 2021, Caity Gyorgy
- The Ostara Project - 2022, with Jodi Proznick and Amanda Tosoff

=== Singles ===
- "It's A Human Race" - 2022, Fraser MacPherson
- "I Miss Missing You" - 2022, Caity Gyorgy
