= Florian Hoefner Trio =

The Florian Hoefner Trio are a Canadian jazz trio from St. John's, Newfoundland and Labrador. Their album Desert Bloom was the winner of the Juno Award for Jazz Album of the Year, Group at the Juno Awards of 2023.

The band is led by pianist Florian Hoefner, a music professor at the Memorial University of Newfoundland, with bassist Andrew Downing and drummer Nick Fraser. They were previously nominated in the same Juno category for First Spring at the Juno Awards of 2021.

Hoefner has previously recorded albums as a solo artist, and with the Florian Hoefner Group.

== Discography ==
- First Spring - 2019
- Desert Bloom - 2022
