= Miles Black =

Canadian jazz pianist

- Born: April 13, 1966 (age 58); Port Alberni, British Columbia, Canada
- Origin: Victoria, British Columbia, Canada
- Genres: Jazz, R&B
- Occupation(s): Musician, producer
- Instrument(s): Piano, guitar, saxophone, double bass
- Years active: 1980–present
- Labels: Cellar Live
- Website: milesblack.ca

Miles Black (born April 13, 1966) is a Canadian jazz pianist.

== Early life ==
With a guitarist for a father, Black heard plenty of music around the house. Musicians came by, jam sessions broke out, and Black grew up wanting to play an instrument with his father. When he was eleven years old, he studied classical music on piano. Three years later he was performing in public. By the age of 18, he had worked as a bassist, guitarist, saxophonist, vocalist, film composer, music therapist, and music director of the C.A.S.T. Theatre Company

== Career ==
In 1987, Black moved to Vancouver. He taught piano at Capilano College in Vancouver from 1990 to 1996 and toured Canada in 1996 with his quartet. He played piano and keyboards for musical theatre and recording sessions for television and film. He has written over 350 songs with vocalist Glenda Rae and has produced music instructional software. He has been a member of Skywalk and Altered Laws with saxophonist Tom Keenlyside.

Black has also worked with Carl Allen, Gaye Delorme, Harry "Sweets" Edison, Jim Ferguson, Maynard Ferguson, Rob Frayne, Johnny Frigo, Oliver Gannon, Slide Hampton, Paul Horn, Jeff Hyslop, Chuck Israels, Ernie Krivda, Fraser MacPherson, Sam Masich, Ann Mortifee, Mark Murphy, Houston Person, Max Roach, Claudio Roditi, Lew Tabackin, Brad Turner, Shari Ulrich, Valdy, Von Freeman, and Rodney Whitaker.

== Discography ==
=== As leader or co-leader ===
- Purple Phase (1991)
- Larger Than Life with Skywalk (1992)
- Spin Cycle (1995)
- Silent Night: Traditional Carols (Ancient Echoes Music, 2002)
- Rooms Within (Morton Davis Productions, 2005)
- Two (Carltunes, 2006)
- Synergy with Tom Keenlyside (Artist Jazz, 2006)
- Outsiders with Altered Laws (2007)
- Metaphora with Altered Laws (2007)
- Some Enchanted Evening (Cellar Live, 2008)
- Storybook with Jennifer Scott (2009)
- Escorial with Rene Worst (MBRW, 2010)
- Live at the Cellar with Grant Stewart (2013)
- Broadway with Oliver Gannon (Cellar Live)
