= Pierrefonds Community High School =

Location
- 13800 Pierrefonds Boulevard; Pierrefonds, Quebec, H9A 1A7; Canada; 45°29′36″N 73°50′51″W

Information
- School type: Public Middle and High School
- Motto: To Strive To Seek To Find
- Founded: 1971
- School board: Lester B. Pearson School Board
- Principal: Daniel Maag
- Grades: Secondary 1 to 5
- Enrollment: 1000
- Language: English
- Colours: Black and Gold
- Mascot: Trojan Horse
- Team name: Trojans
- Website: pchs.lbpsb.qc.ca

Pierrefonds Community High School (often abbreviated as PCHS), is a non-denominational, English speaking educational facility located in the Pierrefonds-Roxboro borough of Montreal, Quebec, Canada with an enrollment capacity of approximately 1,200 students, in grades 7 through 11. It operates within the Lester B. Pearson School Board and has functioned as a secondary school since 1971. Having been originally named Pierrefonds Comprehensive High School, the slight name variation was added after the merge with Riverdale High School in 2019. The principal of the school is Daniel Maag who took over as principal since May 8, 2025.

== History ==
PCHS began as an academic and vocational high school for both English and French speaking Catholic students to accommodate West Island population expansion at the beginning of the 1970s. Prior to its opening in 1971, established West Island schools such as Saint Thomas High School, located in Pointe-Claire, Quebec, were doubling their enrolments to accommodate Catholic students. English non-Catholic students were already served by Riverdale High School, which opened in 1964.

Originally conceived under the proposed name of Villa Nova, the long-awaited school would be called Ecole Polyvalente Pierrefonds Comprehensive High School as a compromise from among the French and English speaking parents. In 1979 it ceded half its population when French speaking students moved to the new Polyvalente des Sources high school, located nearby. PCHS remained a Catholic school until 1998, when Quebec's Catholic and Protestant school boards were replaced with a secular, linguistically based system.

In 1994 it began its International Baccalaureate program which continues to this day, and in 1995 undertook a campaign to amend its name, although a strategic focus group decided to keep the name "comprehensive" to reflect both the wide variety of programs and services offered and the commitment to meeting all student needs. In 2001 it celebrated its 30th anniversary and honored four teachers for their long standing and exceptional educational service and dedication to the school.

In 2019, it was announced by Quebec Education Minister Jean-François Roberge that Riverdale High School would be merging with PCHS in an attempt to deal with overcrowding issues of the Commission scolaire Marguerite-Bourgeoys. Following the merger with Riverdale, the school board renamed the school to Pierrefonds Community High School.

== Architecture ==
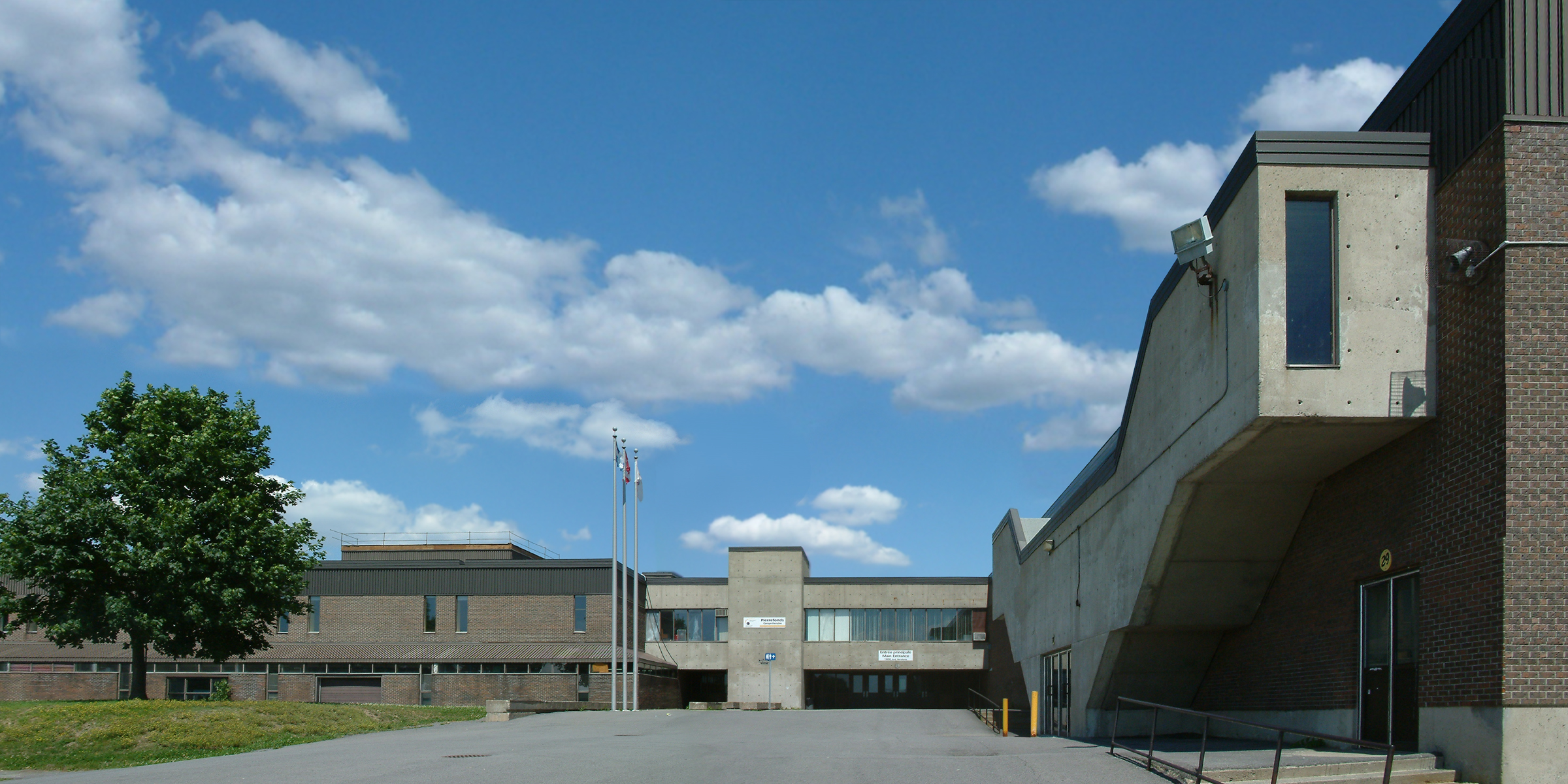
Main entrance, looking east, photographed in June 2006

PCHS was built as a single structure with two separate, open-concept academic wings, each reflecting the other along an axial center comprising a cafeteria and administrative offices in the middle, a "massive" gymnasium, or "field house", at the south end, and technical classrooms at the north. Plans for the new school were first shown to the Ministry of Education in 1965, with Montreal architects Affleck, Desbarats, Dimakopoulos, Lebensold, Sise—who designed Place des Arts, Place Bonaventure and the National Gallery of Canada, overseeing the design. Villa Nova principal John Oss, who would become PCHS's first principal, made the recommendation. Sod turning occurred on February 11, 1970, with Janin Construction, general contractors on the project, having to complete it by September 1971 in time for the fall semester.

The design employed industrial visual cues like unfinished concrete walls, exposed ceiling pipes and ducts that were painted primary red, blue and yellow enamel, and a limited amount of windows that did not open due to the school being fully air-conditioned. Walls between adjoining classrooms could be moved to allow for team teaching of up to 4 classes at a time. This was only used in the early years for English literature classes. Stylistically it was considered ultra-modern for an educational institution at the time, particularly due to the fact that the classrooms had no doors, an experiment that resulted in students sometimes being distracted by people passing by in the halls. The school was still being finished when classes began in the fall of 1971.

== PCHS ==
Digital plan of the building and property

Besides its international baccalaureate program, PCHS participates in an aggressive immersion program, an English program and a handicapped program. In sports it is a member of the Greater Montreal Athletic Association and is represented by the "Trojans'" who are the male athletes and the "Lady Trojans" who are the female athletes. It has a wide variety of sports for different kinds of interest such as touch football, soccer (indoor/outdoor), track and field (indoor/outdoor), rugby, softball, volleyball, swimming, badminton, tennis etc. Coach Hank Palmer is a Canadien Olympian.

Throughout the years students must choose between three art options: visual arts, drama and music. In grades 7 and 8 students also have the choice of dance as one of their art options. Starting in grade 9 students are allowed to change their art option if the one they chose in grade 7 does not see them fit. In grades 10 and 11 students must choose between CST and SN mathematics courses. It is important for students to choose the proper one since SN mathematics is a prerequisite for certain CEGEP programs. In grade 10 students may choose two classes out of a variety of different classes to go into in grade 11. These classes may differ from year to year, but generally include biology, chemistry, cooking, leadership, physics, and psychology.

== Notable alumni ==
- Greg Hemphill, Scottish-Canadian comedian, actor, writer, and director
- Jonathan Drouin, Canadian professional ice hockey player
- Anthony Duclair, Canadian professional ice hockey player
- Thomas Dowd, Canadian Bishop
