= Efajemue =

Canadian jazz musician (born 1988)

Efajemue Etoroma Jr.
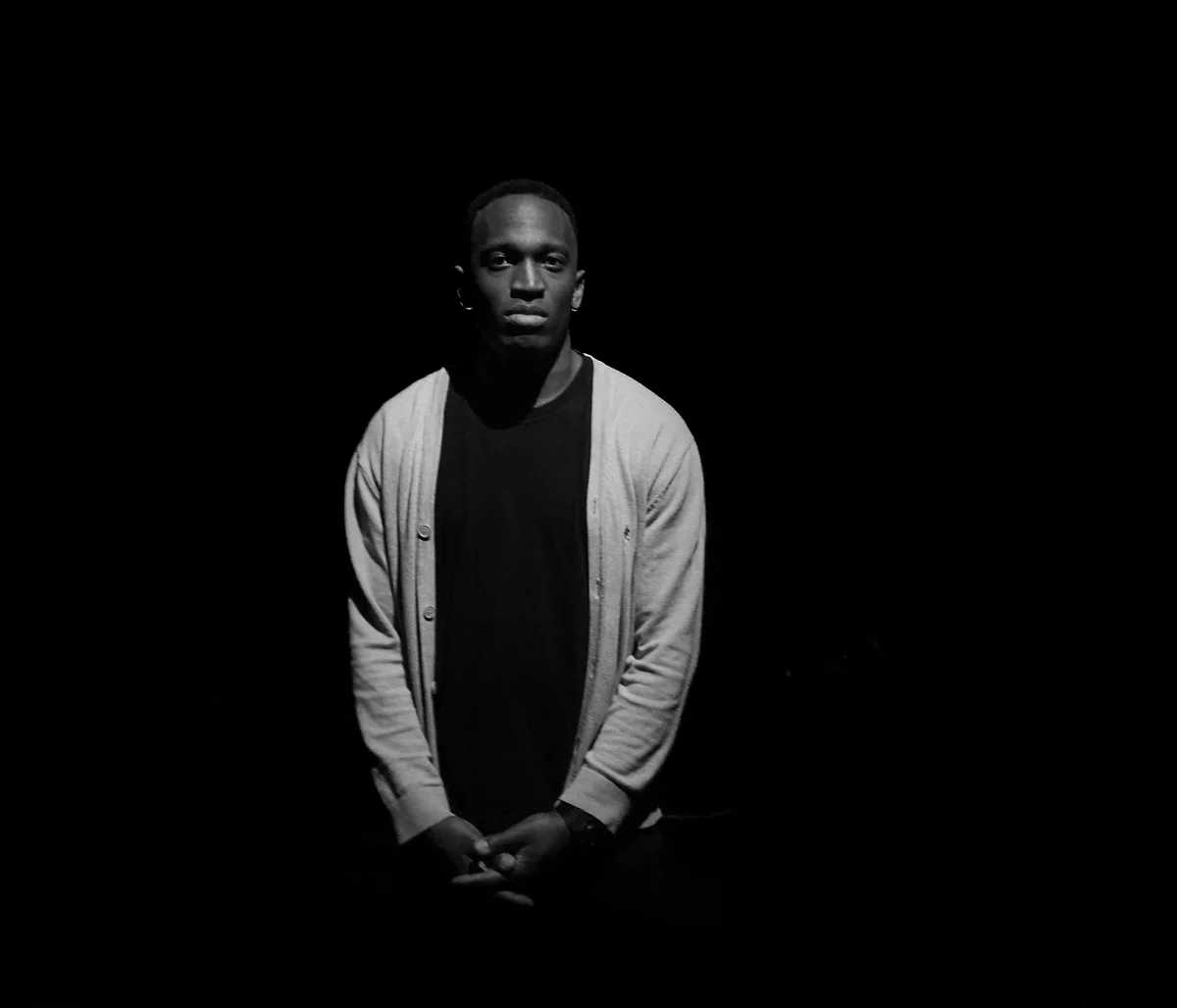

Background information
- Also known as: Efa
- Born: Efajemue Enenajor Etoroma Jr. August 3, 1988 (age 38); Hamilton, Ontario, Canada
- Occupation: Musician
- Instruments: Drums, piano, bass, guitar
- Years active: 2006-present
- Formerly of: Moonchild

Efajemue "Efa" Etoroma Jr. (born August 3, 1988), is a Canadian jazz musician most noted for his 2021 album Aesthetics, which was a Juno Award nominee for Jazz Album of the Year – Solo at the Juno Awards of 2022.

As a drummer, Etoroma has been compared to the likes of Brian Blade, Roy Hanes and Tony Williams, while taking modern influences from drummers and producers such as Chris Dave, ?uestlove and Steve Jordan Efa has served as the drummer for various acts including, Moonchild, Sneakout, Common Souls, Sensae and Zephyr Avalon

He is based in Los Angeles, California, where he has served on faculty at various higher education institutions and has released several albums that blend jazz music with hip hop and rhythm and blues influences.

== Early life and education ==
Born in Hamilton, Ontario, he grew up primarily in Edmonton, Alberta, where his father, Efa Etoroma Sr., is a sociology professor at Concordia University of Edmonton. He started playing drums at a young age, taking lessons locally. He took an interest in jazz music in his youth and continued on to study Jazz Performance at McGill University's Schulich School of Music in Montreal. Graduating with a B.Mus. in 2011, Etoroma then went on to graduate with a Master of Fine Arts (MFA) from California Institute for the Arts in 2015. At Cal Arts Etoroma grew in his playing abilities and expanded knowledge through extensive study of hand percussion, arranging, composition, and electronic music.

== Career ==
=== Early career ===
Efa always had a passion for music growing up. He grew up in a musical household, with his father, who is a guitarist, exposing him to various styles of music over the years. At a young age, he began piano lessons switching to percussion in Junior High school band. Taking to the drums quickly, Etoroma received a number of awards for his musical achievements including "Most Outstanding Drummer at the West Coast International Music Festival, selection as Percussionist in Alberta Honor Band, a scholarship to Humber College, Musicfest Canada Zildjian Combo Drummer Award, selection as the drummer in the Yamaha All-Star band at Musicfest Canada, and a Yamaha showcase performance in the 2011 Montreal Drumfest."

=== 2006–2011: McGill University ===
After graduating from high school, Efa enrolled in the Schulich School of Music at McGill University in Montreal to study Jazz Performance. This is where he began fine-tuning his playing and developing further as a producer and bandleader. Exploring other various musical influences, Etoroma created a number of groups, such as Ruckus, which was a mix of hip-hop, jazz, and funk. He also lead a trio of his namesake, the Efa Etoroma Jr, Trio that released an album entitled Before and After. The group also performed at the Montreal International Jazz Festival in 2011 and was nominated for the TD Grand Jazz Award and the Galaxie Rising Star Award at the Festival that same year.

=== 2012–2015: California Institute of The Arts ===
In 2012 Etoroma moved to California to pursue his master's degree under the tutelage of Joseph LaBarbera, who is most known for performing and recording with Jazz legend Bill Evans as part of his trio.

=== 2015–present ===
Etoroma has made a living as a session drummer, educator and touring drummer for number of acts. Efa has served on faculty at California State University Dominguez Hills, and Musician's Institute, teaching Drum Set, production and Abelton courses. He is also a contributor to SoundFly, creating educational digital content for musicians. Etoroma has also toured and performed on a number of tours in the United States, Europe and Asia with neo-soul trio Moonchild.

On March 1, 2022, Efajemue received his first Juno nomination in the Jazz Album of the Year – Solo category for his 2021 project Aesthetics. This eight-song album was released independently on November 2, 2021.
