= Eric Prosh =

Canadian paleontologist, geologist, and civil servant

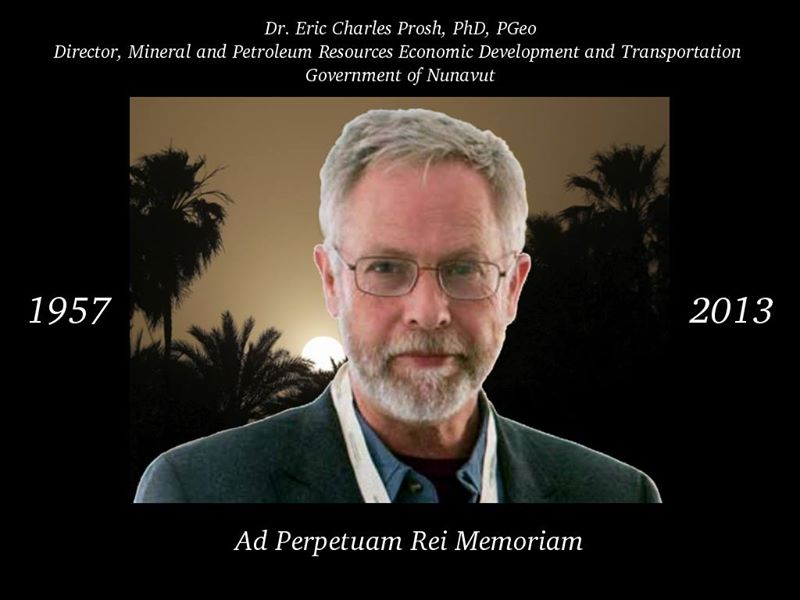
Eric Charles Prosh (1957-2013) - Ad Perpetuam Rei Memoriam.

Eric Charles Prosh (December 17, 1957 – September 3, 2013) was a Canadian paleontologist, geologist, and civil servant who worked in Nunavut.

== Early life ==
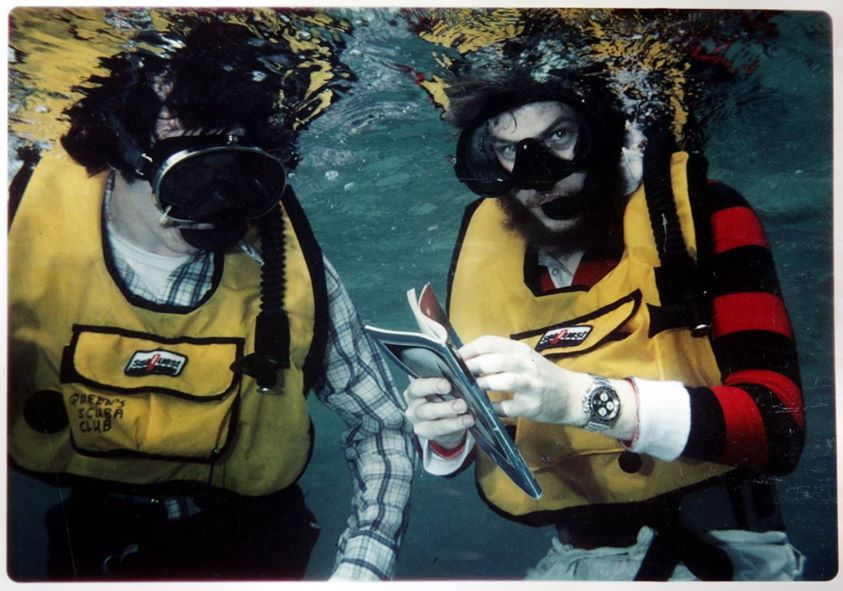
Dr. Eric Charles Prosh studies the diversity of the Caribbean Coral Reef Ecosystems (CCRE) 18 km offshore at the Smithsonian Carrie Bow Cay Field Station on the Meso-American Barrier Reef in Belize [16°48'11.0"N, 88°04'55.2"W : 16.803059,-88.084197] in 1980.

Prosh grew up in Roxboro, Quebec. His parents Eric and Marie had immigrated from Europe to Montreal in the early 1950s. He attended Riverdale High School, where he was valedictorian, Vanier College, and Queen's University. He earned a doctorate in paleontology at the University of Western Ontario in 1989, after years of research on fossils in the Disappointment Bay Formation. He was a post-doctoral student at McGill University prior to employment in industry, eventually at Spectral International, a Colorado-based company specializing in remote sensing and spectroscopy.

== Legacy ==
Prosh joined Nunavut's Department of Economic Development and Transportation in 2006, and became the Director of Minerals and Petroleum Resources. He was a key player on the Nunavut Mining Symposium organizing committees, during a period of strong growth in the regional economy, driven by the mining sector. He died suddenly on September 3, 2013 en route back to Iqaluit after a holiday.

One of the annual Nunavut Mining Awards sponsored by Canadian North Airlines is named after him. The Eric Prosh Government/Organization Award is in recognition of the contribution of a government department or organization to the advancement of the mining industry in Nunavut.
