= Avataar (band) =

Canadian jazz ensemble

- Origin: Toronto, Canada
- Genres: Jazz
- Years active: 2015–present
- Label: InSound Records
- Members: Sundar Viswanathan; Michael Occhipinti; Justin Gray; Ravi Naimpally; Max Senitt; Felicity Williams; Laura Swankey
- Past members: Rich Brown; Giampaolo Scatozza; Robi Botos; Suba Sankaran; George Koller; Todd Pentney; Aaron Lightstone; Tyler Emond

Avataar is a Canadian jazz ensemble from Toronto, Ontario, whose album Worldview won the Juno Award for Jazz Album of the Year – Group at the Juno Awards of 2022. Worldview was also earmarked by CJRT-FM as one of the 25 best jazz albums of 2021.

Led by saxophonist, flutist, composer and vocalist Sundar Viswanathan, the band performs a blend of jazz with world music and rock/pop styles such as Bossa Nova, Indian classical music, African, art rock, ambient music and gamelan. Viswanathan, a native of Sudbury, Ontario, is currently a professor of music at York University in Toronto, and has also played with the world music combo Jaffa Road.

The group's debut album Petal was released in 2016.

Other members of the band are vocalist Felicity Williams, tabla player Ravi Naimpally, guitarist Michael Occhipinti, bassist Justin Gray and drummers Giampaolo Scatozza and Max Senitt.
