= Moonchild (American band) =

American alternative R&B band

- Moonchild at the Grammys, 2023.

Background information
- Origin: Los Angeles, California, United States
- Genres: Alternative R&B, neo-soul, jazz
- Years active: 2011–present
- Labels: Tru Thoughts, ONErpm
- Members: Amber Navran; Max Bryk; Andris Mattson
- Website: thisismoonchild.com

Moonchild is an American alternative R&B band based in Los Angeles, California, consisting of Amber Navran, Andris Mattson, and Max Bryk. The band is known for blending elements of jazz, R&B, and electronic music.

Moonchild formed in the summer of 2011 while on tour with Amber Navran’s solo project. The trio bonded over their shared musical interests and spent the following months writing the material that would become Be Free. All three members are alumni of the USC Thornton School of Music's Jazz Studies program.

Their first full-length album, Be Free, was released in 2012. The album received praise from notable figures such as Jill Scott, DJ Jazzy Jeff, and Stevie Wonder. After listening to their music, Stevie Wonder invited Moonchild to open for him at his annual House Full of Toys benefit concert in December 2012.

Please Rewind, Moonchild’s second album, was released in 2015 on the Tru Thoughts label. Following the release of the lead single, "The Truth", the band supported The Internet (Odd Future's Syd (formerly Syd tha Kyd) and Matt Martians) on their US and Canada tour.

In 2017, Moonchild released Voyager, which charted at No. 13 on Billboard’s Heatseekers Album chart. The album was also included in Bandcamp's Top 100 Albums of 2017, further increasing their presence within the alternative R&B genre.

Their next album, Little Ghost (2019), reached No. 6 on Billboard's Heatseekers Album chart. Moonchild's NPR Tiny Desk performance during this period became a milestone for the band, spotlighting their acoustic, stripped-down sound and their commitment to a social call to action. The album also led to them receiving the Jazz FM Soul Act of the Year award in 2018.

In 2022, Moonchild released their fifth album, Starfruit, reflecting a decade of collaboration and growth. The album received a nomination for Grammy Award for Best Progressive R&B Album in 2023.

In 2025, Moonchild announced WAVES, their sixth album, scheduled for release on February 20, 2026, under a new partnership with the ONErpm label, featuring collaborations with various artists including Jill Scott and Lalah Hathaway.

== Band members ==
- Amber Navran — lead vocals, flute, tenor saxophone, synthesizer, piano, drums (2011–present)
- Max Bryk - piano, synthesizer, alto saxophone, clarinet, kalimba, drums (2011–present)
- Andris Mattson - piano, synthesizer, trumpet, flugelhorn, acoustic guitar, ukulele, drums (2011–present)
- Efajemue - touring drummer

== Discography ==
=== Albums ===
Year	Album	Track list
2012	Be free	1. "Misinterpretations"; 2. "Be Free"; 3. "Back to Me"; 4. "Gone"; 5. "Throwback"; 6. "Ocean Deep"; 7. "Out of My Mind"; 8. "The Things You Do (feat. Russell Ferrante"; 9. "Turn It Up!"; 10. "Mmm (The Heaven)"; 11. "What Shall We Do"
2015	Please Rewind	1. "All the Joy"; 2. "The Truth"; 3. "Don’t Wake Me"; 4. "Nobody"; 5. "More Than Ever"; 6. "Just a Minute"; 7. "Winter Breeze"; 8. "I’ll Make It Easy"; 9. "Please Rewind - Interlude"; 10. "Moonlight"
2017	Voyager	1. "Voyager - Intro"; 2. "Cure"; 3. "6am" 4. "Every Part - For Linda"; 5. "Hideaway"; 6. "The List"; 7. "Doors Closing"; 8. "Run Away"; 9. "Think Back"; 10. "Now and Then"; 11. "Change Your Mind"; 12. "Show the Way"; 13. "Let You Go"
2019	Little Ghost	1. "Wise Women"; 2. "Too Much to Ask"; 3. "The Other Side"; 4. "Sweet Love"; 5. "Strength"; 6. "Everything I Need"; 7. "Money"; 8. "Nova"; 9. "Get To Know It"; 10. "What You’re Doing"; 11. "Come Over"; 12. "Onto Me"; 13. "Whistling"; 14. "Still Wonder"
2022	Starfruit	1. "Tell Him (feat. Lalah Hathaway)"; 2. "Takes Two"; 3. "Little Things"; 4. "You Got One (feat. Alex Isley)"; 5. "Too Good"; 6. "Need That (feat. Ill Camille)"; 7. "I'll Be Here"; 8. "Get By (feat. Tank and The Bangas)"; 9. "What You Wanted"; 10. "Love I Need (feat. Rapsody)"; 11. "By Now"; 12. "Don't Hurry Home (feat. Mumu Fresh)"; 13. "Last Time"; 14. "The Long Way (feat. Chantae Cann & Josh Johnson)"
2026	WAVES	1. "Not Sorry (feat. Jill Scott & Rapsody)"; 2. "Ride the Wave (feat. Astyn Turr)"; 3. "When You Know"; 4. "Up From Here"; 5. "Waves Hotline"; 6. "Fear (Hey Friend)"; 7. "Advice"; 8. "Counting"; 9. "Sweet Spot"; 10. "Strong (feat. Erin Bentlage)"; 11. "For Yourself (feat. Lalah Hathaway & Chris Dave)"; 12. "Sick"; 13. "Nothing to Prove"; 14. "Afterglow"
