= Daniel Hersog =

Canadian jazz trumpeter

- Born: December 29, 1985 (age 40); Victoria, British Columbia, Canada
- Genres: Jazz
- Occupations: Musician, composer, educator
- Instrument: Trumpet
- Label: Cellar Live

Daniel Hersog is a Canadian jazz trumpeter and band leader. He is a member of the faculty at Capilano University and the Vancouver Symphony Orchestra School of Music. Hersog graduated from Capilano University in 2007, and New England Conservatory in 2016.

Hersog's first album Night Devoid of Stars, featuring Noah Preminger and Frank Carlberg was released in 2020. His second album Open Spaces - Folk Songs Reimagined was released in 2023 and features Kurt Rosenwinkel, Dan Weiss, and Scott Robinson.

He has toured North America leading large ensembles featuring such notable musicians as Terry Clarke, Kevin Turcotte, Remy Le Boeuf, Brad Turner, Billy Buss, Stuart Mack, Jason Palmer, Kim Cass, and the Jaelem Bhate Jazz Orchestra.

He is a recipient of the Gunther Schuller Medal, is an inductee to the Pi Kappa Lambda honors society, and has performed multiple times at the Vancouver International Jazz Festival.

== Discography ==
=== As leader ===
- 2020 - Night Devoid of Stars (Cellar Music) - Daniel Hersog Jazz Orchestra
- 2023 - Open Spaces - Folk Songs Reimagined (Cellar Music) - Daniel Hersog Jazz Orchestra

=== As sideperson ===
- 2018 - The Hurt of Happiness - Hey Ocean!
- 2019 - On the Edge - Jaelem Bhate Jazz Orchestra
- 2020 - Carmen Suite - Jaelem Bhate Jazz Orchestra
