= Sam Masich =

Tai chi instructor, Author, Songwriter and Filmmaker

- Masich in front of his studio
- Born: February 7, 1962 (age 63); Prince George, British Columbia, Canada
- Occupation(s): Tai chi instructor, songwriter and filmmaker

Sam Masich (born February 7, 1962) is a tai chi instructor, performing songwriter and filmmaker residing in Vancouver, British Columbia, Canada and Berlin, Germany.

== Biography ==
Masich was born February 7, 1962, in Prince George, British Columbia, Canada. He began his career with an intensive apprenticeship in tai chi and judo at age 18 with Brien Gallagher in Burnaby, BC. By age twenty, he was teaching in community centres in Vancouver BC and in 1985 was selected to Canada's national wushu team to compete in the 1st International Invitational Wushu Tournament in Xi'an, China. During the 1980s, Masich gained a reputation as a top tai chi/neijia competitor. He currently resides in Berlin, Germany.

During the 1980s and 1990s, Masich became a formal disciple of Yang Jwing Ming and Liang Shouyu. As well he furthered his studies with Yang Zhen Duo, Chen Xiaowang and Jou Tsung Hwa. During this time he began teaching workshops and seminars in his native Canada and elsewhere. He created the "5 Section Taijiquan Program" and has published articles and films on tai chi, Xingyiquan, Baguazhang and other subjects.

From the 1990s, while continuing his research and teaching in the field of neijia, Masich began a parallel career as a performing songwriter and recording artist, working primarily with Christine Duncan and Michael Friedman and in collaboration with Michael Creber, Miles Black and others.

Other endeavours have included stints as a film and television special skills trainer and choreographer (see Black Sash (TV series)), workshop facilitator for professional actors and martial arts instructional-film maker. He is the subject of two internationally airing documentaries including Quiet Places: A Tai Chi Retreat by Omni Films.

== Works ==
=== Discography ===
Year	Album title	Artist	Role
2012	Lucky Time	Sam Masich	producer, composer, lyricist, vocalist
2006	Diamond Space	Michael Friedman	producer, lyricist
2005	Cinematic	FFM (Friedman, Fortin & Masich)	performer, writer
2005	Cow!	Aldous Orwell Project	vocalist, guitarist, songwriter
2005	Blue Manifesto	Blue Manifesto (Sam Masich & Bobby Kapp)	vocalist, guitarist, songwriter
1998	Why It Happens	Sam Masich & Christine Duncan	vocalist, guitarist, songwriter
1998	Angst Ridden Writer	Michael Friedman	lyricist
1997	Different Standards	Christine Duncan	songwriter, co-producer (with Miles Black)
1997	The Vogue Show	Christine Duncan	producer/song-writing contributor
1995	AniManiacal	Sam Masich	vocalist, songwriter
1994	Rhythm and Bliss	Moritz & the Fiddleheads	guitarist

=== Internal Arts filmography ===
Masich performing martial arts

Year	Film title	Length
2007	Sam Masich Video Classics Collection	20 hours 14 volumes
2007	Push Hands Video Manual vol. 2	45 min
2007	Yang Style Traditional 54 Taijijian	60 min
2007	Zheng Manqing Taijiquan	118 min
2004	5 Section Chen Style Taijiquan	60 min
2003	Traditional Yang Style Taijiquan 108	60 min
2002	Tai Chi in Performance	65 min
1996	5 Section Taijijian (solo sword)	80 min
1996	5 Section Taijijian (2 person sword)	70 min
1993	Balancing the Heart Qigong	80 min
1993	Tai Chi for 50+	45 min
1992/2003	Vital Xingyiquan vol. 1	70 min
1992/2003	Vital Xingyiquan vol. 2	105 min
1992	5 Section Yang Style Taijiquan	60 min
1992	5 Section Taijiquan (2 person)	40 min
1991	24 Simplified Taijiquan	90 min
1988	Tai Chi Reference Video Series	60 min
1987	Push Hands Video Manual vol. 1	40 min

== Notes ==
=== Documentaries on Sam Masich ===
The Ancient Arts of Tai Chi and Qigong (Osiris Films 1998)
Quiet Places—A Tai Chi Retreat (OMNI Films 1999)
