= John Korsrud =

Canadian composer and jazz trumpeter (born 1963)

- Born: 1963 (age 62–63); Vancouver, British Columbia
- Genres: Jazz
- Occupations: Musician, composer, educator
- Instrument: Trumpet

John Korsrud (born 1963) is a Canadian composer and jazz trumpeter.

== Life ==
John Korsrud was born in 1963. He graduated from the University of British Columbia in 1990. Korsrud studied composition with Louis Andriessen at the Royal Conservatory of Music in Amsterdam from 1995 to 1997.

Korsrud has received commissions from the Vancouver Symphony Orchestra, the American Composers Orchestra, The CBC Radio Orchestra, and Dutch ensembles such as Ensemble LOOS, the Tetzepi Bigtet, the Zapp String Quartet, De Ereprijs, among others. in 2010, Korsrud performed on his own trumpet concerto, Come to the Dark Side at Carnegie Hall in with The American Composers Orchestra.

Since 1990, he has led the 18-piece new music/jazz ensemble Hard Rubber Orchestra, with which has appeared in Europe and across Canada, recorded five albums, and in 2005 won the Alcan Arts Award. The Hard Rubber Orchestra has commissioned over 50 works from composers such as Kenny Wheeler, Darcy James Argue, John Hollenbeck, Brad Turner, Christine Jensen, Scott Good, Linda Bouchard, Rene Lussier, Anna Webber (musician), and many others.

Korsrud has also created large multimedia projects like The Elvis Cantatas (1994, 1996), The Ice Age: The World's First New Music Ice Show (2000, 2010), and Enter/Exit (2005), and The Drum & Light Festival (2008–10). The CBC produced a 70-minute version of Elvis Cantata, entitled Cantata for the King. He won the Leo Award and the Golden Sheaf Award for the music to the film Heroines (2002), and was nominated for the Gemini Award. He won another Leo Award for the film music to Prisoners of Age.

Korsrud is the recipient of the Canada Council's "Victor Martyn Lynch-Staunton Award" (2015), the City of Vancouver Mayor's Award for Music (2012), The Canada Council's Joseph S. Stauffer Prize (2001), and a fellowship from the Italian Civitella Ranieri Foundation (2003). Korsrud has performed as soloist with The Vancouver Symphony and The American Composers Orchestra.

He is currently a member of faculty at Capilano University and Vancouver Community College teaching composition and resides in Vancouver, British Columbia.

== Discography ==
- Hard Rubber Orchestra: Cruel Yet Fair, 1997 Les Disques Victo – VICTO cd059
- Orquestra Goma Dura: Live, 2000, Mother Corp Records slscd 1132
- Hard Rubber Orchestra: Rub Harder, 2001 Les Disques Victo – VICTO cd 080
- John Korsrud: Odd Jobs, Assorted Climaxes, 2005, Spool – SPP203
- John Korsrud's Hard Rubber Orchestra: Crush, 2015, self-released
- Hard Rubber Orchestra: Kenny Wheeler: Suite for Hard Rubber Orchestra, 2018 JTR
- Hard Rubber Orchestra: Iguana 2022; Redshift TK520

== Multimedia projects ==
- Solstice, 1991
- The Elvis Cantatas, 1994, 1996
- White Hot Core with Kokoro Dance, 1995
- The Ice Age: The World's First New Music Ice Show, 2000
- Enter/Exit, 2005
- Drum & Light Festival, 2008, 2009 (2010)
- The New Ice Age: New Music Ice Show, 2010

== Compositions ==
=== Chamber/Orchestra ===
- Stark Raving, Standing Wave Ensemble 1994
- Glurp, for Combustion Chamber 1997
- VAP DIST for CBC Radio Orchestra, 2000
- In a Flash for Vancouver Symphony, 2002
- Gershwin & Fire, for De Ereprijs 2003
- The Shadow of Your Smile, Vancouver New Music Society 2005
- Wood Eye for CBC Radio Orchestra, 2006
- Liquid, for Turning Point Ensemble, 2006
- Come to the Dark Side for American Composers Orchestra, 2010

== Film scores ==
- Heroines, 2002
- Drawing Out the Demons, 2004
- Prisoners of Age, 2004
- Dark Pines, 2005
- Lottery on Ice, 2005
- (Post) Modern Times, 2006
- Fatherhood Dreams, 2007
- As Slow as Possible, 2008
- Miss Landmine, 2009
- Some Kind of Love, 2014

== Compositions for video games ==
- Mario's Time Machine, 1994
