= Juno Award for Jazz Album of the Year – Group =

Musical Award for Jazz

The Juno Award for Jazz Album of the Year - Group has been awarded since 2015, as recognition each year for the best jazz album of a group in Canada.

== Winners and nominees ==
Year	Performing artist(s)	Work	Nominees	Ref.
2015	Jane Bunnett and Maqueque	Jane Bunnett and Maqueque	Andrew Downing, Jim Lewis & David Occhipinti, Bristles; Bobby Rice, Bobby Rice Latin Jazz Big Band: X-Treme Latin Jazz; Brian Dickinson Trio, Fishs Eddy; Myriad3, The Where	
2016	Allison Au Quartet	Forest Grove	Brad Turner Quartet, Over My Head; Jerry Granelli Trio, What I Hear Now; Mark Kelso & The Jazz Exiles, Stealing From My Youth; Peripheral Vision, Sheer Tyranny of Will	
2017	Metalwood	Twenty	Darcy James Argue's Secret Society, Real Enemies; Dave Young Quintet, One Way Up; Quinsin Nachoff's Flux, Flux; Order of Canada Band, Sweet Canadiana	
2018	David Braid, Mike Murley, Anders Mogensen and Johnny Aman	The North	Andrew Downing's Otterville, Otterville; Carn Davidson 9, Murphy; Christine Jensen and Ingrid Jensen, Infinitude; Ernesto Cervini's Turboprop, Rev	
2019	Andy Milne and Dapp Theory	The Seasons of Being	Allison Au Quartet, Wander Wonder; Andrew Rathbun Large Ensemble, Atwood Suites; Liebman/Murley Quartet, Live at U of T; Quinsin Nachoff's Flux, Path of Totality	
2020	Ernesto Cervini's Turboprop	Abundance	Al Muirhead's Canadian Quintet, Undertones; Brad Turner Quartet, Jump Up; Dave Young Trio, Trouble in Mind; Jane Bunnett and Maqueque, On Firm Ground / Tierra firme	
2021	Andy Milne and Unison	The reMission	Brandi Disterheft Trio with George Coleman, Surfboard; Emie R Roussel Trio, Rythme de passage; Florian Hoefner Trio, First Spring; Pat LaBarbera and Kirk MacDonald, Trane of Thought, Live at the Rex	
2022	Avataar	Worldview	Lina Allemano Four, Vegetables; Esteban Herrera, The Prophet; The David Restivo Trio, Arancina; Christine Tassan Quintette, Voyage intérieur	
2023	Florian Hoefner Trio	Desert Bloom	Andrew Rathbun Quintet, Semantics; BadBadNotGood, Talk Memory; Carn Davidson 9, The History of Us; Mark Kelso and the Jazz Exiles, The Dragon's Tail	
2024	Hilario Duran and His Latin Jazz Big Band	Cry Me a River	Allison Au with the Migrations Ensemble, Migrations; Canadian Jazz Collective, Septology: The Black Forest Session; Mike Murley and Mark Eisenman Quartet, Recent History; Nick Maclean Quartet feat. Brownman Ali, Convergence	
2025	Jeremy Ledbetter Trio	Gravity	Andy Milne and Unison, Time Will Tell; Carn Davidson 9, Reverence; Christine Jensen Jazz Orchestra, Harbour; Raagaverse, Jaya	
2026	Winnipeg Jazz Orchestra	East Meets West: Connections	Alexis Baro y la Big Band, Afrokando; Code Quartet, Code Red; The Shuffle Demons, Are You Really Real; Steve Holt Jazz Impact Quintet, Impact	
