= Allison Au =

- Genres: Jazz
- Occupation: Musician
- Instrument: Saxophone
- Years active: 1990s–present
- Website: allisonau.com

Allison Au is a Canadian jazz saxophonist. She has been nominated three times for the Juno Award for Best Jazz Album, her second album Forest Grove won the Juno for best group jazz album in 2016.

== Career ==
Au was born to a Chinese father and a Jewish mother; her maternal grandmother is a Holocaust survivor.

Au grew up in Toronto listening to her father's diverse record collection. She started classical piano lessons at age six and started playing the alto saxophone in elementary school at Grade 7 at Claude Watson School for the Arts. She graduated from Humber College's music program. She formed the Allison Au quartet in 2009.

In 2022 she joined the Ostara Project, an all-female jazz supergroup led by Jodi Proznick and Amanda Tosoff. The album was nominated for Vocal Jazz Album of the Year at the 2023 Juno Awards. The Ostara Project has toured Canada throughout 2022 and 2023, featuring other musicians such as Laila Biali, Jocelyn Gould, Shruti Ramani, Rachel Therrien, Virginia MacDonald, Valerie Lacombe, and Marianne Trudel.

In 2023 Au released Migrations with the Migrations Ensemble.

== Discography ==
- The Sky Was Pale Blue, Then Grey (2013)
- Forest Grove (2016)
- Wander Wonder (2018)
- The Ostara Project (2022) - with the Ostara Project
- Migrations (2023) - with the Migrations Ensemble

== Awards ==
- 2013 Juno Award for Best Contemporary Jazz Album (nominated)
- 2016 Juno Award for Best Group Jazz Album
- 2019 Juno Award for Jazz Album of the Year - Group (nominated)
