= Mark Kelso (drummer) =

Canadian drummer, singer, producer, bandleader, and composer

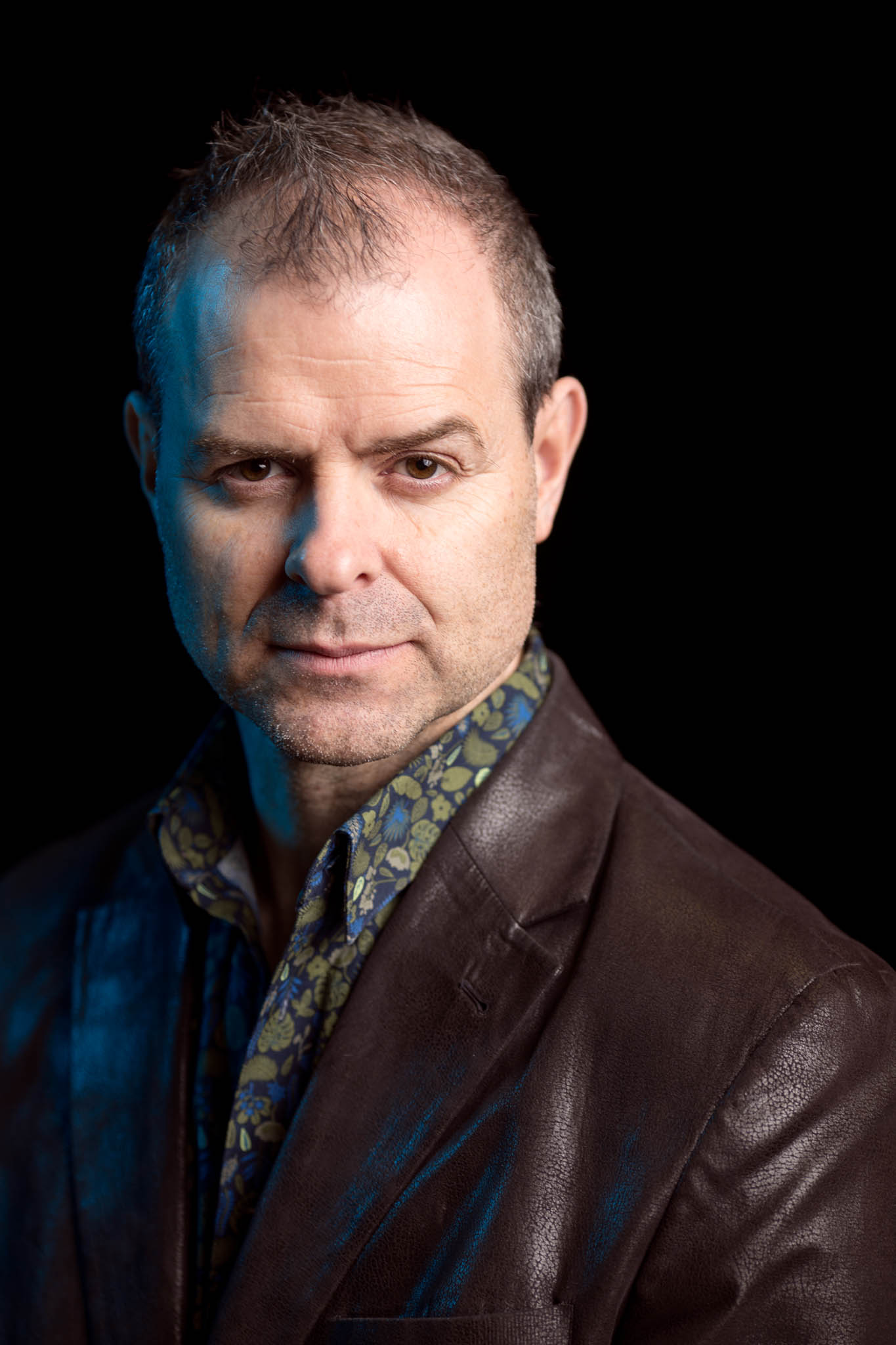
Mark Kelso - drummer, composer, band-leader

Mark Kelso is a Canadian drummer, singer, producer, bandleader, and composer. Known for his ability to play a wide variety of styles, he has performed and recorded with Pat Metheny, Donny McCaslin, Laila Biali, Michael Bublé, Holly Cole, Hilario Duran, David Foster, Dave Grusin, Herbie Hancock, Olivia Newton-John, Molly Johnson, Chaka Khan, Pat LaBarbera, Donnell Leahy, Natalie MacMaster, Bonnie Raitt, Ron Sexsmith, Ian Tyson, and Gino Vannelli.

As a band member, Kelso has received four Juno Awards and has been nominated twice as a band leader with The Jazz Exiles (2016) and The Mark Kelso Project: Chronicles of Fezziwig (2020).

== Career ==
Originally hailing from Belfast, Northern Ireland, Kelso moved to Toronto, Ontario. In 2000, he established Groovy Drums Studios.

Kelso was appointed Artistic Director of the Jazz Room in Waterloo, Ontario in 2016. He also held the position of Head of Percussion at Humber College from 2005-2021.
