= Audrey Ochoa =

Canadian trombonist

Audrey Ochoa is a jazz trombonist and composer based in Edmonton, Alberta. Her fourth album, The Head of a Mouse, was nominated for the 2025 Juno Award for solo jazz album of the year.

== Career ==
Ochoa's father Romeo is a Filipino trumpeter who has played with Tommy Banks and the Edmonton Symphony Orchestra; her mother Phyllis plays accordion. Ochoa studied music and education at University of Alberta and currently teaches as a sixth-grade music teacher.

Ochoa's 2017 sophomore album Afterthought won the 2018 Edmonton Music Prize. In 2020, she released her third album, Frankenhorn. Her 2023 album The Head of a Mouse was nominated for the 2025 Juno Award for solo jazz album of the year. Ochoa is also one of the leaders of the Canadian Ska Orchestra.
