= Will Bonness =

Canadian jazz pianist (born 1985)

Dr. Will Bonness
- Born: October 1, 1985 (age 41)
- Origin: Winnipeg, Manitoba, Canada
- Genre: Jazz
- Occupation: Musician
- Instrument: Piano
- Years active: 2000s–present

Will Bonness (born October 1, 1985) is a Canadian jazz pianist from Winnipeg, Manitoba, who won the Juno Award for Jazz Album of the Year (Solo) at the Juno Awards of 2022 for his album Change of Plans.

A graduate of the jazz program at the University of Manitoba, he is currently a professor of jazz piano at the same institution. He and faculty colleague Jon Gordon, who was a fellow Juno nominee in the same category, both played on each other's albums.

He began his career in Maynard Ferguson's band in the early 2000s, before releasing his own debut album Subtle Fire in 2009.

== Discography ==
- Subtle Fire (2009)
- Halcyon (2016)
- Change of Plans (2020)
