= Vancouver Chinese Music Ensemble =

Chinese music group

The Vancouver Chinese Music Ensemble is an ensemble of traditional Chinese musical instruments based in Vancouver, British Columbia, Canada. The ensemble performs both at concerts and at community events. Their music encompasses both traditional Chinese pieces and modern music by composers from around the world.

== History ==
The Vancouver Chinese Music Ensemble was established in 1989. The classically trained musicians perform on traditional Chinese instruments, including erhu, dizi, pipa, yangqin, guzheng, and ruan. In 1994, the band released an album, Nine-Fold Heart, on Ponchee Records. The album contained both traditional Chinese dance music and modern compositions. A second album, Transplanted Purple Bamboo, was released in 2000. Their 2005 album New Frontiers, received local radio play.

In 2007, the ensemble performed at the Mission Folk Music Festival. In 2016, they participated in the downtown concert at the Vancouver Cherry Blossom Festival. The ensemble performs regularly at the Dr. Sun-Yat Sen Classical Chinese Garden in Vancouver.

== Discography ==
- 1994 - Nine-Fold Heart
- 2000 - Transplanted Purple Bamboo
- 2005 - New Frontiers
