= Angela Verbrugge =

Canadian musician

Angela Verbrugge is a Canadian jazz vocalist, lyricist, and composer based in Victoria, British Columbia. She gained international recognition with her 2019 debut album, The Night We Couldn't Say Good Night, and was voted Best Female Vocalist in the 2020 JazzTimes Readers' Poll, surpassing Diana Krall and Cécile McLorin Salvant. Verbrugge is known for her original compositions blending bebop, vintage movie musicals, and Great American Songbook influences.

== Early life and education ==
Verbrugge was born in Kingston, Ontario. She studied classical piano as a child, played trombone in high school bands, and performed in community theater productions. She graduated from George Brown College in Toronto in Theatre Arts, becoming one of the youngest to complete the program.

In 1997, she moved to Vancouver. Following a serious car accident and a cancer diagnosis in 2010, she began to pursue jazz singing more seriously. She undertook formal study with mentors in Vancouver, New York, and Los Angeles beginning in 2012.

== Career ==
Her debut album The Night We Couldn't Say Good Night (Gut String Records, 2019) was recorded in New York City with pianist Ray Gallon, bassist Cameron Brown, and drummer Anthony Pinciotti. In 2024, Verbrugge released Somewhere on OA2 Records, a collection of jazz standards showcasing her interpretive strength and emotional range.

== Discography ==
- The Night We Couldn't Say Good Night (2019)
- Love for Connoisseurs (2022)
- Somewhere (2024)
