= Ernesto Cervini's Turboprop =

Ernesto Cervini's Turboprop is a Canadian jazz sextet from Toronto, Ontario. They are most noted for their 2019 album Abundance, which won the Juno Award for Jazz Album of the Year (Group) at the Juno Awards of 2020.

Led by drummer Ernesto Cervini, the group also includes alto saxophonist Tara Davidson, tenor saxophonist Joel Frahm, trombonist William Carn, pianist Adrean Farrugia and bassist Dan Loomis.

They were previously a Juno Award nominee in the same category at the Juno Awards of 2018 for their album Rev.
