= Steve Kaldestad =

Canadian jazz saxophonist

- Born: Saskatchewan, Canada
- Genres: Jazz
- Occupation(s): Musician, composer, educator
- Instrument: Saxophone
- Labels: Cellar Live
- Education: McGill University (BM, MM)

Steve Kaldestad is a Canadian saxophonist and music educator.

== Early life and education ==
Originally from Saskatchewan, Kaldestad attended McGill University, where he received both his bachelor's and master's degree in music. During this period, he studied under the tutelage of Lee Konitz.

== Career ==
Kaldestad has appeared on numerous recordings in Canada and the UK, where he spent eight years, playing with the BBC Big Band, the Humphrey Lyttleton Group, the Kate Williams Quartet, the Matt Wates Sextet, and the Pasadena Roof Orchestra. He has also performed with the Dan Brubeck Quartet, Kurt Rosenwinkel, Mike LeDonne, Peter Bernstein, the Daniel Hersog Jazz Orchestra, the Jaelem Bhate Jazz Orchestra, the Juno Award-winning Phil Dwyer Orchestra, and the Juno Award-nominated Jodi Proznick Quartet.

In 2015, he released his album New York Afternoon, featuring Renee Rosnes, Lewis Nash, and Peter Washington.

He is a faculty member at Capilano University. Kaldestad was also a former faculty member at Lower Canada College, where he briefly taught singer-songwriter Patrick Watson.

== Discography ==
- Steve Kaldestad Quartet. Live at Frankie's Jazz Club, CD, Cellar Live, 2022.
- Steve Kaldestad Quartet. New York Afternoon, CD, Cellar Live, 2015.
- Steve Kaldestad Quartet. Straight Up, CD, Cellar Live, 2014.
- Steve Kaldestad Quintet. Blow Up, CD, Cellar Live, 2010.
