= Jon Gordon (musician) =

American jazz saxophonist (born 1966)

Jon Gordon (born 1966 in New York City) is an American jazz saxophonist who leads the Jon Gordon Quartet. In 1996, he won first prize in the Thelonious Monk International Jazz Saxophone Competition.

He is currently a professor in the jazz program at the University of Manitoba in Winnipeg, Manitoba, Canada. He received a Juno Award nomination for Jazz Album of the Year (Solo) at the Juno Awards of 2022 for his album Stranger Than Fiction. He and faculty colleague Will Bonness, who won the award, both played on each other's albums.

== Discography ==
=== As leader/co-leader ===
- 1988: Beginnings and Endings (Taurus, 1989)
- 1992: The Jon Gordon Quartet (Chiaroscuro, 1992)
- 1994: Ask Me Now (Criss Cross Jazz, 1995)
- 1994: Spark (Chiaroscuro, 1995)
- 1995: Witness (Criss Cross Jazz, 1996)
- 1997: Along the Way (Criss Cross Jazz, 1997)
- 1998: Currents (Double-Time, 1998)
- 1999: The Things We Need (Double-Time, 1999)
- 2000?: Possibilities (Double-Time, 2000)
- 1998, 2000: Contrasts with Bill Charlap (Double-Time, 2001)
- 2005: The Things You Are (ArtistShare, 2007)
- 2009?: Evolution (ArtistShare, 2009)
- 2018: Answer (ArtistShare, 2019)
- 2021?: Stranger Than Fiction (ArtistShare, 2021)
