= Band-in-a-Box =

Music creation software package

- Developer: PG Music
- Release: 1990; 36 years ago
- Stable release: 717[Windows] 410[MacOS] / 2020
- Operating system: Windows, macOS
- Available in: Published in ten languages
- Type: Music Generation
- Website: www.pgmusic.com

Band-in-a-Box is a music creation software package for Windows and macOS produced by PG Music Incorporated, founded in 1988 in Victoria, British Columbia. The software enables a user to create any song and have it played by professional musicians playing real instruments. It does this by accessing a large database of real musicians' recordings that can be manipulated to fit any user's song. The user enters four basic keyboard inputs consisting of: chords; a key; a tempo; a musical style. The screen resembles a blank page of music onto which the user enters the names of chords using standard chord notation. The software generates a song typically played by four or five studio musicians to fit those specified parameters. The developers have enlisted musicians as supporting instrumentalists to build huge databases of phrases in many styles of music. The software retrieves and customizes groups of musical phrases that are appropriate for soloing or comping over a particular chord at a chosen key, genre and tempo. It can create backgrounds, melodies or solos for almost any chord progressions used in Western popular music, and can play them in any of thousands of different music styles.

Band-in-a-Box was first introduced in 1990 for PC computers and the Atari ST. The creator of the software is a Canadian, Dr. Peter Gannon, for whom "PG Music" is named. Early versions featured only MIDI data often emulating the phrasing of noted musicians. Subsequent versions have evolved from the artificial-sounding MIDI sounds to that of real instruments.

== Development ==
Widely known as "BIAB" by its users, the software was initially advertised as "accompaniment software" as a practice aid for musicians but became popular for "one-man bands" to play at weddings or similar venues. It became popular in karaoke venues which touted "Band in a Box Karaoke" in advertisements. Gannon said, "We started out with Band-in-a-Box as a MIDI program, generating MIDI and synth accompaniments." In late 1997, the "soloist" feature was introduced, allowing the software to generate solos choosing from a menu that includes emulations of jazz luminaries, past and present; e.g., Miles Davis or Freddie Hubbard in what reviewer Peter Hum calls "credible imitations". Jazz guitarist Geof Dresser, whose day job is a network software developer said," It's playing hipper lines than I can". Those solos were likely due to the company's musical director for many years, Vancouver Jazz guitarist Oliver Gannon, (Note: Oliver Gannon received the "Order of Canada", one of the nation's highest civilian honors (music).) the older brother of company founder Peter Gannon. Their father, Joe Gannon, was a professional pianist in Dublin, Ireland, before moving the family to Winnipeg in 1957. Oliver Gannon retired from PG Music in 2008.

== Progression from synthesized sounds to real instruments ==
Band-In-a-Box used only MIDI until 1999, when digital audio was added. The latter allowed users record their vocals and instruments directly into songs. In November 2006, PG Music released "RealDrums", which was the first step in providing users with tracks recorded by real instruments. Gannon said synthetic sounds were decreasing in popularity and real audio tracks were becoming so much easier to record. The "Audio Chord Wizard"(ACW), released with the 2007 version of BIAB, made it possible for a user to import any audio song file to be analyzed by the software. The ACW then "listens" to the song, analyses the chords, and prints out the chords in standard chord notation. From there, the user may produce sheet music for that song. Using the ACW feature requires the user to first synchronize the audio to the software; one way is manually adding bar lines by tapping a key on the downbeats as the song plays. This feature is being improved but is fraught with analysis errors if the original audio is not tuned to standard pitch or is not at a consistent tempo.

A songwriter can create a backing track, then go to "notation mode" and enter the notes on a staff to the melody he has conceived, then enter lyrics and play and print the result. Melodies and solos can be generated and these can be edited note-by-note in MIDI form.

A guitarist can input any single-note melody line (no chords) and the software can generate, as a learning tool, a Lenny Breau or Joe Pass style chord solo with chords that the user can actually reach that are shown on a screen window of a guitar fretboard. The user can specify just how close the chords must be, e.g., "within five frets".

== RealTracks ==
In 2007, "RealTracks" was introduced, providing real musicians' recordings to be manipulated to fit any user's song— pianos, bass and guitars, as well as soloing instruments such as saxophones, guitars, and pedal steel, and many others, even double bass solos and vocal group "oohs and aahs". RealTracks has significantly increased the quality of the sounds produced since the sounds are, in fact, real instruments played by real musicians. As of 2017, over 100 session players and performing musicians have contributed to Band-in-a-Box. They typically record in five different keys, with the remaining seven keys accommodated by a pitch-stretching algorithm. The musicians are requested to avoid playing across bar lines when possible on the sessions.

Band-in-a-Box "RealTracks" Demo
Piano solo (as well as all instruments) generated by BIAB, prefaced by a user-designated "push" and stop

Guitar solo generated by Band-in-a Box
Example of a guitar solo (and all other instruments) generated by Band-in-a-Box in 2019 Audiophile edition. There is a "hold" in the middle of the example, where some instruments sustain a chord (electric piano) while others stop. This is done by inputing a certain character after the chord. The solo has been muted in places; otherwise, the solo would continue through the entire song.

Later versions of the software provide the name the musician who is performing; e.g., the user can select Nashville session guitarist Brent Mason if he so chooses. RealTracks uses the élastique Pro V3 time-stretching and pitch-transposition engine by Berlin-based "zplane.development", which allows the prerecorded instruments to retain much of their natural sound when the tempo and pitch are varied. Software updates continue to widen the acceptable tempo range.

Audio files can be exported from Band-in-a-Box either mixed together or as individual tracks (one for each instrument) into any DAW for mixing, added effects and mastering. Songs created in BIAB can be burned to CD or copied to media-playing devices.

== Critics' opinions ==
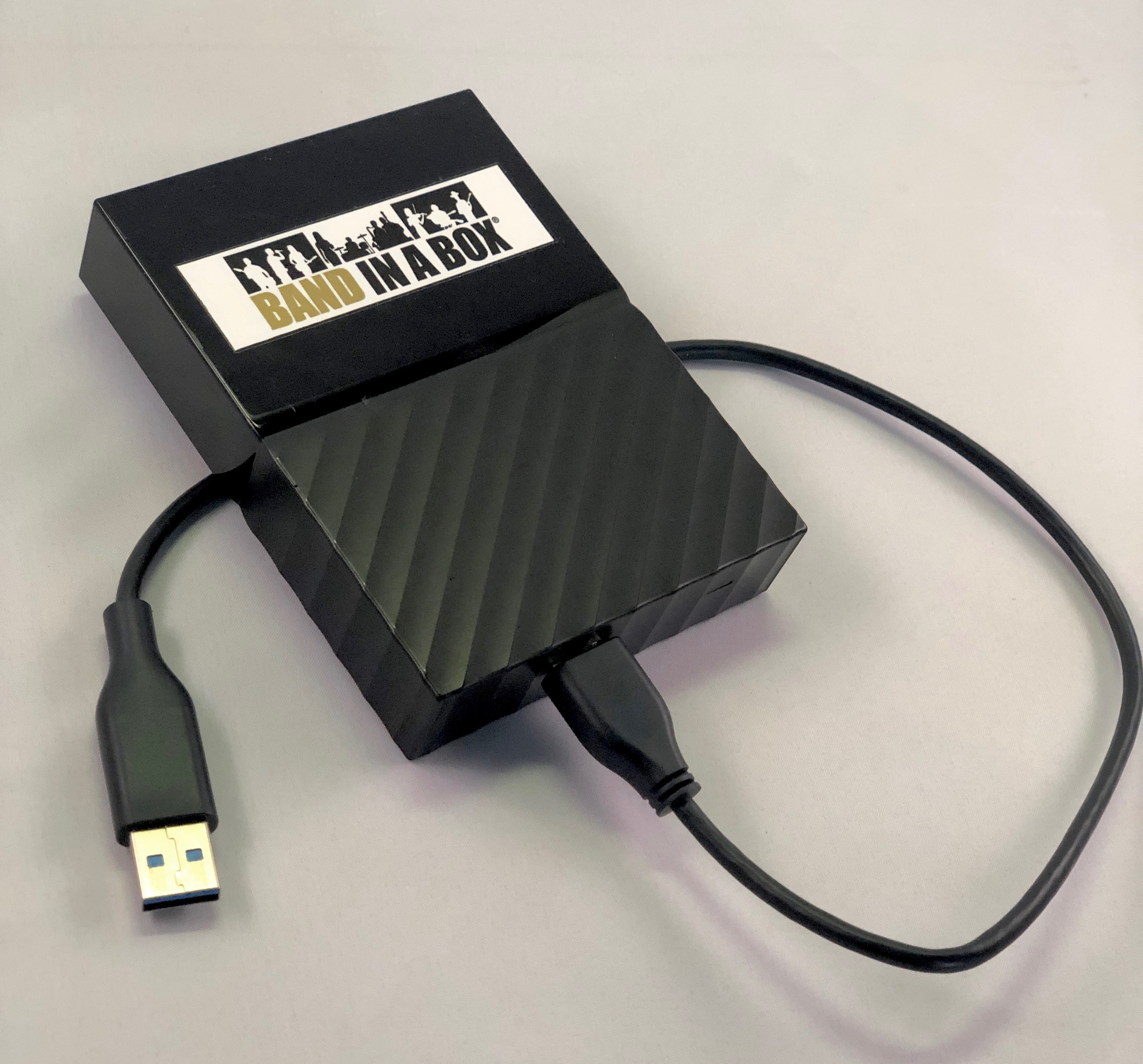
The 2018 Audiophile Version of Band-in-a-Box

The basic functions are relatively easy to master; but, as evidenced by its 675-page user's manual, there is a long learning curve to get the full benefit. The software user interface has been criticized as clunky or awkward. Reviewer Jeffrey Powers in a 2018 review said, "it looks like it came from the Windows XP era". Robert Renman at Master Guitar Academy praised the application but called the interface "quite intimidating". Added features have been grafted on the original application for years which critics say creates a "forest of hidden commands". Reviewer Jim Aiken said, "If I had to guess, I'd say the code base for this software is so multi-layered that none of the developers is quite sure what's going on in all of its nooks and crannies."

PG Music sponsors a forum which showcases thousands of original songs created by its customers. Peter Gannon said, "This really helps with visibility because people hear these songs and hear what can be done by a single songwriter using Band-in-a-Box". Several versions of BIAB are available. Deluxe versions called "Audiophile Editions" are sold preinstalled on a hard drive and include studio-quality uncompressed RealTracks files. Uncompressed RealDrums as WAV or AIFF files are also available for lossless audio use.
