= Ian McDougall (musician) =

Canadian jazz musician and academic (1938–2026)

Ian McDougall CM
- Born: Ian Walter McDougall; 14 June 1938; Calgary, Alberta, Canada
- Origin: Vancouver, British Columbia, Canada
- Died: 26 January 2026 (aged 87) Toronto, Canada
- Genre: Jazz
- Occupations: Musician; Composer; Arranger; Educator
- Instrument: Trombone
- Years active: 1960–2026
- Formerly of: The Boss Brass; The Brass Connection; Pacific Salt; R.I.O.
- Website: www.ianmcdougall.com

Ian Walter McDougall CM (14 June 1938 – 26 January 2026) was a Canadian jazz musician who played lead trombone for Rob McConnell and the Boss Brass.

== Life and career ==
McDougall was born in Calgary, Alberta, and grew up in Victoria, British Columbia. At the age of 11, he joined the Victoria Boy's Band, wanting to be a drummer. Disappointed at not playing a full drum kit, he thought he'd like to try trumpet instead, but his father intervened: "Play the trombone, son, because a good trombone player is never out of work." Starting at the age of 13, he started playing at venues around Victoria.

McDougall left Victoria in 1960 to tour in Great Britain with the John Dankworth Band. He returned to Vancouver in 1962, was a freelance player, and played with the Vancouver Symphony Orchestra and at the Cave Supper Club, under the leadership of Fraser MacPherson. He began studying at the University of British Columbia, earning a bachelor of music (1966), and master of music (1970).

In 1970, McDougall co-founded the fusion group Pacific Salt, with five of Vancouver's premier jazz musicians: guitarist Oliver Gannon, Don Clark (trumpet), Ron Johnston (piano), Tony Clitheroe (bass, bass guitar), and George Ursan (drums). Pacific Salt recorded three LPs, and was inactive by the early 1980s.

Pacific Salt bandmates McDougall, Gannon, and Johnston recorded in 1976 and 1988 and in 1990 toured the Canadian festival circuit under the name R.I.O., initials from each of their given names. McDougall reunited with Gannon and Johnston to perform as R.I.O. in 2014.

In 1973 McDougall and his wife, violinist Barbara McDougall, moved east to Toronto and began a studio career. Rob McConnell founder of The Boss Brass, invited him to join the group, and he became a featured soloist, playing with the group until 1991.

McDougall was a founding member, soloist, lead trombone, and arranger for Doug Hamilton's The Brass Connection.

McDougall composed and arranged classical music, with commissions from the Canadian Broadcasting Corporation, the Vancouver Symphony Orchestra, and the Toronto Symphony Orchestra.

McDougall died on 26 January 2026, at the age of 87.

== Musical educator ==
A sessional instructor from 1986 to 1988 at the University of British Columbia, McDougall was then invited to teach trombone, jazz studies, and orchestration at the University of Victoria in 1988, retiring as professor emeritus in 2003.

== Awards and nominations ==
In April 2008, McDougall was appointed a member of the Order of Canada.

During McDougall's time with Rob McConnell and the Boss Brass (1973–1991), the group was nominated nine times and received four Juno Awards. The Boss Brass album All In Good Time won the Grammy Award for Best Jazz Instrumental Performance, Big Band category in 1984, the album The Brass is Back was nominated in 1992.

The Brass Connection won a Juno for their eponymous album in 1982 and were nominated again in 1984 for A New Look.

As leader, Ian McDougall has had three albums nominated for the Juno: Best Traditional Jazz Album for Live Jazz Legends (2008), Instrumental Album of the Year for The Very Thought Of You (2013),, and Traditional Jazz Album for The Ian McDougall 12tet Live (2014).

== Discography ==
=== As leader ===
- The Warmth of the Horn (Concord Jazz, 1994)
- Songs & Arias (Ian McDougall, 1997)
- Nights in Vancouver (Cellar Live, 2004)
- In a Sentimental Mood (Barbarian, 2005)
- No Passport Required (Barbarian, 2007)
- Burnin' the House Down (Barbarian, 2008)
- Dry With a Twist (Ian McDougall, 2008)
- 12-Tet Live (Barbarian, 2012)
- Very Thought of You (CD Baby, 2012)

=== As featured soloist ===
- Time to Wait, Art Ellefson Sextet, featuring Ian McDougall and Kenny Wheeler, (Jazz Modus)
- In the Tradition, Fraser MacPherson Quintet featuring Ian McDougall (Concord Jazz)
- Vancouver, (Justin Time)
- Night Flight, Sammy Nestico Big Band

=== With Rob McConnell and the Boss Brass ===
- Brassy and Sassy, (Concord Jazz)
- The Brass is Back, (Concord Jazz)
- The Boss Brass Again, (UMB)
- The Boss Brass Live in Digital
- Tribute, (Pausa)
- Nobody Does it Better, (Phonodisc)
- Atras Da Porta, (Innovation)
- Boss Brass and Woods, (Innovation)
- The Best Damn Band in the Land
- Big Band Jazz, (UMB)
- The Jazz Album, (Attic)
- Present Perfect, (MPS)
- All in Good Time
- The Singers Unlimited with Rob McConnell and the Boss Brass, (MPS)

=== With the Brass Connection ===
- A 5 Star Edition, featuring Ian McDougall, Carl Fontana, Bill Watrous, and Jiggs Wigham
- A New Look (Innovation) re-released as Standards (Jazz Alliance)
- The Brass Connection, (Innovation)

=== With the Canadian Broadcasting Corporation ===
- Concerto for Clarinet and Strings, on Clarinet Concerti
- Three Canadian Folksongs, for the Vancouver Chamber Choir, on Simple Gifts
- Entre Amis, Canadian and American music for Chamber Orchestra, the Andante from the Clarinet Concerto

== See also ==
- Music of Canada
