= Linda Bouchard =

Canadian composer and conductor

- Born: 1957 (age 67–68); Montreal, Quebec, Canada
- Occupation(s): Composer, conductor

Linda Bouchard (born 21 May 1957) is a Canadian composer and conductor. She is also an active conductor, teacher and producer.

== Biography ==
Bouchard was born in Montreal, Quebec, and was raised in Montreal, Quebec. She has a BA in music (Bennington College, Vermont, 1979) and an MMus in composition (Manhattan School of Music, New York City, 1982). Her teachers were Ransom Wilson, Sue Ann Kahn, Harvey Sollberger (flute), David Gilbert and Arthur Weisberg (conducting), and Elias Tanenbaum, Ursula Mamlock and Henry Brant (composition).

She has cited Henry Brant as a major influence in her music. She has experimented with different spatial placements of performers, both as a composer and as a conductor. Her music is characterized by timbral explorations and percussive explosions.

Bouchard went to the U.S. in 1977 to study composition with Henry Brant. She lived in New York City from 1979 to 1990, where she composed, led new music ensembles, and made orchestral arrangements for The Washington Ballet, Orchestra of St. Luke's, and various churches in the New York metropolitan area. She was Assistant Conductor for New York Children's Free Opera from 1985 to 1988 and guest-conducted the Orchestra of St. Luke's, the American Dance Festival, the New York New Music Ensemble and others.

In 1991, Bouchard returned to Montreal in time for the world premiere of her composition "Elan" with l’Orchestre Métropolitain. She was composer-in-residence from 1992 to 1995 with the National Arts Centre Orchestra in Ottawa, Canada.

In 1997, she moved to San Francisco, where she currently resides with her husband and son.

In 1999, Bouchard received first prize for "Composer of the Year" from le Conseil Québecois de la Culture and the Joseph S. Stauffer Prize from the Canada Council for the Arts. Her works received five PROCAN and SOCAN awards. Her honors in the U.S. include first prizes from the Princeton Composition Contest, the Indiana State Competition, and the National Association of Composers USA Contest and a Fromm Music Foundation Award from Harvard University.

In 2005, Bouchard founded New Experimental Music, Art and Production (NEXMAP), a nonprofit arts organization that explores the intersection of traditional artistic practices and new technologies. She served as artistic director until December 2015. That year she received a Fleck Fellowship Award at the Banff Center and was also invited as a master instructor in their Music Workshop Program. Bouchard was a visiting professor at UC Berkeley during the Spring 2016,

Bouchard's latest interdisciplinary projects include "All Caps No Space", which has been performed in San Francisco, Vancouver and The Banff Centre for the Arts. She wrote a score for Detour Inc., a San Francisco–based startup that creates unique and innovative documentary tours all over the world. Her score is used for architecture tours in San Francisco, Berlin and London.

In September 2017, Bouchard received a multiyear grant from the Canada Council for the Arts to "Research and Create". Her project titled "Live Structures" will unfold over the next two years with collaborations and partnerships with François Houle, Philippe Pasquier at Metacreation in Vancouver, Lori Freedman and Sandeep Bhagwati at Matralab in Montreal and with Kyle Bruckmann in San Francisco.

== Selected works ==
=== Theatrical works ===
- The House of Words (2003), opera
- Minotaurus (1988), story
- Mr. Link (1993), music theatre for children
- Musique Défilé Fashion Show for the End of a Century (1999), theatrical fashion show
- Triskelion (1982), opera
- Identity Theft(2017) dance theatre performance
- Murderous Little World 2012, music theatre

=== Vocal music ===
- Black Burned Wood (1990), song
- Ocamow (1993), song cycle
- Pilgrims' Cantata (1996), cantata
- Risky (1993), song
- Songs for an Acrobat (1995), lieder
- A Through Line (2012) song
- Ice(1999-2014) song

=== Orchestral music ===
- Booming Sands, Viola Concerto (1998)
- Élan (1990)
- Eternity (1996)
- Exquisite Fires (1993)
- Fanorev (1986)
- Fashion Show (1999)
- The Open Life (2000)
- Ressac (1991)
- Vertige (1994)
- Fanorev (1986)
- Réfraction (2015)
- Flocking for Orchestra 2018
- L'automne (2007)

=== Large chamber ensemble ===
- Brasier (2001)
- Compressions (1996)
- Frisson, La Vie, Duo Concertante for flute, viola and strings (1992)
- Ire (1992)
- Neiges (2002)
- Oracles (1997)
- Reveling of Men (1988)
- Second Survival (2009-2016)
- Lend Me Wings (2016)
- THe Dog Ate (2011)
- Joint Venture (2008)
- L'échappée d'ailes (2004)

=== Chamber music ===
- Amuser Le Temps (1989)
- Circus Faces (1983)
- Icy Cruise (1984)
- Delicate Contract (1988)
- Ductwork (1997)
- Le Scandale (1989)
- Le Scandale II (2002)
- Muskoday (1988)
- Possible Nudity for solo viola, cello, string bass, harp and percussion (1987)
- Possible Nudity for viola with cello and piano (1988)
- Pourtinade for viola and percussion (1983)
- Propos II (1985)
- Propos III (1984)
- Propos IV (1984)
- Propos Nouveaux (1988)
- Pulsing Flight (1985)
- Reciproque (1994)
- Sept Couleurs (1994)
- Swift Silver (1989)
- Tossing Diamonds (1983)
- Transi-Blanc (1987)
- Transi-Blanc (revised – 1987)
- Phare Far(2014)
- Liquid Sates (2004)

=== String quartet ===
- Lung Ta (1992)
- Stormy Light (1982)
- Traces (1996)

=== Solo works ===
- Glances (1980)
- Propos (1983)
- Tokpela (1989)
- Orchid (2015
- Bref (2014)
- Gassho (2011)
- Glances (1980)
