= Oliver Gannon =

Irish-born Canadian jazz guitarist

Oliver Gannon CM
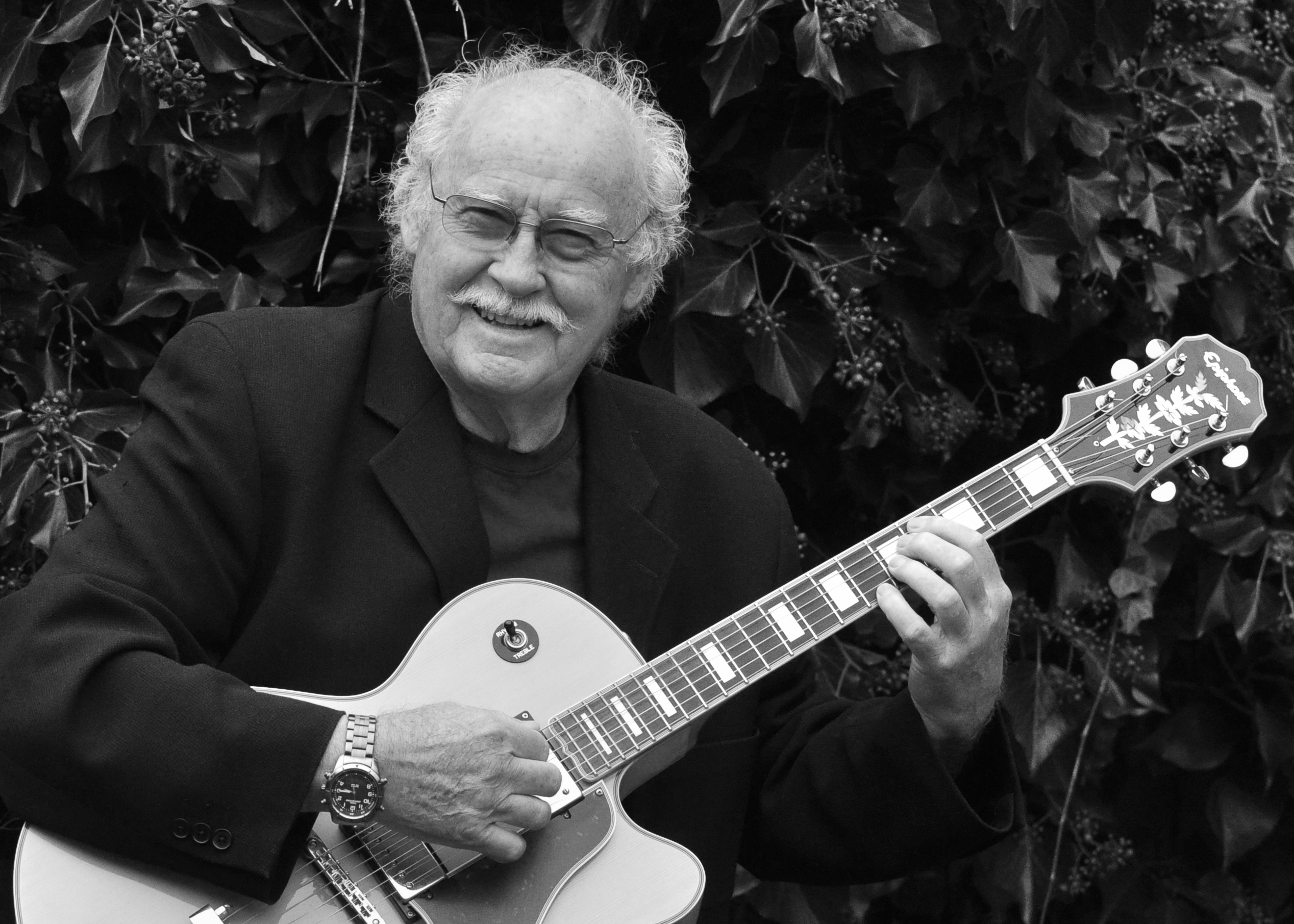
- Oliver Gannon in 2015; Photo by Pat Gannon

Background information
- Born: Oliver Plunkett Gannon; 23 March 1943 (age 83); Dublin, Ireland
- Origin: Vancouver, British Columbia, Canada
- Genre: Jazz
- Occupations: Musician, songwriter, arranger, educator
- Instrument: Guitar
- Years active: 1961 – present
- Website: olivergannon.com

Oliver Gannon CM (born 23 March 1943) is an Irish-born Canadian jazz guitarist.

== Early life ==
The eldest son of Irish jazz pianist Joe Gannon, Oliver Gannon was born in Dublin, Ireland, and emigrated with his family to Winnipeg, Canada, in 1957 when he was 14. He began playing in his late teens, after he purchased a Gibson ES-125 electric guitar and amplifier with his leftover tuition money earned from his summer job.

Gannon enrolled at the University of Manitoba to study engineering but changed his mind. "I remember a thermodynamics class at 8 o'clock in the morning, having been playing the night before, and the blackboard was full of the Second Law of Thermodynamics or something, and I looked up at that and said, 'Is this what I want to do for the rest of my life, or do I want to do what I was doing last night?' A light bulb went off and I literally got up in the middle of the class, walked out, and never came back." In 1964, he was accepted at the Berklee College of Music, where he studied composition and arranging with Herb Pomeroy and William Malloff, graduating in 1969. He credits this period in Boston with his exposure to jazz musicians such as Wes Montgomery, Wynton Kelly, Jimmy Cobb, and Paul Chambers.

== Career ==
Returning to Canada in 1969, Gannon settled in Vancouver, where he became a popular session musician. He worked often at the Cave Supper Club, joining Fraser MacPherson's big band. "The Cave band was such a joy to play," remembers Gannon. "These guys were such excellent readers... They would play a brand new show perfectly the first time."

In 1970 he co-founded the fusion group Pacific Salt with trombonist Ian McDougall, Don Clark (trumpet), Ron Johnston (piano), Tony Clitheroe (double bass, bass guitar), and George Ursan (drums). Pacific Salt recorded three albums and was inactive by the early 1980s. McDougall, Gannon, and Johnston recorded as a trio in 1976 and 1988. In 1990, they toured Canadian festivals under the name RIO.

In 1975 Gannon was invited by MacPherson to form a trio with bassist Wyatt Ruther. The collaboration lasted until MacPherson's death in 1993. With MacPherson's trio, Fraser & Friends, Gannon toured the U.S.S.R an unprecedented four times starting in 1978. The trio was the first Canadian group to tour the Soviet Union under the Soviet-Canadian Cultural Exchange Treaty. The group intended to play nine concerts in Moscow and Leningrad, but the schedule was expanded to thirteen. The group became the first North American jazz ensemble to be invited back, and they toured again in 1981, 1984, and 1986.

Gannon has participated in groups in the Vancouver area and has played at most major festivals in the world: Montreux Jazz Festival (1979); North Sea Jazz Festival (1979); Concord Jazz Festival (1981); Montreal Jazz Festival (1982, 1984, 1995, 1997); Toronto Jazz Festival (1986, 1989, 1995, and 1998), Edmonton's Jazz City (1985), and appearances in his home town at the Vancouver International Jazz Festival.

Gannon was the musical director for PG Music, a software company founded by his younger brother, Peter Gannon. He was with the company since its inception in 1989 and served as the executive producer of program content. He performed and produced content for the company's Band-in-a-Box. Gannon retired from the company in 2008.

He was married to singer and bassist Patty Hervey.

== Style ==
With MacPherson, Gannon employed an orchestral accompaniment style, while on his own recordings he displayed a linear, bop-based style, showing his roots as an admirer of Barney Kessel and Wes Montgomery, and Art Blakey.

Other critics have noted Gannon's "slick, cool stylings", and "studies in careful and complete orchestration. His lines could be crisp and harmonically advanced, or fluid and lyrical."

== Awards and honors ==
- Juno Award, Best Traditional Jazz Album, I Didn't Know About You with Fraser MacPherson, 1983
- Guitarist of the Year, National Jazz Awards (Canada), 2003
- Member of the Order of Canada, 2017

== Discography ==
=== As leader ===
- Three with Ron Johnston & Ian McDougall (Energy 1976)
- I Didn't Know About You with Fraser MacPherson (Sackville, 1980)
- Rio with Ron Johnston & Ian McDougall (Innovation, 1988)
- Live at the Cellar (Cellar Live, 2002)
- That's What (Cellar Live, 2004)
- Two Much Guitar (Cellar Live, 2006)
- Two Much More (Cellar Live, 2015)

With Pacific Salt

- Pacific Salt (Gramophone, 1973)
- Jazz Canadiana (CBC, 1973)
- Live Litte (Mountain Sound, 1976)

=== As sideman ===
With Fraser MacPherson

- Live at the Planetarium (West End, 1976)
- Honey and Spice (Justin Time, 1987)
- Encore (Justin Time, 1990)
- In the Tradition (Concord Jazz, 1992)

With Ian McDougall

- The Warmth of the Horn (Concord Jazz, 1995)
- In a Sentimental Mood (Barbarian, 2005)
- The Very Thought of You (Ten Mile Music, 2012)

With others

- Gary Guthman, Moonchild (Intercan, 1980)
- Dave Robbins, The Dave Robbins Band (CBC, 1970)
- Vancouver Chamber Choir, Simple Gifts (CBC, 1991)
- Karen Young, Karen Young (Radio Canada, 1981)

== See also ==
- Music of Canada
