= Marianne Trudel =

Canadian musician

Marianne Trudel (born July 28, 1977) is a Canadian pianist, improviser, composer and arranger. She has collaborated with Chucho Valdes, Kenny Wheeler, Mark Feldman, Ingrid Jensen and David Liebman among others; as well as releasing 8 recordings as a leader.Trudel teaches at McGill University (Schulich School of Music) and at Cégep de Saint-Laurent.

As a performer, she pursues an active career in a variety of settings ranging from solo performance to: Trudel-Young, Trifolia, Marianne Trudel 4 + Ingrid Jensen, Trudel-Hollenbeck, and large ensembles.

== Early life ==
Trudel was born in Saint-Michelle-de-Bellechasse, Quebec, Canada. Her parents were interested in Francophone songwriters from Quebec and classical music, which became major influences in her later work. In the mid-'90s she attended the Cégep de St. Laurent college prep program and then went on to obtain a B.A. in Jazz Performance at McGill University in 2001, studying with Jan Jarczyck. She earned her master's degree in ethnomusicology from the University of Montreal in 2006, and two additional degrees in jazz arranging and classical piano.

== Career ==
Trudel attended various workshops in Europe and North America, including the Banff Centre for the Arts, the Vancouver Creative Music Institute and the Henry Mancini Institute in Los Angeles.

She is a twice-nominated Juno Awards artist, for the years 2014 and 2015. "Le Refuge", with Trifolia, was nominated for Contemporary Album Of The Year, and "La Vie Commence Ici" was nominated for Jazz Album Of The Year: Solo.

With her quintet she was the recipient of the Stingray Rising Stars Award for the best composition at the Montreal International Jazz Festival, in 2007.

== Discography ==
=== As a leader or co-leader ===
- Time Poem: La joie de l'éphémère (2022): Marianne Trudel, John Hollenbeck, Rémi-Jean Leblanc,
- Portraits: Songs of Joni Mitchell (2018): Marianne Trudel & Karen Young
- La vie commence ici — Marianne Trudel featuring Ingrid Jensen (Justin Time Records 2014) — Nomination at Juno Awards, Nomination ADISQ 2015
- Le Refuge, Trifolia (2013) — Prix Opus 2013 & Nomination at Juno Awards
- Espoir et autres pouvoirs, Marianne Trudel Septet (Effendi Records 2011) — Nomination at ADISQ 2011 & Finalist at Opus 2010-11
- L’embarquée, Duo Trudel-Bourbonnais (2009)
- Sands of Time (Live), Quintette Marianne Trudel (2007)
- Espaces libres (2005), solo piano

== Publications ==
Her composition "La Vie Commence Ici" is featured on Terri Lyne Carrington's: New Standards - 101 Lead Sheets by Women Composers.
