= P. J. Perry =

- Born: Paul John Guloien; December 2, 1941 (age 84); Calgary, Alberta, Canada
- Genres: Jazz
- Occupation: Musician
- Instrument: Saxophone
- Years active: 1978–present
- Labels: Royalty, The Jazz Alliance, Unity, Justin Time
- Website: www.pjperry.com

Paul John Guloien CM (born December 2, 1941) is a Canadian jazz saxophonist. He has won one Juno award as a solo artist, and one for his work with the Rob McConnell Tentet.

== Early life ==
Perry was born to saxophonist Paul Guloien, who performed under the name Paul Perry, and Margaret Yeo. Early in life they moved around Canada between Medicine Hat, Regina, Sylvan Lake and Vancouver. He learned to play the clarinet and piano before becoming a saxophonist for his father's band when he was 14. Perry has spent most of his time in Canada.

== Career ==
As a young man, Perry played at Sylvan Lake and in various Vancouver night clubs.

Perry's album Time Flies was recorded in 2003 and 2004, and released on the Justin Time label in 2005.

== Awards and honours ==
- Juno Award for Best Jazz Album, 1993
- Best Alto Saxophone, Critics' Choice, Jazz Report magazine, 1993–1997
- Best Large Jazz Ensemble Album, Juno Award, with Rob McConnell Tentet, 2001
- Saxophonist of the Year, National Jazz Awards Canada, 2003
- Lifetime Achievement Award, City of Edmonton, 2005
- Honorary Diploma in Music, Grant MacEwan College, Edmonton, 1996
- Honorary doctorate of law, University of Alberta, 2007
- Order of Canada with grade of member, 2016

== Discography ==
- My Ideal (Unity, 1989)
- Worth Waiting For (Jazz Alliance, 1990 )
- With the Edmonton Symphony Orchestra (Justin Time, 2000 )
- P. J. Perry Quintet (Unity/Page, 2004)
- Time Flies (Justin Time, 2005 )
- Joined at the Hip (Cellar Live, 2007)
- Nota Bene (2009)
- Old Friends (Royalty, 2014)
