= Christine Jensen (musician) =

- Born: 1970; Nanaimo, British Columbia, Canada
- Genres: Jazz

Christine Jensen is a composer, conductor, and saxophonist based in Montreal, Quebec, Canada. She was awarded the Juno Award for Contemporary Jazz Album of the Year for her albums Treelines (2011) and Habitat (2014). She is the sister of trumpeter Ingrid Jensen.

Jensen received her Bachelor's degree in Jazz Performance at McGill University in 1994, and later her Master's in 2006. She has studied under the tutelage of Pat LaBarbera, Jim McNeely, Kenny Werner, and Steve Wilson.

Jensen has collaborated with many artists including her sister, Ingrid, Ben Monder, Lorne Lofsky, Allison Au, Phil Dwyer, Donny McCaslin, Geoffrey Keezer, Brad Turner, and Lenny Pickett.

She is a former faculty member at McGill University's Schulich School of Music, as well as current Assistant Professor of Jazz Studies at Eastman School of Music.

== Discography ==
- 2000 - Collage
- 2002 - A Shorter Distance
- 2006 - Look Left
- 2011 - Treelines - Christine Jensen Jazz Orchestra
- 2013 - Transatlantic Conversations: 11 Piece Band
- 2014 - Habitat - Christine Jensen Jazz Orchestra
- 2016 - Infinitude
- 2017 - Under the Influence Suite - Orchestre National de Jazz de Montreal
- 2020 - Genealogy - Code Quartet
- 2023 - Day Moon
- 2024 - Harbour - Christine Jensen Jazz Orchestra
