= Brad Turner (musician) =

Canadian composer and jazz trumpeter

- Born: January 29, 1967 (age 59); Langley, British Columbia, Canada
- Genres: Jazz, jazz fusion
- Occupations: Musician, composer, educator
- Instruments: Trumpet, flugelhorn, piano, drums
- Years active: 1990s–present
- Label: Cellar Live
- Website: bradturnermusic.com

Brad Turner is a Canadian jazz pianist, trumpeter, composer, bandleader and educator. He has won three Juno Awards and six Canadian National Jazz Awards for categories including Jazz Trumpeter of the Year, Jazz Composer of the Year, and Musician of the Year.

== Career ==
Turner played and composed for the One O'Clock Lab Band.

Turner lives in Vancouver, British Columbia, and was on faculty at Capilano University in North Vancouver, where he taught for over three decades before he retired in 2026. He was also the director of Capilano University's A band ensemble from the late 1990s until his retirement.

== Awards ==
- 2020: Juno Award for Jazz Album of the Year – Group nomination (for "Jump Up", with Brad Turner Quartet)
- 2017: Juno Award for Best Group Jazz Album (For album Twenty, with Metalwood)
