= Bentley (surname) =

Bentley is an English surname. Notable people with the surname include:

== A–I ==
- Arthur F. Bentley (1870–1957), American political scientist
- Alex Bentley (born 1990), Belarusian basketball player
- Alondra Bentley (born 1983), Spanish singer-songwriter
- Amy Bentley (born 1962), American nutritional scientist
- Andrew Bentley (born 1985), French rugby player
- Bev Bentley (1927–2023), Canadian ice hockey player
- Beverly Bentley (1930–2018), American actress
- Bill Bentley (footballer) (born 1947), English footballer
- Bill Bentley (record producer) (born 1950), American record company executive and record producer
- Bobby Bentley (active since 1986), American football coach
- Charles Bentley (painter) (1806–1854), English painter
- Christine Bentley (active since 1977), Canadian television journalist
- Cy Bentley (1850–1873), American baseball player
- Dallen Bentley (born 2000), American football player
- Daniel Bentley (disambiguation)
  - Dan Bentley (born 1984), British Paralympic boccia player
  - Dan Bentley (footballer) (born 1993), English footballer
  - Daniel S. Bentley (1850–1916), American minister, writer, newspaper founder
  - Danny Bentley, American politician and pharmacologist
- David Bentley (born 1984), English footballer
- Denzel Bentley (born 1995), English professional boxer
- Derek Bentley (1933–1953), English subject of a controversial court case
- Dierks Bentley (born 1975), American country music singer
- Doug Bentley (1916–1972), Canadian ice hockey player
- Edmund Clerihew Bentley (1875–1956), British author and humorist
- Elizabeth Bentley (writer) (1767–1839), British poet
- Elizabeth Bentley (1908–1963), American spy for the Soviet Union
- Eric Bentley (1916–2020), critic, playwright, singer, editor and translator
- Ester F. Bentley (1915–2004), American social worker, community organizer
- Fonzworth Bentley (born 1974), American entertainer and designer, former assistant to Diddy
- Geoffrey Bryan Bentley (1909–1996), English priest
- Gladys Bentley (1907–1960), American blues singer
- Greg Bentley (born 1987), Australian football player
- Handel Bentley (1871–1945), English footballer
- Helen Delich Bentley (1923–2016), American politician
- Irene Bentley (1870–1940), American actress

== J–Z ==
- Jack Bentley (disambiguation), various people
- Jake Bentley (born 1997), American football player
- Jason Bentley (born 1970), American DJ
- Ja'Whaun Bentley (born 1996), American football player
- Jay Bentley (born 1964), American bassist for Bad Religion
- John Bentley (disambiguation), various people
- Jon Bentley (computer scientist) (born 1953), American computer scientist
- Jon Bentley (TV presenter) (born 1961), English television presenter
- Jonny Bentley (born 1986), New Zealand rugby union player
- Kane Bentley (born 1987), French rugby player
- Ken Bentley (active since 2008), British drama director
- Kirsty Bentley (1983–1998), New Zealand murder victim
- LeCharles Bentley (born 1979), American football player
- Lester W. Bentley (1908–1972), American artist from Wisconsin
- Marcus Bentley (born 1967), British actor, broadcaster and voice-over artist
- Mark Bentley (born 1978), English football player/manager
- Matt Bentley (born 1979), American professional wrestler
- Max Bentley (1920–1984), Canadian ice hockey player
- Michael Bentley (disambiguation), various people
- Nancy Bentley, American professor of English
- Naomi Bentley (born 1981), British actress
- Nicolas Bentley (1907–1978), British author and illustrator
- Percy Bentley (1906–1982), Australian football player
- Phyllis Bentley (1894–1977), English novelist
- Richard Bentley (1662–1742), English classical scholar
- Richard Bentley (publisher) (1794–1871), English printer and publisher of Bentley's Miscellany
- Robert Bentley (disambiguation), various people
- Roseann Bentley (1936–2025), American politician from Missouri
- Roy Bentley (1924–2018), English footballer
- Russell Bentley (1960–2024), American pro-Russian activist and participant in the Russo-Ukrainian war
- Samantha Bentley (born 1987), English pornographic actress
- Thomas Bentley (director) (1884–1966), English film director
- Thomas Bentley (manufacturer) (1731–1780), English businessmen
- Tom Bentley, British political advisor
- Toni Bentley (born 1958), Australian-American dancer and writer
- Tony Bentley (1939–2024), English footballer
- Ulysses Bentley IV (born 2000), American football player
- Walter Bentley (actor) (1849–1927), Australian actor
- Wes Bentley (born 1978), American actor
- Wilson Bentley (1865–1931), American photographer of snowflakes
- W. O. Bentley (1888–1971), British engineer, founder of Bentley Motors

== Fictional characters ==
- Bernard Bentley, from Bob the Builder
- Harry Bentley (The Jeffersons), from The Jeffersons
- Jim Bently, from short stories by Henry Lawson

== See also ==
- Bently (disambiguation)#People
