= Bently =

Bently may refer to:

== People ==
- Donald E. Bently (1924–2012), an American entrepreneur and engineer
- Fenis Bently (fl. 1905–1911), an American football coach
- Nelson Bentley (1918–1990), an American poet and professor
- Peter Bently (born 1960), a British children's writer
- Bently Elliott, an American writer and President Reagan's speechwriter
- Bently Spang (born 1960), a Northern Cheyenne artist, writer, and curator

== Places ==
- Bently Nob Hill, an apartment building in Nob Hill, San Francisco, U.S.
- Bently Reserve, the Old Federal Reserve Bank of San Francisco Building, U.S.

== Other uses ==
- Bently Nevada, the Condition Monitoring and Protection division of Baker Hughes
- Jim Bently, a fictional character in short stories by Henry Lawson

== See also ==
- Bentley (disambiguation)
- Bentleigh (disambiguation)
