= Salem witchcraft trial (1878) =

American civil case

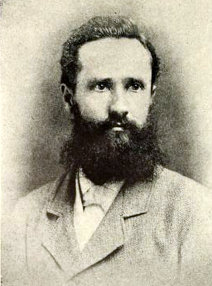
- Daniel Spofford, the accused in the trial.
- Court: Supreme Judicial Court in Salem
- Decided: 1878

Court membership
- Judge sitting: Horace Gray

The Salem witchcraft trial of 1878, also known as the Ipswich witchcraft trial and the second Salem witch trial, was an American civil case held in May 1878 in Salem, Massachusetts, in which Lucretia L. S. Brown, an adherent of the Christian Science religion, accused fellow Christian Scientist Daniel H. Spofford of attempting to harm her through his "mesmeric" mental powers. By 1918, it was considered the last witchcraft trial held in the United States. The case garnered significant attention for its startling claims and the fact that it took place in Salem, the scene of the 1692 Salem witch trials. The judge dismissed the case.

== Background ==
Daniel Spofford was one of the earliest adherents of Mary Baker Eddy (then known as Mary Baker Glover). Spofford was born in New Hampshire and grew up as a menial laborer and watchmaker's apprentice in eastern Massachusetts. At 19, he enlisted in the United States Army and served in the American Civil War. After the war, he worked in a shoemaker's shop in Lynn, Massachusetts, and around 1867 obtained copies of some of Glover's early writings on Christian Science. Spofford left Lynn to travel out west, but returned to Lynn in 1870 and met Glover. Spofford took one of Glover's classes in metaphysical healing in the early spring of 1875, and graduated in April.

Immediately thereafter, Spofford organized a group of Christian Science students to provide financial support to Glover (so that she might continue to teach them the tenets of her religious beliefs) and to rent a meeting space for them. He also set up several offices around the area to practice Christian Science healing, and began calling himself "Dr. Daniel Spofford". When Glover had difficulty finding a publisher for her book, Science and Health with Key to the Scriptures, Spofford acted as publisher, while fellow students George Barry and Elizabeth Newhall financed the publication. Spofford even distributed handbills alongside Glover to promote the book. He also introduced Glover to her future husband, Asa Gilbert Eddy. Glover and Eddy soon married, and Spofford was asked to help arrange the ceremony. The now-Mrs. Eddy continued to ask Spofford for assistance in handling the mental drain of her many students and the preparations for the second edition of her book.

In the spring of 1877, while Eddy was vacationing, she and Spofford disagreed over the publication terms of the second edition of Science and Health with Key to the Scriptures. On January 19, 1878, Spofford was expelled from the Association of Christian Scientists on grounds of "immorality". Eddy then sued Spofford for unpaid tuition, but lost the suit. Eddy and Spofford broke completely shortly thereafter. Modern commentators claim that Spofford felt shut out by Asa Eddy.

=== Role of Christian Science teaching in the case ===
In her writings, Mary Baker Eddy developed the concept of "malicious animal magnetism" (MAM), seemingly a form of hypnosis or possibly mental control or mental energy which could harm others. Chapter V of the first edition of Science and Health with Key to the Scriptures was titled "Animal Magnetism Exposed", and explained how the mind can cure itself but also harm others ("mind crime"). Eddy apparently believed that such "mind crimes" could be stopped by having people in close physical proximity to her so she could "intercept" these mental emanations.

MAM proved to be a lifelong concern of Eddy's after 1878. She rushed a truncated, second edition of Science and Health into print in 1878 so that her thinking on the issue could become public as soon as possible, and her lectures paid increasing attention to the issue. In 1881, a more complete, two-volume edition of Science and Health appeared, with the chapter on MAM greatly expanded and retitled "Demonology". (Later editions would remove this term from Science and Health.)

== Lawsuit ==
Lucretia Brown was a 50-year-old woman who lived in Ipswich, Massachusetts, a town about 12 miles (19 km) northeast of Salem, Massachusetts. An injury to her spine during childhood left her disabled, but she said Christian Science had healed her. She suffered a relapse in 1877 and again in 1878, and accused Spofford of having interfered with her health through "mesmerism". Her lawsuit stated:

...that Daniel H. Spofford, of Newburyport, ... is a mesmerist, and practices the art of mesmerism, and by his said art and the power of his mind influences and controls the minds and bodies of other persons, and uses his said power and art for the purposes of injuring the persons and property and social relations of others and does by said means so injure them.

And plaintiff further showeth that the said Daniel H. Spofford has at divers times and places since the year eighteen-hundred and seventy-five wrongfully and maliciously and with intent to injure the plaintiff, caused the plaintiff by means of his said power and art great suffering of body and mind, and spinal pains and neuralgia and a temporary suspension of mind, and still continues to cause the plaintiff the same.

And the plaintiff has reason to fear and does fear that he will continue in the future to cause the same. And the plaintiff says that the said injuries are great and of an irreparable nature, and that she is wholly unable to escape from the control and influence he so exercises upon her and from the aforesaid effects of said control and influence.

At least one witness claims that Eddy's attorney drew up the complaint for Brown. Eddy strenuously denied this. Some modern scholars have concluded that Brown acted without Eddy's influence, but others have asserted that Eddy was behind the suit.

The trial at the Supreme Judicial Court in Salem opened on May 14, 1878. Judge Horace Gray presided. Mary Baker Eddy and 21 other witnesses traveled to Salem to testify against Spofford. Judge Gray ordered Spofford to appear on May 17. The case garnered widespread attention from the media, with articles appearing in The Boston Globe, Newburyport Herald, and Salem Observer.

On May 17, Amos Noyes, Spofford's attorney (appearing on behalf of his client who did not attend the trial), filed a demurrer with the court, arguing that there was no question in equity and that the court had no jurisdiction in the case.

Brown's attorney, Edward Arens, claimed that mesmerism was an acknowledged fact and challenged the demurrer. Judge Gray dismissed the case, noting the claim was vague and the complaint "framed without a knowledge of the law of equity". The court ruled it was not clear how it could prevent such mental control, even if it were to imprison Spofford. Brown appealed the court's ruling, but the appeal was dismissed in November 1878.

One critical observer called the trial "one of the most bizarre court-room sessions ever held in the United States". Eddy was strongly criticized in the press over the case.

== See also ==
- Salem witch trials

== Bibliography ==
- Anker, Roy M. (1999). Self-Help and Popular Religion in Modern American Culture: An Interpretive Guide. Westport, Connecticut: Greenwood Press.
- Braden, Charles Samuel (1959). Christian Science Today: Power, Policy, Practice. London: Allen & Unwin.
- Davin, Edwin F. (1930). Mrs. Eddy: The Biography of a Virginal Mind. New York City: Scribner's.
- Fraser, Caroline (1999). God's Perfect Child. Metropolitan Books. ISBN 9780805044300.
- Gallagher, Eugene V.; Ashcraft, William M. (2006). Introduction to New and Alternative Religions in America: Volume 5, African Diaspora Traditions and Other American Innovations. Santa Barbara, California: Greenwood Publishing.
- Glover, Mary Baker (1875). Science and Health (1st ed.). Boston: Christian Science Publishing Company.
- James, Edward T; James, Janet Wilson; Boyer, Paul S. (1971). Notable American Women, 1607–1950: A Biographical Dictionary. Cambridge, Massachusetts: Belknap Press of Harvard University Press.
- Jastrow, Joseph (2009). The Psychology of Conviction (Reprint ed.). Charleston, South Carolina: BiblioLife.
- Mizruchi, Susan L. (2005). "Cosmopolitan Variations". In Bercovitch, Sacvan (ed.). The Cambridge History of American Literature Vol. 3, Prose Writing 1860–1920. Cambridge: Cambridge University Press.
- Moore, R. Laurence (1986). Religious Outsiders and the Making of Americans. New York City: Oxford University Press.
- Nenneman, Richard A. (1997). Persistent Pilgrim: The Life of Mary Baker Eddy. Nebbadoon Press.
- Pickering, David (2002). Cassell's Dictionary of Witchcraft. Cassell.
- Podmore, Frank (1909). Mesmerism and Christian Science: A Short History of Mental Healing. Philadelphia: G. W. Jacobs.
- Springer, Fleta Campbell (1930). According to the Flesh: A Biography of Mary Baker Eddy. New York City: Coward-McCann, Inc.
- Tucker, Ruth (1989). Another Gospel: Alternative Religions and the New Age Movement. Grand Rapids, Michigan: Zondervan Publishing House. ISBN 9780310404408.
- Wilbur, Sibyl (1966). The Life of Mary Baker Eddy. Boston: Christian Science Publishing Society.
- Wills, Garry (1995). Certain Trumpets: The Nature of Leadership (Paperback ed.). New York City: Simon & Schuster.
