= Charles Bentley =

Charles Bentley may refer to:

- Charles R. Bentley (1929–2017), Arctic geographer
- Charles Eugene Bentley (1841–1905), American politician
- Charles Edwin Bentley (1859–1929), American dentist
- Charles Bentley (painter) (1806–1854), English painter
- Dick Bentley (Charles Walter Bentley, 1907–1995), Australian comedian and actor
- Chuck Bentley (born 1957), American chief executive officer for Crown Financial Ministries

== See also ==
- Bentley (disambiguation)
