= Eddy current =

Loops of electric current induced within conductors by a changing magnetic field

In electromagnetism, an eddy current (also called Foucault's current) is a loop of electric current induced within conductors by a changing magnetic field in the conductor according to Faraday's law of induction or by the relative motion of a conductor in a magnetic field. Eddy currents flow in closed loops within conductors, in planes perpendicular to the magnetic field. They can be induced within nearby stationary conductors by a time-varying magnetic field created by an AC electromagnet or transformer, for example, or by relative motion between a magnet and a nearby conductor. The magnitude of the current in a given loop is proportional to the strength of the magnetic field, the area of the loop, and the rate of change of flux, and inversely proportional to the resistivity of the material. When graphed, these circular currents within a piece of metal look vaguely like eddies or whirlpools in a liquid.

By Lenz's law, an eddy current creates a magnetic field that opposes the change in the magnetic field that created it, and thus eddy currents react back on the source of the magnetic field. For example, a nearby conductive surface will exert a drag force on a moving magnet that opposes its motion, due to eddy currents induced in the surface by the moving magnetic field. This effect is employed in eddy current brakes which are used to stop rotating power tools quickly when they are turned off. The current flowing through the resistance of the conductor also dissipates energy as heat in the material. Thus eddy currents are a cause of energy loss in alternating current (AC) inductors, transformers, electric motors and generators, and other AC machinery, requiring special construction such as laminated magnetic cores or ferrite cores to minimize them. Eddy currents are also used to heat objects in induction heating furnaces and equipment, and to detect cracks and flaws in metal parts using eddy-current testing instruments.

== Origin of term ==
The term eddy current comes from analogous currents seen in water in fluid dynamics, causing localised areas of turbulence known as eddies giving rise to persistent vortices. Somewhat analogously, eddy currents can take time to build up and can persist for very long times in conductors due to their inductance.

== History ==
The first person to observe eddy currents was François Arago (1786–1853). In 1824 he observed what has been called rotatory magnetism, and that most conductive bodies could be magnetized; these discoveries were completed and explained by Michael Faraday (1791–1867).

In 1834, Emil Lenz stated Lenz's law, which says that the direction of induced current flow in an object will be such that its magnetic field will oppose the change of magnetic flux that caused the current flow. Eddy currents produce a secondary field that cancels a part of the external field and causes some of the external flux to avoid the conductor.

French physicist Léon Foucault (1819–1868) is credited with having discovered eddy currents. In September 1855, he discovered that the force required for the rotation of a copper disc becomes greater when it is made to rotate with its rim between the poles of a magnet, the disc at the same time becoming heated by the eddy current induced in the metal. The first use of eddy current for non-destructive testing occurred in 1879 when David E. Hughes used the principles to conduct metallurgical sorting tests.

== Theory ==
Eddy currents (I, red) induced in a conductive metal plate (C) as it moves to the right under a magnet (N). The magnetic field (B, green) is directed down through the plate. The Lorentz force of the magnetic field on the electrons in the metal induces a sideways current under the magnet. The magnetic field, acting on the sideways moving electrons, creates a Lorentz force opposite to the velocity of the sheet, which acts as a drag force on the sheet. The blue arrows are counter magnetic fields generated by the circular motion of the charges.

Forces on an electron in the metal sheet under the magnet, explaining where the drag force on the sheet comes from. The red dot e_{1} shows a conduction electron in the sheet right after it has undergone a collision with an atom, and e_{2} shows the same electron after it has been accelerated by the magnetic field. On average at e_{1} the electron has the same velocity as the sheet (v, black arrow) in the +x direction. The magnetic field (B, green arrow) of the magnet's North pole N is directed down in the −y direction. The magnetic field exerts a Lorentz force on the electron (pink arrow) of F_{1} = −e(v × B), where e is the electron's charge. Since the electron has a negative charge, from the right hand rule this is directed in the +z direction. At e_{2} this force gives the electron a component of velocity in the sideways direction (v_{2}, black arrow) The magnetic field acting on this sideways velocity, then exerts a Lorentz force on the particle of F_{2} = −e(v_{2} × B). From the right hand rule, this is directed in the −x direction, opposite to the velocity v of the metal sheet. This force accelerates the electron giving it a component of velocity opposite to the sheet. Collisions of these electrons with the atoms of the sheet exert a drag force on the sheet.

Eddy current brake. The North magnetic pole piece (top) in this drawing is shown further away from the disk than the South; this is just to leave room to show the currents. In an actual eddy current brake the pole pieces are positioned as close to the disk as possible.

A magnet induces circular electric currents in a metal sheet moving through its magnetic field. The accompanying diagram shows a metal sheet $C$ moving to the right with velocity $\vec{v}$ under a stationary magnet. The magnetic field $\vec{B}$ (in green arrows) from the magnet's north pole $N$ passes down through the metal sheet.

Since the metal is moving, the magnetic flux through a given area of the sheet is changing. In particular, the part of the sheet moving toward the edge of the magnet (the left side) experiences an increase in magnetic flux density $\frac{dB}{dt}>0$. This change in magnetic flux, in turn, induces a circular electromotive force (emf) in the sheet, in accordance with Faraday's law of induction, exerting a force on the electrons in the sheet, causing a counterclockwise circular current $I$ in the sheet. This is an eddy current. Similarly, the part of the sheet moving away from the edge of the magnet (the right side) experiences a decrease in magnetic flux density $\frac{dB}{dt}<0$, inducing a second eddy current, this time in a clockwise direction. Since the electrons have a negative charge, they move in the opposite direction to the conventional current shown by the arrows.

Another equivalent way to understand the origin of eddy currents is to see that the free charge carriers (electrons) in the metal sheet are moving with the sheet to the right, so the magnetic field $\vec{B}$ exerts a sideways Lorentz force on them given by $\vec{F}=q\vec{v}\times\vec{B}$. Since the charge $q$ of the electrons is negative, by the right-hand rule the force is to the right, looking in the direction of motion of the sheet. So there is a flow of electrons toward the viewer under the magnet. This divides into two parts, flowing right and left around the magnet outside the magnetic field back to the far side of the magnet in two circular eddies. Since the electrons have a negative charge, the direction of conventional current arrows $I$ shown is in the opposite direction, toward the left under the magnet.

The electrons collide with the metal lattice atoms, exerting a drag force on the sheet proportional to its velocity. The kinetic energy used to overcome this drag is dissipated as heat by the currents flowing through the metal, so the metal gets warm under the magnet. As described by Ampère's circuital law, each of the circular currents in the sheet induces its own magnetic field (marked in blue arrows in the diagram).

Another way to understand the drag is to observe that in accordance with Lenz's law, the induced electromotive force must oppose the change in magnetic flux through the sheet. At the leading edge of the magnet (left side), the anti-clockwise current creates a magnetic field pointing up (as can be shown using the right hand rule), opposing the magnet's field. This causes a repulsive force to develop between the sheet and the leading edge of the magnet. In contrast, at the trailing edge (right side), the clockwise current causes a magnetic field pointed down, in the same direction as the magnet's field, resulting in an attractive force between the sheet and the trailing edge of the magnet. In both cases, the resulting force is not in the direction of motion of the sheet.

== Properties ==
Eddy currents in conductors of non-zero resistivity generate heat as well as electromagnetic forces. The heat can be used for induction heating. The electromagnetic forces can be used for levitation, creating movement, or to give a strong braking effect. Eddy currents can also have undesirable effects, for instance power loss in transformers. In this application, they are minimized with thin plates, by lamination of conductors or other details of conductor shape.

Self-induced eddy currents are responsible for the skin effect in conductors. The latter can be used for non-destructive testing of materials for geometry features, like micro-cracks. A similar effect is the proximity effect, which is caused by externally induced eddy currents.

An object or part of an object experiences steady field intensity and direction where there is still relative motion of the field and the object (for example in the center of the field in the diagram), or unsteady fields where the currents cannot circulate due to the geometry of the conductor. In these situations charges collect on or within the object and these charges then produce static electric potentials that oppose any further current. Currents may be initially associated with the creation of static potentials, but these may be transitory and small.

(left) Eddy currents (I, red) within a solid iron transformer core. (right) Making the core out of thin laminations parallel to the field (B, green) with insulation (C) between them reduces the eddy currents. Although the field and currents are shown in one direction, they actually reverse direction with the alternating current in the transformer winding.

Eddy currents generate resistive losses that transform some forms of energy, such as kinetic energy, into heat. This Joule heating reduces efficiency of iron-core transformers and electric motors and other devices that use changing magnetic fields. Eddy currents are minimized in these devices by selecting magnetic core materials that have low electrical conductivity (e.g., ferrites or iron powder mixed with resin) or by using thin sheets of magnetic material, known as laminations. Electrons cannot cross the insulating gap between the laminations and so are unable to circulate on wide arcs. Charges gather at the lamination boundaries, in a process analogous to the Hall effect, producing electric fields that oppose any further accumulation of charge and hence suppressing the eddy currents. The shorter the distance between adjacent laminations (i.e., the greater the number of laminations per unit area, perpendicular to the applied field), the greater the suppression of eddy currents.

The conversion of input energy to heat is not always undesirable, however, as there are some practical applications. One is in the brakes of some trains known as eddy current brakes. During braking, the metal wheels are exposed to a magnetic field from an electromagnet, generating eddy currents in the wheels. This eddy current is formed by the movement of the wheels. So, by Lenz's law, the magnetic field formed by the eddy current will oppose its cause. Thus the wheel will face a force opposing the initial movement of the wheel. The faster the wheels are spinning, the stronger the effect, meaning that as the train slows the braking force is reduced, producing a smooth stopping motion.

Induction heating makes use of eddy currents to provide heating of metal objects.

=== Power dissipation of eddy currents ===
Under certain assumptions (uniform material, uniform magnetic field, no skin effect, etc.) the power lost due to eddy currents per unit mass for a thin sheet or wire can be calculated from the following equation:
$$P = \frac{\pi^2 {B_\text{p}}^2 d^2 f^2 }{6k \rho D},$$
where

- P is the power lost per unit mass (W/kg),
- B_{p} is the peak magnetic field (T),
- d is the thickness of the sheet or diameter of the wire (m),
- f is the frequency (Hz),
- k is a constant equal to 1 for a thin sheet and 2 for a thin wire,
- ρ is the resistivity of the material (Ω m), and
- D is the density of the material (kg/m^{3}).

This equation is valid only under the so-called quasi-static conditions, where the frequency of magnetisation does not result in the skin effect; that is, the electromagnetic wave fully penetrates the material.

=== Skin effect ===
In very fast-changing fields, the magnetic field does not penetrate completely into the interior of the material. This skin effect renders the above equation invalid. However, in any case increased frequency of the same value of field will always increase eddy currents, even with non-uniform field penetration.

The penetration depth for a good conductor can be calculated from the following equation:
$$\delta = \frac{1}\sqrt{\pi f \mu \sigma},$$
where δ is the penetration depth (m), f is the frequency (Hz), μ is the magnetic permeability of the material (H/m), and σ is the electrical conductivity of the material (S/m).

=== Diffusion equation ===
The derivation of a useful equation for modelling the effect of eddy currents in a material starts with the differential, magnetostatic form of Ampère's Law, providing an expression for the magnetizing field H surrounding a current density J:
$$\nabla \times \mathbf{H} = \mathbf{J}.$$

Taking the curl on both sides of this equation and then using a common vector calculus identity for the curl of the curl results in
$$\nabla \left( \nabla \cdot \mathbf{H} \right) - \nabla^2\mathbf{H} = \nabla \times \mathbf{J}.$$

From Gauss's law for magnetism, ∇ ⋅ H = 0, so
$$-\nabla^2\mathbf{H}=\nabla\times\mathbf{J}.$$

Using Ohm's law, J = σE, which relates current density J to electric field E in terms of a material's conductivity σ, and assuming isotropic homogeneous conductivity, the equation can be written as
$$-\nabla^2\mathbf{H}=\sigma\nabla\times\mathbf{E}.$$

Using the differential form of Faraday's law, ∇ × E = −∂B/∂t, this gives
$$\nabla^2\mathbf{H} = \sigma \frac{\partial \mathbf{B}}{\partial t}.$$

By definition, B = μ_{0}(H + M), where M is the magnetization of the material and μ_{0} is the vacuum permeability. The diffusion equation therefore is
$$\nabla^2\mathbf{H} = \mu_0 \sigma \left( \frac{\partial \mathbf{M} }{\partial t} + \frac{\partial \mathbf{H}}{\partial t} \right).$$

== Applications ==
=== Electromagnetic braking ===
Demonstration of Waltenhofen's pendulum, precursor of eddy current brakes. The formation and suppression of eddy currents is here demonstrated by means of this pendulum, a metal plate oscillating between the pole pieces of a strong electromagnet. As soon as a sufficiently strong magnetic field has been switched on, the pendulum is stopped on entering the field.

Eddy current brakes use the drag force created by eddy currents as a brake to slow or stop moving objects. Since there is no contact with a brake shoe or drum, there is no mechanical wear. However, an eddy current brake cannot provide a "holding" torque and so may be used in combination with mechanical brakes, for example, on overhead cranes. Another application is on some roller coasters, where heavy copper plates extending from the car are moved between pairs of very strong permanent magnets. Electrical resistance within the plates causes a dragging effect analogous to friction, which dissipates the kinetic energy of the car. The same technique is used in electromagnetic brakes in railroad cars and to quickly stop the blades in power tools such as circular saws. Using electromagnets, as opposed to permanent magnets, the strength of the magnetic field can be adjusted and so the magnitude of braking effect changed.

=== Repulsive effects and levitation ===
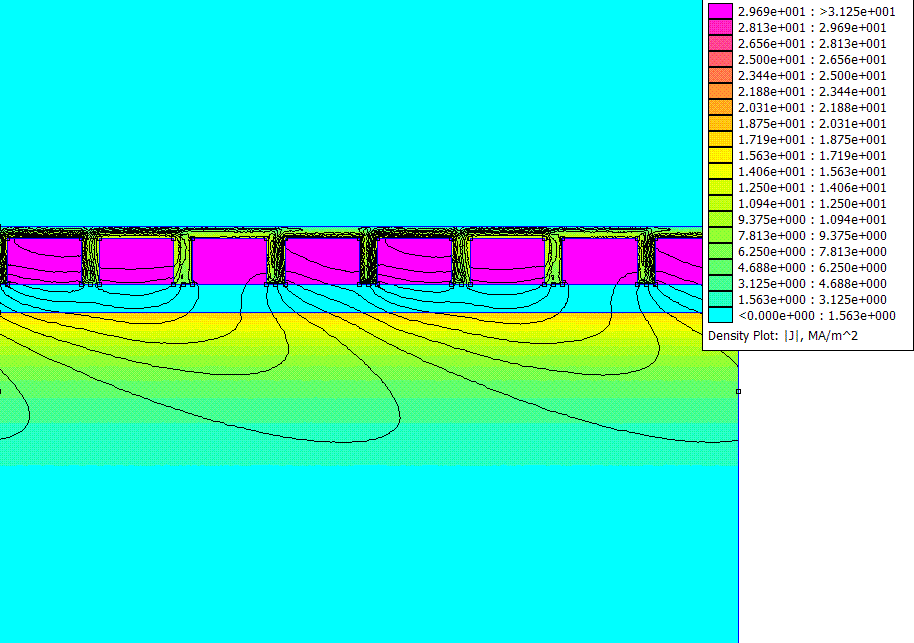
A cross section through a linear motor placed above a thick aluminium slab. As the linear induction motor's field pattern sweeps to the left, eddy currents are left behind in the metal and this causes the field lines to lean.

In a varying magnetic field, the induced currents exhibit diamagnetic-like repulsion effects. A conductive object will experience a repulsion force. This can lift objects against gravity, though with continual power input to replace the energy dissipated by the eddy currents. An example application is separation of aluminum cans from other metals in an eddy current separator. Ferrous metals cling to the magnet, and aluminum (and other non-ferrous conductors) are forced away from the magnet; this can separate a waste stream into ferrous and non-ferrous scrap metal.

With a very strong handheld magnet, such as those made from neodymium, one can easily observe a very similar effect by rapidly sweeping the magnet over a coin with only a small separation. Depending on the strength of the magnet, identity of the coin, and separation between the magnet and coin, one may induce the coin to be pushed slightly ahead of the magnet – even if the coin contains no magnetic elements, such as the US penny. Another example involves dropping a strong magnet down a tube of copper – the magnet falls at a dramatically slow pace.

In a perfect conductor with no resistance, surface eddy currents exactly cancel the field inside the conductor, so no magnetic field penetrates the conductor. Since no energy is lost in resistance, eddy currents created when a magnet is brought near the conductor persist even after the magnet is stationary, and can exactly balance the force of gravity, allowing magnetic levitation. Superconductors also exhibit a separate inherently quantum mechanical phenomenon called the Meissner effect in which any magnetic field lines present in the material when it becomes superconducting are expelled, thus the magnetic field in a superconductor is always zero.

Using electromagnets with electronic switching comparable to electronic speed control it is possible to generate electromagnetic fields moving in an arbitrary direction. As described in the section above about eddy current brakes, a non-ferromagnetic conductor surface tends to rest within this moving field. When however this field is moving, a vehicle can be levitated and propelled. This is comparable to a maglev but is not bound to a rail.

=== Identification of metals ===
In some coin-operated vending machines, eddy currents are used to detect counterfeit coins, or slugs. The coin rolls past a stationary magnet, and eddy currents slow its speed. The strength of the eddy currents, and thus the retardation, depends on the conductivity of the coin's metal. Slugs are slowed to a different degree than genuine coins, and this is used to send them into the rejection slot.

=== Vibration and position sensing ===
Eddy currents are used in certain types of proximity sensors to observe the vibration and position of rotating shafts within their bearings. This technology was originally pioneered in the 1930s by researchers at General Electric using vacuum tube circuitry. In the late 1950s, solid-state versions were developed by Donald E. Bently at Bently Nevada Corporation. These sensors are extremely sensitive to very small displacements making them well suited to observe the minute vibrations (on the order of a tenth of a millimeter, or several thousandths of an inch) in modern turbomachinery. A typical proximity sensor used for vibration monitoring has a scale factor of 7900 mV/mm (200 mV/mil). Widespread use of such sensors in turbomachinery has led to development of industry standards that prescribe their use and application. Examples of such standards are American Petroleum Institute (API) Standard 670 and ISO 7919.

A Ferraris acceleration sensor, also called a Ferraris sensor, is a contactless sensor that uses eddy currents to measure relative acceleration.

=== Structural testing ===
Eddy current techniques are commonly used for the nondestructive examination (NDE) and condition monitoring of a large variety of metallic structures, including heat exchanger tubes, aircraft fuselage, and aircraft structural components.

=== Skin effects ===
Eddy currents are the root cause of the skin effect in conductors carrying alternating current.

Lamination of magnetic cores in transformers greatly improves the efficiency by minimising eddy currents

Similarly, in magnetic materials of finite conductivity, eddy currents cause the confinement of the majority of the magnetic fields to only a couple skin depths of the surface of the material. This effect limits the flux linkage in inductors and transformers having magnetic cores.

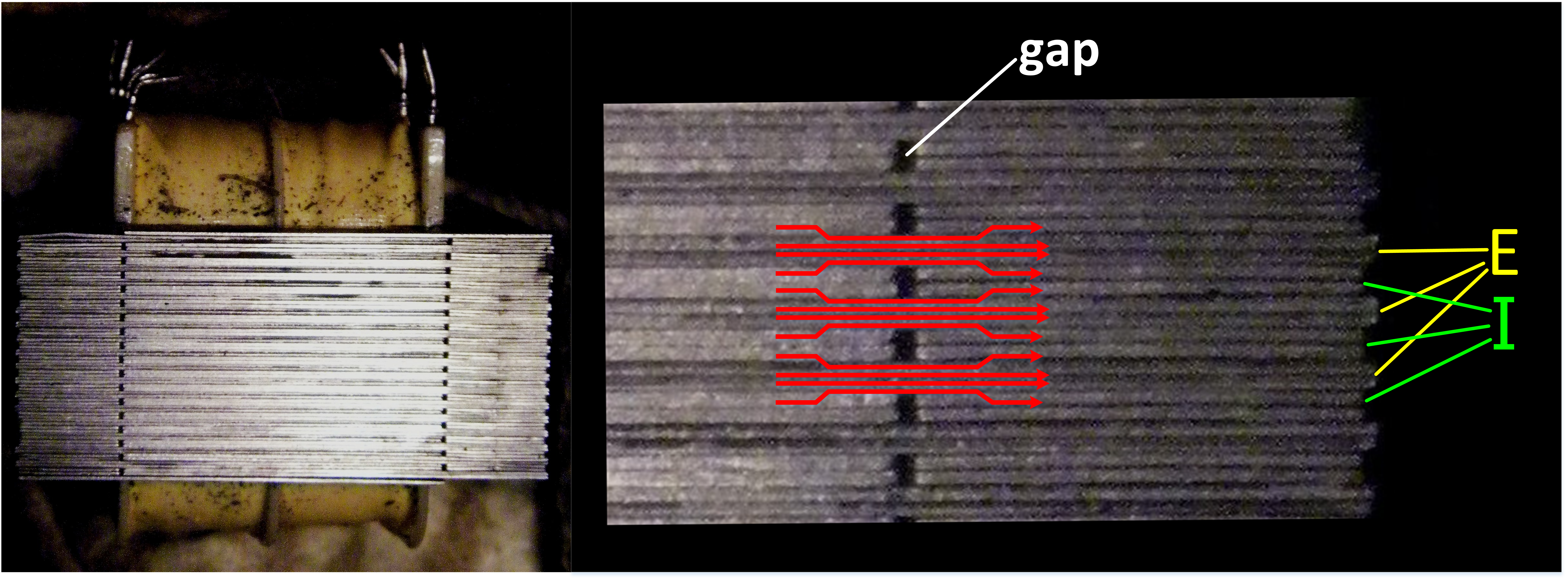
E-I transformer laminations showing flux paths. The effect of the gap where the laminations are butted together can be mitigated by alternating pairs of E laminations with pairs of I laminations, providing a path for the magnetic flux around the gap.

=== Other applications ===
- Rock climbing auto belays
- Zip line brakes
- Free fall devices
- Metal detectors
- Conductivity meters for non-magnetic metals
- Eddy current adjustable-speed drives
- Eddy-current testing
- Eddy current brake
- Electricity meters (electromechanical induction meters)
- Induction heating
- Cooking (induction cooking)
- Proximity sensor (displacement sensors)
- Vending machines (detection of coins)
- Coating thickness measurements
- Sheet resistance measurement
- Eddy current separator for metal separation
- Mechanical speedometers
- Safety hazard and defect detection applications
- Magnetic damping
