= Ester F. Bentley =

American social worker (1915–2004)

- Born: Ester Frances Bentley; October 24, 1915; Louisville, Kentucky, U.S.
- Died: January 20, 2004 (age 88); Los Angeles, California, U.S.
- Occupations: Social worker, community organizer, activist

Ester Frances Bentley (October 24, 1915 – January 20, 2004) was an American social worker and community organizer, based in Southern California. Her papers are part of the June L. Mazer Lesbian Archives at UCLA.

== Early life and education ==
Bentley was born in Louisville, Kentucky, the daughter of Charles Arthur Bentley and Minnie (or Winnie) Bentley, and granddaughter of Emma Frances Foster, with whom she lived. In 1941 she graduated from Catherine Spalding College with a degree in education, and she earned a master's degree in social work (MSW) at Catholic University of America in 1949, with a thesis on child welfare services in Kentucky.

== Career ==
Bentley was president of the Municipal Hockey League in Louisville in 1942. She worked for the USO during and after World War II. She was director of field services of the Kentucky Society for Crippled Children in Harlan County in 1950. In 1954 she worked for United Community Defense Services in Key West, Florida, consulting on community planning and agency development. She was a national field consultant for the National Catholic Community Service, at the agency's headquarters in Washington, D.C.

Bentley moved to Southern California by 1958. She was a caseworker at Metropolitan State Hospital in Norwalk, and editor of the Directory of Health, Welfare, and Recreational Services. She was executive director of the Girl Scout Council in Santa Ana. She supervised students and taught in the UCLA School of Social Welfare from 1966 to 1974. She worked in the regional center system in Orange County before she retired. In 1982, she received the Caritas Medal from her alma mater, Spalding University.

Bentley was active in LGBTQ and Catholic organizations, including Old Lesbians Organizing for Change, Uptown Gay & Lesbian Alliance, and Woman Against Violence Against Women. She served on an advisory committee at the Los Angeles Gay & Lesbian Center. In her late years, she was one of the founding members of the Coalition of Older Lesbians (COOL).

== Personal life ==
Bentley died in 2004, at the age of 88, in Los Angeles. Her papers constitute one of the largest collections in the June L. Mazer Lesbian Archives at UCLA. One of the unusual artifacts in the collection is a folding screen room divider, decorated by Bentley with hundreds of photos of her friends, colleagues, and lovers, many of them labeled with their first names; Bentley added the title "Celebrating the Women in My Life" to the top edge of the screen.
