= Susan L. Mizruchi =

Professor of English literature (born 1959)

Susan Laura Mizruchi (July 13, 1959) is professor of English literature and the William Arrowsmith Professor in the Humanities at Boston University. Her research interests include nineteenth- and twentieth-century American literature, religion and culture, literary and social theory, literary history, history of the social sciences, and American and Global Film and TV. Since 2016, she has served as the director of the Boston University Center for the Humanities.

== Education and academic career ==
Mizruchi received her B.A. in English and in history from Washington University in St. Louis in 1981 and her Ph.D. from Princeton University in 1985. In 1986 she joined Boston University as an assistant professor of English. She was promoted to associate professor in 1992 and full professor in 1998. In 2017 she was named the inaugural William Arrowsmith Professor in the Humanities.

Among her honors and grants, Mizruchi has been awarded fellowships from the Guggenheim Foundation, the National Endowment for the Humanities, and the Fulbright Commission.

Since 2016 Mizruchi has served as the director of the Boston University Center for the Humanities (BUCH). Under her directorship, BUCH has hosted forums on “Libraries and Archives in the Digital Age” (2017), “Humanities Approaches to the Opioid Crisis” (2018), and “Can We Talk: Dialogue and Debate in the Contemporary Academy” (2019).

In 2020, the Teagle Foundation awarded BUCH a grant to develop "The One & the Many at BU," a summer residential humanities program for Boston-area high school students.

== Writing and academic work ==
Mizruchi's short story "Like a Rose Rabbi" appeared in the Winter 1983 issue of the Kansas Quarterly (now the Arkansas Review).

Mizruchi’s first book, The Power of Historical Knowledge: Narrating the Past in Hawthorne, James, and Dreiser (Princeton UP, 1988), examines acts of historical narration in American literature. The book includes readings of Nathaniel Hawthorne's The House of the Seven Gables (1851), Henry James' The Wings of the Dove (1902), and Theodore Dreiser's An American Tragedy (1925). Writing in the New England Quarterly, Amy Kaplan praised Mizruchi for "persuasively discovers[ing] the pressure of history everywhere, and ... acutely gaug[ing] its impact on precisely those texts that seem to float freely above historical contingency."

Mizruchi's second book, The Science of Sacrifice: American Literature and Modern Social Theory (Princeton UP, 1998), looks at sacrifice in American literature and social theory of the late 19th and early 20th centuries. The book coordinates the rise of the field of sociology with literary representations of sacrifice, reading the social theory of Émile Durkheim and W. E. B. Du Bois alongside the fiction of Herman Melville and Henry James. A feature on the book appeared in the Chronicle of Higher Education, noting Mizruchi's standing at the forefront of "a growing number of scholars who approach religion in American life through interdisciplinary study." Nan Goodman's review in American Literature highlighted Mizruchi's treatment of literary realism, commending "Mizruchi's recognition that realism interacted with others theories of social order – the new disciplines of sociology and psychology, for example – [as] one of the many things that makes her book so significant." In a review for the American Journal of Sociology, Alan Sica praised the book's "innovative and thickly constructed interdisciplinary writing," labeling it "excellent social theory."

In 2005, Mizruchi’s "Becoming Multicultural: Culture Economy, and the Novel, 1860-1920" appeared in The Cambridge History of American Literature: Vol. 3, Prose Writing, 1860–1920 (Cambridge UP). The other contributions to that volume are Richard H. Brodhead's "The American Literary Field, 1860–1890"; Nancy Bentley's "Literary Forms and Mass Culture, 1870–1920"; and Walter Benn Michaels' "Promises of American Life, 1880–1920." Edited by Sacvan Bercovitch, the eight volumes of The Cambridge History of American Literature cover poetry, prose writing, and criticism from 1590 to the end of the twentieth century. In a review in the Journal of American Studies, Richard Gray called The Cambridge History of American Literature "without doubt and without any serious rival, the scholarly history for our generation."

The Rise of Multicultural America: Economy and Print Culture, 1865–1915 (University of North Carolina Press), a revised and expanded version of "Becoming Multicultural," came out in 2008. Examining literature, photography, and advertisements produced in the half-century after the American Civil War, Mizruchi's book argues that rapid corporate capitalist development and high immigration rates fostered the idea of multiculturalism. Mizruchi's book covers an eclectic range of print culture, including the Civil War photography of Alexander Gardner; Albion W. Tourgée's Reconstruction-era writings; the career and writings of the Santee Sioux physician Charles Eastman; the advertisements that framed the serialized publication of Jack London's The Call of the Wild (1903) in the Saturday Evening Post; and Charlotte Perkins Gilman's feminist-utopian novel Herland (1915).

In 2014, Mizruchi published a biography of Marlon Brando, Brando’s Smile: His Life, Thought, and Work (Norton). The book is based on Mizruchi’s extensive research in Brando’s private archives, which she spent years tracking down after many of Brando’s belongings were auctioned off following his death in 2004. Drawing on Brando’s personal film scripts, Mizruchi presents him as a scrupulous actor who often edited and improved his own lines, including some of his most iconic lines in On the Waterfront and The Godfather. Furthermore, Mizruchi views the 4,000 books that made up Brando’s personal library as evidence of his intellectual curiosity and informed commitment to the civil rights movement.

Brando’s Smile garnered considerable attention in the mainstream press. David Kirby's review in the Washington Post praised the book as a "smooth-reading and informative portrait." Writing in the Wall Street Journal, Scott Eyman described the book as "an 'intellectual biography' of man who wasn't an intellectual in the conventional sense." Antonia Quirke of the Financial Times called Brando's Smile an "always interesting, addictive book," with the publication later naming it one of its Best Books of 2014. Additionally, the book received a starred review in Booklist and coverage in the New York Times the New York Review of Books.

In August 2021, Mizruchi appeared on a podcast, Since the World's been Turning, to discuss Brando and his legacy.

Mizruchi’s Henry James: A Very Short Introduction was published by Oxford University Press in June 2021. Publishers Weekly has praised the book's "swift, efficient approach to James’s oeuvre [as] perfect for students and general readers." In a piece for The Millions, Mizruchi listed her top ten Henry James works, ranking The Portrait of a Lady (1881) number one.

Mizruchi has edited two academic volumes. The first, Religion and Cultural Studies (Princeton UP, 2001), collects essays premised on the observation that "religion [is] a significant and under-studied instance of the 'multicultural.'" The second, Libraries and Archives in the Digital Age (Palgrave Macmillan, 2020), brings together essays that address the evolving roles of librarians and archivists. Contributors to the collection include former director of the Harvard University Library Robert Darnton and the Argentine-Canadian writer Alberto Manguel, a former director of the National Library of Argentina.

== Awards, fellowships, grants, and lectures ==
- Annual Vardi Memorial Lecture, Tel Aviv University, 2019
- William Arrowsmith Endowed Chair in Humanities, Boston University, 2017–
- Fulbright Award, Brazil, 2015
- Arts and Sciences Dean’s Award for Excellence in Graduate Education, Boston University, 2015
- Senior Research Fellowship, Boston University Humanities Foundation, 2008–09
- Raymond Schwager Memorial Lecturer, Notre Dame University, 2010
- Certificates of Appreciation, Boston University Class of 2007, 2008 Teacher Honoree
- Distinguished Teaching Award, Boston University Honors Program, 2001
- Selection Committee for the John D. and Catherine T. MacArthur Foundation, 2001
- John Simon Guggenheim Memorial Foundation Fellowship, 2001–02
- Radcliffe Institute For Advanced Study, Senior Fellowship, 2001 (declined)
- American Council of Learned Societies, Senior Fellowship, 2001 (declined)
- Fulbright Visiting Professorship at Tel Aviv University, June, 1996 (declined)
- Fletcher S. Jones Fellowship, The Huntington Library, 1995
- Howard S. Eckles Fellowship, University of Utah Humanities Center, 1994–95 (declined)
- Research Affiliate, Woodrow Wilson Center, Smithsonian (1990–91)
- National Endowment for the Humanities Research Fellowship for University Teachers (1990–91)
- Junior Research Fellowship, Boston University Humanities Foundation, 1988–89
- Harold S. Dodds Dissertation Fellowship, Princeton University, 1984-85
- Princeton University Graduate Fellowship, 1981–83
- Award for Fiction, Kansas Quarterly Prizes, 1983

== Professional activity ==
- Reviewer, John Simon Guggenheim Memorial Foundation, 2021
- Advisory Board of Museum of Fine Arts, 2018
- Board Member of The Boston Public Library’s Anti-Slavery Collection, 2017–
- National Humanities Association, Conference Planning Committee, 2016–
- Advisory Board of The History Makers, 2016-
- U.S. Delegate for Literature, Film, and Media Studies, Oxford University Press, 2016–
- U.S. Delegate for Literature, Oxford University Press, 2011–16
- Advisory Council, Princeton University English Dept., 2013–
- Consultant, PBS, American Masters documentaries, 2014–
- Consultant, Canadian Government, Concordia University, English Ph.D. Program, 2014
- Tenure Review Committees: University of Notre Dame, 2014; Harvard University, 2009; University of Michigan, 2009; University of Pennsylvania, 2007; University of Kentucky, 2004
- Reviewer, Hong Kong Institute of Education, 2013, 2014, 2015
- Reviewer for American Council of Learned Societies, Fellowships, 2011, 2012, 2013
- Reader for Oxford University Press, Harvard University Press, Duke University Press, University of Chicago Press, Princeton University Press, Ohio State University Press, PMLA, Early American Literature, Modern Fiction Studies, American Quarterly, American Literary History, History of the Human Sciences.
- Consultant, National Endowment for the Humanities, 1990–95, 2000–06
- Selection Committee for the Radcliffe Institute for Advanced Study, 2002–03
- Faculty of the Teachers as Scholars Program, Harvard Graduate School of Education, 1999–2005, 2010–11, 2014–
- Modern Language Association Committee on Prize for Best First Book, 1991
- Panelist/Reviewer, National Endowment for the Humanities, Fellowships for University Teacher, 1989

== Personal life ==
Mizruchi's father Ephraim was a sociologist who taught at Syracuse University. He was the author of notable works of sociology including Success and Opportunity: A Study of Anomie (1964), The Substance of Sociology: Codes, Conduct, and Consequences (1967), and Regulating Society: Marginality and Social Control in Historical Perspective (1983). Her mother Ruth was a lecturer in literature and composition at Syracuse University and Le Moyne College. She has two brothers, David and Mark.

Mizruchi was married to the literary and cultural critic Sacvan Bercovitch until his death in 2014, with whom she had a son, Alexander Philip Bercovitch ("Sascha") born in 1992.

== Bibliography ==
=== As writer ===
- The Power of Historical Knowledge: Narrating the Past in Hawthorne, James, and Dreiser (Princeton UP, 1988)
- The Science of Sacrifice: American Literature and Modern Social Theory (Princeton UP, 1998)
- Becoming Multicultural: Culture, Economy, and the Novel, 1860–1920 (Cambridge UP, 2005)
- The Rise of Multicultural America (North Carolina UP, 2008)
- Brando’s Smile: His Life, Thought, and Work (Norton, 2014)
- Henry James: A Very Short Introduction (Oxford UP, 2021)

=== As editor ===
- Religion and Cultural Studies (Princeton UP, 2001)
- Libraries and Archives in the Digital Age (Palgrave Macmillan, 2020)

=== Selected articles and chapters/sections of books ===
- “Cataloging the Creatures of the Deep: Billy Budd and the Rise of Sociology,” Revisionary Interventions into the Americanist Canon (1994) and Boundary 2 (1990)
- “Neighbors, Strangers, Corpses: Death and Sympathy in the Early Writings of W.E.B. Du Bois,” Centuries’ Ends, Narrative Means (1996) and The Norton Critical Edition of The Souls of Black Folk (1999)
- “Lolita in History,” American Literature (2003)
- “Becoming Multicultural: Culture, Economy, and the Novel, 1860–1920,” in Cambridge History of American Lit. vol. 3: Prose Writing, 1860–1920 (Cambridge: Cambridge University Press, 2005)
- “Risk Theory and the Contemporary American Novel,” American Literary History (2009)
- “The School of Martyrdom: Culture and Class in The Catcher in the Rye” Religion and Literature (Summer 2015), pp. 23–40.
