= Donald E. Bently =

American entrepreneur, engineer and philanthropist (1924-2012)

- Donald Emory Bently
- Born: Donald Emory Bently; October 18, 1924; Cleveland, Ohio, US
- Died: October 1, 2012 (aged 87); Carson Valley, Nevada, US
- Resting place: Greenwood Cemetery, Muscatine, Iowa
- Occupations: Engineer, inventor, businessman, philanthropist
- Known for: Inventor of eddy current proximity transducer Founder of Bently Nevada
- Spouses: Verna Francis Holt (after 1948) Susan Lorraine Pumphrey (m. 1962–1981)
- Children: 1

Donald E. Bently (October 18, 1924 – October 1, 2012) was a globally recognized authority on rotor dynamics and vibration monitoring and diagnostics, and an American entrepreneur, engineer, and philanthropist. He founded Bently Nevada Corporation in October, 1961, where he performed pioneering work in the field of instrumentation for measuring the mechanical condition of rotating machinery. He designed the first commercially successful eddy current proximity transducer. It became the de facto standard when the American Petroleum Institute adopted the proximity probe as the device for measuring acceptable shaft vibration during factory acceptance testing of centrifugal compressors.

He was the company's president and later CEO until it attained $250 million in annual sales, when he sold it in February, 2002 to GE Energy. In 2017 GE merged it into Baker Hughes. The company continues to design, manufacture, and market vibration monitoring and diagnostic products and services as a subsidiary of the Baker Hughes Company. Following the sale of Bently Nevada, Bently remained active in his other family-owned businesses representing a diverse range of interests including rotordynamics, agriculture, biofuels, real estate, externally pressurized fluid bearings, and machinery diagnostics.

== Personal life ==
Bently was born in Cleveland, Ohio, to Oliver and Mary Evelyn Bently. He had an older brother Oliver and a younger sister Alice. His great-grandfather Benjamin Nye, one of Muscatine County's first settlers, built the Pine Creek Gristmill in 1848. It is now a historic landmark in Wildcat Den State Park near Muscatine. Bently's father Oliver was a veteran of World War I and a farmer. Oliver bought a bowling alley when Don was 14, and Don learned to set pins. He graduated from high school in Muscatine and was drafted into the U.S. Navy during World War II. He served with the 141st Naval Construction Battalion (NCB) as a Seabee from August 1943 to April 1946. His brother Oliver served in the U.S. Army Air Force in the troop carrier command from 1943 to 1946.

The 141st NCB was stationed at Hilo, Hawaii. It earned battle stars for service in Luzon, Leyte, Saipan, and Tinian. Bently made four major amphibious landings during the war. In June, 1945, all of the Battalion's units but Bently's company were detached for service on Samar island in the Philippines. His company of 224 men was instead ordered to Kwajalein Atoll, Marshall Islands, where it arrived on May 24. The unit (known as ACORN: for Aviation, Construction, Ordnance, Repair) constructed a major aviation facility on Kwajalein Atoll. The facilities were later used as a command center to prepare for Operation Crossroads. In his free time, Bently began taking extension courses from the University of Iowa. His officer told him not to bother: "You'll probably be dead within the year anyway." The unit was preparing for the invasion of Japan when the Japanese surrendered on August 15, 1945. The 141st NCB was inactivated on January 2, 1946.

He returned to Muscatine and attended the University of Iowa. While a student, he married Verna Francis Holt on July 3, 1948, in Muscatine. Upon graduation in 1949, he received a Bachelor of Science degree in Electrical Engineering, after which he earned a master's degree in Electrical Engineering in 1950. Bently worked as the lead azide and mercury fulminate assembly line primary detonator engineer at the Iowa Ordnance Plant in Burlington, Iowa.

In 1950, he moved to California. He worked at the Rocketdyne division of North American Aviation in California for three years during which he did graduate-level coursework at UC Berkeley and UCLA. At Rocketdyne he learned about electronic sensing technologies for aircraft control systems. He thought the technology had commercial applications in other fields and received permission to use it in his own endeavors. In 1956 Don left Rocketdyne and began experimenting with eddy-current sensing technology and formed Bently Scientific Company. He manufactured and sold eddy-current products via mail-order out of his garage in Berkeley, California.

In 1960 he bought land in Douglas County, Nevada. In 1961, Bently relocated his company to Minden, Nevada, and incorporated it as Bently Nevada Corporation with three people. A year after relocating to Nevada, he married Susan Lorraine Pumphrey on October 5, 1962. They adopted a son Christopher and were divorced in 1981. Bently died on October 1, 2012, at his home in Carson Valley, Nevada. He was 87.

== Founder of Bently Nevada ==
Bently began selling instrumentation from his garage via mail order in 1955. He organized his first business as Bently Scientific Company in Berkeley, California, in 1956. He moved the company to Minden, Nevada in 1961 and incorporated it as Bently Nevada Corporation with three employees. In 1958, a team from Pepperl+Fuchs had invented an inductive eddy-current sensor as a replacement for a mechanical switch. But Bently's company was the first to successfully commercialize eddy-current proximity transducers, non-contacting displacement sensors measure vibration in high-speed turbomachinery. This type of electronic sensor is typically used to measure very small distances between the tip of the sensor and a conductive surface, such as rotating shaft. The displacements measured are extremely small, typically only several thousandths of an inch. Bently's application of eddy-current sensor technology was the foundation of an entire industry. Bently could be extremely demanding. He had high standards and did not compromise. He wrote, "Early in my career I decided that I would be absolutely true to my principles. This stand has led me occasionally to lose business, and sometimes lose employees. In the end, however, I have never regretted adhering as closely as I know how to a set of timeless principles. As I built my company, I demanded of my employees this same dedication to principle." One employee was his executive assistant for 17 years, but he was well known for dismissing assistants with whom he did not get along.

The eddy-current proximity probe pioneered by Bently became the de facto standard for the industry. In 1970 the American Petroleum Institute designated the proximity probe as the measurement device for measuring acceptable shaft vibration during factory acceptance testing. It added this as a requirement to its standard for turbomachinery acceptance testing and machinery protection. The eddy-current proximity probe became the preferred method for assessing vibration and overall mechanical condition on large turbomachinery employing fluid bearings.

Bently Nevada manufactures and sells asset protection and condition monitoring hardware, software and services for industrial plant-wide operations. Bently Nevada opened its first international office in 1969 in the Netherlands. It gained recognition as the leader in the field. The company grew substantially over the years until in 2002 it had 1,200 people at its headquarters in Minden, Nevada, 2,100 employees worldwide, 100 offices in more than 40 countries, and global sales exceeding US$235 million. In January 2002 at age 78 Don Bently sold the business to GE Energy for between $600 million and $900 million. Its products are used world-wide to monitor the mechanical condition of rotating equipment in a variety of industries including oil and gas production, hydroelectric, wind, hydrocarbon processing, electric power generation, pulp and paper, mining, water and wastewater treatment.

== Other business interests ==
Bently founded or owned a number of other businesses.

=== Bently Pressurized Bearing Company ===
The bearing company manufactured a bearing that can hold a rotating axle in place. The technology injected highly pressurized air between the bearing and the rotating machinery, preventing the axle from touching the bearing, virtually eliminating friction. Bently Pressurized Bearings was sold in 2014 to New Way Air Bearings.

=== Bently Rotordynamics ===
In 1981, Bently established a pure research organization called Bently Rotordynamics Research Corporation (BRDRC or "Birdrock"). BRDRC's objective was to conduct rotordynamic research, furthering the knowledge of rotating machinery behavior, modeling techniques, and malfunction diagnostic methodologies. Its mission was considered complementary to Bently Nevada, with BRDRC focused on understanding how machinery behaved, and Bently Nevada focused on understanding and building instrumentation to measure machinery behavior.

BRDRC made a number of important contributions to the field of rotordynamics such as a better understanding of fluid-induced instabilities, advanced models for understanding shaft crack behavior, insight into rubbing malfunctions between stationary and rotating parts, and enhancement of the rotordynamic equations via introduction of a new variable lambda (λ) which denoted the fluid circumferential average velocity ratio and more accurately modeled hydrodynamic effects. Bently was personally responsible for many of these developments, publishing his work under the auspices of BRDRC. BRDRC also introduced several new data presentation formats, such as so-called "full" spectrum plots and "acceptance region" trend plots. Its research findings were published extensively in relevant technical journals, and the research that had practical commercial applications often found its way into the Bently Nevada product line. In 2002, BRDRC was sold along with Bently Nevada to GE Energy.

He founded RoMaDyn, a mechanical engineering services and diagnostics company.

=== Bently Agrowdynamics ===
Bently founded Bently Agrowdynamics, which focused on environmentally sustainable agricultural practices with crop, cattle, and compost production. Over more than two decades, Bently bought more than 38,000 acres (15,000 ha) of agricultural land in and around Carson Valley, Nevada, part of the former Dangberg Ranch. He established Bently Ranch to raise beef cattle and alfalfa. Following his interest in sustainable energy, he began composting waste materials which he sold as soil amendments and premium compost blends. He built a bio-diesel plant in Minden and he sold the fuel beginning on September 30, 2008, through Bently Biofuels Outpost, a retail location in Minden. In 2018, they converted the store into Bently Ranch Butcher Shop, a retail outlet for their premium beef. The store was closed during the 2020 Covid Pandemic.

As president of Bently Agrowdynamics, Bently led reconstruction of Mud Lake Dam south of Gardnerville which had been damaged during the 1994 Double Springs Flat magnitude 6.0 earthquake. They replaced the 2,000 feet (610 m) long, 100-year-old earth-filled dam with a 950 feet (290 m) long rock-filled dam on a concrete foundation. The new dam was built slightly downstream of the original dam. It was completed in June 2000 at a cost of $7 million. The dam provides irrigation water to more than 1,000 acres (400 ha) of land that are part of Bently Agrowdynamics’ South Ranch. The new dam not only improved the dam's resistance to earthquakes but helped protect the nearby community.

=== Founded ISCORMA ===
A significant amount of Bently's rotordynamic research efforts were about rotor dynamic stability. In 2001, he established ISCORMA, (International Symposium on Stability Control of Rotating Machinery), a bi-annual industry event. Bently was an active organizer and participant in all ISCORMA conferences until his death.

=== Work with NASA ===
His expertise also led to work for NASA. He spent 2½ years studying the area where the oxygen and hydrogen fuel pumps connect to the main engines on the space shuttle following the January 1986 challenger disaster.

=== Other business interests ===
He organized Bently Tribology Services, which provided laboratory tests designed for bio-diesel producers, blenders, distributors and end users and laboratory services to analyze the condition of lubricants and hydraulic fluids.

He bought Gibson Tool and Supply in 1978 from Phil and Rose Gibson. The company provided cutting tools, abrasives, measuring instruments, carbide tooling, carbide inserts, machine tool accessories, tooling components, coolants, and measuring machines.

Bently bought a ten floor, 32,000 square feet (3,000 m^{2}) art-deco apartment building built in 1924 on the highest point of San Francisco's Nob Hill, which he renamed Bently Nob Hill. He also held numerous real estate holdings in the United States and abroad.

All of Bently's businesses were privately held, allowing him to focus on a long-term strategy without the pressure of quarterly stockholder reports. This also enabled him to keep his company in the front of his field technologically. He successfully competed against subsidized Japanese companies and from U.S. government-funded entities.

=== Subsequent sale ===
Upon Don Bently's death, his son Christopher took over his father's businesses. In 2022, Christopher Bently put all of his Bently holdings up for sale, including the 12,393 acres (5,015 ha) ranch for $100 million, and a distillery he converted from the former Minden Flour Mill in 2015-19 for $200 million.

He bought two adjacent properties on the Lake Tahoe waterfront for $20.9 million and $4.95 in 2013. In December 2021, the put them up for sale as a unit for $55 million. In July 2020, Christopher and his wife Camille Bently purchased the Kildrummy Estate near Alford, Aberdeenshire in Scotland for around $13.6 million. The 5,600 acres (2,300 ha) property includes an Edwardian mansion, several farms, and The Kildrummy Inn. The couple relocated to Scotland later that year.

In May 2023, Bill Foley, the owner of the NHL’s Vegas Golden Knights, bought the Minden distillery. The purchase included an American Whiskey and white spirits distillery in a 100-year-old creamery, and an American Single Malt Whiskey distillery housed in a 100-year-old flour mill. Both buildings are on the National Register of Historic Places.

== Philanthropy and public service ==
Bently was a leader of and major financial supporter of The Institute of World Politics, a graduate school in Washington, D.C., that offers education in statecraft, national security, intelligence, and international affairs. Bently purchased the Marlatt Mansion and two adjacent townhouses for the institute. For the first 15 years, he rented the building to the Institute for $1.00 per year. He paid several million dollars to gut and completely renovate townhouses next door and later donated them to the institute. He also endowed the Donald E. Bently Chair of Political Economy.

Bently donated several million dollars to Cal Poly State University in San Luis Obispo, California, which in Spring 2003 named the Donald E. Bently Center for Engineering Innovation to honor his substantial contributions. He supported local schools in Carson Valley, and gave generously to St. Gall Catholic Church, Carson Valley United Methodist Church, and a battered women's shelter. He donated land for the Western Nevada College campus in Minden, Nevada, which named the building in his honor.

He helped fund the building of the new 38,338 square feet (3,561.7 m^{2}) museum facility built in 2010 at the U.S. Navy Seabee Museum at Port Hueneme, California. In 2005, he helped create a conservation easement with the Nature Conservancy that preserved Kirman Field in northern Douglas County. He also supported the Friends of Pine Creek Gristmill in Muscatine, the Muscatine Junior College and its Alumni Association, Muscatine Community College, the Lucille A. Carver Mississippi River Environmental Research Station Fund, and the University of Iowa.

== Recognition ==
In 1995 he received the distinguished research award for achievements in the field of rotating machinery from the Pacific Center of Thermal Fluid Engineering. Bently was recognized with the American Society of Mechanical Engineers Frederick P. Smarro Award and the R. Tom Sawyer Award, and the N. O. Myklestad Award from the Technical Committee on Vibration and Sound of the ASME Design Engineering Division in 1997. He was a Fellow and Life Member of the American Society of Mechanical Engineers. In 1992, he was made a foreign member of the St. Petersburg Academy of Engineering in Russia. The Board of Regents of the university and Community College System of Nevada recognized Bently as a 2002 Distinguished Nevadan. Bently was named as Nevada's outstanding inventor in 1983. He was a Foreign Member of the St. Petersburg Academy of Engineering in Russia (1992) and a visiting scholar of Tsinghua University in Beijing, China (1992). He was a trustee of the Institute of World Politics and a member of the ASME Industrial Advisory Board. He was the first person selected to receive the Vibration Institute's DECADE award in 1992.

== Publications ==
Bently co-authored the textbook Fundamentals of Rotating Machinery Diagnostics which is used at major universities. Bently authored more than 140 papers and articles dealing rotordynamics and/or condition monitoring technologies and was granted two patents. Many of his articles were peer-reviewed and have been published in technical journals like that of the American Society of Mechanical Engineers (ASME).
