= Jon Bentley =

Jon Bentley may refer to:

- Jon Bentley (computer scientist) (born 1953), American computer scientist
- Jon Bentley (TV presenter) (born 1961), English television presenter
- Jon Bentley (saxophonist) (born 1973), Canadian musician

== See also ==
- John Bentley (disambiguation)
