= Bentley (disambiguation) =

Bentley usually refers to Bentley Motors Limited, a British manufacturer of cars.

Bentley may also refer to:

== Businesses and organizations ==
- Bentley University, Waltham, Massachusetts, U.S.
- Bentley Film Festival, or The Bentley's, in Kansas City, Missouri, U.S.
- Bentley High School (Burton, Michigan), U.S.
- Bentley High School (Livonia, Michigan), U.S.
- Bentley Systems, an American software company
- Bentley & Co, a Canadian luggage and handbag retailer

== Places ==
=== United Kingdom ===
- Bentley, East Riding of Yorkshire
- Fenny Bentley, Derbyshire
- Hungry Bentley, Derbyshire
- Great Bentley, Essex
  - Great Bentley railway station
- Bentley, Essex, a location in Brentwood unparished area
- Little Bentley, Essex
- Bentley, Hampshire
  - Bentley railway station (Hampshire)
- Bentley, Suffolk
  - Bentley railway station (Suffolk) (closed 1966)
- Bentley, South Yorkshire
  - Bentley railway station (South Yorkshire)
- Bentley, Warwickshire
- Bentley, West Midlands
  - Bentley railway station (West Midlands) (closed 1898)
- Bentley, Worcestershire

=== United States ===
- Bentley, Illinois
- Bentley, Kansas
- Bentley, Michigan
- Bentley, North Dakota
- Bentley Township, Michigan

=== Other countries ===
- Bentley Subglacial Trench, Antarctica
- Mount Bentley, Antarctica
- Bentley, Western Australia
- Bentley, Alberta, Canada

== People ==
- Bentley (surname)
- Chukwuma Akabueze, Nigerian footballer nicknamed "Bentley"
- Bentley DeForest Ackley (1872–1958), American musician and gospel composer
- Bentley Baxter Bahn (born 1992), German professional footballer
- Bentley Beetham (1886–1963), English mountaineer, ornithologist and photographer
- Bentley Dean, Australian documentarian, director, producer, cinematographer, and filmmaker
- Bentley Kyle Evans (born 1966), American television writer, producer, director and actor
- Bentley John Heddle (1943–1989), British politician
- Bentley Collingwood Hilliam (1890–1968), English singer, songwriter and musician
- Bentley Hite (1900–1992), American attorney and politician
- Bentley Kassal (1917–2019), American attorney and litigation
- Bentley Layton (1941–2025), American professor of religious studies
- Bentley Little (born 1960), American author of horror fiction
- Bentley Meeker, American artist and lightning designer
- Bentley Mitchum (born 1967), American actor
- Bentley Purchase (1890–1961), British physician and barrister
- Bentley Royer (born 1955), Dominican politician
- Bentley Schaad (1925–1999), American modernist and art educator
- Bentley Springer (born 1979), Barbadian footballer
- Bentley Lyonel John Tollemache, 3rd Baron Tollemache (1883–1955), British Army officer
- Bentley Vass, South African politician
- Bentley Warren (born 1940), American racecar driver
- Bentley Wimble (1864–1927), South African cricketer
- Bentley Gregg, fictional character from Bachelor Father

== Other uses ==
- Bentley (Sly Cooper character), from the Sly Cooper video game series
- Bentley site, an archaeological site in Kentucky.

== See also ==
- Bently (disambiguation)
- Bentley Priory, stately home and deer park in Stanmore, England
  - RAF Bentley Priory
- Bentley's Miscellany, a literary magazine 1836–1868
- Bentleigh (disambiguation)
