= John Bentley =

John Bentley may refer to:

== Politics ==
- John Bentley (MP) (fl. 1390), MP for Surrey
- John Bentley (politician) (1822–1894), Wisconsin state assemblyman
- John A. Bentley (1836–1912), Wisconsin state senator

== Sports ==
- John Bentley (cricketer) (1787–1859), English cricketer
- John Bentley (football manager) (1860–1918), English football manager
- John Bentley (rower) (born 1957), Australian Olympic rower
- John Bentley (rugby) (born 1966), English dual-code international rugby footballer
- John Edmund Bentley (1847–1913), English rugby international

== Others ==
- John Bentley (harpsichordist) (c. 1756–1813), English-Canadian organist, choirmaster, harpsichordist and composer
- John Bentley (Royal Navy officer) (died 1772), who gave his name to HMS Bentley
- John Francis Bentley (1839–1902), English architect
- John Irving Bentley (1874–1966), American physician and alleged victim of spontaneous human combustion
- John Boyd Bentley (1896–1989), second bishop of the Episcopal Diocese of Alaska
- John Bentley (actor) (1916–2009), British actor
- John Bentley (bassist) (born 1951), British bass guitarist for the UK band Squeeze

== See also ==
- The John Bentley School, Calne, Wiltshire, England
- Jack Bentley (disambiguation)
- Jon Bentley (disambiguation)
