= Bentleigh =

Bentleigh may refer to:

- Bentleigh, Victoria, Australia; a suburb of Melbourne
  - Bentleigh railway station
- Electoral district of Bentleigh, Victoria, Australia
- Bentleigh Football Netball Club, of the SFNL, in Melbourne, Victoria, Australia
- Bentleigh Secondary College, Bentleigh East, Victoria, Australia

== See also ==
- Bentleigh East, Victoria, Australia; a suburb of Melbourne
- Bentleigh West Primary School, Glen Eira, Victoria, Australia
- Bentley (disambiguation)
- Bently (disambiguation)
