= Eddy current brake =

Device used to slow or stop a moving object by generating eddy currents

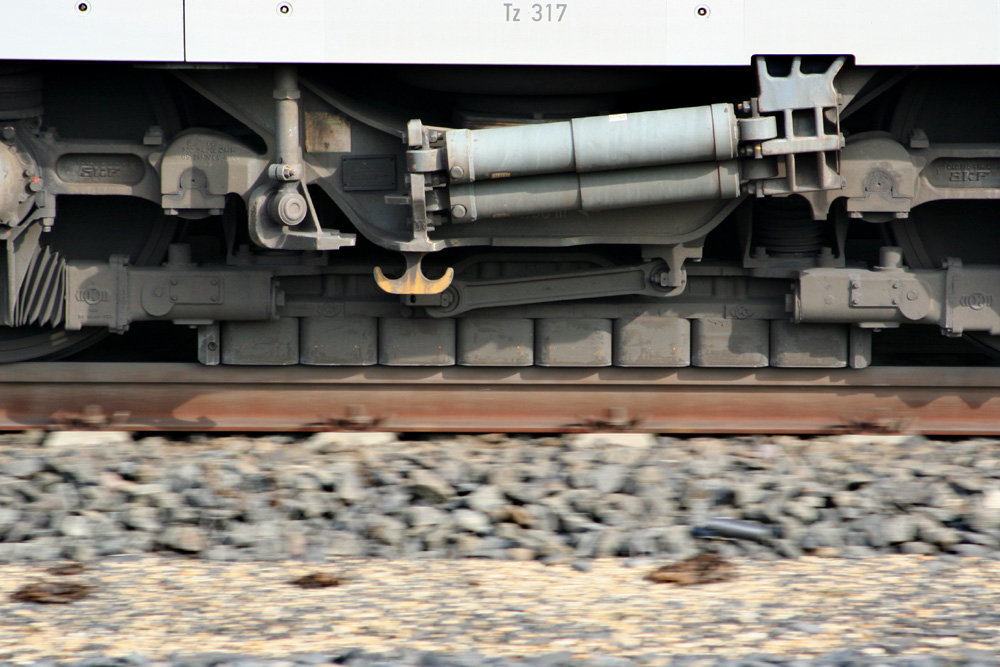
A linear eddy current brake in a German ICE 3 high-speed train in action

An eddy current brake, also known as an induction brake, Faraday brake, electric brake or electric retarder, is a device used to slow or stop a moving object by generating eddy currents and thus dissipating its kinetic energy as heat. Unlike friction brakes, where the drag force that stops the moving object is provided by friction between two surfaces pressed together, the drag force in an eddy current brake is an electromagnetic force between a magnet and a nearby conductive object in relative motion, due to eddy currents induced in the conductor through electromagnetic induction.

A conductive surface moving past a stationary magnet develops circular electric currents called eddy currents induced in it by the magnetic field, as described by Faraday's law of induction. By Lenz's law, the circulating currents create their own magnetic field that opposes the field of the magnet. Thus the moving conductor experiences a drag force from the magnet that opposes its motion, proportional to its velocity. The kinetic energy of the moving object is dissipated as heat generated by the current flowing through the electrical resistance of the conductor.

In an eddy current brake the magnetic field may be created by a permanent magnet or an electromagnet. With an electromagnet system, the braking force can be turned on and off (or varied) by varying the electric current in the electromagnet windings. Another advantage is that since the brake does not work by friction, there are no brake shoe surfaces to wear, eliminating replacement as with friction brakes. A disadvantage is that since the braking force is proportional to the relative velocity of the brake, the brake has no holding force when the moving object is stationary, as provided by static friction in a friction brake, hence in vehicles it must be supplemented by a friction brake.

In some cases, energy in the form of momentum stored within a motor or other machine is used to energize any electromagnets involved. The result is a motor or other machine that rapidly comes to rest when power is removed. Care must be taken in such designs to ensure that components involved are not stressed beyond operational limits during such deceleration, which may greatly exceed design forces of acceleration during normal operation.

Combined experiment for Lenz Law & Eddy Current. Eddy currents are induced in conductors when a conductor is exposed to a changing magnetic field; due to relative motion of the field source and conductor or due to variations of the field with time. This concept is also used in Electromagnetic braking.

Eddy current brakes are used to slow high-speed trains and roller coasters, as a complement for friction brakes in semi-trailer trucks to help prevent brake wear and overheating, to stop powered tools quickly when power is turned off, and in electric meters used by electric utilities.

== Mechanism and principle ==
A metal sheet moving to the right under a magnet, illustrating how a linear eddy current brake works. In this drawing the magnet is drawn spaced apart from the sheet to reveal the vectors; in an eddy current brake the magnet is normally located as close to the sheet as possible.

A circular or disk eddy current brake

An eddy current brake consists of a conductive piece of metal, either a straight bar or a disk, which moves through the magnetic field of a magnet, either a permanent magnet or an electromagnet. When it moves past the stationary magnet, the magnet exerts a drag force on the metal which opposes its motion, due to circular electric currents called eddy currents induced in the metal by the magnetic field. Note that the conductive sheet [?] is not made of ferromagnetic metal such as iron or steel; usually copper or aluminum are used, which are not attracted to a magnet. The brake does not work by the simple attraction of a ferromagnetic metal to the magnet.

See the diagram at right. It shows a metal sheet (C) moving to the right under a magnet. The magnetic field (B, green arrows) of the magnet's north pole N passes down through the sheet. Since the metal is moving, the magnetic flux through the sheet is changing. At the part of the sheet under the leading edge of the magnet (left side) the magnetic field through the sheet is increasing as it gets nearer the magnet. From Faraday's law of induction, this field induces a counterclockwise flow of electric current (I, red), in the sheet. This is the eddy current. In contrast, at the trailing edge of the magnet (right side) the magnetic field through the sheet is decreasing, inducing a clockwise eddy current in the sheet.

Another way to understand the action is to see that the free charge carriers (electrons) in the metal sheet are moving to the right, so the magnetic field exerts a sideways force on them due to the Lorentz force. Since the velocity v of the charges is to the right and the magnetic field B is directed down, from the right hand rule the Lorentz force on positive charges qv×B is toward the rear in the diagram (to the left when facing in the direction of motion of the sheet) This causes a current I toward the rear under the magnet, which circles around through parts of the sheet outside the magnetic field in two currents, clockwise to the right and counterclockwise to the left, to the front of the magnet again. The mobile charge carriers in the metal, the electrons, actually have a negative charge, so their motion is opposite in direction to the conventional current shown.

As described by Ampere's circuital law, each of these circular currents creates a counter magnetic field (blue arrows), which in accordance with Lenz's law opposes the change in magnetic field, causing a drag force on the sheet which is the braking force exerted by the brake. At the leading edge of the magnet (left side) by the right hand rule the counterclockwise current creates a magnetic field pointed up, opposing the magnet's field, causing a repulsive force between the sheet and the leading edge of the magnet. In contrast, at the trailing edge (right side), the clockwise current causes a magnetic field pointed down, in the same direction as the magnet's field, creating an attractive force between the sheet and the trailing edge of the magnet. Both of these forces oppose the motion of the sheet. The kinetic energy which is consumed overcoming this drag force is dissipated as heat by the currents flowing through the resistance of the metal, so the metal gets warm under the magnet.

The braking force of an eddy current brake is exactly proportional to the velocity V, so it acts similar to viscous friction in a liquid. The braking force decreases as the velocity decreases. When the conductive sheet is stationary, the magnetic field through each part of it is constant, not changing with time, so no eddy currents are induced, and there is no force between the magnet and the conductor. Thus an eddy current brake has no holding force.

Eddy current brakes come in two geometries:

- In a linear eddy current brake, the conductive piece is a straight rail or track that the magnet moves along.
- In a circular, disk or rotary eddy current brake, the conductor is a flat disk rotor that turns between the poles of the magnet.

The physical working principle is the same for both.

== Disk eddy current brakes ==
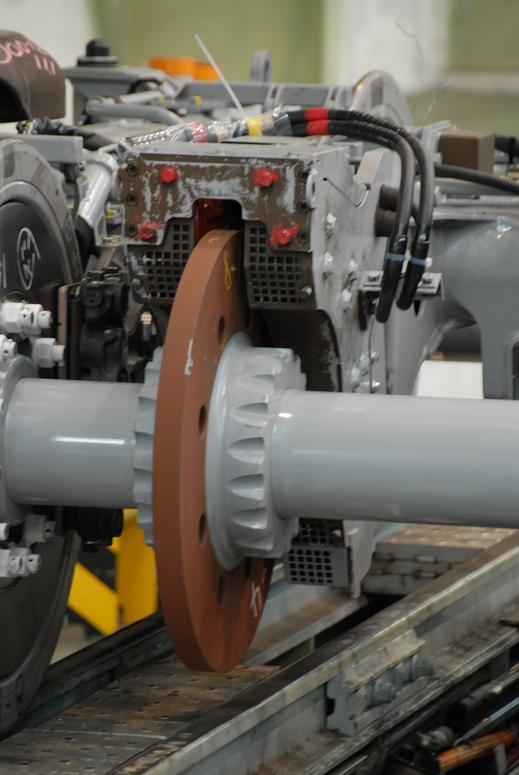
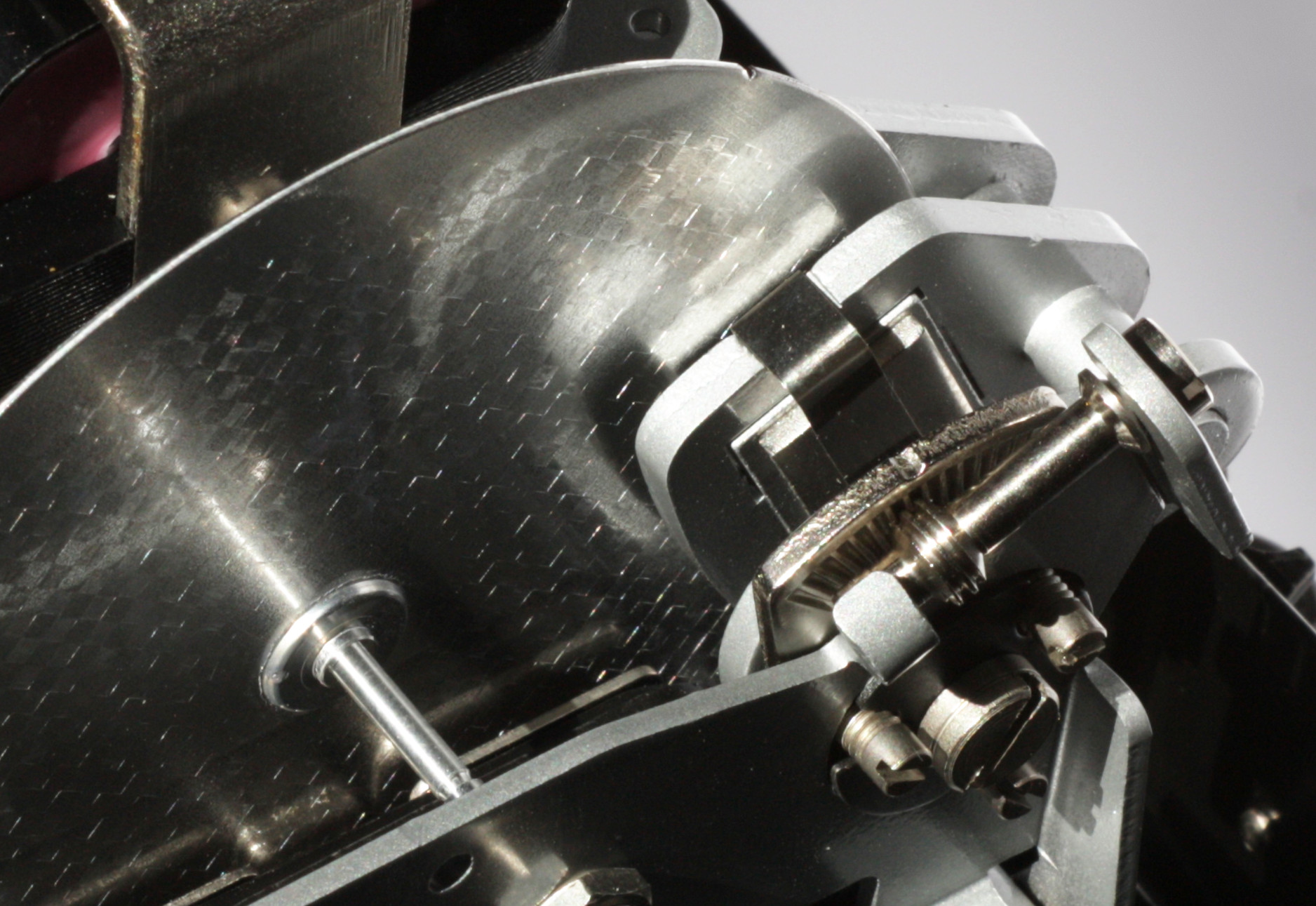
(left) Disk eddy current brake on 700 Series Shinkansen, a Japanese bullet train.
(right) Permanent magnet eddy current brake used in a 1970s electricity meter

Disk electromagnetic brakes are used on vehicles such as trains, and power tools such as circular saws, to stop the blade quickly when the power is turned off. A disk eddy current brake consists of a conductive non-ferromagnetic metal disc (rotor) attached to the axle of the vehicle's wheel, with an electromagnet located with its poles on each side of the disk, so the magnetic field passes through the disk. The electromagnet allows the braking force to be varied. When no current is passed through the electromagnet's winding, there is no braking force. When the driver steps on the brake pedal, current is passed through the electromagnet windings, creating a magnetic field. The greater the current in the winding, the greater the eddy currents and the stronger the braking force. Power tool brakes use permanent magnets, which are moved adjacent to the disk by a linkage when the power is turned off. The kinetic energy of the vehicle's motion is dissipated in Joule heating by the eddy currents passing through the disk's resistance, so like conventional friction disk brakes, the disk becomes hot. Unlike in the linear brake below, the metal of the disk passes repeatedly through the magnetic field, so disk eddy current brakes get hotter than linear eddy current brakes.

Japanese Shinkansen trains had employed circular eddy current brake system on trailer cars since 100 Series Shinkansen. The N700 Series Shinkansen abandoned eddy current brakes in favour of regenerative brakes, since 14 of the 16 cars in the trainset used electric motors. In regenerative brakes, the motor that drives the wheel is used as a generator to produce electric current, which can be used to charge a battery, enabling the energy to be reused.

== Dynamometer eddy current absorbers ==
A 6-minute ‘how-it-works video’ tutorial explaining how engine-dynamometer and chassis dyno eddy-current absorbers work.

Most chassis dynamometers and many engine dynos use an eddy-current brake as a means of providing an electrically adjustable load on the engine. They are often referred to as an "absorber" in such applications.

Inexpensive air-cooled versions are typically used on chassis dynamometers, where their inherently high-inertia steel rotors are an asset rather than a liability. Conversely, performance engine dynamometers tend to utilize low-inertia, high RPM, liquid-cooled configurations. Downsides of eddy-current absorbers in such applications, compared to expensive AC-motor based dynamometers, is their inability to provide stall-speed (zero RPM) loading or to motor the engine - for starting or motoring (downhill simulation).

Since they do not actually absorb energy, provisions to transfer their radiated heat out of the test cell area must be provided. Either a high-volume air-ventilation or water-to-air heat exchanger adds additional cost and complexity. In contrast, high-end AC-motor dynamometers cleanly return the engine's power to the grid.

== Linear eddy current brakes ==
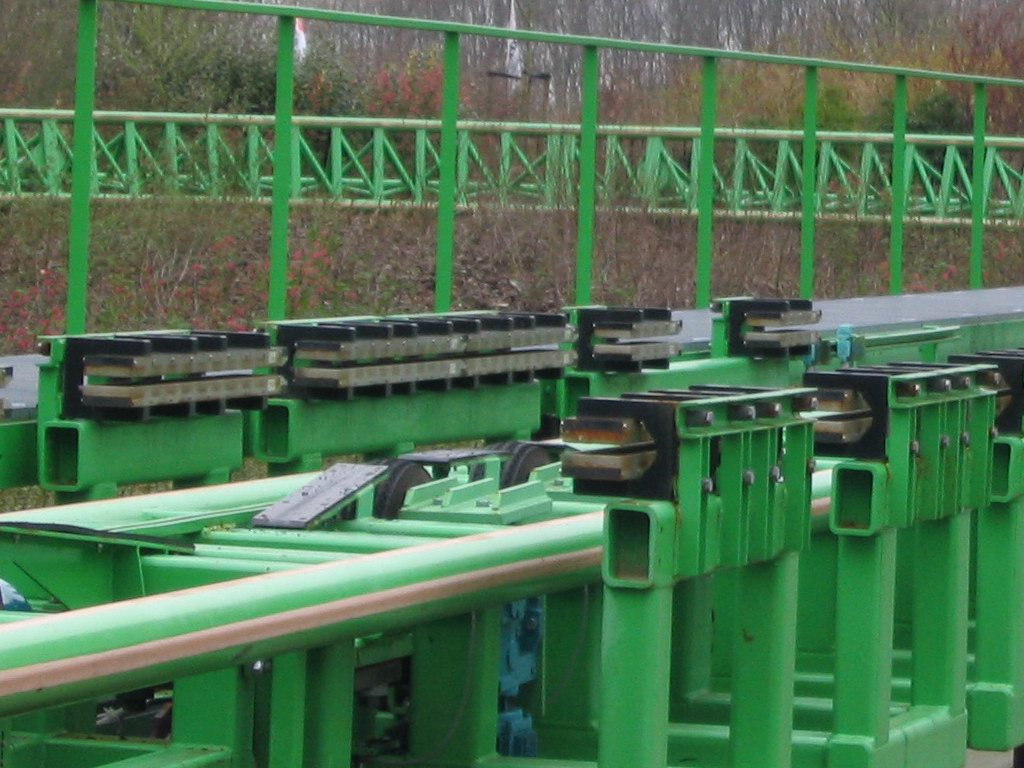
Eddy current brakes on the roller coaster Goliath made by Intamin, at Walibi Holland (Netherlands)

Linear eddy current brakes are used on some rail vehicles, such as trains. They are used on roller coasters, to stop cars smoothly at the end of the ride.

The linear eddy current brake consists of a magnetic yoke with electrical coils positioned along the rail, which are being magnetized alternating as south and north magnetic poles. This magnet does not touch the rail, but is held at a constant small distance from the rail of approximately 7 mm (the eddy current brake should not be confused with another device, the magnetic brake, which exerts its braking force by friction of a brake shoe with the rail).(Unlike mechanical brakes, which are based on friction and kinetic energy, eddy current brakes rely on electromagnetism to stop objects from moving.) It works the same as a disk eddy current brake, by inducing closed loops of eddy current in the conductive rail, which generate counter magnetic fields which oppose the motion of the train.

The kinetic energy of the moving vehicle is converted to heat by the eddy current flowing through the electrical resistance of the rail, which leads to a warming of the rail. An advantage of the linear brake is that since each section of rail passes only once through the magnetic field of the brake, in contrast to the disk brake in which each section of the disk passes repeatedly through the brake, the rail doesn't get as hot as a disk, so the linear brake can dissipate more energy and have a higher power rating than disk brakes.

The eddy current brake does not have any mechanical contact with the rail, thus no wear, and creates neither noise nor odor. The eddy current brake is unusable at low speeds, but can be used at high speeds for emergency braking and service braking.

The TSI (Technical Specifications for Interoperability) of the EU for trans-European high-speed rail recommends that all newly built high-speed lines should make the eddy current brake possible.

Modern roller coasters use this type of braking. To avoid the risk posed by power outages, they utilize permanent magnets instead of electromagnets, thus not requiring a power supply. This application lacks the possibility of adjusting braking strength as easily as with electromagnets.

== Lab experiment ==
In physics education a simple experiment is sometimes used to illustrate eddy currents and the principle behind magnetic braking. When a strong magnet is dropped down a vertical, non-ferrous, conducting pipe, eddy currents are induced in the pipe, and these retard the descent of the magnet, so it falls slower than it would if free-falling. As one set of authors explained

If one views the magnet as an assembly of circulating atomic currents moving through the pipe, [then] Lenz’s law implies that the induced eddies in the pipe wall counter circulate ahead of the moving magnet and co-circulate behind it. But this implies that the moving magnet is repelled in front and attracted in rear, hence acted upon by a retarding force.

In typical experiments, students measure the slower time of fall of the magnet through a copper tube compared with a cardboard tube, and may use an oscilloscope to observe the pulse of eddy current induced in a loop of wire wound around the pipe when the magnet falls through.

== See also ==
- Dynamic braking - either rheostatic (dissipating the train's energy as heat in resistor banks within the train, or regenerative where the energy is returned to the electrical supply system)
- Electromagnetic brakes (or electro-mechanical brakes) – use the magnetic force to press the brake mechanically on the rail
- Linear induction motor can be used as a regenerative brake
