= Daniel Bentley =

Daniel Bentley, Danny Bentley, or Dan Bentley may refer to:

- Dan Bentley (born 1984), English paralympic boccia player
- Dan Bentley (footballer) (born 1993), English footballer
- Daniel Bentley (civil servant) (1789–1869), Danish civil servant
- Daniel S. Bentley (1850–1916), American minister, writer, and newspaper proprietor
- Danny Bentley, American politician and pharmacologist
