= Robert Bentley =

Robert or Bob Bentley may refer to:

- Robert Bentley (botanist) (1821–1893), English botanist
- Robert Bentley (animator) (1907–2000), American animator
- Robert Bentley (cricketer) (born 1958), Zimbabwean cricketer
- Robert Bentley (police officer) (died 1910), British police officer
- Robert J. Bentley (born 1943), retired physician, Governor of Alabama, 2011–2017
- Bob Bentley (politician) (1928–2013), Canadian politician
- Bobby Bentley (born 1968), American high school and college football coach
