= Bently Nevada =

Technology and service company

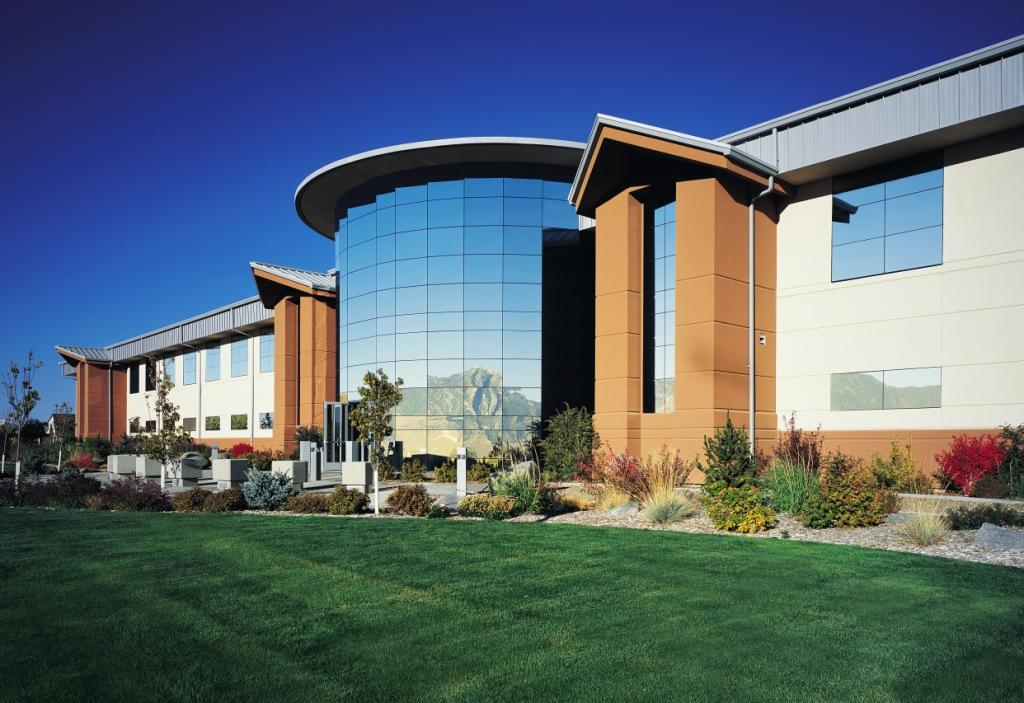
The Baker Hughes facility in Minden, Nevada designs and manufactures Bently Nevada products.

Bently Nevada is an asset protection and condition monitoring hardware, software and service company for industrial plant-wide operations. Its products are used to monitor the mechanical condition of rotating equipment in a wide variety of industries including oil and gas production, hydroelectric, wind, hydrocarbon processing, electric power generation, pulp and paper, mining, water and wastewater treatment. The company was founded in 1961 by Don Bently. Bently Nevada is headquartered in Minden, Nevada, about one hour south of Reno. Don Bently was the first to manufacture a commercially successful eddy-current proximity probe which measured vibration in high-speed turbomachinery by allowing the direct observation of the rotating shaft. The company also performed research in the field of rotordynamics, furthering knowledge of machinery malfunctions such as shaft cracks and fluid-induced instabilities. Its research also helped refine the equations used to describe vibratory behavior in rotordynamic systems.

Bently Nevada was privately held until 2002 when it was acquired by General Electric and became part of GE Oil and Gas. In 2017 GE purchased Baker Hughes and merged this with the GE Oil and Gas division to form Baker Hughes, a GE company (BHGE). GE retained a 62.5% share of the merged company. In 2019, GE announced plans to reduce its ownership in Baker Hughes from 50.4% to 38.4% losing majority control. In October, 2019, GE sold a portion of its 62.5% stake in BHGE, reducing its ownership below 50%, and BHGE was rechristened as Baker Hughes Company (NYSE:BKR). Baker Hughes has positioned itself as an energy technology company. Bently Nevada remained a Baker Hughes Business after GE's sale of its interest in the company. As of 2020, Baker Hughes Company has operations in over 120 countries.

Since the inception of the proximity probe, Bently Nevada has been a key company in the asset protection and condition monitoring market. It has made key contributions to machine monitoring standards. As of 2018, it employed over 1,400 people worldwide, with facilities in nine countries, and had over four million sensors installed. With over a dozen different models of monitoring systems sold over more than 40 years, it has the largest installed base of permanently installed transducers and monitoring channels in the world.

== Founding ==
Don Bently was briefly employed by the Rocketdyne division of North American Aviation in the mid-1950s. Bently assisted with research into the use of eddy-current electronic sensing technologies for aircraft control systems. He thought that there was limited use for the technology in aircraft controls, but believed it showed commercial promise in other areas. He received permission to use the technology in his own endeavors. In 1956, he left the aerospace industry and gave up completing a doctorate degree to form Bently Scientific Company, manufacturing and selling eddy-current products via mail order from his garage in Berkeley, California. In 1958, a team from Pepperl+Fuchs invented an inductive eddy-current sensor as a replacement for a mechanical switch.

== Move to Nevada ==
In 1960, Bently was looking to relocate his small company out of Berkeley. He found an 8000 square foot vacant building at the Minden, NV airport. He negotiated a lease with Douglas county and in 1961 moved the 3 employee company. He changed the name to Bently Nevada Corp and incorporated in Nevada.

Don Bently began with miniature vacuum tubes but soon realized the advantages offered by solid-state components. He was the first to transistorize the design and make it commercially practical as a means to measure machine vibration and thrust position protection systems in rotating machinery.

In the company's early years, its non-contacting displacement sensors were used primarily by manufacturers in their laboratories rather than in industrial plants. Don Bently operated the business by himself and designed to order "distance detectors" that produced very precise bench-top measurements. He hired five employees in 1961.

Bently Nevada was the first to successfully apply eddy-current technology for use in non-contacting displacement sensors. This type of electronic sensor is typically used to measure very small distances between the tip of the sensor and a conductive surface, such as rotating shaft. The displacements measured are extremely small, typically only several thousandths of an inch. Bently's application of eddy-current sensor technology was the foundation of an entire industry.

Bently added proximity transducers, monitors, and portable test equipment to its catalog. The company shifted from mail-order to partnering with industrial representatives. It started a factory-direct sales force in Houston in 1967. Bently coined the term Proximitor to represent proximity monitor.

== Develops monitoring devices ==
In the early 1960s, industrial users of turbomachinery began to experiment with the use of these sensors for measuring vibration. Direct observation of the vibratory motion of a machine's shaft is desirable because most often, the shaft is the source of vibration in the machine. Previous to the introduction of the so-called "Bently probe," this shaft motion had to be indirectly inferred by measuring the vibration of the machine's casing. While machinery casing measurements can be valuable under certain conditions, machines that employ fluid bearings generally have damping and stiffness characteristics that do not adequately transmit shaft vibration to the machine's casing. Consequently, direct observation of the machine's shaft (rotor) was recognized as a more accurate method of assessing condition on such machines.

Bently found that many of the third-party monitoring systems used with the Bently transducer systems were not properly configured. After repeated challenges resolving problems caused by the third-party monitoring systems, Bently decided to manufacture his own monitoring devices. Bently included the ability to generate alarms if vibration levels were excessive, which could alert operators and turn off the machine if necessary. This allowed Bently Nevada to offer machinery protection systems, not just monitoring systems.

It introduced the 5000 monitoring series in 1965 which was produced through 1998. This was followed by the 1700 series introduced in 1973, the 9000 series started in 1975, the 3300 series in 1988, and 3500 series in 1995. As of May 2020, new generations of the 3500 are still sold.

The company opened an office in Ohio in 1965 and another in Louisiana in 1968. In 1969 it opened its first international office in the Netherlands. In the same year, the company had 150 employees. It shifted sales from primarily third-party representatives to in-house, factory-direct sales force. The company grew from 200 employees in 1970 to 1000 by 1979.

The eddy-current proximity probes pioneered by Bently addressed this need. In 1970 the American Petroleum Institute designated the proximity probe as the measurement device for measuring acceptable shaft vibration during factory acceptance testing. It added this as a requirement to its standard for centrifugal compressors. Bently's pioneering design for shaft vibration measurement using proximity probes became the de facto industry standard for turbomachinery acceptance testing and machinery protection. The eddy-current proximity probe became the preferred method for assessing vibration and overall mechanical condition on large turbomachinery employing fluid bearings. Such machines and bearing types account for the vast majority of compressors, turbines, pumps, electric motors, generators, and other rotating equipment exceeding 1,000 HP, and can be found in abundance in most industrial plants. As a result, the primary focus of the company shifted from laboratory measurements to industrial measurements on rotating machinery.

The company continued to expand, making diagnostic instruments such as spectrum analyzers, tunable filters, and other signal conditioning and recording apparatus, in addition to its sensors and monitors. As time went by, it also became apparent that customers were in need of expertise to help interpret their vibration measurements. In response to this, the company expanded its service organization in the 1980s beyond instrument installation and repair to include a team of machinery diagnostic engineers, skilled in collecting and interpreting vibration signals to help customers identify and correct machinery malfunctions. By 2002, Bently Nevada Corporation had more than 10,000 active products in its catalog and more than 100 offices in 42 countries.

== Rotating machinery research ==
In 1981, Bently branched out from his instrumentation manufacturing activities and established a pure research organization called Bently Rotordynamics Research Corporation (BRDRC or "Birdrock"). Its objective was to conduct rotordynamic research, furthering the knowledge of rotating machinery behavior, modeling techniques, and malfunction diagnostic methodologies. Its mission was considered complementary to Bently Nevada, with BRDRC focused on understanding how machinery behaved, and Bently Nevada focused on understanding and building instrumentation to measure machinery behavior.

BRDRC made a number of important contributions to the field of rotordynamics such as a better understanding of fluid-induced instabilities, advanced models for understanding shaft crack behavior, insight into rubbing malfunctions between stationary and rotating parts, and enhancement of the rotordynamic equations with a new variable lambda (λ) which denoted "the fluid circumferential average velocity ratio".

BRDRC also introduced several new data presentation formats, such as so-called "full" spectrum plots and "acceptance region" trend plots. Its research findings were published extensively in relevant technical journals, and the research that had practical commercial applications found its way into the Bently Nevada product line. Rotordynamic and machinery diagnostic expertise remains a core part of the Bently Nevada product line through its machinery diagnostics services organization.

== Builds new facility ==
In 1978, Don Bently acquired the Buckeye Ranch which had previously been owned by the Dengberg family. They had built brick barns at Orchard and Buckeye Roads, known as Ferris Heights, that allowed them to breed sheep earlier in the year. Bently renamed the location Bently Science Park. In 2001, Bently Nevada built a new $30 million, 283,000 square feet (26,300 m^{2}) headquarters on 26 acres (11 ha). Bricks from some of the sheep barns were incorporated into the façade of the new building.

Don Bently required the building to withstand an earthquake measuring 8 on the Richter scale, which is four times as severe as the earthquake that struck Izmit earthquake in August, 2001, leveling thousands of buildings and killing more than 40,000 people. The new location consolidated at one site manufacturing, design, development, marketing, and sales operations that had previously been located at eight different locations around Carson Valley.

== Acquisition by GE ==
The company's focus on rotordynamics and vibration sensors resulted in substantial growth. At age 78, Bently sold Bently Nevada to GE Energy in January 2002 for between $600 million and $900 million. By then the company had 1,200 people at its headquarters in Minden, Nevada, 2,100 employees worldwide, 100 offices in more than 40 countries, and global sales exceeding $235 million USD. Bently said he sold Bently Nevada so he could concentrate on other interests.

== Separation from GE, integration with Baker Hughes ==
In 2019, GE announced plans to reduce its ownership in Baker Hughes from 50.4% to 38.4% losing majority control. In September 2019, GE sold a large enough stake in Baker Hughes to lose its status as majority shareholder. With the loss of GE as major shareholder, the independent Baker Hughes Company initiated processes to separate its financial and other operations from GE. The company positioning itself as an independent energy technology company (NYSE:BKR). Bently Nevada remains a Baker Hughes business following the break from GE. Baker Hughes Company currently has operations in over 120 countries.
