= Jack Bentley =

Jack Bentley may refer to:

- Jack Bentley (footballer) (1942–2007), English footballer
- Jack Bentley (baseball) (1895–1969), American baseball player
- Jack Bentley (musician) (1913–1994), English trombonist and journalist

== See also ==
- John Bentley (disambiguation)
