= Killing of Kirsty Bentley =

Mysterious murder in New Zealand

Kirsty Bentley
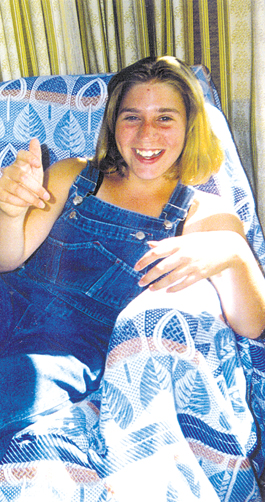
- On 30 December 1998, Kirsty shortly before her death the next day on New Year's Eve.
- Born: Kirsty Marianne Bentley; 18 January 1983; Christchurch, New Zealand
- Died: 31 December 1998 (aged 15); Canterbury, New Zealand
- Cause of death: Blunt force trauma
- Body discovered: 17 January 1999
- Parents: Sidney Bentley (father); Jill Bentley (mother)

Kirsty Marianne Bentley (18 January 1983 – 31 December 1998) was a teenager living in Ashburton, New Zealand, who went missing while walking her family dog on the afternoon of 31 December 1998. After an extensive search lasting several weeks, her body was found in dense scrub approximately 40 km away. The New Zealand Police consider the case to be a homicide, and it remains one of the highest-profile unsolved murders in New Zealand.

== Early life ==
Kirsty Marianne Bentley was born on 18 January 1983 at The Christchurch Women's Hospital. She was the second child of her parents, Jill and Sidney Bentley; she had an older brother, John (born 1979).

Bentley was by all accounts a normal teenager. Her mother has described her as vibrant, honest and compassionate. She was confident and direct with people she knew, but could be shy and reserved with those she did not. Bentley had a strong creative streak that she expressed through drama classes and poetry. She attended Ashburton College, and at school she was well liked and had a close-knit friend group. She had recently begun dating a local boy from one of her classes.

== Disappearance ==
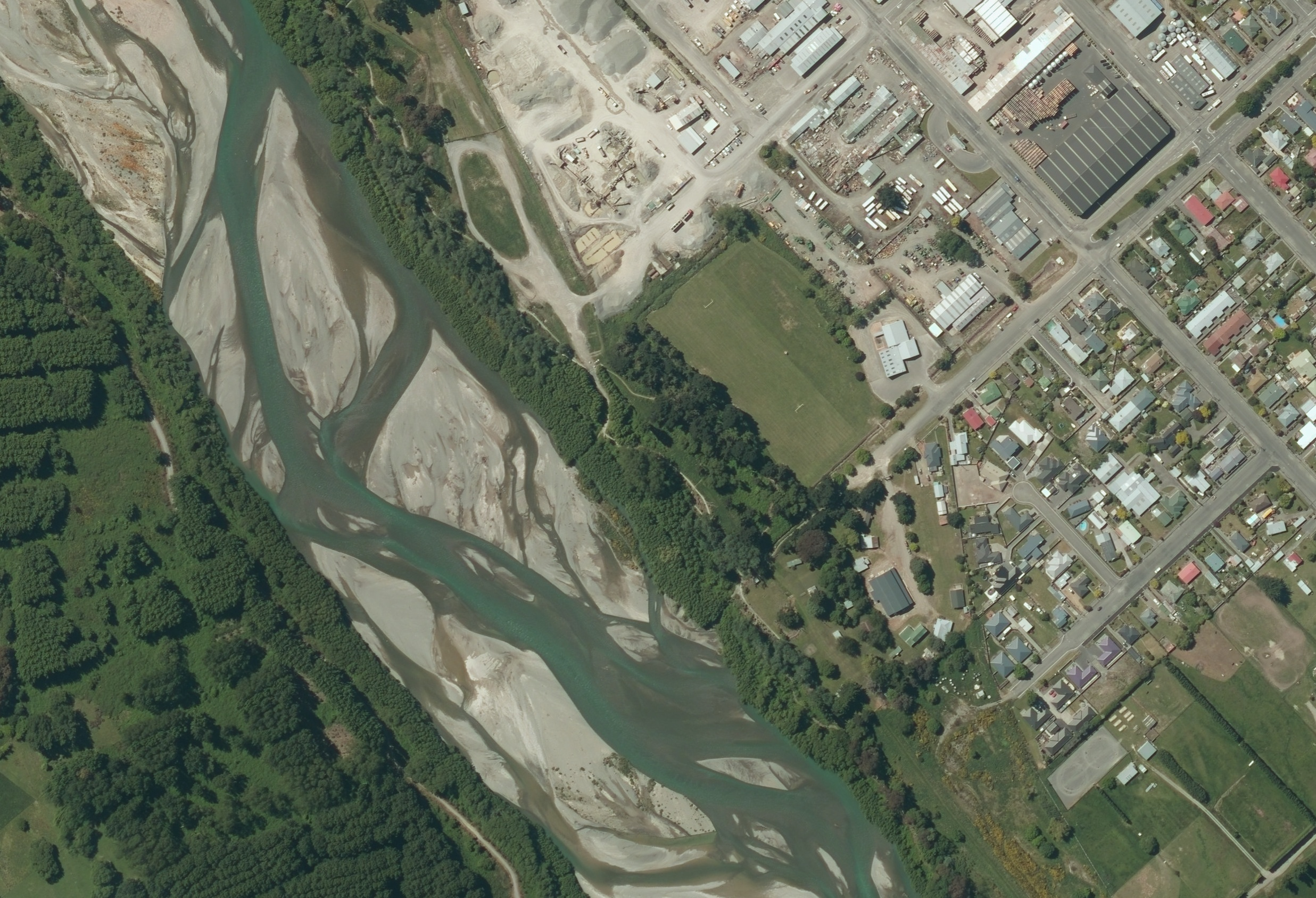
The area near Chalmers Avenue, Ashburton, from which Bentley went missing. The family dog, Abby, was found tied up in the area of trees in the centre of the image.

On the day of her disappearance, Bentley met a friend at the Ashburton library at around 10:30am on New Year's Eve (31 December) 1998. After doing some shopping, they had lunch at McDonald's around midday. Bentley was dropped off at her home by her friend's sister at around 2:30pm.

After returning home, her brother John told her that her boyfriend had called and left a message, asking her to call him back. Phone records show she made a call to her boyfriend at 2:38pm, but he wasn't there so she left a message asking him to call her back.

From here, it appears Bentley decided to take the family's black Labrador dog, Abby, for a walk. This was not unusual for Bentley; she often took the dog for a walk to pass the time. John did not hear her leaving the house. A neighbour witnessed her walking by his house with the dog at 3:05pm, but from this point on the exact timeline of what happened to her cannot be clearly established.

== Search ==
Bentley's boyfriend called back at 4:30pm, and at this time John noticed that his sister was still absent. When his mother, Jill, returned home from work at around 5:15pm, he immediately told her that Bentley had not come home. After calling Bentley's boyfriend to confirm that he did not know where Kirsty was, Jill conducted the first search, by walking the route Bentley would normally take down to the Ashburton River. However, she was becoming increasingly anxious and soon decided to turn back.

After returning to the house, she and John agreed to wait until 6pm before conducting another search, in case Kirsty came home of her own accord. John left to search the dog walking route just before 6pm, and shortly afterwards Kirsty's father, Sid, returned home. When he was told Kirsty was missing, he immediately notified police.

After police became involved the search rapidly grew more intense throughout the evening, with a mixture of police staff, family members and friends canvassing the area looking for Bentley. This first search continued through the entire night. Nothing was found.

The official search and rescue operation began at 8am the next day. At around 10am, the family dog, Abby, was found tied to a tree in a patch of dense foliage beside the Ashburton River, close to Robilliard Park. The general area had been searched the previous night, but the dog had not been found; the dense foliage means it is possible she was missed during this search. The dog was found tied to a tree with a lead of the same type that the family owned, however the family initially believed the lead did not belong to them.

Nearby two items of clothing, underwear and boxer shorts, were found. These were later confirmed to belong to Bentley.

Over the next 16 days, police and volunteers meticulously searched the Ashburton area of Canterbury. Initially the search was focused on the Ashburton township but it expanded out to cover a much larger area of Canterbury. The New Zealand Army sent troops from Burnham Military Camp to help in the effort also.

== Discovery ==
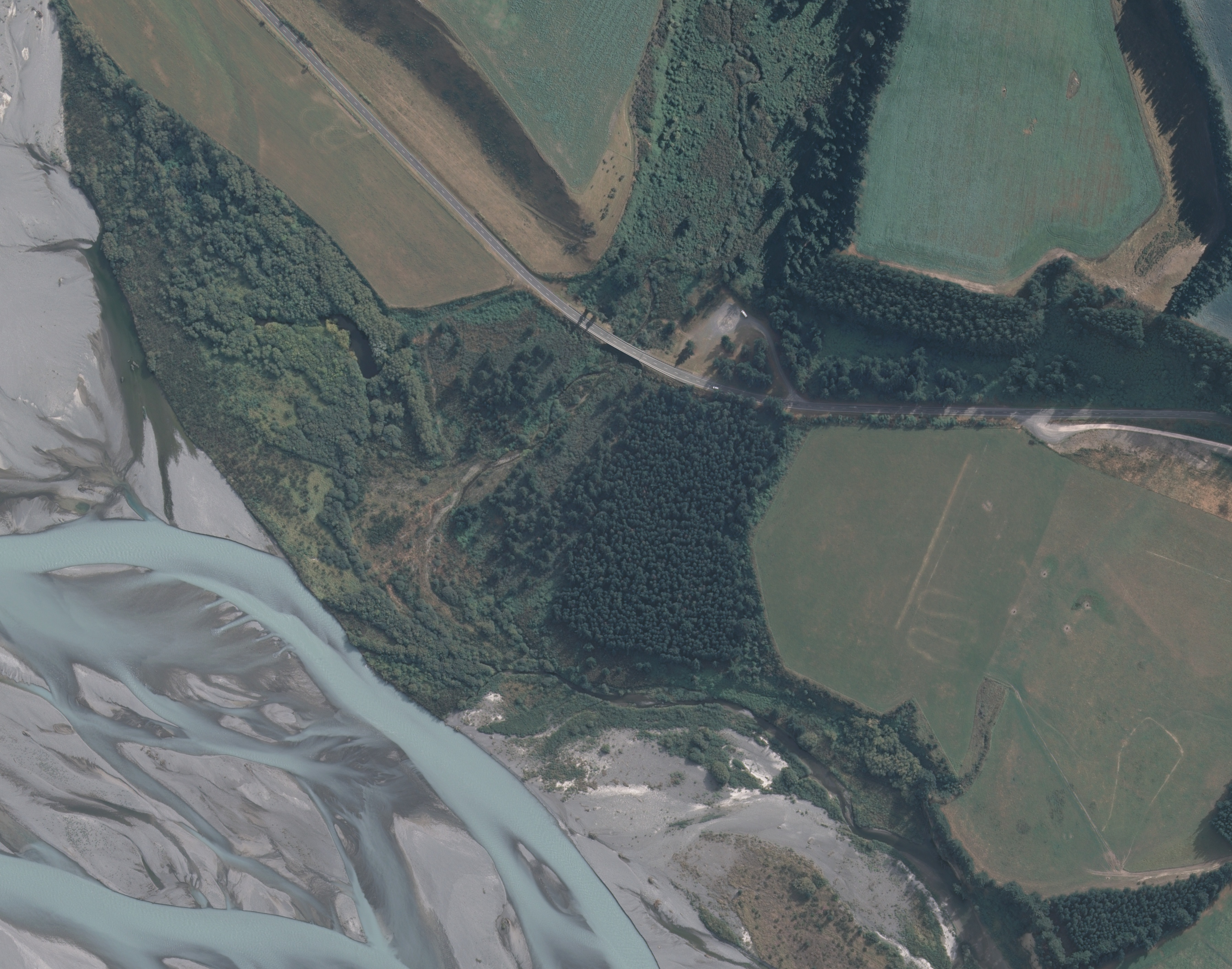
The area of Camp Gully, Rakaia, where Bentley's body was discovered.

On 17 January 1999, the day before her 16th birthday, two men in the Camp Gully area of Rakaia, roughly 40 km away from Ashburton, found a badly decomposed human body lying in a patch of overgrown scrub and planted pine. The body was later confirmed to be Bentley's.

The body was lying at the bottom of a steep embankment, covered in a thin layer of branches and leaves. She had been placed in the fetal position and was fully clothed in what she had last been seen wearing, with the exception of the underwear that had previously been found at the scene of her disappearance. A large paddock was at the top of an embankment above her, and the location was close to State Highway 72, part of the Inland Scenic Route.

The area she was found is known for being used by illegal cannabis growers, and the men who found her were out looking for a cannabis patch. Initially they were reluctant to contact police, but decided the discovery was too important not to report.

== Investigation ==
After the discovery, Police closed the scene and ordered a no-fly zone over the area as they conducted their investigation. They conducted an extensive scene examination over several days, and took plaster casts of tire tracks in the area.

It was the height of summer, and so Bentley's body was in an advanced state of decomposition. She was recovered and transported to Christchurch Hospital where a post-mortem was conducted. It took three days before dental records were used to formally identify the body.

Bentley was killed by blunt force trauma to the right-side of the back of her head. The blow or blows was inflicted with enough force to severely fracture her skull. The pathologist determined she would have died shortly after the wound was inflicted. Police initially withheld her cause of death from the public for operational reasons. The pathologist believed she was killed soon after she went missing, and that it was likely that she was placed in the Camp Gully area the same night, based on an examination of her stomach contents and the state of her body.

Police asked for help from the public regarding vehicles that may have been seen in the area at the time. They also asked for cannabis growers to come forward if they had seen anything. These calls to the public did not reveal anything useful.

== Funeral ==
A funeral for Bentley was held at St Stephen's Anglican Church in Ashburton on 25 January 1999. Between 500 and 700 people attended. Bentley's body was cremated, and her ashes sealed in a steel urn. The urn was buried in a specially planted memorial garden at the family home. After Sid's death in 2015, the ashes were transferred to Bentley's mother, Jill.

== Media coverage ==
Media coverage of the case was extensive, making it one of the most high-profile unsolved crimes in New Zealand history. At the time, all major news outlets in New Zealand closely followed the case. The intensity of the coverage was both a help and a hindrance to the investigation. For instance, the men who found her body cited seeing Bentley's mother on evening news television broadcasts as the reason they had decided to come forward, despite the fact they were engaged in an illegal activity when they found her.

However, the relationship between the media and the police and family was also strained at times. Decisions by media to publish reports that Bentley's body had been discovered before she had been formally identified were publicly criticised by police. In addition, the family expressed distress at the pressure they received from media during the several days that Bentley's body remained formally unidentified.

== Suspects ==
Police have stated that hundreds of individuals have been considered suspects at one time or another, and a list of several hundred people have never been formally eliminated from the enquiry. At times the list of suspects has been as small as 20 people. Some possible suspects have received media attention in relation to the case.

=== Sid and John Bentley ===
At an early stage in the case, media reported that Sid and John were considered suspects in Kirsty's disappearance. Both denied any involvement, although John acknowledged in media interviews that it was only common sense that police should consider them as suspects. Police later confirmed that they were considered suspects in the investigation.

Police conducted a scene examination at the family home in the early stages of the investigation, including carrying out Luminol testing. However the tests did not find anything of value to the investigation.

Sid was unable to provide a strong alibi for his whereabouts on that day. He initially claimed he had been in Christchurch and Lyttelton at the time, but later claimed he had hit his head on a cupboard door and forgotten that he had actually been in Ashburton for part of the day. His exact whereabouts at the time remain unknown. Family members have stated they believe Sid was embarrassed to admit whatever it was that he was doing on that day, but they do not believe he was involved in the murder in any way.

Police later consulted retired British Detective Inspector Chuck Burton, who stated that in his opinion, the perpetrator was likely to have known Bentley and been close with her, based on the nature of the crime and the way her body was left at Camp Gully.

Despite this, police never laid charges against either Sid or John, suggesting no strong evidence of their involvement was ever found. In 2018, Police confirmed they do not believe Sid or John were involved in the crime.

=== Green van ===
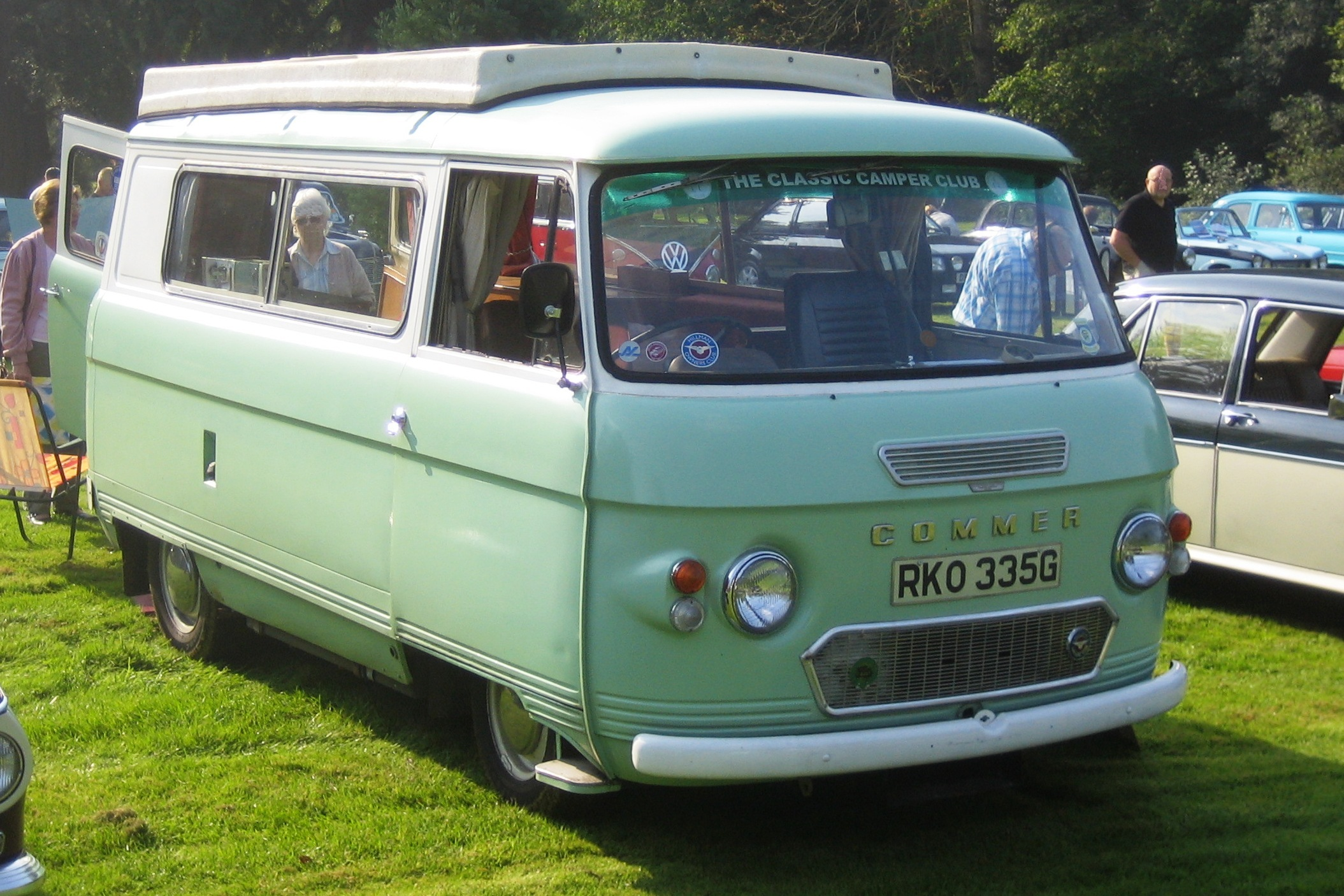
Green 1960s Commer camper van similar to the one of interest to the police

In the months after Bentley's death, Police asked the public for information about a green Commer van, registration number EP9888, that was of interest to the inquiry. The van was described as a 1961 model set up to be used as a camper, with a distinctive Commer branding badge attached to the front. The van was either blue or a faded blue-green. It was last registered with the NZTA in 1995. This type of van was commonly used by tourists and drifters at the time, and in many cases these vehicles were not registered. The van was rare; as few as 2 matching its general description are believed to have ever been in New Zealand.

An experienced mechanic originally reported the van to police after seeing it in the area around the time of Bentley's disappearance. Due to the distinctive nature of the van and the man's experience with them, he took special note of the van at the time and was able to give a highly detailed description of it. The van was also seen by other witnesses in the Ashburton area in the weeks before Bentley's disappearance, and there were reports it was also seen in the Camp Gully area.

Police believed that such a distinctive vehicle could not go unnoticed by the public, and a sighting could lead to a break in the case. Many people came forward to police with possible sightings, but all were discounted as not being the van that police were seeking; the distinctive nature of the van made it very easy for them to rule out mistaken sightings. No further leads on the camper were ever revealed, and it has never been found.

In addition to this, police distributed fliers asking for information on a girl seen near the van on Chalmers Avenue, close to where Bentley had disappeared. The girl was known to the dairy owners in the suburb of Netherby as a customer. However, despite this, and repeated public requests by police, the girl never came forward. Her identity and her connection to the suspicious van remains unknown.

=== Russell John Tully ===
In March 2017, media reported that police were investigating whether Russell John Tully, a local man who murdered two staff members at the Ashburton Work and Income office in 2014, may have been involved. Tully had been known to camp in the area of Ashburton from which Kirsty went missing. Tully strongly denied any involvement.

In May 2018 Police announced they had eliminated Tully from the enquiry. He had provided a detailed account of where he had been living and working during the time Bentley disappeared. Police confirmed he had not originally been interviewed because he was living in Nelson at the time, and was no longer suspected of any involvement.

=== Others ===
After Sid's death in 2015, an unidentified woman came forward to say that she suspected her ex-boyfriend had been involved in the murder. He had been a suspect in the original investigation, and they had both been interviewed by police and media at the time in relation to the case. According to an interview with her in 2015, her ex-boyfriend, while intoxicated, had admitted his involvement to her on several occasions. It is unclear whether she ever came forward to formally change her statement to police.

== Recent developments ==
In 2014 the case was transferred from Detective Inspector Greg Williams to Detective Inspector Greg Murton. At the time he commented that the investigation was open and would continue to be until it was resolved.

In 2015 Bentley's father, Sid, died of esophageal cancer. His death briefly renewed public interest in the case.

In 2018, Police confirmed that Russell John Tully was no longer of interest to the enquiry.

In late 2018, nearly 20 years after the disappearance, Detective Inspector Murton announced that there had been advances in DNA testing that he hoped could lead to a break in the case. Items of evidence including the dog lead and underwear have been submitted for further testing at Environmental Science and Research.

The case is still under active investigation, with Detective Inspector Murton stating in 2018 that "the case is still open and being investigated."

In July 2022 the New Zealand police offered a $100,000 reward for information or evidence leading to the identify and conviction of the person or people responsible for her death.

== See also ==
- List of solved missing person cases: 1950–1999
- List of unsolved murders (1980–1999)
