= National Catholic Community Service =

The National Catholic Community Service (NCCS) was formed in the United States in 1940 and ceased operations in 1980. Its purpose was to serve the spiritual, social, educational, and recreational needs of Catholic military personnel and civilian defense workers and their families. It was a member agency of the United Service Organization (USO) and the Veterans Administration's (VA) Voluntary Service National Advisory Committee and operated a VA Hospital Program with the assistance of a VA diocesan hospital committee.

== See also ==
- United States Conference of Catholic Bishops #National Catholic War Council
- Roman Catholic Archdiocese for the Military Services, USA
