= John Bentley (harpsichordist) =

English harpsichordist and office holder

John Bentley (c. 1756 – 10 November 1813) was an English harpsichordist who was known in North America by the end of the American Revolution.

Bentley's musical career first brought him notability in Philadelphia where he founded the City Concerts. He formed a lasting connection with Quebec where he lived for 25 years. He held important positions there, the most notable being the overseer of roads. His main interest was music, and he should be considered an important part of Quebec's and Philadelphia's musical history.
