= Michael Bentley =

Michael Bentley may refer to:

- Michael Bentley (cricketer) (born 1934), former English cricketer
- Michael Bentley (historian) (born 1948), English historian of British politics
