= Daniel S. Bentley =

American minister, writer, newspaper founder (1850–1916)

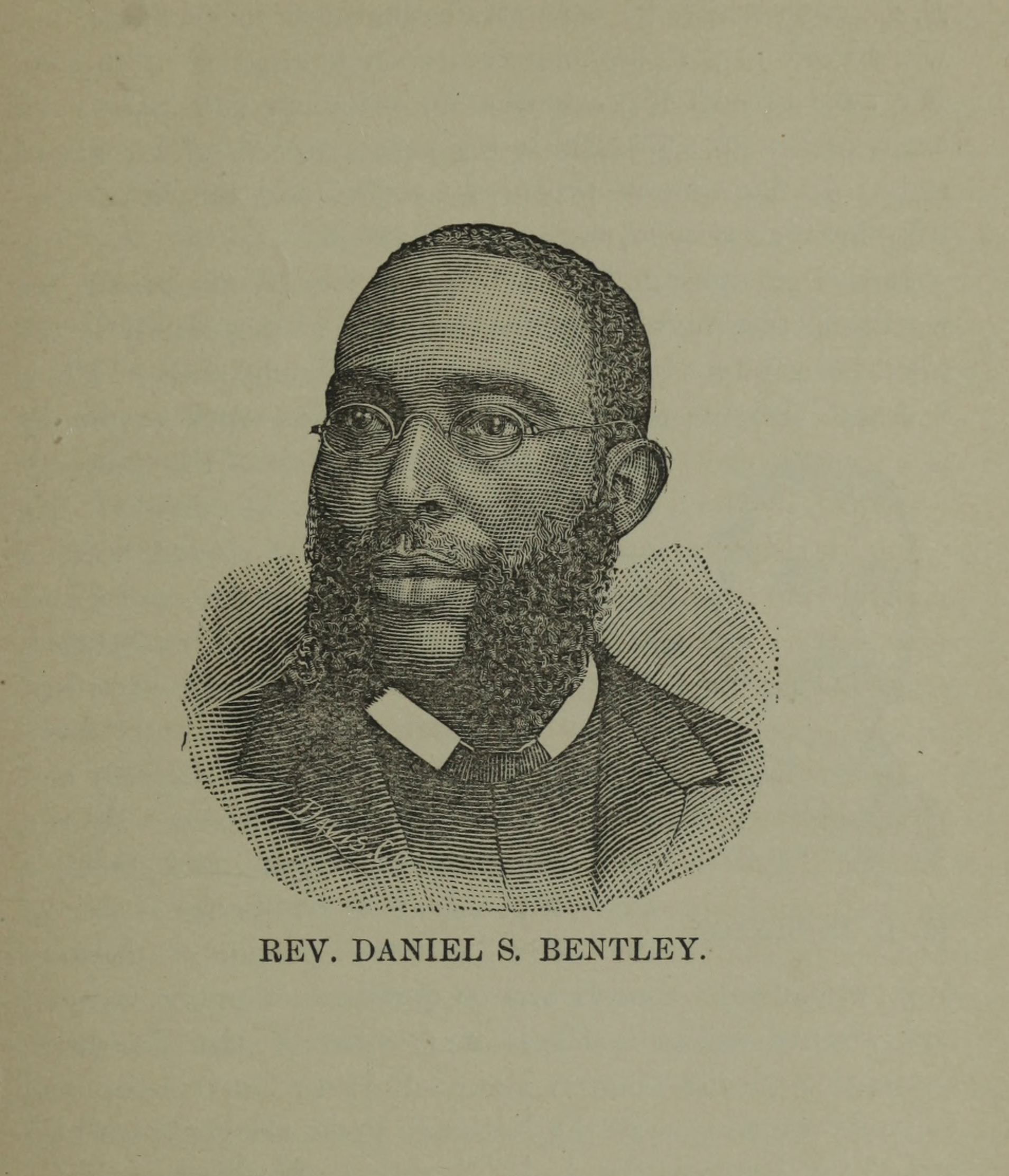
- Born: 1850; Madison County, Kentucky, U.S.
- Died: November 12, 1916 November 12, 1916 (aged 65–66); McKeesport, Pennsylvania, U.S.
- Education: Berea College, Presbyterian Theological Seminary, Livingstone College
- Occupation(s): Minister, writer, newspaper proprietor

Rev. Daniel S. Bentley (1850–1916), was an American minister, writer, and newspaper proprietor. He was the founder of the Pittsburgh-based, Afro-American Spokesman newspaper.

== Biography ==
Daniel S. Bentley was born in 1850 in Madison County, Kentucky. As a teenager he attended Berea College. He was baptized Christian by John Gregg Fee, the founder of Berea College; and by 1869, he started preaching in Danville, Kentucky. He continued his education at Danville Presbyterian Theological Seminary.

For 14 years he led churches in Louisville and Frankfort. From 1884 to 1887, Bentley worked in Indiana; followed by a move to Pittsburgh to led the Bethel A.M.E. Church on Wylie Avenue. He founded the Afro-American Spokesman newspaper in Pittsburgh, for which he also wrote articles. Rev. George W. Clinton (1859–1922) had served as the newspaper editor. Bentley was also the president of the Spokesman Stock Company, which owned his newspaper. He was profiled in the book, The Afro-American Press and Its Editors (1891).

He authored the short book, Brief Religious Reflections (1900). He received a PhD in divinity studies at Livingstone College.

Bentley died on November 12, 1916, in McKeesport, Pennsylvania, while he was on the pulpit at the St. Paul A.M.E. Church.

== See also ==
- List of African-American newspapers in Pennsylvania
