= Bently Nob Hill =

- Interactive map of the Bently Nob Hill area
- Alternative names: 1360 Jones Street

General information
- Type: Residential Apartments
- Architectural style: Art Deco
- Location: Nob Hill, San Francisco, 1360 Jones Street, San Francisco, California, United States
- Coordinates: 37°47′38.73″N 122°24′52.20″W
- Elevation: 125 ft
- Current tenants: Residential
- Renovated: 2005
- Owner: Bently Holdings
- Landlord: Bently Holdings

Technical details
- Floor count: 10
- Floor area: 32,000 sq ft

Design and construction
- Architect: William E. Schirmer

Website
- http://bentlynobhill.com/index.php

The Bently Nob Hill is an apartment building situated on the highest point of the Nob Hill, San Francisco neighborhood. The tower was designed by residential architect William E. Schirmer in 1924; it was inspired by Spanish and Moorish architecture and built in the Art deco architectural style of the 1920s. The structure's slender water tower pavilion is directly modeled after the Royal Palace in Marrakesh.

The building is a San Francisco landmark and one of the most prominent in the Nob Hill neighborhood.

Bently Nob Hill is 10 stories high and contains 32,000 square feet (3,000 m^{2}) of one and two bedroom apartments.
