= Nancy Bentley =

American academic

- Spouse: Karl T. Ulrich (married)
- Children: 2

Academic background
- Education: B.A., Brigham Young University; M.A., PhD., English Literature, 1988, Harvard University
- Thesis: Contrary dictions: narrative technique and cultural conflict in antebellum American writing

Academic work
- Institutions: University of Pennsylvania

Nancy Ann Bentley is the Donald T. Regan Professor of English at the University of Pennsylvania.

== Education ==
Bentley earned her Bachelor of Arts from Brigham Young University (BYU) and her Master's degree and PhD from Harvard University. While at BYU, she was a member of Phi Eta Sigma.

== Career ==
In 1994, Bentley published her first book "The Ethnography of Manners" through the Cambridge University Press. In 1995, she was promoted to assistant professor of English. The next year, she was the recipient of the Beinecke Rare Book and Manuscript Library John D. and Rose H. Jackson Fellowship.

In 1999, she was promoted to associate professor of English. She took an academic leave of absence in 2004. As an associate professor, she was the recipient of the 2007 Lindback Award for excellence in teaching. In 2009, she was elected to a three-year term on the Senate Committee on Academic Freedom and Responsibility. That year, she also published Frantic Panoramas: American Literature and Mass Culture 1870-1920.

From 2010 until 2014, Bentley sat on the American Literature Section as a chair and member of the advisory council. She also sat on the editorial board of The Journal of Nineteenth-Century Americanists and American Literary History. In April 2017, Bentley was named the Donald T. Regan Professor of English.

== Personal life ==
She is married to fellow University of Pennsylvania professor, Karl Ulrich, and they have two sons together.
