= Julie London discography =

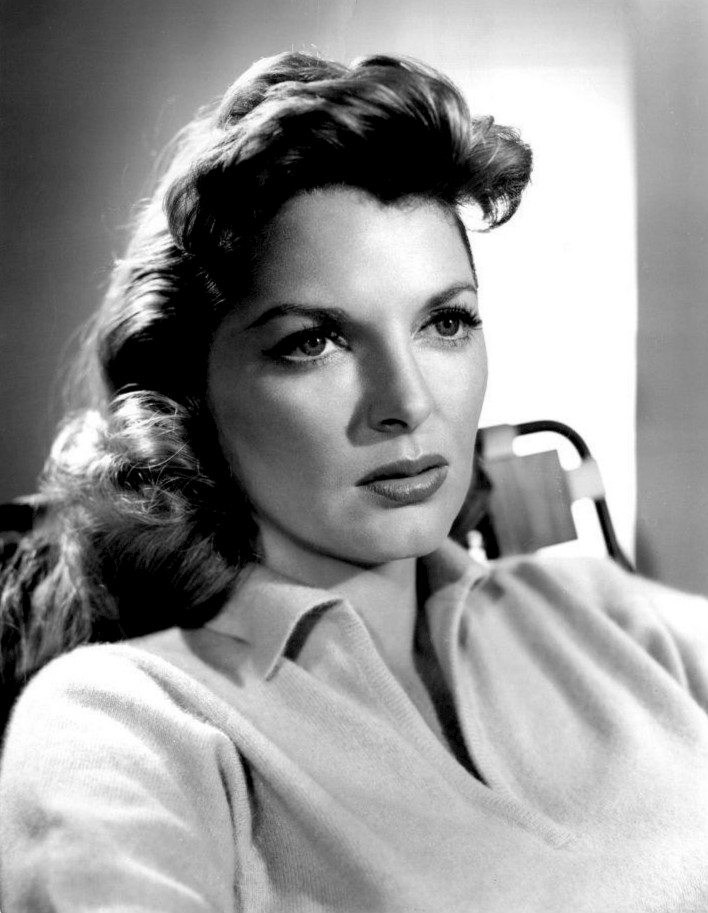
- Julie London in 1958
- Studio albums: 29
- Live albums: 1
- Compilation albums: 5
- Singles: 29
- Other albums: 2

The discography of American jazz singer Julie London consists of 29 studio albums, one live album, six compilation albums, two additional albums, and 29 singles. After a moderately successful film career, London signed a recording contract with the newly formed Liberty Records in 1955. Her debut single "Cry Me a River" reached number nine on the Billboard Hot 100 in 1955. In June 1957, it also peaked at number twenty-two on the UK Singles Chart. "Cry Me a River" became London's most successful and highest-selling single of her musical career. The single sold three million copies in total. Her debut studio album Julie Is Her Name was issued in December 1955 and reached the second position on the Billboard 200 albums chart. London's next three studio releases, Lonely Girl (1956), Calendar Girl (1956), and About the Blues (1957), reached the top-twenty of the Billboard 200 survey as well.

Although London did not have further single chart success, she continued releasing album material. Her 1950s studio albums received attention due to the sexuality of her album covers as well as the quality of her music. This can be seen on the covers of Make Love to Me (1957) and London by Night (1958). In 1959 she recorded two studio albums of traditional pop material: Swing Me an Old Song and Your Number Please. In 1960 she recorded a studio album at her home in California entitled Julie...At Home. London's 1961 studio album Whatever Julie Wants featured her naked, wearing a fur coat over her body. Her nineteenth studio record The End of the World (1963) became her first in six years to chart the Billboard 200, reaching the one hundred twenty seventh position. The Wonderful World of Julie London, her twentieth studio release, also reached the Billboard 200 chart. London issued her first live album in 1964 titled In Person at the Americana. In 1965 she released an album of music dedicated to Cole Porter. London continued recording for the Liberty label until 1969. She released her final studio album Yummy, Yummy, Yummy in 1968. The title track also became London's final appearance on a Billboard chart, reaching the twenty fifth position on the Bubbling Under Hot 100 singles chart.

== Albums ==
=== Studio albums ===
List of studio albums, showing selected chart positions and other relevant details
Title	Album details	Peak chart positions	
Title	Album details	US	CAN
Julie Is Her Name	Released: December 1955; Label: Liberty; Formats: Vinyl, CD, music download	2	—
Lonely Girl	Released: 1956; Label: Liberty; Formats: Vinyl, CD, music download	16	—
Calendar Girl	Released: 1956; Label: Liberty; Formats: Vinyl, CD, music download	18	—
About the Blues	Released: 1957; Label: Liberty; Formats: Vinyl, CD, music download	15	—
Make Love to Me	Released: 1957; Label: Liberty; Formats: Vinyl, CD, music download	—	—
Julie	Released: 1957; Label: Liberty; Formats: Vinyl, CD, music download	—	—
Julie Is Her Name, Volume II	Released: 1958; Label: Liberty; Formats: Vinyl, CD, music download	—	—
London by Night	Released: 1958; Label: Liberty; Formats: Vinyl, CD, music download	—	—
Swing Me an Old Song	Released: 1959; Label: Liberty; Formats: Vinyl, CD, music download	—	—
Your Number Please	Released: 1959; Label: Liberty; Formats: Vinyl, CD, music download	—	—
Julie...At Home	Released: 1960; Label: Liberty; Formats: Vinyl, CD, music download	—	—
Around Midnight	Released: 1960; Label: Liberty; Formats: Vinyl, CD, music download	—	—
Send for Me	Released: 1961; Label: Liberty; Formats: Vinyl, CD, music download	—	—
Whatever Julie Wants	Released: 1961; Label: Liberty; Formats: Vinyl, CD, music download	—	—
Sophisticated Lady	Released: 1962; Label: Liberty; Formats: Vinyl, CD, music download	—	—
Love Letters	Released: 1962; Label: Liberty; Formats: Vinyl, CD, music download	—	—
Love on the Rocks	Released: 1963; Label: Liberty; Formats: Vinyl, CD, music download	—	—
Latin in a Satin Mood	Released: 1963; Label: Liberty; Formats: Vinyl, CD, music download	—	—
The End of the World	Released: 1963; Label: Liberty; Formats: Vinyl, CD, music download	127	—
The Wonderful World of Julie London	Released: 1963; Label: Liberty; Formats: Vinyl, CD, music download	136	—
You Don't Have to Be a Baby to Cry	Released: 1964; Label: Liberty; Formats: Vinyl, CD, music download	—	—
Our Fair Lady	Released: 1965; Label: Liberty; Formats: Vinyl, CD, music download	—	11
Feeling Good	Released: 1965; Label: Liberty; Formats: Vinyl, CD, music download	—	—
All Through the Night: Julie London Sings the Choicest of Cole Porter	Released: 1965; Label: Liberty; Formats: Vinyl, CD, music download	—	—
For the Night People	Released: 1966; Label: Liberty; Formats: Vinyl, CD, music download	—	—
Nice Girls Don't Stay for Breakfast	Released: 1967; Label: Liberty; Formats: Vinyl, CD, music download	—	—
With Body & Soul	Released: 1967; Label: Liberty; Formats: Vinyl, CD, music download	—	—
Easy Does It	Released: 1968; Label: Liberty; Formats: Vinyl, CD, music download	—	—
Yummy, Yummy, Yummy	Released: 1969; Label: Liberty; Formats: Vinyl, CD, music download	—	—
"—" denotes a recording that did not chart or was not released in that territory.

=== Extended play ===
List of EP's, showing relevant details
Title	Album details"
Julie London	Released: March 2, 1955; Label: Bethlehem; Formats: Vinyl, music download
Julie Is Her Name (Part One)	Released: 1955; Label: Liberty; Formats: Vinyl, music download
Julie Is Her Name (Part Two)	Released: 1955; Label: Liberty; Formats: Vinyl, music download
Julie Is Her Name (Part Three)	Released: 1955; Label: Liberty; Formats: Vinyl, music download
Cry Me a River	Released: 1956; Label: Liberty; Formats: Vinyl, music download
Lonely Girl (Part One)	Released: 1956; Label: Liberty; Formats: Vinyl, music download
Lonely Girl (Part Two)	Released: 1956; Label: Liberty; Formats: Vinyl, music download
Lonely Girl (Part Three)	Released: 1956; Label: Liberty; Formats: Vinyl, music download
Calendar Girl (Part One)	Released: 1956; Label: Liberty; Formats: Vinyl, music download
Calendar Girl (Part Two)	Released: 1956; Label: Liberty; Formats: Vinyl, music download
Calendar Girl (Part Three)	Released: 1956; Label: Liberty; Formats: Vinyl, music download
About the Blues (Part One)	Released: 1957; Label: Liberty; Formats: Vinyl, music download
About the Blues (Part Two)	Released: 1957; Label: Liberty; Formats: Vinyl, music download
About the Blues (Part Three)	Released: 1957; Label: Liberty; Formats: Vinyl, music download
Julie Sings Film Songs	Released: 1957; Label: London Records; Formats: Vinyl, music download
Make Love to Me (Part One)	Released: 1958; Label: London Records; Formats: Vinyl, music download
Make Love to Me (Part Two)	Released: 1958; Label: London Records; Formats: Vinyl, music download
Make Love to Me (Part Three)	Released: 1958; Label: London Records; Formats: Vinyl, music download
Julie (Part One)	Released: 1959; Label: London Records; Formats: Vinyl, music download
Julie (Part Two)	Released: 1959; Label: London Records; Formats: Vinyl, music download
Julie (Part Three)	Released: 1959; Label: London Records; Formats: Vinyl, music download

=== Other albums ===
List of other albums, showing relevant details
Title	Album details
In Person at the Americana	Released: 1964; Label: Liberty; Formats: Vinyl, CD, music download
By Myself	Released: 1965; Label: Liberty; Formats: Vinyl

=== Compilation albums ===
List of compilation albums, showing relevant details
Title	Album details
The Best of Julie	Released: 1962; Label: Liberty; Formats: Vinyl
The Very Best of Julie London	Released: 1975; Label: EMI; Formats: Vinyl, CD, music download
Time for Love: The Best of Julie London	Released: February 1, 1991; Label: Rhino; Formats: Cassette, CD
Ultra Lounge: Wild, Cool & Swingin' – The Artist Collection Vol. 5	Released: June 29, 1999; Label: Capitol; Formats: CD, music download
The Very Best of Julie London	Released: 2005; Label: EMI (Europe) / Capitol (USA); Formats: CD(x2), music download
The Ultimate Collection	Released: July 10, 2006; Label: EMI; Formats: CD

== Singles ==
=== As lead artist ===
List of singles, with selected chart positions, showing other relevant details
Year	Title	Peak chart positions				Album
Year	Title	US	US AC	ITA	UK	Album
1955	"Cry Me a River"	9	—	46	22	Julie Is Her Name
1955	"Baby, Baby, All the Time"	—	—	—	—	About the Blues
1956	"Lonely Girl"	—	—	—	—	Lonely Girl
1956	"Tall Boy"	—	—	—	—	Non-album tracks
1957	"The Meaning of the Blues"	—	—	—	—	About the Blues
1957	"Dark"	—	—	—	—	
1957	"I'd Like You For Christmas" (with the Johnny Mann Singers)	—	—	—	—	
1958	"It's Easy"	—	—	—	—	
1958	"Blue Moon"	—	—	—	—	Julie Is Her Name, Volume II
1959	"My Strange Affair"	—	—	—	—	Non-album track
1959	"Must Be Catchin'"	—	—	—	—	Julie's Golden Greats
1959	"Makin' Whoopee"	—	—	—	—	Your Number Please
1959	"Cry Me a River"	—	—	—	—	Julie Is Her Name
1960	"In the Wee Small Hours of the Morning"	—	—	—	—	Around Midnight
1961	"Send for Me"	—	—	—	—	Send for Me
1961	"Sanctuary"	—	—	—	—	Non-album tracks
1961	"My Darling, My Darling"	—	—	—	—	Non-album tracks
1962	"Desafinado"	110	—	—	—	The End of the World
1963	"I'm Coming Back to You"	118	—	—	—	The Wonderful World of Julie London
1964	"I Want to Find Out for Myself"	—	—	—	—	Julie London
1964	"The Boy from Ipanema"	—	—	—	—	Non-album tracks
1964	"You're Free to Go"	—	—	—	—	Non-album tracks
1965	"Girl Talk"	—	—	—	—	Feeling Good
1966	"Won't You Come Home Bill Bailey"	—	—	—	—	For the Night People
1967	"Mickey Mouse March"	—	—	—	—	Nice Girls Don't Stay for Breakfast
1968	"Yummy Yummy Yummy"	125	—	—	—	Yummy, Yummy, Yummy
1968	"Louie Louie"	—	—	—	—	Yummy, Yummy, Yummy
1969	"Too Much of a Man"	—	—	—	—	Non-album tracks
1969	"Like to Get to Know You"	—	15	—	—	Yummy, Yummy, Yummy
"—" denotes a recording that did not chart or was not released in that territory.
