= Our Fair Lady =

Studio album by Julie London
- Released: 1965
- Recorded: October 9–10, 1964 (Tracks 3–5, 8)
- Studio: RCA, Hollywood
- Genre: Traditional pop, vocal jazz
- Label: Liberty
- Producer: Snuff Garrett

Julie London chronology
| In Person at the Americana (1964) | Our Fair Lady (1965) | Feeling Good (1965) |

Professional ratings
Review scores
| Source | Rating |
|---|---|
| Record Mirror | 3/5 stars |

Our Fair Lady is an LP album by Julie London, released by Liberty Records under catalog number LRP-3392 as a monophonic recording and catalog number LST-7392 in stereo in 1965.

Most of the material had been previously released. Tracks 3–5 & 8 were the only new songs, recorded October 9–10, 1964, in sessions arranged by Richard Wess. According to London biographer Michael Owen, an additional song, "House Where Love Is," was recorded at the October 9–10 sessions and "presumably remains in the vaults."

== Track listing ==
1. "The Days of Wine and Roses" (Henry Mancini, Johnny Mercer)–2:49
2. "Call Me Irresponsible" (Jimmy Van Heusen, Sammy Cahn)–2:46
3. "Theme from Summer Place" (Max Steiner, Mack Discant)–2:16
4. "As Time Goes By" (Herman Hupfeld)–3:07
5. "More (Theme from Mondo Cane)" (Riz Ortolani, Nino Oliviero, Norman Newell)–2:35
6. "Charade" (Henry Mancini, Johnny Mercer)–2:25
7. "Never On Sunday" (Manos Hadjidakis, Billy Towne)–2:20
8. "An Affair to Remember" (Harry Warren, Leo McCarey, Harold Adamson)–2:50
9. "Wives and Lovers" (Burt Bacharach, Hal David)–2:39
10. "Fascination" (Fermo Dante Marchetti, Maurice de Féraudy, Dick Manning)–1:57
11. "Boy on a Dolphin" (Takis Morakis, Jean Fermanoglou, Paul Francis Webster)–2:06
12. "The Second Time Around" (Jimmy Van Heusen, Sammy Cahn)–3:00
- Tracks 1, 2 from The End of the World
- Tracks 6, 9 from Julie London
- Tracks 7, 10, 12 from Love Letters
- Track 11 from 1957 single

== Selected personnel (Oct 1964 session) ==
- Julie London - vocals
- Gene Cipriano - oboe
- Paul Horn - flute
- Ernie Freeman - piano
- Tommy Allsup - guitar
- John Gray - guitar
- Red Callender - double bass
- Earl Palmer - drums
- Julius Wechter - percussion
- Richard Wess - arranger
- David Hassinger - engineer
