= Royal Box =

Royal Box may refer to:

- Royal Box, Centre Court, a seating area of the Centre Court tennis court at Wimbledon, London
- The Royal Box (New York City nightclub) - a supper club which existed at the Americana Hotel, New York City from 1962 to 1979
- The Royal Box (Paris nightclub) - a supper club in Paris, see Joe Zelli
- The Royal Box (film), 1929 film directed by Bryan Foy

== See also ==
- Box (theatre)
