= Make Love to Me =

Make Love to Me may refer to:

- Make Love to Me (album), a 1957 LP album by Julie London
- "Make Love to Me" (1941 song)
- "Make Love to Me" (1954 song)
- Love Me (1942 film), a 1942 German film also known by this title
