= Faithfully (Johnny Mathis album) =

Studio album by Johnny Mathis
- Released: December 21, 1959
- Recorded: November 4–6, 1959
- Genre: Vocal
- Length: 45:33
- Label: Columbia
- Producer: Mitch Miller

Johnny Mathis chronology
Heavenly (1959)	Faithfully (1959)	Johnny's Mood (1960)

Singles from Faithfully
- 1. "Maria" Released: May 9, 1960

Faithfully is an album by American pop singer Johnny Mathis that was released on December 21, 1959, by Columbia Records and continues his trend toward covering ballads alongside an orchestra. While his previous LPs usually offered one or two songs that had not been previously recorded, that number on this project leaped to five, and although the other seven selections were established by other artists, even some of those were lesser-known, such as Jeri Southern's number 30 pop hit "You Better Go Now" and the title song from the 1953 film The Blue Gardenia.

The album made its first appearance on Billboard magazine's album chart in the issue dated January 18, 1960, and reached number two during its 75 weeks there. it also debuted on the Cashbox albums chart in the issue dated January 6, 1960, and remained on the chart for the totals of 70 weeks, peaking at number two. It received Gold certification from the Recording Industry Association of America for sales of 500,000 copies in the US on December 4, 1962.

The Mathis recording of the West Side Story number "Maria" was released as a single on two occasions. The first came five months after Faithfully hit store shelves and included four weeks on the Billboard Hot 100 that began in the issue dated May 30 and led to a number 78 peak position. and number 50 on the Cashbox singles chart during its seven weeks there. The second followed the 1961 release of the film version of West Side Story and resulted in a number 88 showing during its three weeks on that same chart in December of that year.

Faithfully was released for the first time on compact disc on June 21, 2002, as one of two albums on one CD, the other LP being his 1960 follow-up Johnny's Mood. Faithfully was also included in Legacy's Mathis box set The Voice of Romance: The Columbia Original Album Collection, which was released on December 8, 2017.

== Reception ==
Professional ratings
Review scores
Source	Rating
Billboard	positive
The Encyclopedia of Popular Music	4/5 stars

Billboard wrote, "The arrangements by Glenn Osser are lush and warm, and Mathis has never been in better voice."

Cashbox says "A beautiful collection of ballads rendered in the sensitive Mathis style that points up another twelve reasons for Mathis’ stature as one of our top disk artists."

== Track listing ==
=== Side one ===
1. "Faithfully" (Burt Bacharach, Sidney Shaw) – 2:37
2. "Tonight" from West Side Story (Leonard Bernstein, Stephen Sondheim) – 3:15
3. "Nobody Knows (How Much I Love You)" (Bart Howard) – 4:14
4. "One Starry Night" (Abner Silver, Sid Wayne) – 4:23
5. "Follow Me" (Kay Thompson) – 3:24
6. "You Better Go Now" (Irvin Graham, Bickley Reichner) – 4:14

=== Side two ===
1. "Secret Love" from Calamity Jane (Paul Francis Webster, Sammy Fain) – 3:33
2. "Maria" from West Side Story (Bernstein, Sondheim) – 3:50
3. "Where Do You Think You're Going" (Bart Howard) – 4:04
4. "And This Is My Beloved" from Kismet (Bob Wright, George Forrest) – 4:01
5. "Where Are You" from Top of the Town (Harold Adamson, Jimmy McHugh) – 3:31
6. "Blue Gardenia" from The Blue Gardenia (Lester Lee, Bob Russell) – 4:27

== Recording dates ==
From the liner notes for The Voice of Romance: The Columbia Original Album Collection:

- November 4, 1959 – "Blue Gardenia", "Secret Love", "Where Are You", "You Better Go Now"
- November 5, 1959 – "And This Is My Beloved", "Nobody Knows (How Much I Love You)", "One Starry Night", "Where Do You Think You're Going"
- November 6, 1959 – "Faithfully", "Follow Me", "Maria", "Tonight"

== Personnel ==
- Johnny Mathis – vocals
- Mitch Miller – producer
- Glenn Osser – arranger and conductor
- Bob Cato – photography

== Bibliography ==
- Whitburn, Joel (1994), Joel Whitburn's Pop Hits, 1940-1954, Record Research Inc., ISBN 0898201063
- Whitburn, Joel (2009), Joel Whitburn's Top Pop Singles, 1955-2008, Record Research Inc., ISBN 0898201802
- Whitburn, Joel (2010), Joel Whitburn Presents Top Pop Albums, Seventh Edition, Record Research Inc., ISBN 0-89820-183-7
- Hoffmann, Frank W (1988), The Cash box album charts, 1955-1974, Scarecrow Press, ISBN 0-810-82005-6
- Downey, Pat (1994), Cash box pop singles charts, 1950-1993, Libraries Unlimited, ISBN 1-56308-316-7
