= Send for Me =

Send for Me may refer to:

- Send for Me (album), 1961 album by Julie London
- "Send for Me" (song), 1957 single by Nat King Cole
- "Send for Me", song by the National from the album First Two Pages of Frankenstein
- "Send for Me", song by Atlantic Starr from the album Radiant
