= The Best of Julie =

Greatest hits album by Julie London
- Released: 1962
- Genre: Traditional pop
- Label: Liberty

Julie London chronology
Whatever Julie Wants (1961)	The Best of Julie (1962)	Sophisticated Lady (1962)

The Best of Julie is an LP album by Julie London, released by Liberty Records under catalog number L-5501 in 1962.

== Track listing ==
Track number	Title	Songwriter(s)	Time
1	"Cry Me a River"	Arthur Hamilton	2:36
2	"Moments Like This"	Frank Loesser, Burton Lane	2:38
3	"Hot Toddy"	Ralph Flanagan, Herb Hendler	1:45
4	"They Can't Take That Away From Me"	George Gershwin, Ira Gershwin	3:06
5	"June in January"	Ralph Rainger, Leo Robin	2:05
6	"Mad About the Boy"	Noël Coward	2:09
7	"Don't Smoke in Bed"	Willard Robison	2:17
8	"Gee, Baby, Ain't I Good to You"	Andy Razaf, Don Redman	1:52
9	"Cuddle up a Little Closer"	Karl Hoschna, Otto Harbach	2:08
10	"Invitation to the Blues"	Doris Fisher, Arthur Gershwin, Allan Roberts	2:47
11	"You'd Be So Nice to Come Home To"	Cole Porter	2:13
12	"The Nearness of You"	Hoagy Carmichael, Ned Washington	2:20
13	"Daddy"	Bobby Troup	2:13
