= Mad About the Boy (song) =

1932 song composed by Noël Coward

Song by Joyce Barbour, Steffi Duna, Norah Howard, Doris Hare
- Published: 1932
- Songwriter: Noël Coward

"Mad About the Boy" is a popular song with lyrics and music by actor and playwright Noël Coward. It was introduced in the 1932 revue Words and Music by Joyce Barbour, Steffi Duna, Norah Howard and Doris Hare. The song deals with the theme of unrequited love for a film star. It was written to be sung by female characters, although Coward (who was a gay man) also wrote a version which was never performed, containing references to the then-risqué topic of homosexual love. The song gained new popularity in 1992 when Dinah Washington's rendition was used in the Levi's television advertisement "Swimmer", directed by Tarsem Singh.

== Lyrics ==
Nöel Coward's lyrics for the song express the adulation of a matinee idol by a number of women as they queue outside a cinema, and is sung by several female characters in turn. The adoring fans sing of their love for their hero:

On the silver screen
He melts my foolish heart in every single scene (original version)

Coward later wrote additional verses for the New York production, to be sung by a male character. The lyrics make explicit reference to homosexual feelings with lines such as:

When I told my wife
She said "I've never heard such nonsense in my life!" (Broadway version)

The lyrics also make camp humorous reference to the supposed effeminacy of the character, who is likened to the contemporary film actress Myrna Loy, and to his repeated unsuccessful attempts at conversion therapy with his psychiatrist. The verses were never performed, as the management thought them too risqué.

"The boy" was rumoured to be actor Douglas Fairbanks Jr, who, according to an American newspaper years later, "Noel loved...[but] Doug definitely didn't love him back, although the two men became good friends." Another Hollywood star, Tyrone Power, has also been the rumoured subject of the song.

== Dinah Washington version ==
"Mad About the Boy"

Single by Dinah Washington
- Released: 1992
- Recorded: 1961
- Genre: Jazz, easy listening, traditional pop
- Length: 2:47
- Label: Mercury
- Songwriter: Noël Coward
- Producer: Quincy Jones

Dinah Washington recorded the song twice: firstly, on 24 March 1952 with orchestral accompaniment by Walter Roddell, and then on 4 December 1961 with Quincy Jones and his orchestra. Her 1961 recording is possibly the most widely known version of the song. The 6/8 time arrangement for voice and jazz orchestra by Jones omits two verses and was recorded in the singer's native Chicago on the Mercury label.

Her 1952 version was released as a single, but the 1961 version was not given a single release until 1992. The song was one of the 40 songs she recorded with Quincy Jones in 1961. Some of these were issued on two albums: I Wanna Be Loved and Tears and Laughter, both released in 1962. The song "Tears And Laughter" was released as a single, but "Mad About the Boy" remained unreleased until Golden Hits – Volume One, a 1963 compilation. By that point, Washington had moved from the Mercury label to Roulette. The recording was also issued on other Washington compilations.

Washington's version was popularised for a new generation when it was used as a backing track in a 1992 television advertisement for Levi's jeans. In the commercial, which is influenced by the 1968 Burt Lancaster film The Swimmer, a young man runs through an American suburban neighbourhood stripping down to only his jeans, invades private gardens and dives into a series of swimming pools to shrink his jeans. Washington's recording was re-released by Mercury as a tie-in in with the advertising campaign, and the cover art featured a shot of the shirtless man emerging from a swimming pool and bore the Levi's logo. The single entered the Top 50 in the UK Singles Chart.

== Other recordings ==
- Noël Coward with orchestra conducted by Ray Noble in London on 20 September 1932. The recording was not issued at the time, but has subsequently been included on CD collections.
- Caro Emerald with Jools Holland's Rhythm and Blues Orchestra on the album The Golden Age of Song (2012).
- Patti Page on the album The Waltz Queen
- Jessica Biel on the soundtrack for the film Easy Virtue (adapted from the Noël Coward play)
- Helen Forrest in 1949, later used in the video game Fallout: New Vegas

The song has been performed by a number of other artists, including:

- Belle Baker
- Georgia Brown – Georgia Brown (1963)
- Yul Brynner, in drag, in the 1969 film The Magic Christian (dubbed by Miriam Karlin).
- Blossom Dearie
- Buddy DeFranco
- Marianne Faithfull
- Frances Faye
- Maria Friedman
- Jackie Gleason
- Gogi Grant
- Glen Gray and the Casa Loma Orchestra
- Joyce Grenfell
- Lena Horne
- Greta Keller
- Eartha Kitt
- Cleo Laine
- Gertrude Lawrence
- Amanda Lear – Let Me Entertain You (2016)
- Beatrice Lillie
- Julie London – London by Night (1958)
- Andrea Marcovicci
- Billy May – The Ultimate (2002)
- Marian McPartland – At the Hickory House (1996)
- Carmen McRae
- Anita O'Day
- Esther Ofarim 1968
- Cybill Shepherd, as the title track for her 1978 album with Stan Getz
- Elaine Paige on her 1993 album Romance & the Stage
- Miss Piggy (as "Mad About the Frog")
- Tom Robinson – Cabaret '79 (1982)
- Dinah Shore
- Sheridan Smith
- Jeri Southern – The Dream's on Jeri (1998)
- Cécile McLorin Salvant
- Adam Lambert (2022)

== See also ==
- Liberace
- Mad About the Boy: The Noel Coward Story
