= London by Night =

London by Night may refer to:

- London by Night (album), a 1958 album by Julie London
- London by Night (film), an American 1937 film
- "London by Night" (song), a song by Carroll Coates and recorded by Frank Sinatra
- London by Night, a supplement to the 2002 tabletop role-playing game Victorian Age: Vampire
