= How Come You Do Me Like You Do? =

- Sheet music cover (1924)

Song
- Published: 1924
- Songwriters: Gene Austin, Roy Bergere

"How Come You Do Me Like You Do?" is a song written by vaudeville comedy duo Gene Austin and Roy Bergere in 1924. It has later been covered by many artists, and is considered a jazz standard.

Austin and Bergere were a vaudeville comedy duet act performing in the East and Midwest. "How Come You Do Me Like You Do?" became a national hit in 1924 for Marion Harris. Austin would later achieve even greater fame with his recording of "My Blue Heaven" in 1927.

The song has been covered by many artists, including Louis Armstrong, Cab Calloway, Eddie Condon, Duke Ellington, Lead Belly, Benny Goodman, Coleman Hawkins, Fletcher Henderson, George Shearing, Jane Powell, Teddi King, and Old Man Markley.

A recording by Lisa Kirk with orchestra was made at Manhattan Center, New York City, on July 16, 1952. It was released by RCA Victor Records as catalog number 20-4869.

Jane Powell included the song in her album Can't We Be Friends (1956).

Julie London included the song in her album Swing Me an Old Song (1959).

Bing Crosby recorded the song for his album Bing Crosby's Treasury - The Songs I Love (1968 version)

== Film appearances ==
- That's the Spirit (1945)
- Three for the Show (1955) - performed by Betty Grable.

== See also ==
- List of 1920s jazz standards
