= Mae (song) =

1965 song written by Riz Ortolani

"Mae" is a 1965 song written by Riz Ortolani for the MGM motion picture The Yellow Rolls-Royce.

== Background ==
The song is the theme for the section of the film in which ownership of the titular Rolls-Royce passes to a gangster and becomes the backdrop to a dangerous romance between the gangster's girlfriend Mae Jenkins (Shirley MacLaine) and a young Italian named Stefano (Alain Delon).

== 1965 recordings ==
- The tune was covered as an instrumental by Herb Alpert on Going Places, and released as a single, where it peaked at #26 on the US Easy Listening chart.
- Pete Fountain, also released it as an instrumental, where it peaked at #27 on US Easy Listening chart.

== Other recordings ==
- The song with English lyrics, "She's Just a Quiet Girl", was recorded and released as a single by Ella Fitzgerald.
- Julie London included the song on her album Feeling Good (1965).
