= In Person at the Americana =

Live album by Julie London
- Released: 1964
- Recorded: April 1964
- Venue: The Royal Box, Americana Hotel, New York City
- Genre: Vocal jazz, traditional pop
- Label: Liberty
- Producer: Snuff Garrett

Julie London chronology
Julie London (1964)	In Person at the Americana (1964)	Our Fair Lady (1965)

In Person at the Americana is an LP album by Julie London, released by Liberty Records under catalog number LRP-3375 as a monophonic recording and catalog number LST-7375 in stereo in 1964. It was arranged and conducted by Don Bagley and recorded live at The Royal Box supper club at the Americana Hotel in New York in April 1964.

== Track listing ==
1. Opening / "Lonesome Road" (Nathaniel Shilkret, Gene Austin)–2:32
2. "Send for Me" (Ollie Jones)–2:15
3. "My Baby Just Cares for Me" (Walter Donaldson, Gus Kahn)–3:34
4. "The Trolley Song" (Hugh Martin, Ralph Blane)–2:07
5. "Daddy" (Bobby Troup)–2:56
6. "Medley: Basin Street Blues/St. Louis Blues/Baby Baby All the Time" (Spencer Williams/W. C. Handy/Bobby Troup)–4:49
7. "Kansas City" (Jerry Leiber, Mike Stoller)–2:20
8. "Bye Bye Blackbird" (Ray Henderson, Mort Dixon)–2:27
9. "By Myself" (Arthur Schwartz, Howard Dietz)–4:12
10. "I Love Paris" (Cole Porter)–2:14
11. "Gotta Move" (Peter Matz)–1:39
12. "Cry Me a River" (Arthur Hamilton)–2:41
13. "The Man That Got Away" (Harold Arlen, Ira Gershwin) / Closing–3:12

== Selected personnel ==
- Julie London - vocals
- Jerome Richardson - reeds
- Sal Salvador - guitar
- Don Bagley - double bass, arranger
- Ken Albers - vocal arranger
- Tom Dowd - engineer
- David Hassinger - engineer
