= By Myself =

By Myself may refer to:

== Albums ==
- By Myself (Hitomi album), 1996
- By Myself (Julie London album), 1965
- By Myself, 1977 album by Abdul Wadud

== Songs ==
- "By Myself" (1937 song), written by Arthur Schwartz and Howard Dietz, introduced in the musical Between the Devil
- "By Myself" (Lil Baby and Rylo Rodriguez song)
- "By Myself", a song by Aretha Franklin from Aretha (with the Ray Bryant Combo)
- "By Myself", a song by Leonard Nimoy from Two Sides of Leonard Nimoy
- "By Myself", a song by Linkin Park from Hybrid Theory

== Other ==
- Lauren Bacall by Myself, reprinted as By Myself and Then Some, an autobiography by Lauren Bacall

== See also ==
- All by Myself (disambiguation)
