= The Dream's on Jeri =

Compilation album

Compilation album by Jeri Southern
- Released: April 7, 1998
- Genre: Vocal, Jazz
- Length: 55:06
- Label: Jasmine Records

The Dream's on Jeri is a 1998 compilation album by Jeri Southern released on Jasmine Records. It contains various songs from other albums recorded by Jeri Southern during her career. It was released on compact disc.

== Track listing ==
The CD consists of 22 tracks:

1. "I've Got Five Dollars" (Richard Rodgers, Lorenz Hart)
2. "You Better Go Now" (Irvin Graham, Bickley Reichner)
3. "Mad About the Boy" (Noël Coward)
4. "Everything But You" (Duke Ellington, Harry James, Don George)
5. "It Must Be True" (Harry Barris, Gus Arnheim, Gordon Clifford)
6. "An Occasional Man" (Hugh Martin, Ralph Blane)
7. "Come By Sunday" (Murray Grand)
8. "I Remember You" (Victor Schertzinger, Johnny Mercer)
9. "When I Fall in Love" (Victor Young, Edward Heyman)
10. "The Gypsy in My Soul" (Clay Boland, Moe Jaffe)
11. "We're Not Children Anymore" (Sanford Green, Harry Ross)
12. "It's D'Lovely" (Cole Porter)
13. "Life Does a Girl a Favour" (Jay Livingston, Ray Evans)
14. "September in the Rain" (Harry Warren, Al Dubin)
15. "I Thought of You Last Night" (Ralph Freed)
16. "This Time the Dream's on Me" (Harold Arlen, Johnny Mercer)
17. "I Hadn't Anyone Till You" (Ray Noble)
18. "Something I Dreamed Last Night" (Sammy Fain, Jack Yellen, Herb Magidson)
19. "He Was Too Good to Me" (Richard Rodgers, Lorenz Hart)
20. "Just in Time" (Jule Styne, Betty Comden, Adolph Green)
21. "Married I Can Always Get" (Gordon Jenkins)
22. "You Better Go Now" (Irvin Graham, Bickley Reichner)

== Notes ==
- Tracks 9 and 22 with the Jerry Gray Orchestra (Track 9 version conducted by the Marty Paich orchestra)
- Track 11 with the Ray Bloch Orchestra
- Track 13 with the Harry Sosnick Orchestra
- Tracks 20 and 21 with the Navy Orchestra
