= I Hadn't Anyone Till You =

1938 song by Ray Noble

Single by Tony Martin (featuring the Ray Noble Band)
- Published: 1938
- Genre: Jazz, popular standard
- Composer: Ray Noble

"I Hadn't Anyone Till You" is a popular song written by Ray Noble in 1938. It has been recorded by many artists and is regarded as a standard.

Tony Martin sang it with the Ray Noble band in 1938, reaching number four in the charts over a period of twelve weeks. A Tommy Dorsey version (with a vocal by Jack Leonard) the same year reached number ten.

Alec Wilder wrote of the song,

It is a smooth, direct, slightly rhythmic ballad of no great range and unmistakably a song of its time, the late thirties. It makes a move in the second half of the B section (the design is A-B-A-C/A) into the key of A major from the parent key of F major, which adds that dash of color needed in a song of so direct and unpushy a nature. It is a song with both sophistication and a flavor of the past.

== Other recordings ==
- Billie Holiday - for the album Velvet Mood (1956)
- Bobby Darin - included in his album It's You or No One (1963)
- Brenda Lee - for her album All Alone Am I (1963)
- Carla Bley - for her album Appearing Nightly (2008)
- Caterina Valente - for the album Strictly U.S.A. (1963).
- Connee Boswell - recorded June 15, 1938.
- Dinah Shore - for her album Somebody Loves Me (1959).
- Doris Day - included in her album Day by Day (1957).
- Ella Fitzgerald - a single release (1949) and for the album Ella Fitzgerald Sings Songs from the Soundtrack of "Let No Man Write My Epitaph" (1960)
- Frank Sinatra - for his album Sinatra and Strings (1962)
- Jeri Southern - for the album The Southern Style (1955).
- Joni James - The Mood Is Romance (1961).
- Judy Garland - for her album Judy in Love (1958)
- Julie London - For the Night People (1966)
- Lena Horne - Lena on the Blue Side (1962)
- Margaret Whiting - for her album Margaret Whiting Sings for the Starry-Eyed (1956).
- Mel Torme - a single release in 1950.
- Patti Page - So Many Memories (1954).
- Sarah Vaughan - Snowbound (1962)
- Steve Lawrence - Swing Softly with Me (1959).
- Vic Damone - a single release in 1950.

== Popular culture ==
- Hadda Brooks - performs the song in the motion picture, In a Lonely Place (1950).
