= Where Do You Think You're Going =

Where Do You Think You're Going may refer to:

- "Where Do You Think You're Going", a song by Johnny Mathis from the 1959 album Faithfully
- "Where Do You Think You're Going?", song by Dire Straits from 1979 album Communiqué
- "Where Do You Think You're Going", song by Shania Twain from the deluxe edition of the 2017 album Now
