= Saturday Night (Is the Loneliest Night of the Week) =

1944 song by Jule Styne and Sammy Cahn

Single by Frank Sinatra
- B-side: "I Dream of You (More Than You Dream I Do)"
- Published: 1944
- Released: December 1944
- Recorded: November 14, 1944
- Genre: Traditional pop
- Length: 2:43
- Label: Columbia
- Composer: Jule Styne
- Lyricist: Sammy Cahn

"Saturday Night (Is the Loneliest Night in the Week)", also known as "Saturday Night (Is the Loneliest Night of the Week)", is a popular song published in 1944 with music by Jule Styne and lyrics by Sammy Cahn.

== Background ==
Although it has been interpreted as referring to the separation of romantic partners during wartime, Cahn said that song actually refers to show business people who are not working on Saturday night.

== 1945 recordings ==
Charted versions in 1945 were by Frank Sinatra (recorded November 14, 1944, released by Columbia Records as catalog number 36762), (No. 2 in the charts), Sammy Kaye and His Orchestra (vocal by Nancy Norman) (No. 6), Frankie Carle and His Orchestra (vocal by Phyllis Lynne) (No. 8), Woody Herman and His Orchestra (vocal by Frances Wayne) (No. 15) and by The King Sisters (No. 15).

== Other versions ==
- Eydie Gormé – Eydie Gormé, 1957
- Frank Sinatra - recorded November 29, 1957 for Capitol Records
- Julie London - for her album For the Night People (1966)
- Rosemary Clooney - for her album For the Duration (1991)
- Barry Manilow - Manilow Sings Sinatra (1998)

== Popular culture ==
- Sinatra also sang the song in the short film The All-Star Bond Rally (1945).
