= Dom João =

Dom João is a Portuguese title that may refer to:

== People ==
- John of Portugal (disambiguation), various royals
- Dharmapala of Kotte (1541–1597)

== Locations ==
- One of Lapa, Dom João, and Montanha islands near Macau
- Dom João de Castro Bank, a submarine volcano in the North Atlantic
- Ribeira Dom João, a settlement in Cape Verde
