= The Royal Box (New York City nightclub) =

- Interactive map of The Royal Box
- Location: Americana Hotel, 811 Seventh Avenue, Midtown Manhattan, New York City
- Coordinates: 40°45′45.2″N 73°58′54.0″W
- Owner: Loews Corporation
- Operator: Loews Corporation
- Capacity: 326
- Type: Supper club and nightclub
- Events: Jazz, pop, cabaret

Construction
- Opened: October 1962
- Closed: 1979
- Years active: 1962–1979

The Royal Box was a supper club and nightclub located within the Americana Hotel at 811 Seventh Avenue in Midtown Manhattan, New York City.

Opened in October 1962, shortly after the hotel was inaugurated, the club, with a capacity of 326 seats, soon became a notable music and live entertainment venue in the city, hosting popular jazz, pop singers and comedians of the day.

The club was closed in 1979 when the hotel was sold to Sheraton Hotels.

== History ==
The Royal Box opened on October 15, 1962, with a performance by Harry Belafonte.

The Royal Box hosted performances by Duke Ellington, Ella Fitzgerald, Frank Sinatra, Sammy Davis Jr., Julie London (who recorded the live album In Person at the Americana at the club in April 1964), Peggy Lee (who appeared at the club in May 1964) the Tommy Dorsey Orchestra (who recorded Live At The Royal Box Of The Americana New York in 1964), Liberace, Shirley Bassey (who appeared there in April 1966), Wayne Newton (who performed there in May 1970), Paul Anka (who recorded the live album Paul Anka Live! there in 1967), Gladys Knight & the Pips, Sonny & Cher, Engelbert Humperdinck, and The Lettermen.

The club also hosted live standup comedy, featuring comedians such as Woody Allen, who performed there with the Bitter End Singers in 1966.

It closed in 1979 when the Americana Hotel was sold to Sheraton and rebranded as the Sheraton Centre.

== Description ==
The Royal Box club was described as being "shaped like a rectangular box" and was built to accommodate for 326 people. It was a long, narrow room with a low blue-painted ceiling and blue walls and carpets at the time it was opened. One wall of the club contained 10 alcoves, each with a 3 feet (0.91 m) figurine of a notable monarch such as King John of Portugal (Note: There were several monarchs known as John of Portugal, and the source does not specify which one is meant. The source does say that the monarchs chosen were "European monarchs 'whose countries contributed to the discovery and exploration of the New World'", so likely candidates are John III and John V, during whose reigns Portugal established and expanded its colonial presence in the Americas.), Queen Isabella of Spain, and King Louis XIV of France. The interior was renovated again in 1963.
