= Number, Please =

Number, Please may refer to:

- Number, Please (film), a 1931 British crime film
- Number, Please? (film), a 1920 American short comedy film
- Number Please (game show), a 1960s American game show

== See also ==
- Your Number Please, a 1959 LP album by Julie London
