= Julie Is Her Name =

Studio album by Julie London
- Released: December 1955
- Recorded: August 8–9, 1955
- Studio: Western Recorders, Hollywood
- Genre: Vocal jazz; traditional pop
- Length: 30:04
- Label: Liberty
- Producer: Bobby Troup

Julie London chronology
Julie Is Her Name (1955)	Lonely Girl (1956)

Singles from Julie Is Her Name
- 1. "Cry Me a River" Released: October 1955

Julie Is Her Name is the first LP album by Julie London, released by Liberty Records in December, 1955, under catalog numbers LRP-3006, in monaural form. It was subsequently reprocessed to produce a stereophonic album, and this stereophonic version was released on May 25, 1960, as catalog number LST-7027. The album featured Barney Kessel on guitar and Ray Leatherwood on bass.

The first track, "Cry Me a River", was released as a single (Liberty 55006) and was London's biggest chart success.

The album was reissued, combined with the 1958 Julie London album Julie Is Her Name, Volume II, in compact disc format, by EMI in 1992. Another reissue as a CD was produced by Hallmark Music, combined with the 1956 Julie London album, Lonely Girl.

== Critical reception ==
Professional ratings
Review scores
Source	Rating
AllMusic	4/5 stars

A Cash Box magazine reviewer noted that London combines in the album a more than generous amount of passionate, sexy and sophisticated presentation of material, which was carefully selected taking into account the vocalist's voice.

Jazz critic Scott Yanow called this album one of the best in Julie London's career. Interpretations of well-known standards seemed to him simple, but at the same time executed with taste. He highlighted the songs "I Should Care", "Say It Isn't So", "Easy Street" and "Gone with the Wind".

== Track listing ==
Side A
No.	Title	Writer(s)	Length
1.	"Cry Me a River"	Arthur Hamilton	2:36
2.	"I Should Care"	Paul Weston; Axel Stordahl; Sammy Cahn	2:35
3.	"I'm in the Mood for Love"	Jimmy McHugh; Dorothy Fields	2:28
4.	"I'm Glad There Is You"	Jimmy Dorsey; Paul Madeira	2:34
5.	"Can't Help Lovin' That Man"	Jerome Kern; Oscar Hammerstein II	3:08
6.	"I Love You"	Cole Porter	1:58
Total length:			15:19

Side B
No.	Title	Writer(s)	Length
1.	"Say It Isn't So"	Irving Berlin	2:00
2.	"It Never Entered My Mind"	Richard Rodgers; Lorenz Hart	2:25
3.	"Easy Street"	Alan Rankin Jones; Bud Carlton	3:12
4.	"'S Wonderful"	George Gershwin; Ira Gershwin	1:33
5.	"No Moon at All"	Dave Mann; Redd Evans	1:53
6.	"Laura"	David Raksin; Johnny Mercer	1:37
7.	"Gone with the Wind"	Allie Wrubel; Herbert Magidson	2:05
Total length:			14:45

== Charts ==
Chart performance for Julie Is Her Name
Chart (1956)	Peak position
US Popular Albums (Billboard)	2
US Best Selling Pop Albums (Cash Box)	1
