= Too Good to Be True (Clay Boland song) =

1936 song

Song
- Published: 1936
- Genre: swing
- Songwriter: Clay Boland

"Too Good to Be True" is a popular song composed by dentist-songwriter Clay Boland and published in 1936. It has since been recorded by many jazz and swing musicians including Benny Goodman and Roy Eldridge.

== Composition and notable recordings ==
Clay Boland, while studying dentistry at the University of Scranton and University of Pennsylvania, taught himself to play piano and worked in dance bands. In 1936 he started work as a writer/director for Penn's Mask and Wig show. One of his first compositions for the production Red Rumba was "Too Good to Be True", for which Boland wrote the lyrics and music. The song, which became a favorite of the swing era, recalls the proverbial expression "it seems too good to be true," and alludes to the singer's presumed love interest. Musician-author Warren Vaché called the song "a little gem" that was "promptly slated for immortality with an outstanding recording by the Benny Goodman Trio featuring Helen Ward on the vocal." This version, originally released on a Victor 78 rpm record in 1936, was later included on The Complete Benny Goodman, Vol. 2 (1935-1936) compilation album.

Trumpeter Roy Eldridge also released a version of the song in 1936. The recording features the Teddy Wilson Orchestra, which included a rhythm section consisting of Wilson (piano), Sid Catlett (drums), and Israel Crosby (bass). Musician-writer John Goldsby noted that "Too Good to Be True" is among the songs that exemplified Crosby's early playing. "You can hear the seeds of Israel's melodic style, especially in the eighth-note countermelodies he plays behind Chu Berry's saxophone solo." Trumpeter-writer John Chilton described Berry's solo as "a ravishing interpretation of the 32-bar theme" and suggested it was reminiscent of Coleman Hawkins' saxophone playing on the 1933 song "The Day You Came Along".

== Other versions ==
The song has been recorded many other times, and can be considered a standard. Among the recordings are versions by:

- Charlie Barnet and his orchestra (recorded May 13, 1936; released as Melotone catalog number 6-07-12, with the flip side "My First Thrill")
- Chu Berry
- Lars Erstrand on his album "Lars Erstrand and Four Brothers"
- Keith Ingham on his album The Keith Ingham New York 9, Vol. 1, released by Jump Records in 1994.
- Julie London on her album Julie Is Her Name, Volume II (released by Liberty Records as catalog number LRP-3100 (monaural) and LST-7100 (stereophonic), 1958)
- Lee Wiley on her album Manhattan Moods: Outstanding Live Recordings, released by Jazz Factory in 2000.
- Teddy Wilson and his orchestra (recorded May 14, 1936; released as Brunswick catalog number 7673, with the flip side "Mary Had a Little Lamb")
