= Julie Is Her Name, Volume II =

Studio album by Julie London
- Released: August 1, 1958
- Recorded: July 8, 10–11, 17–19, 1958
- Studio: Liberty Studios, Hollywood
- Genre: Vocal jazz, traditional pop
- Length: 25:29
- Label: Liberty
- Producer: Bobby Troup

Julie London chronology
Julie (1957)	Julie Is Her Name, Volume II (1958)	London by Night (1958)

Julie Is Her Name, Volume II is an LP album by Julie London, released by Liberty Records on August 1, 1958, under catalog numbers LRP-3100 (monaural) and LST-7100 (stereophonic). The musical personnel on the recording include Howard Roberts on guitar and Red Mitchell on bass.

== Track listing ==
Track number	Title	Songwriter(s)	Time
1	"Blue Moon"	Richard Rodgers, Lorenz Hart	2:20
2	"What Is This Thing Called Love?"	Cole Porter	1:47
3	"How Long Has This Been Going On?"	George, Ira Gershwin	2:46
4	"Too Good to Be True"	Clay Boland	2:40
5	"Spring Is Here"	Richard Rodgers, Lorenz Hart	2:05
6	"Goody Goody"	Johnny Mercer, Matt Malneck	1:55
7	"The One I Love Belongs to Somebody Else"	Isham Jones, Gus Kahn	2:00
8	"If I'm Lucky"	Josef Myrow, Eddie DeLange	2:16
9	"Hot Toddy"	Ralph Flanagan, Herb Hendler	1:45
10	"Little White Lies"	Walter Donaldson	2:00
11	"I Guess I'll Have to Change My Plan"	Arthur Schwartz, Howard Dietz	1:50
12	"I Got Lost in His Arms"	Irving Berlin	2:05

The album was reissued, combined with the 1955 Julie London album Julie Is Her Name, in compact disc format, by EMI in 1992.
