= Nice Girls Don't Stay for Breakfast =

Studio album by Julie London
- Released: 1967
- Recorded: Late 1966
- Genre: Traditional pop
- Length: 33:11
- Label: Liberty
- Producer: Calvin Carter

Julie London chronology
For the Night People (1966)	Nice Girls Don't Stay for Breakfast (1967)	With Body & Soul (1967)

Nice Girls Don't Stay for Breakfast is an LP album by Julie London, released by Liberty Records under catalog number LRP-3493 as a monophonic recording and catalog number LST-7493 in stereo in 1967. The song arrangements were by Don Bagley.

== Track listing ==
1. "Nice Girls Don't Stay for Breakfast" (Jerome J. Leshay, Bobby Troup) 2:25
2. "When I Grow Too Old to Dream" (Sigmund Romberg, Oscar Hammerstein II) 2:52
3. "I've Got a Crush on You" (George Gershwin, with lyrics by Ira Gershwin) 2:13
4. "Everything I Have Is Yours" (Burton Lane, Harold Adamson) 3:05
5. "You Made Me Love You" (James V. Monaco, Joseph McCarthy) 2:18
6. "Baby Won't You Please Come Home" (Charles Warfield, Clarence Williams) 2:11
7. "I Didn't Know What Time It Was" (Richard Rodgers, Lorenz Hart) 2:50
8. "Give a Little Whistle" (Leigh Harline, Ned Washington) 3:06
9. "I Surrender, Dear" (Harry Barris, Gordon Clifford) 3:40
10. "You Go to My Head" (J. Fred Coots, Haven Gillespie) 3:07
11. "There Will Never Be Another You" (Harry Warren, Mack Gordon) 3:16
12. "Mickey Mouse March" (Jimmie Dodd) 2:08

== Personnel ==
- Julie London - vocals
- Bob Cooper - tenor saxophone
- Jack Sheldon - trumpet
- John Gray - guitar
- Don Bagley - double bass, arranger
