= Julie (album) =

Studio album by Julie London
- Released: 1957
- Recorded: October 1957
- Studio: Liberty Studios, Hollywood
- Genre: Traditional pop, vocal jazz
- Length: 31:21
- Label: Liberty
- Producer: Bobby Troup

Julie London chronology
| Make Love to Me (1957) | Julie (1957) | Julie Is Her Name, Volume II (1958) |

Julie is an LP album by Julie London, released by Liberty Records under catalog numbers LRP-3096 (monaural) in 1957 and LST-7004 (stereophonic) in 1958.

The cover by art director Charles Ward was nominated at the 1st Annual Grammy Awards for Best Album Cover but lost to Frank Sinatra Sings for Only the Lonely.

== Track listing ==
| Track number | Title | Songwriter(s) | Length |
|---|---|---|---|
| 1 | "Somebody Loves Me" | George Gershwin, Ballard MacDonald, B. G. De Sylva | 3:04 |
| 2 | "Dream of You" | Jimmie Lunceford, Michael Morales, Sy Oliver | 2:44 |
| 3 | "Daddy" | Bobby Troup | 2:20 |
| 4 | "Bye Bye Blackbird" | Ray Henderson, Mort Dixon | 2:37 |
| 5 | "Free and Easy" | Henry Mancini, Bobby Troup | 2:21 |
| 6 | "All My Life" | Sam H. Stept, Sidney D. Mitchell | 3:09 |
| 7 | "When the Red, Red Robin (Comes Bob, Bob, Bobbin' Along)" | Harry M. Woods | 1:46 |
| 8 | "Midnight Sun" | Lionel Hampton, Sonny Burke, Johnny Mercer | 2:31 |
| 9 | "You're Getting to Be a Habit with Me" | Harry Warren, Al Dubin | 2:32 |
| 10 | "Don'cha Go 'Way Mad" | Illinois Jacquet, Jimmy Mundy, Al Stillman | 2:40 |
| 11 | "Back Home Again in Indiana" | Ballard MacDonald, James F. Hanley | 2:56 |
| 12 | "For You" | Joseph Burke, Al Dubin | 2:41 |

== Personnel ==
- Julie London - vocals
- Georgie Auld - tenor saxophone
- Benny Carter - alto saxophone
- Pete Candoli - trumpet
- Jack Sheldon - trumpet
- Buddy Collette - reeds
- Bud Shank - reeds
- Jimmy Rowles - piano, arranger
- Al Hendrickson - guitar
- Ray Leatherwood - bass
- Ted Keep - engineer
- Bobby Troup - producer
