= Easy Does It (Julie London album) =

Album by Julie London

Studio album by Julie London
- Released: 1968
- Recorded: October–November 1967
- Genre: Traditional pop
- Label: Liberty

Julie London chronology
| With Body & Soul (1967) | Easy Does It (1968) | Yummy, Yummy, Yummy (1969) |

Easy Does It is a 1968 album by singer Julie London.

By 1967, Julie London was on her way to exiting her long-term contract with Liberty Records. The album was released by Liberty Records under catalog number LRP-3546 as a monophonic recording and LST-7546 as a stereophonic.

== Track listing ==
1. "Show Me the Way to Go Home"* - (Irving King a.k.a. Jimmy Campbell and Reg Connelly) - 2:39
2. "Me and My Shadow"* - (Dave Dreyer, Billy Rose, Al Jolson) - 3:00
3. "This Can't Be Love"* - (Richard Rodgers, Lorenz Hart) - 3:31
4. "Spring Will Be a Little Late This Year"** - (Frank Loesser) - 2:55
5. "Soon It's Gonna Rain"* - (Harvey Schmidt, Tom Jones) - 2:43
6. "I'll See You in My Dreams"** - (Isham Jones, Gus Kahn) - 3:41-
7. "April in Paris" - (Vernon Duke, Yip Harburg) - 3:20
8. "Bidin' My Time" - (George Gershwin, Ira Gershwin) - 3:50
9. "The Man I Love" - (George Gershwin, Ira Gershwin) - 3:29
10. "It Had to Be You" - (Isham Jones, Gus Kahn) - 3:34
11. "We'll Be Together Again" - (Carl T. Fischer, Frankie Laine) - 2:59
12. "The One I Love Belongs to Someone Else" - (Isham Jones, Gus Kahn) - 2:26

== Personnel ==
- Julie London - vocals
- Kirk Stuart - piano, organ, arranger
- John Gray - guitar
- Don Bagley - double bass, arranger*
- Earl Palmer - drums
- Allyn Ferguson - arranger**
