= Julie London (album) =

Studio album by Julie London
- Released: 1964
- Recorded: Late 1963
- Genre: Traditional pop
- Label: Liberty
- Producer: Snuff Garrett

Julie London chronology
The Wonderful World of Julie London (1963)	Julie London (1964)	In Person at the Americana (1964)

Julie London is an LP album by Julie London, released by Liberty Records under catalog number LRP-3342 as a monophonic recording and catalog number LST-7342 in stereo in 1964. It was arranged by Ernie Freeman; with Dave Hassinger as the engineer.

This Julie London album is commonly mistaken to be entitled as "You Don't Have to Be a Baby to Cry", due to mistitling on the album jacket's spine. This error had already happened previously with her 1963 album, The End of the World, when it was mistitled as "The Good Life" on the album jacket's spine.

== Track listing ==
No.	Title	Writer(s)	Length
1.	"Since I Fell for You"	Buddy Johnson	2:38
2.	"Night Life"	Willie Nelson	2:24
3.	"Charade"	Henry Mancini, Johnny Mercer	2:25
4.	"You Don't Have to Be a Baby to Cry"	Bob Merrill, Terry Shand	2:07
5.	"Wheel of Fortune"	Bennie Benjamin, George David Weiss	2:45
6.	"Wives and Lovers"	Burt Bacharach, Hal David	2:38
7.	"Fools Rush In"	Rube Bloom, Johnny Mercer	2:36
8.	"That Sunday, That Summer"	Joe Sherman, George David Weiss	2:57
9.	"I Wish You Love"	Charles Trenet, Albert A. Beach	2:36
10.	"There! I've Said It Again"	David Mann, Redd Evans	2:03
11.	"All About Ronnie"	Joe Greene	2:26
12.	"I Want to Find Out for Myself"	Arthur Kent, Sylvia Dee	2:20
Total length:			29:48

== Personnel ==
- Julie London – vocals
- Plas Johnson – tenor saxophone
- Jack Sheldon – trumpet
- Ernie Freeman – arranger, conductor
