= The Wonderful World of Julie London =

Studio album by Julie London
- Released: October 1963
- Recorded: Mid 1963
- Genre: Traditional pop
- Label: Liberty
- Producer: Snuff Garrett

Julie London chronology
The End of the World (1963)	The Wonderful World of Julie London (1963)	Julie London (1964)

The Wonderful World of Julie London is an LP album by Julie London, released by Liberty Records under catalog number LRP-3324 as a monophonic recording and catalog number LST-7324 in stereo in November 1963. This was Julie London's final charting album, reaching #136 on the Billboard charts.

Ernie Freeman arranged and conducted the orchestra.

== Track listing ==
Track	Song	Songwriter(s)	Time
1	"I'm Coming Back to You"	Arthur Kent, Ed Warren	2:22
2	"Soft Summer Breeze"	Eddie Heywood, Judy Spencer	2:10
3	"Can't Get Used to Losing You"	Doc Pomus, Mort Shuman	2:23
4	"A Taste of Honey"	Bobby Scott, Ric Marlow	3:18
5	"Little Things Mean a Lot"	Carl Stutz, Edith Lindeman	2:55
6	"In the Still of the Night"	Cole Porter	2:46
7	"Love for Sale"	Cole Porter	3:02
8	"When Snowflakes Fall in the Summer"	Barry Mann, Cynthia Weil	1:48
9	"How Can I Make Him Love Me?"	Doc Pomus, Mort Shuman	1:58
10	"Say Wonderful Things"	Philip Green, Norman Newell	2:25
11	"Guilty Heart"	Jimmie Haskell, Alfred Perry, Barry De Vorzon	2:22
12	"I Love You and Don't You Forget It"	Henry Mancini, Al Stillman	2:15
