= The Morning After (1937 song) =

1937 song composed by Tommy Dorsey, Moe Jaffe, and Clay Boland

1937 sheet music cover, Standard Music, Inc., New York.

"The Morning After" is a 1937 song composed by Tommy Dorsey, Moe Jaffe, and Clay Boland. Tommy Dorsey and His Orchestra released the song as a Victor 78 single in 1937 with Jack Leonard on vocals.

"The Morning After" was released as a Victor 78, 25703-A, by Tommy Dorsey and His Orchestra in 1937 with "I May Be Wrong But I Think You're Wonderful" as the B side. The song was published by the Standard Music Publications, Inc. in New York.

== Other recordings ==
The song was also recorded by Red Norvo and His Orchestra and was released as a Brunswick 78, 7932, in 1937 featuring Mildred Bailey on vocals. Lennie Hayton and His Orchestra also released a recording of the song on Decca with Paul Barry on vocals.
