= Lonely Girl (album) =

Studio album by Julie London
- Released: 1956
- Recorded: April 1956
- Studio: Western Recorders, Hollywood
- Genre: Traditional pop; vocal jazz
- Length: 30:09
- Label: Liberty
- Producer: Bobby Troup

Julie London chronology
Julie Is Her Name (1955)	Lonely Girl (1956)	Calendar Girl (1956)

Professional ratings
Review scores
Source	Rating
AllMusic	4/5 stars
Encyclopedia of Popular Music	3/5 stars

Lonely Girl is an LP album by Julie London, released by Liberty Records under catalog number LRP-3012 as a monophonic recording in 1956 and later in rechanneled stereo under catalog number LST-7029 in 1959.

The album (minus "What'll I Do") was reissued, combined with London's 1957 album Make Love to Me, on compact disc on January 28, 2003, by EMI.

== Track listing ==
Side A
No.	Title	Writer(s)	Length
1.	"Lonely Girl"	Bobby Troup	2:35
2.	"Fools Rush In"	Rube Bloom; Johnny Mercer	2:10
3.	"Moments Like This"	Frank Loesser; Burton Lane	2:41
4.	"I Lost My Sugar in Salt Lake City"	Leon René; Johnny Lange	2:38
5.	"It's the Talk of the Town"	Jerry Livingston; Al J. Neiburg; Marty Symes	2:38
6.	"What'll I Do"	Irving Berlin	1:56

Side B
No.	Title	Writer(s)	Length
1.	"When Your Lover Has Gone"	Einar A. Swan	2:12
2.	"Don't Take Your Love from Me"	Henry Nemo	2:33
3.	"Where or When"	Richard Rodgers; Lorenz Hart	2:40
4.	"All Alone"	Berlin	1:53
5.	"Mean to Me"	Roy Turk; Fred E. Ahlert	2:14
6.	"How Deep Is the Ocean"	Berlin	2:13
7.	"Remember"	Berlin	1:46
Total length:			30:09

== Personnel ==
- Julie London – Vocals
- Al Viola – Guitar
- Bobby Troup – Producer
- John Neal – Engineer
- Ray Jones – Cover photography
- Chris Ingham – Liner notes

For the reissue

- Andy Morten – Producer, design
- Joe Foster – Producer, recreation
- Norman Blake – Recreation
- Bob Norberg – Remastering

== Charts ==
Chart performance for Lonely Girl
Chart (1956)	Peak position
US Top LPs (Billboard)	16
