= For the Night People =

Studio album by Julie London
- Released: 1966
- Recorded: Mid 1966
- Genres: Vocal jazz, traditional pop
- Length: 33 Minutes
- Label: Liberty
- Producer: Calvin Carter

Julie London chronology
All Through the Night: Julie London Sings the Choicest of Cole Porter (1965)	For the Night People (1966)	Nice Girls Don't Stay for Breakfast (1967)

For the Night People is an LP album by Julie London, released by Liberty Records in 1966 under catalog number LRP-3478 as a monophonic recording and catalog number LST-7478 in stereo.

== Track listing ==
1. "Won't You Come Home Bill Bailey" - (Hughie Cannon) - 2:23
2. "I Got It Bad (And That Ain't Good)" - (Duke Ellington, Paul Francis Webster) - 4:00
3. "Saturday Night (Is the Loneliest Night of the Week)" - (Jule Styne, Sammy Cahn) - 2:41
4. "God Bless the Child" - (Arthur Herzog, Jr., Billie Holiday) - 3:40
5. "Am I Blue?" - (Harry Akst, Grant Clarke) - 3:29
6. "Dream" - (Johnny Mercer) - 2:33
7. "Here's That Rainy Day" (Jimmy Van Heusen, Johnny Burke) - 3:10
8. "When the Sun Comes Out" - (Harold Arlen, Ted Koehler) - 3:11
9. "Can't Get Out of This Mood" - (Jimmy McHugh, Frank Loesser) - 3:17
10. "I Hadn't Anyone Till You" - (Ray Noble) - 2:42
11. "I'll Never Smile Again" (Ruth Lowe) - 2:42
- Arrangements by Don Bagley
