= All by Myself (disambiguation) =

"All by Myself" is a 1975 song by Eric Carmen, with famous covers by Celine Dion and Frank Sinatra.

All by Myself may also refer to:

== Albums ==
- All by Myself (Eddie Kendricks album), 1971 on the Tamla imprint of Motown Records
- All by Myself (Regina Belle album), 1987
- All by Myself (Rikk Agnew album)
- All by Myself (Shirley Bassey album)

== Songs ==
- "All by Myself" (Irving Berlin song), 1921
- "All by Myself" (Bee Gees song), 1966
- "All by Myself" (Alok, Sigala and Ellie Goulding song), 2022
- "All by Myself", a 1941 song by Big Bill Broonzy
  - Re-recorded by Fats Domino on Rock and Rollin' with Fats Domino, 1956
- "All by Myself", a song by Green Day from Dookie, 1994
- "All by Myself", a song by Ringo Starr from Goodnight Vienna, 1974

== Other media ==
- All by Myself (film), a 1943 American comedy film
- "All by Myself" (Grey's Anatomy), an episode of the TV series Grey's Anatomy
- "All by Myself", an episode of the TV series 7th Heaven
- All by Myself, a 1983 Little Critter book by Mercer Mayer
- All by Myself: The Eartha Kitt Story, a 1982 documentary film

== See also ==
- By Myself (disambiguation)
