= With Body & Soul =

Studio album by Julie London
- Released: 1967
- Recorded: Mid 1967
- Genre: Vocal jazz, traditional pop
- Label: Liberty
- Producer: Calvin Carter

Julie London chronology
Nice Girls Don't Stay for Breakfast (1967)	With Body & Soul (1967)	Easy Does It (1968)

With Body & Soul is an LP album by Julie London, released by Liberty Records under catalog number LRP-3514 as a monophonic recording and catalog number LST-7514 in stereo in 1967. Kirk Stuart served as pianist and arranger.

== Track listing ==
Track	Song	Songwriter(s)	Time
1	"The Comeback"	L.C. Frazier	4:03
2	"Come On By"	Angelo Badalamenti, Norman Simon	3:14
3	"C.C. Rider"	traditional	3:50
4	"Romance in the Dark"	Lil Green	3:19
5	"I Got a Sweetie"	Ray Charles, Renald Richard	3:11
6	"You're No Good"	Clint Ballard, Jr.	2:13
7	"Alexander's Ragtime Band"	Irving Berlin	3:46
8	"If You Want This Love"	Baker Knight	3:08
9	"Looking Back"	Brook Benton, Belford Hendricks, Clyde Otis	4:09
10	"Treat Me Good"	Jimmy Radcliffe, Buddy Scott	3:12
11	"Straight Shooter"	John Phillips	2:49
