= Feeling Good (Julie London album) =

Album by Julie London

Studio album by Julie London
- Released: 1965
- Recorded: Mid 1965
- Genre: Vocal jazz, traditional pop
- Label: Liberty
- Producer: Richard Bock

Julie London chronology
Our Fair Lady (1965)	Feeling Good (1965)	By Myself (1965)

Feeling Good is an LP album by Julie London, released by Liberty Records under catalog number LRP-3416 as a monophonic recording and catalog number LST-7416 in stereo in 1965.

== Track listing ==
1. "My Kind of Town" - (Jimmy Van Heusen, Sammy Cahn) - 2:56
2. "Girl Talk" - (Neal Hefti, Bobby Troup) - 2:32
3. "King of the Road" - (Roger Miller) - 2:25
4. "I Bruise Easily" - (Fred Manley) - 3:37
5. "Feelin' Good" - (Anthony Newley, Leslie Bricusse) - 3:03
6. "Watermelon Man" - (Herbie Hancock) - 2:35
7. "She's Just a Quiet Girl" - (Riziero Ortolani, Paul Vance) - 2:40
8. "Summertime" - (George Gershwin, Ira Gershwin, DuBose Heyward) - 3:10
9. "Hello Dolly" - (Jerry Herman) - 3:00
10. "Won't Someone Please Belong To Me" - (Bobby Troup) - 3:42

Orchestra arranged and conducted by Gerald Wilson

== Personnel ==
According to Leonard Feather's liner notes;

- Jack Wilson - piano and organ
- Teddy Edwards - saxophone
- John Gray - guitar
- Jimmy Bond - bass
- Earl Palmer - drums
- Bones Howe - engineer
