= Latin in a Satin Mood =

Studio album by Julie London

Studio album by Julie London
- Released: 1963
- Recorded: Late 1962
- Genre: Traditional pop
- Label: Liberty
- Producer: Snuff Garrett

Julie London chronology
Love on the Rocks (1963)	Latin in a Satin Mood (1963)	The End of the World (1963)

Latin in a Satin Mood is an LP album by Julie London, released by Liberty Records under catalog number LRP-3278 as a monophonic recording and catalog number LST-7278 in stereo in 1963.

== Track listing ==
Track	Song	Songwriter(s)	Time
1	"Frenesi"	Alberto Domínguez	2:22
2	"Be Mine Tonight" (Noche de ronda)	Agustin Lara	2:32
3	"Yours"	Gonzalo Roig, Albert Gamse, Jack Sherr	2:38
4	"Bésame Mucho"	Consuelo Velázquez	2:07
5	"Adios"	Enric Madriguera	2:30
6	"Sway"	Luis Demetrio, Pablo Beltrán Ruiz	2:33
7	"Perfidia"	Alberto Domínguez	2:28
8	"Come Closer to Me"	Osvaldo Farrés	1:55
9	"Amor"	Gabriel Ruiz, Ricardo López Méndez, Sunny Skylar	2:42
10	"Magic Is the Moonlight"	María Grever, Charles Pasquale	2:22
11	"You Belong to My Heart" (Solamente una vez)	Agustín Lara	2:48
12	"Vaya con Dios"	Larry Russell, Inez James, Buddy Pepper	2:38
