= Love on the Rocks (album) =

Studio album by Julie London
- Released: 1963
- Recorded: August–September 1962
- Studio: Universal Recording, Chicago; United Recording, Los Angeles
- Genre: Traditional pop
- Label: Liberty
- Producer: Snuff Garrett

Julie London chronology
Love Letters (1962)	Love on the Rocks (1963)	Latin in a Satin Mood (1963)

Professional ratings
Review scores
Source	Rating
New Record Mirror	4/5 stars

Love on the Rocks is an LP album by Julie London, released by Liberty Records under catalog number LRP-3249 as a monophonic recording in 1963, and later in stereo under catalog number LST-7249 the same year.

Basic tracks were recorded at Liberty Records' new Chicago studios in three late-night sessions after Julie had finished her evening live performances at Mister Kelly's nightclub. Additional tracks were recorded later in Los Angeles, where arranger Pete King also added orchestral overdubs.

== Track listing ==
Track	Song	Songwriter(s)	Time
1	"How Did He Look?"	Gladys Shelley, Abner Silver	2:35
2	"What's New?"	Bob Haggart, Johnny Burke	2:36
3	"The End of a Love Affair"	Edward Redding	2:18
4	"A Cottage for Sale"	Willard Robison, Larry Conley	2:35
5	"Where Are You?"	Jimmy McHugh, Harold Adamson	2:36
6	"Willow Weep for Me"	Ann Ronell	3:20
7	"Guess Who I Saw Today"	Murray Grand, Elisse Boyd	3:05
8	"Where Did the Gentleman Go?"	Bobby Troup	2:55
9	"Don't Worry 'bout Me"	Rube Bloom, Ted Koehler	2:37
10	"I'll Be Seeing You"	Sammy Fain, Irving Kahal	2:10
11	"The Man that Got Away"	Harold Arlen, Ira Gershwin	3:36
12	"Love on the Rocks"	Francine Forest, Bob Hughes	2:40

== Selected personnel ==
- Julie London - vocals
- Jack Sheldon - trumpet
- John Gray - guitar
- Chuck Berghofer - double bass
- Kenny Hume - drums
- Pete King - arranger, conductor
