= Swing Me an Old Song =

Studio album by Julie London
- Released: 1959
- Recorded: April–May 1959
- Genre: Traditional pop, vocal jazz
- Length: 32:02
- Label: Liberty
- Producer: Bobby Troup

Julie London chronology
London by Night (1958)	Swing Me an Old Song (1959)	Your Number Please (1959)

Swing Me an Old Song is an LP album by Julie London, released by Liberty Records under catalog numbers LRP-3119 (monaural) and LST-7119 (stereophonic) in 1959. The accompaniment was by Jimmy Rowles and his Orchestra.

== Track listing ==
Track #	Song	Songwriter(s)	Length
1	"Comin' Thro' the Rye"	traditional	2:38
2	"Cuddle up a Little Closer"	Karl Hoschna, Otto Harbach	2:11
3	"After the Ball"	Charles K. Harris	2:45
4	"Be My Little Baby Bumble Bee"	Henry I. Marshall, Stanley Murphy	3:26
5	"Camptown Races"	Stephen Foster	3:24
6	"Old Folks at Home"	Stephen Foster	2:45
7	"Downtown Strutters' Ball"	Shelton Brooks	2:33
8	"How Come You Do Me Like You Do?"	Gene Austin, Roy Bergere	2:33
9	"Row, Row, Row"	James V. Monaco, William Jerome	2:24
10	"By the Beautiful Sea"	Harry Carroll, Harold Atteridge	2:16
11	"Bill Bailey, Won't You Please Come Home"	Hughie Cannon	1:53
12	"Three O'Clock in the Morning"	Julián Robledo, Theodora Morse	3:14

== Personnel ==
- Julie London – vocals
- Jack Sheldon - trumpet
- Jimmy Rowles - piano, arranger, conductor
- Al Viola - guitar
