= Sophisticated Lady (Julie London album) =

Studio album by Julie London
- Released: 1962
- Recorded: 1961
- Genres: Traditional pop, vocal jazz
- Label: Liberty
- Producer: Si Waronker

Julie London chronology
The Best of Julie (1962)	Sophisticated Lady (1962)	Love Letters (1962)

Sophisticated Lady is an LP album by Julie London, released by Liberty Records under catalog number LRP-3203 as a monophonic recording and catalog number LST-7203 in stereo in 1962. It was arranged and conducted by Ernie Freeman and co-arranged by Felix Slatkin.

== Track listing ==
1. "Sophisticated Lady" - (Duke Ellington, Mitchell Parish, Irving Mills) - 2:37
2. "Blame It On My Youth" - (Oscar Levant, Edward Heyman) - 2:35
3. "Make It Another Old-Fashioned, Please" - (Cole Porter) - 2:32
4. "You're Blasé" - (Ord Hamilton, Bruce Siever) - 3:13
5. "Bewitched" - (Richard Rodgers, Lorenz Hart) - 2:55
6. "Spring Can Really Hang You Up the Most" - (Tommy Wolf, Fran Landesman) - 3:50
7. "Remind Me" - (Jerome Kern, Dorothy Fields) - 3:14
8. "When She Makes Music" - (Jack Segal, Marvin Fisher) - 2:43
9. "When the World Was Young" - (M. Philippe-Gérard, Johnny Mercer) - 4:43
10. "If I Should Lose You" - (Ralph Rainger, Leo Robin) - 2:50
11. "Where Am I to Go?" - (Bobby Troup, Matt Dennis) - 2:55
12. "Absent Minded Me" - (Jule Styne, Bob Merrill) - 2:23
