= Clay Boland =

American composer

- Born: October 25, 1903; Olyphant, Pennsylvania, U.S.
- Died: July 23, 1963 (aged 59) St. Albans, Queens
- Occupation(s): Composer, U.S. Navy Dentist

Clay Boland (October 25, 1903 – July 23, 1963) was a composer. He was born in Olyphant, Pennsylvania, United States.

He studied dentistry at the University of Pennsylvania. In 1924, he won a university competition for a prom song with a composition entitled Dreary Weather. He then composed music for the university's Mask and Wig Club, collaborating especially with lyricist Moe Jaffe in writing the songs for many of their shows. He also performed as a pianist with leading big bands of the era and was noted for his skills as an arranger. He subsequently practiced as a dentist in Ardmore, Pennsylvania but continued to compose and participate as a partner in the music publishing business.

During World War II, he served as a lieutenant commander in the US Navy's Dental Corps, and was called up again for active duty in 1950 at the time of the Korean War.

In later life, he lived in Elizabeth, New Jersey and died on July 23, 1963, aged 59, in the Naval Hospital of St. Albans, Queens.

== Compositions ==
- "An Apple a Day"
- "Delightful Delerium"
- "Midnight on the Trail"
- "The Gypsy in My Soul"
- "Too Good to Be True"
- "The Morning After"
- "Something Has Happened to Me"
- "Stop Beating Around the Mulberry Bush"
- "Stop, It's Wonderful"
- "Tell Me at Midnight"
- "When I Climb Down from My Saddle"

== Shows ==
- This Mad Whirl
