= Make Love to Me (album) =

Studio album by Julie London
- Released: 1957
- Recorded: Spring/Summer 1957
- Studio: Liberty Studios, Hollywood
- Genre: Traditional pop, vocal jazz
- Length: 30:05
- Label: Liberty
- Producer: Simon Jackson

Julie London chronology
About the Blues (1957)	Make Love to Me (1957)	Julie (1957)

Make Love to Me is an LP album by Julie London, released by Liberty Records under catalog number LRP-3060 as a monophonic recording in 1957 and later in stereo under catalog number LST-7060 in 1959. The accompaniment was by Russ Garcia and His Orchestra.

The album was reissued, combined with London's 1956 album Lonely Girl, on compact disc on January 28, 2003, by EMI.

== Track listing ==
1. "If I Could Be with You (James P. Johnson, Henry Creamer)–2:17
2. "It's Good to Want You Bad" (Bobby Troup)–2:33
3. "Go Slow" (Russell Garcia, Debbie Cronk)–2:15
4. "A Room with a View" (Noël Coward)–2:55
5. "The Nearness of You" (Hoagy Carmichael, Ned Washington)–2:23
6. "Alone Together" (Arthur Schwartz, Howard Dietz)–2:25
7. "I Wanna Be Loved" (Johnny Green, Edward Heyman, Billy Rose)–2:08
8. "Snuggled on Your Shoulder" (Carmen Lombardo, Joe Young)–3:43
9. "You're My Thrill" (Jay Gorney, Sidney Clare)–1:56
10. "Lover Man" (Jimmy Davis, Ram Ramirez, Jimmy Sherman)–2:34
11. "Body and Soul" (Johnny Green, Edward Heyman, Robert Sour, Frank Eyton)–2:25
12. "Make Love to Me" (Paul Mann, Stephan Weiss, Kim Gannon)–2:31

== Selected personnel ==
- Julie London - vocals
- Al Viola - guitar
- Russ Garcia - arranger, conductor
