= Send for Me (album) =

Studio album by Julie London
- Released: 1961
- Recorded: Late 1960
- Genre: Traditional pop
- Length: 28:51
- Label: Liberty
- Producer: Si Waronker

Julie London chronology
Around Midnight (1960)	Send for Me (1961)	Whatever Julie Wants (1961)

Professional ratings
Review scores
Source	Rating
Allmusic	4/5 stars

Send for Me is an LP album by Julie London, released by Liberty Records under catalog number LRP-3171 as a monophonic recording in 1961, and later in stereo under catalog number LST-7171 in 1961. Jimmy Rowles was the orchestra conductor.

== Track listing ==
Track	Song	Songwriter(s)	Time
1	"Evenin'"	Harry White, Mitchell Parish	2:40
2	"What's Your Story, Morning Glory?"	Mary Lou Williams, Jack Lawrence, Paul Francis Webster	2:45
3	"Get on the Right Track"	Ray Charles, Titus Turner	2:07
4	"I Must Have That Man"	Jimmy McHugh, Dorothy Fields	2:15
5	"T'ain't What You Do (It's the Way That You Do It)"	Sy Oliver, Trummy Young	2:05
6	"Baby Come Home"	Bobby Troup, Jimmy Rowles	2:40
7	"Every Day I Have the Blues"	Pinetop Sparks, Milton or Marion Sparks	2:42
8	"Yes Indeed"	Sy Oliver	2:03
9	"Gee, Baby, Ain't I Good to You?"	Andy Razaf, Don Redman	1:52
10	"Cheatin' on Me"	Lew Pollack, Jack Yellen	1:55
11	"Trav'lin' Light"	Trummy Young, Jimmy Mundy, Johnny Mercer	3:02
12	"Send for Me"	Ollie Jones	2:45

- Arrangements and Orchestra by Jimmy Rowles
