= Alan Rankin Jones =

American jazz pianist and composer

- Born: 1902
- Died: 1945 (aged 42–43)
- Genres: Jazz
- Occupations: Composer; pianist; lyricist
- Instruments: Piano

Alan Rankin Jones (died 1945) was an American jazz pianist, composer, and lyricist best known for his composition "Easy Street".

== Music ==
Jones composed "Easy Street" in 1940. It was first recorded by 'Jimmy Lunceford and his Orchestra.' Around four years later in Coney Island (during the summer of 1944), Jones collaborated with Lou Springer and composed the melody for "Don’t Go Away Any More, Elinore" and "Make the Two of Us One" for Tom McKee, who wrote the lyrics.
