= Easy Street (Alan Rankin Jones song) =

American jazz standard

Song
- Written: 1940
- Songwriter(s): Alan Rankin Jones

"Easy Street" is a jazz standard and popular song with lyrics and music written by Alan Rankin Jones in 1940. It was first recorded by 'Jimmy Lunceford and his Orchestra.'

== Background ==
The term 'easy street' originated in the late 1800s and is slang for "a state in which everything is going well and one is comfortable.” It's usually meant momentarily.

== Musical characteristics ==
Easy Street is in thirty-two bar form and includes a melody that moves the title line to different pitches whenever it recurs in a phrase. The song is usually played with a slow, slightly swinging melody.
