= London by Night (album) =

Studio album by Julie London
- Released: December 1958
- Recorded: May 1957–November 1958
- Studio: Liberty Studios, Hollywood, California
- Genre: Traditional pop, vocal jazz
- Length: 31:40
- Label: Liberty
- Producer: Bobby Troup

Julie London chronology
Julie Is Her Name, Volume II (1958)	London by Night (1958)	Swing Me an Old Song (1959)

London by Night is an LP album by Julie London, released by Liberty Records under catalog numbers LRP-3105 in monaural and LST-7105 in stereophonic form in 1958. The accompaniment was by Pete King and His Orchestra.

The album was reissued, combined with the 1958 Julie London album About the Blues, in compact disc form in 2001 by EMI.

== Track listing ==
Track #	Song	Songwriter(s)	Time
1	Well, Sir	Bobby Troup, John Lehmann	3:09
2	That's for Me	Richard Rodgers, Oscar Hammerstein II	2:26
3	Mad About the Boy	Noël Coward	2:11
4	In the Middle of a Kiss	Sam Coslow	2:19
5	Just the Way I Am	Bobby Troup	2:43
6	My Man's Gone Now	George and Ira Gershwin, DuBose Heyward	3:50
7	Something I Dreamed Last Night	Sammy Fain, Jack Yellen, Herbert Magidson	2:36
8	Pousse Cafe	Earle Hagen, Herbert Spencer	2:53
9	Nobody's Heart	Richard Rodgers, Lorenz Hart	2:20
10	The Exciting Life	Earle Hagen, Herbert Spencer	2:31
11	That Old Feeling	Sammy Fain, Lew Brown	2:29
12	Cloudy Morning	Marvin Fisher, Joseph McCarthy	2:13

== Selected personnel ==
- Julie London – vocals
- Howard Roberts - guitar
- Al Viola - guitar
- Red Callender - double bass
- Felix Slatkin - violin
- Eleanor Slatkin - cello
- Pete King – arranger
