= Your Number Please =

Studio album by Julie London
- Released: 1959
- Recorded: Aug–Sep 1959
- Genre: Traditional pop
- Length: 39:05
- Label: Liberty
- Producer: Bobby Troup

Julie London chronology
Swing Me an Old Song (1959)	Your Number Please (1959)	Julie...At Home (1960)

Your Number Please is an LP album by Julie London, released by Liberty Records under catalog number LRP 3130. It was arranged and conducted by André Previn.

== Track listing ==
1. "Makin' Whoopee" - (Walter Donaldson, Gus Kahn)–2:46
2. "It Could Happen to You" - (Jimmy Van Heusen, Johnny Burke)–3:13
3. "When I Fall In Love" - (Victor Young, Edward Heyman)–3:23
4. "It's a Blue World" - (George Forest, Robert Wright)–2:24
5. "They Can't Take That Away from Me" - (George Gershwin, Ira Gershwin)–3:09
6. "One for My Baby" - (Harold Arlen, Johnny Mercer)–4:11
7. "Angel Eyes" - (Matt Dennis, Earl Brent)–3:57
8. "Love Is Here to Stay" - (George Gershwin, Ira Gershwin)–3:18
9. "The More I See You" - (Harry Warren, Mack Gordon)–3:03
10. "A Stranger In Town" - (Mel Tormé)–3:00
11. "Two Sleepy People" - (Hoagy Carmichael, Frank Loesser)–3:15
12. "Learnin' the Blues" - (Dolores Vicki Silvers)–3:26
