= You Better Go Now =

Song
- Released: 1936
- Genre: Jazz
- Songwriters: Bickley Reichner, Irvin Graham

"You Better Go Now" is a jazz standard written by Bickley Reichner and Irvin Graham. It was released in 1936, and written for the musical New Faces of 1937. It has been covered by many notable jazz singers, with probably the most known version sung by Billie Holiday in 1945, with a live version recorded at Carnegie Hall in New York City in 1947. and another live version with the Percy Faith and the Woolworth Orchestra in 1957 for the CBS radio show The Woolworth Jazz Hour (although some sources erroneously state the recording date as December 9, 1956). The first recorded performance of the song was by Katharyn Mayfield with Robert Bard in 1936 in the musical New Faces of 1936. The lyrics express intense attraction between the singer and her partner, but the singer urges her partner to leave because she likes them "much too much," suggesting a desire to avoid inevitable heartbreak or complications.

== Cover versions ==
Some notable covers of the song:

- Fairchild and Carroll and their Orchestra
- Jeri Southern
- Billy Daniels with Russ Case and his orchestra
- Hugh Shannon
- Beryl Booker
- Peggy King
- La Vergne
- Monica Lewis with Jack Kelly and his Ensemble
- Ethel Ennis
- Pia Beck
- Caterina Valente
- Polly Bergen
- Della Reese
- Norma Bengell
- Johnny April
- Johnny Mathis
- Pat Suzuki with Ralph Burns and his orchestra
- Buddy Greco
- Etta Jones and Strings with Oliver Nelson (conductor)
- Dakota Staton
- George Maharis
- Jack Jones
- Carmen Mcrae
- Rita Graham
- Helen Merrill with Teddy Wilson
- Martha Miyake
- Mark Murphy
