= Around Midnight =

Studio album by Julie London
- Released: 1960
- Recorded: August 1960
- Studio: Capitol Studios, Los Angeles, CA
- Genre: Jazz standards, big band
- Length: 35:16
- Label: Liberty
- Producer: Si Waronker

Julie London chronology
Julie...At Home (1960)	Around Midnight (1960)	Send for Me (1961)

Around Midnight is an LP album by Julie London, released by Liberty Records under catalog number LRP-3164 as a monophonic recording in 1960, and later in stereo under catalog number LST-7164 the same year. It was released a number of times on CD from 1998.

Dick Reynolds did the arrangements and conducted the orchestra.

== Track listing ==
1. "'Round Midnight" – (Thelonious Monk, Cootie Williams, Bernie Hanighen) – 2:54
2. "Lonely Night in Paris" – (Bobby Troup, Bob Alcivar) – 2:12
3. "Misty" – (Erroll Garner, Johnny Burke) – 3:11
4. "Black Coffee" – (Sonny Burke, Paul Francis Webster) – 2:58
5. "Lush Life" – (Billy Strayhorn) – 1:41
6. "In the Wee Small Hours of the Morning" – (David Mann, Bob Hilliard) – 2:49
7. "Don't Smoke in Bed" – (Willard Robison) – 2:25
8. "You and the Night and the Music" – (Arthur Schwartz, Howard Dietz) – 2:40
9. "Something Cool" – (Billy Barnes) – 4:38
10. "How About Me?" – (Irving Berlin) – 4:07
11. "But Not for Me" – (George Gershwin, Ira Gershwin) – 2:24
12. "The Party's Over" – (Jule Styne, Betty Comden, Adolf Green) – 3:17
