= Make Love to Me (1941 song) =

Single by Helen Forrest with the Harry James Orchestra
- Released: 1942
- Songwriter(s): Paul Mann, Stephan Weiss, Kim Gannon

"Make Love to Me" is the title of a 1941 song with music by Paul Mann and Stephan Weiss, and lyrics by Kim Gannon. It was recorded in 1942 by Helen Forrest with the Harry James Orchestra. It has also been performed by June Christy, Ella Fitzgerald and Julie London.
