= Julie...At Home =

Studio album by Julie London
- Released: 1960
- Recorded: Los Angeles, March 4, 1960
- Genre: Jazz
- Length: 29:34
- Label: Liberty
- Producer: Si Waronker

Julie London chronology
Your Number Please (1959)	Julie...At Home (1960)	Around Midnight (1960)

Julie...At Home is an LP album by Julie London, released by Liberty Records under catalog number LRP-3152 as a monophonic recording in 1960, and later in stereo under catalog number LST-7152 the same year.

== Track listing ==
Track	Song	Songwriter(s)	Time
1	"You'd Be So Nice to Come Home To"	Cole Porter	2:15
2	"Lonesome Road"	Nathaniel Shilkret, Gene Austin	2:24
3	"They Didn't Believe Me"	Jerome Kern, Gene Austin	2:19
4	"By Myself"	Arthur Schwartz, Howard Dietz	1:42
5	"The Thrill Is Gone"	Ray Henderson, Lew Brown	3:21
6	"You've Changed"	Bill Carey, Carl Fischer	2:45
7	"Goodbye"	Gordon Jenkins	2:23
8	"Sentimental Journey"	Les Brown, Ben Homer, Bud Green	2:26
9	"Give Me the Simple Life"	Rube Bloom, Harry Ruby	2:03
10	"You Stepped Out of a Dream"	Nacio Herb Brown, Gus Kahn	2:13
11	"Let There Be Love"	Lionel Rand, Ian Grant	2:03
12	"Everything Happens to Me"	Tom Adair, Matt Dennis	3:40

== Personnel ==
- Julie London - vocals
- Bob Flanigan - trombone (tracks 4 & 10)
- Jimmy Rowles - piano
- Emil Richards - vibraphone (at the conclusion of "You Stepped Out of a Dream," Richards plays a long quote from "Well, You Needn't" by Thelonious Monk)
- Al Viola - guitar
- Don Bagley - bass
- Earl Palmer - drums

Recorded in Julie London's living room.
