= By Myself (Julie London album) =

Studio album by Julie London
- Released: 1965
- Genre: Traditional pop
- Label: Liberty

Julie London chronology
Feeling Good (1965)	By Myself (1965)	All Through the Night: Julie London Sings the Choicest of Cole Porter (1965)

By Myself is an LP album by Julie London, released by Liberty Records for Columbia House Record Club under catalog number MCR-1 as a monophonic recording and catalog number SCR-1 in stereo in 1965.

== Track listing ==
1. "You'd Be So Nice to Come Home To" - (Cole Porter) - 2:13
2. "The Thrill Is Gone" - (Roy Hawkins, Rick Darnell) - 3:20
3. "It Never Entered My Mind" - (Richard Rodgers, Lorenz Hart) - 2:25
4. "Where or When" - (Richard Rodgers, Lorenz Hart) - 2:35
5. "By Myself" - (Arthur Schwartz, Howard Dietz) - 4:12
6. "They Can't Take That Away from Me" - (George Gershwin, Ira Gershwin) - 3:06
7. "Love Is Here to Stay" - (George Gershwin, Ira Gershwin) - 3:17
8. "Bewitched" - (Richard Rodgers, Lorenz Hart) - 2:54
9. "A Cottage for Sale" - (Willard Robison, Larry Conley) - 2:35
10. "I Love Paris" - (Cole Porter) - 2:14
