= Whatever Julie Wants =

Studio album by Julie London
- Released: August 1961
- Recorded: Spring 1961
- Genres: Vocal jazz, traditional pop
- Label: Liberty
- Producer: Felix Slatkin

Julie London chronology
Send for Me (1961)	Whatever Julie Wants (1961)	The Best of Julie (1962)

Whatever Julie Wants is an LP album by Julie London, released by Liberty Records under catalog number LRP-3192 as a monophonic recording and catalog number LST-7192 in stereo in 1961.

For the cover photograph of this release, Julie London had herself photographed in furs, jewels, and $750,000 in U.S. bills. A team of armed police officers were also present on the set.

== Track listing ==
1. "Why Don't You Do Right?" (Kansas Joe McCoy) – 2:17
2. "My Heart Belongs to Daddy" (Cole Porter) – 2:41
3. "Hard Hearted Hannah" (Jack Yellen, Bob Bigelow, Charles Bates, Milton Ager) – 1:56
4. "Do It Again" (George Gershwin, Buddy DeSylva) – 2:19
5. "Take Back Your Mink" (Frank Loesser) – 2:21
6. "Diamonds Are a Girl's Best Friend" (Jule Styne, Leo Robin) – 1:59
7. "Daddy" (Bobby Troup) – 2:12
8. "An Occasional Man" (Hugh Martin, Ralph Blane) – 2:29
9. "Love for Sale" (Cole Porter) – 2:40
10. "Always True to You in My Fashion" (Cole Porter) – 2:25
11. "There'll Be Some Changes Made" (Benton Overstreet, William Blackstone) – 2:25
12. "Tired" (Doris Fisher, Allan Roberts) – 2:38

Orchestra produced by Felix Slatkin.
