= All Through the Night: Julie London Sings the Choicest of Cole Porter =

Studio album by Julie London
- Released: 1965
- Recorded: July 12, 13, 16, 1965; Pacific Jazz Studios, Los Angeles, California
- Genre: West Coast jazz, cool jazz, vocal jazz
- Label: Liberty
- Producer: Richard Bock

Julie London chronology
By Myself (1965)	All Through the Night: Julie London Sings the Choicest of Cole Porter (1965)	For the Night People (1966)

All Through the Night: Julie London Sings the Choicest of Cole Porter is an LP album by Julie London, released by Liberty Records in 1965 under catalog number LRP-3434 as a monophonic recording and catalog number LST-7434 in stereo. She was accompanied by the Bud Shank Quintet.

== Track listing ==
(all songs by Cole Porter)

Track	Song	Time
1	"I've Got You Under My Skin"	3:00
2	"You Do Something to Me"	2:15
3	"Get Out of Town"	2:55
4	"All Through the Night"	4:32
5	"So in Love"	4:03
6	"At Long Last Love"	3:27
7	"Easy to Love"	2:27
8	"My Heart Belongs to Daddy"	2:45
9	"Ev'ry Time We Say Goodbye"	3:20
10	"In the Still of the Night"	2:34

== Personnel ==
- Julie London - vocals
- Bud Shank - alto saxophone, flute
- Joe Pass - guitar
- Monty Budwig - bass
- Russ Freeman - piano, arrangements
- Colin Bailey - drums
