= Sheraton New York Times Square Hotel =

Hotel in Manhattan, New York

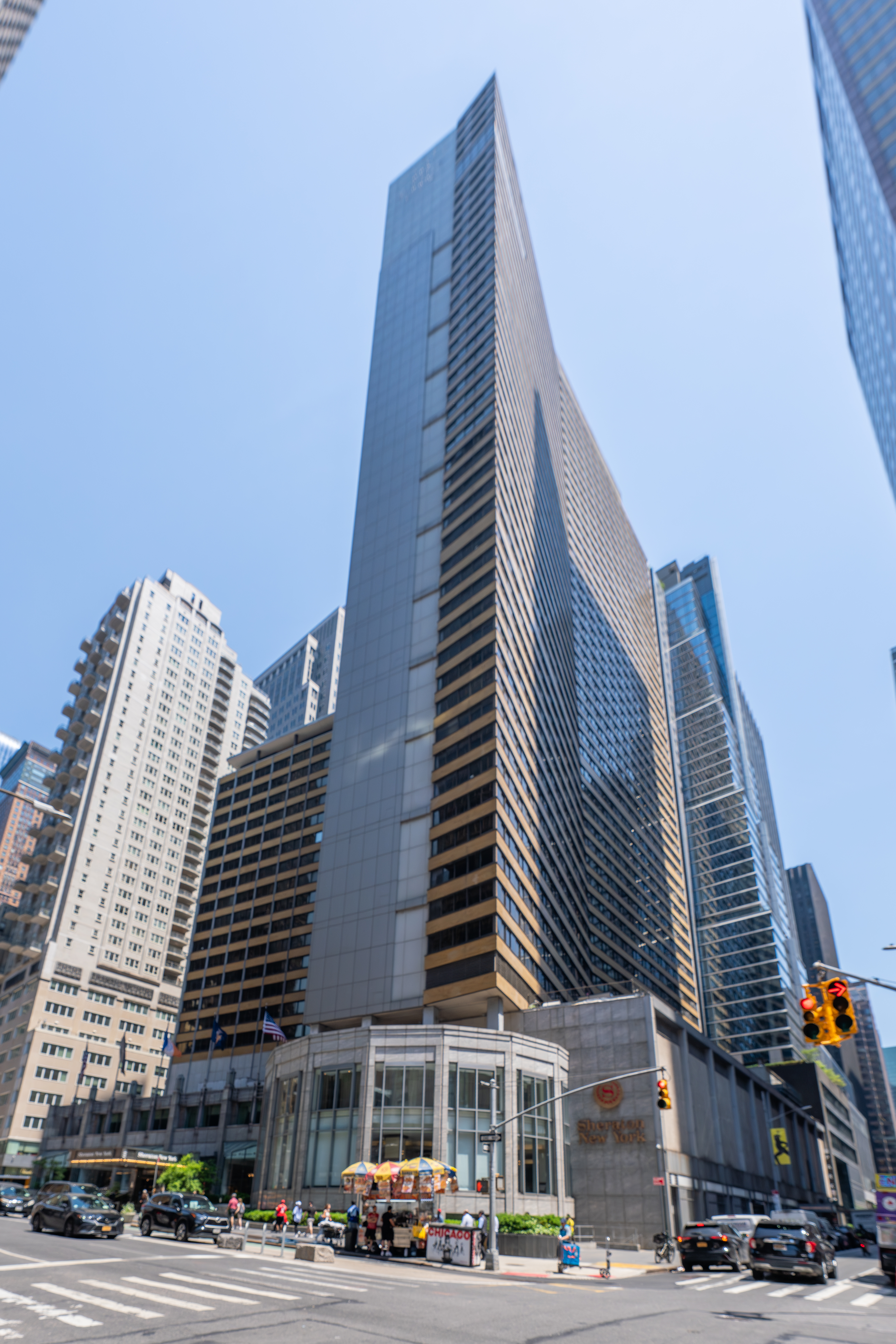
- Interactive map of the Sheraton New York Times Square Hotel area
- Hotel chain: Sheraton Hotels and Resorts

General information
- Location: New York, NY, 811 Seventh Avenue
- Coordinates: 40.7625°N 73.9817°W
- Opening: September 25, 1962
- Owner: MCR Hotels & Island Capital Group
- Operator: Sheraton Hotels and Resorts

Height
- Height: 501 ft (153 m)

Technical details
- Floor count: 51
- Floor area: 178,660 ft^{2} (16,598 m^{2})

Design and construction
- Architects: Morris Lapidus & Associates; Kornblath, Harle & Liebman

Other information
- Number of rooms: 1,780

The Sheraton New York Times Square Hotel is a 501 ft (153 m), 51-story hotel located near Times Square in Midtown Manhattan, New York City. It faces 7th Avenue, 52nd Street, and 53rd Street. It is one of the world's 100 tallest hotels, and one of the tallest hotels in New York City.

The hotel was opened in 1962 as the Americana of New York. It was sold to Sheraton in 1979 and renamed Sheraton Centre Hotel & Towers and later Sheraton New York Hotel and Towers. In 2005, it was sold to Host Marriott, with a name change to Sheraton New York Hotel in 2012 and then Sheraton New York Times Square Hotel in 2013. It was again sold in 2022 to current owners MCR Hotels and Island Capital Group.

== Site ==
The Sheraton New York Times Square Hotel is located at 811 Seventh Avenue in the Midtown Manhattan neighborhood of New York City, New York, U.S. The building's rectangular land lot occupies the western half of the city block bounded by Seventh Avenue to the west, 52nd Street to the south, Sixth Avenue (Avenue of the Americas) to the east, and 53rd Street to the north. The site covers 60,775 square feet (5,646.2 m^{2}), with a frontage of 200 feet (61 m) on Seventh Avenue and 305 feet (93 m) along the side streets. Nearby buildings include 810 Seventh Avenue to the west; the New York Hilton to the northeast; Flatotel New York City and Credit Lyonnais Building to the east; and Axa Equitable Center to the south.

The site had previously been occupied by the Manhattan Storage and Warehouse Company, built in 1892 to designs by James E. Ware. The warehouse, designed in the Italianate style, was demolished in 1957.

== History ==
=== Americana of New York ===
The Americana of New York was designed by Morris Lapidus, Liebman & Associates in 1960–1962. It was constructed by brothers Laurence Tisch and Preston Tisch, co-owners of the Loews Corporation.

The hotel was developed to serve the large business and convention market in New York City. At the time, many of the city's hotels were competing with each other to host large conventions. The occupancy rates of the city's hotels had declined from 96 percent in 1946 to 75 percent in 1961, but conventions could attract large numbers of guests, even if only for a short time. In August 1960, the Tisch brothers acquired the Manhattan Storage Warehouse site on the eastern side of Seventh Avenue between 52nd and 53rd Streets. The same month, Loew's announced plans for the Americana. The project would contain 2,000 rooms and, at 50 stories tall, would be the tallest hotel in the world. Morris Lapidus was hired to design the new hotel, which was planned to open in May 1962 at a cost of $50 million. Loew's had been developing the Summit Hotel on Lexington Avenue, which was renamed from the Americana to avoid confusion with the newer project. Loew's was also simultaneously developing two motels and a luxury apartment building in Manhattan.

Construction began in September 1960, and the builders brought an elephant to the site to pour champagne into the concrete foundation. E. C. Sherry was hired the next month to direct sales at the hotel. Lapidus, who had also been designing the nearby New York Hilton, resigned from the Hilton project by the end of 1960 to avoid a conflict of interest. Concrete pouring had commenced in July 1961 when all of the building's concrete workers went on strike, which lasted for eight weeks. All construction at the hotel was paused during the strike, since the hotel was being built using a concrete frame.

The concrete work finally began in late 1961, and the concrete superstructure was initially built at a rate of one story every three days. Above floor 29, one story was completed every two days. In November 1961, workers hosted a party to celebrate the completion of the main ballroom's floor, which Loew's dubbed "the world's largest ballroom". Loew's Hotels vice president Claude Philippe and actress Barbara Eden attended the hotel's topping out ceremony on May 8, 1962, when a maple tree was hosted to the top floor. The hotel ultimately cost $45 million to construct. Claude Philippe served as the hotel's manager for only one year after it opened, resigning in 1963.

The Americana of New York opened on September 24, 1962, following a press preview on September 20. Francis Cardinal Spellman, cardinal of the Roman Catholic Archdiocese of New York, blessed the Americana when it was completed. It was the city's first hotel with more than 1,000 rooms since the Waldorf Astoria in 1931. Lilly Daché operated a beauty salon in the hotel when it opened. As at the Summit, the Americana required that many staff members be able to speak several languages. One of four employees in the hotel's front offices could speak more than one language. The hotel's concierge service included staff members who could speak Spanish, French, German, and Italian. When the Americana opened, its managers claimed that the hotel had received 250 bookings, some as far as four years in advance, worth a cumulative $10 million. This was attributed to the proximity of the Broadway Theater District and of the shopping areas on Fifth and Madison Avenues, as well as the fact that many people were visiting the upcoming 1964 New York World's Fair.

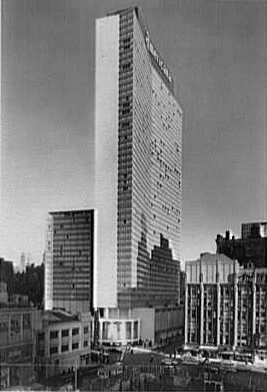
Americana of New York, 1962

Shortly after the Americana opened, officials conducted an extensive inspection of the hotel after detecting several building-code violations. The hotel's Royal Box nightclub was renovated in early 1963, having opened in October 1962 with a performance by Harry Belafonte. The hotel hosted several events, such as the 1963 Tony Awards, which were held in the Imperial Ballroom on April 28, 1963. John Lennon and Paul McCartney announced the formation of their music label Apple Corps at a press conference in the Americana in 1968. In addition, the Americana also hosted the New York portion of the Emmy Awards in 1967 and again in 1968. The Royal Box hosted performances by musical artists including Harry Belafonte, Nancy Ames, Thelma Houston, Duke Ellington, Ella Fitzgerald, and Peggy Lee; it also hosted other performers such as comedian Woody Allen.

On July 21, 1972, American Airlines leased the Americana of New York from Loews, as well as the City Squire Motor Inn across the street, and the Americana Hotels in Bal Harbour, Florida, and San Juan, Puerto Rico, for a period of thirty years. American merged the hotels with their existing Flagship Hotels chain (part of their wholly owned Sky Chefs catering division), and marketed all the properties under the Americana Hotels brand. The Americana hosted the 1974 NFL draft and served as Democratic headquarters for the 1976 Democratic National Convention and 1980 Democratic National Convention.

=== Sheraton ===
The Americana of New York and the City Squire were sold to a partnership of Sheraton Hotels and the Equitable Life Assurance Society on January 24, 1979. The Americana was renamed the Sheraton Centre Hotel & Towers. Sheraton bought out Equitable's share in the hotel in 1990, freeing them to undertake a nearly $200 million renovation in 1991, when the hotel was renamed the Sheraton New York Hotel and Towers. Following the September 11 attacks in 2001, Lehman Brothers' Investment Banking division temporarily converted the first-floor lounges, restaurants, and 665 guestrooms of the hotel into office space.

Starwood Hotels (which had bought Sheraton in 1998) sold the hotel on November 14, 2005, to Host Marriott for $738 million, as part of a $4 billion transaction that included 37 other hotel properties. The hotel continued to be managed by Sheraton, however, and was again renovated from 2011 to 2012 at a cost of $160 million. The name was shortened to Sheraton New York Hotel in 2012 and then changed to Sheraton New York Times Square Hotel in 2013. In 2018, Host Hotels & Resorts attempted to sell the hotel, without success, for $550 million. By 2020, the price had dropped to $495 million. Host sold the hotel to MCR Hotels and Island Capital Group in March 2022 for $373 million, just over half of the price Host had paid in 2005. MCR took over the previous owner's $250 million loan on the hotel; the loan went into forbearance after it matured in October 2023. MCR and Island Capital refinanced the hotel the next month with a $260 million loan from firms associated with the Fortress Investment Group.

== Architecture ==
The Americana was one of at least eight hotels that Loews Hotels developed in Manhattan during the early 1960s, as well as one of four developed by Morris Lapidus. The Diesel Construction Company was the hotel's general contractor, and Farkas & Barron was the structural engineer.

=== Form and facade ===
At 51 floors, with a height of 501 feet (153 m), the hotel was acclaimed for many years in its advertising and by the media as the tallest hotel in the world, based on the number and height of its inhabited floors. (Note: The spire of the 1957 Hotel Ukraina in Moscow was taller.)

The base is three stories high and contains the hotel's public rooms. The main entrance, on Seventh Avenue, occupies the northern part of the hotel's Seventh Avenue elevation, near 53rd Street. It originally contained a full-height glass wall and was slightly angled from the street grid. The main entrance was also covered with a canopy that contained infrared lamps, which heated the entrance during winter. A two-story semicircular rotunda projects from the southern part of the Seventh Avenue elevation, near 52nd Street. This rotunda contained the hotel's restaurants. The sidewalk on all sides of the rotunda originally had striped paving. Under the sidewalks were electric cables that could melt snow and ice.

The main part of the Sheraton is a 47-story slab, which is bent in the center. The western part of the massing is angled toward the corner of Seventh Avenue and 52nd Street, while the eastern part runs parallel to the Manhattan street grid. The hotel was designed in this way because zoning regulations prohibited the upper stories from being built any closer to 52nd Street. On the north side, a 25-story wing is perpendicular to the western part of the slab (and slightly angled from the street grid). Lapidus said the bent massing strengthened the upper stories against wind forces, rather than being intended for aesthetic effect. Architectural Forum said the slab looked "slim, tall, and elegant" from the east but had a completely different appearance from the west.

The slab is clad in yellow brick and marble. On the longer elevations of the slab, each story originally contained horizontal strips of windows, installed in stainless-steel frames. The windows on different floors are separated by spandrel panels of yellow glazed brick. The shorter elevations of the slab are clad with white Vermont marble. The building also used precast concrete Mo-Sai panels. The facades of the accommodation blocks are generally intact, but the podium levels were reclad in the 1991 renovation, replacing the varied, light 1960s details with Postmodern squared granite.

=== Features ===
The hotel's superstructure is composed of three structural systems. Floors 1–5 are made of steel members encased in concrete, since these stories contained large public spaces; these steel beams were anchored in the bedrock underneath the building. Floors 5–29 are composed of concrete shear walls for wind resistance. Floors 29–51 are supported by reinforced concrete columns. The concrete frame was both easier to pour and cheaper to build compared to a conventional steel frame. According to Lapidus, his previous projects had all used reinforced concrete, and he did not intend to use steel. At the time of its completion, the building was the tallest concrete-framed structure in the city. The hotel's concrete frame saved at least $1 million compared to a steel frame of similar size, since steel costs generally exceeded concrete costs by about $1 per square foot ($11/m^{2}).

==== Lowest stories ====
The lobby contained gold-and-white and teak furniture, as well as a floor made of white marble. There was a colonnade of white-marble columns with gold veins, supporting a ceiling with gold domes. In addition, a set of concrete arches supported a staircase that led to a lower lobby. This "floating staircase" was made of marble and bronze. The lobby also connected to a bank of elevators.

The hotel contained "nearly an acre of kitchens", which could accommodate up to 11,000 diners at once. There were seven kitchens, which took up four basement levels. The dining rooms were capable of accommodating 6,800 guests. The dining areas included the 60-foot-long (18 m) Wooden Indian men's bar, which was themed to the Old West and contained themed wooden carvings. The La Ronde cocktail lounge, housed within the semicircular rotunda, contained mirrored columns as well as damask tapestries. Wood, copper, and leather furnishings were used extensively in the Golden Spur restaurant. The hotel also contained a nightclub called the Royal Box, which had a capacity of 380 seats.

The main ballroom, known as the Imperial Ballroom, could fit 3,000 people at a banquet or 4,000 at a business dinner. It measured either 190 ft × 110 ft (58 m × 34 m) or 195 ft × 100 ft (59 m × 30 m). The room was extensively ornamented with bronze, gold-leaf, and marble decoration. The chandelier, which could be raised and lowered on a winch, cost $50,000. The Imperial Ballroom's projection booth could retract into the ceiling when it was not being used. There was also a hydraulically powered revolving stage, which covered 1,700 square feet (160 m^{2}) and could be lifted in four sections. A vehicle lift, which could fit two limousines simultaneously, connected the Imperial Ballroom with street level, allowing guests of honor to drive directly into the ballroom. There were two large sliding panels, allowing the Imperial Ballroom to be divided into three smaller spaces.

There were also three smaller ballrooms that fit up to 1,000 people; they were known as the Royal, Versailles, and Princess. The Royal (or Georgian) Ballroom could fit 1,200 guests and could be divided into a primary ballroom and a separate foyer. The Versailles Ballroom could fit 400 diners or 500 business guests, and the Princess Ballroom could fit 300 people. The exhibition hall spanned 30,000 square feet (2,800 m^{2}) at ground level. The hotel also had 38 private meeting rooms, each with a capacity of 25 to 500 people. The basement contained a parking garage with 350 spots. Also part of the hotel was a swimming pool on the 25th story.

==== Hotel rooms ====
When the hotel was developed, it contained 2,000 rooms, including 90 large suites. Originally, the smallest room in the Americana Hotel was a single-bedroom unit measuring 9.5 by 15 feet (2.9 by 4.6 m). By contrast, the hotel's largest unit had six bedrooms, a three-sided terrace, and its own butler and maid.

Lapidus designed most of the hotel's original furniture. These included lamps, portraits, and furniture, which were all designed in a mid-20th-century style. The hotel rooms were originally decorated in a white, blue, and gold color scheme, complementing the design of the lower stories. Lapidus also designed the carpets, which were installed across each room, extending into the closets. Each bedroom initially had its own thermostat, telephone, small refrigerator, and combination swivel/rocking chair, as well as a full-width window. In addition, rooms had their own radio, television, and Gideon Bible. Guests could use the televisions in their rooms to watch closed-circuit television footage of the ballrooms and exhibition areas.

Preceded by Belmont Plaza Hotel	Venues of the NFL draft 1973-1974	Succeeded by New York Hilton Midtown
