= The End of the World (Julie London album) =

Studio album by Julie London
- Released: May 1963
- Recorded: Aug–Sep 1962 ("Slightly Out Of Tune (Desafinado)" and Spring 1963
- Genre: Traditional pop, vocal jazz
- Label: Liberty
- Producer: Snuff Garrett

Julie London chronology
Latin in a Satin Mood (1963)	The End of the World (1963)	The Wonderful World of Julie London (1963)

The End of the World is an LP album by Julie London, released by Liberty Records under catalog number LRP-3300 as a monophonic recording and catalog number LST-7300 in stereo in June 1963. This was Julie London's second-to-last charting album, reaching number 127 on the Billboard charts.

This Julie London album is commonly mistaken to be entitled "The Good Life", due to mistitling on the album jacket's spine. This error happened again on her 1964 self-titled album "Julie London", when it was mistitled as "You Don't Have to Be a Baby to Cry/Wives and Lovers" on the album jacket's spine.

Ernie Freeman arranged and conducted the orchestra.

== Track listing ==
Track number	Title	Songwriter(s)	Time
1	"The End of the World"	Arthur Kent, Sylvia Dee	2:47
2	"I Wanna Be Around"	Sadie Vimmerstadt, Johnny Mercer	2:00
3	"Call Me Irresponsible"	Jimmy Van Heusen, Sammy Cahn	2:48
4	"Our Day Will Come"	Mort Garson, Bob Hilliard	2:22
5	"I Left My Heart in San Francisco"	George Cory, Douglas Cross	2:48
6	"Fly Me to the Moon"	Bart Howard	2:34
7	"Days of Wine and Roses"	Henry Mancini, Johnny Mercer	2:53
8	"I Remember You"	Victor Schertzinger, Mercer	2:36
9	"My Coloring Book"	John Kander, Fred Ebb	3:32
10	"Chances Are"	Robert Allen, Al Stillman	3:00
11	"Slightly Out Of Tune (Desafinado)"	Antônio Carlos Jobim, Jessie Cavanaugh, Jon Hendricks, Newton Mendonça	2:06
12	"The Good Life"	Sacha Distel, Jack Reardon	2:54
