= Love Letters (Julie London album) =

Studio album by Julie London
- Released: April 1962
- Recorded: October 1958 ("Come On-a My House") and March 1962
- Genre: Vocal jazz, traditional pop
- Label: Liberty
- Producer: Snuff Garrett

Julie London chronology
Sophisticated Lady (1962)	Love Letters (1962)	Love on the Rocks (1963)

Professional ratings
Review scores
Source	Rating
New Record Mirror	4/5 stars

Love Letters is an LP album by Julie London, released by Liberty Records under catalog number LRP-3231 as a monophonic recording and catalog number LST-7231 in stereo in 1962.

Barney Kessel played guitar on "I Loves You, Porgy," in an arrangement that has similarities to both the 1948 Billie Holiday version and to the 1959 Nina Simone version of the song, though London sings the song in a slightly higher range than both Holiday and Simone. Ernie Freeman arranged three of the songs on the album.

== Track listing ==
Track	Song	Songwriter(s)	Time
1	"Love Letters"	Victor Young, Edward Heyman	2:51
2	"The Second Time Around"	Jimmy Van Heusen, Sammy Cahn	3:01
3	"I Loves You, Porgy"	George Gershwin, Ira Gershwin	2:40
4	"What a Diff'rence a Day Made"	María Grever, Stanley Adams	2:03
5	"Never On Sunday"	Manos Hatzidakis, Billy Towne	2:21
6	"I Miss You So"	Jimmy Henderson, Sid Robin, Bertha Scott	2:36
7	"All the Way"	Jimmy Van Heusen, Sammy Cahn	2:32
8	"Come On-a My House"	Ross Bagdasarian, William Saroyan	2:36
9	"Hey There"	Richard Adler, Jerry Ross	2:07
10	"And That Reminds Me"	Camillo Bargoni, Al Stillman	2:18
11	"Fascination"	Fermo Dante Marchetti, Maurice de Féraudy, Dick Manning	1:57
12	"Broken Hearted Melody"	Sherman Edwards, Hal David	2:16
