= John of Portugal =

John of Portugal (Portuguese: João) is the name of several Portuguese kings and other members of the Portuguese Royal Family:

== Kings ==
- John I of Portugal (1357–1433)
- John II of Portugal (1455–1495)
- John III of Portugal (1502–1557)
- John IV of Portugal (1604–1656)
- John V of Portugal (1689–1750)
- John VI of Portugal (1767–1826)

== Infantes ==
- John, Duke of Valencia de Campos (c.1349–c.1396), son of Peter I of Portugal and Inês de Castro
- John, Constable of Portugal (1400–1442), son of John I of Portugal
- John of Coimbra, Prince of Antioch (1431–1457), son of Infante Pedro, Duke of Coimbra
- John, Hereditary Prince of Portugal (1451), son of Afonso V of Portugal
- João Manuel, Hereditary Prince of Portugal (1537–1554), son of John III of Portugal
- João, Prince of Brazil (1688), son of Peter II of Portugal
- Infante João Francisco of Portugal (1763), son of Maria I of Portugal and Peter III of Portugal
- João Carlos, Prince of Beira (1821–1822), son of Peter IV of Portugal (Peter I of Brazil)
- Infante João, Duke of Beja (1842–1861), son of Maria II and Ferdinand II of Portugal

== Others ==
- João de Portugal (Dominican) (active 1626), Portuguese Dominican friar in the Roman Catholic Diocese of Viseu
