= Jeri Southern =

American singer (1926–1991)

Background information
- Born: Genevieve Lillian Hering; August 5, 1926; Royal, Nebraska, U.S.
- Died: August 4, 1991 (aged 64) Los Angeles, California, U.S.
- Education: Duchesne Academy of the Sacred Heart
- Genres: Jazz, pop
- Occupations: Singer, musician
- Instruments: Vocals, piano
- Years active: 1944–1962
- Labels: Decca, Roulette, Capitol
- Spouse: Bill Holman (divorced)

Jeri Southern (born Genevieve Lillian Hering; August 5, 1926 – August 4, 1991) was an American jazz singer and pianist.

== Early years ==
Born Genevieve Lillian Hering in Royal, Nebraska, United States, Jeri Southern was the granddaughter of a German pig farmer who came to the United States in 1879. He built and operated a flour mill in Royal, which his son (Southern's father) continued to run until losing the business after the stock market crash of 1929. He found employment as elevator operator for the Farmers Union in Royal. Southern's secondary education was at Notre Dame Academy in Omaha, Nebraska, and she was attending voice lessons in those years. She began playing piano at the age of three, and when she was six years old began studying classical piano. She studied piano and voice at Duchesne Academy of the Sacred Heart, where she became interested in jazz.

== Career ==
After beginning her career at the Blackstone Hotel in Omaha, Southern joined a United States Navy recruiting tour during World War II. In the late 1940s, she worked in clubs in Chicago, where she had earlier played piano for singer Anita O'Day. During this period, Southern became known for her singing, particularly for her renditions of torch songs.

Southern signed a contract with Decca Records in 1951 and became known both for pop and jazz. She was the first to record "When I Fall in Love", accompanied by the song's composer Victor Young and his orchestra, in April 1952. In 1955, her recording of "An Occasional Man" reached number 89 on the Billboard magazine pop chart. She sang in films and in 1957 had a hit with "Fire Down Below", which peaked at number 22 on the UK Singles Chart in June 1957. After joining Capitol Records, she had success with interpretations of Cole Porter songs arranged by Billy May.

Will Friedwald writes that Southern's "specialty [was] understatement: some might even call her a minimalist." Bassist Charlie Haden said, "She sang the way she spoke, in the most pure, honest, and vulnerable ways. She bared her soul in her singing." In 1960, while working at The Crescendo, she collapsed on stage. She cancelled a subsequent tour and retired from singing.

== Personal life ==
Southern's marriage to jazz and pop musician Bill Holman ended in divorce. Her only child, Kathryn King, said performing had a negative psychological effect on Southern, and that that was the reason she stopped performing. In a 2010 newspaper article, King talked about Southern's shyness, saying she had "a paralyzing case of performance anxiety. Just contemplating performing made her enormously anxious and depressed."

== Death ==
Southern died of a heart attack in Los Angeles, California, in 1991, a day before her 65th birthday. She was diabetic and had been diagnosed with double pneumonia before her death.

== Discography ==
- Warm Intimate Songs in the Jeri Southern Style with Dave Barbour (Decca, 1954)
- The Southern Style (Decca, 1955)
- You Better Go Now (Decca, 1956)
- When Your Heart's on Fire (Decca, 1957)
- Jeri Gently Jumps (Decca, 1957)
- Jeri Southern Meets Johnny Smith (Roulette, 1958)
- A Prelude to a Kiss (Decca, 1958)
- Southern Breeze (Roulette, 1958)
- Coffee, Cigarettes & Memories (Roulette, 1958)
- Southern Hospitality (Decca, 1958)
- Jeri Southern Meets Cole Porter (Capitol, 1959)
- Jeri Southern at the Crescendo (Capitol, 1960)
- The Dream's on Jeri (Jasmine, 1998)
- The Very Thought of You: The Decca Years: 1951–1957 (GRP, 1999)
- Southern Hospitality/Jeri Gently Jumps (MCA, 1999)
- Romance in the Dark (Delta Music, 2009)
- The Complete Roulette and Capitol Recordings (Fresh Sound, 2014)
- Jeri Southern Blue Note, Chicago, March 1956 (Uptown, 2016)

=== As guest ===
- Shorty Rogers, The Shorty Rogers Quintet (Studio West, 1990)

== Bibliography ==
- Southern, Jeri (1978). Sheldon, Stan (ed.). Interpreting Popular Music at the Keyboard. Studio Publications. OCLC 7285736.
