= Julie London =

American actress and singer (1926–2000)

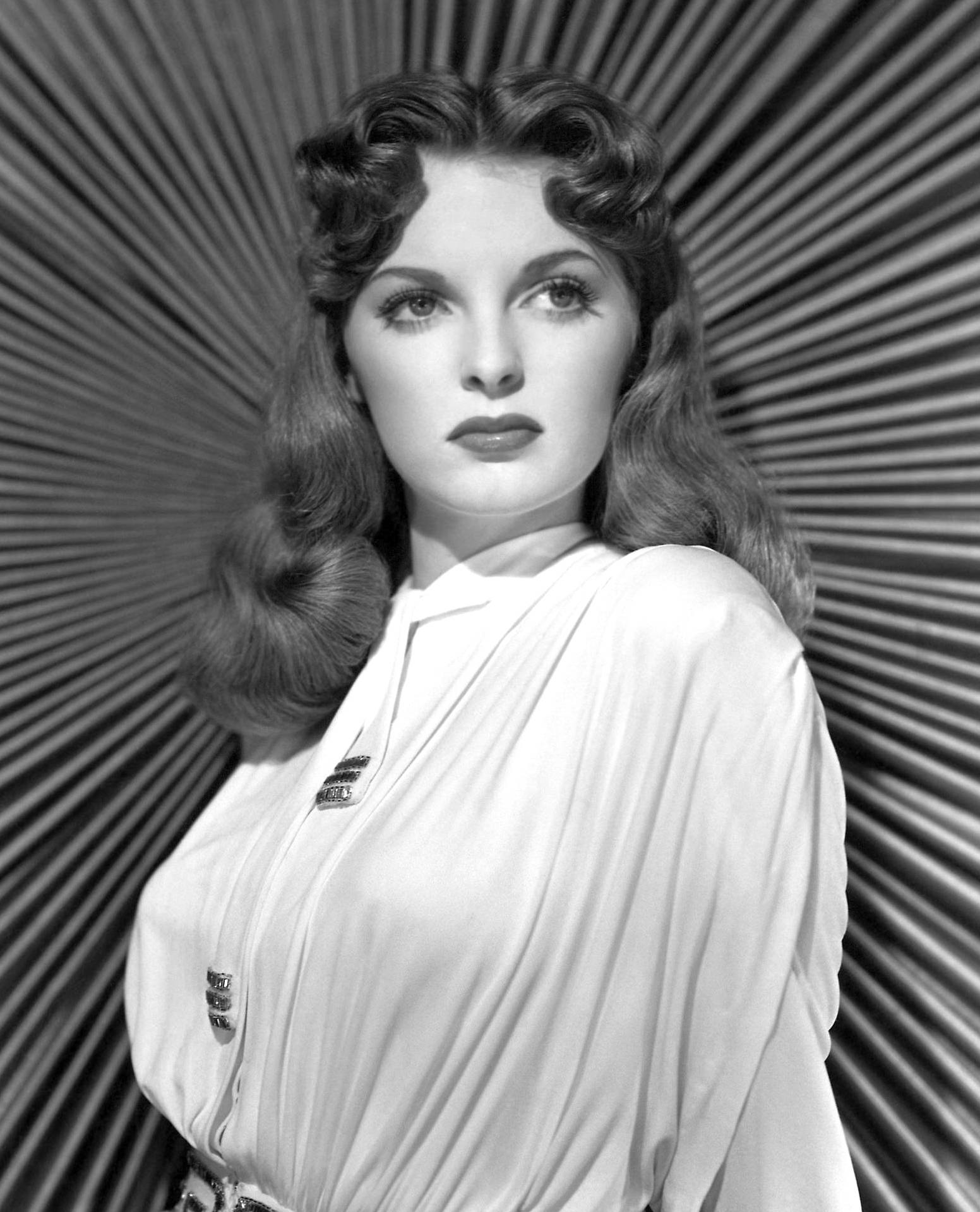
- London in 1948
- Born: Julie Peck; September 26, 1926; Santa Rosa, California, U.S.
- Died: October 18, 2000 (aged 74); Los Angeles, California, U.S.
- Resting place: Forest Lawn Memorial Park
- Education: Hollywood Professional School
- Occupations: Singer; actress; pin-up model
- Years active: 1944–1981
- Known for: Emergency!; Man of the West; The Wonderful Country
- Spouses: Jack Webb (m. 1947; div. 1954) Bobby Troup (m. 1959; died 1999)
- Children: 5
- Awards: Hollywood Walk of Fame
- Musical career
- Genres: Jazz; pop
- Labels: Bethlehem; Liberty; London; RCA

Julie London (née Peck; September 26, 1926 – October 18, 2000) was an American singer and actress whose career spanned more than 40 years. A torch singer noted for her contralto voice, London recorded over thirty albums of pop and jazz standards between 1955 and 1969. Her recording of "Cry Me a River", a song she introduced on her debut album Julie Is Her Name, was inducted into the Grammy Hall of Fame in 2001. In addition to her musical renown, London was nominated for a Golden Globe Award in 1974 for her portrayal of Nurse Dixie McCall in the television series Emergency!

Born in Santa Rosa, California, to vaudevillian parents, London was discovered while working as an elevator operator in downtown Los Angeles, and she began her career as an actress. London's 35-year acting career began in film in 1944 and included roles as the female lead in numerous Westerns, co-starring with Rock Hudson in The Fat Man (1951), with Robert Taylor and John Cassavetes in Saddle the Wind (1958), with Gary Cooper in Man of the West (1958) and with Robert Mitchum in The Wonderful Country (1959).

In the mid-1950s, London signed a recording contract with Liberty Records, marking the beginning of her professional musical career. She released her final studio album in 1969 but achieved continuing success by playing the female starring role of nurse Dixie McCall in the television series Emergency! (1972–1979), in which she acted with her husband, Bobby Troup. The show was produced by her ex-husband, Jack Webb.

== Early life ==
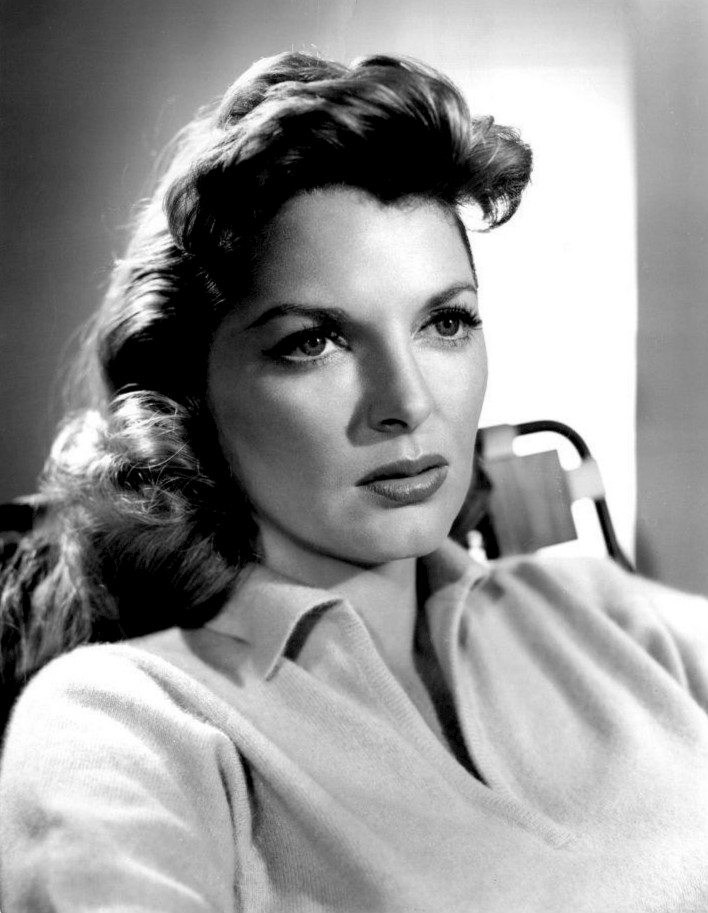
London appearance on The Garry Moore Show, 1958

London was born Julie Peck (Note: Though some sources list her birth name as Nancy Peck or Nancy Gayle, the California Birth Index corroborates her birth name as being Julie, listing the birth of Julie Peck on September 26, 1926 in Sonoma County, California, to a Mrs. Taylor. Searches with the California Birth Index for a "Nancy Peck" or "Nancy Gayle" do not return any results for her birth year of 1926. A Time magazine profile as well as her obituaries in both The Guardian and The New York Times confirmed this.) on September 26, 1926, in Santa Rosa, California, the only child of Josephine Rosalie Peck (née Taylor; 1905 – 1976) and Jack Peck (1901–1977), who were a vaudeville song-and-dance team. In 1929, when she was three years old, the family moved to San Bernardino, California, where she made her professional singing debut on her parents' radio program.

Throughout her early life, both London and her mother were admirers of Billie Holiday. London was described by friends and family as a shy child "without much self-confidence". In 1941, when she was 14, her family moved to Hollywood, California. In her teenage years, she began to sing in local nightclubs in Los Angeles. She graduated from the Hollywood Professional School in 1945 and worked as an elevator operator in downtown Los Angeles throughout high school.

== Career ==
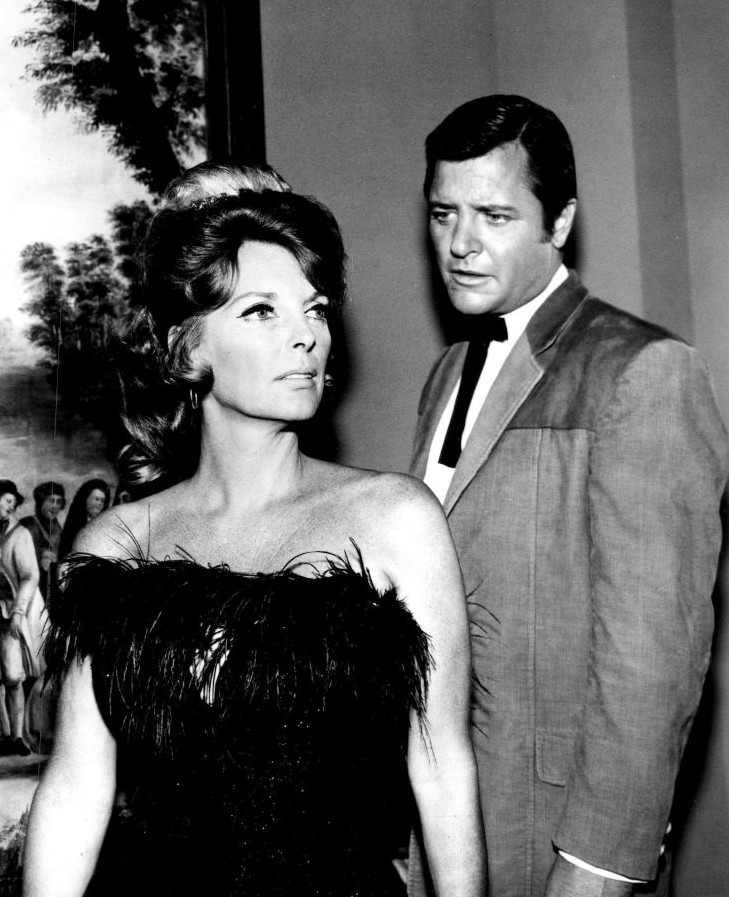
London and Richard Long in The Big Valley 1968

=== Discovery and early film roles ===
In 1943, London met Sue Carol, a talent agent and then-wife of actor Alan Ladd, while operating the elevator at Roos Bros., (Roos/Atkins), an upscale clothing store on Hollywood Boulevard. Struck by London's physical features, Carol facilitated a screen test for the inexperienced actress, and London signed a contract with her. London met Esquire photographer Henry Waxman while working her second job as a clerk at a menswear store, and he shot photographs of her that appeared in the magazine's November 1943 issue. These photos helped establish her as a pin-up girl during World War II.

She made her film debut while still in high school, appearing under the name Julie London in Nabonga in 1944. She later starred in the 1947 film The Red House with Edward G. Robinson. After a series of uncredited roles, she signed a contract with Warner Bros. Pictures, appearing in the war film Task Force (1949) and the Western Return of the Frontiersman (1950). She was cast in the lead role of Pat Boyd in the William Castle-directed The Fat Man (1951). London completed shooting the film in August 1950. After Warner Bros. dropped her contract, London was offered a contract with Universal Pictures based on the role, but turned it down, opting instead to focus on her marriage to actor Jack Webb.

=== Mainstream films and music ===
After divorcing Webb in 1954, London resumed her career, appearing in The Fighting Chance, filmed in May 1955 and released by 20th Century Fox. Earlier in 1955, London was spotted singing at a jazz club in Los Angeles by record producer Simon Waronker, who was recommended to her by her friend (and future husband) Bobby Troup. Despite London’s notable stage fright, Waronker was impressed by her vocals and delivery, and later recalled that "The lyrics poured out of her like a hurt bird." Waronker convinced London to pursue a recording career and signed her with Liberty Records. London recorded 32 albums in a career that began in 1955 with a live performance at the 881 Club in Los Angeles. Her debut album Julie Is Her Name was released in December of that year, and Billboard named her the most popular female vocalist for 1955, 1956, and 1957. She was the subject of a 1957 Life cover article in which she was quoted as saying "It's only a thimbleful of a voice, and I have to use it close to the microphone. But it is a kind of oversmoked voice, and it automatically sounds intimate."

London's debut recordings (which appeared on her self-titled extended play) were completed under the New York-based Bethlehem Records label. Four additional tracks recorded during these sessions were later included on the album Bethlehem's Girlfriends, a compilation album released in 1957. Bobby Troup was one of the session musicians on the album. London recorded the standards "Don't Worry About Me", "Motherless Child", "A Foggy Day", and "You're Blasé". "Cry Me a River", London's most famous single, was written by her high-school classmate Arthur Hamilton and produced by Troup. The recording became a million-seller after its release on her debut album in 1955.

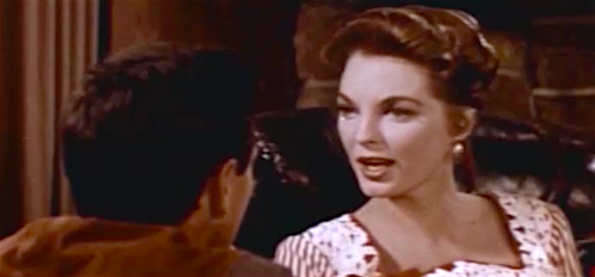
London with John Cassavetes in Saddle the Wind (1958)

While her music career earned her public notice, London also continued to appear in films, with lead roles in Crime Against Joe (1956) as well as appearing as herself in The Girl Can't Help It (1956), in which London performs three songs, including "Cry Me a River". The film was a box-office success and became one of the top-30 highest grossing films of 1956. London subsequently appeared in a television advertisement for Marlboro cigarettes, singing the "Marlboro Song". She appeared in several Westerns: In 1957, she appeared in Drango playing a Southern belle harboring fugitives, followed by a starring role opposite Gary Cooper in Man of the West, in which her character, the film's only woman, is abused and humiliated by an outlaw gang. The same year, she appeared as a pending bride in the Western Saddle the Wind; London's performance received critical acclaim in The New York Times. She appeared in The Wonderful Country in 1959, in which she plays a downtrodden wife of an army major.

In 1960, London released the album Julie...At Home, which was recorded at her residence in Los Angeles. The same year, she released Around Midnight, which incorporated a larger backing band in comparison to her previous releases. She released numerous albums on Liberty Records throughout the 1960s, including Whatever Julie Wants (1961), Love Letters (1962), The End of the World (1963), and All Through the Night (1965), the latter a collection of songs by Cole Porter.

=== Television work and final recordings ===
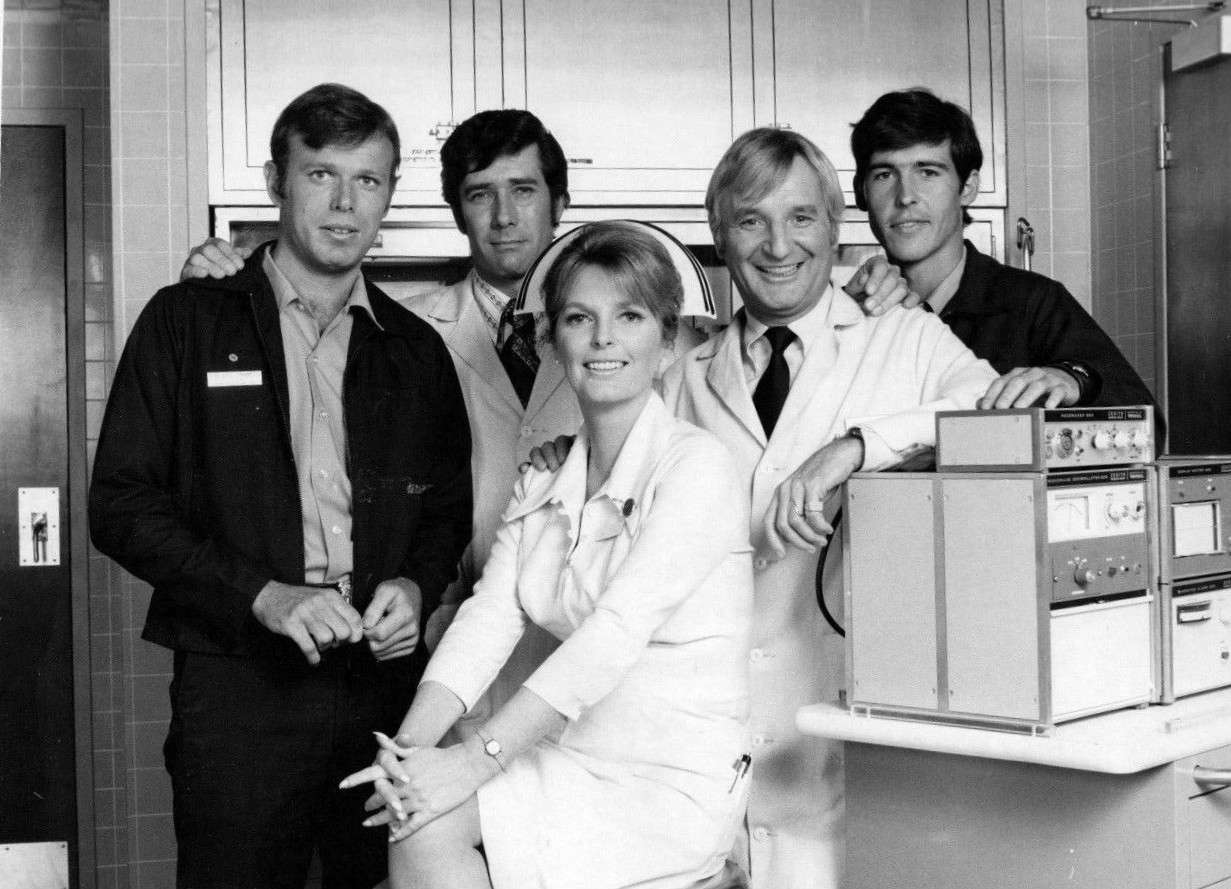
Cast of TV's Emergency! (1973), L-R: Kevin Tighe, Robert Fuller, Julie London, Bobby Troup and Randolph Mantooth

London appeared on numerous television series in the 1960s, including guest appearances on Rawhide (1960), Laramie (1960), I Spy (1965), Alfred Hitchcock Presents (1965) and The Big Valley (1968). She and second husband Bobby Troup frequently appeared as panelists on the game shows Tattletales, Hollywood Squares, and Masquerade Party in the 1970s. On May 28, 1964, she and Troup recorded a one-hour program for Japanese television in Japan. London sang 13 of her classic songs, including "Bye Bye Blackbird", "Lonesome Road", and "Cry Me a River". She released studio albums until the end of the decade, and her final studio album was Yummy, Yummy, Yummy (1969), a collection of contemporary songs. After this, London stopped singing professionally. She had lost significant vocal control due to years of smoking and drinking.

=== Emergency! ===
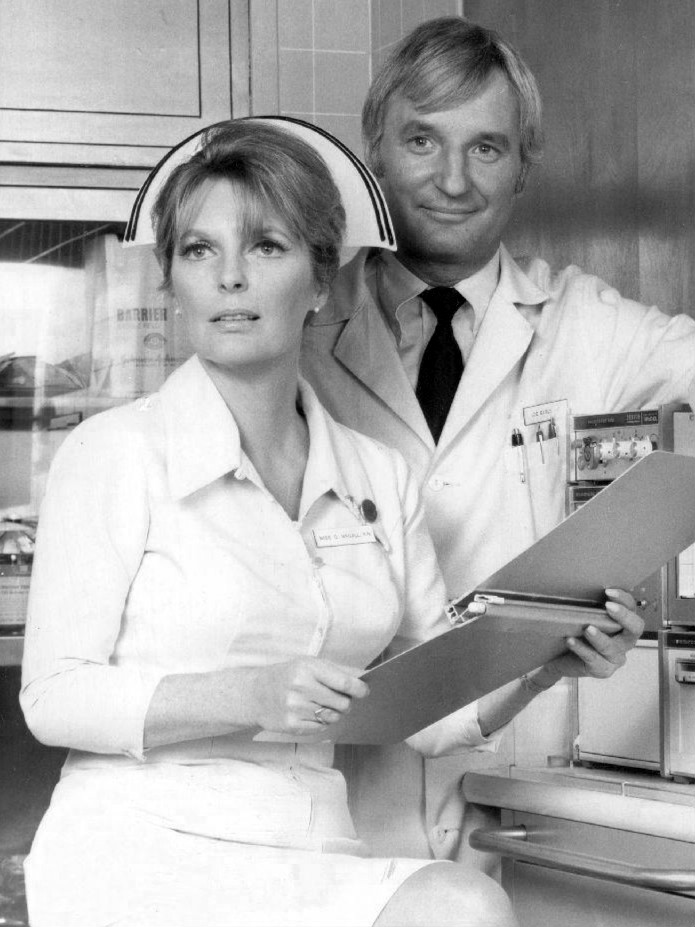
London and second husband Bobby Troup in character in season one of Emergency!

London remained close with ex-husband Jack Webb, and in 1972, he cast her and Troup in his television series Emergency!, of which he was executive producer. London played Dixie McCall, Rampart's Chief Nurse of The Emergency Room, and Troup was cast as emergency room physician Dr. Joe Early, along with her best friend Robert Fuller as Dr. Kelly Brackett, Rampart's Chief of Emergency Medicine. They all appeared in the same roles in an episode of the Webb-produced series Adam-12.

In 1977, after a six-year run of 128 episodes, Emergency! was cancelled despite good ratings. London, the only actress to appear in every episode of the series, was invited back for two of the four TV movie specials, and the show ended in 1979. During this time, London appeared in television advertisements for Rose Milk Skin Care Cream. Later, Webb offered London a position as executive producer of future television projects, but she chose to retire from the television industry to spend more time with her family. She completed "My Funny Valentine", her last musical recording, for the soundtrack of the Burt Reynolds film Sharky's Machine in 1981.

== Artistry ==
Predominantly a torch singer, London was described by critics as both "sultry" and "low-keyed". Her recordings were often noted by critics for being "intimate", typically featuring sparse guitar and bass arrangements. A BBC Legends episode noted: "Some singers sing as though they are addressing a crowd; some sing as though they are in a bar with a lot of people—[London] sings as though she's in one room, with you—and that's the difference."

Music journalist Lucy O'Brien stated: "[In] the mid-'50s...pop [was] in a period of transition from big band swing to small jazz combos; you've got rock'n'roll, you've got R&B—and she managed to incorporate all those influences and feed that into her music. She was very much of her time." As her career progressed into the 1960s, London's recordings incorporated more elaborate instrumentation, with her vocals backed by larger ensembles.

== Personal life ==
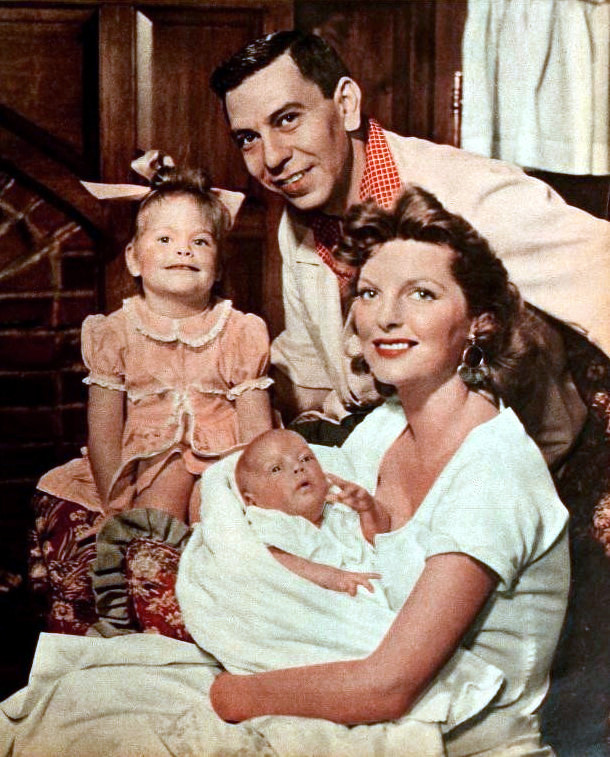
Julie and Jack Webb with Stacy and Lisa, 1953

In 1947, London married actor/producer Jack Webb. Their relationship was based partly on their common love of jazz. They had two daughters, Stacy and Lisa. London and Webb divorced in 1954. Julie married Bobby Troup in 1959. London had three children with Troup: Kelly and twins boys Jody and Reese Troup. Their daughter, Kelly, appeared in episodes of the TV series Emergency! as a child. Jack Webb died December 23, 1982. Stacy Webb died in a traffic accident in 1996, one day after her mother's 70th birthday.

Withdrawn and introverted despite her public persona, London rarely granted media interviews and never discussed the breakup of her marriage to Webb.

== Death ==
London was a chain smoker from the age of 16 and at times smoked in excess of three packs of cigarettes per day. She suffered a stroke in 1995 and remained in poor health for the following five years. In late 1999, she was diagnosed with lung cancer but decided to forgo treatment due to her weakened physical state. On October 17, 2000, London was rushed from her home to the Encino-Tarzana Regional Medical Center after choking and struggling to breathe. She died in the hospital in the early morning hours of October 18 of what was later determined to be cardiac arrest; she was 74.

London was cremated and buried next to Troup in the Courts of Remembrance Columbarium of Providence at Forest Lawn-Hollywood Hills Cemetery in Los Angeles. Her star on the Hollywood Walk of Fame (for recording) is at 7000 Hollywood Boulevard in Los Angeles.

== Legacy ==
London performed "Cry Me a River" in the film The Girl Can't Help It (1956), and her recording gained later attention for its use in the films Passion of Mind (2000) and V for Vendetta (2006). The track was ranked number 48 in NPR's list of the 50 Greatest Jazz Vocals and was inducted into the Grammy Hall of Fame in 2001.

Her albums Julie...At Home and Around Midnight (both released in 1960) were both included in the book 1,000 Recordings to Hear Before You Die. She has been named as an influence by several contemporary artists, including Lana Del Rey and Billie Eilish. Music journalist Will Friedwald referred to London as "one of the most influential stylists of the early 20th century." London also inspired a tribute from Jools Holland and Jamiroquai as part of their music video version of "I'm in the Mood for Love" shortly after she died.

Her cover of the Ohio Express song "Yummy Yummy Yummy" was featured on the television series Six Feet Under and appears on its soundtrack album. London's "Must Be Catchin' " was featured in the 2011 premiere episode of the series Pan Am.

== Sources ==
- Cason, Buzz (2004). Living the Rock 'n Roll Dream: The Adventures of Buzz Cason. Hal Leonard Corporation. ISBN 978-1-61780-116-7.
- Ellenberger, Allan R. (2001). Celebrities in Los Angeles Cemeteries: A Directory. McFarland. ISBN 978-0-786-40983-9.
- Friedwald, Will (2010). A Biographical Guide to the Great Jazz and Pop Singers. Pantheon Books. ISBN 978-0-375-42149-5.
- Hal Leonard Corp. (2007). The Great American Songbook - The Singers: Music and Lyrics for 100 Standards from the Golden Age of American Song. Hal Leonard. ISBN 978-1-4584-8195-5.
- Loy, R. Philip (2004). Westerns in a Changing America, 1955–2000. McFarland. ISBN 978-0-7864-8301-3.
- McKnight-Trontz, Jennifer (1999). Exotiquarium: Album Art from the Space Age. St. Martin's Press. ISBN 978-0-312-20133-3.
- Moon, Tom (2008). 1,000 Recordings to Hear Before You Die: A Listener's Life List. Workman Publishing. ISBN 978-0-761-13963-8.
- Murrells, Joseph (1978). The Book of Golden Discs (2nd ed.). London: Barrie and Jenkins Ltd. ISBN 0-214-20512-6.
- Owen, Michael (2017). Go Slow: The Life of Julie London. Chicago Reviews Press. ISBN 978-1-613-73859-7.
- Staggs, Sam (2003). Close-up on Sunset Boulevard: Billy Wilder, Norma Desmond, and the Dark Hollywood Dream. St. Martin's Press. ISBN 978-1-4668-3046-2.
- Summerfield, Maurice J. (2008). Barney Kessel, A Jazz Legend. Ashley Mark Publishing. ISBN 978-1-872639-69-7.
