= Charlie Haden discography =

This is the discography for American jazz musician Charlie Haden.

== As leader/co-leader ==
Recording date	Title	Co-leader / Personnel	Label	Year released	Notes
1976-01-26, 1976-03-18, -21	Closeness	Duets with Ornette Coleman, Keith Jarrett, Alice Coltrane and Paul Motian	Horizon	1976	
1976-01-25, 1976-08-21	As Long as There's Music	Duo with Hampton Hawes	Artists House	1978	
1976-06-07, 1976-08-21; 1976-12-19, -20	The Golden Number	Duets with Don Cherry, Archie Shepp, Hampton Hawes and Ornette Coleman	Horizon	1977	
1977-01-30	Soapsuds, Soapsuds	Duo with Ornette Coleman	Artists House	1977	
1978-09-22	Gitane	Duo with Christian Escoudé	All Life	1979	
1979-06	Mágico	Trio with Jan Garbarek and Egberto Gismonti	ECM	1980	
1979-12	Folk Songs	Trio with Jan Garbarek and Egberto Gismonti	ECM	1981	
1981-04	Mágico: Carta de Amor	Trio with Jan Garbarek and Egberto Gismonti	ECM	2012	Live
1981-07	Time Remembers One Time Once	Duo with Denny Zeitlin	ECM	1983	Live
1987-09-14, -15	Etudes	Co-led with Paul Motian featuring Geri Allen	Soul Note	1988	
1987-11-11, -12	Silence	with Chet Baker, Enrico Pieranunzi and Billy Higgins	Soul Note	1989	
1988-02-28	Live at the Jazz Record Mart	Solo Bass	Delmark	2025	
1988-11-21 – -25	Helium Tears	with Ralph Towner, Jerry Granelli and Robben Ford	NewEdition	2005	
1989-06-30	The Montreal Tapes: Tribute to Joe Henderson	with Joe Henderson and Al Foster	Verve	2003	Live
1989-07-01	The Montreal Tapes: with Geri Allen and Paul Motian	with Geri Allen and Paul Motian	Verve	1997	Live
1989-07-02	The Montreal Tapes: with Don Cherry and Ed Blackwell	with Don Cherry and Ed Blackwell	Verve	1994	Live
1989-07-03	The Montreal Tapes: with Gonzalo Rubalcaba and Paul Motian	with Gonzalo Rubalcaba and Paul Motian	Verve	1997	Live
1989-07-06	In Montreal	Duo with Egberto Gismonti	ECM	2001	Live
1989-07-07	The Montreal Tapes: with Paul Bley and Paul Motian	with Paul Bley and Paul Motian	Verve	1994	Live
1990-01-28, -29	Dialogues	Duo with Carlos Paredes	Antilles	1990	
1990-04-26	First Song	Trio with Enrico Pieranunzi and Billy Higgins	Soul Note	1992	
1990-07-02	Charlie Haden/Jim Hall	Duo with Jim Hall	Impulse!	2014	Live
1990-12-21, -22	Live At The Village Vanguard - Unissued Tracks	Trio with Geri Allen and Paul Motian	Somethin' Cool	2022	Live. Posthumous release.
1994-06-29, -30	Steal Away	Duo with Hank Jones	Verve	1995	
1996-04-15	Beyond the Missouri Sky (Short Stories)	Duo with Pat Metheny	Verve	1997	
1996-09-20 – -22	Night and the City	Duo with Kenny Barron	Verve	1998	Live
1997-07-05, -06	None But the Lonely Heart	Duo with Chris Anderson	Naim	1998	
2000-08-27 – -30	Nocturne	with Gonzalo Rubalcaba et al.	Verve	2001	
2002-05-14 – -17	American Dreams	with Michael Brecker featuring Brad Mehldau and Brian Blade	Verve	2002	
2003-10-08, -09	Nightfall	Duo with John Taylor	Naim	2004	
2003-12-19 – -22	Land of the Sun	with Gonzalo Rubalcaba et al.	Verve	2004	
2005-03-16 – -19	Tokyo Adagio	Duo with Gonzalo Rubalcaba	Impulse!	2015	Live. Posthumous release.
2006-06-26, -27, -28	Heartplay	Duo with Antonio Forcione	Naim	2006	At The Herb Alpert School of Music, California Institute of the Arts
2007-03	Jasmine	Duo with Keith Jarrett	ECM	2010	
2007-03	Last Dance	Duo with Keith Jarrett	ECM	2014	
2007-11-05	Long Ago and Far Away	Duo with Brad Mehldau	Impulse!	2018	Live. Posthumous release.
2008-01-05 – -12; 2008-04-12, -14, -26	Rambling Boy	with family and friends	EmArcy	2008	
2010-02-02, -03	Come Sunday	Duo with Hank Jones	EmArcy	2012	

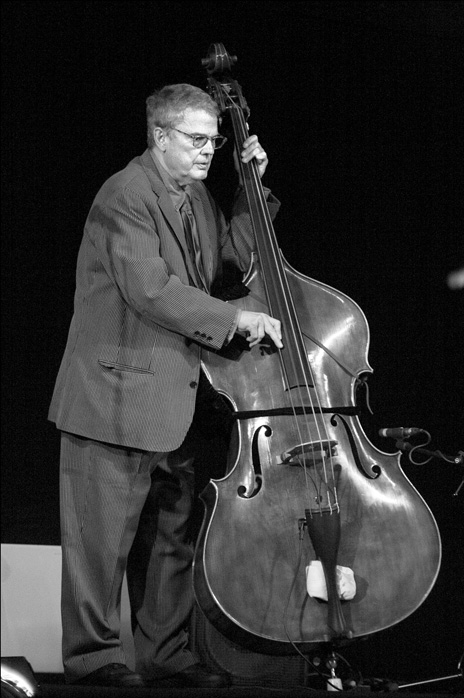
Haden in Ghent, Belgium, 2007

=== As leader of the Liberation Music Orchestra ===
Recording date	Title	Label	Year released	Notes
1969-04-27 – -29	Liberation Music Orchestra	Impulse!	1970	
1982-11	The Ballad of the Fallen	ECM	1983	Not credited as Liberation Music Orchestra
1989-07-08	The Montreal Tapes: Liberation Music Orchestra	Verve	1999	Live at the Montreal International Jazz Festival
1990-04-04, -05	Dream Keeper	DIW	1990	Grammy nominated
2004-07-19 – 22	Not in Our Name	Verve	2005	
2011-08-15, 2015-01-14, -15	Time/Life	Impulse!	2016	Partially live at the Jazz Middelheim festival in Antwerp. Posthumous release.

=== As leader of Quartet West ===
Recording date	Title	Label	Year released	Notes
1986-12-22, -23	Quartet West	Verve	1987	
1987-08-06, 1988-04-04	The Private Collection	Naim	2007 (Limited edition: 1994)	Live [2CD, 3LP]
1988-05-30, 1988-06-01	In Angel City	Verve	1988	
1991-10-27, -28	Haunted Heart	Verve	1992	Featuring the voices of Billie Holiday, Jo Stafford and Jeri Southern
1993-07-30, 1993-08-01	Always Say Goodbye	Verve	1994	
1995-07-18 – -20	Now Is the Hour	Verve	1996	
1999-02-19 – -22	The Art of the Song	Verve	1999	with vocals of Bill Henderson and Shirley Horn
2010-05-20, -21, 2010-06-04, 2010-07-12, -26	Sophisticated Ladies	EmAcy	2010	with vocals of Diana Krall, Melody Gardot, Norah Jones, Cassandra Wilson, Renée Fleming and Ruth Cameron

== As a member ==
Old and New Dreams

- Old and New Dreams (Black Saint, 1977)
- Old and New Dreams (ECM, 1979)
- Playing (ECM, 1981) – live rec. 1980
- A Tribute to Blackwell (Black Saint, 1990) – live rec. 1987

== As sideman ==
With Geri Allen and Paul Motian

- In the Year of the Dragon (JMT, 1989)
- Segments (DIW, 1989)
- Live at the Village Vanguard (DIW, 1991) – live rec. 1990

With Ginger Baker and Bill Frisell

- Going Back Home (Atlantic, 1994)
- Falling Off the Roof (Atlantic, 1996)

With Carla Bley

- Escalator over the Hill (JCOA, 1971)
- Musique Mecanique (Watt, 1979)

With Paul Bley

- Solemn Meditation (GNP Crescendo, 1958)
- Live at the Hilcrest Club 1958 (Inner City, 1976)
- Coleman Classics Volume 1 (Improvising Artists, 1977)
- Memoirs (Soul Note, 1990)

With Michael Brecker

- Michael Brecker (Impulse!, 1987)
- Don't Try This at Home (Impulse!, 1988)
- Nearness of You: The Ballad Book (Verve, 2001) – rec. 2000

With Ruth Cameron

- First Songs (Polygram, 1999)
- Roadhouse (Verve, 2000)

With Don Cherry

- Relativity Suite (JCOA, 1973)
- Brown Rice (EMI, 1975)
- Art Deco (A&M, 1989) – rec. 1988

With Ornette Coleman

- The Shape of Jazz to Come (Atlantic, 1959)
- Change of the Century (Atlantic, 1959)
- This Is Our Music (Atlantic, 1960)
- Free Jazz: A Collective Improvisation (Atlantic, 1961)
- The Empty Foxhole (Blue Note, 1966)
- Ornette at 12 (Impulse!, 1969)
- Crisis (Impulse!, 1969)
- Friends and Neighbors: Live at Prince Street (Flying Dutchman, 1970)
- The Art of the Improvisers (Atlantic, 1970) – rec. 1959–1960
- Science Fiction (Columbia, 1971)
- Broken Shadows (Columbia, 1971)
- To Whom Who Keeps a Record (Atlantic, 1975) – rec. 1959–1960
- In All Languages (Caravan of Dreams Productions, 1987)
- The Belgrade Concert (Jazz Door, 1995) – rec. 1971
- The Complete Science Fiction Sessions (Columbia, 2000) – rec. 1971–1972
- The Love Revolution (Gambit, 2005) – rec. 1968; music previously issued on Live In Milano 1968 and The Unprecedented Music of Ornette Coleman
- Live in Paris 1971 (Jazz Row, 2007) – rec. 1971

With Alice Coltrane

- Journey in Satchidananda (Impulse!, 1971) – 1 track "Isis and Osiris"
- John Coltrane: Infinity (Impulse!, 1972)
- Lord of Lords (Impulse!, 1972)
- Eternity (Warner, 1975)
- Translinear Light (Impulse!, 2004)
- Live at the Berkeley Community Theater 1972 (BCT, 2019) – rec. 1972

With Joe Henderson

- The Elements (Milestone, 1974) – rec. 1973
- An Evening with Joe Henderson (Red, 1987) – live

With Keith Jarrett

- Life Between the Exit Signs (Vortex, 1968)
- Somewhere Before (Atlantic, 1968)
- The Mourning of a Star (Atlantic, 1971)
- Birth (Atlantic, 1972)
- Expectations (Columbia, 1972)
- Fort Yawuh (Impulse!, 1973)
- Treasure Island (Impulse!, 1974)
- El Juicio (The Judgement) (Atlantic, 1975)
- Death and the Flower (Impulse!, 1975)
- Backhand (Impulse!, 1975)
- Arbour Zena (ECM, 1976)
- Mysteries (Impulse!, 1976)
- Shades (Impulse!, 1976)
- The Survivors' Suite (ECM, 1977)
- Byablue (Impulse!, 1977)
- Bop-Be (Impulse!, 1978)
- Eyes of the Heart (ECM, 1979)
- Hamburg '72 (ECM, 2014)

With Lee Konitz and Brad Mehldau

- Alone Together (Blue Note, 1996)
- Another Shade of Blue (Blue Note, 1997)
- Live at Birdland with Paul Motian (ECM, 2009)

With Abbey Lincoln

- The World Is Falling Down (Verve, 1990)
- You Gotta Pay the Band (Verve, 1991)
- A Turtle's Dream (Verve, 1994)

With Pat Metheny

- 80/81 (ECM, 1980)
- Rejoicing (ECM, 1984)
- Song X with Ornette Coleman (Geffen, 1986)
- Secret Story (Geffen, 1992)

With Paul Motian

- Conception Vessel (ECM, 1972)
- Tribute (ECM, 1974)
- On Broadway Volume 1 (JMT, 1988)
- On Broadway Volume 2 (JMT, 1989)
- On Broadway Volume 3 (JMT, 1991)

With Art Pepper

- Living Legend (Contemporary, 1975)
- So in Love (Artists House, 1979)
- Artworks (Galaxy, 1984) – rec. 1979
- Art 'n' Zoot with Zoot Sims (Pablo, 1995) – rec. 1981

With Enrico Pieranunzi

- Fellini Jazz (CAM Jazz, 2003)
- Special Encounter (CAM Jazz, 2005) – rec. 2003

With Gonzalo Rubalcaba

- Discovery – Live at Montreux (Blue Note, 1990)
- The Blessing (Blue Note, 1991)
- Suite 4 Y 20 (Blue Note, 1992)
- Imagine (Blue Note, 1994)

With Roswell Rudd

- Everywhere (Impulse!, 1966)
- Numatik Swing Band (JCOA, 1973)

With John Scofield

- Time on My Hands (Blue Note, 1990) – rec. 1989
- Grace Under Pressure (Blue Note, 1992) – rec. 1991

With Ringo Starr

- Ringo Rama (Koch, 2003) – rec. 2002
- Ringo 2012 (UMe, 2012)

With Denny Zeitlin

- Carnival (Columbia, 1964)
- Live at the Trident (Columbia, 1965)
- Zeitgeist (Columbia, 1967)
- Tidal Wave (Quicksilver, 1983)
- Time Remembers One Time Once (ECM, 1983)

With others

- Ray Anderson, Every One of Us (Gramavision, 1992)
- Gato Barbieri, The Third World (Flying Dutchman, 1970) – rec. 1969
- Kenny Barron, Wanton Spirit with Roy Haynes (Verve, 1994)
- Beck, Odelay (DGC, 1996)
- Jane Ira Bloom, Mighty Lights (Enja, 1982)
- Dušan Bogdanović, Early to Rise (Palo Alto, 1983)
- Charles Brackeen, Rhythm X (Strata-East, 1973)
- Gavin Bryars, Farewell to Philosophy (Point, 1995)
- Henry Butler, Fivin' Around (Impulse!, 1986)
- John Coltrane, The Avant-Garde with Don Cherry (Atlantic, 1960)
- James Cotton, Deep in the Blues (Verve, 1995)
- Robert Downey Jr., The Futurist (Sony, 2004)
- Dizzy Gillespie, Rhythmstick (CTI, 1990)
- Jim Hall, Jim Hall & Basses (Telarc, 2001)
- Tom Harrell, Form (Contemporary, 1990)
- Fred Hersch, Sarabande (Sunnyside, 1986)
- Laurence Hobgood, When the Heart Dances (Naim Jazz, 2008)
- Bruce Hornsby, A Night on the Town (RCA, 1990)
- Mark Isham, Songs My Children Taught Me (Windham Hill, 1991)
- Rickie Lee Jones, Pop Pop (Geffen, 1991)
- David Liebman, Sweet Hands (Horizon, 1975)
- Joe Lovano, Universal Language (Blue Note, 1992)
- Michael Mantler, The Jazz Composer's Orchestra (JCOA, 1968)
- Adam Makowicz, Naughty Baby (RCA Novus, 1987)
- Harvey Mason, With All My Heart (RCA, 2004)
- John McLaughlin, My Goal's Beyond (Douglas, 1970)
- Mike Melvoin, The Capitol Sessions (Naim, 2000)
- Helen Merrill, You and the Night and the Music (Verve, 1998)
- Mingus Dynasty, Chair in the Sky (Elektra, 1980)
- Grachan Moncur III & Jazz Composer's Orchestra, Echoes of Prayer (JCOA, 1975)
- Bheki Mseleku, Star Seeding (Polygram, 1995)
- Joe Pass, 12-string Guitar Movie Themes (World Pacific, 1964)
- Dewey Redman, Soundsigns (Galaxy, 1978)
- Joshua Redman, Wish (Warner, 1993)
- Pee Wee Russell and Henry "Red" Allen, The College Concert (Impulse!, 1966)
- Dino Saluzzi, Once Upon a Time – Far Away in the South (ECM, 1986) – rec. 1985
- David Sanborn, Another Hand (Elektra, 1991)
- Archie Shepp, Mama Too Tight (Impulse!, 1967) – rec. 1966
- Alan Shorter, Orgasm (Verve, 1969) – rec. 1968
- Nana Simopoulos, Wings and Air (Enja, 1986)
- Wadada Leo Smith, Divine Love (ECM, 1979) – rec. 1978
- Masahiko Togashi, Session in Paris (Take One, 1979)
- Akiko Yano, Welcome Back (Midi, 1989)
