= Solo (Gonzalo Rubalcaba album) =

Studio album by Gonzalo Rubalcaba
- Released: March 7, 2006
- Genre: Cuban jazz
- Length: 55:04
- Label: Blue Note
- Producer: Gonzalo Rubalcaba

Gonzalo Rubalcaba chronology
Paseo (2004)	Solo (2006)	Avatar (2008)

Solo is a studio album by Cuban jazz performer Gonzalo Rubalcaba. It was released by Blue Note Records on March 7, 2006, and peaked at number 22 in the Billboard Top Jazz Albums chart. The album is titled Solo since no additional performers were included on the recording as in Rubalcaba's previous albums.

Also produced by Rubalcaba, Solo was released following his second collaborative work with Charlie Haden on the album Land of the Sun, which resulted in a Grammy Award for Haden. The album includes fifteen tracks and met with mostly positive reviews by critics, most commenting on the ability of the performer and the simplicity of the arrangements. The album was nominated for a Billboard Latin Music Award, and won the Latin Grammy for Best Latin Jazz Album.

== Background and release ==
Cuban pianist Gonzalo Rubalcaba recorded Solo following his collaboration with Charlie Haden on Land of the Sun, an album featuring songs written by Mexican composer José Sabre Marroquin and arranged by Rubalcaba, a sequel to Nocturne (2001), another collaboration between them. Haden and Rubalcaba were awarded the Grammy Award for Best Latin Jazz Album for both albums. Solo was the first solo album (not featuring guest musicians) released by the performer in twenty years. Rubalcaba described this album as an "aural diary, an album of secrets, letters and notes, and photos." The album was released by Blue Note Records on March 7, 2006.

== Content ==
Solo includes fifteen tracks, some previously released. Recording sessions took place from November 8 to 10, 2005, at The Hit Factory and Criteria Studios in Miami, Florida. There are four improvised tracks inspired by John Coltrane's Giant Steps: "Paseo Iluminado", "Paseo en Media Luz", "Paseo Azul", and "Paseo Morado". "Iluminado (Improv #1)", according to Roberto R. Calder of PopMatters, has "stock phrasing, but a pause in concentration before the sublime quality of a one-minute lullaby worth waiting for"; "Media Luz (Improv #2)" "hints at jazz with concert-room sonorities and a striking ending"; "Azul (Improv #3)" "proceeds with more consistent direction than its two predecessors" and becomes a hymn"; and "Morado (Improv #4)" "develops into long linear passages for each hand." "Faro" is a track with "a simple ostinato bass, a transition section and a loud climax." The opening track, "Rezo", is an interlude inspired by the work of French composer Claude Debussy and American performer Duke Ellington, and is "based on Afro-Cuban melodies sung during Santería rites." "Silencio" is a tribute to Cuban boleros. "Prologo (Prologue to a Fantasy)" features a "congenial intellectual playfulness alternating between something like Spanish piano music of a century ago, and the dance-hall." "Bésame Mucho" was first included on the 1991 album The Blessing, Rubalcaba's first recording to be issued in the United States, and the version was named by Scott Yanow of AllMusic a "highlight" of the album, including accompaniment from Haden on bass guitar and drummer Jack DeJohnette. A reworked version is included on Solo, and is described as having an "intensely meditative character and slow deliberation," and "a more complex higher level of communication" than the original version. "Here's That Rainy Day" is a jazz ballad, recorded earlier for the album Inner Voyage, with an arrangement described as "breathtaking" by Ken Dryden of Allmusic. The first version of "Quasar" can be found on Paseo (2004); and the version included on Solo is described as "seven minutes of drama," by Calder of PopMatters, with "a sprawling, improv-heavy composition that runs Rubalcaba up and down the keyboard."

== Reception ==
Professional ratings
Review scores
Source	Rating
All About Jazz	(mixed)
AllMusic	3.5/5 stars
Jazz Houston	(positive)
JazzTimes	(positive)
Jazz Review	3/5 stars
Pop Matters	(8/10)
The Penguin Guide to Jazz Recordings	3/4 stars

Solo received mostly positive reviews from critics. Andrew Liengard of Jazz Houston stated that Rubalcaba played "at once a pyrotechnical and thunderous two-handed assault, he also demonstrates a profound awareness of space and dynamics," and finally called the album "stunning". Joey Guerra of Amazon said that Solo "finds Rubalcaba soaring on the strength of his own talent", creating a "unique experience." Website AllMusic stated that the album is a spellbinding collection of improvisations with "remarkable stylistic display." Harvey Siders of JazzTimes commented that the album did not need elaborate arrangements, being a "spontaneous inner dialogue from a brilliant inquisitive mind" and that on Solo "elegance trumps excitement." PopMatters' Robert R. Calder stated that the record was "a very remarkable solo piano recital." David Miller of All About Jazz gave the album a mixed review, being critical of the entertainment value, stating that the performer "is more introspective than ever, frequently using silence as his means of expression. The only problem is, it doesn't necessarily work." Miller also suggested that "Rubalcaba should develop his ideas in more conventional settings. He still has time to become a great solo artist, and this writer has every confidence that he will." In a separate review, Jim Santella, also of All About Jazz, praised Solo, commenting that Rubalcaba "finds space in his exploratory interpretation for dreamy soliloquies, but the excitement is all there, and it's powerful. The pianist makes us wait for this moment, and it's always worth the anticipation. Ultimately he lights an inspiring fire." Mark Corroto, in a third review of the album by All About Jazz, compared Rubalcaba's work to fellow Cuban artist Bebo Valdés, asseverating that both performers "blurred the lines between jazz, classical and folk, easily convincing you there need be no distinction." Timothy Sprinkle of Jazz Review declared that the performer "carries the disc with a light, breezy ease that's surprising, especially given all of the slow selections."

Solo peaked at number 22 in the Billboard Top Jazz Albums chart and was nominated for "Latin Jazz Album of the Year" at the 18th Annual Billboard Latin Music Awards, losing to Around the City by Eliane Elias. Rubalcaba earned the Latin Grammy Award for Best Latin Jazz Album at the 7th Latin Grammy Awards for Solo.

== Track listing ==
The track listing is from AllMusic. All tracks written and composed by Gonzalo Rubalcaba, except "Nightfall" by Charlie Haden; "Bésame Mucho" by Consuelo Velázquez; and "Here's That Rainy Day" by Johnny Burke and James Van Heusen.

No.	Title	Length
1.	"Rezo"	1:37
2.	"Quasar"	6:48
3.	"Silencio"	3:40
4.	"Paseo Iluminado (Improv #1)"	3:26
5.	"Canción para Dormir en el Sillón"	1:05
6.	"Paseo en Media Luz (Improv #2)"	2:57
7.	"Canción de Cuna del Niño Negro"	2:44
8.	"Faro"	3:38
9.	"Paseo Azul (Improv #3)"	2:42
10.	"Sueño de Muñecas"	1:36
11.	"Paseo Morado (Improv #4)"	2:27
12.	"Prologo (Prologue to a Fantasy)"	7:05
13.	"Here's That Rainy Day"	5:37
14.	"Nightfall"	5:12
15.	"Bésame Mucho"	4:13
Total length:		55:04

== Personnel ==
This information is adapted from AllMusic.

- Gonzalo Rubalcaba – main performer, producer, composer, piano
- Charlie Haden – composer
- Jim Anderson – audio engineer, mixing
- Ken Blaydow – executive producer
- Mario Garcia – post-digital production
- Perry Greenfield – product manager
- Brian Montgomery – mixing assistant
- Neweraj Khajanchi – assistant engineer
- Allan Tucker – mastering
- Gordon H. Jee – creative director
- Eli Wolf – A&R
- Jana Leon – photography
- Tor Lundvall – paintings
- Burton Yount – art direction, graphic design
