= Supernova (Gonzalo Rubalcaba Trio album) =

Studio album by Gonzalo Rubalcaba Trio
- Released: July 17, 2001
- Recorded: 53:36
- Genre: Cuban jazz
- Label: Blue Note
- Producer: Gonzalo Rubalcaba

Gonzalo Rubalcaba chronology
Inner Voyage (1999)	Supernova (2001)	Straight Ahead (2003)

Supernova is a studio album by The Gonzalo Rubalcaba Trio released by Blue Note Records on July 17, 2001. The trio consisted of Gonzalo Rubalcaba on piano, bassist Carlos Henríquez, and drummer Ignacio Berroa. It peaked at number 25 in the Billboard Top Jazz Albums chart.

Produced by Rubalcaba, the album was released following his collaborative work with Charlie Haden on the album Nocturne, which resulted in a Grammy Award for Haden. Supernova includes nine tracks and met with mostly positive reviews by critics, most commenting on the versatility and musical ability of the performer. The album was further nominated for a Grammy, a Billboard Latin Music Award, and earned the Latin Grammy for Best Latin Jazz Album.

== Background and release ==
Cuban pianist Gonzalo Rubalcaba recorded Supernova following his collaboration with Charlie Haden on the album Nocturne, which was co-produced, performed and orchestrated by Rubalcaba. The pianist was named the "most visible musical presence" in Nocturne and the album received the Grammy Award for Best Latin Jazz Album at the 44th Grammy Awards, after being referred to as an "engaging blend of jazz and Latin song" by Don Heckman of Los Angeles Times. About Supernova, Rubalcaba stated that blends the melodic tone of his previous album (Inner Voyage) and the lyricism of his early records.

In May 2001, three months before the album release, Rubalcaba along with bassist Carlos Henriquez and drummer Ignacio Berroa (The Gonzalo Rubalcaba Trio), debuted some of the tracks at the Catalina Jazz Club in Los Angeles, California, without telling his audience beforehand. Heckman described the songs as "pieces roved through unusual metric territory, with explosive accents bursting out of the rhythmic flow." The album was released by Blue Note Records on July 17, 2001, becoming Rubalcaba's seventh album for the label.

== Content ==
The album includes nine tracks, five original songs and four covers. The title track is separated in two takes, "Supernova 1" and "Supernova 2". The first one shifts constantly the time signature becoming a "stop-and-start" mambo. Matt Cibula of PopMatters highlights the work of Berroa on the drums and Henriquez' bass, giving both pieces a "solid foundation". The second track, "El Cadete Constitucional", was written by Jacobo Rubalcaba (the pianist grandfather), as a children's song and adapted into a funky strut in its step, opening as a "throwback to early Cuban jazz", and ending with a very "modern" synthesizer solo. The song features additional percussion by Robert and Luis Quintero. "El Manicero", an American standard since 1930, also has and additional participation by the Quintero brothers. "Alma Mia" is a ballad, considered a Mexican standard on which the trio applies "honest melancholy lyricism." "The Hard One" is a re-recording of the original take included on Rubalcaba's Inner Voyage (1999). The track samples "Take Five" by Dave Brubeck, and features Rubalcaba's piano rumbling in "metrical unpredictability." "La Voz del Centro" is a waltz. The last song, "Oren", it is an "environmental piece" with drums and piano, deemed as "pretty but trivial".

== Reception and accolades ==
Professional ratings
Review scores
Source	Rating
All About Jazz	(positive)
AllMusic	4.5/5 stars
Billboard	(positive)
Entertainment Weekly	(B+)
Jazz Review	5/5 stars
Metro Times	(positive)
PopMatters	(mixed)
The Penguin Guide to Jazz Recordings	3.5/4 stars

Supernova received positive reviews from critics. Bret Love of AllMusic gave the album 4.5 stars out of five, calling it "a wonderful album of varying moods and textures." Leila Cobo of Billboard magazine named the album an "accomplished work that highlights a more introspective and versatile Rubalcaba." On the album review, Cobo also commented that "this [Supernova] is a refreshing outing." All About Jazz' Mark Corroto stated that the album proves that the performer "has plenty of heart rooted in a traditional Cuban music past and a head pointed into a diverse North American future." Matt Cibula of PopMatters stated that Supernova is a "wonderful record, that proves that Rubalcaba is one of the greatest composers and pianist in the world," but was critical about the lack of emotional commitment to his music, concluding that the album would work better on an audience that never heard the performer before. Entertainment Weekly gave the album a B+ grade, arguing that it "neatly showcases Rubalcaba's strengths: unerring yet playful rhythm, technical ferocity when required, burnished balladry, and Cuban swagger blended with jazz suavity." George Tysh of Metro Times stated that Supernova "incorporates both Rubalcaba personalities, being more percussively rhythmic (definitely more Latin) than Inner Voyage, but still as sensitive." Scottish Jazz Review magazine granted the album a perfect score of five stars, with Don Williamson stating that the album "continues to prove that Rubalcaba is dedicated to the authenticity, the tradition and the spirit of the Cuban music he studied and which is part of his being." The Rubalcaba's biography included on the book Jazz for Dummies (2006) by Dick Sutro, emphasizes that the album founds the performer on his peak form.

Rubalcaba received a nomination for a Grammy Award for Best Latin Jazz Album in 2002 for Supernova, which was awarded to Haden's Nocturne. Both albums were nominated the following year to the Latin Grammy Award in the same field. According to musician David Sánchez, the award was Rubalcaba's to lose since Haden was not Latino. Supernova earned the Latin Grammy. The track "Oren" was nominated for a Grammy Award for Best Instrumental Composition, which it lost to Alan Silvestri's "Cast Away (End Credits)". Supernova reached number two at the CMJ Jazz Albums chart and peaked at number 25 in the Billboard Top Jazz Albums chart and was nominated for "Latin Jazz Album of the Year" at the 13th Annual Billboard Latin Music Awards, losing to Latin Spirits by Poncho Sanchez.

== Track listing ==
The track listing from AllMusic. All tracks written and composed by Gonzalo Rubalcaba, except "El Cadete Constitucional" by Jacobo Rubalcaba, "El Manicero" by Moisés Simons and "Alma Mía" by María Grever.

No.	Title	Length
1.	"Supernova 1"	6:26
2.	"El Cadete Constitucional"	7:12
3.	"Alma Mía"	6:02
4.	"La Voz del Centro"	6:43
5.	"El Manicero"	8:30
6.	"Supernova 2"	6:11
7.	"Otra Mirada"	5:43
8.	"The Hard One"	7:05
9.	"Oren"	4:44

== Personnel ==
Information adapted from AllMusic:

- Gonzalo Rubalcaba – main performer, record producer
- Ignacio Berroa – drums, rainmaker
- Carlos Henríquez – bass
- Luis Quintero – güiro, timbales
- Robert Quintero – congas
- Jim Anderson – engineer, mixing engineer, rainmaker
- María Mendez Grever – composer
- Moisés Simóns – composer
- Juan Carlos Quesada;- executive producer
- Mantis Evar – production coordination
- Greenberg Kingsley – art direction, design
- Allan Tucker – editing
- Mario Garcia Haya – engineer
- Gordon H. Jee – creative director
- Jana Leon – photography
- Howard Mandel – liner notes
