= Loren Stillman =

American jazz musician

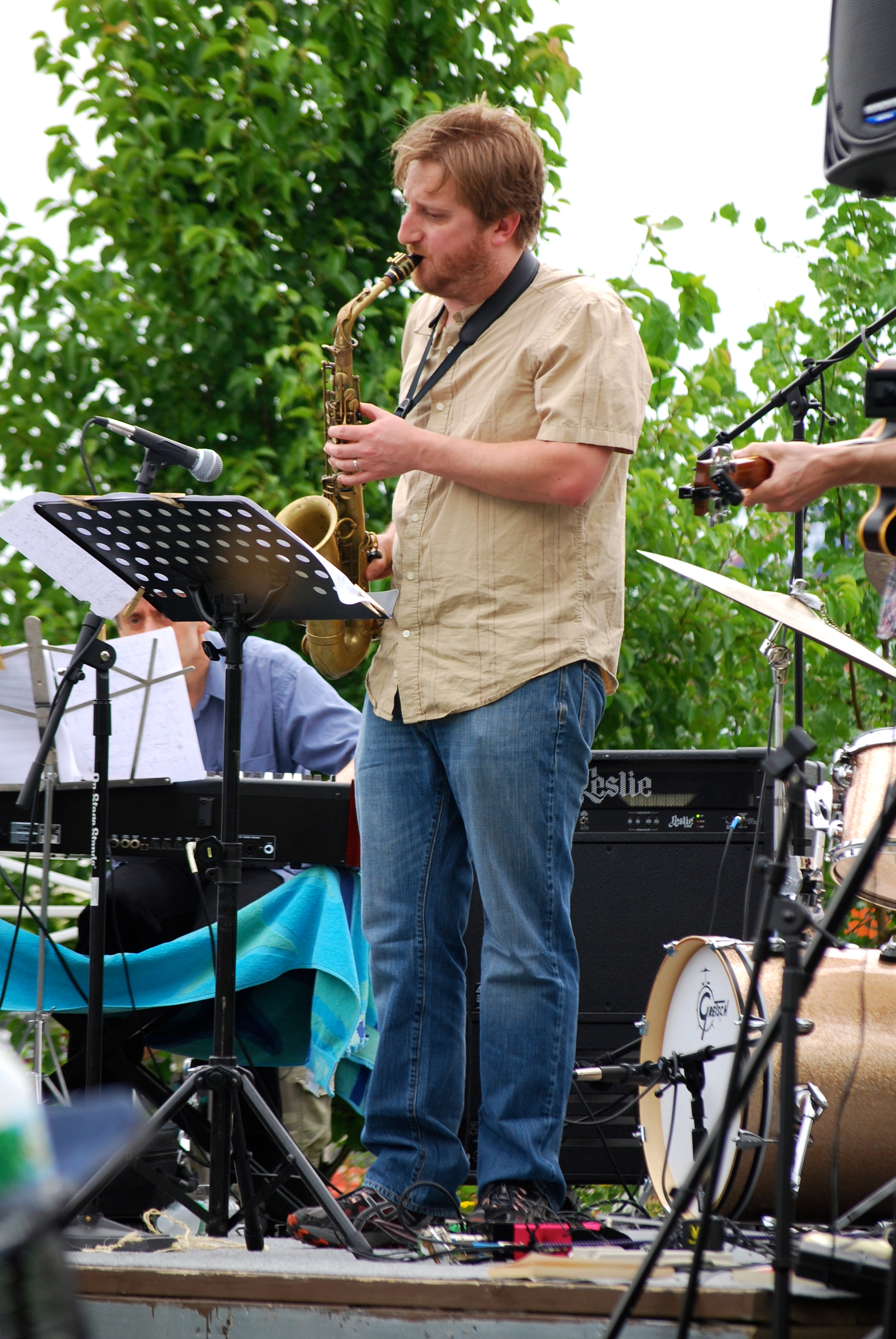
Stillman at the Red Hook Jazz Festival in 2013

Loren Stillman (born June 14, 1980) is a jazz saxophonist and composer. He has received two Outstanding Performance Awards (1996 and 1998) and the Rising Star Jazz Artist Award (2004) from Down Beat Magazine. and received the CMA/ASCAP Award for Adventurous Programming and the ASCAP Young Jazz Composers Award in 2005.

== Biography ==
Stillman was born in 1980 in London, England, and raised in Croton-on-Hudson, New York. He received scholarships to attend the Manhattan School of Music in 1998 and the New School University in 2002.

He received two Outstanding Performance Awards in 1996 and 1998 and the Rising Star Jazz Artist Award in 2004 from Down Beat Magazine. He was a semifinalist in the 2002 Thelonious Monk Saxophone Competition and in 2005 he received the CMA/ASCAP Award for Adventurous Programming and the ASCAP Young Jazz Composers Award.

He is hailed as "a writer and a stylist that has found a previously unoccupied slot in the jazz spectrum." (Jazz Review UK) Stillman has been recognized as one of today's truly original creative voices by The New York Times, Downbeat Magazine, JazzMan, Jazziz, JazzThing, Jazz-Times and National Public Radio. A former student of Lee Konitz and David Liebman, he has performed and recorded throughout the United States, Europe and Japan with his own ensembles, and with those led by Charlie Haden, Carla Bley, Paul Motian, John Abercrombie, Andy Milne’s Dapp Theory, Michele Rosewoman, Joe Lovano, Eivind Opsvik, Tyshawn Sorey, Samo Salamon, Vic Juris and The Village Vanguard Jazz Orchestra.

It Could Be Anything (2005, Fresh Sound) and The Brothers’ Breakfast (2006, Steeplechase) received critical acclaim from The New York Times, and four star awards from BBC Jazz Review and Downbeat Magazine. Stillman has been a featured artist on WKCR, Weekend America and LIU Radio programming.

== Discography ==
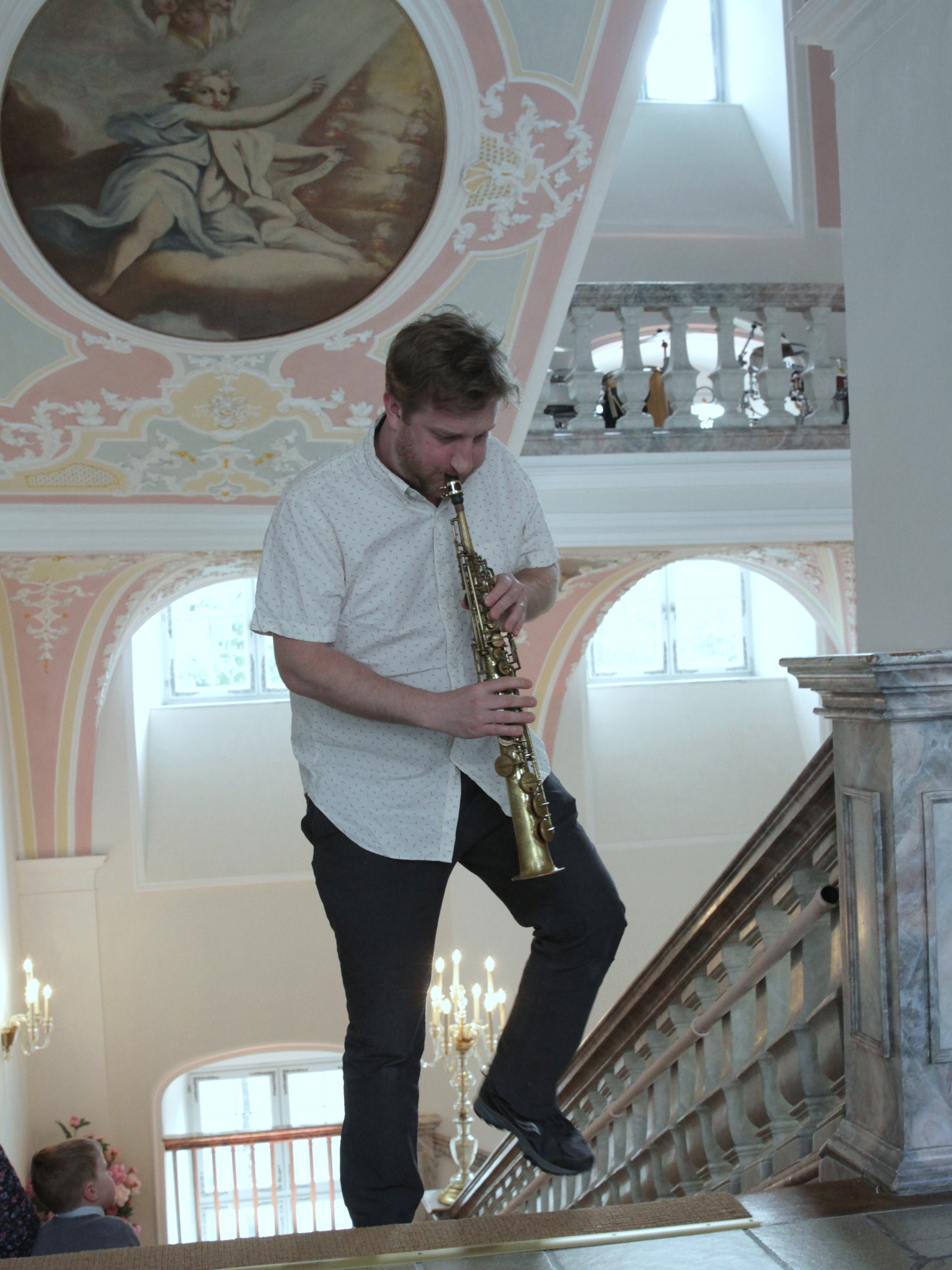
Loren Stillman at Tonspuren Irsee 2014, Germany

=== As leader ===
- Cosmos (1997). Loren Stillman Quartet. Soul Note Records. OCLC: 41124309
- Gin Bon (2003). The Loren Stillman Quartet with John Abercrombie. Fresh Sounds Records. OCLC: 53381154
- How Sweet It Is (2003). Loren Stillman Quartet. Nagel-Heyer Records. OCLC: 56605789
- It Could Be Anything (2005). Loren Stillman. Fresh Sound Records. OCLC: 63165502
- Jam Session Vol. 15 (2005). Loren Stillman. Steeplechase Records. OCLC: 150290822
- The Brother's Breakfast (2006). Loren Stillman. Steeplechase Records. OCLC: 156528260
- Trio Alto Volume One (2006). Loren Stillman. Steeplechase Records.OCLC: 145151902
- Trio Alto Volume Two (2007). Loren Stillman. Steeplechase Records. OCLC: 156859282
- Blind Date (2007). Loren Stillman. Pirouet Records. OCLC: 172985775
- Winter Fruits (2009). Loren Stillman. Pirouet Records. OCLC: 502281234

=== As sideman ===
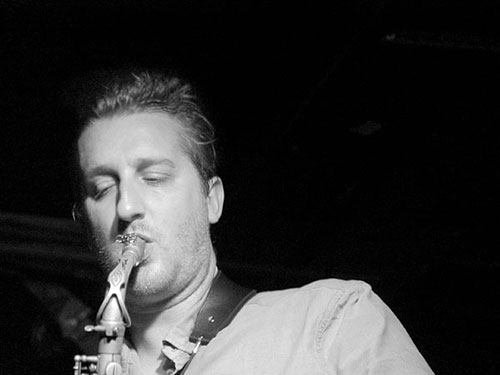
Loren Stillman

With Charlie Haden Liberation Music Orchestra

- Time/Life (Impulse!, 2011-2015 [2016])

With Paul Motian

- On Broadway Volume 5 (Winter & Winter, 2009)

With Chris Dingman

- Waking Dreams, 2011

With Samo Salamon

- 2 Alto, (Steeplechase Records, 2014)
