= Time/Life =

Studio album /Live album by Charlie Haden Liberation Music Orchestra
- Released: October 14, 2016
- Recorded: August 15, 2011 and January 14–15, 2015
- Studios: Jazz Middelheim, Antwerp, Belgium; Power Station (recording studio), New York City
- Genre: Jazz
- Length: 47:16
- Labels: Impulse! 479 848-0
- Producers: Carla Bley and Ruth Cameron

Charlie Haden chronology
| Tokyo Adagio (2015) | Time/Life (2016) | Long Ago and Far Away (2018) |

Liberation Music Orchestra chronology
| Not in Our Name (2005) | Time/Life (2016) |

Time/Life (subtitled (Song for the Whales and Other Beings)) is an album by Charlie Haden's Liberation Music Orchestra arranged by composer and pianist Carla Bley and released on the Impulse! label in 2016. It features two tracks from Haden's final live performance with the Orchestra along with additional studio recordings completed after his death.

== Reception ==
Professional ratings
Review scores
| Source | Rating |
|---|---|
| AllMusic | 4.5/5 stars |
| The Guardian | 4/5 stars |
| The Irish Times | 4/5 stars |
| The Observer | 4/5 stars |
| Vice (Expert Witness) | (3-star Honorable Mention) |

AllMusic said that the album was "an atmospheric, elegiac album inspired by Haden's longstanding love and concern for the environment" and noted "What is also particularly compelling about Time/Life is how well the live recordings blend with the studio tracks. Much of this is due to Bley, whose arranging and spare, harmonic piano skills bridge the recordings and help elevate the album to one of the best in the LMO's catalog". They also selected it as one of their Favorite Jazz Albums of 2016. Writing in The Guardian, John Fordham observed "These five pieces (with Haden playing on two, and his bass deputy Steve Swallow on the others) include the classic Miles Davis/Bill Evans ballad "Blue in Green" – featuring a typically spare and throbbing Haden solo and gorgeous tenor sax playing from Tony Malaby and Chris Cheek – and Carla Bley’s slow-burn throwback to earlier Liberation Music days in the march-time snare-drum beat of the title track".

The Observer's Dave Gelly said "the orchestra’s unrestrained sound suggests the luxuriance of nature. The first solo of the whole set is taken by Haden himself, his dark, woody tone quite unmistakable. It may have been his last". Cormac Larkin of The Irish Times said "It opens and closes with live recordings – among the last made before Haden’s death in 2014 – including a luminous version of Miles Davis’s Blue in Green. The rest of this powerful, emotionally charged album was recorded by his grieving fellow musicians the day after Haden’s memorial service in New York, and is a fitting farewell to a great and courageous musician".

== Track listing ==
All compositions by Carla Bley except where noted.

1. "Blue in Green" (Miles Davis, Live) – 8:16
2. "Time/Life" – 14:19
3. "Silent Spring" – 11:43
4. "Útviklingssang" – 7:55
5. "Song for the Whales" (Charlie Haden, Live) – 11:43

== Personnel ==
- Charlie Haden (tracks 1 & 5), Steve Swallow (tracks 2–4) – bass
- Carla Bley – piano, arranger, conductor
- Seneca Black, Michael Rodriguez – trumpet & flugelhorn
- Vincent Chancey – French horn
- Curtis Fowlkes – trombone
- Joseph Daley – tuba
- Loren Stillman – alto saxophone
- Chris Cheek, Tony Malaby – tenor saxophone
- Steve Cardenas – guitar
- Matt Wilson – drums
