= Ernesto Simpson =

Cuban jazz drummer (born 1964)

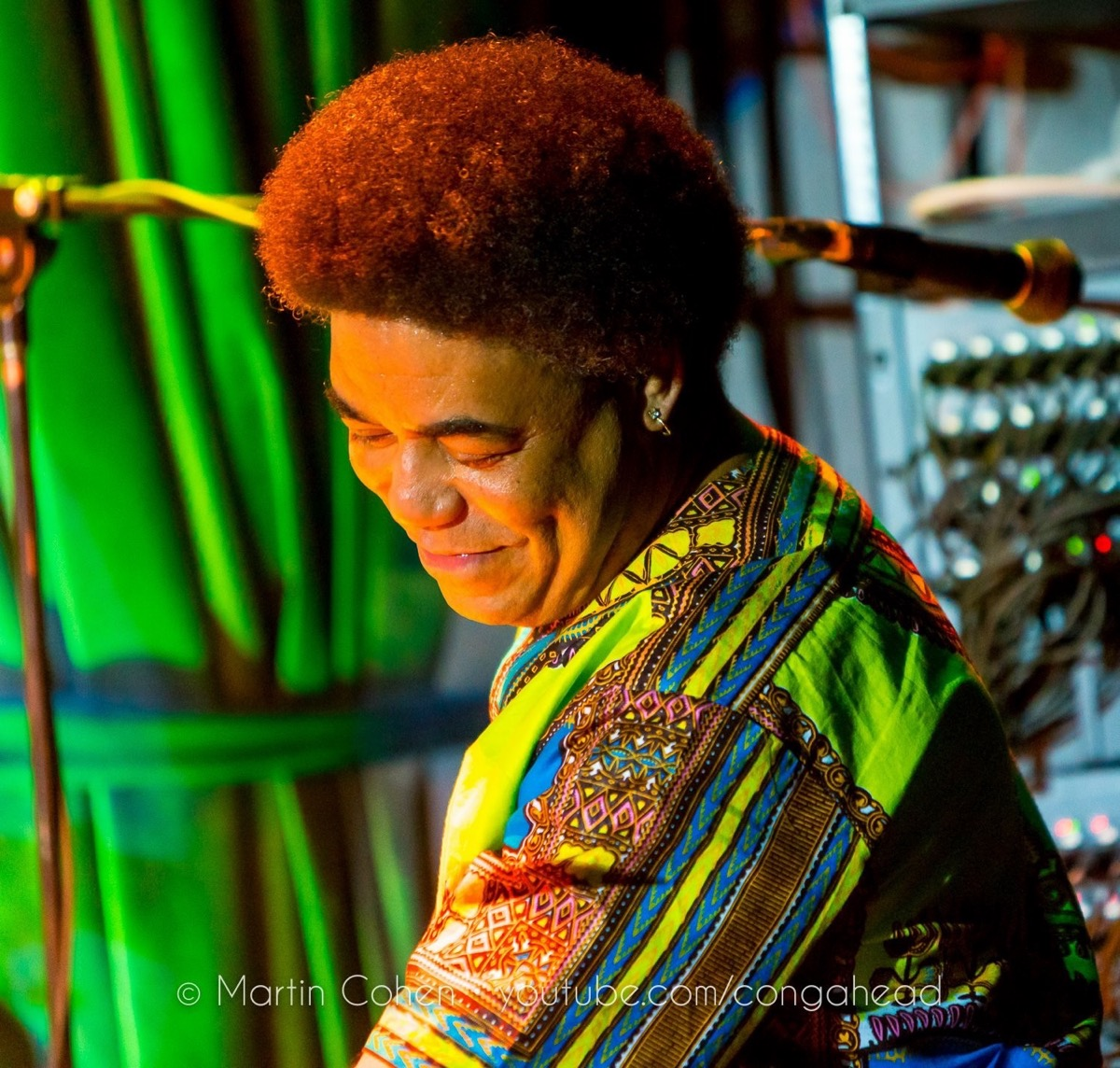
- Simpson at the Blue Note Jazz Club, New York, in 2016

Background information
- Born: 10 March 1964 (age 62); Camagüey, Cuba
- Genres: World; jazz; Afro-Caribbean; Afro-Cuban; Latin; funk
- Occupation: Musician
- Instruments: Drums; percussion; timbales
- Years active: 1990s–present
- Member of: NDR Bigband; Metropole Orkest
- Website: www.ernesto-simpson.com

Ernesto Simpson (born 10 March 1964) is a Cuban drummer of world, jazz, Afro-Caribbean, Afro-Cuban, Latin, and funk music. He is Grammy-nominated and internationally acclaimed, with over thirty years of performing, recording, touring, teaching, and session work alongside some the greatest names in the industry.

== Career ==
Born in Camagüey, Cuba, Simpson has collaborated with musicians including Dizzy Gillespie, Michel Legrand, Carmen McRae, Paquito D' Rivera, Arturo Sandoval, Ray Barretto, Mark Murphy, Chucho Valdés, Michael Brecker, Herbie Hancock, Mike Stern, Richard Bona, the Rodrigues Brothers, Brian Lynch, Manuel Valera, Michel Camilo, Gonzalo Rubalcalba, Hugh Masakela, Kyle Eastwood, Jason Rebello, Tim Garland, and Omar Sosa, among others.

Simpson is a guest drummer of the NDR Bigband and the Metropole Orkest.

He has performed on original motion picture scores, such as Random Hearts (1999) with Harrison Ford and For Love or Country: The Arturo Sandoval Story (2000) with Andy Garcia, in which he also made a cameo appearance.

== Personal life ==
Simpson has lived and worked in Havana, Cuba; Bogotá, Colombia; Miami, USA; and New York, USA; he currently splits his time between London, UK, and Athens, Greece, with his wife (and manager) Kate Bellia-Simpson.

== Discography ==
Sources:

- Omar Sosa and the NDR Big Band, Es:sensual (Otá, 2018) – drums, percussion
- Femi Temowo (featuring the Engines Orchestra), Music is the Feeling (Femitone / Engines Imprint, 2016) – drums
- Omar Sosa, Ilé (Otá, 2015) – drums, percussion, vocals
- Kyle Eastwood, Time Pieces (Jazz Village, 2015) – drums, arrangements
- Gonzalo Rubalcalba, Suite Caminos (5Passion, 2015) – drums
- Ramón Valle, Take Off (In+Out, 2015) – drums
- Phil Robson, The Immeasurable Code (Whirlwind, 2011) – drums
- Richard Bona, Bona Makes You Sweat (Universal Music Jazz France, 2008) – live in Hungary; drums
- Richard Bona, Tiki (Universal Music France, 2005) – drums
- Paquito D'Rivera, Jazz Clazz (Timba, 2010) – drums and timbales
- Arturo Sandoval, For Love or Country: The Arturo Sandoval Story (HBO Films, 2000; original motion picture soundtrack) – drums, percussion, arrangements
- Arturo Sandoval, My Passion for the Piano (Columbia, 2002) – drums
- Arturo Sandoval, Trumpet Evolution (Crescent Moon, 2003) – drums
- Arturo Sandoval, Americana (N-Coded Music, 1999) – drums
- Dave Grusin, Random Hearts OMPST – drums and percussion
- Brian Lynch, Con Clave – drums
- Helio Alves, Its Clear – drums
- Edy Martinez, Midnight Jazz Affair – drums
- Edy Martinez, Privilegio – drums
- Perspectiva Group, Tiembla Tierra – drums and timbales
- Manuel Valera, Vientos – drums
- Manuel Valera, Currents – drums
- Roberto Occhipinti, Yemaya – drums
- Samuel Torres, Skin Tones – drums and percussion
- Samuel Torres, Yaounde – drums
- Candy Dulfer, What Does It Take? – timbales
- Thalia, Thalia – drums
- Galy Galiano, Sin Fronteras – timbales
- John Di Martino, Romantic Jazz Trio: Jazz Mozart – drums
- Charlie Zaa, El Mas Grande Sentimiento – drums and drum synthesizer
- Pablo Mayor, Perro Amor TV Soap Opera/Colombia – drums
- Ricardo Eddy Martinez, Bolero Jazz: Misty – drums
- Olga Guillot, Faltaba Yo (WEA International, 2001) – drums and percussion
- Minione (Jopek/Rubacalba)

== Awards ==
Sources:

- 2010: Grammy nomination – Paquito D'Rivera, Jazz Clazz (2009)
- 2016: Grammy nomination – Gonzalo Rubalcaba, Suite Caminos (2015)
