= The Art of the Song =

Studio album by Charlie Haden
- Released: July 27, 1999
- Recorded: February 19–22, 1999
- Studio: Capitol Studio A (Hollywood)
- Genres: Jazz, vocal jazz
- Length: 65:53
- Label: Polygram
- Producers: Charlie Haden, Ruth Cameron

Charlie Haden chronology
The Montreal Tapes: Liberation Music Orchestra (1999)	The Art of the Song (1999)	Nocturne (2001)

Quartet West chronology
Now Is the Hour (1994)	The Art of the Song (1999)	The Private Collection (2007)

The Art of the Song is an album by jazz bassist Charlie Haden and his Quartet West, released in 1999. It reached number ten on the Billboard Top Jazz Albums chart.

Quartet West was formed in 1986. Their repertoire consisted mainly of music from the 1930s and 1940s, often music associated with films of that period.

Guest vocalists Bill Henderson and Shirley Horn each perform four songs.

The orchestral accompaniment written for Shirley Horn of Leonard Bernstein's "Lonely Town", won Alan Broadbent a Grammy Award.

== Reception ==
Professional ratings
Review scores
Source	Rating
AllMusic	4.5/5 stars
The Penguin Guide to Jazz Recordings	3.5/4 stars

John Sharpe in All About Jazz wrote that "The Art of the Song is an evocative collection of sombre ballads, immaculately performed". Richard S. Ginell of AllMusic wrote, "Frankly, this sounds like the work of a weary musician."

== Track listing ==
1. "Lonely Town" (Leonard Bernstein, Betty Comden, Adolph Green) – 5:30
2. "Why Did I Choose You" (Michael Leonard, Herbert Martin) – 7:23
3. "Moment Musical, Op. 16, No. 3 in B minor" (Sergei Rachmaninoff) – 5:36
4. "In Love in Vain" (Jerome Kern, Leo Rubin) – 5:05
5. "Ruth's Waltz" (Charlie Haden, Arthur Hamilton) – 4:14
6. "Scenes from a Silver Screen" (Alan Broadbent) – 6:24
7. "I'm Gonna Laugh You Right out of My Life" (Cy Coleman, Joseph A. McCarthy) – 6:15
8. "You My Love" (Jimmy Van Heusen, Mack Gordon) – 4:24
9. "Prelude en La Mineur" (Maurice Ravel) – 5:14
10. "The Folks Who Live On the Hill" (Jerome Kern, Oscar Hammerstein II) – 6:56
11. "Easy on the Heart" (Haden, Hamilton) – 4:54
12. "Theme for Charlie" (Jeri Southern) – 4:07
13. "Wayfaring Stranger" (Traditional) – 4:23

== Personnel ==
Charlie Haden Quartet West

- Charlie Haden – bass, lead vocal on "Wayfaring Stranger"
- Alan Broadbent – piano, arranger, conductor, orchestration
- Larance Marable – drums
- Ernie Watts – tenor saxophone

Guest musicians

- Murray Adler – violin, conductor, concertmaster, orchestra contractor
- Bill Henderson – vocals on "Why Did I Choose You", "Ruth's Waltz", "You My Love", "Easy on the Heart"
- Shirley Horn – vocals on "Lonely Town", "In Love in Vain", "I'm Gonna Laugh You Right Out of My Life", "The Folks Who Live on the Hill"

Orchestra

- Ezra Kliger – violin
- Gina Kronstadt – violin
- Don Palmer – violin
- Robert Peterson – violin
- Kathleen Robinson – violin
- Robert Sanov – violin
- Harry Shirinian – violin
- Paul Shure – violin
- Rachel Sokolow – violin
- Marcy Vaj – violin
- Francine Walsh – violin
- Tibor Zelig – violin
- Charlie Bisharat – violin
- Robert Brosseau – violin
- Bobby Bruce – violin
- Israel Baker – violin
- Russ Cantor – violin
- Suzanna Giordono – viola
- Steve Gordon – viola
- Paolo Gozzetti – viola
- Mimi Granat – viola
- Carol Mukagawa – viola
- Earl Madison – cello
- Ray Kelley – cello
- Suzie Katayama – cello
- Jerry Kessler – cello
- Larry Corbett – cello
- Adrian Rosen – bass
- Dennis Michael Trembly – bass

Production

- Charlie Haden – producer
- Ruth Cameron – producer
- Daniel Richard – executive producer
- Jean-Philippe Allard – executive producer
- Orrin Keepnews – liner notes
- Jay Newland – engineer, mastering, mixing, mixing engineer
- Dann Michael Thompson – engineer, mixing
- Glen Kolotkin – mastering
- Maureen Murphy – release coordinator
- John Newcott – release coordinator
- Carol Friedman – photography, cover photo
- Patrice Beausejour – art direction
- Greg Allen – photography
