= Not in Our Name (album) =

Studio album by Charlie Haden
- Released: August 2005
- Recorded: July 19–22, 2004
- Studio: Studio Forum Music Village, Rome
- Genre: Jazz
- Length: 68:57
- Label: Verve
- Producer: Charlie Haden, Carla Bley, Ruth Cameron

Charlie Haden chronology
Land of the Sun (2004)	Not in Our Name (2005)	Helium Tears (2005)

Liberation Music Orchestra chronology
The Montreal Tapes: Liberation Music Orchestra (1999)	Not in Our Name (2005)	Time/Life (2016)

Professional ratings
Review scores
Source	Rating
AllMusic	4/5 stars
The Penguin Guide to Jazz	3.5/4 stars

Not in Our Name is a jazz album by bassist Charlie Haden, recorded in 2004 and released by Verve Records in 2005.

The album is the fourth by Haden's Liberation Music Orchestra, the follow-up to Dream Keeper (1990).

== Reception ==
The Penguin Guide to Jazz wrote that "It's respectful but with a certain impatience over the routine sentimentalization of these lovely tunes, particularly at a time when the country is again at war."

== Track listing ==
1. "Not in our Name" (Charlie Haden) – 6:19
2. "This is Not America" (Pat Metheny, Lyle Mays, David Bowie) – 6:39
3. "Blue Anthem" (Bley) – 7:49
4. "America the Beautiful" (Medley) – 16:54
  1. "America the Beautiful" (Samuel A. Ward)
  2. "America the Beautiful" (Gary McFarland)
  3. "Lift Every Voice and Sing" (James Weldon Johnson, J. Rosamond Johnson)
  4. "Skies of America" (Ornette Coleman)
5. "Amazing Grace" (John Newton / traditional) – 7:12
6. "Goin' Home" (Antonín Dvořák) – 7:49
7. "Throughout" (Bill Frisell) – 8:55
8. "Adagio" (Samuel Barber) – 7:20

== Personnel ==
- Charlie Haden – bass
- Carla Bley – piano, arranger, conductor
- Michael Rodriguez – trumpet
- Seneca Black – trumpet
- Curtis Fowlkes – trombone
- Ahnee Sharon Freeman – French horn
- Joe Daley – tuba
- Miguel Zenón – alto saxophone
- Chris Cheek – tenor saxophone
- Tony Malaby – flute, tenor saxophone
- Steve Cardenas – guitar
- Matt Wilson – drums
