= Always Say Goodbye =

Studio album by Charlie Haden
- Released: March 1994
- Recorded: July 30 and August 1, 1993
- Studio: Ocean Way, Los Angeles
- Genre: Jazz
- Length: 69:47
- Label: Verve
- Producer: Charlie Haden, Hans Wendl

Charlie Haden chronology
Haunted Heart (1992)	Always Say Goodbye (1994)	The Montreal Tapes: with Don Cherry and Ed Blackwell (1994)

Quartet West chronology
Haunted Heart (1992)	Always Say Goodbye (1994)	Now Is the Hour (1996)

Always Say Goodbye is an album by American jazz bassist Charlie Haden's Quartet West, recorded in 1993 and released on the Verve label. The "intro" and the "ending" tracks feature excerpts from Howard Hawks' film The Big Sleep.

== Reception ==
Professional ratings
Review scores
Source	Rating
AllMusic	4/5 stars
The Penguin Guide to Jazz Recordings	3/4 stars

Eric Brace of The Washington Post wrote that the album "takes music and dialogue from films like Howard Hawks's The Big Sleep, and combines them with Quartet West originals and standards from past eras to create a romantic sound collage that won Down Beat magazine's Album of the Year award in 1994."

The AllMusic review by Daniel Gioffre stated, "Always Say Goodbye is part of the continuing Quartet West project by Haden, in which the venerable bassist attempts to evoke the spirit of Hollywood circa 1930-1940... The results, though at first a little bit unsettling, are quite spectacular... Highly recommended".

== Track listing ==
All compositions by Charlie Haden except as indicated.

1. Introduction (Max Steiner / Adolph Deutsch) - 0:58
2. "Always Say Goodbye" - 6:38
3. "Nice Eyes" - 5:04
4. "Relaxin' at Camarillo" (Charlie Parker) - 3:58
5. "Sunset Afternoon" (Alan Broadbent) - 4:13
6. "My Love and I [Love Song from Apache] (Johnny Mercer, David Raksin) - 3:19
7. "Alone Together" (Howard Dietz, Arthur Schwartz) - 5:21
8. "Our Spanish Love Song" - 6:07
9. "Background Music" (Warne Marsh) - 4:45
10. "Ou Es-Tu, Mon Amour? (Where Are You, My Love?)" (Henry Lemarchand, Emil Stern) - 6:44
11. "Avenue of Stars" (Broadbent) - 5:52
12. "Low Key Lightly [Variation on the Theme of Hero to Zero]" (Duke Ellington) - 4:52
13. "Celia" (Bud Powell) - 4:57
14. "Everything Happens to Me" (Tom Adair, Matt Dennis) - 6:25
15. Ending - 0:34

== Personnel ==
- Charlie Haden – bass
- Ernie Watts – tenor saxophone
- Alan Broadbent – piano
- Larance Marable – drums
- Stéphane Grappelli – violin (track 10)
