= Last Dance (album) =

Studio album by Keith Jarrett and Charlie Haden
- Released: June 13, 2014
- Recorded: March 2007
- Studio: Cavelight Studio; Oxford Township, New Jersey
- Genre: Jazz
- Length: 1:16:00
- Label: ECM 2399
- Producer: Keith Jarrett

Keith Jarrett albums chronology
No End (2013)	Last Dance (2014)	Hamburg '72 (2014)

Charlie Haden albums chronology
Come Sunday (2012)	Last Dance (2014)	Charlie Haden/Jim Hall (2014)

Last Dance is an album by American pianist and composer Keith Jarrett and American jazz double bass player Charlie Haden—long-term collaborators—recorded at Jarrett's home studio in March 2007 and released on ECM in June 2014 containing outtakes and two alternate takes from Jasmine, released four years previously.

== Reception ==
Professional ratings
Review scores
Source	Rating
All About Jazz	4.5/5 stars
AllMusic	4/5 stars
The Guardian	4/5 stars

In a review for AllMusic, Thom Jurek wrote: "They don't overstate anything; the music provides meaning all on its own. They relax into its beauty playing toward one another as hints, suggestions, and references to popular music history bridge the space between. Last Dance is a necessary addendum to Jasmine; it fleshes out the confident, mature, amiable, and eloquent speech in the canonical language these two jazz masters share."

John Kelman, in a review for All About Jazz, stated: "The same strengths that made Jasmine such a wonderful—and welcome—diversion from Jarrett's solo and trio releases remain definitive on Last Dance. Haden demonstrates his usual unerring ability to find the absolutely perfect note—played with equally impeccable tone... there's never a note wasted or a note out of place. As for Jarrett, while his career has been predicated on both virtuosity and an ability to spontaneously pull music from the ether, and as consistently superb as his solo and Standards Trio work has been over the past three decades, here in this context, he's never sounded so relaxed, so unfettered in a way that's different from his inimitable freedom in live performance... Last Dance will stand, alongside Jasmine, as two of [Jarrett's] most beautiful and intimate recordings, played with a lifelong friend who, despite a thirty-year gap in their musical partnership, came back as if time had stood still and not a second had passed since they'd last collaborated."

Writing for The Guardian, John Fordham commented: "Casually overheard, these exchanges can sound like superior lounge-jazz in their soft bass-walks, demurely stroked chords and piano improvisations; lean a little closer, however, and Jarrett's timing and sense of space, plus Haden's spontaneous countermelodies, continue to provide low-lit delights... As with Jasmine, there are plenty of rapturous love songs... but for all their warm glow, this duo constantly invests them with strength and urgency. It's just as good as Jasmine, and hopefully not a Last Dance for this partnership."

Tyran Grillo of Between Sound and Space wrote: "From the first few steps of 'My Old Flame,' it's clear these two men walk not together but along complementary paths, their shadows interlocking at any point along the trajectory of a tune. And by this forlorn song’s guiding hand, held above the starving ear like that of a Reiki master, an inner heat comes through. There is an album's worth of feeling in this opener alone, and its flame is sustained in all that follows... The musicians are achingly present, even as they transcend minds toward lyrical enlightenment. They flip through the Great American Songbook not as one might a newspaper, but resolutely and sincerely, as if it were scripture... Given the lengths of these tunes (averaging about nine minutes each), I like to think that Haden and Jarrett might have spun any of them into a lifetime of improvisation. And perhaps, in a way, they already have. They play off each other so artfully before trading a single solo that solos begin to feel more like roots than departures. No matter how virtuosic their skills, the melody remains forever paramount... If Jarrett is the body, Haden is the soul."

== Track listing ==
1. "My Old Flame" (Sam Coslow-Arthur Johnston) (10:18)
2. "My Ship" (Ira Gershwin-Kurt Weill) 9:36)
3. "'Round Midnight" (Thelonious Monk-Cootie Williams) (9:34)
4. "Dance of the Infidels" (Bud Powell) (4:23)
5. "It Might As Well Be Spring" (Oscar Hammerstein II-Richard Rodgers) (11:54)
6. "Everything Happens to Me" (Thomas Adair-Matt Dennis) (7:12)
7. "Where Can I Go Without You" (Alternate Take) (Peggy Lee-Victor Young) (9:32)
8. "Every Time We Say Goodbye" (Cole Porter) (4:25)
9. "Goodbye" (Alternate Take) (Gordon Jenkins) (9:07)

== Production ==
- Keith Jarrett – piano
- Charlie Haden – double bass

Production

- Keith Jarrett – recording producer
- Manfred Eicher – executive producer, engineer (mastering)
- Martin Pearson – engineer (recording)
- Christoph Stickel – engineer (mastering)
- Sascha Kleis – cover design

== Charts ==
Chart (2014)	Peak position
Austrian Albums (Ö3 Austria)	31
Belgian Albums (Ultratop Flanders)	45
Belgian Albums (Ultratop Wallonia)	52
French Albums (SNEP)	19
German Albums (Offizielle Top 100)	21
Swiss Albums (Schweizer Hitparade)	30
UK Independent Albums (OCC)	20
UK Jazz & Blues Albums (OCC)	4
