= Suite Caminos =

Studio album by Gonzalo Rubalcaba
- Released: 2015
- Genre: Latin jazz
- Label: 5Passion

Gonzalo Rubalcaba chronology
Live Faith (2014)	Suite Caminos (2015)	Tokyo Adagio (2015)

Suite Caminos is a 2015 album by Gonzalo Rubalcaba. It earned Rubalcaba a Grammy Award nomination for Best Latin Jazz Album. The album contains "an eight-section recitative” scored for alto (Will Vinson) and tenor (Seamus Blake) saxophones, trumpet (Alex Sipiagin), guitar (Adam Rogers), bass (Matt Brewer) and drums (Ernesto Simpson), a core of Miami-based Yoruba practitioners, and Rubalcaba himself on piano, organ and synthesizers." John McLaughlin guests on one track.

== Track list ==
No.	Title	Length
1.	"Sendero De Aliento"	9:08
2.	"El Hijo Mensajero"	9:21
3.	"Destino Sin Fin"	10:00
4.	"Sendero De Espuma"	14:44
5.	"Santa Meta"	10:57
6.	"Alameda De Vientos" (feat. John McLaughlin)	9:24
7.	"Via Prodigiosa"	6:30
8.	"Ronda De Suerte"	13:36

== Personnel ==
- Seamus Blake – tenor sax
- Matt Brewer – upright bass
- Sonyalsi “Sonia” Feldman – vocals (tracks 4, 5), chorus
- Mario Hidalgo – vocals (track 1)
- Pedrito Martinez – vocals (tracks 2, 3, 7, 8), chorus, percussion
- John McLaughlin – electric guitar (track 6)
- Adam Rogers – guitars
- Gonzalo Rubalcaba – piano, synths, palmadas, tambor
- Ernesto Simpson – drums
- Alex Sipiagin – trumpet, flugelhorn
- Will Vinson – alto sax, soprano sax
