= Beyond the Missouri Sky (Short Stories) =

Studio album by Charlie Haden and Pat Metheny
- Released: February 25, 1997
- Recorded: Dates before and April 15, 1996
- Studios: Right Track, New York City
- Genre: Jazz
- Length: 69:11
- Label: Verve
- Producers: Charlie Haden, Pat Metheny

Charlie Haden chronology
Now Is the Hour (1996)	Beyond the Missouri Sky (Short Stories) (1997)	None but the Lonely Heart (1997)

Pat Metheny chronology
Quartet (1996)	Beyond the Missouri Sky (Short Stories) (1997)	Imaginary Day (1997)

Beyond the Missouri Sky (Short Stories) is a jazz album by the bassist Charlie Haden and the guitarist Pat Metheny. It won the Grammy Award for Best Jazz Instrumental Performance.

== Composition ==
"Tears of Rain" is an original composition for this project by Metheny, recorded with his sitar-guitar. In the CD booklet, Haden writes that Johnny Mandel's "The Moon Song" had never been recorded before, unaware of pianist Fred Hersch's 1994 recording of this composition first released in 1996.

== Reception ==
The Penguin Guide to Jazz selected the album as part of its suggested Core Collection. AllMusic called it "a fine record when the material is happening, but a bit of a chore when it is not".

Professional ratings
Review scores
Source	Rating
AllMusic	3/5 stars
The Encyclopedia of Popular Music	4/5 stars
The Penguin Guide to Jazz	4/4 stars

== Track listing ==
No.	Title	Writer(s)	Length
1.	"Waltz for Ruth"	Charlie Haden	4:28
2.	"Our Spanish Love Song"	Charlie Haden	5:40
3.	"Message to a Friend"	Pat Metheny	6:13
4.	"Two for the Road"	Henry Mancini, Leslie Bricusse	5:16
5.	"First Song (for Ruth)"	Charlie Haden	6:37
6.	"The Moon Is a Harsh Mistress"	Jimmy Webb	4:05
7.	"The Precious Jewel"	Roy Acuff	3:47
8.	"He's Gone Away"	Traditional	4:18
9.	"The Moon Song"	Johnny Mandel	6:56
10.	"Tears of Rain"	Pat Metheny	5:30
11.	"Cinema Paradiso" (Love Theme)	Andrea Morricone	3:35
12.	"Cinema Paradiso" (Main Theme)	Ennio Morricone	4:24
13.	"Spiritual"	Josh Haden	8:22

== Personnel ==
- Charlie Haden – double bass
- Pat Metheny – acoustic guitars and all other instruments

Technical personnel

- Charlie Haden, Pat Metheny – producers
- Jean-Philippe Allard, Daniel Richard – executive producers
- Jay Newland – recording, mixing
- Ted Jensen – mastering at Sterling Sound, NYC, USA
- Latifa Azhar, Janush Kawa – session photography
- CB Graphic – design
- Patrice Beausejour – art director

== Awards ==
1997 – 40th Annual GRAMMY Awards

Year	Category
1998	Grammy Award for Best Jazz Instrumental Performance
