= Now Is the Hour (Charlie Haden album) =

Studio album by Charlie Haden
- Released: April 1996
- Recorded: July 18–20, 1995
- Genre: Jazz
- Length: 59:38
- Label: Verve
- Producer: Charlie Haden and Ruth Cameron

Charlie Haden chronology
Steal Away (1995)	Now Is the Hour (1996)	Beyond the Missouri Sky (1997)

Quartet West chronology
Always Say Goodbye (1994)	Now Is the Hour (1996)	The Art of the Song (1999)

Now Is the Hour is an album by the American jazz bassist Charlie Haden's Quartet West, released in 1996 on the Verve label.

== Reception ==
The AllMusic review by Tim Sheridan stated: "Seldom does modern music so perfectly evoke a time and place in history as this terrific band. Fans of Haden's Liberation Music Orchestra will find the simple accessibility either surprising or disappointing, but fans of classic, romantic jazz will find joy".

Professional ratings
Review scores
Source	Rating
AllMusic	4/5 stars
The Penguin Guide to Jazz Recordings	3/4 stars

== Track listing ==
All compositions by Charlie Haden except as indicated

1. "Here's Looking at You" - 6:11
2. "The Left Hand of God" (Victor Young) - 7:48
3. "Requiem" (Lennie Tristano) - 1:31
4. "Back Home Blues" (Charlie Parker) - 4:04
5. "There in a Dream" - 7:04
6. "All Through the Night" (Cole Porter) - 4:12
7. "Detour Ahead" (Lou Carter, Herb Ellis, Johnny Frigo) - 6:04
8. "Blue Pearl" (Bud Powell) - 4:32
9. "When Tomorrow Comes" (Alan Broadbent) - 4:37
10. "Palo Alto" (Lee Konitz) - 4:54
11. "Marables's Parable" - 3:30
12. "Now Is the Hour (Haere Ra)" (Maewa Kaihau, Clement Scott, Dorothy Stewart) - 4:58

- Recorded at Studios Guillaume Tell in Suresnes-Paris, France on July 18–20, 1995

== Personnel ==
- Charlie Haden – bass
- Ernie Watts – tenor saxophone
- Alan Broadbent – piano
- Larance Marable – drums
- String Orchestra arranged and conducted by Alan Broadbent (tracks 1–3, 5, 7, 9 & 12)
