= Hamburg '72 =

Live album by Keith Jarrett
- Released: November 21, 2014
- Recorded: June 14, 1972
- Studios: NDR Jazz Workshop; Hamburg, West Germany
- Genre: Jazz
- Length: 55:22
- Label: ECM 2422
- Producer: Manfred Eicher

Keith Jarrett chronology
Last Dance (2014)	Hamburg '72 (2014)	Creation (2015)

Keith Jarrett American Group chronology
Eyes of the Heart (1979)	Hamburg '72 (2014)

Hamburg '72 is a live album by Keith Jarrett recorded in West Germany on June 14, 1972, and released on the ECM label in November 2014. The trio—Jarrett's first—features rhythm section Charlie Haden and Paul Motian, both of whom died before the album's release.

== 1972 mini-European Tour ==
Hamburg '72 was recorded in concert during a European mini-tour in which, according to www.keithjarrett.org, Jarrett's first trio offered recitals in Hungary, France and Germany:

- 3 June - Székesfehérvár, (Hungary) - Alba Regia Jazz Festival
- 9 June - Studio 104, Maison de la Radio, Paris, (France)
- 12 June - Munich (Germany)
- 14 June - Funkhaus, NDR Jazz Workshop, Hamburg, (Germany)
- 16 June - Skulpturengarten, Neue Nationalgalerie, Berlin, (Germany)

== Reception ==
Professional ratings
Review scores
Source	Rating
All About Jazz	5/5 stars
AllMusic	4/5 stars
The Observer	5/5 stars

The album received several positive reviews on release. The AllMusic review by Thom Jurek awarded the album 4 stars, stating, "Hamburg '72 is not only an excellent archival recording that documents one of jazz's most capable, sophisticated trios, it is expansive, inspiring modern jazz at its best, and it continues to resonate and inspire."

The Observer's Dave Gelly called it "an invaluable memento of an unrepeatable group".

All About Jazz's John Kelman observed: "Hamburg '72 is a true milestone from the first of its 56 minutes to the last—a classic once lost, but now found again and sounding better than ever."

JazzTimes' Thomas Conrad said: "By 1972, [Jarrett's] taut, dramatic timing, his personal harmonic concept and especially his touch were in place. He could already make piano notes hang forever in the air. He is equally capable of rocking the Funkhaus to its foundations."

== Track listing ==
All compositions by Keith Jarrett, except as indicated

No.	Title	Writer(s)	Length
1.	"Rainbow"	Margot Jarrett	9:52
2.	"Everything That Lives Laments"		9:44
3.	"Piece for Ornette"		9:32
4.	"Take Me Back"		8:07
5.	"Life, Dance"		2:59
6.	"Song for Che"	Charlie Haden	15:08
Total length:			55:22

== Personnel ==
- Keith Jarrett – piano, soprano saxophone, flute, percussion
- Charlie Haden – double bass
- Paul Motian – drums

Production

- Manfred Eicher - producer, remixing
- Michael Naura - radio producer
- Hans-Heinrich Breitkreuz - engineer (recording)
- Jan Erik Kongshaug - engineer (remixing: July 2014)
- Sascha Kleis - design
- Johanness Anders - photography
