= The Montreal Tapes: Liberation Music Orchestra =

Live album by Charlie Haden
- Released: April 1999
- Recorded: July 8, 1989
- Venue: Quebec, Canada
- Genre: Jazz
- Length: 76:21
- Label: Verve
- Producer: Ruth Cameron

Charlie Haden chronology
None but the Lonely Heart (1998)	The Montreal Tapes: Liberation Music Orchestra (1999)	The Art of the Song (1999)

Liberation Music Orchestra chronology
Dream Keeper (1990)	The Montreal Tapes: Liberation Music Orchestra (1999)	Not in Our Name (2005)

The Montreal Tapes: Liberation Music Orchestra is a live album by the American jazz bassist Charlie Haden's Liberation Music Orchestra recorded in 1989 at the Montreal International Jazz Festival and released on the Verve label.

== Reception ==
The AllMusic review by Don Snowden awarded the album 4 stars, stating, "Can't say this is the pick of the group's discs or even of Haden's The Montreal Tapes series, but the musicians play up to the occasion (Geri Allen, in particular, shines) and man, that version of "We Shall Overcome..."".

Professional ratings
Review scores
Source	Rating
AllMusic	4/5 stars

== Track listing ==
All compositions by Charlie Haden except as indicated

1. "La Pasionaria" - 24:00
2. "Silence" - 6:24
3. "Sandino" - 8:37
4. "We Shall Overcome" (Guy Carawan, Frank Hamilton, Zilphia Horton, Pete Seeger) - 37:20

- Recorded at the Festival de Jazz de Montreal in Canada on July 8, 1989

== Personnel ==
- Charlie Haden – bass
- Ken McIntyre - alto saxophone
- Ernie Watts, Joe Lovano - tenor saxophone
- Stanton Davis, Tom Harrell - trumpet
- Ray Anderson - trombone
- Sharon Freeman - French horn
- Joe Daley - tuba
- Mick Goodrick - guitar
- Geri Allen - piano
- Paul Motian - drums
