= First Song =

Studio album by Charlie Haden
- Released: 1992
- Recorded: April 26, 1990
- Genre: Jazz
- Length: 60:11
- Label: Soul Note
- Producer: Giovanni Bonandrini

Charlie Haden chronology
Live at the Village Vanguard (1991)	First Song (1992)	Haunted Heart (1992)

First Song is an album by the American jazz bassist Charlie Haden recorded in 1990 and released on the Italian Soul Note label in 1992. The album features Haden playing with pianist Enrico Pieranunzi and drummer Billy Higgins, playing a mix of jazz standards and originals by Haden and Pieranunzi. The three musicians had previously recorded together in 1987, along with trumpeter Chet Baker, on Haden's album Silence.

== Reception ==
The Allmusic review awarded the album 3 stars.

Professional ratings
Review scores
Source	Rating
Allmusic	3/5 stars
The Penguin Guide to Jazz Recordings	3.5/4 stars

== Track listing ==
All compositions by Charlie Haden except where noted.

1. "First Song" - 10:06
2. "Je Ne Sais Quoi" (Enrico Pieranunzi) - 5:42
3. "Polka Dots and Moonbeams" (Johnny Burke, Jimmy Van Heusen) - 6:46
4. "Lennie's Pennies" (Lennie Tristano) - 7:03
5. "News Break" (Pieranunzi) - 5:06
6. "All the Way" (Sammy Cahn, Van Heusen) - 6:30
7. "Si Si" (Charlie Parker) - 10:34
8. "For Turiya" - 3:30
9. "In the Moment" - 4:54
- Recorded at Barigozzi Studio in Milano, Italy on April 26, 1990

== Personnel ==
- Charlie Haden – bass
- Enrico Pieranunzi – piano
- Billy Higgins – drums
