= Come Sunday (album) =

Studio album by Charlie Haden and Hank Jones
- Released: January 10, 2012
- Recorded: February 2–3, 2010
- Genre: Jazz, gospel, spirituals
- Length: 42:15
- Label: EmArcy
- Producer: Jean-Philippe Allard, Ruth Cameron, Charlie Haden

Charlie Haden chronology
| Sophisticated Ladies (2010) | Come Sunday (2012) | Last Dance (2014) |

Hank Jones chronology
| Last Recording (2010) | Come Sunday (2012) | Alone Together (2012) |

Come Sunday is a studio album of Christian hymns and spirituals by the jazz double bassist Charlie Haden and the pianist Hank Jones. It was recorded only a few months before Jones's death in May 2010. It was Haden and Jones's second album in this vein since 1994's Steal Away. Come Sunday peaked at number 4 on the Billboard Top Jazz Albums chart, 10 on the Billboard Top Christian Albums Chart and at 6 on Billboard Top Gospel Albums Chart.

== Reception ==
The album was positively reviewed by Thom Jurek at AllMusic, who wrote, "Ultimately, Come Sunday might have fared a little better by replacing the carols with more hymns, because the former are so staid. But that's a small complaint. At its best, Come Sunday is lovely, elegant, and even stirring." Jurek also critiqued the quality of recording writing that its predecessor Steal Away writing that "...digital recording has been vastly improved upon since the 1990s. On Steal Away some of the warmth afforded a duo like this naturally was blunted because any sense of real depth was virtually unable to be captured on tape, reducing the sense of intimacy. On Come Sunday, it looms large; the studio room itself becomes an equal participant in these sessions – it reflects back everything, from the sounds of piano pedals and fingers on keys to bass strings being pulled and plucked. This is a huge plus; that spaciousness allows the listener to get front-pew close and hear the natural warmth in the playing."

Mark F. Turner reviewed Come Sunday for All About Jazz and wrote that the album "serves as a reminder of his [Jones's] lyrical touch, accompanied here by Haden's empathy and resonance. ...At 91, his melodicism and technical abilities continue to astound, whether swinging gracefully on 'Down by the Riverside' or gently on 'Bringing In The Sheaves', as Haden's workmanship guides with unassuming assurance. The two seemed to be enjoying themselves immensely, keeping the tunes pretty much intact but also illuminating their inner qualities, as the swanky cadence of 'Give Me That Old Time Religion' silently echoes the song's sentiment, 'It's good enough for me'. ...From the duo's unobtrusive interpretations to the way in which the Jones and Haden communicate, the melodies contain a quiet magic whose crowning jewel is found in the beloved title track, written by the great Duke Ellington. It is an apropos sentiment to this moving release".

== Track listing ==
1. "Take My Hand, Precious Lord" (Thomas A. Dorsey) – 4:25
2. "God Rest Ye Merry, Gentlemen" (Traditional) – 2:29
3. "Down by the Riverside" (Traditional) – 2:58
4. "Going Home" (Traditional, based on the Largo of Antonín Dvořák's Symphony No. 9, "The New World") – 4:11
5. "Blessed Assurance" (Fanny Crosby, Phoebe P. Knapp, Egbert Van Alstyne) – 2:08
6. "It Came Upon the Midnight Clear" (Edmund Hamilton Sears, Richard Storrs Willis) – 2:58
7. "Bringing In the Sheaves" (George Minor, Knowles Shaw) – 2:53
8. "Deep River" (Traditional) – 1:56
9. "Give Me That Old Time Religion" (Traditional) – 2:59
10. "Sweet Hour of Prayer" (William B. Bradbury, William W. Walford) – 2:29
11. "The Old Rugged Cross" (George Bennard) – 3:56
12. "Were You There When They Crucified My Lord?" (Traditional) – 3:08
13. "Nearer My God to Thee" (Sarah Flower Adams) – 2:16
14. "Come Sunday" (Duke Ellington) – 3:29

== Personnel ==
- Charlie Haden – double bass, arranger, producer
- Hank Jones – piano, arranger

Production

- Jean-Philippe Allard – a&r, executive producer
- Matt Read – art direction
- Tom Gloady, Ted Tuthill – assistant engineer
- Spencer Zahn Assistant
- Patrice Beauséjour – cover art
- Anna Kendler – design
- Jay Newland – engineer, mixing
- Maurice Jackson – liner notes
- Mark Wilder – mastering
- Ruth Cameron – photography, producer
- Cheung Ching Ming – photography
- Francesca Hughes – preparation for release
- Farida Bachir – production manager
- Joe D'Ambrosio – project coordinator
- Wulf Müller – project supervisor
