= Dream Keeper =

Studio album by Charlie Haden and the Liberation Music Orchestra
- Released: October 1990
- Recorded: April 4–5, 1990
- Studio: Clinton, NYC
- Genre: Jazz
- Length: 48:23
- Label: DIW (Japan); Polydor (US/France); Blue Note (1991 reissue)
- Producer: Hans Wendl

Charlie Haden and the Liberation Music Orchestra chronology
| Dialogues (1990) | Dream Keeper (1990) | Live at the Village Vanguard (1991) |

Liberation Music Orchestra chronology
| The Ballad of the Fallen (1983) | Dream Keeper (1990) | The Montreal Tapes: Liberation Music Orchestra (1999) |

Dream Keeper is an album by jazz bassist Charlie Haden with his Liberation Music Orchestra, recorded in 1990 and released in Japan on DIW Records and in the US through Polydor Records. It was reissued in the US the following year on Blue Note Records.

This album is the first by Haden's Liberation Music Orchestra since The Ballad of the Fallen (1983).

== Critical reception ==
Professional ratings
Review scores
| Source | Rating |
|---|---|
| AllMusic | 4/5 stars |
| DownBeat | 5/5 stars |

DownBeat's Art Lange wrote, "How rare it is to hear music —beautiful, inspiring music—with a conscience and a soul".

The album was nominated for a Grammy Award for Best Large Jazz Ensemble Performance and was voted "Jazz album of the year" in DownBeat's 1991 critics' poll. Haden, Carla Bley and Ray Anderson also placed first in that year's Acoustic Bass, Composer and Trombone poll categories, respectively.

== Track listing ==
1. "Dream Keeper" (Bley, Langston Hughes, Traditional) – 16:51

"Dream Keeper Part 1" (Bley)
"Feliciano Ama" (trad. from El Salvador)
"Dream Keeper Part II" (Bley)
"Canto del Pilon (I)" (trad. from Venezuela)
"Dream Keeper Part III" (Bley)
"Canto del Pilon (II)" (trad. from Venezuela)
"Hymn of the Anarchist Women's Movement" (trad. from Spanish Civil War)
"Dream Keeper Part IV" (Bley)

2. "Rabo de Nube" (Silvio Rodríguez) – 5:23
3. "Nkosi Sikelel'i Afrika" (Enoch Sontonga) – 10:31
4. "Sandino" (Haden) – 6:39
5. "Spiritual" (Haden) – 8:59

== Personnel ==
- Tom Harrell – trumpet, flugelhorn
- Earl Gardner – trumpet
- Dewey Redman – tenor saxophone
- Joe Lovano – tenor saxophone, flute
- Branford Marsalis – tenor saxophone, flute
- Ken McIntyre – alto saxophone
- Ray Anderson – trombone
- Sharon Freeman – French horn
- Joseph Daley – tuba
- Juan Lazaro Mendolas – wood flute, pan flute
- Amina Claudine Myers – piano
- Mick Goodrick – guitar
- Charlie Haden – double bass
- Paul Motian – drums
- Don Alias – percussion
- Carla Bley – arranger, conductor
- The Oakland Youth Chorus, Elizabeth Min, director
