= Dialogues (Carlos Paredes & Charlie Haden album) =

Studio album by Charlie Haden and Carlos Paredes
- Released: September 1990
- Recorded: January 28–29, 1990
- Genre: Jazz
- Length: 47:09
- Label: Antilles
- Producer: Charlie Haden

Charlie Haden chronology
Silence (1989)	Dialogues (1990)	Dream Keeper (1990)

Carlos Paredes chronology
Espelho de Sons (1988)	Dialogues (1990)	É Preciso Um País (1994)

Dialogues is an album by guitarist Carlos Paredes and bassist Charlie Haden recorded in 1990 and released on the Antilles label.

== Reception ==
The Allmusic review by Richard S. Ginell awarded the album 3 stars, stating, "Even for the adventurous Charlie Haden, this encounter with the Portuguese guitarist Carlos Paredes is pretty unusual... World music fans thus will probably find it easier going than the average jazz browser".

Professional ratings
Review scores
Source	Rating
Allmusic	3/5 stars

== Track listing ==
All compositions by Carlos Parades except as indicated

1. "Asas Sobre O Mundo/Nas Asas da Saudade" - 3:02
2. "Dança Dos Camponeses" - 2:35
3. "Canto de Trabalho" - 9:22
4. "Marionetas" - 2:38
5. "Song for Ché" (Charlie Haden) - 7:15
6. "Balada de Coimbra" (Elyseu) - 2:38
7. "Divertimento" - 2:39
8. "Variações Sobre O Fado de Artur Paredes I de Conçalo" (Artur Paredes, Gonçalo Paredes) - 2:52
9. "Verdes Anos" - 14:08
- Recorded at Studio Acousti in Paris, France, on January 28 and 29, 1990

== Personnel ==
- Carlos Paredes — Portuguese guitar
- Charlie Haden — bass
