= Tokyo Adagio =

Live album by Charlie Haden and Gonzalo Rubalcaba
- Released: June 5, 2015
- Recorded: March 16–19, 2005
- Venue: Blue Note Jazz Club, Tokyo
- Genre: Jazz
- Length: 51:46
- Label: Impulse! 472 992-6
- Producer: Charlie Haden, Rutch Cameron-Haden and Jean-Philippe Allard

Charlie Haden chronology
Charlie Haden/Jim Hall (2014)	Tokyo Adagio (2015)	Time/Life (2016)

Gonzalo Rubalcaba chronology
Suite Caminos (2015)	Tokyo Adagio (2015)	Charlie (2015)

Tokyo Adagio is a live album by American bassist Charlie Haden and pianist Gonzalo Rubalcaba recorded in 2005 at the Blue Note Jazz Club in Tokyo and released on the Impulse! label in 2015 shortly after Haden's death.

== Reception ==
Professional ratings
Review scores
Source	Rating
PopMatters	8/10 stars
Audiophile Audition	4.5/5 stars
The Irish Times	4/5 stars

PopMatters awarded the album 8 stars out of 10 and said, "In the end, we hear the true poetry of playing between these two—and Rubalcaba is never less than stunning here—and the connection between this and the spirit world made through these six compositions. As it all winds to a close you can’t help but turn the record over one more time in your mind, retrace your steps back to the beginning where the notes and the journey all started. It all makes you thankful that this record happened and that there were once men like Charlie Haden to walk the earth". Writing for Audiophile Audition Jeff Krow observed "What is universal to all the tracks is a gentleness, and sense of an intuitive late night conversation between two soul mates who had not seen each other for a long time, yet can regain their connection within minutes of reuniting. Even the up-tempo numbers do not change the mood set by this duo. Thank goodness that the folks at Impulse Records saw fit to honor the wishes of Charlie Haden, to make sure his musical friendship with Gonzalo was shared with the world. For late night contemplation Tokyo Adagio can’t be beat". Cormac Larkin of The Irish Times said "This live 2005 recording from a Tokyo club captures two friends in a soft- spoken conversation – a talented pianist with a romantic heart, and a bassist who had the generosity and empathy to help it to sing".

== Track listing ==
1. "En la Orilla del Mundo (The Edge of the World)" (Martín Rojas) - 9:05
2. "My Love and I" (David Raksin, Johnny Mercer) - 11:54
3. "When Will the Blues Leave" (Ornette Coleman) - 8:29
4. "Sandino" (Charlie Haden) - 5:47
5. "Solamente Una Vez (You Belong to My Heart)" (Agustín Lara) - 9:12
6. "Transparence" (Gonzalo Rubalcaba) - 7:19

== Personnel ==
- Charlie Haden – bass
- Gonzalo Rubalcaba – piano
