= Etudes (Charlie Haden album) =

Studio album by Charlie Haden and Paul Motian featuring Geri Allen
- Released: 1988
- Recorded: September 14–15, 1987
- Genre: Post-bop, free jazz, M-Base
- Length: 48:34
- Label: Soul Note
- Producer: Giovanni Bonandrini

Charlie Haden chronology
In Angel City (1988)	Etudes (1988)	Silence (1989)

Etudes is an album by the American jazz bassist Charlie Haden and drummer Paul Motian, recorded in 1987 and released on the Italian Soul Note label in 1988. Haden and Motian were joined by pianist Geri Allen, with whom they had worked in her own trio.

== Reception ==
The AllMusic review by Scott Yanow stated, "The communication between these three masterful players is quite impressive".

Professional ratings
Review scores
Source	Rating
AllMusic	4.5/5 stars
The Penguin Guide to Jazz Recordings	3.5/4 stars

== Track listing ==
All compositions by Charlie Haden except as indicated

1. "Lonely Woman" (Ornette Coleman) - 9:55
2. "Dolphy's Dance" (Geri Allen) - 4:00
3. "Sandino" - 4:43
4. "Fiasco" (Paul Motian) - 5:38
5. "Etude II" (Motian) - 2:07
6. "Blues in Motian" - 6:59
7. "Silence" - 6:36
8. "Shuffle Montgomery" (Herbie Nichols) - 6:24
9. "Etude I" (Motian) - 2:12
  - Recorded at Sound Ideas Studios in New York City on September 14 & 15, 1987

== Personnel ==
- Charlie Haden – bass
- Paul Motian – percussion
- Geri Allen – piano
