= Charlie Haden/Jim Hall =

Live album by Charlie Haden and Jim Hall
- Released: September 30, 2014
- Recorded: July 2, 1990
- Venue: Montreal International Jazz Festival, Canada
- Genre: Jazz
- Length: 75:59
- Label: Impulse! B002176502
- Producer: Jean-Philippe Allard

Charlie Haden chronology
Last Dance (2014)	Charlie Haden/Jim Hall (2014)	Tokyo Adagio (2015)

Jim Hall chronology
Live at Birdland (2012)	Charlie Haden/Jim Hall (2014)	Valse Hot - Sweet Basil - 1978 (2016)

Charlie Haden/Jim Hall is an album by bassist Charlie Haden and guitarist Jim Hall recorded in 1990 at the Montreal International Jazz Festival by Jazz Beat and released on the Impulse! label in 2014 following the deaths of both artists.

== Reception ==
Professional ratings
Review scores
Source	Rating
Allmusic	4.5/5 stars
PopMatters	7/10 stars
The Absolute Sound	5/5 stars
The Irish Times	4/5 stars

Allmusic awarded the album 4 1/2 stars, with the review by Thom Jurek stating, "Bassist Charlie Haden and guitarist Jim Hall played a number of duet concerts together over the years, but this was certainly among the very earliest. Given their respective careers up to this point, both men had nearly perfected the artistry of playing in this particular chamber jazz setting. That all said, it does not prepare the listener for the canny, intimate, yet absolutely electric interplay on offer here ... This set is not only impossible to criticize, but adds an immeasurable depth to the catalogs of both artists".

In JazzTimes Colin Fleming wrote, "this Haden-Hall bass/guitar duet album smacks of affinity, several ways over".

PopMatters correspondent Will Layman said, "Hall and Haden were not only eloquent and influential masters but also musicians who spoke with a quiet assurance. They were revolutionaries who didn’t ruffle feathers, perhaps. It seemed like they’d be around forever, quietly knocking us out. What a gift, then, to find this quiet and loving duet concert from the 1990 Montreal International Jazz Festival pairing Hall and Haden in duets on eight good tunes".

The Absolute Sound's Derk Richardson noted, "These eight songs, preserved in exquisite sonic detail—warm and sculpted from top to bottom, filling up huge but keenly defined aural space— are an unexpected bonanza for lovers of pure melody, improvised harmony, and the radiant sunset tones that these two men perfected on their respective instruments".

In The Irish Times Cormac Larkin observed, "Whether on standards or originals, there is a warmth and an unmistakable sincerity on display that belies the sparse, almost skeletal texture of the music. As the set develops, one can hear these two great artist reaching out, listening to and developing each other’s ideas, clearly revelling in the encounter".

== Track listing ==
1. "Bemsha Swing" (Thelonious Monk, Denzil Best) - 8:32
2. "First Song" (Charlie Haden) - 8:52
3. "Turnaround" (Ornette Coleman) - 9:32
4. "Body and Soul" (Johnny Green, Edward Heyman, Robert Sour) - 11:14
5. "Down from Antigua" (Jim Hall) - 12:04
6. "Skylark" (Hoagy Carmichael, Johnny Mercer) - 9:22
7. "Big Blues" (Hall) - 9:19
8. "In the Moment" (Haden) - 7:04

== Personnel ==
- Charlie Haden — bass
- Jim Hall — guitar
