= Haunted Heart (Charlie Haden album) =

Studio album by Charlie Haden
- Released: July 28, 1992
- Recorded: October 27–28, 1991
- Studio: Studio Plateforme, Sète
- Genre: Jazz
- Length: 66:07
- Label: Verve
- Producer: Charlie Haden, Hans Wendl

Charlie Haden chronology
First Song (1992)	Haunted Heart (1992)	Always Say Goodbye (1994)

Quartet West chronology
In Angel City (1988)	Haunted Heart (1992)	Always Say Goodbye (1994)

Haunted Heart is an album by the American jazz bassist Charlie Haden's Quartet West, recorded in 1991 and released on the Verve label.

== Reception ==
The AllMusic review by Ron Wynn stated, "Quartet West has emerged as a premier small combo, and Haden nicely paid tribute to the past without being held hostage to it".

Professional ratings
Review scores
Source	Rating
AllMusic	4.5/5 stars
The Penguin Guide to Jazz Recordings	3/4 stars

== Track listing ==
1. Introduction (Max Steiner / Adolph Deutsch) - 0:37
2. "Hello My Lovely" (Haden) - 6:47
3. "Haunted Heart" (Howard Dietz, Arthur Schwartz) - 9:12
4. "Dance of the Infidels" (Bud Powell) - 3:50
5. "The Long Goodbye" (Alan Broadbent) - 6:30
6. "Moonlight Serenade" (Glenn Miller, Mitchell Parish) - 9:08
7. "Lennie's Pennies" (Lennie Tristano) - 5:15
8. "Ev'ry Time We Say Goodbye" (Cole Porter) - 4:18
9. "Lady in the Lake" (Broadbent) - 6:09
10. "Segment" (Charlie Parker) - 5:32
11. "The Bad and the Beautiful" (David Raksin) - 5:32
12. "Deep Song" (Douglass Cross, George Cory) - 6:05

== Personnel ==
- Charlie Haden – bass
- Ernie Watts – tenor saxophone
- Alan Broadbent – piano
- Larance Marable – drums
- Jo Stafford – voice (track 3)
- Jeri Southern – voice (track 8)
- Billie Holiday – voice (track 12)
