= Sharon Freeman =

Jazz musician

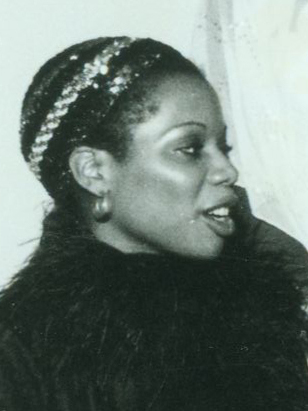

Background information
- Genre: Jazz
- Occupations: Instrumentalist, arranger
- Instruments: Piano, French Horn

Ahnee Sharon Freeman is a jazz pianist, French horn player and arranger.

Freeman played French horn for the jazz opera Escalator over the Hill, Gil Evans's 1973 album Svengali, and in 1983 she worked on a piece of jazz Christmas music. In 1982 she joined Charlie Haden's Liberation Music Orchestra and recorded three albums with the group between 1982 and 2004. Freeman has also worked and recorded with Frank Foster, Charles Mingus, Don Cherry, Muhal Richard Abrams, David Murray, and Lionel Hampton, and served as musical director for Don Pullen and for Beaver Harris' 360 Musical Experience.

Although more documented as a horn player, in 1988 Freeman was a guest as a pianist on Marian McPartland's Piano Jazz radio program on National Public Radio.

Freeman was nominated for a Grammy for her arrangement of "Monk's Mood" for five French horns and rhythm section for Hal Willner's album, That's the Way I Feel Now: A Tribute to Thelonious Monk. She has been commissioned by the Jazz Composer's Orchestra, the Brooklyn Philharmonic, and the Harlem Piano Trio. She has been cited by Jazz Times as the top-rated established jazz French horn player.

== Discography ==
With Carla Bley

- Escalator over the Hill (JCOA, 1968–71)

With Gil Evans

- Svengali (Atlantic, 1973)

With George Gruntz

- First Prize (Enja, 1989)

With Charlie Haden

- The Ballad of the Fallen (ECM, 1982)
- The Montreal Tapes: Liberation Music Orchestra (Verve, 1989 [1999])
- Not in Our Name (Verve, 2004)

With Leroy Jenkins

- For Players Only (JCOA Records, 1975)

With Warren Smith

- Composers Workshop Ensemble (Claves, 1968–82)

With Charles Sullivan

- Genesis (Strata-East, 1974)
