= Silence (Charlie Haden album) =

Studio album by Charlie Haden
- Released: 1989
- Recorded: November 11–12, 1987
- Genre: Jazz
- Length: 44:06
- Label: Soul Note
- Producer: Giovanni Bonandrini

Charlie Haden chronology
Etudes (1988)	Silence (1989)	Dialogues (1990)

Professional ratings
Review scores
Source	Rating
AllMusic	3/5 stars
The Penguin Guide to Jazz Recordings	2/4 stars

Silence is an album by the American jazz bassist Charlie Haden, recorded in 1987 and released on the Italian Soul Note label two years later. The album features West Coast jazz trumpeter Chet Baker, and was recorded six months before Baker's death. Three of the six songs on the album—"My Funny Valentine", "'Round Midnight", and "Conception"—were regular features in Baker's concerts at the time. A fourth song, "Visa", was a bebop composition written by Charlie Parker, a musician Baker played with early in his career. Joining Haden and Baker on the album are drummer Billy Higgins and pianist Enrico Pieranunzi.

The album is similar in musical programming and band format to the series of albums Haden made with his Quartet West group. As with the original Quartet West group, Silence features a jazz quartet anchored by Haden and Higgins. The bassist and drummer worked together sporadically from the late 1950s (when both were members of Ornette Coleman's band) through the 1990s. Silence was recorded between the first and second Quartet West albums. In 1990, the trio of Haden, Higgins and Pieranunzi recorded Haden's First Song album for the same label.

== Track listing ==
All compositions by Charlie Haden except as indicated

1. "Visa" (Charlie Parker) – 5:48
2. "Silence" – 8:45
3. "Echi" (Enrico Pieranunzi) – 6:09
4. "My Funny Valentine" (Lorenz Hart, Richard Rodgers) – 5:39
5. "'Round About Midnight" (Thelonious Monk) – 11:36
6. "Conception" (George Shearing) – 6:00

- Recorded at CMC Studio in Roma, Italy, on November 11 and 12, 1987

== Covers ==
Brazilian synthpop band Metrô covered "Silence" on their 2002 album Déjà-Vu.

== Personnel ==
- Charlie Haden – bass
- Chet Baker – trumpet
- Enrico Pieranunzi – piano
- Billy Higgins – drums
