= Land of the Sun (album) =

Studio album by Charlie Haden
- Released: August 31, 2004
- Recorded: December 19–22, 2003
- Genre: Latin jazz
- Length: 63:08
- Label: Verve
- Producer: Gonzalo Rubalcaba, Ruth Cameron, Charlie Haden

Charlie Haden chronology
Nightfall (2004)	Land of the Sun (2004)	Not in Our Name (2005)

Land of the Sun is an album by American jazz musician Charlie Haden with Cuban pianist Gonzalo Rubalcaba. It presents orchestral Latin dance music from 1940s Mexico, mainly composed by José Sabre Marroquín, which Rubalcaba arranged for an ensemble of ten featuring among others Joe Lovano and Miguel Zenon on saxophone. In 2005, the album won Haden the Grammy Award for Best Latin Jazz Album.

== Reception ==
Professional ratings
Review scores
Source	Rating
AllMusic	4/5 stars
The Penguin Guide to Jazz Recordings	3/4 stars

Music critic Thom Jurek of AllMusic wrote, "Land of the Sun is a deeply romantic album, but it is lush without artificial ornamentation or affectation. Musically, its refinement is such that it begs critical as well as casual listening. Hopefully this won't be the last such exercise from Haden and Rubalcaba, but an introduction."

== Track listing ==
1. "Fuiste Tú (It Was You)" (José Sabre Marroquín, Criz Sabre) – 6:17
2. "Sueño Sólo con Tu Amor (I Only Dream of Your Love)" (Marroquín, Sabre) – 5:08
3. "Canción de Cuna a Patricia (Lullaby for Patricia)" (Marroquín) – 7:00
4. "Solamente una Vez (You Belong to My Heart)" (Agustín Lara) – 8:06
5. "Nostalgia" (Marroquín) – 5:40
6. "De Siempre (Forever)" (Marroquín) – 7:07
7. "Añoranza (Longing)" (Marroquín) – 3:21
8. "Cuando Te Podré Olvidar (When Will I Forget You)" (Marroquín, Sabre) – 4:49
9. "Esta Tarde Vi Llover (Yesterday I Heard the Rain)" (Armando Manzanero) – 6:42
10. "Canción a Paola (Paola's Song)" (Marroquín) – 8:58

== Personnel ==
- Charlie Haden – bass
- Gonzalo Rubalcaba – piano, percussion
- Ignacio Berroa – drums, percussion
- Joe Lovano – tenor saxophone
- Miguel Zenon – alto saxophone
- Michael Rodriquez – trumpet, flugelhorn
- Oriente Lopez – flute
- Larry Koonse – guitar
- Lionel Loueke – guitar
- Juan De La Cruz (Chocolate) – bongo

== Notes ==
Recorded December 19–22, 2003, at Avatar Studios, NYC. Mixed February 22–28, 2004, at Capitol Studios, Los Angeles, California. Mastered April 12, 2004, at the Mastering Lab, Los Angeles, California
