= Jazz Middelheim =

Annual jazz festival in Belgium

- Genre: Jazz
- Location(s): Antwerp, Belgium
- Coordinates: 51°13′N 04°24′E
- Years active: 1969–present
- Website: Official site

Jazz Middelheim is an annual summer jazz festival in Antwerp, Belgium. The first festival took place in 1969 as a jazz promenade in the Middelheim Park.

== 2010 ==
The 2010 edition presented Toots Thielemans, Wayne Shorter, McCoy Tyner, Joe Lovano, Cassandra Wilson, Archie Shepp, Ahmad Jamal, World Saxophone Quartet, Chucho Valdés, Dave Holland, Pepe Habichuela, Josemi Carmona, Jef Neve, José James, Jeroen Van Herzeele, Aka Moon, and Baba Sissoko.
