= None but the Lonely Heart (album) =

None But the Lonely Heart

Studio album by Charlie Haden and Chris Anderson
- Released: July 1998
- Recorded: July 5–6, 1997
- Genre: Jazz
- Length: 78:37
- Label: Naim
- Producer: Charlie Haden

Charlie Haden chronology
Night and the City (1998)	None But the Lonely Heart (1998)	The Montreal Tapes: Liberation Music Orchestra (1999)

None But the Lonely Heart is an album by the pianist Chris Anderson and the bassist Charlie Haden. It was recorded in 1997 and released on the Naim label.

== Reception ==
The AllMusic review by Joel Roberts stated: "Chris Anderson is one of the unsung heroes of modern jazz piano. A revered figure among musicians, largely for his role as mentor to a young Herbie Hancock, Anderson has long been hindered by illness from aggressively pursuing his rightful place in the jazz limelight... One hopes that this outstanding, quietly brilliant duo effort with bass master Haden helps earn him some richly deserved acclaim".

Professional ratings
Review scores
Source	Rating
AllMusic	4.5/5 stars
The Penguin Guide to Jazz Recordings	4/4 stars

== Track listing ==
1. "The Night We Called It a Day" (Tom Adair, Matt Dennis) - 13:19
2. "I Hear a Rhapsody" (George Fragos, Jack Baker, Bard, Dick Gasparre) - 7:04
3. "Alone Together" (Howard Dietz, Arthur Schwartz) - 6:52
4. "Nobody's Heart" (Lorenz Hart, Richard Rodgers) - 10:33
5. "Body and Soul" (Edward Heyman, Robert Sour, Frank Eyton, Johnny Green) - 6:24
6. "The Things We Did Last Summer" (Sammy Cahn, Jule Styne) - 5:26
7. "It Never Entered My Mind" (Lorenz Hart, Richard Rodgers) - 9:04
8. "CC Blues" (Chris Anderson, Charlie Haden) - 5:25
9. "Good Morning Heartache" (Irene Higginbotham, Ervin Drake, Dan Fisher) - 8:30

- Recorded at the CAMI Hall in New York on July 5–7, 1997

== Personnel ==
Musicians

- Charlie Haden – bass
- Chris Anderson – piano

Production

- Charlie Haden – producer
- Paul Stephenson (Naim) – marketing
- Anna Tooth (Naim) – manager, photography
- Ken Christianson – engineer (recording)
- Julian Vereker – engineer (mastering)
