= Gonzalo Rubalcaba =

Afro-Cuban jazz pianist and composer (born 1963)

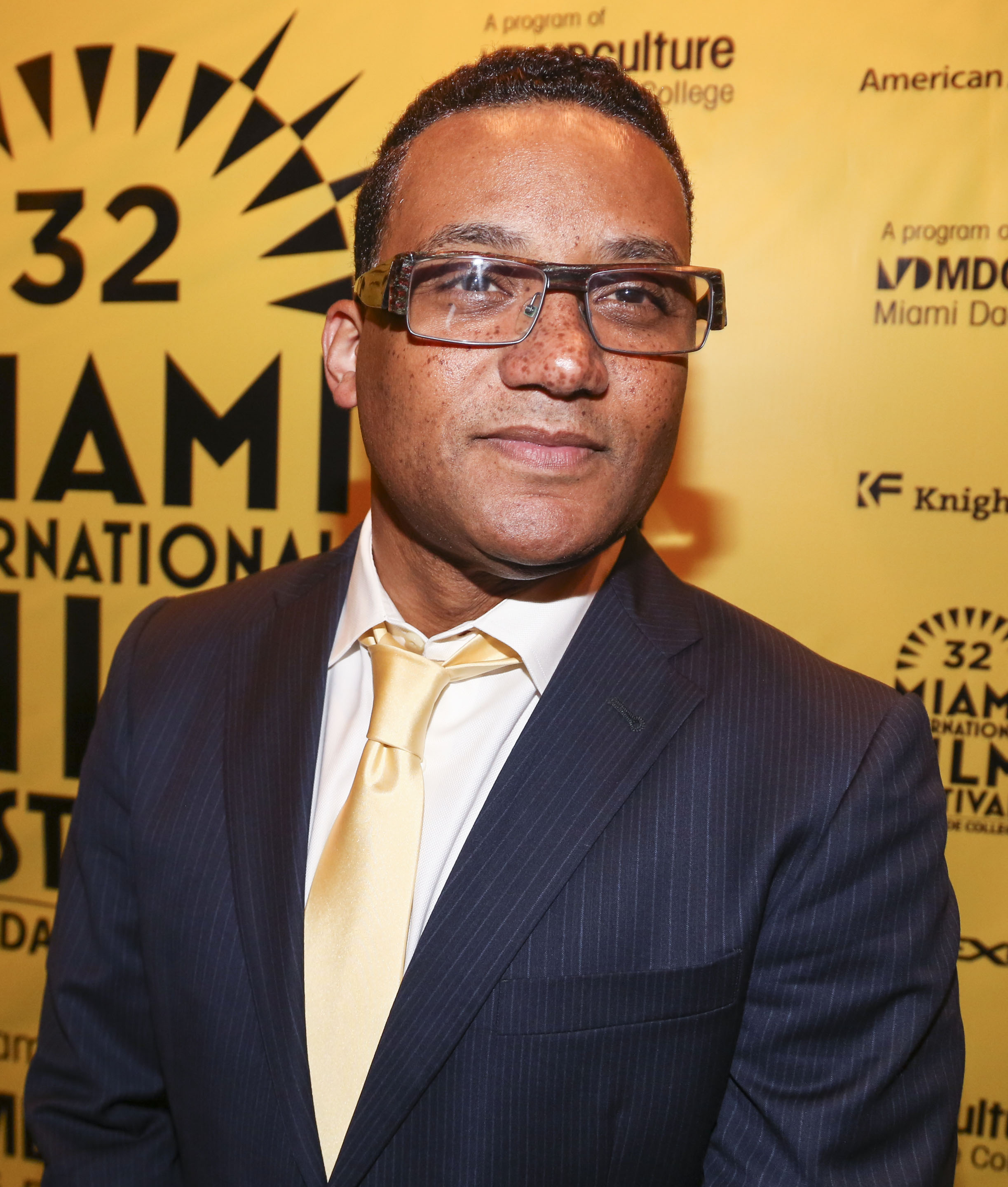
- Rubalcaba at the Miami International Film Festival in 2015

Background information
- Born: May 27, 1963 (age 63); Havana, Cuba
- Genres: Jazz, Latin jazz, Afro-Cuban jazz, jazz fusion, classical
- Occupations: Musician, composer
- Instrument: Piano
- Years active: 1983–present
- Label: 5passion.com
- Website: gonzalorubalcaba.com

Gonzalo Rubalcaba (born May 27, 1963) is a Cuban jazz pianist and composer.

== Early life ==
Rubalcaba was born Gonzalo Julio González Fonseca in Havana, Cuba into a musical family. He adopted his great-grandmother's name for professional use, just as did his father, Guillermo Rubalcaba (born Guillermo González Camejo) and his grandfather, Jacobo Rubalcaba (born Jacobo González Rubalcaba).

== Later life and career ==
With Orquesta Aragón, Rubalcaba toured France and Africa in 1983. He formed his own Grupo Projecto in 1985.

He has won three Grammy Awards and received twelve nominations.

== Discography ==
=== As leader/co-leader ===
- Mi Gran Pasion (Connector/Timba, 1987)
- Live in Havana (Pimienta, 1989)
- Giraldilla (Pimienta, 1990)
- Discovery: Live at Montreux (Blue Note, 1990)
- Gonzalo Rubalcaba Trio at Montreux (Somethin' Else, 1990)
- The Blessing (Blue Note, 1991)
- Images (Blue Note, 1992)
- At Montreux (Artex, 1993)
- Suite 4 Y 20 (Blue Note, 1993)
- Diz (Blue Note, 1993)
- Rapsodia (Blue Note, 1994)
- Imagine: Live in America (Blue Note, 1994)
- Concatenacion (Egrem, 1995)
- Concierto Negro (Egrem, 1995)
- Flying Colors (Blue Note, 1997)
- Romantic (EMI, 1998)
- Gonzalo Rubalcaba (Max, 1998)
- Antiguo (Blue Note, 1998)
- Inner Voyage (Blue Note/EMI, 1999)
- Inicio (Egrem, 2001)
- Supernova (Blue Note, 2001)
- Straight Ahead (Yemaya, 2003)
- Soneros de Verdad Present Rubalcaba Pasado y Presente (Universal Music Latino/Pimienta, 2003)
- Paseo (Blue Note, 2004)
- The Trio (Angel, 2005)
- Solo (Blue Note, 2005)
- Avatar (Angel, 2008)
- Faith (5Passion, 2010)
- XXI Century (5Passion, 2011)
- Live Faith (5Passion, 2014)
- Suite Caminos (5Passion, 2015)
- Tokyo Adagio with Charlie Haden (Impulse!, 2015) - Recorded in 2005
- Charlie (5Passion, 2015)
- Skyline with Ron Carter, Jack DeJohnette (5Passion, 2021)
- Pédron Rubalcaba with Pierrick Pédron (mars 2023)
- Borrowed Roses (Top Stop, 2023)
- A Tribute to Benny Moré and Nat King Cole with Yainer Horta, Joey Calveiro (Calveiro Entertainment, 2025)

=== As sideman ===
With Ignacio Berroa

- Codes (Blue Note, 2006)

With Ron Carter

- Mr. Bow-tie (Somethin' Else, 1995)

With Juan Luis Guerra

- Bachata Rosa (Karen, 1990)

With Francisco Céspedes

- Con el Permiso de Bola (Warner Music Mexico, 2006)

With Chick Corea

- Rendezvous in New York (Stretch, 2003)

With Dave Holland

- The Monterey Quartet: Live at the 2007 Monterey Jazz Festival (Monterey Jazz Festival, 2009)

With Al Di Meola

- Pursuit of Radical Rhapsody (Concord, 2011)
- Flesh on Flesh (Telarc, 2022)

With Richard Galliano

- Love Day (Milan, 2008)

With Charlie Haden

- 1989: The Montreal Tapes: with Gonzalo Rubalcaba and Paul Motian (Verve, 1997)
- 2000: Nocturne (Verve, 2001)
- 2003: Land of the Sun (Verve, 2004)
- 2005: Tokyo Adagio (Impulse!, 2015) – live at The Blue Note, Tokyo, Japan

With Katia Labèque

- Shape of My Heart (KML, 2009)

With Tony Martinez

- Habana Vive
- Mafarefun

With Pat Martino

- Think Tank

With Strat Andriotis

- Night Manager (2018) Song 21

With Melissa Aldana

- Filin (Blue Note, 2026)

== Awards ==
=== Grammy Awards ===
Year	Nominee / work	Award	Result
1995	Rapsodia	Best Jazz Instrumental Performance, Individual or Group	Nominated
1997	"Agua de Beber"	Best Jazz Instrumental Solo	Nominated
2000	Antiguo	Best Latin Jazz Album	Nominated
2002	Supernova	Best Latin Jazz Album	Nominated
2002	Nocturne (as producer)	Best Latin Jazz Album	Won
2002	"Oren"	Best Instrumental Composition	Nominated
2005	Land of the Sun (as producer)	Best Latin Jazz Album	Won
2016	Suite Caminos	Best Latin Jazz Album	Nominated
2021	Viento y Tiempo - Live at Blue Note Tokyo	Best Latin Jazz Album	Nominated
2022	Skyline	Best Jazz Instrumental Album	Won
2026	A Tribute to Benny Moré and Nat King Cole	Best Latin Jazz Album	Won

=== Billboard Music Awards ===
Year	Nominee / work	Award	Result
2002	Supernova	Latin Jazz Album of the Year	Nominated
2007	Solo	Latin Jazz Album of the Year	Nominated

=== Latin Grammy Awards ===
Year	Nominee / work	Award	Result
2002	Supernova	Best Latin Jazz Album	Won
2005	Paseo	Best Instrumental Album	Nominated
2006	Solo	Best Latin Jazz Album	Won
2008	Avatar	Best Instrumental Album	Nominated
2022	Live in Marciac	Best Tropical Traditional Album	Won
