= Nocturne (Charlie Haden album) =

2001 studio album by Charlie Haden

Studio album by Charlie Haden and Gonzalo Rubalcaba
- Released: April 17, 2001
- Recorded: August 27–31, 2000
- Studio: Criteria / The Hit Factory, Miami, Florida
- Genre: Jazz, Latin jazz
- Label: Verve
- Producer: Charlie Haden, Gonzalo Rubalcaba

Charlie Haden and Gonzalo Rubalcaba chronology
The Art of the Song (1999)	Nocturne (2001)	In Montreal (2001)

Nocturne is an album by jazz musician Charlie Haden and Gonzalo Rubalcaba, released through Universal/Polygram in 2001. In 2002, the album won Haden the Grammy Award for Best Latin Jazz Album.

== Reception ==
Professional ratings
Review scores
Source	Rating
AllMusic	2/5 stars
The Penguin Guide to Jazz Recordings	3/4 stars

Music critic David R. Alder of AllMusic called the album a "melancholy, soothing album", but also wrote that "the unvaryingly straightforward arrangements fade too easily into the background. Nocturne may well be the best candlelight dinner music ever, but Haden and his guests are capable of more."

== Track listing ==
1. "En la Orilla del Mundo (At the Edge of the World)" (Martín Rojas) – 5:14
2. "Noche de Ronda (Night of Wandering)" (María Teresa Lara) – 5:43
3. "Nocturnal" (José Saber Marroquín, José Mojica) – 6:56
4. "Moonlight (Claro de Luna)" (Haden) – 5:37
5. "Yo Sin Ti (Me Without You)" (Arturo Castro) – 6:02
6. "No Te Empeñes Mas (Don't Try Anymore)" (Marta Valdés) – 5:30
7. "Transparence" (Gonzalo Rubalcaba) – 6:11
8. "El Ciego (The Blind)" (Armando Manzanero) – 5:58
9. "Nightfall" (Haden) – 6:40
10. "Tres Palabras (Three Words)" (Osvaldo Farrés) – 6:18
11. "Contigo en la Distancia/En Nosotros (With You in the Distance/In Us)" (Cesar Portillo De La Luz, Tania Castellanos) – 6:33

== Personnel ==
- Charlie Haden - acoustic bass
- Gonzalo Rubalcaba - piano
- Ignacio Berroa - drums
- Joe Lovano - tenor saxophone (tracks 1,4,7 & 11)
- David Sanchez - tenor saxophone (tracks 6 & 10)
- Pat Metheny - acoustic guitar (track 2)
- Federico Britos Ruiz - violin (tracks 1,5 & 8)
