= Jazz Review =

Scottish jazz magazine (1998–2009)

- Editor: Richard Cook (1998–2007)
- Categories: Music magazine
- Frequency: Monthly (1998–2005); Bimonthly (2005–2009)
- Founder: Richard Cook and Roger Spence
- Founded: 1998
- Final issue: c. April 2009
- Company: Direct Music Limited
- Country: Scotland
- Based in: Edinburgh, Scotland
- Language: English

Jazz Review was a Scottish jazz magazine, founded in 1998. The founders were jazz writer (and former editor of The Wire) Richard Cook and Roger Spence of the talent management agency Direct Music Limited of Edinburgh, Scotland. Jazz Review covered the entire range of jazz history from early jazz through swing to bebop, modern jazz and the avant-garde, and was known for its scholarly approach and independent stance. Major artists — including Keith Jarrett, Lee Konitz, Ornette Coleman, Dave Brubeck, and Wynton Marsalis — gave interviews to the magazine; historical surveys included the Modern Jazz Quartet, Fletcher Henderson, Oscar Peterson, and Andrew Hill. The magazine was also renowned for its coverage of British jazz.

Contributors included Simon Adams, Ronald Atkins, Emma Baker, Garry Booth, Philip Clark, Jack Cooke, Tim Dorset, Rick Finlay, Mike Fish, Derek Gorman, Fred Grand, Hugh Gregory, Andy Hamilton, Martin Longley, Alan Luff, Chris Parker, Catherine Parsonage, Mike Rogers, Bill Shoemaker, Roger Thomas, Anthony Troon, Jim Weir, and Barry Witherden.

Alongside interviews and articles, regular features included "Posted Notes" (reader's letters), "Now's The Time" (a musician diary piece), "ANEC-Dotage" (Alan Luff remembers...), "The Test" (a musician is given records to comment on without knowing what they are), CD reviews, "Fast Taste" (shorter reviews) and "Yesterdays" (a prominent musician writes about a major turning point in his or her career).

== History ==
Richard Cook's death in 2007 led to the magazine running without an editor for six months until 2008, when Brian Morton was appointed editor and Philip Clark was made reviews editor. Mark Gilbert, formerly deputy editor of the magazine, soon took over from Morton, and was the last editor.

The magazine went bi-monthly in 2005. A rival monthly publication, Jazz Journal International, was presumed to have ceased publication in January 2009, after the death of its associate editor, but its holding company, which changed ownership, absorbed Jazz Review around April 2009. It was revived as Jazz Journal at the end of April. Direct Music was no longer involved in the publication.
