= Charlie Haden =

American musician and educator (1937–2014)

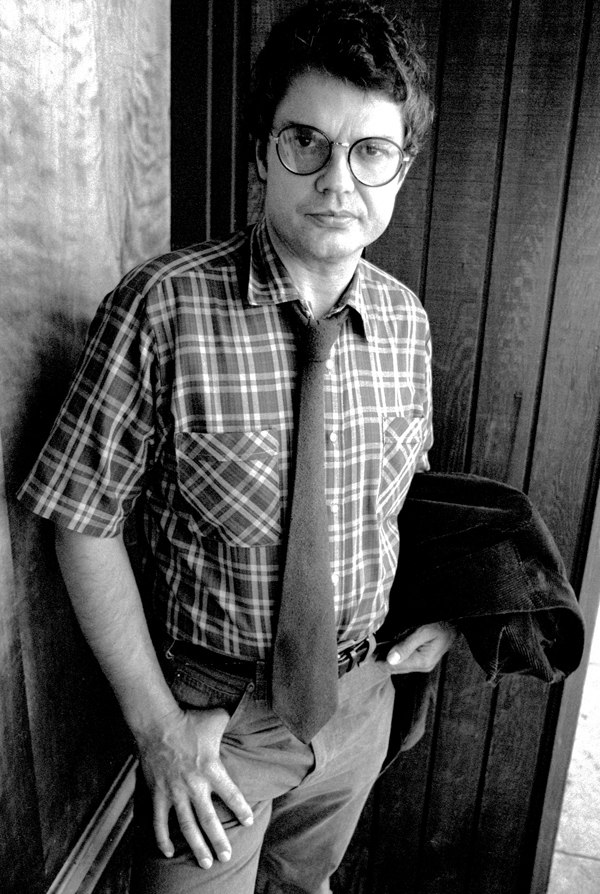
- Haden in 1981

Background information
- Born: Charles Edward Haden; August 6, 1937; Shenandoah, Iowa, U.S.
- Died: July 11, 2014 (aged 76) Los Angeles, California, U.S.
- Genres: Free jazz; mainstream jazz; post-bop; hard bop; folk jazz
- Occupations: Musician, composer, bandleader, educator
- Instrument: Double bass
- Years active: 1957–2014
- Formerly of: Ornette Coleman; Keith Jarrett; Pat Metheny; Hank Jones; Paul Motian; Gonzalo Rubalcaba; Alice Coltrane; John McLaughlin; Jim Hall; Carla Bley; Egberto Gismonti; Dewey Redman
- Spouse: Ellen David (m. 1966; div. 1976) Ruth Cameron (m. 1984)
- Children: Josh; Petra; Tanya; Rachel

Charles Edward Haden (August 6, 1937 – July 11, 2014) was an American jazz double bass player, bandleader, composer and educator whose career spanned more than fifty years. Haden helped to revolutionize the harmonic concept of bass playing in jazz, evolving a style that sometimes complemented the soloist, and other times moved independently, liberating bassists from a strictly accompanying role.

In the late 1950s, he was an original member of the ground-breaking Ornette Coleman Quartet. In 1969, he formed his first band, the Liberation Music Orchestra, featuring arrangements by the pianist Carla Bley. In the late 1960s, he became a member of the pianist Keith Jarrett's trio, quartet and quintet. In the 1980s, he formed his own band, Quartet West. Haden also often recorded and performed in a duo setting, with musicians including the guitarist Pat Metheny and the pianists Hank Jones and Kenny Barron.

The German musicologist Joachim-Ernst Berendt wrote that Haden's "ability to create serendipitous harmonies by improvising melodic responses to Ornette Coleman's free jazz solos (rather than sticking to predetermined harmonies) was both radical and mesmerizing. His virtuosity lies (...) in an incredible ability to make the double bass 'sound out.' Haden cultivated the instrument's gravity as no one else in jazz. He is a master of simplicity, which is one of the most difficult things to achieve."

== Biography ==
=== Early life ===
Haden was born in Shenandoah, Iowa, on August 6, 1937. His family was exceptionally musical and performed on KMA radio as the Haden Family, playing country music and American folk songs. Haden made his professional debut as a singer on the Haden Family's radio show when he was just two years old. He continued singing with his family until he was fifteen, when he contracted bulbar polio. At the age of fourteen, Haden had become interested in jazz after hearing Charlie Parker and Stan Kenton in concert. Once he recovered from polio, Haden began in earnest to concentrate on playing the bass. Haden's interest in the instrument was not sparked by jazz, but the music of Johann Sebastian Bach. Haden soon set his sights on moving to Los Angeles to pursue his dream of becoming a jazz musician; to save money for the trip, he took a job as house bassist for the American Broadcasting Company TV show Ozark Jubilee in Springfield, Missouri.

=== Early career ===
Haden often said that he moved to Los Angeles in 1957 in search of pianist Hampton Hawes. He turned down a full scholarship at Oberlin College, which did not have an established jazz program at the time, to attend Westlake College of Music in Los Angeles. His first recordings were made that year with Paul Bley, with whom he worked until 1959. He also played with Art Pepper for four weeks in 1957, and with Hawes from 1958 to 1959. For a time, Haden shared an apartment with bassist Scott LaFaro.

In May 1959, Haden recorded The Shape of Jazz to Come with Ornette Coleman. Haden's folk-influenced style complemented Coleman's Texas blues elements. Later that year, the Ornette Coleman Quartet moved to New York City and secured a six-week residency at the Five Spot Café. Ornette's quartet played everything by ear, as Haden explained: "At first when we were playing and improvising, we kind of followed the pattern of the song, sometimes. Then, when we got to New York, Ornette wasn't playing on the song patterns, like the bridge and the interlude and stuff like that. He would just play. And that's when I started just following him and playing the chord changes that he was playing: on-the-spot new chord structures made up according to how he felt at any given moment."

In 1960, drug problems caused Haden to leave Coleman's quartet. He went to rehab in September 1963 at Synanon houses in Santa Monica and San Francisco, during which time he met his first wife, Ellen David. They moved to New York City's Upper West Side, where their four children were born: their son, Josh, in 1968, and in 1971, their triplet daughters Petra, Rachel, and Tanya. They separated in 1975 and subsequently divorced.

=== 1964 to 1969 ===
Haden resumed his career in 1964, working with saxophonist John Handy and pianist Denny Zeitlin, and performing with Archie Shepp in California and Europe. He also did freelance work from 1966 to 1967, playing with Henry "Red" Allen, Pee Wee Russell, Attila Zoller, Bobby Timmons, Tony Scott, and the Thad Jones/Mel Lewis Orchestra. He recorded with Roswell Rudd in 1966, and returned to Coleman's group in 1967. This group remained active until the early 1970s. Haden was known for being able to skillfully follow the shifting directions and modulations of Ornette's improvised lines.

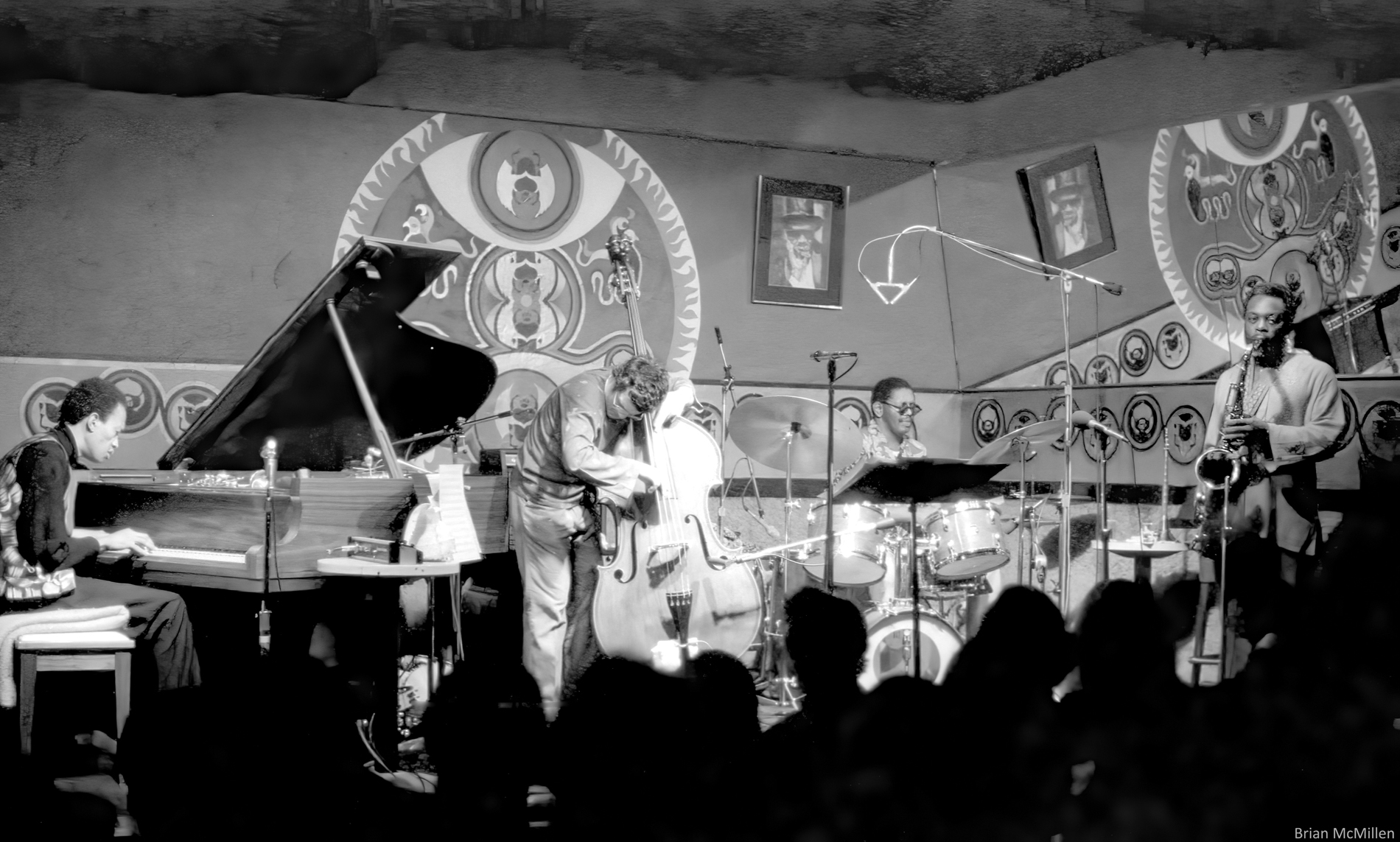
Old and New Dreams 1978

Haden became a member of Keith Jarrett's trio and his 'American Quartet' from 1967 to 1976 with drummer Paul Motian and saxophonist Dewey Redman. The group also included percussionist Guilherme Franco. He also organized the collective Old and New Dreams, which consisted of Don Cherry, Redman, and Ed Blackwell, who had also been members of Coleman's band. They continued to play Coleman's music in addition to original compositions in a style informed by Coleman.

=== Liberation Music Orchestra ===
In 1970 Haden received a Guggenheim Fellowship on the recommendation of Leonard Bernstein. Over the years, Haden received several NEA grants for composition. Haden founded his first band, the Liberation Music Orchestra ("LMO") in 1969, working with arranger Carla Bley. Their music was very experimental, exploring both the realms of free jazz and political music. The first album focused specifically on music from the Spanish Civil War, which had markedly inspired Haden. Inspired by the turbulent 1968 Democratic National Convention in Chicago, he superimposed songs such as "You're a Grand Old Flag" and "Happy Days are Here Again", contrasted with "We Shall Overcome".

The original Liberation Music Orchestra lineup consisted of Haden, Bley, Gato Barbieri, Redman, Motian, Don Cherry, Andrew Cyrille, Mike Mantler, Roswell Rudd, Bob Northern, Howard Johnson, Perry Robinson, and Sam Brown.

Over the years, the LMO had a shifting membership comprising a "who's who" of jazz instrumentalists, and consisted of twelve members from multicultural backgrounds. Its members also included Ahnee Sharon Freeman and Vincent Chancey (French horn), Tony Malaby (tenor saxophonist) Joseph Daley (tuba), Seneca Black (trumpet), Michael Rodriguez (trumpet), Miguel Zenón (alto saxophone), Chris Cheek (tenor saxophone), Curtis Fowlkes (trombone), Steve Cardenas (guitar), and Matt Wilson (drums). Through Bley's arranging, they employed not only more common trombone, trumpet and reeds but included the tuba and French horn. The group won multiple awards in 1970, including France's Grand Prix du Disque from the Académie Charles Cros, and Japan's Gold Disc Award from Swing Journal.

While on tour with the Ornette Coleman Quartet in Portugal in 1971, Haden dedicated a performance of his "Song for Ché" to anti-colonial resistance movements in the Portuguese colonies of Mozambique, Angola, and Guinea. The following day, he was detained at Lisbon Airport, jailed, and interrogated by the DGS, the Portuguese secret police. He was released only after Coleman and others complained to the American cultural attaché; Haden was later interviewed by the FBI about the dedication. A mono recording of Haden's dedication and the audience's applause is included at the beginning of "For A Free Portugal" on the album Closeness. It was released in 1976, two years after the Carnation Revolution.

Haden decided to form the LMO at the height of the Vietnam War, out of his frustration that so much of the government's energy was spent on the war in lieu of internal problems. Haden's goal was to use the LMO to amplify unheard voices of oppressed peoples and express solidarity with progressive political movements from around the world. The LMO's 1982 album The Ballad of the Fallen on ECM commented again on the Spanish Civil War as well as United States involvement in Latin America. The LMO toured extensively throughout the 1980s and 1990s. In 1990, the orchestra returned with Dream Keeper, inspired by a poem by Langston Hughes, which also drew on American gospel music and South African music to comment on racism in the United States and apartheid in South Africa. The album featured choral contributions from the Oakland Youth Chorus. In 2005, Haden released the fourth Liberation Music Orchestra album, Not in Our Name, a protest against the Iraq War.

=== 1982–2000 ===
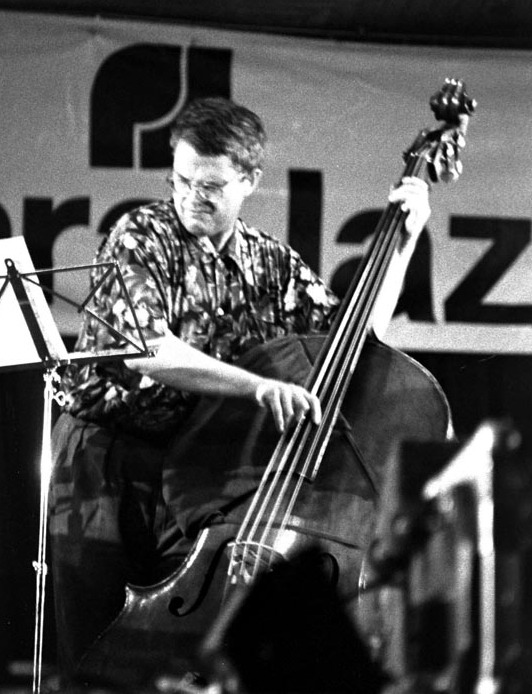
Haden in 1990

In 1982, Haden established the Jazz Studies Program at California Institute of the Arts in Valencia, Santa Clarita. His program emphasized smaller group performance and the spiritual connection to the creative process. He encouraged students to discover their individual sounds, melodies, and harmonies. Haden was honored by the Los Angeles Jazz Society as "Jazz Educator of the Year" for his educational work in this program. Haden's students included John Coltrane's son, tenor saxophonist Ravi Coltrane, trumpeter Ralph Alessi, pianist and composer James Carney and bassist Scott Colley.

In 1984, Haden met the singer and actress Ruth Cameron. They married in New York City, and throughout their marriage, Ruth managed Haden's career as well as co-produced many albums and projects with him.

In 1986, Haden formed his band Quartet West at Ruth's suggestion. The original quartet consisted of Ernie Watts on sax, Alan Broadbent on piano, and long-time collaborator Billy Higgins on drums. Higgins was later replaced by Larance Marable. When Marable became too ill to perform, drummer Rodney Green was added to the band. In addition to original compositions by Haden and Broadbent, their repertoire also included 1940s pop ballads which they played in a noir-infused, bop-oriented style. A brief collaboration with tenor saxophonist Joe Henderson and drummer Al Foster showcased Haden's playing in a more hard-driving jazz context.

In 1989, Haden inaugurated the "Invitation" series at the Montreal Jazz Festival. With different musicians he selected, they performed in concert for eight consecutive nights of the festival. Each of these events was recorded, and most have been released in the series, The Montreal Tapes.

In 1994, Ginger Baker, drummer from the band Cream, formed another trio called The Ginger Baker Trio with Haden and guitarist Bill Frisell.

Duets: Haden loved the intimacy the duet format provided. In 1995, Haden released Steal Away: Spirituals, Hymns and Folk Songs with pianist Hank Jones, an album based on traditional spirituals and folk songs. Haden both played on and produced the album. In late 1996, he collaborated with guitarist Pat Metheny on the album Beyond the Missouri Sky (Short Stories), exploring the music that influenced them in their childhood experiences in, respectively southwest Iowa and northwest Missouri, with what Haden called "contemporary impressionistic Americana". Haden was awarded his first Grammy Award for the album, for Best Jazz Instrumental Performance.

In 1997, classical composer Gavin Bryars wrote By the Vaar, an extended adagio for Haden. Instrumentation included strings, bass clarinet, and percussion. The piece was recorded with the English Chamber Orchestra, on the album Farewell to Philosophy. It is a synthesis of jazz and classical chamber music, featuring resonant pizzicato notes and gut strings in imitation of Haden's bass sound.

=== 2000–2014 ===
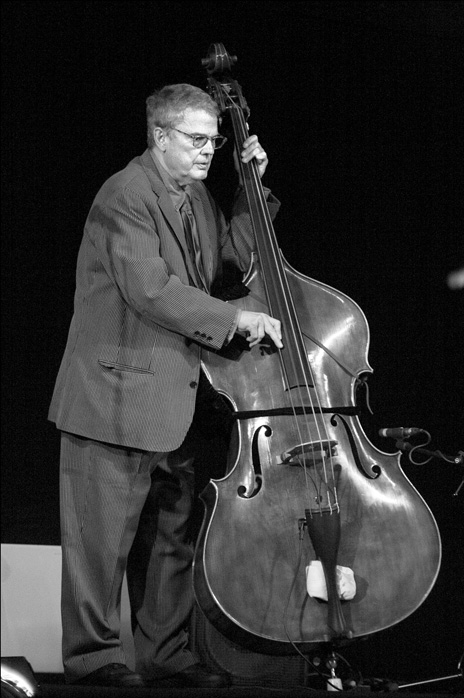
Haden in 2007

In 2001, Haden won the Latin Grammy Award for Best Latin Jazz CD for his album Nocturne which contains boleros from Cuba and Mexico. In 2003, he won the Latin Grammy Award for Best Latin Jazz Performance for his album Land of the Sun. Haden reconvened the Liberation Music Orchestra in 2005, with largely new members, for the album Not In Our Name, released on Verve Records. The album dealt primarily with the contemporary political situation in the United States.

In 2008, Haden co-produced, with his wife Ruth Cameron Haden, the album Rambling Boy. It features several members of his immediate family, including Ruth Cameron, his musician triplets, son Josh, and Tanya's husband, singer and multi-instrumentalist Jack Black. They were joined by banjoist Béla Fleck, and guitarist/singers Vince Gill, Pat Metheny, Elvis Costello, Rosanne Cash, Bruce Hornsby (piano and keyboards), among other top Nashville musicians. The album harkens back to Haden's days of playing Americana and bluegrass music with his parents on their radio show. The idea came to Haden when his wife Ruth gathered the Haden family together for his mother's 80th birthday and suggested they all sing "You Are My Sunshine" in the living room, as that was a song everyone knew. Rambling Boy was intended to connect music from his early childhood in the Haden Family band to the new generation of the Haden family as well. The album includes songs made famous by the Stanley Brothers, the Carter Family, and Hank Williams, in addition to traditional songs and original compositions.

In 2009, Swiss film director Reto Caduff released a film about Haden's life, titled Rambling Boy. It screened at the Telluride Film Festival and at the Vancouver International Film Festival in 2009. In the summer of 2009, Haden performed again with Coleman at the Meltdown Festival in Southbank, London. He also performed and produced duet recordings with pianist Kenny Barron, with whom he recorded the album Night and the City. In February 2010, Haden and pianist Hank Jones recorded a companion to Steal Away: Spirituals, Hymns and Folk Songs called Come Sunday. Jones died three months after the recording of the album.

In September 2014, three months after his death, the newly reactivated Impulse! label released Charlie Haden-Jim Hall, a recording of a duo performance at the 1990 Montreal International Jazz Festival. "This album documents a rarified journey", wrote pianist Ethan Iverson in the album's liner notes. Although terminally ill, Haden produced and worked on the album. In June 2015, Impulse released Tokyo Adagio, a 2005 collaboration with Gonzalo Rubalcaba, similarly produced by Haden when he was near death.

== Awards ==
In 2012, Haden was a recipient of the NEA Jazz Masters Award.

In 2013, Haden received the Grammy Lifetime Achievement Award.

In 2014, Haden was bestowed the Chevalier de l'Ordre des Arts et des Lettres by the French Ministry of Culture. A posthumous ceremony in his honor took place in New York City in 2015, where his widow, Ruth, was presented with the medal.

== Legacy ==
=== Spirituality and teaching method ===
While he did not identify himself with a specific religious orientation, Haden was interested in spirituality, especially in association with music. He felt it was his duty, and the duty of the artist, to bring beauty to the world, to make this world a better place. He encouraged his students to find their own unique musical voice and bring it to their instrument. He also encouraged his students to be in the present moment: "there's no yesterday or tomorrow, there's only right now", he explained. In order to find this state, and ultimately to find one's spiritual self, Haden urged one to aspire to have humility, and respect for beauty; to be thankful for the ability to make music, and to give back to the world with the music they create. He claimed that music taught him this process of exchange, so he taught it to his students in return. Music, Haden believed, also teaches incredibly valuable lessons about life: "I learned at a very young age that music teaches you about life. When you're in the midst of improvisation, there is no yesterday and no tomorrow—there is just the moment that you are in. In that beautiful moment, you experience your true insignificance to the rest of the universe. It is then, and only then, that you can experience your true significance."

=== Musical philosophy ===
Haden also viewed jazz as the "music of rebellion" and felt it was his responsibility and mission to challenge the world through music, and through artistic risks that expressed his own individual artistic vision. He believed that all music originates from the same place, and because of this, he resisted the tendency to divide music into categories. He was democratic in his tastes and musical partners, and was interested in musical collaboration with individuals who shared his sensibilities in music and life. His music (specifically the music he created with the LMO), was based on the music of peoples struggling for freedom from oppression. Haden spoke to this in reference to his 2002 album American Dreams, stating: "I always dreamed of a world without cruelty and greed, of a humanity with the same creative brilliance of our solar system, of an America worthy of the dreams of Martin Luther King, and the majesty of the Statue of Liberty...This music is dedicated to those who still dream of a society with compassion, deep creative intelligence, and a respect for the preciousness of life—for our children, and for our future."

=== Musical style ===
In addition to his lyrical playing, Haden was known for his warm tone and subtle vibrato on the double bass. His approach to the bass stemmed from his belief that the bassist should move from an accompanying role to a more direct role in group improvisation. This is particularly clear in his work with the Ornette Coleman Quartet where he frequently improvised melodic responses to Coleman's free-form solos instead of playing previously written lines. He frequently closed his eyes while performing, and assumed a posture in which he bent himself around the bass until his head was almost at the bottom of the bridge of the bass.

In an interview with Haden, pianist Ethan Iverson noted that Haden's "combination of folk song, avant-garde sensibility, and Bach-like classical harmony is a stream in this music just as distinctive as Thelonious Monk or Elvin Jones."

Haden owned one three-quarters-sized bass, and one seven-eighths-sized bass. The larger bass was one of a small number of basses made by Jean-Baptiste Vuillaume in the nineteenth century. He greatly valued this bass, playing it only at recording sessions and jobs in close proximity to his home so as not to risk damaging it in transit. He attributed the bass's special and valuable nature to the varnish used by Vuillaume.

Haden suffered from tinnitus and hyperacusis. As a result, when he played with a drummer, he had to play behind a Plexiglass divider.

Keith Jarrett said of Haden's way of playing, "He wanted to relate to the material in a very personal style all the time. He wasn't somebody to get into a groove and just enjoy it simply because it was a groove".

== Personal life ==
Haden's son Josh Haden is a bass guitarist and singer in the group Spain. Haden's three daughters, triplets Petra, Tanya and Rachel, were born on October 11, 1971, and are all singers and instrumentalists. All four children come from a previous relationship with Ellen David. Petra plays the violin, Rachel plays the piano and bass guitar, and Tanya, a visual artist, plays the cello. They have a band called The Haden Triplets and recorded their self-titled album in 2012. Comedian, actor, and musician Jack Black is Haden's son-in-law via Tanya.

=== Death ===
Haden died in Los Angeles on July 11, 2014, at the age of 76. He had been suffering from post-polio syndrome and complications from liver disease. A memorial concert was held at New York City's Town Hall on January 13, 2015, produced and organized by his wife Ruth.

== Discography ==
- 1976: Closeness (1976)
- 1976: The Golden Number (1977)
- 1976: As Long as There's Music (1978)
- 1978: Gitane (1979)
- 1979: Mágico (1980)
- 1979: Folk Songs (1981)
- 1987: Etudes (1989)
- 1987: Silence (1987)
- 1990: Dialogues (1990)
- 1991: Haunted Heart (1992)
- 1990: First Song (1992)
- 1994: Steal Away (1995)
- 1996: Beyond the Missouri Sky (Short Stories) (1997)
- 1997: None But the Lonely Heart (1997)
- 2000: Nocturne (2001)
- 2002: American Dreams (2002)
- 2003: Land of the Sun (2004)
- 2005: Tokyo Adagio (2015)
- 2006: Heartplay (2006)
- 2008: Charlie Haden Family & Friends: Rambling Boy (2008)
- 2010: Come Sunday (2012)
