= Ray Santisi =

American jazz pianist, composer, arranger, recording artist and educator

- Born: Ray Santisi; 1 February 1933
- Died: 28 October 2014 (aged 81)
- Occupations: Jazz pianist, composer, arranger, recording artist and educator
- Instrument: Pianist
- Years active: 1957–2014

Ray Santisi (1 February 1933 – 28 October 2014) was an American jazz pianist, composer, arranger, recording artist and educator.

Santisi has played as a featured soloist with Charlie Parker, Stan Getz, Dexter Gordon, Mel Torme, Irene Kral, Herb Pomeroy and Natalie Cole. He has also performed with Buddy DeFranco, Joe Williams, Gabor Szabo, Milt Jackson, Zoot Sims & Al Cohn, Carole Sloane, Clark Terry and Bob Brookmeyer.

== Career ==
Santisi created his own ensemble, The Real Thing

In the 1960s, he performed with the Benny Golson Quartet. He has performed at Carnegie Hall and Boston's Symphony Hall.

Santisi was professor of piano and harmony at Berklee College of Music in Boston where he taught from 1957 until his death in 2014. He won an honors scholarship to Schillinger House. He was awarded grants from the National Endowment for the Arts in composition and performance. He taught at Stan Kenton's summer jazz clinics throughout the US, performing in Europe and Asia. Santisi performed at the first Jazz Workshop, the jazz room of Stables nightclub. In 2008 he was nominated to IAJE Jazz Education Hall of Fame.

Many of his former students have since become jazz musicians; these include Diana Krall, Makoto Ozone, Joe Zawinul, Keith Jarrett, Jane Ira Bloom, Jan Hammer, Alan Broadbent, Arif Mardin, Gary Burton, John Hicks, Danilo Perez, Hiromi and Mikolai Stroinski. Fourteen of his former students have received Grammy awards.

Santisi authored Berklee Jazz Piano (published by Berklee Press in 2009, distributed by Hal Leonard), available at Amazon.com, and his instructional book, Jazz Originals for Piano,

Santisi's trio played the first Sunday of each month for eleven years at Ryles Jazz Club until the month of his death, showcasing standards of Tin Pan Alley and Harlem renaissance.

Compositions with BMI #

Pendulums,1162959, inspired by the famous "Jitterbug Waltz" of Fats Waller.

Less Talk, 850876

Like Blues, 871895

Little Sue, 883296

Minstrel Eyes, 994378

Moon Mist, 1007633

Mose Knows, 1013249

Perrys Parasol, 1167560

Sam Speaks, 1285483

Sapphire, 1289924

Take Two, 1452520

Theme For John, 1484664

Santisi has recorded on Blue Note Records, Capitol Records, Prestige Records, Sonnet Records, Roulette Records, and United Artists Records labels. He has also recorded on Bethlehem, Transition and Rasan record labels (see Discography below).

Santisi graduated from Berklee College of Music in 1954 and earned his masters from Boston Conservatory in 1956.

REVIEWS "The most exciting piano player I've heard since those first sessions with Bill Evans, Marian McPartland and Oscar Peterson". Raleigh, N.C. News and Observer.

“As anyone familiar with the Boston scene knows, there are few things finer than hearing Ray take on an acoustic piano. This night, he decided to put on a clinic. It was a master indulging in the sheer joy of tackling the possibilities (maybe the impossibilities) of the instrument.” Stu Vandermark, CADENCE Magazine

== Discography ==
With Boots Mussulli, Max Bennett (b) and Shelly Manne (d)

- Boston Blow-Up, (Capitol Records, 1955 and reissued 2001 by Toshiba EMI, Japan

With Serge Chaloff (bs), Boots Mussulli (as), Herb Pomeroy (tp), Everett Evans (b) and Jimmy Zitano (d)

- Byrd Blows on Beacon Hill (Transition, 1956 and reissued 2001 by Toshiba EMI, Japan

With Donald Byrd, Doug Watkins (b) and Jimmy Zitano (d)

With Herb Pomeroy

- Life Is a Many Splendored Gig (Roulette, 1957)
- The Band and I (United Artists, 1958) with Irene Kral
- Borinquin, (Sonnet Records, 1975)

With Buddy DeFranco (clarinet) and John Chiodini (guitar)

- Spellbinder (Ray Santisi album) (Rasan Records,1990)

With Whit Brown (b) and Fred Buda (ds/perc)

- The Transition Sessions (Blue Note, 2002)

With Donald Byrd, Doug Watkins, Jimmy Zitano, Joe Gordon, Kenny Burrell, Hank Mobley, Duke Jordan, Horace Silver, Art Taylor and Art Blakey

- Dick Wetmore (Bethlehem Records)

With Bill Nordstrom (b) and Jimmy Zitano (dr)

- Meet Me In The city (1620 Jazz Records, 2004)

With Johnny Sousa, Barry Smith and Gene Roma

- Live @Ryles Jazz Club, (Independent, 2005)

With Patricia Adams, Dave Zox, Gary Johnson

- Symbio Obbligato (Independent 2011)

With Patricia Adams, Dave Zox, Gary Johnson

- Live @Ryles Jazz Club, Set 2 (Independent, 2005)

With Patricia Adams, Marshall Wood, Bob Moses

- Live @Ryles Jazz Club, Set 3 (Independent, 2005)

With Marshall Wood, Bob Moses

== Tributes ==
- Boston Jazz Scene History - Jazz Journal 2014
- The Last Of The Stablemates by Rick Vacca
