= Up the Ridge =

- Directed by: Nick Szuberla
- Produced by: Amelia Kirby, Nick Szuberla
- Edited by: Anne Lewis
- Music by: Dirk Powell, Danja Mowf
- Distributed by: Appalshop
- Release date: 2006
- Country: United States
- Language: English

Up the Ridge is a 2006 documentary film by Appalshop filmmakers Nick Szuberla and Amelia Kirby revealing injustices in the American prison system. It especially highlights prisoners sent from urban areas to be incarcerated in rural supermax prisons, such as Red Onion State Prison and Wallens Ridge State Prison. The film delves into issues of parole reform, prisoner abuse, and prisoner suicide. Up the Ridge was created as a part of the Thousand Kites project, a nonprofit organization aimed at exacting prison reform through narrative means. (Kite is prison slang for sending a message)

In 1998, Szuberla was a volunteer DJ for a hip-hop show "Lights Out" on WMMT, an Appalachian region radio station when he received hundreds of letters from inmates transferred into nearby Wallens Ridge State Prison, the region's newest prison, built to prop up the shrinking coal economy. The letters described human rights violations and racial tension between prisoner staff and inmates. Filming began that year. Through the example of Wallens Ridge State Prison, the documentary explores the United States prison industry and the social impact of moving hundreds of thousands of inner-city minority offenders to distant rural outposts. The film displays competing political agendas that seem to align government policy with human rights violations, and political expediencies that bring communities into racial and cultural conflict, sometimes with prisoner suicide and prisoner abuse as consequences. Connections exist, in both practice and ideology, between human rights violations in Abu Ghraib and Guantanamo and physical and psychological abuse recorded in U.S. prisons.

== Screenings and awards ==
- In-Doc Film Festival, Jakarta, Indonesia
- Athens International Film and Video Festival "Best Documentary"
- San Francisco Frozen Film Festival
- Big Muddy Film Festival "John Michaels Award"
- Big Sky Documentary Film Festival
- Southern Fried Flicks Film Festival
- Northampton Independent Film Festival
- Rural Route Film Festival
- One World Film Festival
