= Jim Webb (poet) =

American poet, playwright and essayist

- Born: September 24, 1945; Jenkins, Kentucky US
- Died: October 22, 2018 (aged 73); Whitesburg, Kentucky US
- Education: Berea College (BS), Eastern Kentucky University (MA)

James Watson Webb (September 24, 1945 – October 22, 2018), was an Appalachian poet, playwright, and essayist. He was a founding member of the Appalachian Writers Cooperative and program manager of Appalshop's radio station, WMMT. Webb died on October 22, 2018. WMMT and Appalshop celebrated his life and legacy over the winter of 2018–2019.

== Wiley Quixote ==
Wiley Quixote is Webb's literary creation. Wiley Quixote first appeared as author of the regular newspaper column, "Ridin' Around Listenin' to the Radio..." in pages of the Sandy New Era in Williamson, West Virginia shortly after the Tug River Valley flooded in April 1977. Using self-deprecating humor, Webb created an environmentally-aware mountain character with sharp wit, a penchant for puns, and a determination to bring public attention to the adverse effects of strip-mining for coal.

Wiley Quixote was the main character in Webb's comedic play Elmo's Haven (1979), which illustrated the harsh realities and threats a small community faced at the hands of outsiders (corporate coal interests) and corrupt government officials

In 1985, Wiley Quixote took to the radio airwaves at WMMT (FM), the radio component of Appalshop. "Ridin' Around Listenin' to the Radio with Wiley Quixote" is still on the air each Wednesday.

== Material ==
Much of Webb's literary output has been destroyed (his home was burned to the ground in 1992 and 1995). In 1996, Webb established Wiley's Last Resort, a private/primitive campground on top of Pine Mountain in Letcher County, Kentucky. It is the home of the Annual Pine Mountain Tacky Lawn Ornament & Pink Flamingo Soiree (now in its 22nd year). On September 12, 2006, Webb suffered a third suspicious fire: The Tolly Ho house on Pine Mountain was burned to the ground.

In 2008, Webb started hosting the MARS Fest (Music/Art/Re-Creation/Sustainability) at Wiley's Last Resort.
