= The Meaning of the Blues =

"The Meaning of the Blues" is a 1957 jazz composition and song, with music by Bobby Troup and lyrics by Leah Worth. It was written for Troup's wife, Julie London, for her album About the Blues (1957) and recorded shortly thereafter by Miles Davis and Gil Evans on the celebrated record Miles Ahead.

This 32-bar piece is structurally not a blues. Its form follows a standard ABAC design. The overall tonality is minor, with modulations to the major mode in both the B and C sections. The melody itself has no accidentals, apart from the raised leading tone in bar 16, where the B section returns to A. The song is commonly performed at a ballad tempo, M.M.=66 or slower (Julie London's recording is at M.M.=54).

== Notable recordings ==
- Julie London - About the Blues (1957)
- Miles Davis - Miles Ahead (1957)
- Stan Kenton - Standards in Silhouette (1959)
- Linda Lawson - Introducing Linda Lawson (1960)
- Miles Davis - Miles Davis at Carnegie Hall (1961)
- Irene Kral - Better Than Anything (1963)
- Mark Murphy - That's How I Love the Blues! (1963)
- Carmen McRae - Bittersweet (1964)
- Woody Herman - Giant Steps (1973)
- Gil Evans - There Comes a Time (1975)
- Keith Jarrett - Standards (1983)
- Michael Brecker - Now You See It… (Now You Don't) (1990)
- J.J. Johnson - Tangence (1994)
- Shirley Horn - The Main Ingredient (1995)
