= Old Joe Clark =

American folk song

Single by Fiddlin’ Powers and Family
- A-side: "Ida Red"
- Released: October 31, 1924
- Recorded: August 18, 1924
- Genre: Folk
- Label: Victor

"Old Joe Clark" is a US folk song, a mountain ballad that was popular among soldiers from eastern Kentucky during World War I and afterwards. Its lyrics refer to a real person named Joseph Clark, a Kentucky mountaineer who was born in 1839 and murdered in 1885. The "playful and sometimes outlandish verses" have led to the conjecture that it first spread as a children's song and via play parties. There are about 90 stanzas in various versions of the song. The tune is based on an A major scale in the Mixolydian mode, but moreover has definite hints of a complete blues scale, namely, the flatted 3rd and 5th.

Although "Old Joe Clark" may have originated in the 19th century, no printed records are known from before 1900. An early version was printed in 1918, as sung in Virginia at that time.

"Old Joe Clark" has been described as "one of the most widely known of all Southern fiddle tunes [as of the late 20th century. ... It] has, to a degree, become part of the [United States] national repertory. One may hear it in bluegrass jam sessions, old-time fiddle sessions, and country dances throughout the United States."

Gary Cooper sang several verses of this song in the 1945 western, Along Came Jones.

== Recordings ==
The song has been recorded by many artists, including:

- 1924: Cowan Powers and his Family Band – third best selling recording that year
- 1940s: Woody Guthrie
- 1950s: Pete Seeger
- 1962: Kingston Trio
- 1968: Don Partridge on his inaugural solo album
- 1978: Robert Byrd
- 1985: Uncle Charlie Osborne
- 2010: Andy Offutt Irwin

== Modern adaptations ==
- The riff of Ian Dury's 1977 single "Sex & Drugs & Rock & Roll" originates from "Old Joe Clark".
- The melody was adapted by Mojo Nixon, Jello Biafra, and the Toadliquors for "Let's Go Burn Old Nashville Down" for their 1994 album Prairie Home Invasion, a song that has been described as a comment "on the sad state of country music in the '90s".
- On jazz guitarist Pat Metheny's 80/81 album, bassist Charlie Haden quotes from the melody of "Old Joe Clark" during his solo on "Two Folk Songs 1st | 2nd." Haden had also quoted from the song in his earlier solo in Ornette Coleman's "Ramblin'" (from 1960's Change of the Century), and the same unmistakable riff shows up as well in Haden's solo bass performance "Taney County" (on Haden's 1987 Quartet West album). Haden's preoccupation with the song is evident, too, on Rambling Boy (a reference to the 1960 Coleman song...?), the 2008 album credited to "Charlie Haden Family & Friends"; on this collection of collaborative interpretations of standards, Jack Black takes the lead singing "Old Joe Clark."
- The melody is used as part of the score (composed by Carter Burwell) for the 2019 stop-motion animated feature film Missing Link, during a bar brawl sequence. This rendition was performed by the bluegrass band The Grascals.
- Post-modern jug band Washboard Jungle frequently performed "Old Joe Clark", in an arrangement with percussion and Japan Banjo (an Indian string instrument), featured on their 1994 album "The Wash Cycle". https://washboardjungle.bandcamp.com/album/the-wash-cycle
- The melody appears in chiptune form as "Joe Clark" on the soundtrack of the 1994 game Sid Meier's Colonization.
