= Gentle Rain (Irene Kral album) =

Studio album by Irene Kral
- Released: 1978
- Recorded: August 1977
- Studio: Macdonald Studio, Sea Cliff, NY
- Genre: Vocal jazz
- Length: 43:29
- Label: Choice; CRS 1020
- Producer: Gerry Macdonald

Irene Kral chronology
Kral Space (1977)	Gentle Rain (1978)

Gentle Rain is the final album by vocalist Irene Kral performing with pianist Alan Broadbent, which was recorded in 1977 and originally released on the Choice label and re-released by Candid on CD in 2001.

== Reception ==
Professional ratings
Review scores
Source	Rating
Allmusic	4.5/5 stars
The Rolling Stone Jazz Record Guide	4/5 stars

The Allmusic review by Scott Yanow stated: "Throughout her second set of duets with pianist Alan Broadbent, Kral is almost up to the same emotional level as her previous effort, Where Is Love ... Few other singers could interpret a full program of slow ballads and hold one's interest throughout."

== Track listing ==
1. "The Gentle Rain" (Luiz Bonfá, Matt Dubey) – 5:30
2. "The Underdog" (Al Cohn, Dave Frishberg) – 4:49
3. "You Are There" (Johnny Mandel, Frishberg) – 4:41
4. "Something to Live For" (Duke Ellington, Billy Strayhorn) – 4:30
5. "If You Could See Me Now" (Tadd Dameron, Carl Sigman) – 5:38
6. "What's New?" (Bob Haggart, Johnny Burke) – 5:08
7. "The Antique Medley (What's Old): Remember/Someday I'll Find You/I'll See You Again/All Alone" (Irving Berlin/Noël Coward/Coward/Berlin) – 7:50
8. "Blue Gardenia" (Bob Russell, Lester Lee) – 5:23

== Personnel ==
- Irene Kral – vocals
- Alan Broadbent – piano
