= Tumbes =

Tumbes, Tumbez, or Túmbez may refer to:

- Tumbes, Peru
- Tumbes River or Túmbez River of Ecuador and Peru in South America
- Tumbes Region in coastal Peru
- Tumbes Province, a political subdivision of Peru
- Tumbes Reserved Zone
- Tumbez, Virginia
- Caleta Tumbes, a town and fisherman cove in Chile

== See also ==
- Tumpis Indians, a people of Ecuador and Peru
- Gulf of Guayaquil-Tumbes mangroves ecoregion of Peru and Ecuador
- Manglares de Tumbes National Sanctuary of Peru
