= Wonderful Life (Irene Kral album) =

Studio album by Irene Kral
- Released: 1965
- Recorded: 1965; Los Angeles, CA
- Genre: Vocal jazz
- Label: Mainstream; 56058/S 6058
- Producer: Harry Ringer

Irene Kral chronology
Better Than Anything (1963)	Wonderful Life (1965)	Where Is Love? (1974)

Wonderful Life is an album by vocalist Irene Kral which was originally released on the Mainstream label in 1965.

Professional ratings
Review scores
Source	Rating
Allmusic	3/5 stars

== Track listing ==
1. "Wonderful Life" (David Perrin, Lester Boxer) – 1:40
2. "There Are Days When I Don't Think of You at All" (Tommy Wolf, Fran Landesman) – 2:42
3. "There Is No Right Way" (Wolf, Ruth Batchelor) – 2:20
4. "Goin' to California" (David "Buck" Wheat, Bill Loughborough) – 2:30
5. "Is It Over Baby?" (Virginia Fitting) – 2:30
6. "I've Never Been Anything" (Wolf) – 2:45
7. "Sometime Ago" (Sergio Mihanovic) – 3:09
8. "Nothing Like You" (Bob Dorough) – 2:20
9. "Here I Go Again" (Wolf, Cy Coleman) – 2:55
10. "Mad at the World" (Bob Florence, Fred Manley) – 1:50
11. "This Life We've Led" (Wolf, Landesman, Nelson Algren) – 3:52
12. "Hold Your Head High" (Randy Newman, Jackie DeShannon) – 2:00

== Personnel ==
- Irene Kral – vocals
- Ollie Mitchell – trumpet
- Joe Burnett – flugelhorn
- Dick Leith – bass trombone
- Gene Cipriano – tenor saxophone
- Dennis Budimir, Ervan Coleman, Mike Deasy, Don Peake – guitar
- Al De Lory, Russ Freeman – piano
- Chuck Berghofer, Jimmy Bond – bass guitar
- Hal Blaine – drums
- Gene Estes, Emil Richards – percussion
- Jesse Ehrlich, Anne Goodman, Joseph Sexon – cello
