= Better Than Anything =

Studio album by Irene Kral with the Junior Mance Trio
- Released: 1963
- Recorded: June 17 & 18, 1963; World Pacific Studios, Los Angeles, CA
- Genre: Vocal jazz
- Length: 29:24
- Label: Äva; A/AS 33
- Producer: Joe Burnett

Irene Kral chronology
SteveIreneo! (1959)	Better Than Anything (1963)	Wonderful Life (1965)

Junior Mance chronology
Happy Time (1962)	Better Than Anything (1963)	Get Ready, Set, Jump!!! (1964)

Better Than Anything is an album by vocalist Irene Kral performing with Junior Mance's Trio that was recorded in 1963 and originally released on the Äva label.

== Reception ==
Professional ratings
Review scores
Source	Rating
AllMusic	4.5/5 stars
The Rolling Stone Jazz Record Guide	3/5 stars

The Allmusic review by Scott Yanow stated: "Kral is quite recognizable, although not singing with quite the emotional intensity that she would display during her final three albums (which are all classics) ... Kral was already a delightful singer."

== Track listing ==
1. "Better Than Anything" (David "Buck" Wheat, Bill Loughborough) – 2:21
2. "The Touch of Your Lips" (Ray Noble) – 2:22
3. "The Meaning of the Blues" (Bobby Troup, Leah Worth) – 3:11
4. "Rock Me to Sleep" (Benny Carter, Paul Vandervoort II) – 2:20
5. "No More" (Tutti Camarata, Bob Russell) – 3:10
6. "Passing By" (Laurent Hess, Charles Trenet, Jack Lawrence) – 1:54
7. "It's a Wonderful World" (Jan Savitt, Harold Adamson, Johnny Watson) – 2:34
8. "This Is Always" (Mack Gordon, Harry Warren) – 3:23
9. "Just Friends" (John Klenner, Sam M. Lewis) – 2:40
10. "Guess I'll Hang My Tears Out to Dry" (Jule Styne, Sammy Cahn) – 3:35
11. "Nobody Else But Me" (Jerome Kern, Oscar Hammerstein II) – 1:54

== Personnel ==
- Irene Kral – vocals
- Junior Mance – piano
- Bob Cranshaw – bass guitar
- Mickey Roker – drums

== Cover Versions ==
- Claire Martin recorded a cover on the album "The Waiting Game" (1992).
