= Uncle Charlie Osborne =

American musician

Charles Nelson Osborne (December 26, 1890 – May 27, 1992), affectionately known as "Uncle Charlie," was a musician in the Appalachian Mountains of southwest Virginia. He was born in what is now known as Cowan Osborne Hollow, named for his father, in Copper Creek, Virginia. He was regionally famous from the time he was about 15 until his death at age 101 in 1992.

Charlie had a unique style of playing the fiddle with his left hand, on a right-handed fiddle. He and his brother, Emmett Osborne, played on WOPI radio station in Bristol, Tennessee, from the early 1920s until the early 1930s. They were contemporaries of country music founders Jimmie Rodgers and the Carter Family, and occasionally gave advice to Tennessee Ernie Ford on his music.

== Personal life ==
Uncle Charlie was blinded in his left eye at age 21 when he was shot in the head with a pistol that had been stolen from him. Beginning in the 1930s, he cut back his music and farmed a large farm near the Osborne Family Homeplace in Copper Creek, Virginia. In the mid-1970s, after the death of his wife, Clara, Charlie began to focus more on his music.

== Career ==
In 1985, in conjunction with East Tennessee State University, Appalshop's June Appal Recordings recorded Uncle Charlie's first album, "Relics And Treasures". The album contained over a dozen traditional mountain songs, including "Ida Red", "Brown's Dream", and "Old Joe Clark". Uncle Charlie recorded two more albums with the label; his final was 1991's "One Hundred Years Farther On", which included the powerful and mournful mountain gospel song "Farther On," which Uncle Charlie called "As We Travel Through The Desert". Also featured on the recordings were his son, Johnny C. Osborne, on clawhammer banjo, and Tommy Bledsoe, on guitar and banjo. These recordings were reissued by June Appal Recordings as "Uncle Charlie Osborne: The June Appal Recordings."

In the 1980s, Governor Chuck Robb came to his home and presented him with an award recognizing his contributions to Virginia life and culture. Also, in the mid eighties, he and his brother Emmett began playing heavily with their half-brother, George Osborne, a former country & western singer. Their weekly or semi-weekly jam sessions became the stuff of legends.

Uncle Charlie played numerous shows at the Carter Family Fold in Scott County, Virginia, a theatre showcasing traditional music which was run by Janette Carter, one of the daughters of the original Carter Family. On one occasion, Johnny Cash was Uncle Charlie's "opening act". He was a regular performer at Mountain Empire Community College's annual Home Craft Days festivals from 1985 until his death. Other performances included the Brandywine Festival, Appalshop's Seedtime on the Cumberland festival and a campaign rally for Jesse Jackson in Hazard, KY.

== Death ==
Uncle Charlie walked three miles every day from his house in rural Tumbez, Virginia, about two miles from Lick Skillet, Virginia, and three miles from Hansonville, Virginia, until just days before his death. Uncle Charlie Osborne died on May 27, 1992, after a brief illness.

== See also ==
- Carter Family Fold
- June Appal Recordings
- Old-time music
