= Nimrod Workman =

American folk singer, coal miner and union activist (1895–1994)

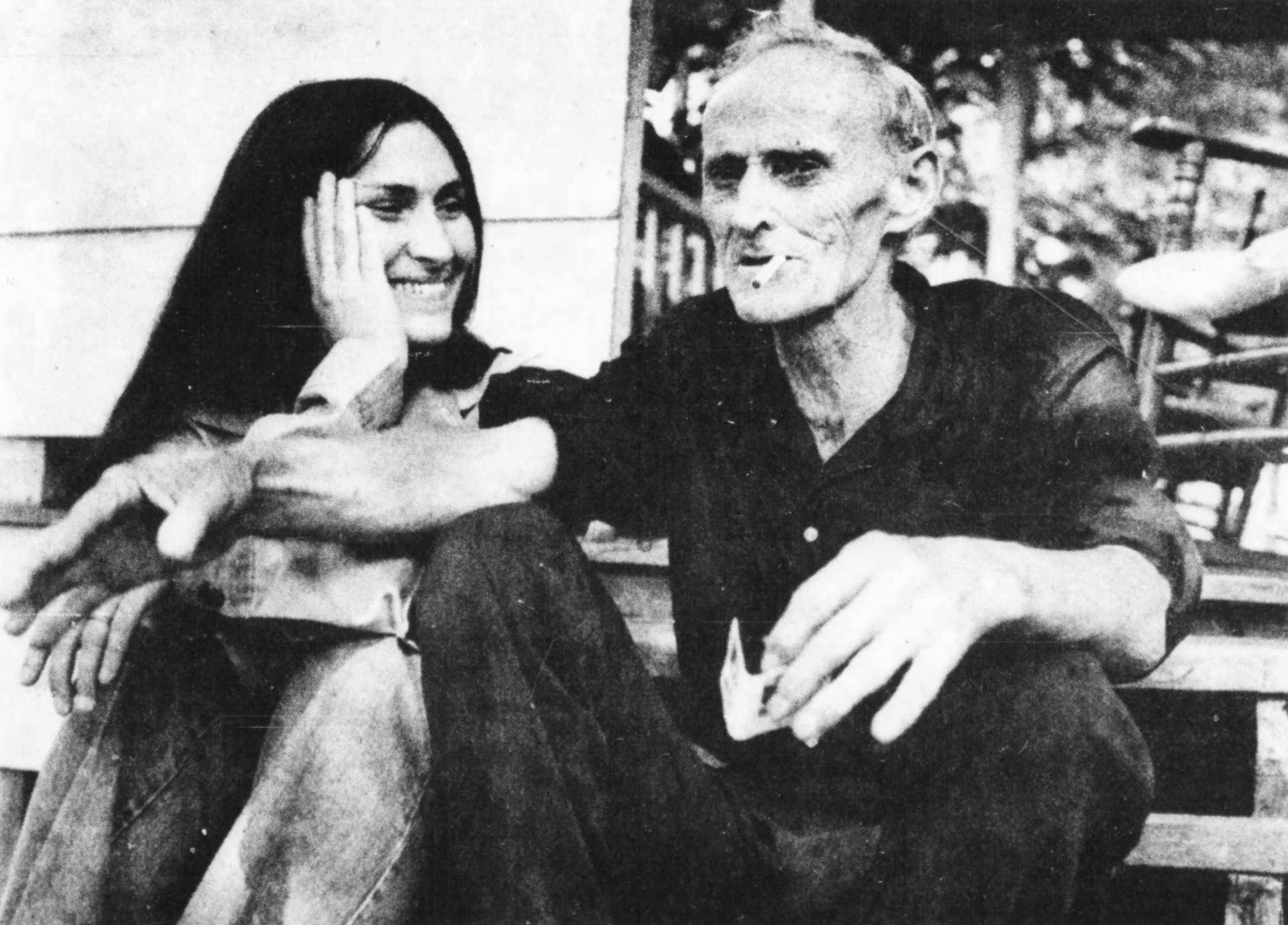
- Workman and his daughter Phyllis, 1973
- Born: November 5, 1895; Inez, Kentucky, U.S.
- Died: November 26, 1994 (aged 99); Knoxville, Tennessee, U.S.
- Occupations: Folk singer, coal miner and union activist
- Spouse: Mollie Bowens
- Children: 13, including Phyllis

Nimrod Workman (November 5, 1895 – November 26, 1994) was an American folk singer, coal miner, and trade unionist. His musical repertoire included traditional English and Scottish ballads passed down through his family, Appalachian folk songs and original compositions.

== Background ==
Nimrod Workman was born in Inez, Kentucky and was named after his grandfather Nimrod Workman (1842–1914), who taught his namesake "the old ballads from Britain about lords and ladies and the ancient Scottish wars". At the age of 14, he went to work in the Howard Collieries coal mines in Mingo County, West Virginia, and he continued working as a coal miner for forty-two years until he was forced to retire due to black lung and a slipped disc. His wife, Mollie Bowens (1912–1998), was of Italian descent on her mother's side. The couple had thirteen children.

== Activism ==
Throughout his coal mining career, Workman was active in union politics and United Mine Workers of America organizing. In 1920–1921 he worked alongside the union activist Mary Harris "Mother" Jones in West Virginia, and participated in the Battle of Blair Mountain uprising. In later years, he advocated on behalf of black lung victims, and was able to receive union compensation for his own health problems in 1971.

== Traditional music and later life ==
The songs Workman had inherited from his grandfather included versions of many Child Ballads, such as "Young Beichan", "Young Hunting", "Edward", "Little Musgrave", "Sir Lionel", "The Wife of Usher's Well", "The Farmer's Curst Wife", "Barbara Allen", "Captain Wedderburn's Courtship" and "The House Carpenter".

Following his retirement as a miner he became known as a folk singer, with frequent performances around Appalachia as well as the Smithsonian Folklife Festival and the 1982 World's Fair. He recorded two albums: Passing Thru the Garden, with his daughter Phyllis Boyens, which was released by June Appal Recordings in 1975; and Mother Jones' Will on the Rounder Records label in 1978. In addition, he contributed songs to several albums of traditional and coal mining music.

Workman was filmed by the famous archivist and ethnomusicologist Alan Lomax. He was also the subject of the documentary Nimrod Workman: To Fit My Own Category, produced by Appalshop Films, and appeared as himself in the documentaries Harlan County, USA, Chase the Devil: Religious Music of the Appalachians, and The Grand Generation. He is heard leading the singing of "Amazing Grace" in the funeral scene in Coal Miner's Daughter, which also featured Phyllis Boyens as Loretta Lynn's mother.

Workman was a recipient of a 1986 National Heritage Fellowship awarded by the National Endowment for the Arts, which is the United States government's highest honor in the folk and traditional arts.

He spent most of his life in Chattaroy, West Virginia, though in later years he lived in Mascot, Tennessee. He died in Knoxville, Tennessee in 1994 at the age of 99.

In 2025, a collection of Workman's recordings from between 1973 and 1994 were selected by the Library of Congress for preservation in the National Recording Registry.

== Discography ==
=== Albums ===
- Passing Thru the Garden (with Phyllis Boyens) (1974, June Appal Recordings JA0001)
- Mother Jones' Will (1978, Rounder Records) – this has been reissued, with an additional 7 tracks (2011, Musical Traditions Records MTCD512)
- I Want to Go Where Things Are Beautiful (2008, Twos & Fews / Drag City. Recorded by Mike Seeger, 1982.)

=== Compilation tracks ===
- The Land of Yahoe (1996, Rounder) "Way Out West in Kansas"
- Meeting's A Pleasure: Folk Songs of the Upper South, Vols. 2-4 (2005, Musical Traditions) "Dixon Said to Johnson" "Charlotte of Edinboro Town" "The House Carpenter" "I'm Drinking from the Fountain (with Mollie Workman)" "Day Is Breaking In My Soul" "Black Dress Blues"
- Traditional Music on Rounder (1981, Rounder) "Watergate Boogie"
- Come All You Coal Miners (1973, Rounder; Albatros) "Both Lungs is Broke Down" "The N and W (Don't Stop Here No More) " "Don't You Want to Go to that Land"
- Harlan County USA: Songs of the Coal Miner's Struggle (2006, Rounder) "Coal Black Mining Blues"

== Films ==
- Nimrod Workman: To Fit My Own Category (1975). Directed by Anthony Slone and Scott Faulkner. Whitesburg, Kentucky: Appalshop.
- Harlan County USA (1976). Directed by Barbara Kopple
- American Patchwork: Appalachian Journey (1991). Directed by Alan Lomax
- American Patchwork: Dreams and Songs of the Noble Old (1991). Directed by Alan Lomax
- Coal Miner's Daughter (1980). Directed by Michael Apted
- Chase the Devil: Religious Music of the Appalachians (1990). Directed by Jeremy Marre
- The Grand Generation (1993). Directed by Marjorie Hunt, Paul Wagner, and Steven Zeitlin
