= Roadhouse (Ruth Cameron album) =

Studio album by Ruth Cameron
- Recorded: October 10–13, November 18–19, 1999
- Genre: Jazz
- Label: Verve

Roadhouse is an album by jazz vocalist Ruth Cameron.

== Music and recording ==
This was Cameron's first full-length recording, after the EP First Songs. It was recorded at Capitol Studios, Studio B, Hollywood, California on October 10–13, 1999, with additional recording at Sear Sound, New York City on November 18–19, 1999. The material is standards.

== Reception ==
Professional ratings
Review scores
| Source | Rating |
|---|---|
| AllMusic | 3/5 stars |

The AllMusic reviewer William Ruhlmann wrote that "These are calm, quiet performances, which can give the songs an air of restrained passion", and commented that this approach works well on some songs but could be lacking in expression. An All About Jazz reviewer commented that Cameron lacked variety in her approach to the different songs.

== Track listing ==
1. "Something Cool"
2. "One for My Baby"
3. "My Old Flame"
4. "Body and Soul"
5. "Again"
6. "Willow Weep for Me"
7. "Happiness Is Just a Thing Called Joe"
8. "Detour Ahead"
9. "A Sunday Kind of Love"
10. "All About Ronnie"
11. "Give Me Time"
12. "Waitin' for the Train to Come"

== Personnel ==
- Ruth Cameron – vocals
- Gary Foster – tenor sax (track 7)
- Ralph Moore – tenor sax (tracks 1–3, 6, 8)
- Alan Broadbent – piano (tracks 1–3, 5, 6, 8, 10)
- Chris Dawson – piano (track 12)
- Brad Mehldau – piano (tracks 4, 11)
- Mike Melvoin – piano (tracks 7, 9)
- Federico Britos Ruiz – violin (tracks 5, 9, 12)
- Charlie Haden – bass
- Larance Marable – drums
