= Calendar Girl (Julie London album) =

Studio album by Julie London
- Released: 1956
- Recorded: May–September, 1956
- Studio: Capitol Recording Studio, Hollywood
- Genre: Traditional pop; vocal jazz
- Length: 28:20
- Label: Liberty
- Producer: Bobby Troup

Julie London chronology
Lonely Girl (1956)	Calendar Girl (1956)	About the Blues (1957)

Professional ratings
Review scores
Source	Rating
AllMusic	4/5 stars
Encyclopedia of Popular Music	3/5 stars

Calendar Girl is a studio album by American singer Julie London, released by Liberty Records under catalog number SL-9002 in 1956. In keeping with the theme, twelve songs have a month in the title, while the final track is "Thirteenth Month". Two of the songs were composed especially for this album by London's future husband, Bobby Troup, who also produced the album.

== Track listing ==
Side A
No.	Title	Writer(s)	Length
1.	"June in January"	Ralph Rainger; Leo Robin	2:11
2.	"February Brings the Rain"	Bobby Troup	2:23
3.	"Melancholy March"	Herman Saunders; Dory Langdon	2:21
4.	"I'll Remember April"	Gene de Paul; Patricia Johnston; Don Raye	2:01
5.	"People Who Are Born in May"	Earl Brent	1:42
6.	"Memphis in June"	Hoagy Carmichael; Paul Francis Webster	2:01

Side B
No.	Title	Writer(s)	Length
1.	"Sleigh Ride in July"	Jimmy Van Heusen; Johnny Burke	2:22
2.	"Time for August"	Arthur Hamilton	2:02
3.	"September in the Rain"	Harry Warren; Al Dubin	1:42
4.	"This October"	Troup	1:47
5.	"November Twilight"	Pete King; Paul Francis Webster	3:22
6.	"Warm December"	Bob Russell	1:58
7.	"Thirteenth Month"	Hamilton	2:28
Total length:			28:20

== Selected personnel ==
- Julie London – vocals
- Dick Nash – trombone
- Buddy Cole – piano
- Al Hendrickson – guitar
- Red Callender – double bass
- Milt Holland – drums
- Felix Slatkin – violin
- Eleanor Slatkin – cello
- Pete King – arranger

== Charts ==
Chart performance for Calendar Girl
Chart (1956)	Peak position
US Top LPs (Billboard)	18
