= Addie Graham =

American musician

- Born: Addie Prater; February 5, 1890; Gilmore, Kentucky
- Died: April 1, 1978 (aged 88) Cynthiana, Kentucky
- Genres: folk, traditional
- Occupation: singer

Addie Prater Graham (February 5, 1890 - April 1, 1978) was born in 1890 at Gilmore in Wolfe County in the mountains of eastern Kentucky. She was a masterful traditional singer whose life and repertoire reflect both deep tradition and an era of social change in the Appalachian Mountains. She sang ballads which trace back to the British Isles, others composed in America, frolic songs and ditties, and religious songs in the Primitive Baptist tradition. While the Old Baptist belief of her parents forbade the use of musical instruments, she became an accomplished unaccompanied singer in the complex, highly ornamented style of Kentucky's oral tradition.

Addie's repertoire included several extremely uncommon songs, including "We're Stole and Sold From Africa," an anti-slavery song which seems to have originated in the antebellum Abolitionist movement. She also sang a number of songs of African-American origin, many of which she learned from black railroad builders.

Addie married Amos Graham, a native of Wolfe County, and lived for many years in Breathitt County. Eventually the family moved to Cynthiana, where she died on April 1, 1978.

== Recordings ==
Addie's grandson Rich Kirby and folklorist Barbara (Edwards) Kunkle produced an LP of her singing, released in 1978 on Appalshop's June Appal record label. Since then her music has been recorded by Mike Seeger, Alice Gerrard, Ginny Hawker, and John McCutcheon, and others. In 2008 Been A Long Time Traveling was remastered as a CD with eight additional songs.

Online recordings of the following folk songs appear at Digital Library of Appalachia:

- "Went Up The Hillside"
- "Been a Long Time Traveling Here""--Folk song sung by Addie Graham and recorded by Barbara Kunkle 1975.
- "Can't Get A Letter from Home"--Folk song sung by Addie Graham and accompanied by Jean Ritchie and recorded at the Mountain Heritage Festival in Carter County, Kentucky, 1973.
- "Little Omie Wise"--Folk song sung by Addie Graham Breathitt County, Kentucky, and recorded by Barbara Kunkle 3-29-75.
- "Miller's Will"--Folk song sung by Addie Graham and recorded at the Mountain Heritage Festival in Carter County, Kentucky, 1973.
- "Stole and Sold from Africa"--Folk song sung by Addie Graham and accompanied by Jean Ritchie and recorded at the Mountain Heritage Festival in Carter County, Kentucky, 1973.

== Sample lyrics ==
"Stole and Sold from Africa"
traditional

We're stole and sold from Africa
Transported to America
Like hogs and sheep we march in drove
To bear the heat, endure the cold.

See how they take us from our wives
Small children from their mother's side
They take us to some foreign land
Make slaves to wait on gentlemen.

We're almost naked, as you see
Almost bare-footed as we be
Suffer the lash, endure the pain
Exposed to snow, both wind and rain.

Oh Lord, have mercy and look down
Upon the race of the African kind
Upon our knees pour out our griefs
And pray to God for some relief.

== Style ==
In addition to the traditional folk and mountain music styles, she was also known for her "Old Regular-style religious songs". She sang "in a simple, straightforward style, unaccompanied and without excessive embellishment."

== Family ==
Her grandson, Rich Kirby is often on staff at the Cowan Creek Mountain Music School held just outside Whitesburg, Kentucky each summer. He is retired from the staff at Appalshop.

He first learned traditional music from his grandmother. During the old-time music revival of the 1970s, he performed with John McCutcheon and Tom Bledsoe as "Wry Straw." He can be heard on three June Appal LPs: From Earth to Heaven, They Can't Put It Back, and Hits From Home. He has produced two June Appal Recordings, Lee Sexton's Whoa Mule and his grandmother's Been a Long Time Traveling. Mr Kirby served as presenter at the 2003 Smithsonian Folk Life Festival and has also taught at the Appalachian Family Folk Week, Augusta and the Swannanoa Gathering held at Warren Wilson College just outside Asheville, North Carolina each summer.
