= Kral Space =

Studio album by Irene Kral
- Released: 1977
- Recorded: June 1977
- Studio: Sage & Sound Studios, Hollywood, CA
- Genre: Vocal jazz
- Length: 37:14
- Label: Catalyst; CAT 7625
- Producer: Dennis Smith and Pat Britt

Irene Kral chronology
Where Is Love? (1974)	Kral Space (1977)	Gentle Rain (1977)

Kral Space is an album by vocalist Irene Kral, recorded in 1977 for the Catalyst label.

== Reception ==
Professional ratings
Review scores
Source	Rating
AllMusic	4.5/5 stars
The Rolling Stone Jazz Record Guide	3/5 stars

The AllMusic review by Scott Yanow stated: "Kral is heard throughout at the peak of her powers on this haunting session ... Her basic but heartfelt style and her ability to swing at the slowest tempos make Irene Kral one of jazz's great ballad singers." On All About Jazz. Mathew Bahl said: "Always impeccably in tune, Irene Kral had a dry, resonant alto which she deployed to devastating effect. Her art was in her phrasing, which was aided by perfect diction and marked by her tendency to elongate her vowels. She could swing with the best of them, but no matter how fast the tempo, the lyrics always remained intact and their meaning driven home. Yet, it is the quiet intensity of her ballads that lingers most in the mind... All of Irene Kral’s talents are wonderfully displayed on Kral Space and the music is recommended without hesitation."

== Track listing ==
1. "Wheelers and Dealers" (Dave Frishberg) – 2:40
2. "Star Eyes" (Gene de Paul, Don Raye) – 5:49
3. "It Wasn't So Good It Couldn't Get Better" (Tommy Wolf, Fran Landesman) – 2:04
4. "Once Upon Another Time" (Lan O'Kun) – 4:59
5. "Experiment" (Cole Porter) – 2:00
6. "Small Day Tomorrow" (Bob Dorough, Landesman) – 4:00
7. "Some Time Ago" (Sergio Mihanovich) – 5:15
8. "It's Nice Weather for Ducks" (Wolf, Landesman) – 2:22
9. "Ev'ry Time We Say Goodbye" (Porter) – 6:29
10. "The Song Is You" (Jerome Kern, Oscar Hammerstein II) – 1:36

== Personnel ==
- Irene Kral – vocals
- Alan Broadbent – piano
- Fred Atwood – bass
- Nick Ceroli – drums
- Emil Richards – vibraphone, percussion
