= About the Blues =

Studio album by Julie London
- Released: 1957
- Recorded: 1956–1957
- Studio: Radio Recorders, Hollywood
- Genre: Traditional pop, vocal jazz
- Length: 45:12
- Label: Liberty
- Producer: Bobby Troup

Julie London chronology
Calendar Girl (1956)	About the Blues (1957)	Make Love to Me (1957)

About the Blues is an album by Julie London that was released in 1957. The album includes two songs written by Bobby Troup, her husband. Miles Davis recorded a version of one of them, "The Meaning of the Blues". The eighteen-piece band was arranged by Russell Garcia.

== Track listing ==
Track number	Title	Songwriter(s)	Time
1	"Basin Street Blues"	Spencer Williams	3:03
2	"I Gotta Right to Sing the Blues"	Harold Arlen, Ted Koehler	2:56
3	"A Nightingale Can Sing the Blues"	Dick Charles, Larry Markes	3:08
4	"Get Set for the Blues"	Joe Karnes	2:42
5	"Invitation to the Blues"	Doris Fisher, Arthur Gershwin, Allan Roberts	2:48
6	"Bye Bye Blues"	Fred Hamm, David Bennett, Bert Lown, Chauncey Gray	1:38
7	"Meaning of the Blues"	Bobby Troup, Leah Worth	2:56
8	"About the Blues"	Arthur Hamilton	3:05
9	"Sunday Blues"	Leonard Adelson, Jeff Clarkson	2:53
10	"The Blues Is All I Ever Had"	Troup	2:49
11	"Blues in the Night"	Arlen, Johnny Mercer	3:39
12	"Bouquet of Blues"	Hamilton	2:55
13	"Baby, Baby All the Time" *	Troup	2:25
14	"Shadow Woman" *	Hamilton	2:39
15	"Meaning of the Blues" *	Bobby Troup, Leah Worth	2:58
16	"Dark" *	Edwin Greines	2:38

- Bonus tracks on the CD release

== Selected personnel ==
- Julie London - vocals
- Willie Smith - alto saxophone
- Maynard Ferguson - trumpet
- Barney Kessel - guitar
- Shelly Manne - drums
- Russ Garcia - arranger, conductor
