= Phyllis Boyens =

American singer and actress (1947–2009)

Background information
- Born: Phyllis Workman; February 22, 1947; Lobata, West Virginia, US
- Died: December 9, 2009 (aged 62) Bradenton, Florida, US
- Genre: Appalachian music
- Occupations: Musician; Actor
- Instrument: Singer
- Years active: 1974–2009
- Spouses: Bruce Boyens; Ralph Liptak

Phyllis S. Boyens (née Workman; February 22, 1947 – December 9, 2009), also known as Phyllis Liptak, was an American folk singer and actress. Her music was in the genre of "Mountain Music", also known as Appalachian music. She was the daughter of American folk singer and coal miner Nimrod Workman.

In 1976, she appeared in the Academy Award–winning documentary Harlan County, USA with her father. In 1980, she starred in another Academy Award-winning film, Coal Miner's Daughter. In the film she played the role of Clara Webb, the mother of the character Loretta Lynn.

== Early life ==
External image
- Phyllis Boyens and father Nimrod Workman, from the Southern Folklife Collection

She was born Phyllis S. Workman on February 22, 1947, in Lobata, West Virginia. Her father Nimrod Workman was a folk singer, coal miner, and trade unionist and her mother Mollie was a homemaker. She was one of 13 children. The Tennessean newspaper said she performed as an "authentic mountain woman" playing what was called Mountain Music.

== Career ==
Boyens recorded the album Passing Thru the Garden in 1974. Her father recorded the album with her. In 1976, she sang "Oh, Death" with her father in the documentary Harlan County, USA. Workman's music was an essential part of the film. After the film's success, including it winning the 1976 Academy Award for Best Documentary, both Workman and Boyens gained widespread media attention.

In 1977, she joined Hazel Dickens, Bill Worthington, Guy Carawan, and Candie Carawan in playing at a Christmas benefit concert at an Episcopal church for striking coal miners from Stearns, Kentucky. The miners had been on strike for seventeen months hoping to force the Blue Diamond Coal Company to sign a contract with the United Mine Workers of America.

In 1980, Boyens was selected to be a cast member in the movie Coal Miner's Daughter. She played the character of Clara Webb, who was the mother of Loretta Lynn in the movie. Levon Helm of the Band played alongside her as Lynn's father. She also appeared in the made-for-television drama The Dollmaker (1984). Helm recommended Boyens for the part. Boyens's song "Mean Papa Blues", recorded for her solo album I Really Care, appeared on the 1992 soundtrack to Guncrazy. The role in Coal Miner's Daughter was Boyens's first time acting in a movie. The Knoxville News-Sentinel called her performance "brilliant" and said Boyens had received numerous film offers. The newspaper also stated that "Boyens was the only non-Hollywood-type to have a significant part in the film". Boyens stated, "I'm not fooling myself into thinking I'm a great actress just yet anyway and singing is still my first love".

Rounder Records released Boyens's only solo album, I Really Care, in 1983. The album's tracks were divided between two genres. Half of the songs were country and the other half were bluegrass with backing tracks by the Johnson Mountain Boys. She recorded multiple songs for the 1984 compilation album They'll Never Keep Her Down, a collection of coal-mining songs by female vocalists. Boyens's tracks on the compilation featured The Dreadful Snakes, a bluegrass group with Béla Fleck on banjo and Jerry Douglas on steel guitar.

== Personal life ==
Phyllis Boyens and her husband Bruce Boyens lived in Mascot, Tennessee. In 1981, a musician who Boyens previously worked with burned the couple's house down. The arsonist siphoned gas from his vehicle and used it as an accelerant. The house was burned to the ground and the arsonist was subsequently arrested.

In 1992, Boyens married Ralph Liptak and lived in Bradenton, Florida. Boyens died due to complications related to cancer on December 9, 2009.
