= Michael J. Kennedy (melodeon player) =

Irish musician, melodeon

Kennedy plays the jig "Sorry I Am" on melodeon:

Michael J. Kennedy (1900–1978) was an Irish player of the melodeon (one-row diatonic accordion).

Kennedy was born in Flaskagh Beag in County Galway, and at age 11 took up playing the melodeon. In 1923 he emigrated to Cincinnati in the United States, and spent his career there working for the Louisville and Nashville Railroad.

Kennedy's instrument of choice was the Hohner 10-button melodeon in the key of G. Despite having emigrated, his lifelong selection of tunes was taken from those he learned in Galway.

The Knoxville, Tennessee branch of the Comhaltas Ceoltóirí Éireann is named in his honor.

== Discography ==
Sorry I Am
Kennedy plays a jig on his melodeon.

- Sixty-Five Years of Irish Music (June Appal, 1977)
- The Green House (Sleepy Creek, 2001) - three bonus tracks
