= Developing Story =

Studio album by Alan Broadbent
- Released: 2017
- Recorded: November 28–29, 2015
- Studio: Abbey Road Studios, London
- Genre: Orchestral jazz
- Length: 65:35
- Label: Eden River/Universal

Alan Broadbent chronology
Songbook (2017)	Developing Story (2017)

Developing Story is a 2017 album arranged by Alan Broadbent and performed by the London Metropolitan Orchestra. The album received five stars in a review at All About Jazz.

== Track listing ==
- All music by Alan Broadbent unless otherwise stated
1. "Developing Story: Movement 1" – 9:49
2. "Developing Story: Movement 2" – 7:11
3. "Developing Story: Movement 3" – 9:18
4. "If You Could See Me Now" (Tadd Dameron) – 6:35
5. "Naima" (John Coltrane) – 8:28
6. "Blue in Green" (Miles Davis) – 8:06
7. "Lady in the Lake" – 4:34
8. "Milestones" (Davis) – 5:02
9. "Children of Lima" – 6:22

== Personnel ==
- Alan Broadbent – arranger, conductor
- Harvie S – double bass
- Peter Erskine – drums
- The London Metropolitan Orchestra
