= Ruth Cameron =

American record producer and jazz singer (1947–2021)

Ruth Cameron (June 4, 1947, Vancouver, Canada – September 11, 2021, Westlake Village, California) was an American record producer and jazz vocalist.

== Biography ==
Cameron came from a musical family, but first trained as an actor, performing in theaters in North America and Europe. After marrying bassist Charlie Haden in 1984, she became his manager and co-produced many of his albums. Land of the Sun, a Haden album she co-produced, won the Grammy Award for Best Latin Jazz Album in 2005.

Cameron also studied singing, notably with Jeri Southern and Sue Raney. Her first recording (1997) was First Songs, for EmArcy Records, with Haden, drummer Larance Marable, and pianist Chris Dawson. Her second album, recorded in 1999 for Verve Records, was Roadhouse. She also appeared on the Haden family's 2008 bluegrass album, Rambling Boy. She was one of the vocalists on Haden's 2010 Quartet West album, Sophisticated Ladies, and in 2011 she performed with Quartet West in the Charlie Haden London concerts.

== Personal life ==
Ruth Cameron was married to musician and composer Charlie Haden from 1984 until his death in 2014.

== Discography ==
=== As leader ===
- Roadhouse (Verve, 1999)
- First Songs (Emarcy, 1997)

=== As guest ===
- Charlie Haden Sophisticated Ladies (EmArcy, 2011)
- Charlie Haden Rambling Boy (EmArcy, 2008)
