= Sparky and Rhonda Rucker =

Musical duo

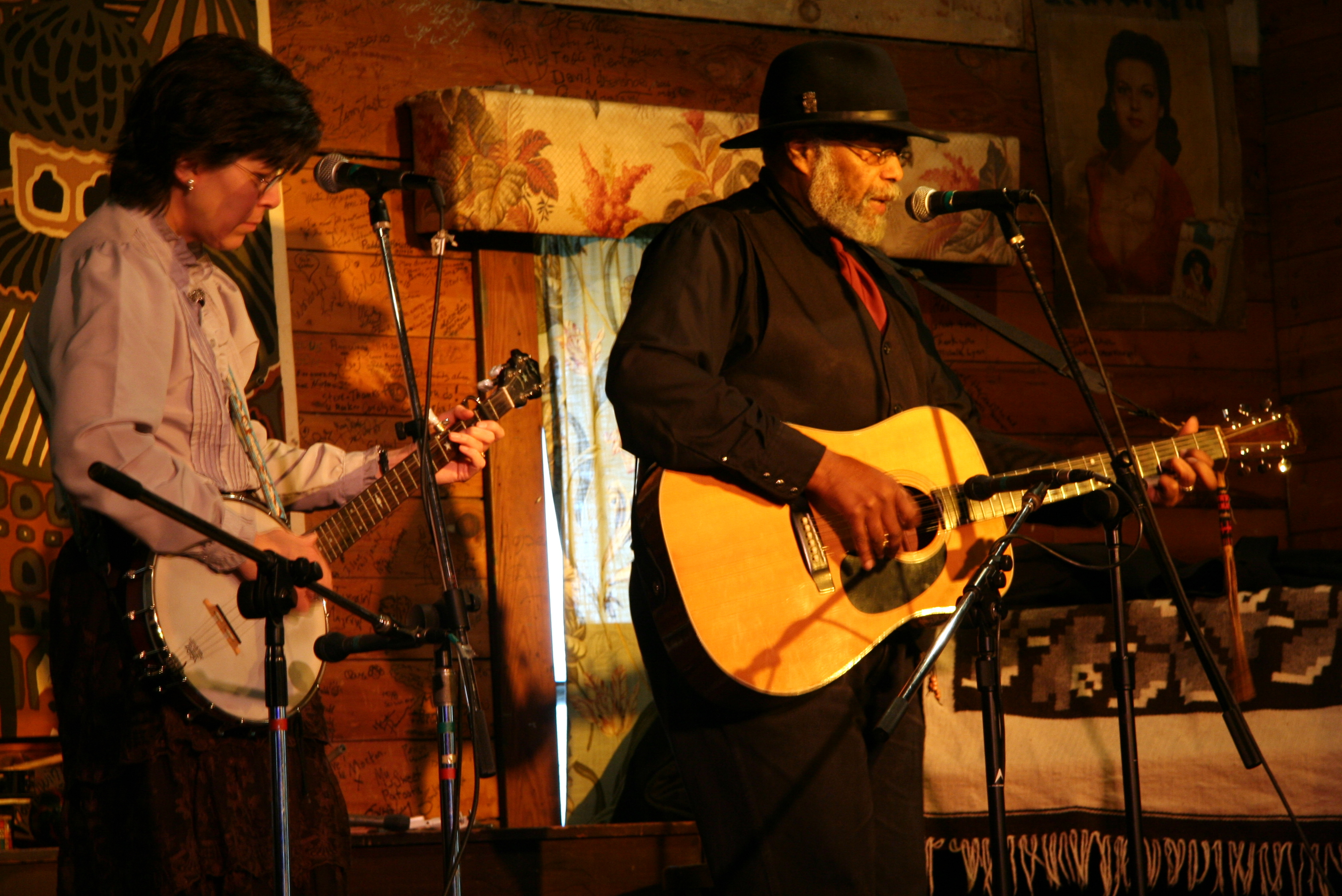
Sparky and Rhonda Rucker performing in Oak Center, Minnesota

Sparky (James) and Rhonda Rucker are a performing duo. They travel to various places to sing folk and traditional music. They have been nominated for musical awards. Combined, they have released 16 albums. Ten of these albums were together. Their album, Treasures and Tears, was in the running for an award (the W.C. Handy Award for Best Traditional Recording). Their music style is vast, including blues, Appalachian music, slave songs, storytelling, etc.

Sparky Rucker is from Knoxville, Tennessee. He is a civil rights activist. He attended the University of Tennessee and attained a degree. After school, he became a teacher in Chattanooga before becoming a singer full-time. Today, Sparky continues to sing and teaches music in places such as Common Ground on the Hill, Maryland and Augusta Heritage Center, West Virginia. Sparky has contributed to a few books during his time as well.

Rhonda Rucker is from Louisville, Kentucky. She is an author and storyteller along with being a musician. She plays multiple instruments including the banjo and harmonica. Before she was all of these things, she worked in the medical profession. She attended the University of Kentucky where she completed all medical school requirements. Rhonda has taught courses at the University of Tennessee as well as at multiple events and festivals.

== Discography ==
- Cold & Lonesome on a Train (1977) June Appal Recordings and (1990) Tremont
- Heroes & Hard Times (1981) Green Linnet Records
- A Home in Tennessee (1981) A Gentle Wind
- Drive Back the Night - live(1983) L&R Records - Live recording of Sparky's solo performance at the 1983 Old Time Music and Craft Festival in Shawano, Wisconsin
- A Magic Night - live (1983) Makin’ Jam
- The Blue & Gray in Black & White (1989) Flying Fish Records
- Treasures & Tears (1990) Flying Fish Records Sparky and Rhonda's first recording as a duo.
- Eventide: Songs of Celebration (1991) Tremont
- Heroes & Hard Times - Black American Ballads and Stories (2002) Tremont
- Midnight Memories (2004) Tremont
- Done Told the Truth Goodbye (2006) Tremont
- The Mountains Above & The Valleys Below (2008) Tremont
- One Earth (2009) Tremont
- Let Freedom Ring (2012) Tremont
- Down By the Riverside (2017) Tremont

== Books ==
- Swing Low, Sweet Harriet by Rhonda Rucker
- Welcome to Bombingham by Rhonda Rucker
- Make a Change by Rhonda Rucker
- "Telling Tales in Tandem" by Sparky and Rhonda Rucker for the book, Team Up! Tell In Tandem!
- Sparky Rucker contributes to August House book for Scary Stories
- Sparky Rucker contributes to Encyclopedia of Appalachia
