= Rambling Boy (Charlie Haden album) =

Studio album by Charlie Haden Family & Friends
- Released: September 2008
- Recorded: January 5–12, 2008; April 12 and 14, 2008; April 26, 2008
- Studios: Skaggs Place Studios, RS/Entertainment, Nashville, Tennessee; NY Noise, New York City; Glenwood Place Studios, Burbank, California
- Genres: Jazz, folk, country
- Labels: Decca; B0011639-02; Emarcy; 0602517791657
- Producers: Charlie Haden, Ruth Cameron

Charlie Haden chronology
The Private Collection (2007)	Rambling Boy (2008)	Jasmine (2010)

Rambling Boy is an album by bassist Charlie Haden. It was recorded in January and April 2008 at various locations, and was released later that year by Decca and Emarcy Records. On the album, Haden is joined by his "Family & Friends," including members of his immediate family plus guest musicians.

Although Haden is best known for his involvement in jazz, he began his musical career at age 2 as part of the Haden Family Band, playing the role of a yodeling cowboy. Rambling Boy came about when, at a gathering to celebrate his mother's 80th birthday, Haden's wife Ruth Cameron suggested that the family sing "You Are My Sunshine". The event revived an idea for a recording that had been in the back of Haden's mind for years. The album, which includes songs made famous by the Carter Family and Hank Williams as well as original and traditional pieces, features appearances by Haden's wife and children, as well as over a dozen guest musicians.

The album was followed by a 2009 documentary film titled Rambling Boy, written and directed by Reto Caduff.

== Reception ==
Professional ratings
Review scores
Source	Rating
AllMusic	3.5/5 stars
DownBeat	5/5 stars
All About Jazz	4.5/5 stars

The track titled "Is This America? (Katrina 2005)" was nominated for "Best Country Instrumental Performance" at the 51st Annual Grammy Awards.

In a review for AllMusic, Thom Jurek wrote: "Saying that... Rambling Boy is a personal album is an understatement... Despite the wide range of players here, this album can only be called Americana in the strictest sense of the term as its selections are new readings of mostly traditional folk and country songs."

DownBeat awarded the album a full 5 stars, and Paul de Barros stated: "Hearing Haden play this music today... is a revelation. It is not only a homecoming, but a brave illumination of the source of the soulfulness [Ornette] Coleman would hear in him so many years later."

John Kelman of All About Jazz noted that the album "is proof of the inestimable value of music and kin, joined together to create the kind of close bond that sadly no longer exists for so many," and commented: "An unexpected but moving addition to Haden's discography, Rambling Boy may be the bassist's most deeply personal album to date."

Writing for Jazz Times, Michael J. West called the album "gorgeous," and remarked: "Rambling Boy may be an anomaly in [Haden's] catalogue, but it's a marvelous one."

== Track listing ==
1. "Single Girl, Married Girl" (A. P. Carter) – 2:38
2. "Rambling Boy" (Walter T. Adams) – 2:58
3. "20/20 Vision" (Joe Allison/Milton Estes) – 4:16
4. "Wildwood Flower" (A. P. Carter) – 3:35
5. "Spiritual" (Josh Haden) – 6:14
6. "Oh, Take Me Back" (A. P. Carter) – 2:19
7. "You Win Again" (Hank Williams) – 3:12
8. "The Fields of Athenry" (Pete St John) – 7:29
9. "Ocean Of Diamonds" (Clifford Carnahan) – 3:38
10. "He's Gone Away" (Charlie Haden/Pat Metheny) – 4:32
11. "A Voice From On High" (Bessie Mauldin/Bill Monroe) – 4:16
12. "Down by the Salley Gardens" (words by W. B. Yeats) – 4:30
13. "Road of Broken Hearts" (Gervis Stanford) – 2:29
14. "Is This America? (Katrina 2005)" (Pat Metheny) – 3:40
15. "Tramp on the Street" (Grady Cole/Hazel M. Cole) – 4:57
16. "Old Joe Clark" (Traditional) – 4:06
17. "Seven Year Blues" (Eddie Hill/Charlie Louvin/Ira Louvin) – 2:41
18. "Old Haden Family Show 1939" (Haden Family) – 1:43
19. "Oh Shenandoah" (Traditional) – 3:49

== Personnel ==
Musicians (family & friends)

- Charlie Haden – bass, vocals
- Russ Barenberg – guitar, mandolin
- Jack Black – vocals
- Sam Bush – mandolin
- Ruth Cameron – vocals
- Rosanne Cash – vocals
- Elvis Costello – vocals
- Jerry Douglas – dobro
- Stuart Duncan – fiddle
- Béla Fleck – banjo
- Vince Gill – vocals
- Buddy Greene – harmonica
- Josh Haden – vocals
- Petra Haden – vocals
- Rachel Haden – vocals
- Tanya Haden – vocals, cello
- Bruce Hornsby – piano, vocals
- John Leventhal – guitar
- Pat Metheny – guitar
- Ricky Skaggs – guitar, mandolin, banjo, vocals
- Bryan Sutton – guitar
- Dan Tyminski – vocals, mandolin
- Buck White – piano

Production

- Charlie Haden – producer
- Ruth Cameron – producer
- Craig Bishop – executive manager
- Garrett Shelton – project manager
- Rich Breen – engineer (mixing)
- Steve Rod – engineer (mixing)
- Tom Baker – engineer (mastering)
- Bil VornDick – engineer
- Mark Aarvold – engineer
- Rick DeProfi – engineer
- Lee Groitsch – second engineer
- Morgan Hobbs – assistant engineer
- Dean Berner – engineer (intern)
- Craig Bishop – photography
- Jim McGuire – photography
- Latifa Metheny – photography
- Marc Burckhardt – cover art
