= Sophisticated Ladies (Charlie Haden album) =

Studio album by Charlie Haden Quartet West
- Released: November 2010
- Recorded: May 20 & 21, June 4 and July 12 & 26, 2010
- Studios: Capitol (Hollywood); Avatar (New York City)
- Genre: Jazz
- Length: 60:17
- Labels: EmArcy; 0 602527 508160
- Producers: Charlie Haden and Ruth Cameron

Charlie Haden chronology
Jasmine (2010)	Sophisticated Ladies (2010)	Come Sunday (2012)

Quartet West chronology
The Private Collection (2007)	Sophisticated Ladies (2010)

Sophisticated Ladies is an album by Charlie Haden's Quartet West with guest vocalists Cassandra Wilson, Diana Krall, Melody Gardot, Norah Jones, Renee Fleming and Ruth Cameron, and a string orchestra arranged and conducted by Alan Broadbent which was released on the EmArcy label.

== Reception ==
Professional ratings
Review scores
Source	Rating
Allmusic	3.5/5 stars
The Guardian	4/5 stars
PopMatters	7/10 stars
All About Jazz	4.5/5 stars

Allmusic awarded the album 3½ stars and said, "Sophisticated Ladies does fall just short at times of mimicking a brand of saccharine faux-post-big-band jazz that flourished in the '50s and early '60s, but Haden and his team are too masterful to allow their tribute to lose its stylishness and, of course, its sophistication". Writing in The Guardian, John Fordham observed, "Haden's patient lyricism and devotion to classic song melody always exhibit a disguised intensity and a flawless touch ... all the performances are touched by Haden's instinct for doing the right thing quietly". PopMatters' Steven Horowitz said, "Haden’s presence as bassist may not be the most audible feature on the disc, but the evidence here certainly shows that he commands the respect and effort of his band and guest vocalists. The music is consistently smooth and satisfying". Martin Longley of BBC Music said, "Haden has managed to entice some of the most renowned jazz songbirds in the world, and their combined efforts are cumulatively sombre, with a frisson of bittersweet fatalism. Sometimes this build-up can establish a cocktail lounge atmosphere, but in most cases its emotional resonances hover on the right side of poignant". On All About Jazz Chris May wrote, "With top drawer vocals, a virtuoso jazz backbone, immaculate audio quality and engaging liner notes by executive producer Jean-Philippe Allard, Sophisticated Ladies is a delight".

== Track listing ==
1. "If I'm Lucky" (Eddie DeLange, Josef Myrow) – 5:39
2. "Sophisticated Lady" (Duke Ellington, Mitchell Parish, Irving Mills) – 4:28
3. "Ill Wind" (Harold Arlen, Ted Koehler) – 4:25
4. "Today I Am a Man" (Steve Kuhn) – 5:23
5. "My Love and I" (David Raksin, Johnny Mercer) – 4:14
6. "Theme from Markham" (Stanley Wilson) – 4:40
7. "Let's Call It a Day' (Ray Henderson, Lew Brown) – 5:52
8. "Angel Face" (Hank Jones) – 4:08
9. "A Love Like This" (Victor Young, Ned Washington) – 5:13
10. "My Old Flame" (Sam Coslow, Arthur Johnston) – 5:35
11. "Goodbye" (Gordon Jenkins) – 5:48
12. "Wahoo" (Benny Harris) – 4:52

== Personnel ==
Musicians

- Charlie Haden – bass, arranger
- Ernie Watts – tenor saxophone
- Alan Broadbent – piano
- Rodney Green – drums
- Alan Broadbent – arranger (string orchestra), conductor (tracks 1–2, 5, 7, 9 & 11)
- Melody Gardot – vocals (track 1)
- Norah Jones – vocals (track 3)
- Cassandra Wilson – vocals (track 5)
- Ruth Cameron – vocals (track 7)
- Renee Fleming – vocals (track 9)
- Diana Krall – vocals (track 11)

Production

- Charlie Haden – producer
- Ruth Cameron – producer
- Jean-Philippe Allard – executive producer, A&R, liner notes
- Joe D'Ambrosio – project coordinator
- Wulf Müller – project supervisor
- Rick Starr – song researcher
- Farida Bachir – production management
- Vince Caro – engineer (Hollywood)
- Charlie Paakkari – assistant engineer (Hollywood)
- Jay Newland – engineer (New York, mixing)
- Justin Gerrish – assistant engineer (New York)
- Fernando Lodeiro – assistant engineer (New York)
- Tom Baker – mastering
- Oink Creative – artwork
- Steven Perilloux – photography
- Petra Haden – photography (assistant)
