= Heartplay =

Studio album by Charlie Haden and Antonio Forcione
- Released: October 2006
- Recorded: June 26–28, 2006
- Studio: Instrumental Studios, The Herb Alpert School of Music, California Institute of the Arts
- Genre: Jazz
- Length: 49:43
- Label: Naim

Charlie Haden chronology
Helium Tears (2005)	Heartplay (2006)	The Private Collection (2007)

Heartplay is an album by bassist Charlie Haden and guitarist Antonio Forcione, recorded in 2006 and released on the Naim label.

== Reception ==
The AllMusic review by Jonathan Widran stated, "While well played and intricately performed, this type of date, focused more on craft than any sustainable energy, is best enjoyed by die-hard fans of the two artists".

Professional ratings
Review scores
Source	Rating
AllMusic	2.5/5 stars
The Penguin Guide to Jazz Recordings	3/4 stars

== Track listing ==
All compositions by Antonio Forcione except where noted.

1. "Anna" - 3:58
2. "If..." - 2:57
3. "La Pasionaria" (Charlie Haden) - 8:21
4. "Snow" - 6:02
5. "Silence" (Haden) - 6:22
6. "Child's Song" (Fred Hersch) - 8:05
7. "Nocturne" - 2:38
8. "For Turiya" (Haden) - 11:13
- Recorded at The Herb Alpert School of Music, California Institute of the Arts on June 26–28, 2006

== Personnel ==
Musicians

- Charlie Haden – bass
- Antonio Forcione – guitar

Production

- Paul Stephenson (Naim)
- Anna Tooth (Naim)
- Chris Koster (Naim USA)
- Ken Christianson – engineer, photography
- BigKick! Creations – design
- Antonio Forcione – photography (cover)
