= Antonio Forcione =

Italian jazz guitarist

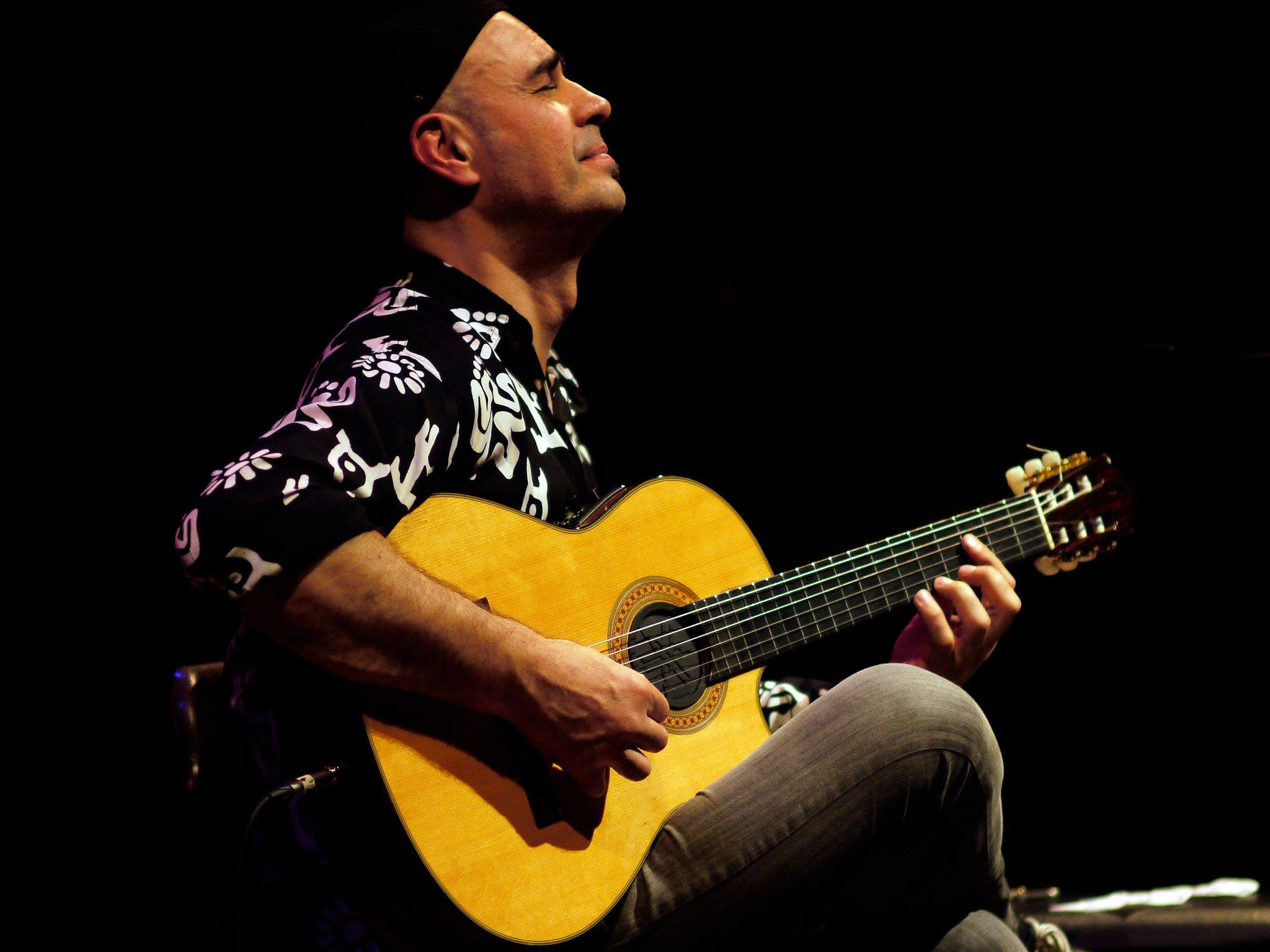

Background information
- Born: 2 May 1960 (age 66); Molise, Italy
- Genre: Jazz
- Occupations: Musician; composer
- Instrument: Guitar
- Years active: 1990s–present
- Label: Naim
- Website: www.antonioforcione.com

Antonio Forcione is an Italian guitarist and composer. His 2000 album Live! was recorded at The Vortex in London. He also recorded a duet album with bassist Charlie Haden – Heartplay.

== Biography ==
Forcione grew up on the Adriatic coast of the Molise region of southern Italy. By the age of 11, he was playing Italian folk music, accompanying two accordion-playing uncles on guitar and mandolin. He toured Italy at the age of 13 in the 1970s. Coming to London in May 1983, he busked in Covent Garden, and won a Time Out busking award.

== Influences and Instruments ==
Charles Alexander, writing in Jazzwise, states that Forcione has "influences ranging from flamenco to Balkan and from Arabic to American acoustic guitar styles, but he is thoroughly conversant with the jazz language." Forcione names Carlos Santana, Jimi Hendrix, John McLaughlin and Pink Floyd's David Gilmour as his "guitar heroes".

Forcione's main instrument is the guitar, both six string and twelve-string. He also created an instrument, the oudan. “I bought an oud but after 40 years of playing the guitar I struggled to adjust my technique to an unfretted instrument with different spacings. So I took some frets off a guitar and put them on the oud – it's like an entirely new instrument.” He uses this, for instance, on the track Tarifa on Sketches of Africa.

== Style ==
Forcione composes and plays in genres such as folk, world music, jazz, Latin, and fusion.

== Discography ==
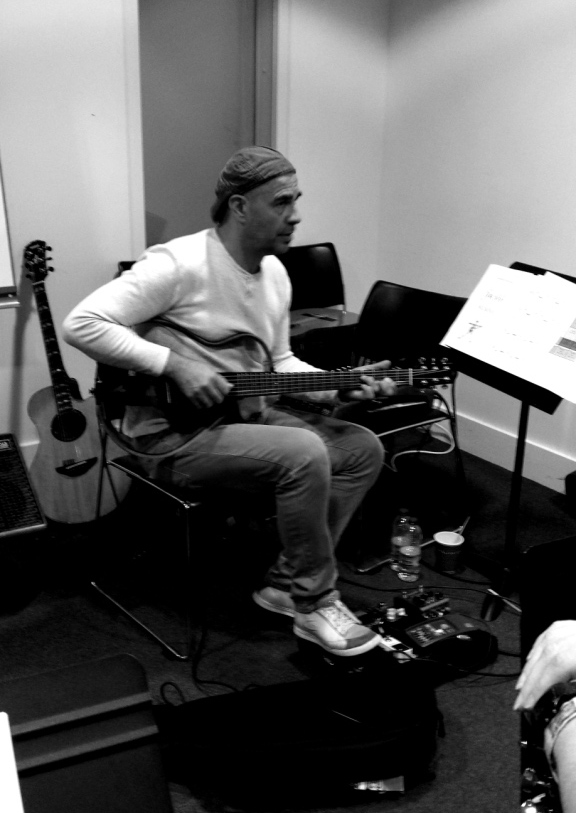
At the IGF London Guitar Summit 2015 Contemporary Acoustic course at Kings Place

- Light & Shade with Eduardo Niebla (Sol, 1984)
- Eurotour with Eduardo Niebla (Sol, 1985)
- Celebration with Eduardo Niebla (Venture, 1987)
- Poema with Eduardo Niebla (Jazzpoint, 1992)
- Dedicato (Naim, 1996)
- Acoustic Revenge (Naim, 1997)
- Ghetto Paradise (Naim, 1998)
- Meet Me in London with Sabina Sciubba (Naim, 1998)
- Vento Del Sud with Benito Madonia (Naim, 2000)
- Live! (Naim, 2000)
- Touch Wood (Naim, 2003)
- Wot Italian? with Boothby Graffoe (2004)
- Tears of Joy (Naim, 2005)
- Heartplay with Charlie Haden (Naim, 2006)
- In Concert (Naim, 2007)
- Sketches of Africa (Antastic, 2012)
- Compared to What with Sarah Jane Morris (Fallen Angel/Antastic, 2016)
- Joy with AKA Trio (Bendigedig, 2019)
- Incanto with Benito Madonia and Giorgio Serci (2024)
- " Queendoms Unplugged" with Agadez (2025)
- " Storytellers" with Cenk Erdogan (2026)
