= Buell Kazee =

American singer

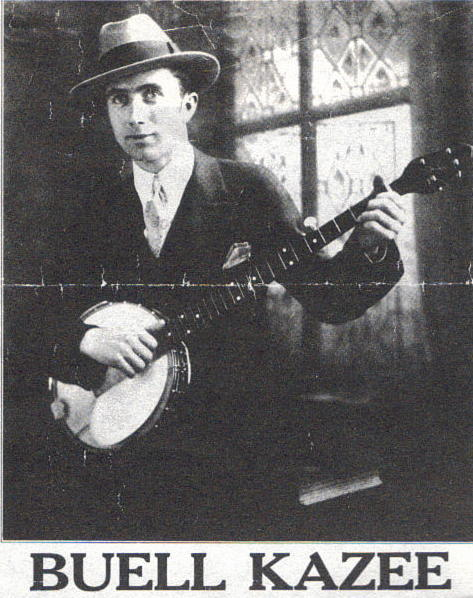
- Buell Kazee

Background information
- Born: August 29, 1900
- Origin: Magoffin County, Kentucky, U.S.
- Died: August 31, 1976 (aged 76)
- Genres: Country, folk
- Occupation(s): Singer, banjoist, songwriter
- Instrument: Banjo
- Years active: 1927–1960s

Buell Kazee (August 29, 1900 – August 31, 1976) was an American country and folk singer. He is considered one of the most successful folk musicians of the 1920s and experienced a career comeback during the American folk music revival of the 1960s due in part to his inclusion on the Anthology of American Folk Music.

== Early life ==
Buell Kazee was born at the foot of Burton Fork, Kentucky, a mountain in Magoffin County. By the age of five, Kazee found publicity playing banjo at church. After he graduated high school, he studied English, Greek and Latin at Georgetown College.

== Career ==
In 1927, Kazee received an inquiry from Brunswick Records, asking if he would consider recording in their studio in New York City. Kazee traveled to New York, and eventually signed with the label. His first record was "Roll On John" backed with "John Hardy". Over the next two years, backed by an assortment of New York musicians, he recorded 51 songs, including such hits as "Gray Lady," "The Sporting Bachelors," and "The Little Orphan Child." His greatest success was his rendition of "On Top Of Old Smoky".

Kazee's lyrics were often dominated by religious subjects, but also treated everyday problems of the working man. In the early 1930s, he moved to the Vocalion label. As the Depression worsened, Kazee recorded less and less, and eventually left the music business and worked for the next 22 years as the pastor of First Baptist Church in Morehead, Kentucky.

== Withdrawal and revival ==
After the Great Depression in the United States, Kazee performed only rarely and devoted himself entirely to the ministry, the profession that he had actually wanted to pursue since his teens. During the 1960s folk music boom, Kazee began a comeback and started to perform again. He made joint appearances with other former folk stars like Dock Boggs and Clarence Ashley and Doc Watson at the Newport Folk Festival. He also wrote and published three books.

Buell Kazee died on 31 August 1976 at age 76.

== Discography ==
=== Singles ===
Song titles	Catalog number	Notes
Brunswick
"Roll on John" / "John Hardy"	144	
"Rock Island" / "Old Whiskey Bill"	145	
"Darling Cora" / "East Virginia"	154	
"The Ship That's Sailing High on the Water" / "If You Love Your Mother"	155	
"The Roving Cowboy" / "The Little Mohee"	156	
"The Old Maid" / "The Sporting Bachelors"	157	
"Faded Coat of Blue" / "Don't Forget Me, Little Darlin'"	206	Recorded under the pseudonym of "Ray Lyncy"
"Snow Deer" / "Red Wing"	210	with Sookie Hobbs; Red Wing originally by Riley Puckett
"The Orphan Girl" / "Poor Little Orphan Boy"	211	
"The Cowboy's Farewell" / "Lady Gray"	212	
"The Wagoner's Lad" / "The Butcher's Boy (The Railroad Boy)"	213	
"The Dying Soldier" / "Short Life of Trouble"	214	
"Little Bessie" / "My Mother"	215	"Little Bessie" later covered by the Alabama Barnstomers
"In The Shadow of the Pines" / "You Taught Me How to Love"	216	
"Poor Boy Long Way from Home" / "You Are False but I'll Forgive You"	217	
"Married Girl's Troubles" / "Gamblin' Blues"	218	
"Steel-A-Goin' Down" / "The Hobo's Last Ride"	330	
"A Mountain Boy Makes His First Record" / "A Mountain Boy Makes His First Record, Pt. 2"	338	
"Toll the Bells" / "The Blind Man"	351	
"Roving Cowboy" / "Little Mohee"	436	
"The Wagoner's Lad" / "The Butcher's Boy (The Railroad Boy)"	437	
"Cowboy Trail" / "I'm Rolling Along"	481	
Vocalion
"In The Shadow of the Pines" / "You Taught Me How to Love Now You Teach Me to Forget"	5221	
"My Mother" / "Little Bessie"	5231	Brunswick 215

=== Albums ===
Year	Album title	Label	Catalog Number	Comments
1958	Buell Kazee Sings and Plays	Smithsonian Folkways Recordings
1978	Buell Kazee	June Appal Recordings	JA0009	Reissued in 2007
2005	Legendary Kentucky
