= In Angel City =

Studio album by Charlie Haden
- Released: October 1988
- Recorded: May 30–June 1, 1988
- Genre: Jazz
- Length: 61:43
- Label: Verve
- Producer: Hans Wendl

Charlie Haden chronology
Quartet West (1987)	In Angel City (1988)	Etudes (1988)

Quartet West chronology
Quartet West (1987)	In Angel City (1988)	Haunted Heart (1992)

In Angel City is an album by the American jazz bassist Charlie Haden's Quartet West, recorded in 1988 and released on the Verve label.

== Reception ==
The AllMusic review by Scott Yanow stated: "An excellent showcase for Haden in a straight-ahead setting and for Watts, whose passionate sound perfectly fits the band. Highly recommended".

Professional ratings
Review scores
Source	Rating
AllMusic	4/5 stars
The Penguin Guide to Jazz	3/4 stars

== Track listing ==
All compositions by Charlie Haden except as indicated

1. "Sunday at the Hillcrest" – 6:21
2. "First Song" – 6:57
3. "The Red Wind" (Pat Metheny) – 4:55
4. "Blue in Green" (Miles Davis, Bill Evans) – 7:16
5. "Alpha" (Ornette Coleman) – 6:27
6. "Live Your Dreams" (Ernie Watts) – 6:32
7. "Child's Play" – 3:06
8. "Fortune's Fame" (Vince Mendoza) – 8:09
9. "Tarantella" (Alan Broadbent) – 3:15 Bonus track on CD
10. "Lonely Woman" (Coleman) – 13:41 Bonus track on CD

- Recorded at Producers 1 & 2 in Los Angeles, California on May 30 – June 1, 1988

== Personnel ==
- Charlie Haden – bass
- Ernie Watts – tenor saxophone, shaker, synthesizer
- Alan Broadbent – piano
- Larance Marable – drums
- Alex Cline – drums, percussion (track 3)
