= Heart to Heart (Alan Broadbent album) =

Live album by Alan Broadbent
- Released: 2013
- Recorded: 2012
- Venue: Portland
- Genre: Jazz
- Length: 58:44
- Label: Chilly Bin

Heart to Heart is a solo piano album by Alan Broadbent. It was recorded in 2012 and released by Chilly Bin Records.

== Recording and music ==
The album of solo piano performances by Broadbent was recorded in concert in Portland in 2012. The album Lennie Tristano is an influence on some tracks, for the strict left-hand tempo that they feature. "Cherokee" is played at high speed; "Lonely Woman" "operates in a minor chord fog and goes through several permutations". "Now and Then" is played as a waltz.

== Release and reception ==
Heart to Heart was released by Chilly Bin Records in 2013. DownBeat, in a five-star review, wrote: "Like few other practicing keyboardists, Broadbent's playing on this tour de force truly fulfills the potential of the instrument as an orchestra in a box".

== Track listing ==
1. "Hello My Lovely" (Charlie Haden)
2. "Heart to Heart" (Alan Broadbent)
3. "Alone Together" (Arthur Schwartz)
4. "Now and Then" (Broadbent)
5. "Journey Home" (Broadbent)
6. "Blue in Green" (Bill Evans, Miles Davis)
7. "Love Is the Thing" (Broadbent)
8. "Lonely Woman" (Ornette Coleman)
9. "Cherokee" (Ray Noble)

== Personnel ==
- Alan Broadbent – piano
