= SteveIreneo! =

Studio album by Irene Kral with Al Cohn and His Orchestra
- Released: 1959
- Recorded: February 1959; New York City
- Genre: Vocal jazz
- Label: United Artists; UAL 3052/UAS 6052
- Producer: Jack Lewis

Irene Kral chronology
The Band and I (1958)	SteveIreneo! (1959)	Better Than Anything (1963)

SteveIreneo! is an album by vocalist Irene Kral performing songs written by Steve Allen with Al Cohn's Orchestra which was recorded in 1959 and originally released on the United Artists label.

Professional ratings
Review scores
Source	Rating
Allmusic	3/5 stars
DownBeat	4/5 stars

== Track listing ==
All compositions by Steve Allen except where noted.

1. "Too Late the Spring" (Alan Shulman, Steve Allen) – 2:21
2. "Run (Don't Walk)" (Hank Jones, Allen) – 2:24
3. "The Best Time of the Day" (Chubby Jackson, Allen) – 2:25
4. "Yes" (Pete Rugolo, Herman Saunders, Lloyd Luhham, Allen) 2:29
5. "There He Goes" – 2:47
6. "And Even Then" – 3:03
7. "Houseboat" (George Duning, Allen) – 3:00
8. "Cool Blue" (Neal Hefti, Allen) – 2:00
9. "What Is a Woman" – 2:28
10. "Spring Is Where You Are" – 2:50
11. "Impossible" – 2:56
12. "Pleasant Dreams" – 2:45

== Personnel ==
- Irene Kral – vocals
- Al Cohn – arranger, conductor
- Joe Newman – trumpet
- Urbie Green – trombone
- Eddie Caine – alto saxophone, flute
- Zoot Sims – tenor saxophone
- Danny Bank – baritone saxophone
- Jimmy Raney – guitar
- Hank Jones – piano
- Chet Amsterdam – bass
- Charlie Persip – drums
- Joe Venuto – percussion
