= The Private Collection =

Live album by Charlie Haden
- Released: January 2007 (Limited edition: 1994)
- Recorded: August 6, 1987 and April 4, 1988
- Venue: My Place, Santa Monica, CA and Webster University, St. Louis, MO
- Genre: Jazz
- Length: 146:27
- Label: Naim naimcd108

Charlie Haden chronology
Heartplay (2006)	The Private Collection (2007)	Rambling Boy (2008)

Quartet West chronology
The Art of the Song (1999)	The Private Collection (2007)	Sophisticated Ladies (2010)

The Private Collection is a live album by the American jazz bassist Charlie Haden's Quartet West recorded at performances in 1987 and 1988 and released on the Naim label.

== Reception ==
Professional ratings
Review scores
Source	Rating
The Penguin Guide to Jazz Recordings	3.5/4 stars

The Allmusic review by Scott Yanow stated, "Although one would not have necessarily predicted this direction for Charlie Haden's music in 1970, it has worked out quite well. This well-recorded two-fer features Haden's Quartet West at its best". All About Jazz observed "The Private Collection finds Haden and Quartet West at its true best, with material spanning four decades but still sounding, twenty years later, as if it had been written yesterday".

== Track listing ==
All compositions by Charlie Haden except as indicated

Disc One

1. "Hermitage" (Pat Metheny) - 12:45
2. "Passport" (Charlie Parker) - 15:34
3. "Misery" (Tony Scott) - 8:10
4. "Nardis" (Miles Davis) - 13:00
5. "Segment" (Parker) - 11:00
6. "Farmer's Trust" (Metheny) - 7:18
7. "Etudes" (Johann Sebastian Bach) - 3:30
- Recorded at Charlie Haden's 50th Birthday Concert at At My Place in Santa Monica, CA on August 6, 1987

Disc Two

1. "Bay City" - 13:28
2. "Farmer's Trust" (Metheny) - 9:21
3. "Lonely Woman" (Ornette Coleman) - 22:51
4. "Silence" - 8:54
5. "Body and Soul" (Edward Heyman, Robert Sour, Frank Eyton, Johnny Green) - 8:20
6. "Visa" (Parker) - 12:16
- Recorded at Webster University in St. Louis, MO on April 4, 1988

== Personnel ==
Musicians

- Charlie Haden – bass
- Ernie Watts – saxophones
- Alan Broadbent – piano
- Billy Higgins – drums (Disc One)
- Paul Motian – drums (Disc Two)

Production

- Ken Christianson – engineer (recording, remastering), photography
- Dave Dever – editing
- Yuki Chong – design
- Anna Tooth – photography
- Charlie Haden – liner notes
