= The Band and I =

Studio album by Irene Kral and the Herb Pomeroy Orchestra
- Released: 1959
- Recorded: November 1958; RCA Studios, New York City
- Genre: Vocal jazz
- Length: 31:39
- Label: United Artists; UAL 4016/UAS 5016
- Producer: Jack Lewis

Irene Kral chronology
The Band and I (1959)	SteveIreneo! (1959)

Herb Pomeroy chronology
Band in Boston (1958)	The Band and I (1958)	Pramlatta's Hips (1980)

The Band and I is an album by vocalist Irene Kral performing with Herb Pomeroy's Orchestra which was recorded in 1958 and originally released on the United Artists label.

== Reception ==
Professional ratings
Review scores
Source	Rating
AllMusic	4/5 stars

The Allmusic review by Jason Ankeney stated "The Band and I pairs Irene Kral with Ernie Wilkins and Al Cohn, whose energetic, robust arrangements capture a dimension of the singer rarely glimpsed on record – upbeat and persuasive, with little of the spectral melancholy that hangs over her later, more familiar sessions. The titular backing unit in question, led by trumpeter Herb Pomeroy, expertly bridges the gap between traditional big band and modern-era jazz, creating a soulful, lightly swinging showcase that inspires Kral to deliver some of her most appealing performances".

== Track listing ==
1. "I'd Know You Anywhere" (Jimmy McHugh, Johnny Mercer) – 2:14
2. "Detour Ahead" (Herb Ellis, Johnny Frigo, Lou Carter) – 3:43
3. "Comes Love" (Sam H. Stept, Lew Brown, Charles Tobias) – 2:36
4. "Everybody Knew But Me" (Irving Berlin) – 2:01
5. "Lazy Afternoon" (Jerome Moross, John La Touche) – 2:56
6. "What's Right for You" (Bernle Gluckman, Thomas A. Goodman, Hubert Doris) – 3:01
7. "I Let a Song Go Out of My Heart" (Duke Ellington, Irving Mills, Henry Nemo, John Redmond) – 2:46
8. "Memphis in June" (Hoagy Carmichael, Paul Francis Webster) – 2:58
9. "This Little Love" (Tommy Wolf, Fran Landesman) – 2:07
10. "The Night We Called It a Day" (Matt Dennis, Tom Adair) – 2:32
11. "It Isn't So Good" (Wolf, Landesman) – 2:32
12. "Something to Remember You By" (Howard Dietz, Arthur Schwartz) – 2:12

== Personnel ==
- Irene Kral – vocals
- Herb Pomeroy – bandleader, trumpet
- Lenny Johnson, Augie Ferretti, Nick Capezuto, Bill Berry – trumpet
- Gene DiStasio, Bill Legan, Joe Ciavardone – trombone
- Dave Chapman, Charlie Mariano – alto saxophone
- Varty Haroutunian, Joe Carusso – tenor saxophone
- Jimmy Mosher – baritone saxophone
- Ray Santisi – piano
- John Neves – bass
- Jimmy Zitano – drums
- Al Cohn (tracks 2–5, 8 & 12), Ernie Wilkins (tracks 1, 6, 7 & 9–11) – arranger
