= June Appal Recordings =

- Founded: 1974
- Founder: Appalshop
- Genre: Appalachian, old time, bluegrass, country, Americana, roots
- Country of origin: U.S.
- Location: Whitesburg, Kentucky
- Official website: www.appalshop.org

June Appal Recordings is a record label that was founded by Jack Wright and established by Appalshop to record and distribute music of and from central Appalachia. Artists with June Appal include Buell Kazee, Morgan Sexton, Lee Sexton, Carla Gover, and Nimrod Workman. June Appal distributes compilation recordings taken from the annual Seedtime on the Cumberland festival in Whitesburg, Kentucky.

== Catalog ==
TITLE	PERFORMER	RELEASE DATE	FORMAT	CATALOG #
Passin' Thru the Garden	Nimrod Workman	1974	LP	JA0001
New Wood	Si Kahn	1975	LP	JA0002
How Can I Keep From Singing?	John McCutcheon	1975	Cassette/LP	JA0003
Grandfather's Greatest Hits, Vol. I	Roadside Theater	1976		JA0004
Aunt Dinah's Quilting Party	New River Boys	1975		JA0005
Brown Lung Cotton Mill Blues	Mountain Musicians Cooperative	1975	LP	JA0006
Deep in Tradition	Tommy Hunter	1975	LP	JA0007
The Eagle and the Sparrow	Jon Sundell	1976	LP	JA0008
Buell Kazee	Buell Kazee	1978	CD/LP	JA0009
Red Wing	I. D. Stamper	1977	LP	JA0010
Ancient Creek	Gurney Norman	1976	LP	JA0011
They Can't Put It Back	Mike Kline and Rich Kirby	1977	LP	JA0012
Ballads for the Sad Café	Jack Wright	Unreleased	Unreleased	JA0013
The Wind That Shakes the Barley	John McCutcheon	1977	LP	JA0014
Vocal & Instrumental Blend	Plank Road String Band	1978	LP	JA0015
Banish Misfortune	Dalglish and Larsen	1978	Cassette/LP	JA0016
Cold & Lonesome on a Train	Sparky Rucker	1977	LP	JA0017
For My Friends of Song	Betty Smith	1977	Cassette/LP	JA0018
65 Years of Irish Music	Michael J. Kennedy	1977	LP	JA0019
Been a Long Time Traveling	Addie Graham	1978	CD/LP	JA0020
Green Rocky Road	Guy Carawan	1977	LP	JA0021
From the Depths of My Soul	Earl Gilmore	1977	LP	JA0022
Sycamore Tea	Dutch Cove Old Time String Band	1978	Cassette/LP	JA0023
Mountain Swing	Luke Smathers	1978	LP	JA0024
Mountain State Music	Andrew F. Boarman	1978	LP	JA0025
The First of Autumn	Dalglish and Larsen	1978	Cassette/LP	JA0026
Shuffle Rag	Andy Cohen	1980	LP	JA0027
From Earth to Heaven	Wry Straw	1978	Cassette/LP	JA0028
Jubilee	Guy Carawan	1979	LP	JA0029
Road to Home	Marion Sumner	1980	LP	JA0030
Dixie Highway Sign	Robin and Linda Williams	1979	Cassette/LP	JA0031
In Full Swing	Luke Smathers String Band	1981	LP	JA0032
Last Chance	The Home Folks	1979	LP	JA0033
It's Never Too Late	Larry Sparks & The Lonesome Ramblers	1980	LP	JA0034
Look at the People	Pigmeat Jarrett	1979	LP	JA0035
Mountain Tales	Roadside Theater	1980	LP	JA0036
Sweet Rivers	Jean Ritchie	1981	LP	JA0037
It Just Suits Me	David Holt	1981	LP	JA0038
Cities of Gold	Ron Short	1981	LP	JA0039
Harmony	Robin & Linda Williams	1981	LP	JA0040
Precious Memories	Bluegrass Meditations	1982	LP	JA0041
Hits From Home	Tom Bledsoe & Rich Kirby	1982	LP	JA0042
Last Chance Rider	Bob Martin	1982	LP	JA0043
12-string Moonrise	John Stanfield	1983	LP	JA0044
Dillon Bustin's Almanac	Dillon Bustin	1983	LP	JA0045
Fields Where We Once Played	The Payroll Boys	1983	LP	JA0046
Wild Hog In the Woods	Fred & Jenny Armstrong-Park	1984	LP	JA0047
Hills & Hollers: Hammered Dulcimer And Guitar Duets	Jim Miller	1984	LP	JA0048
Relics & Treasure	Charlie Osborne	1985	LP	JA0049
Life of the Party	Metropolitan Blues All Stars	1986	LP	JA0050
Whoa Mule	Lee Sexton	1989	LP	JA0051
Jack Alive!	Ray Hicks	1989	LP	JA0052
Trying Times	Metropolitan Blues All Stars	1988	LP	JA0053
(I've Got The Blues For My Kentucky Home)	Buzzard Rock String Band	1988	LP	JA0054
Rock Dust	Morgan Sexton	1989	LP	JA0055
Blizard Train	Ralph Blizard & the New Southern Ramblers	1989	LP	JA0056
Dusty Miller	Dusty Miller	1989	LP	JA0057
Galleynipper	J.P. And Annadeene Fraley	1990	Cassette	JA0058
Seedtime on the Cumberland Vol. II	Various Artists	1990	Cassette	JA0059
Signs & Wonders	Kay Justice & Ginny Hawker	1990	Cassette	JA0060
Fiddle Ditty	Owen 'Snake' Chapman	1990	Cassette	JA0061
Carryin' On: Jack Tales for Children of All Ages	Orville Hicks	1990	Cassette	JA0062
Oso Special	Goose Creek Symphony	1990	CD	JA0063
100 Years Farther On	Uncle Charlie Osborne	1990	Cassette	JA0064
In the Land of Melody	Wade & Julia Mainer	1992		JA0065
Shady Grove	Morgan Sexton	1992		JA0066
Seedtime On The Cumberland Sampler 1990–91	Various Artists	1992	CD	JA0067
Heritage	James Still & Randy Wilson	1992		JA0068
Come All You Tenderhearted	Ginny Hawker & Kay Justice	1993	CD	JA0069
Echoes From The Mountainside (A Festival Anthology)	Various Artists	1993	CD	JA0070
Finley J. Brewer, Sr. From Roan Mountain, TN	Pap Brewer With Gary Brewer & The Kentucky Ramblers	1994	CD	JA0071
Hush, My Restless Soul	Carla Gover	1995	CD	JA0072
The Banjo Still Rings	Phil Sexton	1995		JA0073
Seedtime on the Cumberland Vol. III	Various Artists	1998	CD	JA0074
Southern Melody	Odus Maggard	1995	CD	JA0075
The 5th Generation	Gary Brewer and Phil Sexton	1997	Cassette/CD	JA0076
Banjer Days	Various Artists	1999	Cassette/CD	JA0077
Gems	Lily May Ledford	2000	Cassette/CD	JA0078
Last Possum Up the Tree	George Gibson	2000	Cassette/CD	JA0079
Whoa Mule (Reissue)	Lee Sexton	2001	CD	JA0080
Butter Beans	Papa Joe Smiddy	2001	CD	JA0081
All Join Hands! Traditional Music for Square Dancing	Cowan Creek Mountain Music School	2005	CD	JA0083
Cold Icy Mountain	Brett Ratliff	2008	CD	JA0084
The June Appal Recordings	Uncle Charlie Osborne	2008	CD	JA0085
When The Whistle Blew	Rich And The Po' Folk	2010	CD	JA0086
Glory to the Meeting House	Charlie Stamper	2014	CD	JA0087
Crossing the Mountain Line	Kevin Howard	TBD	CD/LP	JA0088
The Very Day I'm Gone – Songs of Addie Graham	Various Artists	2015	CD	JA0090
Headed Back	Nate Polly	2018	CD/LP	JA0091
Johnny Come Along	John Harrod	2019	CD	JA0092
The Gospel	The Local Honeys	2019	CD/LP	JA0093
Apex Pollinator	Everyone Lives Everyone Wins	2022	Digital	JA0094
Whitesburg KY	Brett Ratliff	2021	Digital/LP/CD	JA0095
Hobe	Matthew Stallard	2022	Digital/CD	JA0096
The Tiny Thread That Ties Us All Together	Don Rogers	2021	Digital/CD	JA0097
Don't Get Dead: Pandemic Folk Songs by the Cornelius Eady Trio	Cornelius Eady Trio	2021	Digital/LP/CD	JA0098
Revenant	Murphy Campbell	2006	Digital/LP/CD	JA0104

== Other Recordings ==
TITLE	PERFORMER	RELEASE DATE	Label	Misc
Dances From Appalachia	Berea College Christmas Dance School	1976	Not on label	Recorded at June Appal Studio
Times In Between	Maureen Linneman Eaton	1977	Sourwood Mountain Recordings	Recorded at June Appal Studio
Snow On The Roof, Fire In The Furnace	Cincinnati Area Traditional Musicians	1979	June Appal Recordings	No catalog number.

== See also ==
- Appalshop
- List of record labels
