= Cowan Powers and his Family Band =

American string band

Fiddlin' Powers and Family
- Origin: Scott County, Virginia, U.S.
- Genres: String band, old-time music
- Years active: 1920s, 1970s
- Labels: Victor Talking Machine Company; Edison Records; Okeh Records
- Past members: James Cowan Powers (fiddle); Matilda Lambert (banjo); Charles Powers (banjo); Orpha Powers (mandolin); Carrie Powers (guitar); Ada Powers (ukulele)

Fiddlin' Powers and Family was a Virginia string band from the 1920s, considered pioneers in early country music. They were the first family string band to make a commercial record (1924). The band consisted of Cowan Powers and his children, Charles, Orpha, Carrie and Ada. Cowan also played with his wife, Matilda, until her death in 1916.

== A career ==
=== Recording ===
Record companies of the time were trying to get "old time" or "hill country" music to sell, and tried using professional musicians such as Vernon Dalhart to imitate the sound. When it became clear the customers wanted the "real thing" the companies sought musicians to travel from the south to the recording studios in New York and Chicago.

The Powers family, who were based in Scott County, Southwest Virginia, made records with Victor Talking Machine Company, Edison Records and Okeh Records. They recorded at least 26 songs, of which 15 were issued. Their recording of Old Joe Clark in 1924 was the third best selling album for that year.

=== Live performances ===
They performed live in "the Carolinas, Virginia, West Virginia, Kentucky, and perhaps a dozen other states". They played dances. At the time of the Bristol Sessions they were performing live over the radio, WOPI in Bristol, Virginia, and were among the first country acts to do so.

=== The band resurrected ===
The daughters restarted the band in the 1970s, with Orpha's husband Eugene D. Ireson.

== Recording history ==
=== Victor 1924 ===
The Powers family did a trial recording with Victor Recordings in New York City, August 8, 1924, recording Way Down to Georgia.

They started recording records for Victor, doing six records 10 days later on August 18. Of those recordings, three records were issued, The Little Old Log Cabin in the Lane, Old Joe Clark, and Sour Wood Mountains.

They continued recording the next day, August 19. They recorded eleven songs of which five were issued, Patty on the Turnpike, Callahan's Reel, Sugar in the Gourd, Cripple Creek, and Ida Red.

=== Edison 1925 ===
The family recorded with Edison in 1925, October 2, 3, 6 and 7 in New York City. Seven of the nine that they recorded were issued, Old Joe Clark, Sour Wood Mountains, Ida Red, Cripple Creek, Cluck Old Hen, Rocky Road to Dinah's House, and Sugar in the Gourd.

Charlie Powers, Cowan's son, also recorded a song on his own with Edison, Wild and Reckless Hobo.

=== Okeh 1927 ===
The last recording session was for Okeh records in Winston–Salem, North Carolina, September 28, 1927. Within three years the band would be no more, as the girls married and began families. They recorded six songs, of which four were issued, Did You Ever See the Devil, Uncle Joe?, Old Molly Hair, Old Virginia Reel — Part 1, and Old Virginia Reel — Part 2.

== Ukulele in old-time music ==
There has been some speculation as to the origin of the ukulele in old time music. Those who are fans have pointed out stars who used the instrument, including Fiddlin' Powers and Family, Da Costa Woltz's Southern Broadcasters, Ernest V. Stoneman, Walter Smith and Friends, The Blankenship Family, The Hillbillies, The Hilltop Singers, and Jimmie Rodgers.

When Ada Powers took up the ukulele in the 20s, there was a craze for Hawaiian music on the national scene, which had young people taking up the instrument. Also there was sheet music being produced for the ukulele, which has been speculatively called a reason that many rural people took up the instrument.

Ada Powers was the Ukulele player in Fiddlin' Powers and Family. Her playing can be heard on their music, especially The Virginia Reel, part 1 in which all the family members had solos.
