= Copper Creek, Virginia =

Unincorporated community in Virginia, US

Coordinates: 36.827757°N 82.253412°W

Copper Creek is an unincorporated community located in Russell County, Virginia, United States.

== Notable people ==
- Country music legend Sara Carter of the Carter Family was born in Copper Creek.
- Appalachian music man Uncle Charlie Osborne lived there.
