= Where Is Love? (Irene Kral album) =

Studio album by Irene Kral
- Released: 1975
- Recorded: December 1974
- Studio: Wally Heider Studios, Los Angeles, CA
- Genre: Vocal jazz
- Length: 39:03
- Label: Choice; CRS 1012
- Producer: Joe Burnett

Irene Kral chronology
| Wonderful Life (1965) | Where Is Love? (1975) | Kral Space (1977) |

Where Is Love? is an album by vocalist Irene Kral performing with pianist Alan Broadbent that was recorded in 1974 and originally released on the Choice label and rereleased by Candid on CD in 1996.

== Reception ==
Professional ratings
Review scores
| Source | Rating |
|---|---|
| Allmusic | 4.5/5 stars |
| The Rolling Stone Jazz Record Guide | 5/5 stars |

The Allmusic review by Scott Yanow stated: "This is a haunting program, Irene Kral's best; it sticks in one's memory long afterwards and can be considered one of the finest sets of ballads ever recorded. Essential music". In JazzTimes Joe Seigal called the album "her creative breakthrough and, sadly, her artistic testament" and "A vocal classic". On All About Jazz Michael P. Gladstone said: "With just a spare piano accompaniment, the vocalist tackles nine very well chosen ballads that are meant not only to entertain us but to advise us about the compositions of singer-songwriters like Bob Dorough, Dave Frishberg and Blossom Dearie. ... Her unhurried and moving delivery opens up the lyrical content of show tunes like the title song from Oliver or Leslie Bricusse's 'When I Look In Your Eyes.'"

== Track listing ==
1. "I Like You, You're Nice" (Blossom Dearie) – 3:09
2. "When I Look in Your Eyes" (Leslie Bricusse) – 3:38
3. "A Time for Love/Small World" (Johnny Mandel, Paul Francis Webster/Jule Styne, Stephen Sondheim) – 6:31
4. "Love Came on Stealthy Fingers" (Bob Dorough) – 3:10
5. "Never Let Me Go" (Ray Evans, Jay Livingston) – 4:36
6. "Spring Can Really Hang You up the Most" (Fran Landesman, Tommy Wolf) – 5:03
7. "Lucky to Be Me/Some Other Time" (Leonard Bernstein, Betty Comden, Adolph Green) – 6:44
8. "Where Is Love?" (Lionel Bart) – 4:22
9. "Don't Look Back" (Mandel, Kaye Dunham) – 3:09

== Personnel ==
- Irene Kral – vocals
- Alan Broadbent – piano
