= Lobata, West Virginia =

- Unincorporated community
- Location within West Virginia Location within the United States
- Coordinates: 37°38′55″N 82°11′20″W
- Country: United States
- State: West Virginia
- County: Mingo
- Elevation: 689 ft (210 m)
- Time zone: UTC-5 (Eastern (EST))
  - Summer (DST): UTC-4 (EDT)
- ZIP code: 25677
- Area codes: 304 & 681
- GNIS feature ID: 1554980

Lobata is an unincorporated community in Mingo County, West Virginia, United States. Lobata is located on the Tug Fork and West Virginia Route 49, 5.2 miles (8.4 km) east-southeast of Williamson. Lobata had a post office, which closed on July 1, 1989.
