= Sergio Mihanovich =

Argentine jazz pianist, singer and composer (1937–2012)

Sergio Mihanovich (May 8, 1937, in Buenos Aires – May 7, 2012) was an Argentine jazz pianist, singer and composer. Of Croatian and Serbian descent, he was the uncle of Argentine singer and actress Sandra Mihanovich.

His best known composition is "Sometime Ago", which has been recorded instrumentally by Cannonball Adderley, Bill Evans, Art Farmer, Stan Getz, Joe Pass, George Shearing, Clark Terry, and numerous others. There are also vocal versions by singers including June Christy, Mark Murphy, Roseanna Vitro, Norma Winstone, and Irene Kral.

Mihanovich died on 7 May 2012 in Buenos Aires due to cancer. He was 74.
