= Quartet West =

Studio album by Charlie Haden
- Released: June 1987
- Recorded: December 22 and 23, 1986
- Genre: Jazz
- Length: 61:43
- Label: Verve
- Producer: Hans Wendl

Charlie Haden chronology
Ballad of the Fallen (1983)	Quartet West (1987)	In Angel City (1988)

Quartet West chronology
Quartet West (1987)	In Angel City (1988)

Quartet West is an album by the American jazz bassist Charlie Haden, recorded in 1986 and released on the Verve label.

== Reception ==
The AllMusic review by Stacia Proefrock stated: "While the album may not be stretching many boundaries stylistically, this format does little to dilute Haden's impressive performances, and his love for this material is made obvious with his intricate arrangements".

Professional ratings
Review scores
Source	Rating
AllMusic	5/5 stars
The Penguin Guide to Jazz Recordings	3.5/4 stars

== Track listing ==
All compositions by Charlie Haden except as indicated

1. "Hermitage" (Pat Metheny) – 7:59
2. "Body and Soul" (Frank Eyton, Johnny Green, Edward Heyman, Robert Sour) – 6:19
3. "The Good Life" (Ornette Coleman) – 4:39
4. "In the Moment" – 6:06
5. "Bay City" – 6:46
6. "My Foolish Heart" (Ned Washington, Victor Young) – 6:47
7. "Passport" (Charlie Parker) – 4:45
8. "Taney County" – 7:39
9. "The Blessing" (Coleman) – 5:50
10. "Passion Flower" (Billy Strayhorn) – 4:53

- Recorded at Producers 1 & 2 in Los Angeles, California on December 22 and 23, 1986

== Personnel ==
- Charlie Haden – bass
- Ernie Watts – soprano saxophone, alto saxophone, tenor saxophone
- Alan Broadbent – piano
- Billy Higgins – drums
