= Tumbez, Virginia =

Unincorporated community in Virginia, United States

Tumbez, Virginia, is a small cluster of homes and farms at a fork in the road in the southwestern edge of Russell County in the U.S. state of Virginia. It was the home of mountain music fiddler Uncle Charlie Osborne.

Tumbez is located at 36°46′05″N 82°15′57″W.
