= Alan Broadbent =

New Zealand jazz pianist and arranger/composer

Alan Broadbent MNZM
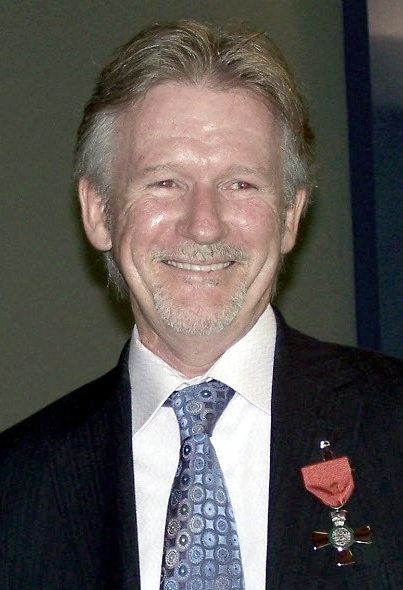
- Broadbent in 2008

Background information
- Born: Alan Leonard Broadbent; 23 April 1947 (age 79); Auckland, New Zealand
- Genre: Jazz
- Occupations: Musician, arranger, composer
- Instrument: Piano
- Years active: 1974–present
- Labels: Granite, Trend, Concord Jazz
- Website: alanbroadbent.com

Alan Leonard Broadbent MNZM (born 23 April 1947) is a New Zealand jazz pianist, arranger, and composer known for his work with artists such as Sue Raney, Charlie Haden, Woody Herman, Chet Baker, Irene Kral, Sheila Jordan, Natalie Cole, Warne Marsh, Bud Shank, and many others.

== Early life ==
Born in Auckland in 1947, Broadbent studied piano and music theory in New Zealand, and in 1966 went to the United States to study at the Berklee College of Music.

== Later life and career ==
During the 1990s, Broadbent recorded on Natalie Cole's album Unforgettable... with Love, then became her pianist and conductor for the tour. His arrangement for her video "When I Fall in Love" won the Grammy Award for Best Orchestral Arrangement Accompanying a Vocal. During the 1980s and 1990s, he recorded with Charlie Haden's Quartet West. Around this time he won a Grammy Award for his arrangement of Leonard Bernstein's "Lonely Town" that was recorded by Shirley Horn. He wrote arrangements for Glenn Frey's album After Hours and for Paul McCartney's album Kisses on the Bottom. He has worked as conductor for Diana Krall.

In the 2008 Queen's Birthday Honours, Broadbent was appointed a Member of the New Zealand Order of Merit, for services to jazz.

In the November 2013 issue of Down Beat magazine, his solo piano album Heart to Heart received a five-star rating.

== Discography ==
=== As leader/co-leader ===
| Year recorded | Title | Label | Year released | Personnel/Notes |
|---|---|---|---|---|
| 1979? | Palette | Ode · Granite Music | 1979 | With big band |
| 1981 | Continuity | Revelation | 1983 | Co-lead Duo, with Putter Smith (bass) |
| 1984 | Song of Home | Kiwi Pacific | 1984 | Trio, with Andy Brown (bass), Frank Gibson Jr. (drums) |
| 1985 | Further Down the Road | Tartar | 1986 | Trio, Andy Brown (bass), Frank Gibson Jr, (drums) |
| 1986? | Everything I Love | Discovery | 1986 | Trio, with Putter Smith (bass), Frank Gibson Jr. (drums) |
| 1987 | Another Time | Trend | 1987 | Trio, with Putter Smith (bass), Frank Gibson Jr. (drums) |
| 1989 | Away from You | Trend | 1990 | Trio, with Putter Smith (bass), Frank Gibson Jr. (drums) |
| 1990? | Over the Fence | Ode | 1990 | Trio, with Putter Smith (bass), Frank Gibson Jr. (drums) |
| 1991? | Fine and Dandy | Ode | 1991 | Quartet, with George Chisholm (trumpet, flugelhorn), Andy Brown (bass), Frank Gibson Jr. (drums) |
| 1991 | Live at Maybeck Recital Hall, Volume Fourteen | Concord Jazz | 1991 | Solo piano; in concert |
| 1993 | Concord Duo Series, Volume Four | Concord Jazz | 1993 | Co-lead Duo, with Gary Foster (tenor sax, alto sax) |
| 1995 | Pacific Standard Time | Concord Jazz | 1995 | Trio, with Putter Smith (bass), Frank Gibson Jr. (drums) |
| 1996 | Personal Standards | Concord Jazz | 1997 | Trio, with Putter Smith (bass), Frank Gibson Jr. (drums); Grammy Nomination for Best Instrumental Composition "Every Time I Think of You" |
| 2002 | You and the Night and the Music | King/Paddle Wheel · A440 Music | 2003 | Trio, with Brian Bromberg (bass), Joe LaBarbera (drums); Grammy Nomination for Best Jazz Improvised Solo "What's New" |
| 2004? | 'Round Midnight | KIng/Paddle Wheel | 2004 | Trio, with Brian Bromberg (bass), Joe LaBarbera (drums); Grammy Nomination for Best Improvised Solo "Round Midnight" |
| 2005? | With Strings | King/Paddle Wheel | 2005 | With Strings |
| 2006? | Every Time I Think of You | King · Artistry Music | 2006 | With Brian Bromberg (bass), Kendall Kay (drums), The Tokyo Strings |
| 2009? | Together Again | Ode | 2009 | Trio, with Putter Smith (bass), Frank Gibson Jr. (drums) |
| 2009? | Moment's Notice | Chilly Bin | 2009 | Trio, with Putter Smith (bass), Kendall Kay (drums) |
| 2010 | Live at Giannelli Square, Vol. 1 | Chilly Bin | 2010 | Trio, with Putter Smith (bass), Kendall Kay (drums); Grammy Nomination for Best Jazz Improvised Solo "Solar" |
| 2012? | Live at Giannelli Square 2 | Chilly Bin | 2012 | Trio, with Putter Smith (bass), Kendall Kay (drums) |
| 2012 | Heart to Heart | Chilly Bin | 2013 | Solo piano; in concert |
| 2013 | Just One of Those Things | Edition Longplay | 2014 | Solo piano; in concert; limited edition LP |
| 2014? | America the Beautiful | Jan Matthies | 2014 | with the NDR Bigband |
| 2015 | Developing Story | Eden River | 2017 | With Harvie S (bass), Peter Erskine (drums), London Metropolitan Orchestra |
| 2015– 2016 | Songbook | Roomspin | 2017 | Co-led with Georgia Mancio (vocals), with Oli Hayhurst (bass), Dave Ohm (drums, percussion) |

=== As sideman or arranger ===
With Natalie Cole

- Unforgettable... with Love (Elektra, 1991)
- Take a Look (Elektra, 1993)
- Holly and Ivy (Elektra, 1994)
- Stardust (Elektra, 1996)
- Ask a Woman Who Knows (Verve, 2002)
- Still Unforgettable (DMI/Atco, 2008)

With Michael Feinstein

- Isn't It Romantic (Elektra, 1988)
- The M.G.M. Album (Elektra, 1989)
- Such Sweet Sorrow (Atlantic, 1995)

With Charlie Haden

- Quartet West (Verve, 1987)
- In Angel City (Verve, 1988)
- Haunted Heart (Verve, 1991)
- Always Say Goodbye (Verve, 1993)
- Now Is the Hour (Verve, 1995)
- The Art of the Song (Verve, 1999)
- The Private Collection (Naim, 2000)
- American Dreams (Verve, 2002)
- Sophisticated Ladies (EmArcy, 2010)

With Scott Hamilton

- Scott Hamilton with Strings (Concord Jazz, 1993)
- Christmas Love Song (Concord Jazz, 1997)
- Late Night Christmas Eve (Concord Jazz, 1997)

With Woody Herman

- Brand New (Fantasy, 1971)
- Woody (Cadet, 1971)
- Giant Steps (Fantasy, 1973)
- Thundering Herd (Fantasy, 1974)
- Children of Lima (Fantasy, 1975)
- Herd at Montreux (Fantasy, 1975)
- Woody and Friends at the Monterey Jazz Festival (Concord Jazz, 1979)

With Diana Krall

- Why Should I Care (Verve, 1999)
- Turn Up the Quiet (Verve, 2017)
- This Dream of You (Verve, 2020)

With Irene Kral

- Where Is Love? (Choice, 1974)
- Kral Space (Catalyst, 1977)
- Gentle Rain (Choice, 1978)

With Shelly Manne

- Double Jazz Quartet at Carmelo's (Trend, 1981)
- Double Jazz Quartet at Carmelo's Vol. 2 (Trend, 1982)

With Jane Monheit

- In the Sun (N-Coded, 2002)
- Live at the Rainbow Room (N-Coded, 2003)

With Lee Ritenour

- Stolen Moments (GRP, 1990)
- Wes Bound (GRP, 1992)

With Bud Shank

- Crystal Comments (Concord Jazz, 1980)
- Serious Swingers (Contemporary, 1987)

With others

- 1975 Percy Faith, Summer Place '76 (Columbia)
- 1977 Don Menza, First Flight (Catalyst)
- 1978 Bill Berry, Shortcake (Concord Jazz)
- 1979 Don Rader, Wallflower (Discovery)
- 1979 Barbra Streisand, Wet (Columbia)
- 1981 Jack Sheldon, Playin' It Straight (RealTime)
- 1983 Warne Marsh, Warne Marsh Meets Gary Foster (Eastworld)
- 1987 Charlie Shoemake, Satin Nights (Blackhawk)
- 1987 Bob Brookmeyer, Oslo (Concord Jazz)
- 1990 Charles McPherson, Follow the Bouncing Ball (Discovery)
- 1991 David Byrne, The Forest (Warner Bros.)
- 1992 Sue Raney, In Good Company (Discovery)
- 1992 Shirley Horn, Here's to Life (Verve)
- 1993 Sheila Jordan, Heart Strings (Muse)
- 1994 Mel Tormé Without a Word of Warning (Concord Jazz)
- 1994 Toots Thielemans, East Coast West Coast (Private Music)
- 1994 Kenny Rankin, Professional Dreamer (Private Music)
- 1994 Karrin Allyson, Sweet Home Cookin' (Concord Jazz)
- 1995 Eddie Daniels, The Five Seasons (Cachet)
- 1997 Marian McPartland, Silent Pool (Concord Jazz)
- 1998 Ann Hampton Callaway, This Christmas (Concord Jazz)
- 1999 Diane Schuur, Music Is My Life (Atlantic)
- 2000 Sheila Jordan, From the Heart (32 Jazz)
- 2000 Lee Konitz, More Live-Lee (Milestone)
- 2004 Linda Ronstadt, Hummin' to Myself (Verve)
- 2004 Renee Olstead, Reneé Olstead (Reprise)
- 2005 Rod Stewart, The Great American Songbook (J)
- 2005 Steve Tyrell, The Songs of Sinatra (Hollywood)
- 2009 Bob Florence, Legendary (Mama)
- 2010 Hilary Kole, You Are There: Duets (Justin Time)
- 2011 Seth MacFarlane, Music Is Better Than Words (Universal Republic)
- 2016 Kristin Chenoweth, The Art of Elegance (Concord)
- 2020 Pat Metheny, From This Place (Nonesuch)

== See also ==
- List of music arrangers
