= WMMT (FM) =

- Whitesburg, Kentucky; United States
- Frequency: 88.7 MHz
- Branding: Mountain Community Public Radio; Real People Radio; Possum Radio; The Non-Industrial Giant in the Mountains

Programming
- Format: Community radio

Ownership
- Owner: Appalshop, Incorporated

Technical information
- Licensing authority: FCC
- Facility ID: 2476
- Class: C1
- ERP: 1,000 watts (horiz.); 15,000 watts (vert.)
- HAAT: 448 meters (1,470 ft)
- Transmitter coordinates: 37°6′38″N 82°44′15″W

Links
- Public license information: Public file; LMS
- Webcast: Listen live
- Website: wmmt.org

WMMT (88.7 FM) is a radio station licensed to Whitesburg, Kentucky, United States. The station is currently owned by Appalshop, Incorporated.

== 2022 Kentucky floods ==
The station was damaged during the 2022 floods.

== Translators ==
In addition to the main station, WMMT is relayed by an additional seven translators to widen its broadcast area.

Call sign	Frequency	City of license	FID	ERP (W)	Class	FCC info
W270BS	101.9 FM	Harlan, Kentucky	2477	10	D	LMS
W207AO	89.3 FM	Paintsville, Kentucky	2471	10	D	LMS
W207BV	89.3 FM	Pikeville, Kentucky	2479	10	D	LMS
W208BG	89.5 FM	Prestonsburg, Kentucky	2473	90	D	LMS
W201AJ	88.1 FM	Big Stone Gap, Virginia	2480	90	D	LMS
W201AI	88.1 FM	Coeburn, Virginia	2472	90	D	LMS
W216BO	91.1 FM	Hansonville, Virginia	92652	10	D	LMS

== See also ==
- Appalshop
- List of community radio stations in the United States
