= Bobby Troup =

American actor and musician (1918–1999)

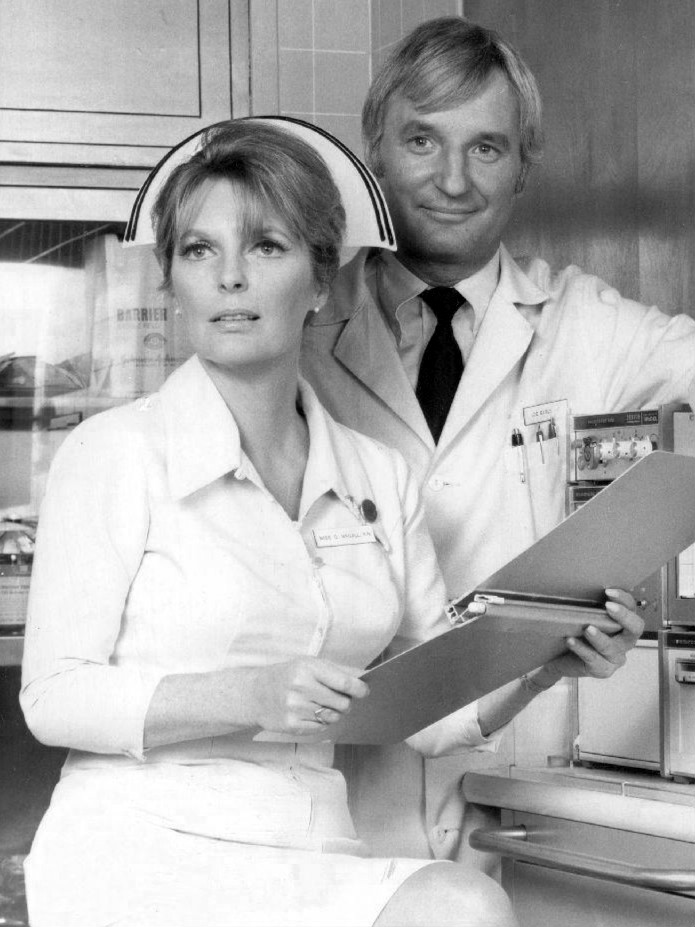
- Troup as Dr. Joe Early on 1970s television show, Emergency! with wife Julie London as nurse Dixie McCall
- Born: Robert William Troup Jr. October 18, 1918; Harrisburg, Pennsylvania, U.S.
- Died: February 7, 1999 (aged 80); Los Angeles, California, U.S.
- Education: Wharton School
- Occupations: Actor; musician
- Years active: 1941–1995
- Spouse(s): Cynthia Hare (m. 1942; div. 1955) Julie London (m. 1959)
- Children: 5, including Ronne

Robert William Troup Jr. (October 18, 1918 – February 7, 1999) was an American actor, jazz pianist, singer, and songwriter. He composed the rhythm and blues standard "(Get Your Kicks on) Route 66" and portrayed Dr. Joe Early in the television program Emergency! co-starring with his wife Julie London, in the 1970s.

== Early life ==
Robert William Troup Jr. was born in Harrisburg, Pennsylvania. His father Robert William Troup worked as a pianist for the family business J. H. Troup Music House and founded its Lancaster, Pennsylvania, branch store. He graduated from The Hill School, a preparatory school in Pottstown, Pennsylvania, in 1937. He went on to graduate Phi Beta Kappa from the Wharton School at the University of Pennsylvania with a degree in economics.

== Career ==
=== Military and music ===
His earliest musical success came in 1941 with the song "Daddy" written for a Mask and Wig production. Sammy Kaye and His Orchestra recorded "Daddy", which was number one for eight weeks on the Billboard chart and the number five record of 1941; other musicians who recorded it include Glenn Miller, Bing Crosby, Kay Kyser, and The Andrews Sisters. "Daddy" can be heard in the 1941 film Two Latins from Manhattan. The song is also performed by the title character in Tex Avery's cartoon short Red Hot Riding Hood (1943).

After graduating from college in 1941, he enlisted in the United States Marine Corps but did not receive orders until January 1942. After completing officer training, he was assigned as one of two dozen white officers to direct recruit training at Montford Point, the recruit depot for the first black Marines. In 1943 he became recreation officer and helped build a recreation hall, basketball court, and outdoor boxing ring. A friend installed a miniature golf course. At Montford Point, he also organized the first African-American band of U.S. Marines. During this time he composed "Take Me Away from Jacksonville", which was to become an anthem of sorts for the Marines at Montford Point and other areas of Camp Lejeune.

In February 1942, Troup's song "Snootie Little Cutie" was recorded by Frank Sinatra and Connie Haines with the Tommy Dorsey Orchestra and the Pied Pipers.

In 1946, Nat King Cole had a hit with Troup's most popular song, "(Get Your Kicks on) Route 66". The song was also recorded by Chuck Berry (1961), The Rolling Stones (1964), Depeche Mode (1987) and hundreds of other artists.

Troup's hipster interpretation of the fairy tale "The Three Bears" was first recorded by the Page Cavanaugh Trio in 1946 and later by Leon McAuliffe, and Ray Ellington.

Troup's recordings in the 1950s and 1960s were not commercially successful. He recorded for Liberty and Capitol. He wrote the title song (sung by Little Richard) for the 1950s rock and roll film The Girl Can't Help It. An instrumental version of his song "The Meaning of the Blues" appeared on the Miles Davis album Miles Ahead.

Around 1969, Troup collaborated with entertainer Tommy Leonetti, writing the lyrics for Leonetti's song "My City of Sydney".

=== Television and films ===
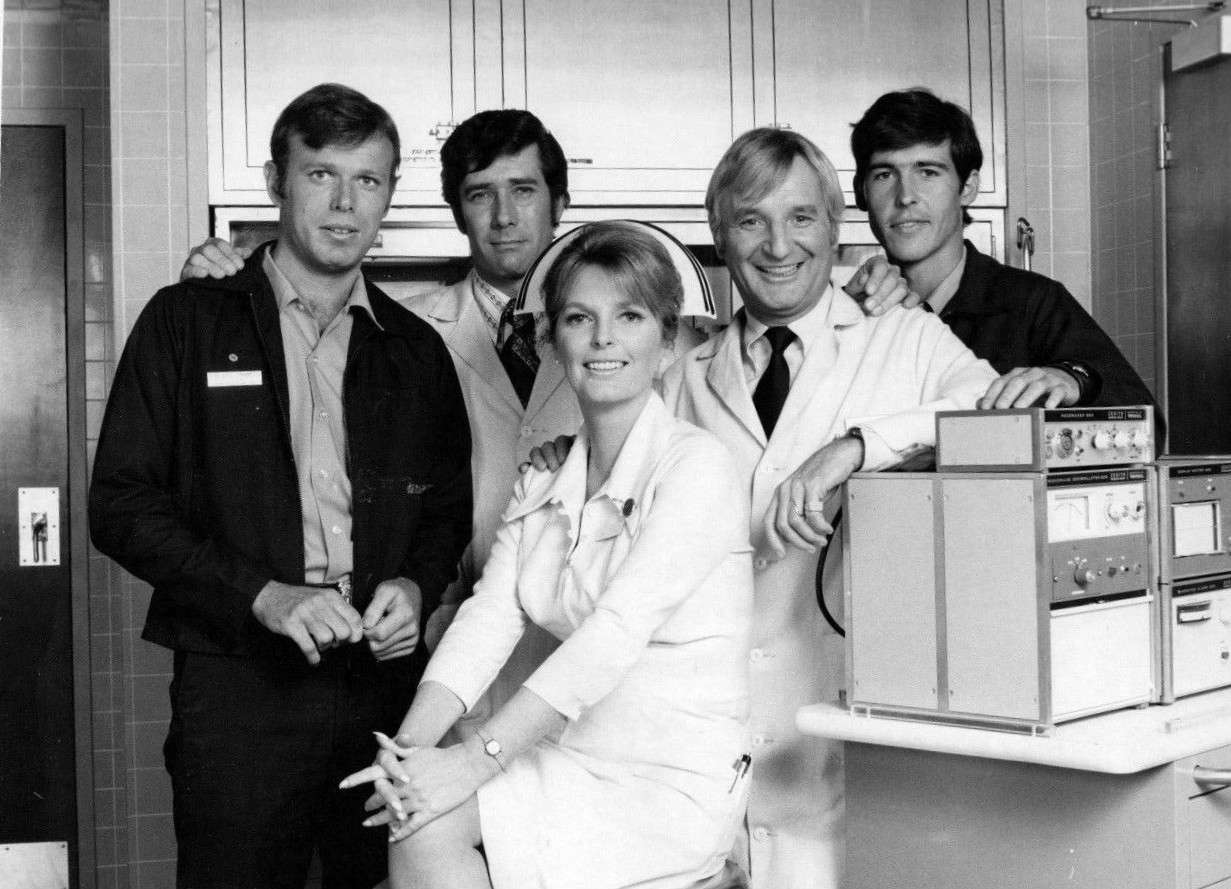
Cast of TV's Emergency! (1973), L-R: Kevin Tighe, Robert Fuller, Julie London, Bobby Troup and Randolph Mantooth

While he relied on songwriting royalties, Troup worked as an actor, appearing in Bop Girl Goes Calypso (1957), The High Cost of Loving (1958), The Five Pennies (1959), and playing musician Tommy Dorsey in the film The Gene Krupa Story (1959). He appeared as himself in the short-lived NBC television series Acapulco. He made three guest appearances on Perry Mason, and on two appearances, "The Case of the Jaded Joker" in 1959 and "The Case of the Missing Melody" in 1961, he showed his musical talents. In 1960 he appeared with his wife Julie London in an episode of Rawhide, "Incident at Royo Canyon". In 1969 and 1970, he appeared as "Bobby" in two episodes of Mannix, where he was a lounge piano player who helped Mannix unravel cases. Troup tried his luck at bowling on two episodes of Celebrity Bowling (1973–1975). He again appeared as a piano player in a cameo on The Hardy Boys/Nancy Drew Mysteries in 1978. Also in 1978 he appeared as a guest on Fantasy Island episode "Stalag 3".

His later films included First to Fight (1967) and Number One (1969) with Charlton Heston.

He appeared as disgruntled staff sergeant Gorman in Robert Altman's 1970 film M*A*S*H. He is the last actor named by the camp PA announcer in the end credits, and he has the last line of the film: "God-damned Army!"

Troup had appeared in several episodes of the Jack Webb television series Dragnet. In 1972, Webb cast Troup as Dr. Joe Early in the television series Emergency! with Webb's former wife Julie London as nurse Dixie McCall. Both Troup and London guest-starred as Emergency! personnel on an episode of Adam-12 also produced by Webb. In 1979, Troup played the part of Sam Gill in the TV miniseries The Rebels.

== Personal life ==
Troup married Cynthia Hare in May 1942. They had two daughters, Cynnie Troup (born 1943) and Ronne Troup (born 1945); both had careers in entertainment. The marriage ended in divorce in 1955. He met singer Julie London at the Celebrity Room, where he was singing. He encouraged her to pursue her singing career, and in 1955 he produced her million-selling hit record "Cry Me a River". London, previously married to actor Jack Webb (1947 to 1953), married Troup in 1959. They had one daughter, Kelly Troup (1962–2002), and twin sons, Jody (1963–2010) and Reese Troup.

== Death ==
On February 7, 1999, Troup died of a heart attack in the Los Angeles suburb of Sherman Oaks.

== Discography ==
- Bobby Troup! (Capitol, 1953)
- Bobby Troup and His Trio (Liberty, 1955)
- The Songs of Bobby Troup (Bethlehem, 1955)
- Bobby Troup Sings Johnny Mercer (Bethlehem, 1955)
- The Distinctive Style of Bobby Troup (Bethlehem, 1955)
- Bobby Swings Tenderly (Mode, 1957)
- Do Re Mi (Liberty, 1957)
- Here's to My Lady (Liberty, 1958)
- Cool Bobby Troup (Interlude, 1959)
- Bobby Troup and His Stars of Jazz (RCA Victor, 1959)
- Two Part Inventions for Trumpet with Benny Golson (Twig, 1970)
- In a Class Beyond Compare (Audiophile, 1981)
- Kicks On Route 66 (Hindsight, 1995)
- Makin' Whoopee But Oh So Tenderly (Vintage Jazz)
- The Feeling of Jazz (Starline, 1994)

== Selected compositions ==
- "Baby, Baby, All the Time" – Frankie Laine, Julie London, Nat King Cole, June Christy, Diana Krall
- "Bran' New Dolly" – written and sung by Bobby Troup on RCA Victor (1949)
- "Daddy" – Sammy Kaye (1941), The Andrews Sisters, The Charioteers, Glenn Miller, Julie London
- "Girl Talk", (Troup/Hefti) – Tony Bennett, Ella Fitzgerald, Julie London, Holly Cole, Betty Carter, and Ben Sidran (with new lyrics by Sidran).
- "Hungry Man" – Louis Jordan
- "I See Your Bass Before Me"
- "I'd Like You for Christmas" – Julie London
- "It Happened Once Before" – The Four Freshmen
- "Jack 'N Jill"
- "Jaded Joker Theme" – 1959 episode of Perry Mason, "The Case of the Jaded Joker", co-star Frankie Laine
- "Just the Way I Am" – June Christy, Stan Kenton
- "Lemon Twist" – Stan Kenton, Billy May, John Pizzarelli
- "Let's Keep Dancing" – Peggy Lee
- "My City of Sydney" (Troup/Leonetti) – Tommy Leonetti, XL Capris, Mary Schneider
- "Now You Know" – The Four Freshmen
- "One October Morning"
- "Out of the Shadows" – June Christy
- "Please Belong to Me"
- "(Get Your Kicks on) Route 66" – Nat King Cole Trio (1946), Bing Crosby and the Andrews Sisters, Perry Como, Chuck Berry, The Rolling Stones, Them, The Manhattan Transfer, Patti Page, Sandie Shaw and numerous others
- "Snootie Little Cutie", (1941) – Tommy Dorsey and His Orchestra featuring Frank Sinatra, Connie Haines, The Manhattan Transfer
- "The Feeling of Jazz" – words to Duke Ellington's composition
- "The Girl Can't Help It", (1956) – Little Richard, the Animals, Bobby Vee, Cliff Richard
- "The Meaning of the Blues" – Julie London, Miles Davis (1957), Shirley Horn, Irene Kral, Buddy Rich, Michael Brecker, Keith Jarrett
- "The Three Bears", (1946) – Page Cavanaugh Trio, Ray Ellington, Leon McAuliffe
- "Their Hearts Were Full of Spring" – The Four Freshmen, Jimmie Rodgers, The Beach Boys, Sue Raney, The Cyrkle
- "There She Goes"
- "This October" – The Four Freshmen, Julie London
- "You're Looking at Me" – Nat King Cole, Don Fagerquist, Stacey Kent, Diana Krall, Cleo Laine, Carmen McRae, Jerry Costanzo
- "Walking Shoes" – words to Gerry Mulligan's composition
