= Appalshop =

Non-profit organization in Kentucky

Appalshop official logo

Appalshop is a media, arts, and education center located in Whitesburg, Kentucky, in the heart of the southern Appalachian region of the United States.

== History ==
Appalshop was founded in 1969 as the Appalachian Film Workshop, a project of the United States government's War on Poverty. The organization was one of ten Community Film Workshops started by a partnership between the federal Office of Economic Opportunity and the American Film Institute. In 1974 they incorporated into a nonprofit company, under the name Appalshop, and established itself as a hub of filmmaking in Appalachia, and since that time has produced more than one hundred films, covering such subjects as coal mining, the environment, traditional culture, and the economy. The name was officially changed to reflect changing business structure and goals.

Appalshop also produces theater, music such as bluegrass recordings (released on its June Appal Recordings label), as well as photography, multimedia, and books.

Since 1985, Appalshop has also operated WMMT-FM (Mountain Community Radio), a radio station located in Whitesburg, Kentucky which serves much of central Appalachia (including portions of eastern Kentucky, southwest Virginia, and western West Virginia) with music and programming relevant to the region and its culture. WMMT also broadcasts live on the web.

During the 2022 floods in Eastern Kentucky, Appalshop and its archives were heavily damaged by water, sediment, and humidity. The center has since been working to recover its archives, with help from Iron Mountain. As of August 2023, the organization has managed to recover 13,500 items, including rare performances and interviews, an interview with leaders of the Eastern band of Cherokee, and materials relating to Black Appalachians. Some items, especially audiovisual resources, are being digitized into an expanded online library. However, employees estimate that about 15 to 20 percent of the archives have been lost forever. The damage to the building was extensive enough that a new building in Jenkins, which sits above the floodplain, had to be purchased. The organization plans to renovate the new building to meet their needs, while also respecting its history as a hospital and home. During the interim, the organization retrofitted an RV to serve as a mobile radio station.

== Mission ==
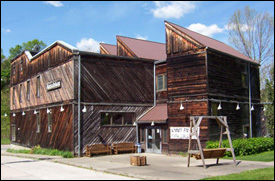
The former Appalshop Main Building in Whitesburg, Kentucky

As stated on its website, Appalshop's goals are:

- To document, disseminate, and revitalize the lasting traditions and contemporary creativity of Appalachia;
- To tell stories the commercial cultural industries don't tell, challenging stereotypes with Appalachian voices and visions;
- To support communities' efforts to achieve justice and equity and solve their own problems in their own ways;
- To celebrate cultural diversity as a positive social value; and
- To participate in regional, national, and global dialogue toward these ends.

== Funding ==
Appalshop relies on multiple funding sources, including endowments, individual donors, and public and private grants. In 2017, Appalshop reported that 45% of its funding came from private grants, 32% came from public grants, 10% came from its endowment, 5% came from individual donors, and 8% came from other sources.

=== Grants ===
==== National Endowment for the Humanities ====
The National Endowment for the Humanities (NEH) has awarded multiple grants to Appalshop, including a $100,000 grant to improve their public programming initiatives and access to their collections. The NEH stated that the grant would be ideal for this region because of the thousands of layoffs in the region related to reductions in coal mining jobs.

==== ArtPlace America ====
In July 2015, Appalshop was awarded $450,000 by ArtPlace America, which provided funding for increasing arts and technology training. The money also helped to diversify Letcher County's economy.

==== Economic Development Administration and Appalachian Regional Commission ====
A total of $275,000 in grants was awarded to the Southeast Kentucky High Tech Workforce Project, which was started by Appalshop. The Economic Development Administration awarded $200,000 and the Appalachian Regional Commission awarded $75,000. The grants will help develop a certificate program at Southeast Kentucky Community & Technical College campuses in Letcher focusing on information technology and media production.

== Awards ==
In 1990, Appalshop documentary producer Anne Lewis won the Alfred I. du Pont Award for Broadcast Journalism from Columbia University.

== See also ==
- June Appal Recordings
- WMMT (FM)

== Bibliography ==
- Charbonneau, Stephen Michael (16 November 2009). "Young Appalachian Selves, Autoethnographic Aesthetics, and the Founding of Appalshop". Journal of Popular Film and Television. 37 (3): 137–145. doi:10.1080/01956050903218125. S2CID 145742632.
- Jennings, Judi (1992). "Appalshop (United States)". In John E. Kleber (ed.). The Kentucky Encyclopedia. Lexington: University Press of Kentucky.
- Lewis, Anne (2011). "Appalshop". In John D. H. Downing (ed.). Encyclopedia of Social Movement Media. thousand Oaks, California: SAGE.
- Williams, John Alexander (2002). Appalachia: A History. Chapel Hill: The University of North Carolina Press.
- Appalachian Film Workshop/Appalshop Films collection, 1969–Present - Kentucky Digital Library
- Hoffman, Carl (1996) "The Voice of the Mountains" in Appalachia Magazine a publication of the Appalachian Regional Commission
- Ruby, Jay (1991) "Speaking For, Speaking About, Speaking With, or Speaking Alongside- An Anthropological and Documentary Dilemma" in Visual Anthropology Review Fall 1991 Volume 7 Number 2
