= Irene Kral =

American jazz musician (1932–1978)

- Born: February 18, 1932; Chicago, Illinois
- Died: August 15, 1978 (aged 46) Encino, Los Angeles
- Genres: Jazz
- Occupation: Vocalist

Irene Kral (January 18, 1932 – August 15, 1978) was an American jazz singer.

== Life ==
She was born to Czechoslovak parents in Chicago and settled in Los Angeles, California, in the early 1960s. She died from breast cancer in Encino, Los Angeles.

Kral's older brother, Roy Kral, was developing his own career as a musician, when she began to sing professionally as a teenager. She sang with bands on tours led by Woody Herman and Chubby Jackson, Herman's bass player. She joined Maynard Ferguson's band in the late 1950s and sang with groups led by Stan Kenton, Terry Gibbs, and Shelly Manne. She had a solo career until her death at 46 years of age. She was a ballad singer who said Carmen McRae was one of her inspirations. She became better known posthumously, when Clint Eastwood used her recordings in his 1995 movie The Bridges of Madison County.

Her style has been compared to that of Carmen McRae (the two singers were friends). Dana Countryman quotes from Linda Dahl's 1984 book on women in jazz, Stormy Weather: "Irene Kral had a lovely, resonant voice with a discreet vibrato, flawless diction and intonation, and a slight, attractive nasality and shaping of phrases that resembled Carmen McRae's. But where McRae's readings tend to the astringent, Kral's melt like butter. She was a master of quiet understatement and good taste."

== Discography ==
=== As leader ===
- The Band and I with Herb Pomeroy (United Artists, 1958)
- SteveIreneO! (United Artists, 1959)
- Better Than Anything with Junior Mance (Ava, 1963)
- Wonderful Life (Mainstream, 1965)
- Where Is Love? (Choice, 1974)
- Sessions, Live (Calliope, 1976)
- Kral Space (Catalyst, 1977)
- Gentle Rain (Choice, 1978) – with Alan Broadbent
- Angel Eyes (Trio, 1978)
- Live (Just Jazz, 2000)
- Just for Now (Jazzed Media, 2004)
- Second Chance (Jazzed Media, 2010)

=== As guest ===
- Laurindo Almeida, Guitar from Ipanema (Capitol, 1964)
- Buddy Collette, The Buddy Collette Quintet (Studio West, 2001)
- Maynard Ferguson, Boy with Lots of Brass (EmArcy, 1957)
- Terry Gibbs, Dream Band, Vol. 6: One More Time (Contemporary, 2002)
- Shelly Manne, My Fair Lady (Capitol, 1964)
