= Retreat from the Sun =

Studio album by That Dog
- Released: April 8, 1997
- Studio: Sunset Sound Factory (Los Angeles, California)
- Genre: Alternative rock; power pop
- Length: 46:40
- Label: DGC
- Producer: Brad Wood; That Dog

That Dog chronology
Totally Crushed Out! (1995)	Retreat from the Sun (1997)	Old LP (2019)

Singles from Retreat from the Sun
- 1. "Never Say Never" Released: 1997

Professional ratings
Review scores
Source	Rating
AllMusic	4/5 stars
The Encyclopedia of Popular Music	4/5 stars
E! Online	C+
Entertainment Weekly	B
Los Angeles Times	3/4 stars
MusicHound Rock	4/5 stars
Pitchfork	6.1/10 (1997); 8.5/10 (2020)
Rolling Stone	3/5 stars
The Village Voice	A−
Wall of Sound	80/100

Retreat from the Sun is the third studio album by American alternative rock band that dog.. It was released on April 8, 1997, on DGC Records.

"Never Say Never", the album's lead single, peaked at number 27 on the Billboard Alternative Songs chart.

== Legacy ==
On April 8, 2017, the reformed band celebrated the 20th anniversary of Retreat from the Sun's release by performing the album in its entirety at the El Rey Theatre in Los Angeles. The same year, Consequence of Sound placed the album at number 48 on its retrospective list of the best albums of 1997.

== Track listing ==
All tracks are written by Anna Waronker, except where noted.

No.	Title	Writer(s)	Length
1.	"I'm Gonna See You"		4:15
2.	"Never Say Never"		3:16
3.	"Being with You"		3:47
4.	"Gagged and Tied"	Waronker; Petra Haden; Rachel Haden; Tony Maxwell; Steven McDonald	3:18
5.	"Retreat from the Sun"		3:39
6.	"Minneapolis"		3:50
7.	"Annie"		3:40
8.	"Every Time I Try"		4:28
9.	"Long Island"		2:36
10.	"Hawthorne"		2:36
11.	"Did You Ever"	Waronker; John Goldman	3:07
12.	"Cowboy Hat"		3:51
13.	"Until the Day I Die"		4:17
Total length:			46:40

== Personnel ==
Credits for Retreat from the Sun adapted from album liner notes.

That Dog

- Anna Waronker – vocals, guitar, piano
- Petra Haden – vocals, violin, strings
- Rachel Haden – vocals, bass guitar
- Tony Maxwell – drums, percussion, surf guitar on "Retreat from the Sun"

Additional musicians

- Charlotte Caffey – rhythm guitar on "Minneapolis", synthesizer on "Never Say Never"
- Alix Fournier – French horn on "Until the Day I Die"
- Tanya Haden – cello on "Never Say Never", "Every Time I Try" and "Until the Day I Die"
- Chick Wolverton – shaker and additional guitar on "Cowboy Hat"

Production

- That Dog – production
- Greg Calbi – mastering
- Chris Lord-Alge – mixing on "Never Say Never"
- John Paterno – engineering, mixing
- Brad Wood – production, mixing

Artwork and design

- Jesse Frohman – photography
- Francesca Restrepo – design

== Charts ==
Chart (1997)	Peak position
US Heatseekers Albums (Billboard)	31
