= DGC Rarities Vol. 1 =

Compilation album by various artists
- Released: July 5, 1994
- Recorded: 1990–1994
- Genre: Alternative rock
- Length: 50:23
- Language: English
- Label: DGC
- Producer: Various

DGC Rarities Vol. 1 is a 1994 compilation of songs by alternative rock bands on the American record label DGC Records. The songs are all B-sides, demos, covers and other rarities. No further volumes were released.

== Contents ==
The album opens with "Mad Dog 20/20" by Teenage Fanclub. According to Gerard Love, the song is about being a teenager in Bellshill, Scotland. The song was an outtake from their album Thirteen, and, according to the compilation liner notes, had been excluded from the record because its lyrics violated the "Scottish Good Lyric Act of 1973". "Pay to Play" by Nirvana is an early demo version of "Stay Away", a song that would eventually find its way onto their 1991 breakout album Nevermind. It was the first new Nirvana song to be released after the death of frontman Kurt Cobain but its inclusion on the compilation album had been agreed to before he died. Weezer's contribution, "Jamie", was written as an ode to the band's first lawyer. The song was recorded by Dale Johnson as part of a school project. He captured the audio live onto a 2-track recorder, without any overdubs. Although he only managed to get a B+ on the project, Rivers Cuomo, lead singer of Weezer, remarked that the song "sounds cool [and] makes us feel a weird sort of nostalgia for a time in our lives that actually sucked." When it came time for "Jamie" to appear on this album, the members of Weezer were worried that, sonically, it would not be up to par with other tracks. Eventually, the band's A&R representative Todd Sullivan assured them that the song's feel was "amazing", and the members finally agreed.

The Cell song "Never Too High" was recorded in January 1991 in a "cave with rock walls and a dug-out floor". Davie Lowe and Sharpie of Philly's Blue agreed to help out with the song in exchange for beer, and the song eventually was released as a single on Ecstatic Peace Records. Hole contributed "Beautiful Son" to the album. Beck submitted "Bogusflow", a "pisstake of 'Even Flow' by Pearl Jam" that decries bands and musicians wanting only to be like Nirvana; the song specifically, though cryptically, mocks Eddie Vedder. "Compilation Blues" by Sonic Youth was an outtake from their album Experimental Jet Set, Trash and No Star. It was recorded during the final night of the album's recording sessions. The track never made it onto the final album, and Thurston Moore later called it "a total rarity." According to Anna Waronker and Tony Maxwell of that dog., "Grunge Couple" was written as a tribute to both Sonic Youth and Spinal Tap.

"Einstein on the Beach (For an Eggman)" by Counting Crows was written by Adam Duritz and David Bryson one night in a hotel room. Duritz kept humming guitar parts, and Bryson kept coming up with vocal melodies; the two finalized the song at 4 am and recorded a rough version of it on the hotel room's answering machine. Although it was a favorite of the band's, it did not fit with the musical stylings of August and Everything After because it was not "mopey enough", so it was left off. The main part of the title is a reference to the Philip Glass opera Einstein on the Beach, whereas the subtitle is a reference to John Lennon. During a self-produced and self-financed recording session, The Posies recorded "Open Every Window". Although the band was not pleased with a majority of the tracks recorded during this time, Jon Auer noted that "Open Every Window" was "a song desperately trying to be positive amid the depression." Sloan's "Stove/Smother" is actually a cover medley of two tracks by the band Eric's Trip. The song, which makes use of drum loops, was recorded as two separate pieces before Jay Ferguson put them together on a 4-track recorder. The song was later released on a split 7-inch with Eric's Trip covering the band's composition "Laying Blame" on its a-side as a benefit single for the Halifax-based radio station CKDU on Cinnamon Toast Records. "Wild Goose Chasing" by St. Johnny was recorded on behest of DGC Records. Because the band did not have any b-sides or outtakes for this album, they were forced to record a new song. Written in the winter of 1990, Murray Attaway's song "Allegory" opens with four lines from the Appalachian folk song "I See the Moon". Lyrically, the song revolves around the "relation of humanity to the imponderable". The album closes with "Don't Tell Your Mother" by The Sundays. One of the earliest songs written by the band, it was their first studio recording, in around 1988. The song was originally a b-side to the band's single "Can't Be Sure".

=== European version ===
The European edition of the album, called Geffen Rarities Vol. 1 omits the tracks by Teenage Fanclub, Hole, Cell, and the Sundays, but includes a Butcher Bros. remix of "Dropout" by Urge Overkill and "The Plague" by Maria McKee. "Dropout" began as a musical loop that had been recorded around the time of the band's 1993 album Saturation. The band never took the song particularly seriously. On the last day of recording, however, Blackie Onassis added guitar and vocals to it, which prompted Nash Kato to note that it sounded like "space folk".

== Reception ==
=== Critical ===
Professional ratings
Review scores
Source	Rating
Allmusic	3/5 stars

Stephen Thomas Erlewine of Allmusic gave the album a mixed review, awarding it three stars out of five. He felt that while all of the bands and musicians on the album had a recognizable style, the uneven quality of the recordings made the album only "a curiosity." He complimented "Pay to Play", calling it "interesting", as well as "Einstein on the Beach (For an Eggman)", noting that it is "looser and better than anything on August and Everything After", but ultimately he called the record "a mixed bag". Allmusic eventually chose "Pay to Play", "Jamie", "Compilation Blues" and "Einstein on the Beach (For an Eggman)" as "picks" from the album. In 2007, Matt LeMay of Pitchfork Media called the compilation "excellent", citing it as an example of a compilation that made rare songs from notable alternative artists more available.

=== Commercial ===
DGC Rarities Vol. 1 reached number 139 on the Billboard 200. The Counting Crows song "Einstein on the Beach (For an Eggman)" reached number 45 on the Billboard Hot 100 Airplay chart and became the first Counting Crows song to reach number one on the Billboard Modern Rock Tracks. The Nirvana song "Pay to Play" received limited airplay on US rock radio in late 1994.

== Track listing ==
American edition

1. Teenage Fanclub, "Mad Dog 20/20" (Gerard Love) – 2:40
2. Nirvana, "Pay to Play" (Kurt Cobain) – 3:28
3. Weezer, "Jamie" (Rivers Cuomo) – 4:19
4. Cell, "Never Too High" (Ian James, Jerry DiRienzo, David Motamed, Keith Nealy, Renée Birkmeyer) – 5:19
5. Hole, "Beautiful Son" (Courtney Love, Eric Erlandson, Patty Schemel) – 2:28
6. Beck, "Bogusflow" (Beck) – 3:11
7. Sonic Youth, "Compilation Blues" (Kim Gordon, Thurston Moore, Lee Ranaldo, Steve Shelley) – 3:00
8. that dog., "Grunge Couple" (Anna Waronker, Petra Haden, Rachel Haden, Tony Maxwell) – 3:53
9. Counting Crows, "Einstein on the Beach (For an Eggman)" (Adam Duritz, David Bryson) – 3:53
10. The Posies, "Open Every Window" (Jon Auer, Ken Stringfellow) – 3:14
11. Sloan, "Stove/Smother" (Eric's Trip) – 4:44
12. St. Johnny, "Wild Goose Chasing" (Bill Whitten) – 3:01
13. Murray Attaway, "Allegory" (Attaway) – 4:32
14. The Sundays, "Don't Tell Your Mother" (Harriet Wheeler, David Gavurin) – 2:36

European edition

1. Urge Overkill, "Dropout" – 4:27
2. Nirvana, "Pay to Play" – 3:28
3. Weezer, "Jamie" – 4:19
4. Sonic Youth, "Compilation Blues" – 3:00
5. Beck, "Bogusflow" – 3:11
6. that dog., "Grunge Couple" – 3:53
7. Counting Crows, "Einstein on the Beach (For an Eggman)" – 3:53
8. Maria McKee, "The Plague" – 3:44
9. The Posies, "Open Every Window" – 3:14
10. Sloan, "Stove/Smother" – 4:44
11. St. Johnny, "Wild Goose Chasing" – 3:01
12. Murray Attaway, "Allegory" – 4:32

== Charts ==
Chart performance for DGC Rarities Vol. 1
Chart	Peak
Australian Albums (ARIA)	95
Australian Alternative Albums (ARIA)	10
US Billboard 200	139
