= Totally Crushed Out! =

Studio album by That Dog
- Released: July 18, 1995
- Recorded: May 1994 – January 1995
- Studios: Poop Alley (Los Angeles); Toad Hall (Pasadena); Westbeach Recorders (Hollywood); Soundcastle (Silver Lake)
- Genres: Power pop; pop-punk
- Length: 38:42
- Label: DGC
- Producers: That Dog; Tom Grimley; Paul du Gré; Rob Cavallo

That Dog chronology
That Dog (1993)	Totally Crushed Out! (1995)	Retreat from the Sun (1997)

Singles from Totally Crushed Out!
- 1. "He's Kissing Christian" Released: 1995

Professional ratings
Review scores
Source	Rating
AllMusic	4.5/5 stars
The Encyclopedia of Popular Music	4/5 stars
The Great Indie Discography	8/10
MusicHound Rock	3.5/5 stars
Pitchfork	8.3/10
Punknews.org	5/5 stars
The Village Voice	A−

Totally Crushed Out! is the second studio album by American alternative rock band that dog.. It was released on July 18, 1995, on DGC Records.

The album produced the single "He's Kissing Christian", for which a music video was directed by Frank Sacramento. Totally Crushed Out! also includes the band's longest song, "Rockstar", clocking in at well over seven minutes.

The album explores themes such as puppy love, limerance and infatuationan.

== Background ==
Totally Crushed Out! is a loosely-based concept album about love and crushes, featuring an album cover that resembles artwork from the Sweet Valley High young adult book series. This theme is further demonstrated within the rest of the album packaging. The tracks are listed as a table of contents with song lyrics broken up into chapters, while photos of the band appear under an "About the Authors" section, with a short biography on each member. The album's back cover features a brief synopsis of a fictitious story that includes the song titles in their playing order within the text:

She's feeling like a Ms. Wrong again. Silently she pursues him even though something doesn't feel right. Telling herself, "in the back of my mind, I have a crush again." Either he's kissing Christian or he's being shy. Anymore of this will put her over the edge. She wants to say, "to keep me, things are going to have to change because I keep putting on lip gloss and you won't kiss me," but she's too crushed out to talk to him. It seems like everyone is saying "she doesn't know how to handle another crush." The holidays are coming and she's getting depressed. But she knows that babe with the side part will show up one summer night and be her Mr. Right. It's time for her to say no to the boys who give up like Michael Jordan, so she can find her very own rockstar... or is it?

== Track listing ==
All tracks are written by Anna Waronker, except where noted.

No.	Title	Writer(s)	Length
1.	"Ms. Wrong"	Waronker; Jennifer Konner	2:26
2.	"Silently"		2:29
3.	"In the Back of My Mind"		2:04
4.	"He's Kissing Christian"		3:31
5.	"Anymore"		2:42
6.	"To Keep Me"		2:21
7.	"Lip Gloss"		2:58
8.	"She Doesn't Know How"		2:26
9.	"Holidays"		2:30
10.	"Side Part"		2:01
11.	"One Summer Night"		2:10
12.	"Michael Jordan"		3:27
13.	"Rockstar"		7:37
Total length:			38:42

== Personnel ==
Credits for Totally Crushed Out! adapted from album liner notes.

That Dog

- Anna Waronker – vocals, guitar
- Petra Haden – vocals, violin
- Rachel Haden – vocals, bass, percussion
- Tony Maxwell – drums, piano, acoustic guitar, percussion

Additional musicians

- Tanya Haden – cello
- Joey Waronker – additional percussion
- CRIB – additional noise on "To Keep Me"
- Speculum Fight – additional noise on "To Keep Me"

Production

- That Dog – production, mixing
- Greg Calbi – mastering (Masterdisk)
- Rob Cavallo – production, mixing
- Paul du Gré – production, mixing
- Jerry Finn – mixing
- Tom Grimley – production, mixing

Artwork and design

- That Dog – art direction, design
- Jason Dowd – album cover painting
- Robert Fisher – art direction, design
- Robin Sloane – creative direction
