= That Dog (album) =

Studio album by That Dog
- Released: November 8, 1993
- Recorded: July 1992 – July 1993
- Studio: Poop Alley (Los Angeles, California); Surrogate Spike (Los Angeles, California)
- Genre: Alternative rock; pop punk
- Length: 41:00
- Label: Guernica; DGC
- Producer: that dog.; Tom Grimley; Chrisa Sadd

That Dog chronology
That Dog (1993)	Totally Crushed Out! (1995)

Singles from That Dog
- 1. "Old Timer" Released: 1994

Professional ratings
Review scores
Source	Rating
AllMusic	3.5/5 stars
Q	4/5 stars

That Dog (stylized as that dog.) is the debut studio album by American alternative rock band that dog. The album was released on November 8, 1993, in the United Kingdom on the 4AD imprint Guernica, and on March 1, 1994, in the United States on DGC Records. Several of the album's tracks had previously been issued on the EP that dog. on Magnatone Products, released earlier in 1993.

"Old Timer" was released as the album's only single, and featured a music video directed by Spike Jonze.

== Track listing ==
All lyrics are written by Anna Waronker, except where noted; all music is composed by that dog.

No.	Title	Lyrics	Length
1.	"Old Timer"	Waronker; Jennifer Konner	2:08
2.	"Jump"		3:15
3.	"Raina"		2:12
4.	"You Are Here"		4:36
5.	"Just Like Me"		2:22
6.	"She"		2:57
7.	"Angel"		3:46
8.	"Westside Angst"	Waronker; Konner	1:49
9.	"She Looks at Me"	Rachel Haden	2:30
10.	"Punk Rock Girl"	Waronker; Konner	2:07
11.	"Zodiac"		2:02
12.	"Family Functions"	Waronker; Konner	2:20
13.	"She Looks at Me (Reprise)"		0:52
14.	"Paid Programming"		2:51
15.	"This Boy"		5:13
Total length:			41:00

== Personnel ==
Credits for that dog. adapted from album liner notes.

that dog.

- Anna Waronker – vocals, guitar
- Petra Haden – vocals, violin
- Rachel Haden – vocals, bass, acoustic guitar
- Tony Maxwell – drums, wah-wah

Additional musicians

- Tanya Haden – cello, backing vocals on "Family Functions"

Production

- that dog. – production, mixing
- Tom Grimley – production, mixing
- Bob Ludwig – mastering (Gateway Mastering)
- Chrisa Sadd – production, mixing

Artwork and design

- that dog. – album artwork
- Melodie McDaniel – photography
