= Old LP =

Studio album by That Dog
- Released: October 4, 2019
- Recorded: 2016–2019
- Studios: The Boat (Silver Lake, Los Angeles, California); Kingsize Soundlabs (Los Angeles, California); Park Oak (Los Angeles, California); The Whiskey Kitchen (Los Angeles, California)
- Genres: Alternative rock; indie rock; pop-punk
- Length: 40:03
- Label: UMe
- Producers: That Dog; Anna Waronker

That Dog chronology
Retreat from the Sun (1997)	Old LP (2019)

Singles from Old LP
- 1. "If You Just Didn't Do It" Released: August 21, 2019

Old LP is the fourth studio album by American alternative rock band that dog., released on October 4, 2019, by UME. The album is the band's first since their 2011 reformation and was met with universal acclaim from critics.

== Recording and release ==
Songwriting for Old LP began in 2012 and recording, funded in part via Kickstarter, began in 2016 after that dog.'s 2011–2012 tours. Former band member Petra Haden declined to participate in the recording of the album. The album was preceded by the 2015 single "Mean What I Say", recorded with Andrew Dost.

Old LP was released by UME on October 4, 2019, marking the band's first album in 22 years. The lead single from Old LP, "If You Just Didn't Do It", was released in August 2019, and the music video for "Just the Way" debuted two days before the album's release. A tape edition of the album was released for Cassette Store Day in 2019.

== Reception ==
Professional ratings
Aggregate scores
Source	Rating
Metacritic	85/100
Review scores
Source	Rating
AllMusic	4.5/5 stars
And It Don't Stop	A−
The Line of Best Fit	9/10
Paste	7.8/10
Pitchfork	7.4/10
Under the Radar	7.5/10

According to the review aggregator Metacritic, Old LP received "universal acclaim" based on a weighted average score of 85 out of 100 from six critic scores.

Reviewing for The New York Times, Jon Pareles said, "The music is denser and more intricate, conjuring symphonic grandeur alongside overdriven noise. The jokes are gone; the stakes feel higher. But the band's underlying moxie hasn't changed." AllMusic reviewer Heather Phares highlighted the stylistic diversity of Old LP and said, "All of the time invested in the album pays off richly: Old LP shows how that dog. has grown into their legacy". Maura Johnston of Pitchfork praised the band's mix of pop sensibilities and rock performance: "Old LP works because its growth doesn't pander to modern notions of 'cool.' But the way the band re-balances the grime-vs.-grandiosity equation with each song demonstrates that when it comes to musical math, the proof matters as much as the outcome." Nina Corcoran of The A.V. Club wrote that the band "commit to graceful indie rock and poppy alt-rock, but sound happiest when revisiting the jubilant pop-punk hooks of its heyday".

For The Line of Best Fit, Alex Wisgard praised Old LP for expanding the band's sound and found that it "is so assured and confident, it's easy to imagine another two decades of additional back catalogue we simply never heard". Scott D. Elingburg of Under the Radar called the album "a steady, hard-won set of songs that unfold after many, compounded listens". In his "Consumer Guide" column, Robert Christgau found that the melodies range from "catchy to exquisite" and, "though the hyperconscious lyrics often seem constricted, resentful, unresolved, the music lifts them up, and then the title finale lifts the whole album up." In Paste, Ben Salmon concluded that that dog. "were—and are—a band that offers a unique voice within their field, and it's wonderful to have them back".

== Track listing ==
All tracks are written by Anna Waronker.

1. "Your Machine" – 2:58
2. "Just the Way" – 3:41
3. "Bird on a Wire" – 4:28
4. "Drip Drops" – 2:27
5. "If You Just Didn’t Do It" – 3:40
6. "When We Were Young" – 4:18
7. "Alone Again" – 3:01
8. "Down Without a Fight" – 2:54
9. "Never Want to See Your Face Again" – 3:47
10. "Least I Could Do" – 4:27
11. "Old LP" – 4:22

== Personnel ==
Credits for Old LP adapted from album liner notes.

That Dog

- Rachel Haden – bass guitar, vocals, production
- Tony Maxwell – drums, guitar, percussion, piano, production
- Anna Waronker – guitar, vocals, orchestration, production, recording

Additional musicians

- Lauren Baba – viola on "Old LP"
- Melia Badalian – French horn on "Old LP"
- Erin Barnes – bass drum on "Old LP"
- Gordon Bash – double bass on "Drip Drops" and "Old LP"
- Charlotte Caffey – harpsichord on "Your Machine", handclaps on "When We Were Young"
- Paul Cartwright – violin on "Old LP"
- Elizabeth Ellen Chorley – violin on "Old LP"
- Rob Covacevich – flute on "Old LP"
- Graham Coxon – guitar on "Never Want to See Your Face Again"
- Kevin Devine – handclaps on "When We Were Young"
- Andrew Dost – horns on "When We Were Young"
- Brandon Encinas – viola on "Old LP"
- Sean Franz – clarinet on "Old LP"
- Steve Gregoropoulos – conductor on "Old LP"
- Tanya Haden – cello on "Your Machine", "Just the Way", "Drip Drops", "Alone Again" and "Least I Could Do"
- Leah "Daddy" Harmon – accordion on "Old LP"
- Erik Hughes – trombone on "Old LP"
- Josh Klinghoffer – bass drum on "Alone Again" and "Old LP", Casio SK-1 synthesizer, piano and vibraharp on "Never Want to See Your Face Again"
- Petri Korpela – timpani on "Old LP"
- Nate Laguzza – cymbals on "Old LP"
- Danny Levin – flugelhorn on "Old LP"
- Luis Mascaro – violin on "Old LP"
- Bianca McClure – violin on "Old LP"
- Astrid McDonald – handclaps on "When We Were Young"
- Jeff McDonald – handclaps on "When We Were Young"
- Fuzzbee Morse – flute on "Old LP"
- Randy Newman – orchestration
- Kathryn Nicole Nockels – bassoon on "Old LP"
- Ken Oak – cello on "Old LP"
- Corrine Olsen – viola on "Old LP"
- Neil Rosengarden – French horn on "Old LP"
- Maya Rudolph – vocals on "When We Were Young" and "Old LP"
- Todd Simon – horns on "Alone Again"
- Jacob Szekely – cello on "Old LP"
- Andres Trujillo – tuba on "Old LP"
- Joey Waronker – snare drum on "Old LP"
- Kaitlin Wolfberg – violin on "Your Machine", "Just the Way", "Drip Drops", "If You Just Didn't Do It", "When We Were Young", "Alone Again", "Least I Could Do" and "Old LP", violin contractor on "Old LP"
- Chick Wolverton – guitar on "Bird on a Wire"

Technical personnel

- Annette Cisneros – recording on "Old LP"
- David Juros – recording on "Old LP"
- Ethan Mates – recording on "Your Machine" and "Never Want to See Your Face Again"
- Steven McDonald – mixing, recording
- Pierre de Reeder – recording on "Just the Way", "When We Were Young", "Down Without a Fight" and "Least I Could Do"
- Jack Shirley – mastering
- James Slater – recording on "Old LP"

== See also ==
- List of 2019 albums
