= It's Not How Far You Fall, It's the Way You Land =

Studio album by Soulsavers
- Released: 2 April 2007
- Recorded: 2006
- Genres: Slowcore; trip hop
- Length: 46:32
- Labels: V2 (UK); Columbia, Red Ink (USA)
- Producer: Soulsavers

Soulsavers chronology
Tough Guys Don't Dance (2003)	It's Not How Far You Fall, It's the Way You Land (2007)	Broken (2009)

Mark Lanegan chronology
Ballad of the Broken Seas (2006)	It's Not How Far You Fall, It's the Way You Land (2007)	Saturnalia (2008)

Singles from It's Not How Far You Fall, It's the Way You Land
- 1. "Revival" Released: 30 April 2007; 2. "Kingdoms of Rain" / "Jesus of Nothing" Released: 20 August 2007

Professional ratings
Review scores
Source	Rating
AllMusic	3.5/5 stars
Arkansas Online	4/5
The A.V. Club	B
Cokemachineglow	78%
The Guardian	4/5 stars
Laut.de	3/5 stars
Now	5/5 Ns
PopMatters	6/10
The Skinny	3/5 stars
Uncut	1.5/5 stars

It's Not How Far You Fall, It's the Way You Land is the second studio album by English-American production team Soulsavers, released on 2 April 2007 in the UK and 16 October 2007 in the US. The album also produced two singles.

== Background ==
The album features American singer Mark Lanegan as primary vocalist. Lanegan is also credited as a co-writer for five of the album's songs.

The album also features guests Jimi Goodwin of Doves, Will Oldham (a.k.a. Bonnie "Prince" Billy), P.W. Long and Richard Warren. The album spawned two singles, "Revival" and "Kingdoms of Rain". "Kingdoms of Rain" was initially released on Lanegan's second solo album, Whiskey for the Holy Ghost, in 1994. The album also features cover versions of Neil Young's "Through My Sails", Josh Haden's "Spiritual", and the Rolling Stones' "No Expectations". An instrumental titled "End Title Theme" is also included as a hidden track after "No Expectations" ends.

"Kingdoms of Rain" was featured in a season 2 episode of the TV series Lie to Me, in the episode "Truth or Consequences", which premiered in October 2009.

== Reception ==
Trevor Kelly in his review for The A.V. Club wrote that the album "sounds more like the work of a slow-moving rock band than the moody electronica they honed early in their career. Throughout, the duo borrows heavily from the teary-eyed soul of Spiritualized and the gothic balladry of Sparklehorse, resulting in a few moments that require undivided attention." Dorian Lynskey of The Guardian stated, "Grunge survivor Mark Lanegan roams the rock landscape like a gun-for-hire, leasing his eerie gravitas to the likes of Queens of the Stone Age and Isobel Campbell, before moving on. His leathery, careworn baritone is always a welcome presence, and British duo the Soulsavers have reconfigured their previously unremarkable downtempo beats around it, to everyone's benefit. Respectful but not sycophantic, Ian Glover and Richard Machin bring out the tenderness and battered grace in their guest's voice." Neil Ferguson of The Skinny added, "Elusive and almost fragile, [the album] follows the archetypal Soulsavers sound closely but becomes, nevertheless, a satisfying, heartening and warm journey for the listener."

== Track listing ==
No.	Title	Writer(s)	Length
1.	"Revival" (vocals by Mark Lanegan)	Lanegan, Machin, Glover	4:11
2.	"Ghosts of You and Me" (vocals by Mark Lanegan and P.W. Long)	Lanegan, Machin, Glover	4:19
3.	"Paper Money" (vocals by Mark Lanegan)	Lanegan, Machin, Glover	3:19
4.	"Ask the Dust" (instrumental)	Machin, Glover	4:17
5.	"Spiritual" (vocals by Mark Lanegan)	Haden	5:34
6.	"Kingdoms of Rain" (vocals by Mark Lanegan and Jimi Goodwin)	Lanegan, Machin, Glover	3:52
7.	"Through My Sails" (vocals by Mark Lanegan and Bonnie 'Prince' Billy)	Young	3:27
8.	"Arizona Bay" (instrumental)	Machin, Glover	4:59
9.	"Jesus of Nothing" (vocals by Mark Lanegan)	Lanegan, Machin, Glover	4:13
10.	"No Expectations" / "End Title Theme" (vocals by Mark Lanegan)	Jagger, Richards; Machin, Glover	8:26
Total length:			46:32

== Charts ==
Chart (2007)	Peak position
Belgian Albums (Ultratop Wallonia)	98
Italian Albums (FIMI)	83

== Singles ==
In the UK, two singles were released (with music videos produced):

- "Revival" (7" vinyl, 30 April 2007)
  1. "Revival" – 4:11
  2. "Blues Run the Game" (Jackson C. Frank) – 2:53
- "Kingdoms of Rain" (20 August 2007)
  - Released as a one-sided etched 7" vinyl single or a limited edition 10" single:
  1. "Kingdoms of Rain" – 3:55
  2. "Jesus of Nothing" – 4:12
