= Anna Waronker =

American musician

- Born: Anna Jeanette Waronker; July 10, 1972 (age 53); Los Angeles, California, United States
- Occupations: Singer-songwriter, composer, producer
- Years active: 1991–present
- Member of: That Dog

Anna Jeanette Waronker (born July 10, 1972) is an American singer-songwriter, composer, and producer best known as the frontwoman of That Dog. She is the daughter of producer Lenny Waronker and actress and musician Donna Loren, the sister of session drummer Joey Waronker, and is married to Steven Shane McDonald of Redd Kross and the Melvins.

== That Dog (1991–1997, 2011–present) ==
Waronker was born on July 10, 1972, in Los Angeles, California. After graduating from high school, Waronker formed the band that would become That Dog. The group consisted of Waronker on lead vocals and guitar, Petra Haden on violin, Rachel Haden on bass, and Tony Maxwell on drums. That Dog released three albums on DGC Records: That Dog, Totally Crushed Out!, and Retreat from the Sun. They toured with such acts as Beck, Weezer, and Blur. That Dog announced their breakup in 1997 after their third album, Retreat from the Sun, which had originally been intended as Waronker's first solo record. The group reunited in 2011.

== Solo work ==
Waronker founded her own record company, Five Foot Two Records, with her sister-in-law Charlotte Caffey, on which she released her first solo record in 2002, titled Anna By Anna Waronker.

Waronker recorded a cover version of the song "Catch" by The Cure specifically for the Songs For Summer compilation album, a memorial for Summer Brannin.

In the early 2000s, Waronker played several solo shows and a few other shows with the short-lived Ze Malibu Kids. Waronker is also heard in the song "No Soul" by the band Say Anything. Waronker provides vocals on the tracks "Be Calm" and "At Least I'm Not As Sad As I Used To Be" by New York band fun.

Waronker has contributed to film and TV soundtracks, including the score and an original song for Dealbreaker (a short film co-written and co-directed by Mary Wigmore and Gwyneth Paltrow) in 2005.

She composed the score for Paramount+ original School Spirits which aired its first season in Spring 2023.

== Other projects ==
During the time she was with That Dog, Waronker and bandmate Petra Haden backed up Beck on a number of demos and b-sides. Waronker has also co-produced with her husband Steven McDonald on several projects, including his revision of the White Stripes album White Blood Cells, and the Imperial Teen albums On and The Hair the TV the Baby and the Band.

Waronker is a member of Ze Malibu Kids, which also includes Steven McDonald, Jeff McDonald, and Astrid McDonald.

Waronker has composed and scored for film and television, including Josie and the Pussycats and the television series Clueless (1996–1999), where she collaborated with Charlotte Caffey (the Go-Go's). Five of Waronker's songs were featured on the television series Dawson's Creek.

Waronker played Joan Jett in the film What We Do Is Secret written and directed by Rodger Grossman. In 2005, she contributed to the UNICEF benefit song, "Do They Know It's Hallowe'en?". In 2007, Waronker appeared on Say Anything's "In Defense of the Genre", where she performed guest vocals on the track "No Soul". In late April 2007, Waronker's song "How Am I Doing?" was played at the end of a Grey's Anatomy episode, entitled "Desire". A sample of her song "I Don't Wanna" was played in the 2008 Movie The Haunting of Molly Hartley.

In October 2008, she collaborated with her sister-in-law Charlotte Caffey on Lovelace: A Rock Musical.

On February 8, 2011, Waronker's California Fade was released via digital download and limited vinyl orders.

Waronker provides backing vocals on "The Getaway", the title track to the Red Hot Chili Peppers eleventh studio album which was released on June 17, 2016, and on A Walk with Love & Death by the Melvins (now joined by Steven McDonald), released on July 7, 2017. She also co-wrote the Melvins song "Embrace the Rub", from their 2018 album Pinkus Abortion Technician, with McDonald and Josh Klinghoffer.

In 2021, Waronker and Craig Wedren collaborated on the soundtrack to Showtime's Yellowjackets. Together they composed and produced the original theme song "No Return" for the opening credits, as well as the score for the show. This followed on from their collaboration on Hulu's Shrill in 2019.

== Partial discography ==
That Dog

- That Dog (1994)
- Totally Crushed Out! (1995)
- Retreat from the Sun (1997)
- Old LP (2019)

Ze Malibu Kids

- Sound It Out (2002)

Solo Work

- Anna (2002)
- Castle (Music from the TV show) – EP (2009)
- California Fade (2011)
