= The Blue Moods of Spain =

Studio album by Spain
- Released: September 8, 1995
- Recorded: February 1995
- Studio: Brilliant Studios (San Francisco, California)
- Genre: Slowcore; dream pop
- Length: 61:21
- Label: Restless
- Producer: Josh Haden; Norman Kerner

Spain chronology
The Blue Moods of Spain (1995)	She Haunts My Dreams (1999)

Singles from The Blue Moods of Spain
- 1. "I Lied" Released: 1994; 2. "Dreaming of Love" Released: 1995; 3. "Spiritual" Released: 1996

The Blue Moods of Spain is the debut studio album by American rock band Spain, released on September 8, 1995, on Restless Records.

"Spiritual" was later recorded by Johnny Cash for his album American II: Unchained.

== Release ==
The tracks "I Lied" and "Dreaming of Love" were released as 7-inch singles. A music video was produced for "Untitled #1".

== Reception ==
Professional ratings
Review scores
Source	Rating
AllMusic	3/5 stars
Entertainment Weekly	B+
NME	8/10
The Rolling Stone Album Guide	3/5 stars

In a contemporary review, Melody Maker praised The Blue Moods of Spain as "the most gorgeous music you'll hear all year", describing Spain as "quiet masters of atmosphere, subtle craftsmen who weave a sumptuous, melodic spell with the lightest of instrumental touches". NME noted "a rich, glorious warmth to their songs that combines the melodic simplicity of... The Velvet Underground... the metronomic precision of Spiritualized... and the heartbroken sentiment of the Tindersticks." Richie Unterberger of AllMusic was more reserved in his praise and felt that Spain succeed at evoking "a brooding, late-night atmosphere" with "seductive drones... and melancholy, pensive songs", while adding that the album is "a bit monotonous all at once" and would have benefited from a more expressive vocalist.

In 2004's The New Rolling Stone Album Guide, critic Allison Stewart wrote that The Blue Moods of Spain "made up in style what it lacked in musical variation." In 2012, Kitty Empire of The Observer described the album as "a gem of opiated heartbreak".

== Track listing ==
All tracks are written by Josh Haden.

No.	Title	Length
1.	"It's So True"	4:32
2.	"Ten Nights"	6:11
3.	"Dreaming of Love"	5:38
4.	"Untitled #1"	6:40
5.	"Her Used-to-Been"	4:15
6.	"Ray of Light"	7:06
7.	"World of Blue"	14:13
8.	"I Lied"	5:08
9.	"Spiritual"	7:38
Total length:		61:21

== Personnel ==
Credits adapted from liner notes for The Blue Moods of Spain.

Spain

- Josh Haden – vocals, bass guitar, string arrangements
- Ken Boudakian – guitar, organ
- Merlo Podlewski – guitar
- Evan Hartzell – drums

Additional musicians

- Larry Cady – trumpet on "Ray of Light"
- Petra Haden – violin and vocals on "World of Blue", string arrangements
- Tanya Haden – cello on "World of Blue"
- Daniel Presley – string arrangements

Production

- Mike Bogus – engineering (assistant)
- Josh Haden – production
- Norman Kerner – engineering, mixing, production
- Daniel Presley – engineering, mixing
- Peter Slankster – engineering (assistant)

Artwork and design

- Ed Colver – photography
- Pat Dillon – art direction
