= The Family Songbook =

Studio album by The Haden Triplets
- Released: January 24, 2020
- Label: Trimeter

The Haden Triplets chronology
The Haden Triplets (2014)	The Family Songbook (2020)

Professional ratings
Aggregate scores
Source	Rating
Metacritic	81/100
Review scores
Source	Rating
AllMusic	4/5 stars

The Family Songbook is a studio album by American trio The Haden Triplets. It was released on January 24, 2020, through Trimeter Records. The album features four songs written by the triplets' paternal grandfather, Carl E. Haden. a Depression-era radio performer and one by their brother, Josh Haden.

== Track listing ==
The Family Songbook track listing
No.	Title	Writer(s)	Length
1.	"Wayfaring Stranger"	Traditional	5:27
2.	"Who Will You Love"	Carl Haden Jr.	5:53
3.	"Say You Will"	Jeff Bhasker, Kanye West	4:14
4.	"Ozark Moon"	Carl Haden Jr.	3:12
5.	"Flee as a Bird"	Mary Stanley Buce, Mary Dana Schindler	3:58
6.	"Memories of Will Rogers"	Carl Haden Jr.	3:17
7.	"Pretty Baby"	Emmylou Harris, Alison Krauss, Gillian Welch	1:55
8.	"Gray Mother Dreaming"	Ernie Harvey, Carl Haden Jr.	2:54
9.	"Every Time I Try"	Josh Haden	5:30
10.	"Wildwood Flower"	Joseph Philbrick Webster	3:09
11.	"What Would You Give"		4:43
12.	"I'll Fly Away"	Albert E. Brumley	3:33
