= Tough Guys Don't Dance =

Tough Guys Don't Dance may refer to:

- Tough Guys Don't Dance (novel), 1984 novel by Norman Mailer
- Tough Guys Don't Dance (film), 1987 film directed by Norman Mailer, based on his own novel
- Tough Guys Don't Dance (Soulsavers album), 2003 debut album from Soulsavers
- Tough Guys Don't Dance (High Contrast album), 2007 album by Welsh drum and bass producer High Contrast
