= She Haunts My Dreams =

Studio album by Spain
- Released: 1999
- Label: Restless
- Producer: Johan Kugelberg, Josh Haden

Spain chronology
The Blue Moods of Spain (1995)	She Haunts My Dreams (1999)	I Believe (2001)

She Haunts My Dreams is the second album by the American band Spain, released in 1999. The band was signed to DreamWorks Records shortly before the album's release, although Restless Records held Spain to its contract.

== Production ==
The album's songs were written by Josh Haden. They are mostly about romance and relationships. Joey Waronker played drums on the album; the piano parts were played by session musicians.

== Critical reception ==
Professional ratings
Review scores
Source	Rating
AllMusic	4/5 stars
The Encyclopedia of Popular Music	4/5 stars
Los Angeles Daily News	3.5/4 stars
Orange County Register	4/5 stars
Pitchfork Media	7.9/10
(The New) Rolling Stone Album Guide	3/5 stars
Spin	8/10
The Sun-Herald	7/10
The Sydney Morning Herald	4/5 stars

Spin called the album "a gorgeous meditation on romantic dysfunction." The Sydney Morning Herald praised the "muted-jazz/Leonard Cohen-knew-my-mother backing." USA Today concluded that "She Haunts My Dreams will be at the top of the list for a bunch of heartbroken losers come the end of the year."

The Sun-Herald wrote: "Stark, elegant and pervasively melancholic, Spain's lo-fi acoustic rumblings are purpose built for Haden's tales of woe." The Los Angeles Daily News noted that, "although plainly influenced by the Velvet Underground, Mazzy Star and the Tindersticks, the trio touches a hard-to-reach nerve with its wistful delivery and melancholic mood." The Virginian-Pilot listed it among the 10 best albums of 1999; The Dallas Morning News considered it to be one of the "9 Best Albums of '99 That Fell through the Cracks".

AllMusic deemed the album "dreamy, lounge-tinged pop." (The New) Rolling Stone Album Guide considered She Haunts My Dreams to be "artfully arranged mopiness."

== Track listing ==
No.	Title	Length
1.	"I'm Leaving You"
2.	"It's All Over"
3.	"Before It All Went Wrong"
4.	"Hoped and Prayed"
5.	"Waiting for You to Come"
6.	"Easy Lover"
7.	"Bad Woman Blues"
8.	"Nobody Has to Know"
9.	"Every Time I Try"
10.	"Our Love Is Gonna Live Forever"
