= The Haden Triplets =

Musical trio; triplet daughters of jazz double-bassist Charlie Haden

- Genres: Alternative country, neotraditional country, folk
- Labels: Third Man
- Members: Petra Haden; Tanya Haden; Rachel Haden
- Website: hadentriplets.com

The Haden Triplets, Petra, Tanya, and Rachel (born October 11, 1971, in New York City), are musicians who have performed individually in bands and together. They are the daughters of jazz double-bassist Charlie Haden and Ellen David.

The triplets, separately and together, have contributed to recordings and performances by the Foo Fighters, Queens of the Stone Age, Weezer, Beck, Green Day, Todd Rundgren, the Rentals, and Silversun Pickups. Petra and Rachel are former members of That Dog. The three had previously performed together live and as The Fates on Anaïs Mitchell's Hadestown.

In 2014, they released their first vocal album together, The Haden Triplets produced by Ry Cooder on Jack White's Third Man Records and it collects stripped-down, old-time country songs from the Carter Family, Bill Monroe, the Stanley Brothers, Webb Pierce, Kitty Wells, and the Louvin Brothers. On January 13, 2015, they performed together at Charlie Haden's Memorial Concert in New York City's Town Hall.

In 2020, they released a follow-up album, The Family Songbook.

== Discography ==
=== Albums ===
List of albums, with selected details
Title	Details
The Haden Triplets	Released: 2014; Format: CD, LP, digital; Label: Third Man Records
The Family Songbook	Released: 2020; Format: CD, LP, digital; Label: Thirty Tigers
