= Kubrick (album) =

Studio album by Soulsavers
- Released: 11 December 2015
- Studio: Various
- Length: 32:19
- Label: San Quentin
- Producer: Soulsavers

Soulsavers chronology
Angels & Ghosts (2015)	Kubrick (2015)	Imposter (2021)

Professional ratings
Aggregate scores
Source	Rating
AnyDecentMusic?	6.1/10
Metacritic	64/100
Review scores
Source	Rating
AllMusic	3.5/5 stars
The Guardian	3/5 stars
The Irish Times	4/5 stars
Mixmag	7/10
The Music	3/5 stars
MusicOMH	4/5 stars
Q	3/5 stars
Record Collector	2/5 stars
Renowned for Sound	4.5/5 stars
Uncut	3/5 stars

Kubrick is the sixth full-length studio album by English-American electronica production duo Soulsavers released by San Quentin Recordings label. The album consists of eight instrumental compositions and is dedicated to the works of Stanley Kubrick.

== Background ==
The album is self-produced and was recorded at a number of studios around the world. It is the duo's first solo album since 2009's Broken. The release consists of completely instrumental compositions without vocal parts—for the first time in the band's discography. The disc has been released both on vinyl and on a CD.

After several successful mini-tours with Dave Gahan in support of the previous album Angels & Ghosts in the USA and Europe, the duo decided to write new material for the release, but this time they did not invite other musicians or vocalists to join, as it was usual before. Stylistically continuing in many ways the previous albums, the musicians decided to focus on more orchestral arrangements. In a number of compositions, the guitars and drums are dramatically minimized, giving priority to the strings. The musicians did not give any performances to support of the album, and there were no singles released from the album. The album took 173rd place in the Belgian chart (Flanders).

== Critical reception ==
At Metacritic, that assigns a normalized rating out of 100 to reviews from mainstream critics, the album received an average score of 64, based on seven reviews, which indicates "generally favorable reviews". At AnyDecentMusic?, that collates critical reviews from more than 50 media sources, the album scored 6.1 points out of 10.

Sam Shepherd of musicOMH wrote "As an entirely instrumental album, Kubrick is to some degree new ground for the pair and, whilst they are certainly no strangers to the form, this is the first time they’ve produced an entire album with no vocals whatsoever. This time around, the focus is on the duo’s compositional acumen; no longer hidden by their fine choices of collaborators, they seize the opportunity, and positively soar.... Kubrick is an ambitious project, but one that works just perfectly as a showcase for the wonderful songwriting and compositional skills of Machin and Glover. It proves, as if it were ever in doubt, that their strength lies not in the skills of their collaborators, but in their music and ideas".

Paul Mardles of The Guardian stated "The sixth album by production team Rich Machin and Ian Glover aspires to emulate his movies’ atmosphere, its eight tracks named after Kubrick characters. Entirely instrumental, all woodwinds and strings, it is a sumptuous, often soothing set but too one-paced to be transportive".

== Track listing ==
All music is composed by Soulsavers.

No.	Title	Length
1.	"DeLarge"	5:22
2.	"Clay"	2:30
3.	"Torrance"	4:01
4.	"Dax"	4:59
5.	"Joker"	3:49
6.	"Hal"	4:37
7.	"Mandrake"	4:33
8.	"Ziegler"	2:31
Total length:		32:19

== Personnel ==
- Martyn LeNoble – bass
- Kevin Bales – drums
- James Walbourne – guitar
- Soulsavers – producing
- Geoff Pesche – mastering
- Daniele Luppi – orchestrating
- Steve Gullick – front cover
- The Hollywood Strings & Brass Ensemble – strings, horns

== Charts ==
Chart performance for Imposter
Chart (2015)	Peak position
Belgian Albums (Ultratop Flanders)	173
