= Unchained (Johnny Cash album) =

Studio album by Johnny Cash
- Released: November 5, 1996
- Recorded: 1995–1996
- Studios: Akademie Mathematique of Philosophical Sound Research (Hollywood); Sound City (Van Nuys, California); Ocean Way (Hollywood, California); NRG (Hollywood, California); Cowboy Arms (Nashville, Tennessee)
- Genre: Country rock
- Length: 41:11
- Label: American
- Producer: Rick Rubin

Johnny Cash chronology
The Road Goes on Forever (1995)	Unchained (1996)	VH1 Storytellers: Johnny Cash & Willie Nelson (1998)

American series chronology
American Recordings (1994)	Unchained (1996)	American III: Solitary Man (2000)

Singles from Unchained
- 1. "Rusty Cage" Released: October 22, 1996

Professional ratings
Review scores
Source	Rating
AllMusic	link
Robert Christgau	link
The Rolling Stone Album Guide	4/5 stars

Unchained (also known as American II: Unchained) is the 82nd overall album by the American country musician Johnny Cash, the second in his American series produced by Rick Rubin. It was released on November 5, 1996, through Rubin's American Recordings label. In contrast to the minimalist first American album (1994), Cash is backed by Tom Petty and the Heartbreakers on Unchained. It received a Grammy for Best Country Album and Cash was nominated for Best Male Country Vocal Performance for his version of "Rusty Cage."

== Background ==
While Cash's first album produced by Rubin featured only his voice and guitar, Cash is backed by Tom Petty and the Heartbreakers on Unchained. There are guest appearances by country music veteran Marty Stuart (additional guitar on more than half the songs); Flea (bassist from Red Hot Chili Peppers), on "Spiritual"; and by Lindsey Buckingham and Mick Fleetwood, both of Fleetwood Mac, on "Sea of Heartbreak".

Unchained focuses on cover songs written by other performers. In addition to three of Cash's own compositions, Unchained contained songs by Jude Johnstone ("Unchained"), Tom Petty ("Southern Accents"), Spain ("Spiritual"), Soundgarden ("Rusty Cage"), and Beck ("Rowboat"). The album also included a cover of the classic 1962 Hank Snow song, "I've Been Everywhere", written by Geoff Mack. From 2003 to 2009, Cash's version of "I've Been Everywhere" from this album Unchained has been used in several Choice Hotels commercials and has been the theme for these commercials. It was also used in a USPS commercial from 2021 to 2022. Cash's version of "I've Been Everywhere" has also been used as a soundtrack in Season 2 of the animated series The Grim Adventures of Billy & Mandy. According to biographer Robert Hilburn, Cash also recorded a cover version of Robert Palmer's "Addicted to Love" during the recording sessions for Unchained, but it was not released.

Cash recorded new versions of two songs he'd recorded decades earlier. "Country Boy" was featured on his 1957 debut album Johnny Cash with His Hot and Blue Guitar!. He recorded "Mean Eyed Cat" the 1960 album Johnny Cash Sings Hank Williams.

The album was recorded over a six-month period with engineer Sylvia Massy at Sound City Studios, among several other studios.

== Track listing ==
No.	Title	Writer(s)	Length
1.	"Rowboat" (Beck cover)	Beck	3:44
2.	"Sea of Heartbreak" (Don Gibson cover)	Paul Hampton, Hal David	2:42
3.	"Rusty Cage" (Soundgarden cover)	Chris Cornell	2:49
4.	"The One Rose (That's Left in My Heart)" (Jimmie Rodgers cover)	Del Lyon, Lani McIntire	2:26
5.	"Country Boy"	Johnny Cash	2:31
6.	"Memories Are Made of This" (Dean Martin cover)	Richard Dehr, Terry Gilkyson, Frank Miller	2:19
7.	"Spiritual" (Spain cover)	Josh Haden	5:06
8.	"The Kneeling Drunkard's Plea" (The Carter Sisters cover)	Maybelle Carter, Anita Carter, Helen Carter, June Carter Cash	2:32
9.	"Southern Accents" (Tom Petty and the Heartbreakers cover)	Tom Petty	4:41
10.	"Mean Eyed Cat"	Cash	2:33
11.	"Meet Me in Heaven"	Cash	3:21
12.	"I Never Picked Cotton" (Roy Clark cover)	Bobby George, Charles Williams	2:39
13.	"Unchained" (Jude Johnstone cover)	Jude Johnstone	2:51
14.	"I've Been Everywhere" (Lucky Starr cover)	Geoff Mack	3:16

== Personnel ==
Adapted from the album liner notes.

- Johnny Cash – vocals, acoustic rhythm guitar
- Tom Petty – vocals, acoustic guitar, electric guitar, bass, Chamberlin
- Mike Campbell – acoustic guitar, electric guitar, bass, mandolin, Dobro
- Marty Stuart – acoustic guitar, electric guitar, bass (1, 4–5, 10–14)
- Lindsey Buckingham – acoustic guitar (2)
- Howie Epstein – acoustic guitar, bass
- Flea – bass (7)
- Benmont Tench – piano, Hammond organ, Vox Continental organ, harmonium, Chamberlin
- Rick DePiro – piano, organ (8, 13)
- Steve Ferrone – drums and percussion (1–6, 10, 12, 14)
- Curt Bisquera – drums and percussion (7–8)
- Mick Fleetwood – percussion (2)
- Juliet Prater – percussion (3)

Production and technical staff

- Rick Rubin – producer
- David R. Ferguson – engineer
- Sylvia Massy – engineer, mixing
- John Ewing Jr., Greg Fidelman, Eddie Miller, Michael Stock – assistant engineers
- Gene Grimaldi, Eddy Schreyer – mastering (Oasis Mastering)
- Martyn Atkins – art direction, photography
- Christine Cano – art direction, design, photography, inlay photography
- Andy Earl – photography

== Charts ==
Album Chart	Peak position
US Billboard 200	170
US Top Country Albums (Billboard)	26
UK Country Albums (Official Charts)	4
Scottish Albums (Official Charts)	96
Swedish Albums (Sverigetopplistan)	23
Norwegian Albums (VG-lista)	20
German Albums (Offizielle Top 100)	96

== Certifications ==
Region	Certification	Certified units/sales
United States	—	221,000
