= Spain (band) =

American rock band

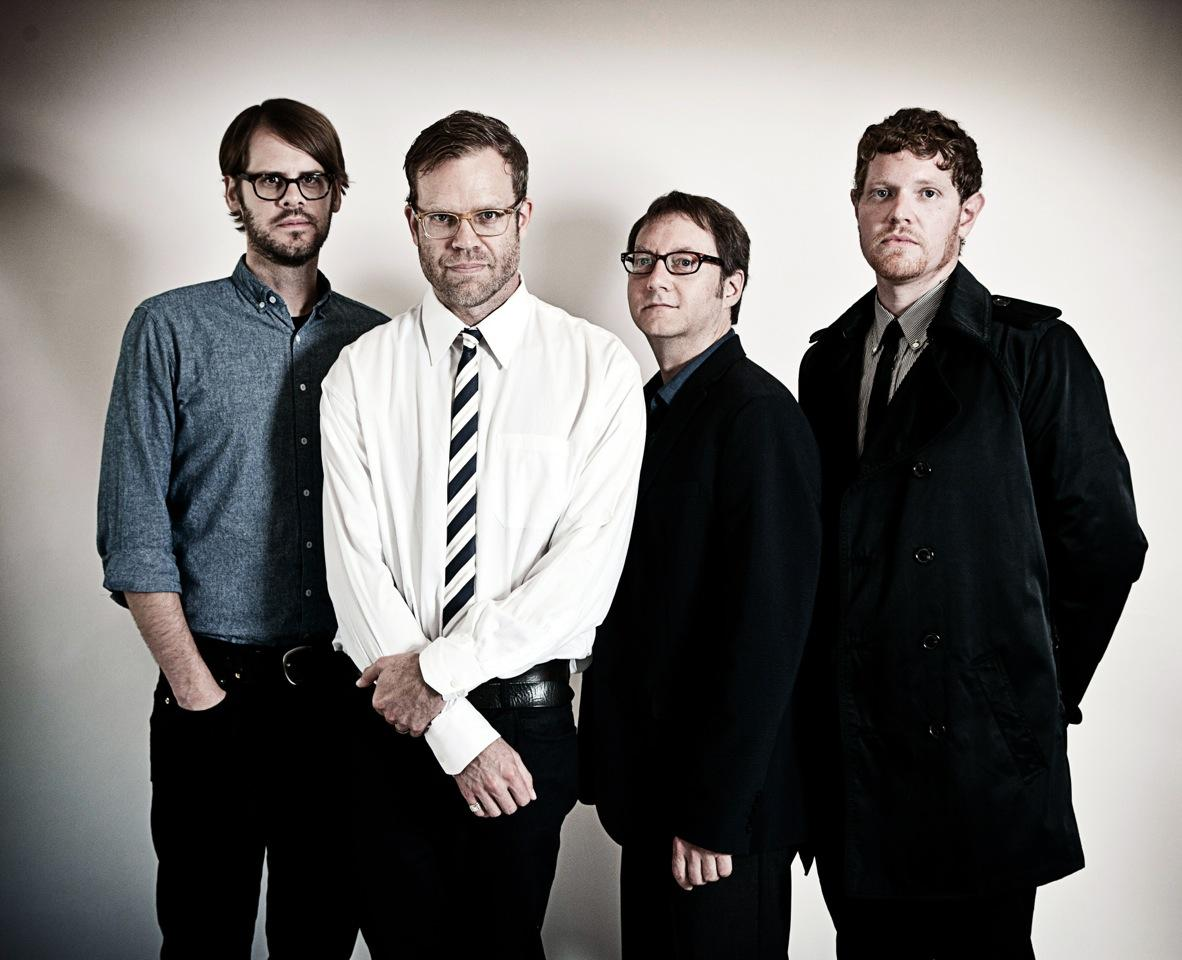
- Spain band in 2012

Background information
- Origin: Los Angeles, California, United States
- Genres: Indie rock, slowcore, dream pop, jazz rock, blues rock
- Years active: 1993–present
- Labels: Dine Alone Records, Glitterhouse Records, Restless Records
- Members: Josh Haden
- Past members: Randy Kirk; Matt Mayhall; Daniel Brummel; Evan Hartzell; Ken Boudakian; Merlo Podlewski
- Website: spaintheband.com

Spain are an American rock band formed in Los Angeles, California in 1993, and led by singer/bassist Josh Haden. Their syncretic music contains elements of country, blues, folk, jazz, and slowcore. In a career spanning three decades, Spain has released five studio albums, a live album, and a best-of collection.

== History ==
Spain's debut album, The Blue Moods of Spain, released in September 1995, featured the song "Spiritual", which has since become a standard, having been covered numerous times by artists including Johnny Cash, Soulsavers, Sean Wheeler and Zander Schloss, and by Haden's own father, jazz great Charlie Haden, who performed an instrumental version with jazz guitarist Pat Metheny on their acclaimed 1997 album Beyond The Missouri Sky (Short Stories). Spain's second album, She Haunts My Dreams, was recorded in 1999 on the Swedish island of Vaxholm, and contained performances by Swedish jazz pianist Esbjörn Svensson, guitarist Björn Olsson, and sometime R.E.M. and Beck drummer Joey Waronker. This album contained the song "Every Time I Try", which director Wim Wenders included in the soundtrack to The End of Violence. Spain's third album, I Believe, was released in 2001, and a compilation, Spirituals: The Best Of Spain, was released in 2003.

After a period of inactivity, Haden reformed the band with new members in 2007. This longest-running formation of the band crystallized with the lineup of Randy Kirk on keys and guitar, Matt Mayhall (of The Both) on drums, and Daniel Brummel on lead guitar and backing vocals. In 2012, this lineup released The Soul of Spain, the band's first new studio recording in 13 years, which "bears an undeniably brighter sound", and features performances by Josh's sisters Petra Haden, Rachel Haden, and Tanya Haden, now known professionally as The Haden Triplets.

The Soul of Spain received critical praise in the European press, and the group completed several European tours including performances in Belgium, Denmark, Norway, France, Germany, The Netherlands, Switzerland, Italy, Spain, Portugal, and the United Kingdom. During this period, Dylan McKenzie was added to the group as a touring member on acoustic guitar, and in 2013, the touring lineup recorded The Morning Becomes Eclectic Session, a live album recorded at KCRW which also features The Haden Triplets. In 2013, the lineup of Haden, Mayhall, Brummel and Kirk reconvened to record another studio full-length, Sargent Place, which was produced by Gus Seyffert, mixed by Darrell Thorp and released on Dine Alone Records on November 4, 2014. The album contains Charlie Haden's last recorded performance, the song "You and I", and was given a four-star rating by AllMusic. The full length Carolina followed on June 3, 2016, on Glitterhouse records, with Mayhall exiting the band at this point.

Between tours of Europe, the band began a weekly residency at Los Angeles's Love Song Bar in May 2016 that lasted through March 2017. The residency featured performances by many special guests, including Haden's sister Petra, jazz guitarist Bill Frisell, Sun Ra drummer Craig Haynes, Best Coast guitarist Bobb Bruno, former Circle Jerks bassist Zander Schloss, former Macy Gray saxophonist Matt DeMerritt, and violinist Lili Haydn. This led to the release of the live album Live at the Love Song on June 29, 2017, a compilation of the most memorable moments from the residency. This album is the first to feature guitarist and keyboardist Shon Sullivan as a member of the band. Their most recent studio album, Mandala Brush, followed on July 28, 2018, featuring many songs that had been developed during the Love Song residency. In the years since, Spain has periodically released new singles on their Bandcamp page along with releases of various live performances and World of Blue, an EP featuring five unreleased tracks from the Blue Moods of Spain sessions.

== Personnel ==
=== Current members ===
- Josh Haden (vocals, bass)
- Shon Sullivan (guitar, keyboards)
- Kenny Lyon (guitar)
- Jakob Høyer (drums)

=== Former members ===
- Matt Mayhall (drums)
- Daniel Brummel (guitar)
- Randy Kirk (keys, guitar)
- Dylan McKenzie (acoustic guitar)
- Evan Hartzell (drums)
- Ken Boudakian (guitar)
- Merlo Podlewski (guitar)
- Danny Frankel (drums)

== Discography ==
=== Albums ===
- The Blue Moods of Spain (Restless Records, 1995)
- She Haunts My Dreams (Restless Records, 1999)
- I Believe (Restless Records, 2001)
- Spirituals: The Best of Spain (Restless Records, 2003)
- Blue Moods of Spain: A History, Pt. 1 (Diamond Soul Recordings, 2010)
- Blue Moods of Spain: A History, Pt. 2 (Diamond Soul Recordings, 2011)
- The Soul of Spain (Glitterhouse Records, 2012)
- The Morning Becomes Eclectic Session (Glitterhouse Records, 2013)
- Sargent Place (Dine Alone/Glitterhouse Records, 2014)
- Carolina (Glitterhouse Records, 2016)
- Live at the Love Song (Live) (Glitterhouse Records, 2017)
- Mandala Brush (Glitterhouse Records, 2018)

=== Charted singles ===
List of charted singles, with selected chart positions
Title	Year	Peak chart positions	Album
Title	Year	AUS	Album
"Every Time I Try"	1997	60	She Haunts My Dreams
