= Par Avion (band) =

- Origin: California, United States
- Genres: Alternative rock
- Years active: 2004–present
- Members: Paul Avion, Zachary Ginder, Zandro Urbiztondo and Andrew Rivera
- Past members: Tanya Haden, Nick Lucero, Korel Tunador
- Website: http://www.paravionmusic.com

Par Avion is a SPIN.com pick band currently consisting of singer/guitarist/composer Paul Avion, bassist/composer Zachary Ginder, keyboardist/composer Zandro Urbiztondo and drummer Andrew Rivera.

== History ==
Par Avion was formed in 2004 in Los Angeles, and originally consisted of Tanya Haden (cellist, sister of Petra Haden, now wed to comedian Jack Black), Nick Lucero (a former drummer for Queens of the Stone Age), session musician Korel Tunador and Paul Avion.

Par Avion's first official EP release, in 2006, was produced by Scott Benzel, although earlier demos were recorded by Ben Mumphrey, producer of Frank Black & the Catholics Devil's Workshop EP.

The current line-up has been in existence since 2006, as the band has seen an evolution in a more 1990s direction, with some alt-country elements, as well.

Since then, the band has released a number of singles, such as "Stand Up, Be a Man" and "Fibromyalgia," which have appeared on PBS' Roadtrip Nation, Fuel TV's extreme sports show, The Daily Habit, and AMC's Hollywood Icon.

"Fibromyalgia," which was featured as a download on SPIN.com, appears to have been written about local musician Annie Hardy of Giant Drag, who suffers from the disease. In February 2009, Par Avion received further press in SPIN.

The band has also received press in College Music Magazine, Glasswerk UK, Sentimentalist Magazine and other outlets.

In June 2009, Under the Radar Magazine's Digital Sampler, Volume IX included the single "Art School Dropout" along with a number of bands from Sub Pop, Merge Records and Saddle Creek Records.

In late 2009, they received further write-ups in College News and in New York's Sentimentalist Magazine further likening their sound to that of the 1990s.

In January 2010, SPIN Earth announced the publication of a series of articles covering Paul Avion's trip to the slums of Kenya.

== Discography ==
- Pop Music United (as Paul Avion, 2006)
- Lonely Singles (2008)
- RU With Me (as Paul Avion)

== Videography ==
- "Pop Music United" (as Paul Avion, 2006)
- "Fibromyalgia" (as Paul Avion & Par Avion, 2009)

== Other appearances ==
- In April 2008, the song "Stand Up, Be a Man" by Paul Avion was featured on PBS' Roadtrip Nation.
- The song "Pop Music United II" (credited to Paul Avion appeared on Sonic Vogue's Sound of Style, Vol. II in 2008.
- The song "Stand Up, Be a Man" was featured on the compilation Groovetonics, Volume 2 in 2008.
- In September 2008, the song "Stand Up, Be a Man" was featured on Fuel TV's "The Daily Habit".
- In July 2009, "Pop Music United II" was featured on AMC's Hollywood Icon.
