= Anna (Anna Waronker album) =

Studio album by Anna Waronker
- Released: June 4, 2002
- Length: 41:39
- Label: Five Foot Two Records / Oglio Records

Professional ratings
Review scores
Source	Rating
Allmusic	3/5 stars

Anna is the debut solo album by that dog.'s Anna Waronker, released June 4, 2002.

== Track listing ==
No.	Title	Length
1.	"Love Story"	2:54
2.	"I Wish You Well"	3:35
3.	"Beautiful"	2:25
4.	"Nothing Personal"	3:10
5.	"John & Maria"	3:34
6.	"All for You"	2:45
7.	"Long Time Coming"	0:48
8.	"Fortunes of Misfortune"	3:41
9.	"How Do You Sleep?"	2:43
10.	"Perfect Ten"	3:43
11.	"A Hollow Daze"	3:38
12.	"Eat Me Alive"	2:37
13.	"The Powers That Be"	3:13
14.	"Goodbye"	2:53
