= I Can't Stay =

I Can't Stay may refer to:

- "I Can't Stay", a song by the Killers from Day & Age
- "I Can't Stay", a song by Soulsavers from The Light the Dead See
