= Tough Guys Don't Dance (Soulsavers album) =

Studio album by Soulsavers
- Released: 13 October 2003
- Recorded: 2002–2003
- Genres: Electronica; downtempo
- Length: 40:31
- Label: San Quentin Recordings
- Producer: Soulsavers

Soulsavers chronology
Tough Guys Don't Dance (2003)	It's Not How Far You Fall, It's the Way You Land (2007)

Professional ratings
Review scores
Source	Rating
Uncut	4/5 stars

Tough Guys Don't Dance is the debut studio album by English-American production team Soulsavers. The album was released in the UK on 13 October 2003. Spain lead singer Josh Haden sings vocals on the songs "Love", "Down So Low" and "Precious Time". Haden's own song "Spiritual" would later be covered by Mark Lanegan and Soulsavers on the duo's next album It's Not How Far You Fall, It's the Way You Land.

The song "Closer" was also released on the band's Closer EP on 22 November 2004.

== Track listing ==
No.	Title	Writer(s)	Length
1.	"Cabin Fever"	Machin, Glover	5:09
2.	"Love" (vocals by Josh Haden)	Machin, Glover, Haden	5:24
3.	"San Quentin Blues"	Machin, Glover	4:02
4.	"Rumblefish"	Machin, Glover	4:01
5.	"Down So Low" (vocals by Josh Haden)	Machin, Glover, Haden	4:33
6.	"Texas Taliban"	Machin, Glover	3:07
7.	"Closer"	Machin, Glover	5:52
8.	"Precious Time" (vocals by Josh Haden)	Machin, Glover, Haden	4:31
9.	"Blackout"	Machin, Glover	4:12

== Credits ==
- All songs produced by Soulsavers (Rich Machin and Ian Glover).
