= Alicia J. Rose =

American photographer, filmmaker, and musician

Alicia J. Rose is a photographer, filmmaker and musician based in Portland, Oregon. Rose has directed music videos for Cake, Corin Tucker, Bob Mould, Menomena, Laura Gibson and others. She completed her narrative short film debut The Gift of Gravity in 2014, and created the comedic web series The Benefits of Gusbandry. She directed her first feature film project, A Kaddish For Bernie Madoff (2021) in collaboration with poet/musician Alicia Jo Rabins. A photograph she took of Portland chef Naomi Pomeroy holding a dead pig received significant attention and was featured in numerous media outlets.

Rose is also a musician, known in her recording career as Miss Murgatroid, an accordionist, singer and drummer. She has released five full-length albums, three credited solely to Miss Murgatroid and two collaborations with vocalist and violinist Petra Haden entitled Bella Neurox and Hearts & Daggers. She plays accordion, synth and drums in the Portland band Party Witch with drummer Shawna Gore.

She is currently directing Menopunks, a documentary which features Gen X and middle-aged Riot Grrrl era musicians, including Pat Benatar and Neko Case, as they learn about misinformation surrounding menopause, and discuss their own experiences. She also founded the music festival Menopunkapalooza, celebrating the Menopunk movement and raising money for the documentary, in Portland in 2026. The first event featured Jody Bleyle of Team Dresch and Calamity Jane front woman Gilly Ann Hanner and other musicians. In October 2026, Rose and Menopunks is scheduled to go on tour with musical acts such as Heavens to Betsy and Calamity Jane. In addition to performances in Olympia, Washington, Washington D.C. and Philadelphia, they are scheduled to perform in New York City at the Bowery Ballroom. There is also a Menopunks podcast.
