= Petra Goes to the Movies =

Studio album by Petra Haden
- Released: January 22, 2013
- Recorded: 2012
- Label: ANTI-
- Producers: Petra Haden, Justin Burnett

Petra Haden chronology
Ten Years (2008)	Petra Goes to the Movies (2013)	Seemed Like a Good Idea (2016)

Petra Goes to the Movies is an album by Petra Haden.

== Music and release ==
The album was recorded in 2012 at John Kilgore Sound & Recording (New York, NY), Petra Haden's House (Los Angeles, CA), PJ Hanke Studios (Los Angeles, CA), The Body Shop (Los Angeles, CA), and Vox Recording Studios, (Los Angeles, CA). Some of the tracks feature Haden on both lead and backing vocals alone. Other tracks have guest musicians: pianist Brad Mehldau, guitarist Bill Frisell, and bassist Charlie Haden.

The album was released by ANTI- on January 22, 2013. Petra Haden gave public performances of material from the album early in 2013.

== Reception ==
Professional ratings
Review scores
Source	Rating
AllMusic	3.5/5 stars
PopMatters	7/10 stars

The AllMusic reviewer preferred the all-vocal tracks, because the others "sound a little too traditional and somewhat less interesting when compared to the rest of the album".

== Track listing ==
1. "Rebel Without a Cause" [From Rebel Without a Cause] – 2:50
2. "God's Lonely Man" [From Taxi Driver] – 2:00
3. "Cool Hand Luke Main Title" [From Cool Hand Luke] – 2:07
4. "Cinema Paradiso" [From Cinema Paradiso] – 3:00
5. "A Fistful of Dollars Theme" [From A Fistful of Dollars] – 1:51
6. "Psycho Main Title" [From Psycho] – 2:02
7. "Goldfinger Main Title" [From Goldfinger] – 2:10
8. "Carlotta's Galop" [From 8 1/2] – 3:00
9. "It Might Be You" [From Tootsie] – 5:15
10. "The Planet Krypton" [From Superman] – 1:21
11. "Superman Theme" [From Superman] – 3:54
12. "My Bodyguard" [From My Bodyguard] – 2:50
13. "Pascal's Waltz" [From Big Night] – 1:23
14. "Calling You" [From Bagdad Cafe] – 4:47
15. "Hand Covers Bruise" [From The Social Network] – 4:20
16. "This Is Not America" [From The Falcon and the Snowman] – 4:59

== Personnel ==
- Petra Haden – vocals

Guests

- Bill Frisell – guitar
- Charlie Haden – bass
- Brad Mehldau – piano
