= Angels & Ghosts =

Studio album by Dave Gahan and Soulsavers
- Released: 23 October 2015
- Genres: Alternative rock; blues rock; acoustic rock
- Length: 38:29
- Label: Columbia
- Producer: Soulsavers

Dave Gahan and Soulsavers chronology
The Light the Dead See (2012)	Angels & Ghosts (2015)	Kubrick (2015)

Dave Gahan chronology
The Light the Dead See (2012)	Angels & Ghosts (2015)	Imposter (2021)

Singles from Angels & Ghosts
- 1. "All of This and Nothing" Released: 11 September 2015; 2. "Shine" Released: 10 December 2015

Angels & Ghosts is the fifth studio album by English electronica production duo Soulsavers, released on 23 October 2015 by Columbia Records. It is their second collaboration with Dave Gahan, the frontman of Depeche Mode, as guest vocalist and songwriter, this time released under the moniker Dave Gahan & Soulsavers.

== Artwork ==
The cover photo was shot by Gahan's daughter Stella Rose.

== Release and promotion ==
The album was released as digital download, as well as CD and vinyl through Columbia on 23 October 2015. In support of the album, a tour with a 10-piece band followed with six shows in the US and Europe in late October and early November.

Pre-orders for the album started 11 September 2015.

The lead single from the album titled "All of This and Nothing" was released digitally 11 September 2015. A lyric video for the song was released on VEVO 10 September 2015.

The video for the second single "Shine" was premiered on 10 December 2015.

== Critical reception ==
Professional ratings
Aggregate scores
Source	Rating
AnyDecentMusic?	6.6/10
Metacritic	67/100
Review scores
Source	Rating
AllMusic	3.5/5 stars
The Guardian	3/5 stars
The Music	4/5 stars
The Observer	4/5 stars
Pitchfork	5.7/10
PopMatters	6/10
Renowned for Sound	2.5/5 stars
Rolling Stone	3.5/5 stars
RTÉ.ie	3/5 stars
Under the Radar	7/10

Angels & Ghosts received generally favourable reviews from critics. On Metacritic, which assigns a normalized rating out of 100 to reviews from mainstream publications, it received an average score of 67, based on 12 reviews. On AnyDecentMusic?, which collates critical reviews from more than 50 media sources, the album scored 6.6 points out of 10.

Kory Grow writing for the Rolling Stone stated, "The reason Angels & Ghosts works, though, is because Gahan and Soulsavers sound like a band... Gahan has always sounded like a complex individual with Depeche Mode, but on this set, he sounds set free." Alan Corr of RTÉ.ie mentioned, "Now a well-preserved 53, Dave Gahan has travelled a long way from his '90s nickname “The Cat”. He earned that sobriquet for his talent for cheating death but these days he channels his classic rock'n'roll story into brooding songs of redemption and rebirth." Jon Dennis in his review for The Guardian observed, "Gone are Depeche Mode’s shiny synths of yore: Angels & Ghosts’ default position is the doom-laden, mid-paced ballad. Gahan sings with unsparing emotional commitment against Soulsavers’ canvas of gospel-tinged backing vocals, ghostly organ and big minor chords." Lily Moayeri of Under the Radar added, "Once again, Gahan has turned himself inside out on these songs. He laments and beseeches by turns, giving Angels and Ghosts a gospel bent, which is enhanced by choir-like backing vocals. Organs further this spiritual aspect with their quaking tones..."

== Track listing ==
All songs written by Dave Gahan and Soulsavers.

No.	Title	Length
1.	"Shine"	3:40
2.	"You Owe Me"	4:22
3.	"Tempted"	4:19
4.	"All of This and Nothing"	4:17
5.	"One Thing"	4:40
6.	"Don't Cry"	4:43
7.	"Lately"	4:32
8.	"The Last Time"	3:57
9.	"My Sun"	3:59
Total length:		38:29

== Charts ==
Chart (2015)	Peak position
Austrian Albums (Ö3 Austria)	18
Belgian Albums (Ultratop Flanders)	31
Belgian Albums (Ultratop Wallonia)	9
Czech Albums (ČNS IFPI)	7
Dutch Albums (Album Top 100)	60
French Albums (SNEP)	33
German Albums (Offizielle Top 100)	5
Greek Albums (IFPI)	25
Hungarian Albums (MAHASZ)	19
Irish Albums (IRMA)	62
Italian Albums (FIMI)	7
Polish Albums (ZPAV)	3
Portuguese Albums (AFP)	29
Scottish Albums (Official Charts)	30
Spanish Albums (Promusicae)	46
Swedish Albums (Sverigetopplistan)	54
Swiss Albums (Schweizer Hitparade)	5
UK Albums (Official Charts)	27
US Heatseekers Albums (Billboard)	2
US Top Alternative Albums (Billboard)	23
US Top Rock Albums (Billboard)	31
