= Soulsavers =

English-American production and remix team

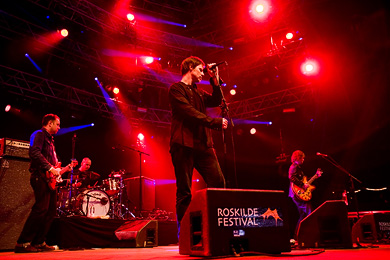
- Soulsavers and Mark Lanegan performing live at the Roskilde Festival, July 2007

Background information
- Origin: England / United States
- Genres: Alternative rock; electronica
- Years active: 2000–present
- Labels: V2; San Quentin Recordings; Mute
- Members: Rich Machin; Ian Glover; Dave Gahan
- Website: www.davegahan.com

Soulsavers (also known as The Soulsavers Soundsystem) is an English-American production and remix team composed of Rich Machin and Ian Glover. The Soulsavers' downtempo electronica sound incorporates influences of rock, gospel, soul, and country. To date, the duo has released six albums: Tough Guys Don't Dance in 2003, It's Not How Far You Fall, It's the Way You Land in 2007 (with Mark Lanegan and others), Broken in 2009 (again with Lanegan and guest vocalists), The Light the Dead See in 2012, Angels & Ghosts in 2015 and Imposter in 2021 (with Dave Gahan of Depeche Mode).

== History ==
=== Collaboration with Josh Haden: Tough Guys Don't Dance (2000–2005) ===
After a series of successful EP releases in 2000–2002, in 2003 they recorded their first studio album Tough Guys Don't Dance. The vocalist and co-author of three of the nine songs was Josh Haden—bassist and vocalist for Spain. The release was not successful either commercially or critically. After the release of the EP Closer in 2004, the musicians were engaged in mixing tracks for other artists.

=== Collaboration with Mark Lanegan: It's Not How Far You Fall, It's the Way You Land and Broken (2006–2009) ===
In 2006, collaboration begins with American singer, musician and songwriter—Mark Lanegan. On the It's Not How Far You Fall, It's the Way You Land album, his vocals are featured in eight of the eleven songs, and he is also featured as co-author of five songs. In addition, the album has a remake of Lanegan's song "Kingdoms of Rain", originally released on his 1994 album, Whiskey for the Holy Ghost. Soulsavers recorded an album in England and Lanegan completed his vocals in Los Angeles.

On the next Broken album, released on 17 August 2009, Lanegan's vocals are featured in nine out of thirteen songs, and he co-authored eight songs. Other prominent musicians such as Mike Patton (of Faith No More, Mr. Bungle, Tomahawk and other projects), Jason Pierce (of Spiritualized and Spacemen 3), Richard Hawley, and Gibby Haynes (of Butthole Surfers) also feature on the album. The non-album single "Sunrise", a song written by Lanegan and sung by Will Oldham, preceded the album release on 3 August 2009. The B-side is a cover of Palace Brothers' "You Will Miss Me When I Burn", a song written by Oldham and sung by Lanegan, that is also featured on the Broken album.

The pair have also worked as film score composers, such as on BattleGround: 21 Days on the Empire's Edge produced by the Guerrilla News Network.

Their song "Revival" was featured on the 22 November 2007 episode of Grey's Anatomy, titled "Crash into Me" part 1. The song was also featured on 10 December episode of Friday Night Lights, titled "Giving Tree". It is also featured in the snowboarding movie That's It, That's All. "Revival" also featured in the trailer of the 2011 film Machine Gun Preacher. "Kingdoms of Rain" featured in the Lie to Me episode "Truth or Consequences", which aired on 5 October 2009. They supported Depeche Mode during the European leg of their Tour of the Universe in late 2009.

=== Collaboration with Dave Gahan: The Light the Dead See, Angels & Ghosts and Imposter (2010–present) ===
In October to December 2009, Soulsavers supported Depeche Mode during a tour in support of their album Sounds of the Universe. The idea of collaboration between band members and Depeche Mode vocalist Dave Gahan was embodied in the 2012 album The Light the Dead See, consisting of ten songs and two instrumental tracks. Gahan wrote lyrics to all the songs on the album and performed lead vocals for them.

In May 2013 Soulsavers started to work on material for their up-and-coming fifth studio album in collaboration with Gahan. The album was released in October 2015 under the name Angels & Ghosts and in its support two singles were released—"All of This and Nothing" and "Shine". In addition, a mini-tour was organized in support of the new album (for the first time with Gahan), during which songs from The Light the Dead See were performed as well as some Depeche Mode and Gahan's solo material in the encore.

Shortly after a series of concerts in support of the album Angels & Ghosts, Machin and Glover had released the album Kubrick consisting of completely instrumental eight tracks (for the first time in the project's history). After that the collective suspended its activities.

On 12 November 2021, Soulsavers released the album Imposter.

== Discography ==
=== Albums ===
- Tough Guys Don't Dance (13 October 2003)
- It's Not How Far You Fall, It's the Way You Land (2 April 2007)
- Broken (17 August 2009)
- The Light the Dead See (21 May 2012)
- Angels & Ghosts (23 October 2015)
- Kubrick (4 December 2015)
- Imposter (12 November 2021)
- 20 (2023)

=== Singles and EPs ===
- Beginning to See the Dark EP (27 May 2002)
- "Revolution Song" (split 7-inch with Broadway Project) (31 March 2003)
- Closer EP (22 November 2004)
- "Revival" (30 April 2007)
- "Kingdoms of Rain" (20 August 2007)
- "Sunrise" (3 August 2009)
- "Death Bells" (14 September 2009)
- "Unbalanced Pieces" (2 November 2009)
- "Some Misunderstanding" (22 March 2010)
- "Longest Day" (2 April 2012)
- "Take Me Back Home" (20 August 2012)
- "All of This and Nothing" (11 September 2015)
- "Shine" (10 December 2015)
- "Metal Heart" (8 October 2021)

=== DJ mix albums ===
- In a Blue Room (2003)

=== Remixes/Reworks ===
- 2001 – Starsailor – "Goodsouls"
- 2002 – Doves – "Satellites"
- 2002 – Starsailor – "Poor Misguided Fool"
- 2003 – Broadway Project – "Sufi"
- 2004 – Starsailor – "Four to the Floor"
- 2005 – The Mothers – "Speak for Me"
- 2017 – Depeche Mode – "Poison Heart"
