= Imposter (album) =

Studio album by Dave Gahan and Soulsavers
- Released: 12 November 2021
- Recorded: November 2019
- Studio: Shangri-La (Malibu, California)
- Genre: Pop rock
- Length: 46:42
- Label: Columbia
- Producers: Rich Machin; Dave Gahan

Dave Gahan and Soulsavers chronology
| Angels & Ghosts (2015) | Imposter (2021) |

Dave Gahan chronology
| Angels & Ghosts (2015) | Imposter (2021) |

Soulsavers chronology
| Kubrick (2015) | Imposter (2021) |

Singles from Imposter
- 1. "Metal Heart" Released: 8 October 2021

Professional ratings
Aggregate scores
| Source | Rating |
|---|---|
| AnyDecentMusic? | 6.6/10 |
| Metacritic | 67/100 |
Review scores
| Source | Rating |
| AllMusic | 2.5/5 stars |
| Clash | 9/10 |
| Laut.de | 4/5 stars |
| Mojo | 3/5 stars |
| MusicOMH | 3.5/5 stars |
| Musikexpress | 4/6 stars |
| Record Collector | 4/5 stars |
| Rolling Stone (de) | 4/5 stars |
| Uncut | 3.5/5 stars |
| Under the Radar | 6/10 |

Imposter is the third collaborative studio album by English singer-songwriter Dave Gahan and electronica producer Soulsavers. It was released on 12 November 2021 by Columbia Records. The album also produced one single.

== Background ==
This is Gahan's fifth studio album and Soulsavers' seventh. Imposter was recorded live in Malibu, California in November 2019, consisting of cover versions of various rock songs. Dave Gahan has said of the album: "When I listen to other people's voices and songs—more importantly the way they sing them and interpret the words—I feel at home. I identify with it. It comforts me more than anything else. There's not one performer on the record who I haven't been moved by."

== Reception ==
At Metacritic, which assigns a normalized rating out of 100 to reviews from mainstream critics, the album received an average score of 67, based on six reviews, which indicates "generally favorable reviews". At AnyDecentMusic?, which collects critical reviews from more than 50 media sources, the album scored 6.6 points out of 10, based on seven reviews.

Ben Hogwood of musicOMH wrote, "In a wide range of interpretations, we are reminded of the extremes of this recognisable pop music voice, but are also given access to his vulnerable side. The singer himself will be 60 next year, and it is fascinating tracking the development of his voice over that time." Clash rated it 9 out of 10 and said that "an album that will become—in time—as significant and important to Gahan's career as Johnny Cash's 'American' series was to his enduring legacy." Neil Z. Yeung of AllMusic commented, "The resulting effort is mostly introspective, contemplative, and relaxing, but taken in another context, can be low energy and wearily sedate... While Imposter doesn't get the blood pumping as much as 2015's Angels & Ghosts, fans in need of a soundtrack for brooding will find this to be an ideal outlet." Lily Moayeri writing for Under the Radar mentioned, "In a way, the gravity and commitment to these appropriated songs makes them even more the property of Gahan & Soulsavers than their own original material. Be prepared for your heart to be wrenched out of your chest."

== Track listing ==
| No. | Title | Writer(s) | Original artist(s) | Length |
|---|---|---|---|---|
| 1. | "The Dark End of the Street" | Dan Penn; Chips Moman | James Carr | 2:35 |
| 2. | "Strange Religion" | Mark Lanegan | Mark Lanegan | 3:53 |
| 3. | "Lilac Wine" | James Shelton | Eartha Kitt | 4:14 |
| 4. | "I Held My Baby Last Night" | Elmore James | Elmore James | 3:35 |
| 5. | "A Man Needs a Maid" | Neil Young | Neil Young | 4:11 |
| 6. | "Metal Heart" | Chan Marshall | Cat Power | 4:46 |
| 7. | "Shut Me Down" | Rowland S. Howard | Rowland S. Howard | 4:20 |
| 8. | "Where My Love Lies Asleep" | Gene Clark | Gene Clark | 4:22 |
| 9. | "Smile" | Charlie Chaplin; John Turner; Geoffrey Parsons | Nat King Cole recorded the first version with lyrics | 3:28 |
| 10. | "The Desperate Kingdom of Love" | PJ Harvey | PJ Harvey | 2:55 |
| 11. | "Not Dark Yet" | Bob Dylan | Bob Dylan | 5:20 |
| 12. | "Always on My Mind" | Wayne Carson; Mark James; Johnny Christopher | Brenda Lee | 3:18 |
| Total length: | | | | 46:42 |

== Personnel ==
Band

- Dave Gahan – harmonica, vocals
- Kevin Bales – drums, percussion
- Travis Cole – vocals
- Tony Foster – guitar, pedal steel
- Ed Harcourt – piano
- Martyn Lenoble – bass (electric), bass (upright)
- Rich Machin – guitar, synthesizer
- Janet Ramus – vocals
- Sean Read – organ, piano
- Wendi Rose – vocals
- James Walbourne – guitar

Production

- Geoff Pesche – mastering
- Kaushlesh Garry Purohit – engineer
- Marta Salogni – mixing
- Eric Weaver – engineer

== Charts ==
Chart performance for Imposter
| Chart (2021) | Peak position |
|---|---|
| Austrian Albums (Ö3 Austria) | 11 |
| Belgian Albums (Ultratop Flanders) | 119 |
| Belgian Albums (Ultratop Wallonia) | 11 |
| Czech Albums (ČNS IFPI) | 42 |
| French Albums (SNEP) | 151 |
| German Albums (Offizielle Top 100) | 12 |
| Hungarian Albums (MAHASZ) | 27 |
| Italian Albums (FIMI) | 27 |
| Polish Albums (ZPAV) | 6 |
| Portuguese Albums (AFP) | 28 |
| Scottish Albums (Official Charts) | 25 |
| Spanish Albums (Promusicae) | 20 |
| Swiss Albums (Schweizer Hitparade) | 9 |
| UK Albums (Official Charts) | 65 |
