= A Kaddish for Bernie Madoff: The Film =

2021 American film by Alicia J. Rose

A Kaddish for Bernie Madoff
- Directed by: Alicia J. Rose
- Written by: Alicia J. Rose, Alicia Jo Rabins
- Produced by: Lara Cuddy
- Starring: Alicia Jo Rabins
- Cinematography: Asia Brown
- Music by: Alicia Jo Rabins
- Release date: March 5, 2021 (United States)
- Running time: 75 minutes
- Country: United States

A Kaddish for Bernie Madoff: The Film is a 2021 American musical documentary film directed by Alicia J. Rose and starring Alicia J. Rabins. It was based on the 2012 one-woman show created and written by Rabins.

== Synopsis ==
The film tells the story of fraudulent investor Bernie Madoff and the system that allowed him to pull off his pyramid scheme for decades – through interviews, ancient spiritual texts, and the unique perspective of an obsessed artist watching the events unfold from her residency in an abandoned office building in Manhattan's financial district.

== Cast ==
- Alicia Jo Rabins
- Robin McAlpine
- Judy Silk
- Lois Feuerle
- David Frank

== Production ==
A Kaddish for Bernie Madoff premiered at the 44th Portland International Film Festival. North American rights to the film were acquired by Freestyle Digital Media in August 2022.

== Recepetion ==
=== Critical reception ===
A Kaddish for Bernie Madoff was met with positive reviews from publications such as The Atlantic and The Forward. Kristi Turnquist of The Oregonian describes the film as "an original -- lyrical, emotional and thoughtful". A Kaddish for Bernie Madoff won the Terry Porter Visionary Award at the Sarasota Film Festival.

Elisabeth Vincentelli of The New York Times gave the film a less than positive review. She described A Kaddish for Bernie Madoff as a "hybrid of documentary, memoir and musical-mystical essay" and stated that it felt "shaggily shapeless, as if Rabins and Rose were unsure what, exactly, they were trying to say".
