= Golem (klezmer band) =

American rock-klezmer band

- Origin: New York City
- Genres: Klezmer; punk rock; folk rock
- Years active: 2000–present
- Labels: Discos Corason
- Members: Annette Ezekiel Kogan; Aaron Diskin; Curtis Hasselbring; Jeremy Brown; Taylor Bergren-Chrisman; Tim Monaghan
- Past members: Alicia Jo Rabins, Sarah Ferholt, Barry Negrin

Golem is a rock-klezmer band from New York City. They mix traditional Eastern European Jewish music with original material sung in Yiddish, English, Russian, as well as Ukrainian, French, Serbo-Croatian, and Romany. The group describes itself as "Where Eastern Europe Meets the Lower East Side" and uses avant-garde spectacle to both challenge and embrace the stylistic norms of klezmer music.

== Music ==
Golem's music is both traditional and irreverent. Annette Ezekiel Kogan formed Golem in 2000. Before even putting the band together she contacted David Krakauer, who was then curating the weekly "Klezmer Brunch" at the downtown venue Tonic, and asked him for a gig. Krakauer agreed, and Ezekiel Kogan put together the first lineup for Golem’s debut.

Golem recorded its first EP Golem in 2001, followed by the self-produced full-length albums Libeshmertzn (Love Hurts) (2002) and Homesick Songs (2004).

In June, 2005, Golem recreated a "mock wedding", based on an old Catskills’ tradition, at the Knitting Factory in New York. An entire Jewish wedding ceremony took place before 200 "guests", complete with rabbi, chuppah, wedding party, and bride and groom in drag. The event was featured on the front page of the NY Times Arts section.

In 2005, Golem signed with Jdub Records and remained with them until the label closed in 2011. Golem released two albums on Jdub: Fresh Off Boat (2006) and Citizen Boris (2009), both produced by Emery Dobyns (Patti Smith, Antony and the Johnsons).

Numerous guest artists participated in Golem’s recordings, including Amanda Palmer, Lenny Kaye, Mike Gordon and Brandon Seabrook.

In June, 2014, Golem released the album Tanz, produced by Tony Maimone (Pere Ubu) on the Mexican world music label, Discos Corasón (Buena Vista Social Club).

Golem performed live on an episode of Season 4 of Louis CK’s acclaimed television comedy, Louie, in June 2014. In 2017 Golem performed live on VICELAND show The Untitled Action Bronson Show. In 2020 Golem was a featured in S1E7 of Amazon's Hunters and S1E4 of Netflix' Dash & Lily.

== Discography ==
=== Studio albums ===
- Golem (debut EP) (2001)
- Libeshmertzn (Love Hurts) (2002)
- Homesick Songs (2004)
- Fresh Off Boat (2006)
- Citizen Boris (2009)
- Tanz (2014)

=== Music videos ===
- "Warsaw is Khelm" (2006)
- "Charlatan-Ka" (2008)
- "Freydele" (2014)
- "Chervona Ruta" (2015)
- "Vodka Is Poison" (2016)

=== Compilations and soundtracks ===
- Ukraine do Amerika (2008)
- Generation P (2011)
- Russendisko (2012)
- Putumayo’s A Jewish Celebration (2013)
