= Broken (Soulsavers album) =

Studio album by Soulsavers
- Released: 17 August 2009
- Recorded: 2008–2009
- Studios: Glenwood Place Studios, Los Angeles; The Hobby Shop, Los Angeles; Mike Patton's place, San Francisco; Gibby Haynes' place, New York City; Dustin O'Halloran's place, Berlin; Strongroom, London; Assault and Battery, London; Casa G, London; First Love Studios, Nottingham; Highfield St. Studios, Liverpool; 301 Studios, Sydney
- Genres: Electronica; alternative rock; gospel
- Length: 64:52
- Labels: V2; Cooperative Music
- Producer: Soulsavers

Soulsavers chronology
It's Not How Far You Fall, It's the Way You Land (2007)	Broken (2009)	The Light the Dead See (2012)

Mark Lanegan chronology
Sunday at Devil Dirt (2008)	Broken (2009)	Blues Funeral (2012)

Singles from Broken
- 1. "Sunrise" / "You Will Miss Me When I Burn" Released: 3 August 2009; 2. "Death Bells" Released: 14 September 2009; 3. "Unbalanced Pieces" Released: 2 November 2009; 4. "Some Misunderstanding" Released: 22 March 2010

Broken is the third full-length studio album by English-American production team Soulsavers, and their second album predominantly featuring Mark Lanegan as lead vocalist. The album was released by V2 and Cooperative Music in the UK on 17 August 2009, and released by Columbia Records in the US in September 2009 as a digital download.

Broken features a roster of guest musicians, including Mike Patton, Gibby Haynes, Richard Hawley, Jason Pierce, Richard Warren and Dustin O'Halloran. In addition to Lanegan, the album also includes several songs featuring Australian singer-songwriter Rosa Agostino, who performs under the moniker Red Ghost, as lead vocalist.

== Background ==
As with their 2007 album It's Not How Far You Fall, It's the Way You Land, a collaboration with Mark Lanegan and a host of guest vocalists, Broken once again features Lanegan as the primary vocalist, as well as contributions from Bonnie "Prince" Billy (Will Oldham), Jason Pierce (of Spiritualized and Spacemen 3), Mike Patton (of Faith No More), Richard Hawley, and Gibby Haynes (of Butthole Surfers). The non-album single "Sunrise", a song written by Lanegan and sung by Will Oldham, preceded the album release on 3 August 2009. The AA-side is a cover of Palace Brothers' "You Will Miss Me When I Burn", written by Oldham and sung by Lanegan, that also features on the album. Additionally, the album features a cover of Gene Clark's 1974 opus "Some Misunderstanding", and a cover of Lanegan's own "Praying Ground" from his 1998 album Scraps at Midnight.

In a press release for the album, Rich Machin described Broken as the result of Soulsavers' live incarnation. "Touring has definitely brought the guitars to the front of Broken and it's got a more soulful twist too. And though it clearly has some very dark overtones, I don't think it's quite as dark as the last. The album was recorded over 2008 and 2009 in Los Angeles and North England, and also features the vocals of newcomer Red Ghost, the performing moniker of Rosa Agostino. According to Rich, "This young Australian girl from Sydney kept on sending me demos... and she was better than most everything else we'd heard. We traded ideas, and it really gelled."

== Critical reception ==
Professional ratings
Aggregate scores
Source	Rating
AnyDecentMusic?	7.6/10
Metacritic	78/100
Review scores
Source	Rating
Clash	8/10
Drowned in Sound	9/10
The Guardian	4/5 stars
The Line of Best Fit	80%
MusicOMH	4.5/5 stars
NME	8/10
Pitchfork	6.3/10
PopMatters	7/10
The Scotsman	4/5 stars
The Times Online	5/5 stars

Critical response to Broken was positive. At Metacritic, which assigns a normalised rating out of 100 to reviews from mainstream critics, the album has received an average score of 78, based on 11 reviews.

== Track listing ==
No.	Title	Writer(s)	Vocals	Length
1.	"The Seventh Proof"	Ian Glover, Rich Machin	instrumental	3:03
2.	"Death Bells"	Glover, Lanegan, Machin, Richard Warren	Mark Lanegan and Gibby Haynes	4:50
3.	"Unbalanced Pieces"	Glover, Lanegan, Machin	Mark Lanegan and Mike Patton	4:07
4.	"You Will Miss Me When I Burn"	Will Oldham	Mark Lanegan and Red Ghost	3:48
5.	"Some Misunderstanding"	Gene Clark	Mark Lanegan	7:57
6.	"All the Way Down"	Glover, Lanegan, Machin	Mark Lanegan	4:49
7.	"Shadows Fall"	Glover, Lanegan, Machin, Warren	Mark Lanegan and Richard Hawley	6:36
8.	"Can't Catch the Train"	Glover, Lanegan, Machin	Mark Lanegan	3:34
9.	"Pharaoh's Chariot"	Glover, Lanegan, Machin	Mark Lanegan and Jason Pierce	4:32
10.	"Praying Ground"	Mike Johnson, Lanegan, Keni Richards	Red Ghost	3:44
11.	"Rolling Sky"	Glover, Lanegan, Machin	Mark Lanegan and Red Ghost	7:05
12.	"Wise Blood"	Glover, Machin	instrumental	5:37
13.	"By My Side"	Rosa Agostino, Glover, Machin	Red Ghost	5:15

iTunes bonus tracks
No.	Title	Writer(s)	Vocals	Length
14.	"Sunrise"	Lanegan	Will Oldham	3:41
15.	"Highway Kind"	Townes Van Zandt	Mark Lanegan	2:48

Japanese bonus tracks
No.	Title	Writer(s)	Vocals	Length
14.	"Highway Kind"	Van Zandt	Mark Lanegan	2:51
15.	"Death Bells" (Mogwai Remix)	Glover, Lanegan, Machin, Warren	Mark Lanegan	5:00

== Charts ==
Chart (2009)	Peak position
Belgian Albums (Ultratop Flanders)	28
Dutch Albums (Album Top 100)	58
UK Albums (Official Charts)	78

== Singles ==
- "Sunrise" / "You Will Miss Me When I Burn" (7" vinyl, 3 August 2009)
  1. "Sunrise" (Lanegan) – 3:42
  2. "You Will Miss Me When I Burn" (Oldham) – 3:48
- "Death Bells" (digital download, 14 September 2009)
  1. "Death Bells" – 4:49
  2. "Death Bells" (Mogwai Remix) – 4:59
- "Unbalanced Pieces" (promo CD and music video only, 2 November 2009)
  1. "Unbalanced Pieces" (Radio Edit) – 3:58
- "Some Misunderstanding" (promo CD only, 22 March 2010)
  1. "Some Misunderstanding" (Radio Edit) – 4:07

== Credits ==
Musicians

- All music by Rich Machin and Ian Glover.
- Strings arranged by Daniele Luppi.
- Mark Lanegan – vocals on tracks 2–9 and 11.
- Rosa Agostino – vocals on tracks 4, 10, 11, and 13.
- Jason Pierce – vocals on track 9.
- Mike Patton – vocals on track 3.
- Richard Hawley – vocals on track 7.
- Gibby Haynes – vocals on track 2.
- Wendi Rose, Carmen Smart, T'jae Cole, and Eleanor Palmer – vocals on tracks 5–7.
- Dustin O'Halloran – additional piano on tracks 4 and 8.
- Martyn LeNoble – additional bass on tracks 5–7, 9, and 13.
- Kev Bales – additional drums on tracks 2, 5, 7, 11, and 12.
- Ian Compton – additional organs on tracks 5, 7, and 10.
- Ray Dickaty – additional saxophone on tracks 2, 3, and 11.
- Anton Riehl – additional cedar flute on track 12.
- Sonus Quartet – additional strings on tracks 1, 5, 7–9, 12, and 13.
- Rich Warren – additional guitar on tracks 2, 5–7, 9–11 and 13; additional bass on track 2; and additional harmonica on track 7.

Production

- Produced by Soulsavers.
- Mixed by Danton Supple and Soulsavers, except "Death Bells" mixed by Soulsavers.
- Mastered by Mike Marsh at The Exchange.
- Engineered by Eric Weaver, Josh Blanchard, Anton Riehl, Peter Fletcher, Phil Hartley, and Mike Morgan.
- Recorded 2008–2009 at:
  - Glenwood Place Studios and The Hobby Shop, Los Angeles
  - Mike Patton's place, San Francisco
  - Gibby Haynes' place, New York
  - Dustin O'Halloran's place, Berlin
  - Strongroom; Assault and Battery; Casa G; First Love Studios; Highfield St., England
  - 301 Studios, Sydney
- Design by Ryan Besch at Hero Design Studio.
- Live audio engineer for '09 tour – John Lee Hardee
