= The Light the Dead See =

Studio album by Soulsavers
- Released: 21 May 2012
- Recorded: 12 November 2010 in Los Angeles, New York, London, Berlin, Sydney & Stoke-on-Trent
- Genres: Alternative rock, blues rock, acoustic rock, electronica
- Length: 44:01
- Labels: V2 Records, Mute US
- Producer: The Soulsavers

Soulsavers chronology
Broken (2009)	The Light the Dead See (2012)	Angels & Ghosts (2015)

Dave Gahan chronology
Hourglass (2007)	The Light the Dead See (2012)	Angels & Ghosts (2015)

Singles from The Light the Dead See
- 1. "Longest Day" Released: 2 April 2012; 2. "Take Me Back Home" Released: 20 August 2012

Professional ratings
Aggregate scores
Source	Rating
AnyDecentMusic?	6.8/10
Metacritic	73/100
Review scores
Source	Rating
AllMusic	4/5 stars
Consequence of Sound	C+
The Guardian	4/5 stars
Mojo	4/5 stars
MusicOMH	4.5/5 stars
NME	4/5 stars
PopMatters	6/10
Spin	8/10
Sputnikmusic	4/5 stars
Uncut	7/10

The Light the Dead See is the fourth full-length studio album from English electronica production duo Soulsavers, released by V2 Records in the UK on 21 May 2012, and by Mute in the US on 22 May 2012. The album title comes from a poem by Frank Stanford. The album is a collaboration with Dave Gahan, the frontman of Depeche Mode, as guest vocalist. Gahan sings and wrote the lyrics on all non-instrumental songs on the album.

== Release and promotion ==
The album was released as CD and digital download on 21 May 2012. The LP version was delayed to 2 July 2012, due to quality problems in the vinyl pressing.

The first single taken from the album, "Longest Day", was released as digital download on 2 April 2012. A limited etched 7" vinyl version of the single, with only 300 copies pressed, was released on Record Store Day 20 April 2012.

The second single "Take Me Back Home" was released as digital download on 20 August 2012. An official music video was released from the track, directed by High 5 Collective. The video doesn't feature the artists themselves, but a story of life and loss.

Originally there were no plans to tour in support of the album, since Dave Gahan was going to the studio late March 2012 to start working on the next Depeche Mode record. However, the band played an invite-only "secret show" at Capitol Studios in Los Angeles on 21 July 2012. The full set of seven songs at Capitol was recorded and the 30-minute concert video "Live in Hollywood" has been streaming exclusively at the Rolling Stone website since 13 December 2012. According to Rich Machin, it will be available as a limited edition DVD in Europe early 2013.

Soulsavers premiered a music video for the track "Take". It was released on 28 February 2013 via Clash Music. The video was directed by filmmaker Bernhard Wittich.

== Critical reception ==
The album received generally positive reviews from music critics. At Metacritic, which assigns a normalized rating out of 100 to reviews from mainstream critics, the album received an average score of 73, based on 11 reviews, which indicates "generally favorable reviews".

David Von Bader in his review for Consequence of Sound stated, "The Light the Dead See is an album you listen to late at night, possibly in the dark, and absolutely alone. With a dash of Nick Cave and a shade of Scott Walker, the disc is a reminder of why Soulsavers’ atmospheric hymns work so well and have earned spots in countless film and television scores." Dave Simpson of The Guardian wrote, "Dave Gahan was a deep personal well of darkness: six minutes spent clinically dead following an overdose in 1996; a cancerous tumour in 2009. He draws on it extensively here... There's tenderness, too, but Gahan's brooding power is central to possibly his best work since Depeche's 1990 Violator: magnificent songs about demons and failings, morality and mortality, regret, faith and devotion." Hamish MacBain of NME added, "Dave Gahan (who provides all vocals here) and mainman Rich Machin have spoken about how much they have re-energised each other, and it shows. Initially it’s strange to hear that instantly identifiable baritone clashing with organic, rough-edged guitars, dirty Hammond organ, and delicate strings rather than the cold electronics of the day job, but it soon reveals itself to be a perfect pairing."

== Track listing ==
All lyrics are written by Dave Gahan; all music is composed by Rich Machin, Ian Glover.

No.	Title	Length
1.	"La Ribera" (Instrumental)	1:51
2.	"In the Morning"	3:33
3.	"Longest Day"	4:14
4.	"Presence of God"	3:45
5.	"Just Try"	4:03
6.	"Gone Too Far"	3:12
7.	"Point Sur Pt. 1" (Instrumental)	1:41
8.	"Take Me Back Home"	4:06
9.	"Bitterman"	4:51
10.	"I Can't Stay"	5:02
11.	"Take"	3:45
12.	"Tonight"	3:58
Total length:		44:01

== Credits ==
Musicians

- Dave Gahan: lead vocals, all lyrics; harmonica on tracks 11 12
- Rich Machin, Ian Glover (Soulsavers): all music
- Daniele Luppi: string arrangements on tracks 1 2 3 4 5 7 8 9
- Dustin O'Halloran: additional piano on track 11
- Kev Bales: additional drums on tracks 2 3 6 8 9 10 12
- Martyn LeNoble: additional bass on tracks 2 3 8 9 12; additional guitar on tracks 8 12
- Sean Read: additional organ on tracks 2 4 6 8 9 12
- Tony Foster; additional guitar on tracks 1 2 3 5 6 9 10 11 12; additional harmonica on track 1
- Ed Harcourt: additional harmonium & piano on track 3; additional guitar on track 12
- Mark Lanegan: backing vocals on track 2
- Wendi Rose, Janet Ramus; backing vocals on tracks 3 5 6 8 9 10 11
- Tjae Cole: backing vocals on 3 5 8 9 10
- Sonus Quartet: strings on tracks 1 2 3 4 5 7 8 9
- Anne Carruthers: cello on tracks 10 12
- Hannah Philip: violin on tracks 10 12
- Rosa Agostino: backing vocals on track 12
- Ben Edwards: flugel on tracks 3 & 9; trumpet on track 9
- Mike Kearsey: trombone on tracks 3 & 9

Production

- Produced by Soulsavers
- Mixed by Danton Supple & Soulsavers
- Mastered at Abbey Road Studios by Geoff Peche
- Recorded at:
  - Sunset Sound, Selma Sound, 11AD – Los Angeles
  - The Mouse House, Casa G, Mute hq, Strongrooms – UK
  - Schlaf Klänge Studios – Berlin
  - Studios 301 – Sydney
- Dave Gahan vocals recorded at Madpan Studios NYC & Blanco Studio NYC by Kurt Uenala
- Engineered by Kurt Uenala, David "Saxon" Greenep, Anton Riehl, Michael Morgan, Vincent Jones, Jay Marcovitz, Hannes Plattmeier, Alain Johannes, and Tony Foster

== Charts ==
Chart (2012)	Peak position
Austrian Albums Chart	49
Belgian Albums Chart (Flanders)	35
Belgian Albums Chart (Wallonia)	37
French Albums Chart	120
German Albums Chart	12
Swiss Albums Chart	30
Polish Albums Chart	23
UK Albums Chart	69
US Top Heatseekers Albums Chart	28
