= Broadway Project =

British electronic musician

- Birth name: Dan Berridge
- Origin: Bristol, England
- Genres: Ambient, jazz, hip hop
- Years active: 2000–present
- Labels: Memphis Industries, Grand Central
- Website: Official website

Broadway Project is the pseudonym for the British electronic musician Dan Berridge, who hails from Bristol, England. Reviewers often describe the music as "cinematic" and it combines elements of ambient, jazz and hip hop. The epic nature of his records has led to him being commissioned to write scores for a number of feature films and British television programs. He has released three albums to date and scored the music for five feature films.

== Discography ==
- Compassion (2000, Memphis Industries, Cat no.: MI014CD)
- Compassion (2001, Eighteenth Street Lounge Music, Cat no.: ESL046)
- For the One EP (2002, Memphis Industries)
- The Vessel (2003, Memphis Industries, Cat no.: MI031CD)
- In Finite (30 May 2005, Grand Central Records, Cat no.: GCCD140)
- One Divided Soul (2009, ODS Recordings)
- Better Things Original Soundtrack (2009, ODS Recordings)
- Here is Always Somewhere Else - The Life of Bas Jan Ader Original Soundtrack (2009, ODS Recordings)
- One Divided Remix (2009, ODS Recordings)

A second version of Compassion was released in 2002, with an additional disc containing early singles and rarities (cat no. MI014CD2).
