= That Dog =

American rock band

- Origin: Los Angeles, California, U.S.
- Genres: Indie rock; slacker rock; power pop
- Years active: 1992–1997; 2011–present
- Labels: DGC; UMe
- Members: Rachel Haden; Tony Maxwell; Anna Waronker
- Past members: Petra Haden

That Dog (stylized as that dog.) is a Los Angeles-based rock band that formed in 1992 and disbanded in 1997, reuniting in 2011. The band originally consisted of Anna Waronker on lead vocals and guitar, Rachel Haden on bass guitar and vocals, her sister Petra Haden on violin and vocals, and Tony Maxwell on drums.

The band's original work drew critical comparisons with the output of Redd Kross, Wednesday Week, Dolly Mixture and Buzzcocks.

== History ==
=== Formation ===
Lead vocalist Anna Waronker is the daughter of record industry mogul Lenny Waronker and singer Donna Loren, and the sister of drummer Joey Waronker of Beck, R.E.M. and Atoms for Peace. She is married to Steve McDonald of Redd Kross. Petra and Rachel Haden are daughters of jazz bassist Charlie Haden.

The group began when Anna and a friend, Jenni Konner, began writing short punk songs in her bedroom about boys. Waronker had known Petra and Rachel Haden since high school. Maya Rudolph was the band's original drummer, before moving to attend college, after which mutual friend Tony Maxwell took over.

=== Releases and Touring ===
Their self-titled first album was originally released on a limited run as a double 7" on the independent label Magnatone Records in 1992. It was soon after re-released on cassette and compact disc by Geffen. During this time, the band was good friends with, often played on records by, and toured with label mates Beck and Weezer. Members contributed to the Beck songs "Girl of My Dreams", "Totally Confused" and the single "Steve Threw Up", as well as Weezer's "I Just Threw Out the Love of My Dreams", all released as B-sides by the aforementioned artists.

1995 saw the release of Totally Crushed Out! to little fanfare. The band's members also contributed to several tracks on Mike Watt's Ball-Hog or Tugboat? record.

On April 8, 1997, That Dog released their third album, Retreat from the Sun, and added Kenny Woods (Steven McDonald Group, Beck, Anders & Woods) on guitar. Retreat from the Sun spawned the group's only charting radio hit, "Never Say Never", which reached No. 27 on the U.S. Billboard Modern Rock charts in 1997.

That year the band toured the US with various acts including, Blur, The Wallflowers, and Counting Crows.

=== Dissolution and other projects ===
The group issued a formal statement announcing their disbandment in September 1997. Since that time, all the members of the band have kept active in the music business. Anna Waronker has contributed music to soundtracks and released her solo debut album, Anna, in 2002 on her own Five Foot Two Records label; she released her second solo album, California Fade, in 2011. Petra Haden has released two solo albums: 1999's Imaginaryland and 2005's Petra Haden Sings The Who Sell Out in which she reinvents The Who's classic 1967 album as a cappella. In 2005, she joined The Decemberists as a full-time member, but no longer plays with the band. Petra Haden has also contributed vocals and violin to recordings by many artists including Green Day, Bill Frisell, Miss Murgatroid, and The Rentals. Rachel Haden has contributed vocals to albums by Jimmy Eat World, Say Anything, Ozma and Nada Surf, and was also a member of the reformed version of The Rentals (featuring ex-Weezer bassist Matt Sharp) for a brief period. Tony Maxwell has worked as a composer, most notably on the films Chuck & Buck and The Good Girl (both written by Mike White).

Anna Waronker and her band frequently play clubs in the Los Angeles area. Petra and Rachel have sporadically gigged with third sister Tanya (the three are triplets) as the Haden Triplets.

=== Reunion ===
On June 21, 2011, after a few months of the band having an official presence on Facebook, the band used their page to announce a reunion show on August 26 at the Troubadour in Los Angeles. A second show was added for the 28th due to demand; both shows sold out. Openers for the shows included Tenacious D and a Prince cover band led by Maya Rudolph, who like Petra and Rachel Haden was a member of The Rentals. The band announced additional reunion shows for 2012: Two shows at Largo at the Coronet in Los Angeles on April 13 (the second show was added after the first sold out), and performances in Brooklyn, New York, on May 24–25, 2012, at the Music Hall of Williamsburg. The announcement for the Los Angeles shows stated that the band would be performing with an expanded string section, and would feature some songs never performed before.

On May 25, 2012, The Village Voice published an interview with Anna Waronker where she hinted that there may be new music from the band in the future. In 2017, Waronker, Rachel Haden and Maxwell indicated that they were in the process of recording a fourth album. Petra Haden declined to participate in the recording process, opting not to continue with the band.

On August 21, 2019, the band announced that their fourth studio album, Old LP would be released on October 4, 2019. A music video for "Just the Way" was released on October 2, 2019.

== Band members ==
=== Current members ===
- Anna Waronker – lead vocals, guitar (1992–1997, 2011–present)
- Rachel Haden – bass guitar, vocals (1992–1997, 2011–present)
- Tony Maxwell – drums (1992–1997, 2011–present)

=== Former member ===
- Petra Haden – violin, vocals (1992–1997, 2011–2017)

== Discography ==
=== Studio albums ===
Year	Details
1994	That Dog: Released: March 1, 1994; Label: DGC; Formats: CD, cassette, LP
1995	Totally Crushed Out!: Released: July 18, 1995; Label: DGC; Formats: CD, CS, LP
1997	Retreat from the Sun: Released: April 8, 1997; Label: DGC; Formats: CD, CS, LP
2019	Old LP: Released: October 4, 2019; Label: UMe; Formats: LP, digital download

=== Extended plays and singles ===
- That Dog double 7" (1993) Magnatone
- Buy Me Flowers 7" (1993) Guernica
- "Old Timer" (1994) DGC
- Waldo the Dog Faced Boy/That Dog split 10" (1994) WIN Records
- Grunge Couple 7" (1994) self-released
- "He's Kissing Christian" (1995) DGC
- "Never Say Never" (1997) DGC
- "If You Just Didn't Do It" (2019) UMe

=== Compilation appearances ===
- DGC Rarities: Volume 1 (1994) DGC – "Grunge Couple"
- Volume Nine (1994) Volume Magazine – "One Summer Night" (alternate version)
- Jabberjaw: Good to the Last Drop (1994) Mammoth Records – "Explain"
- The Poop Alley Tapes (1995) WIN Records – "Ridiculous"
- Spirit of '73: Rock for Choice (1995) Epic/550 Music – "Midnight at the Oasis" (Maria Muldaur)
- A Small Circle of Friends: A Germs Tribute (1996) Grass Records – "We Must Bleed" (Germs)
- Hear You Me! A Tribute to Mykel and Carli (1998) Vast Records – "Silently" (acoustic version)

=== Music videos ===
- "Old Timer" (1994, directed by Spike Jonze)
- "He's Kissing Christian" (1995, directed by Frank Sacramento)
- "Never Say Never" (1997, directed by Mark Kohr)
- "Just the Way" (2019, directed by Casey Storm)
