= Alicia Jo Rabins =

American writer and musician

- Occupations: Poet; Scholar; Musician

Alicia Jo Rabins is a performer, musician, singer, composer, poet, writer, and Jewish scholar. She lives in Portland, Oregon, in the United States. Her use of language and words is central to her work: "Words may be the closest we get to immortality as humans. Death has no power over those words. Geography has no power over them. They transmit something beyond any one, or any community's, lifetime." She played violin for eight years in the rock-klezmer band Golem.

== Biography ==
She got her B.A. in English and creative writing at Barnard College, received an M.F.A. in poetry from Warren Wilson College, an M.A. in Jewish gender and women's studies from the Jewish Theological Seminary, and studied for two years at the Pardes Institute of Jewish Studies in Jerusalem.

During the Fall 2016 session, she taught a course, "Arts and Jewish Experience: Exploring Diverse American Identities through Art", at Portland State University.

In 2014, Rabins performed "A Kaddish for Bernie Madoff". She has performed at: Webster Hall, New York City (October 27, 2008); "A Kaddish for Bernie Madoff", Portland State University (May 2014); University of North Carolina at Asheville (March 6, 2018); and The Poetry Project, New York City (November 26, 2018). Rabins and her work has been featured in The New York Times, Literary Mama, the Jewish Women's Archive, Lilith, The Forward, Tablet, Oregon Public Broadcasting, and more.

Jo Rabins is married to bassist Aaron Hartman and has two children.

== Discography ==
- Sugar Shack (2003)
- Girls in Trouble (2009)
- Half You Half Me (2011)
- Open the Ground (2015)

== Filmography ==
- A Kaddish for Bernie Madoff: The Film

== Publications ==
=== Books ===
- Divinity School
- Fruit Geode

=== Writings ===
- A Passover Story

== Awards ==
- 2015 Honickman Book Prize Winner
