= Josh Haden =

American musician and singer (born 1968)

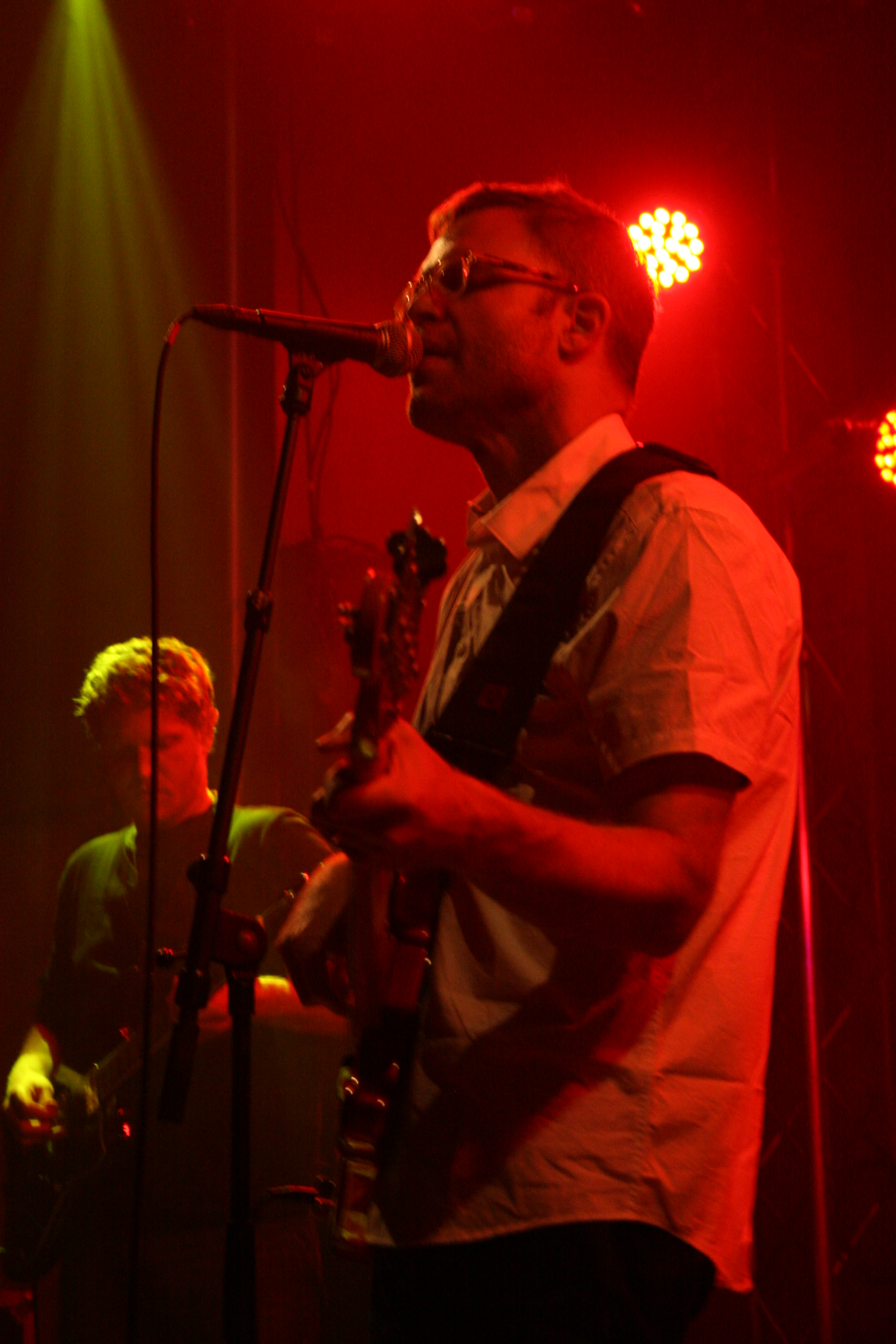

Background information
- Born: 1968 (age 57–58); New York City, New York, U.S.
- Origin: Los Angeles, California, U.S.
- Genres: Indie rock, slowcore, jazz rock, alternative rock
- Instruments: Vocals, bass
- Father: Charlie Haden
- Relatives: Petra Haden (sister); Tanya Haden (sister); Rachel Haden (sister); Jack Black (brother-in-law)

Josh Haden (born 1968 in New York City) is an American musician and singer. He is the founder, bassist and singer of the group Spain. Haden is the son of Charlie Haden and Ellen David.

== Career ==
Haden is the founder, bassist and singer of the group Spain, whose first album, The Blue Moods of Spain, appeared on Restless Records to wide acclaim. The band toured extensively in the U.S., Europe, and Australia, attracting considerable notice.

Other credits include Handsome Boy Modeling School (on which he performed a duet with Sean Lennon).

His most recent projects were the 2004 Light of Day EP, released on Diamond Soul Recordings, and his debut solo LP, Devoted, released in 2007, produced by Dan the Automator and featuring performances by former Spain guitarist Merlo Podlewski, keyboardist John Medeski, and turntablist Kid Koala. He also sang vocals on the track Persona on Blue Man Group's album The Complex.

His song "Spiritual", from The Blue Moods of Spain, has been covered by Johnny Cash, Soulsavers, Midnight Choir, and the duo of his father Charlie Haden and Pat Metheny.

== Personal life ==
Based in Los Angeles, he is the brother of the Haden Triplets Petra (that dog., Foo Fighters, The Decemberists, Sean Lennon), Tanya (Silversun Pickups, Let's Go Sailing; who married comedian Jack Black in 2006), and Rachel (that dog., The Rentals).

== Discography ==
- with Spain : see the band's discography
- solo :
  - Light of day (EP, 2004)
  - Devoted (2007)
  - World of Blue I (released 21 September 2016)
  - solo project under the name Dead Sea Scrolls (no album released yet)
