= Tony Maxwell =

American musician

- Birth name: Anthony D. Maxwell
- Born: June 3, 1968 (age 56); United States
- Genres: Indie rock; alternative rock; post-punk
- Instrument: Drums

Anthony D. Maxwell (born June 3, 1968) is an American musician. From 1991 to 1997, he was the drummer for the band that dog., for which he also played for a 2019 reunion album, Old LP. After the breakup of the band, he worked as composer on the films Chuck & Buck and The Good Girl. He is also a frequent collaborator with director Spike Jonze; He was one of the dancers in Weezer's "Buddy Holly" video directed by Jonze himself, he played the Dog character, named Charles, in Jonze's video for Daft Punk's "Da Funk" and "Fresh", he choreographed the Dance of Despair in Jonze's Being John Malkovich, and he was Nicolas Cage's body double in Jonze's Adaptation.
