= Tanya Haden =

American artist and musician (born 1971)

- Born: October 11, 1971 (age 54); New York City, U.S.
- Occupations: Artist, musician, singer
- Years active: 2001–present
- Spouse: Jack Black (m. 2006)
- Children: 2
- Father: Charlie Haden
- Musical career
- Instruments: Cello; vocals

Tanya Haden Black (born October 11, 1971) is an American artist, musician, and singer. She is one of the triplet daughters of jazz bassist Charlie Haden and Ellen David. She is married to actor and musician Jack Black.

== Career ==
Born in New York City, she was a member of several bands, including Let's Go Sailing, and is the creator of the Imaginary Bear puppet show. Haden has contributed to recordings of a number of Los Angeles musicians, including vocals and cello on Par Avion's EP, Pop Music United. Her father was the jazz double bassist Charlie Haden. Haden is the triplet sister of bassist Rachel Haden and violinist Petra Haden, and the three have performed as the Haden Triplets. Their brother is bassist-singer Josh Haden, leader of the group Spain.

She received her MFA degree from California Institute of the Arts, where she majored in experimental animation. She continues her work in visual art and has exhibited in several shows including one at the Las Cienegas Projects in 2010. In 2015, Haden was picked up by Rosamund Felsen Gallery where she had a one-artist exhibition showing drawings.

Haden plays cello extensively in the Los Angeles area including performing as an additional member of the band Silversun Pickups. She also plays the cello on their Pikul EP, which was released in 2005. Haden has also recorded with the Los Angeles indie folk band Sea Wolf and played cello on Los Angeles based rock band The Warlocks album Surgery in 2005.

Tanya, with her sisters Petra and Rachel, known as The Haden Triplets, released their first album on February 4, 2014. The album includes the sisters singing in harmony. The record was produced by Ry Cooder and also features the sisters on their respective instruments. The album is being released on Third Man Records which was founded by musician Jack White.

== Personal life ==
Haden met actor Jack Black when they were students at Crossroads School, a private high school in Santa Monica. Although the two attended the private high school together, they did not begin dating until spring 2005. The two married on March 14, 2006, in Big Sur, California. She gave birth to their first son on June 10, 2006, at Cedars-Sinai Medical Center in Los Angeles. Their second son was born on May 23, 2008. Both Black and Haden decided to raise the children Jewish.

According to Aaron Freeman (Gene Ween), the Ween song "Stay Forever" was written for Haden.
