= Petra Haden =

American violinist & singer (born 1971)

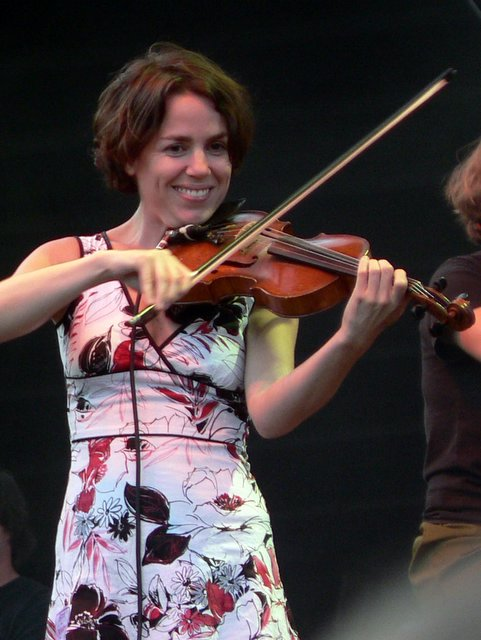
- Petra Haden with The Decemberists in 2005

Background information
- Born: October 11, 1971 (age 54); New York City, New York, U.S.
- Genres: Pop; rock
- Occupations: Singer; musician
- Instruments: Violin; vocals; mandolin
- Years active: 1992–present
- Labels: True North; Bar/None; Sunnyside; Anti-; Tzadik; Win Records; Winter & Winter; Sovereign Artists
- Website: petrahaden.com

Petra Haden (born October 11, 1971) is an American musician and singer.

She is the daughter of the jazz bassist Charlie Haden and Ellen David, and is the triplet sister of bassist Rachel Haden (her bandmate in that dog.) and cellist Tanya Haden (married to singer and actor Jack Black); she has performed with her sisters as The Haden Triplets. She is also the sister of bassist-singer Josh Haden, leader of the group Spain.

== Biography ==
Haden has been a member of That Dog, Tito & Tarantula, the Decemberists, and If by Yes.

Over the course of her career, Haden has contributed to recordings by Bill Frisell, the Twilight Singers, Beck, Mike Watt, Luscious Jackson, Sun Kil Moon, Foo Fighters, Green Day, Weezer, the Rentals, Victoria Williams, Yuka Honda, the Gutter Twins, Sunn O))), Cornelius and the Nick Haywood Trio.

In New York City, in 1996, she released her first album, Imaginaryland, consisting mostly of original a cappella music. In 2000, Petra was struck by a car while crossing a street in Los Angeles; the resulting injuries forced her out of performance for several months.

In 2005, she released the home-recorded album Petra Haden Sings: The Who Sell Out, a complete a cappella rendition of The Who Sell Out by The Who. The project was suggested to Haden by longtime friend Mike Watt, who also gave her the eight-channel multi-track cassette recorder she used to make it. Funded in part by a Durfee grant and a desire to perform the work live, Haden created a new arrangement of The Who Sell Out for a ten-woman a cappella choir called Petra Haden & The Sellouts. The premiere live performance of the full work occurred in July 2005 at the John Anson Ford Amphitheatre as a part of the "sound." concert series.

She has also released a self-titled collaboration with jazz guitarist Bill Frisell.

She contributed to the recording of ØØ Void by drone metal band Sunn O))) and played on the debut and follow up album of Sunn O))) guitarist Greg Anderson's other doom metal band Goatsnake. She collaborated with Anderson again in 2022 on the album Devotional. Haden lends vocal chants and other wordless touches to the heavy drone supplied by Anderson.

The Haden Triplets sang the part of the Fates in Anaïs Mitchell's 2010 release Hadestown on Righteous Babe Records.

In 2007, Haden recorded an a cappella cover of Journey's "Don't Stop Believin'" for the compilation album Guilt by Association Vol. 1. This arrangement of the song is very similar to that used in the Glee version of the song in 2009.

She performed on the soundtrack to the film An American Crime, starring Catherine Keener and Elliot Page, which premiered on Showtime in May 2008.

In 2009, Toyota commissioned Haden to perform three songs for television commercials for the third-generation Toyota Prius, including an a cappella version of the Bellamy Brothers 1970s song "Let Your Love Flow" and worked as an arranger and vocal coach on The Sing Off on NBC, alongside Deke Sharon.

Haden played violin on "Sentimental Tune" by Tegan and Sara, off their album Sainthood (released October 27, 2009).

In 2011, Haden formed the group If By Yes with Yuka Honda, the culmination of an eight-year songwriting collaboration. The band released one album, Salt on Sea Glass. Other band members included Yuko Araki on drums and Hirotaka “Shimmy” Shimizu on guitar, with contributions from David Byrne and Nels Cline.

In 2014, she worked on a collaboration with Jim Bianco in Hooray Matinee. The resulting tracks were released on a number of digital outlets.

In 2015, she provided vocals for the rock mockumentary "Gentle & Soft: The Blue Jean Committee Story", the 1st season finale of the IFC series Documentary Now! (starring Fred Armisen & Bill Hader). Haden's voice was used as the falsetto of Blue Jean Committee bassist Clark Honus (played by Hader). Haden even appeared live with Armisen & Hader as "The Blue Jean Committee" on Late Night With Seth Meyers, with Hader lip-synching to Haden's vocals.

Also in 2015, Haden again collaborated with Bill Frisell, providing vocals on his 2016 album When You Wish Upon A Star.

In 2016, the song "Easy Street" by The Collapsable Hearts Club, which featured Haden and Jim Bianco, played throughout The Walking Dead episode "The Cell". A few hours after the episode's broadcast, the song rose to number 92 in the UK Singles Chart.

In 2021, Petra Haden teamed up with Australian double-bassist Nick Haywood to release the album Back to the Garden with the Nick Haywood Trio.

== Discography ==
=== Albums ===
List of albums, with selected details
Title	Details
Imaginaryland	Released: 1996; Format: CD; Label: WIN Records (WIN019)
Bella Neurox (with Miss Murgatroid)	Released: 1999; Format: CD; Label: WIN Records (WIN032)
Petra Haden & Bill Frisell (with Bill Frisell)	Released: 2004; Format: CD; Label: Skip Records (SKP 9044-2)
Petra Haden Sings: The Who Sell Out	Released: 2005; Format: CD; Label: Bar/None (BRN-CD-160)
Hearts and Daggers (with Miss Murgatroid)	Released: 2008; Format: CD, digital; Label: File Under Music (FUM003)
The Windmills of Your Mind (with Paul Motian & Bill Frisell & Thomas Morgan)	Released: 2011; Format: CD, digital, LP; Label: Winter & Winter
Petra Goes to the Movies	Released: January 2013; Format: digital; Label: Anti
Seemed Like a Good Idea (with Jesse Harris)	Released: April 2016; Format: digital; Label: Sunnyside
Behind The Shade (James Williamson and the Pink Hearts featuring Frank Meyer and Petra Haden	Released: June 2018; Format: CD, digital, LP; Label: Leopard Lady Records (LLR008)
Harmony (with Bill Frisell, Hank Roberts & Luke Bergman)	Released: October 2019; Format: digital; Label: Caldo Verde
Joey Always Smiled (with Mark Kozelek)	Released: October 2019; Format: digital; Label: Caldo Verde
Songs for Petra (John Zorn and Jesse Harris featuring Petra Haden)	Released: August 2020; Format: digital; Label: ABC
Songs from My Father (with Nick Haywood Quintet)	Released: September 2020; Format: digital; Label: ABC
Back to the Garden (with Nick Haywood)	Released: September 2021; Format: digital; Label: Nick Hayward
Devotional (with The Lord)	Released: October 2022; Format: digital; Label: Southern Lord

== Awards and nominations ==
=== ARIA Music Awards ===
The ARIA Music Awards is an annual awards ceremony that recognises excellence, innovation, and achievement across all genres of Australian music. They commenced in 1987.

Year	Nominee / work	Award	Result	Ref.
2021	Songs from My Father (with Nick Haywood)	Best Jazz Album	Nominated	
