= Rachel Haden =

American musician (born 1971)

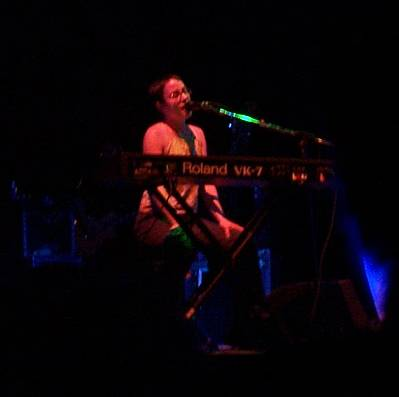
- Haden playing with Jimmy Eat World, 2001

Background information
- Born: October 11, 1971 (age 55); New York City
- Instruments: Vocals; bass; drums; keyboards
- Member of: That Dog
- Formerly of: The Rentals

Rachel Haden (born October 11, 1971 in New York City) is an American musician and one of the triplet daughters of the jazz bassist Charlie Haden and Ellen David.

== Career ==
In the early 1990s, Haden played bass guitar for That Dog, a band that also included her sister Petra. Her sister Tanya also contributed cello on several That Dog recordings, but did not tour as an official member of the band. Around this time Haden also played drums and performed backup vocals for Beck on the songs "Totally Confused" and "Steve Threw Up". She also played drums for Beck's "Pink Noise (Rock Me Amadeus)".

Later, Haden became one of the four early members of the band the Rentals, along with Rod Cervera and Weezer's Patrick Wilson and Matt Sharp. In 1996, she sang on the Weezer song "I Just Threw Out the Love of My Dreams".

The Weezer songwriter, Rivers Cuomo, planned Haden to perform the part of Laurel on Weezer's rock opera album Songs from the Black Hole. After Weezer abandoned the album, Haden recorded vocals for "I Just Threw Out the Love of My Dreams", released in 1996 as a B-side to Weezer's single "The Good Life".

In 1999, Haden contributed a cover of the song "Poems, Prayers, and Promises" to the album A Tribute to John Denver. Around this same time, she played bass and performed vocals as a member of The Martinis, along with Pixies guitarist Joey Santiago and his wife Linda Mallari. In 1999 Haden also contributed backing vocals on "Snoother" by the For Carnation on their eponymous album.

In 2001, Haden toured as a backup singer and keyboardist for Jimmy Eat World and is credited on their album Bleed American released that same year. She contributed vocals to the Dntel album Life Is Full of Possibilities. In 2004, Haden, along with her sisters Petra and Tanya, recorded a set of traditional country songs as the Haden Triplets with their longtime friend and former Dieselhed member Zac Holtzman, currently of the band Dengue Fever.

In 2004, she contributed backing vocals for four songs on Lucky Pierre's ThinKing album. She continued to make music in the Los Angeles area, including with sister Petra's a cappella choir the Sell Outs and as a member of the most recent lineup of The Rentals. Haden performed the female vocals for the duet "Heartache Vs Heartbreak" from Ozma's 2007 album Pasadena. She also performed the female vocals on the Fightstar album One Day Son, This Will All Be Yours. She sings backing vocals on the tracks "Unfamiliar Ceilings", "You & I", and the new b-side "Gracious".

Haden can also be heard doing vocals throughout comedian Neil Hamburger's foray into music, the album Neil Hamburger Sings Country Winners. She duets with Hamburger on the song "Please Ask That Clown To Stop Crying". She also contributed her vocals for a duet with Japanese alternative rock band Asian Kung-Fu Generation, the song "Hello, Hello".

Haden toured with Todd Rundgren in late 2008, temporarily replacing longtime Rundgren bassist and collaborator Kasim Sulton, who at the time was touring with Meat Loaf. She played bass guitar and sang backing vocals for Brendan Perry on his 2010 Ark tour. In 2010 under the billing "The Haden Triplets," Haden joined her sisters Petra and Tanya to sing the role of the Fates in Anaïs Mitchell's folk-opera, Hadestown. In 2011, she collaborated with Nerdcore group Supercommuter for the song "#1 Kyabajo" on their album Products of Science. Also in 2011, she contributed the track "I like Luci (demo)" to the various artists compilation, Kat Vox: A CD To Celebrate 20 Years of timmi-kat ReCoRDS on timmi-kat ReCORDS. In 2023, Haden recorded "Raging Bull’s Jaw", a duet with Mark Kozelek of Sun Kil Moon.
