= Jazzbühne Berlin '88 =

Live album by Ornette Coleman and Prime Time
- Released: 1990
- Recorded: June 5, 1988
- Venue: Friedrichstadt-Palast, Berlin
- Genre: Jazz-funk
- Length: 58:42
- Label: Repertoire; RR 4905-C

Jazzbühne Berlin '88 is a live album by Ornette Coleman and his band Prime Time. It was recorded on June 5, 1988, at the Friedrichstadt-Palast in Berlin, and was released in 1990 by Repertoire Records as Volume 5 of their Jazz Bühne Berlin / Rundfunk der DDR series.

According to the album credits, Coleman appears on alto saxophone, trumpet, and vocals, and is joined by guitarists Bern Nix and Charles Ellerbee, bass guitarists Al McDowell and Chris Wilker, and drummers Calvin Weston and Denardo Coleman. However, as per Richard Cook and Brian Morton, authors of The Penguin Guide to Jazz, "eagle-eyed fans were quick to point out the inconsistency between the liner photo" taken during the concert, which shows a different band, "and the putative line-up" listed in the sleeve credits. Critic Howard Mandel noted that, by the time of the concert, Prime Time had undergone a shake-up, leaving only a handful of the original members in place. Coleman biographer John Litweiler lists the personnel as Coleman, Chris Rosenberg and Ken Wessel on guitar, Al MacDowell and Chris Walker on bass guitar, Denardo Coleman on drums, and Badal Roy on tablas, which agrees with the proposed lineup suggested by Cook and Morton.

== Reception ==
Professional ratings
Review scores
Source	Rating
AllMusic	2/5 stars
The Penguin Guide to Jazz	2/4 stars
The Virgin Encyclopedia of Jazz	3/5 stars

In a review for AllMusic, Brian Olewnick wrote: "The group's interaction sounds thin and almost routine; little inspiration is heard either in their solos or massed activity... the absence of incredible musicians like Don Cherry, Charlie Haden, and Ed Blackwell and the telepathic interplay they shared with Coleman is a loss that makes itself felt with virtually every note."

The authors of The Penguin Guide to Jazz Recordings stated: "this is a messy, congested performance that reduces 'Song X' to adolescent 'heaviness', 'Dancing in Your Head' to drearily repetitive techno-jazz-funk... very much a record for fans of a 'you had to be there' persuasion."

== Track listing ==
All compositions by Ornette Coleman.

1. "Song X" – 5:48
2. "Music News" – 7:22
3. "Chanting" – 2:40
4. "Honeymoon" – 5:47
5. "Realing the Fealing" – 8:01
6. "Singing in the Shower" – 9:08
7. "Dancing in Your Head" – 10:05
8. "Bourgeoise Boogie" – 9:51

== Personnel listed in album credits ==
- Ornette Coleman – alto saxophone, trumpet, vocals
- Bern Nix – guitar
- Charles Ellerbee – guitar
- Al McDowell – bass guitar
- Chris Wilker – bass guitar
- Calvin Weston – drums
- Denardo Coleman – drums

== Correct personnel ==
- Ornette Coleman – saxophone, trumpet, vocals
- Chris Rosenberg – guitar
- Ken Wessel – guitar
- Al MacDowell – bass guitar
- Chris Walker – bass guitar
- Badal Roy – tabla
- Denardo Coleman – drums
