= List of free funk musicians =

The following is a list of free funk musicians.

== B ==
- Lester Bowie

== C ==
- James Chance
- Steve Coleman
- Ornette Coleman

== D ==
- Jack DeJohnette

== H ==
- Doug Hammond
- Human Arts Ensemble

== J ==
- Ronald Shannon Jackson
- Juju

== O ==
- Greg Osby

== P ==
- Ponga

== R ==
- Ned Rothenberg

== T ==
- Craig Taborn
- Jamaaladeen Tacuma
- Gary Thomas

== U ==
- James "Blood" Ulmer

== W ==
- Cassandra Wilson
