= Body Meta =

Studio album by Ornette Coleman
- Released: 1978
- Recorded: December 19, 1976
- Genre: Free funk
- Length: 39:22
- Label: Artists House
- Producer: Ornette Coleman

Ornette Coleman chronology
Soapsuds, Soapsuds (1977)	Body Meta (1978)	Of Human Feelings (1982)

Body Meta is an album by Ornette Coleman and Prime Time, released in 1978.

== Reception ==
Professional ratings
Review scores
Source	Rating
AllMusic	4/5 stars
The Penguin Guide to Jazz Recordings	4/4 stars
The Rolling Stone Jazz Record Guide	4/5 stars
The Village Voice	A−

Robert Christgau wrote: "Hidden in Coleman's dense electric music are angles deep enough to dive into and sharp enough to cut your throat. This isn't quite as dense or consistent as Dancing in Your Head -- 'Fou Amour' does wander. But 'Voice Poetry' is as funky as James Chance if not James Brown. And 'Home Grown' is as funky as Robert Johnson." The Globe and Mail noted that "a lot of things could be said about the band—it doesn't swing (rarely even rocks), it's cacophonous, strident and lacking in dynamics—but it also must be acknowledged that it's what Coleman wants."

Writing for Fact, Frank Schindelbeck stated: "While many regard Dancing to be the key Prime Time document, in my opinion it's Body Meta that first showed the full depth of Ornette's new band." He also considered the album "hugely important in that by setting up the Artists House label, Coleman showed that an artist of his stature and reputation could operate outside of the confines of major label hierarchy, ushering in a new era of independent and underground jazz distribution."

In a review for AllMusic, Michael G. Nastos wrote that the musicians on Body Meta are "loud, boisterous, imaginative, unfettered by conventional devices, and wail beyond compare with Coleman within relatively funky, straight beats."

== Track listing ==
All tracks composed by Ornette Coleman

=== Side A ===
1. "Voice Poetry" – 8:00
2. "Home Grown" – 7:36

=== Side B ===
1. "Macho Woman" – 7:35
2. "Fou Amor" – 8:01
3. "European Echoes" – 7:40

== Personnel ==
- Ornette Coleman – alto saxophone
- Charlie Ellerbee – guitar
- Ronald Shannon Jackson – drums
- Bern Nix – guitar
- Jamaaladeen Tacuma – bass guitar
- Elisabeth Atnafu – artwork
