= For the Love of Ornette =

Studio album by Jamaaladeen Tacuma
- Released: 2010
- Recorded: June 21, 2010
- Studios: MSR Studios, New York City
- Genres: Free jazz, free funk
- Length: 51:46
- Labels: Jam-All Productions; JAP-2; Jazzwerkstatt jw090
- Producer: Jamaaladeen Tacuma

Jamaaladeen Tacuma chronology
Coltrane Configurations (2009)	For the Love of Ornette (2010)	Revolutionary Royalty (2014)

Jazzwerkstatt cover

For the Love of Ornette is an album by electric bassist and composer Jamaaladeen Tacuma. It was recorded on June 21, 2010, at MSR Studios in New York City, and was released later that year by Tacuma's Jam-All Productions (United States), Jazzwerkstatt (Germany), and P-Vine (Japan). On the album, which is dedicated to Tacuma's mentor Ornette Coleman, the bassist is joined by Coleman himself on alto saxophone, Tony Kofi on tenor saxophone, Wolfgang Puschnig on flute, Yoichi Uzeki on piano, Justin Faulkner and David "Fingers" Haynes on drums, and Wadud Ahmad on vocals.

== Reception ==
Professional ratings
Review scores
Source	Rating
All About Jazz	4.5/5 stars
Audiophile Audition	3.5/5 stars
The Guardian	4/5 stars
Tom Hull – on the Web	B+

In a review for All About Jazz, Dan McClenaghan called the album "a celebration," and wrote: "This is almost too good to be true: an 'almost' Ornette Coleman album, blowing in out of the blue. Coleman isn't the leader on the set, but he's here, sounding as strong and true as ever."

The Guardian's John Fordham stated: "Despite the 80-year-old Ornette Coleman's advice to the other players here ('Fellers, can you hear me? Forget the note and get to the idea'), much of this sprawling but unique session is more conventionally song-based than the great saxophonist's harmolodic breakthroughs of five decades ago... It's a bit thrown together, but very heartwarming."

Ken Waxman of JazzWord described the album as an "unheralded but superior disc," and commented: "the unmistakable tart tone of Coleman's alto saxophone and rhythmically simple harmolodics themes endow this funk-tinged session with a welcome individuality... Tacuma may be leader here, but the most profound sounds throughout are made when Coleman asserts himself."

A reviewer for Audiophile Audition called the album "an invocation and a salutation; a tribute and an homage; and a continuation of the theory and form of Ornette Coleman's harmolodics." They remarked: "Through 51 minutes Tacuma and his carefully chosen ensemble... shift, push, careen and liberally convey notions of tension and release, communication and freedom."

== Track listing ==
1. "Journey" (Tacuma, Ahmad) – 1:25
2. "For the Love of Ornette" (Tacuma) – 7:18
3. "For the Love of Ornette - East Wind (Movement 1)" (Tacuma) – 6:38
4. "For the Love of Ornette - Drum & Space (Movement 2)" (Tacuma, Coleman) – 4:47
5. "Tacuma Song" (Coleman) – 8:28
6. "For the Love of Ornette - Fortworth Funky Stomp (Movement 3)" (Tacuma) – 5:28
7. "Tacuma Song - Celestial Conversations (Movement 1)" (Tacuma) – 7:54
8. "Tacuma Song - Vibe on This OC (Movement 2)" (Tacuma) – 3:44
9. "Tacuma Song - Celebration on Prince Street (Movement 3)" (Tacuma) – 5:57

== Personnel ==
- Jamaaladeen Tacuma – bass guitar
- Ornette Coleman – alto saxophone, wisdom
- Tony Kofi – tenor saxophone
- Wolfgang Puschnig – flute
- Yoichi Uzeki – piano
- Justin Faulkner – acoustic drums
- David "Fingers" Haynes – finger drums
- Wadud Ahmad – spoken word
