= Prime Time (band) =

Free funk band

- Genres: Jazz-funk; free funk; avant-funk; avant-garde jazz; free jazz
- Years active: 1975–1995, 2017
- Labels: Horizon Records; Artists House; Antilles Records; Portrait Records; Harmolodic/Verve Records
- Past members: Charles Ellerbee; Jamaaladeen Tacuma; Denardo Coleman; Kenny Wessel; Bern Nix; Ronald Shannon Jackson; Albert MacDowell; Sabir Kamal; Dave Bryant

Prime Time was an American free funk band formed by Ornette Coleman in 1975. The band utilized Coleman's theory of harmolodics to create their music. Founding members included guitarists Bern Nix and Charles Ellerbee, bassist Jamaaladeen Tacuma, and drummers Denardo Coleman and Ronald Shannon Jackson. Later members included bassist Albert MacDowell and drummer Sabir Kamal.

Ornette's first album with Prime Time was Dancing in Your Head, released in 1975. Their 1988 album Virgin Beauty, which featured guest appearances by Grateful Dead guitarist Jerry Garcia, was their most successful, peaking at number two on Billboard Jazz Albums chart and selling more in its first year than any previous Coleman record. Prime Time would later open for Grateful Dead at a 1993 concert at the Oakland Coliseum.

In 2017, two years after Ornette's death, Denardo reunited Prime Time for a concert at Alice Tully Hall in tribute to both Ornette and Bern Nix, who had died earlier that year.

== Discography ==
=== Studio albums ===
- Dancing in Your Head (1975)
- Body Meta (1978)
- Of Human Feelings (1979)
- In All Languages (1987)
- Virgin Beauty (1988)
- Tone Dialing (1995)

=== Live albums ===
- Opening the Caravan of Dreams (1985)
- Jazzbühne Berlin '88 (1988)
