= Tone Dialing =

Studio album by Ornette Coleman
- Released: September 26, 1995
- Recorded: 1995
- Genre: Jazz
- Length: 66:01
- Label: Harmolodic/Verve
- Producer: Denardo Coleman

Ornette Coleman chronology
Virgin Beauty (1988)	Tone Dialing (1995)	Colors: Live from Leipzig (1996)

Tone Dialing is an album recorded in 1995 by the American jazz composer and saxophonist Ornette Coleman and his Prime Time ensemble. It was released in September 1995 by Coleman's Harmolodic record label, in partnership with Verve/PolyGram. It was the Harmolodic label's first release, and "the first disc fully devoted to Coleman's music in eight years."

Regarding the album title, Coleman, in an interview, commented: "Information comes to people in the form of tone dialing. When you speak of something you speak in the tone of what it means to you. Sending a fax is tone dialing. When someone reads something you wrote, that's tone dialing... These songs were written so that the musicians would be able to express their views about the information they were using."

In a separate interview, Coleman stated: "When you hear the guitar, the bass, and everyone else play what is called their tone dialing sounds, they are not so much playing different notes as they are playing their own tones, a form of the notes they have been given in the clef that they read. Basically, what you are doing in harmolodics is relying on the basic information that goes into composing, playing, and improvising on forms... Your information may be limited, but the way you use the information doesn't have to be limited. Your tone will cause you to change any note to the way you hear it. Your relationship to your tone is based on your emotions. If it wasn't, everybody would sound the same. When you play something and you hear you own tone, that's tone dialing. That's you. If you create music just from the concept of your own tone, you will be doing something no one else has discovered."

== Reception ==
Professional ratings
Review scores
Source	Rating
AllMusic	4/5 stars
Christgau's Consumer Guide	A−
Tom Hull	B+
Rolling Stone	4/5 stars

The AllMusic review by Scott Yanow awarded the album 4 stars, stating, "despite the inclusion of one obnoxious rap, this free funk set is well worth picking up by open-minded listeners".

In a review for Rolling Stone, David Fricke stated: "Tone Dialing... is a record of high spirits and lively, colliding ideas, like the raucous cross talk of a Mississippi roadhouse combo and the breathless locomotion of an African high-life orchestra. For all of the old free-jazz notions attached to Coleman's music since the late '50s, he and Prime Time now cook with a force akin to that of George Clinton and P-Funk's: jamming in tongues with unity of spirit... despite almost 40 years of rejection and misunderstanding of his music, even by old fans who consider the Prime Time concept a sellout to electric pop, Coleman is still... dancing in his head. There's plenty of room for the rest of us."

Writing for Jelly, Glenn Brooks commented: "Tone Dialing... is just plain fun... if you have any interest in Ornette's music, this album is a great place to start... it is complex, challenging and sometimes chaotic. But it is also – more so – just fresh fun funky jazz."

== Track listing ==
All compositions by Ornette Coleman except as indicated

1. "Street Blues" – 4:58
2. "Search for Life" – 7:32
3. "Guadalupe" – 4:10
4. "Bach Prelude" (Johann Sebastian Bach) – 5:40
5. "Sound Is Everywhere" – 3:34
6. "Miguel's Fortune" – 6:04
7. "La Capella" – 4:32
8. "O.A.C." – 2:47
9. "If I Knew as Much About You (As You Know About Me)" – 2:36
10. "When Will I See You Again" – 2:46
11. "Kathelin Gray" (Coleman, Pat Metheny) – 4:41
12. "Badal" – 4:42
13. "Tone Dialing" – 1:45
14. "Family Reunion" – 4:07
15. "Local Instinct" – 2:56
16. "Ying Yang" – 2:56

== Personnel ==
- Ornette Coleman – alto saxophone, trumpet, violin
- Dave Bryant – keyboards
- Chris Rosenberg, Ken Wessel – guitar
- Bradley Jones, Al MacDowell – bass
- Chris Walker – bass, keyboards
- Denardo Coleman – drums
- Badal Roy – tabla, percussion
- Avenda Khadija, Moishe Nalm – vocals
