= Colors: Live from Leipzig =

Live album by Ornette Coleman and Joachim Kühn
- Released: January 13, 1997
- Recorded: August 31, 1996
- Genre: Jazz
- Length: 65:38
- Label: Harmolodic/Verve
- Producer: Denardo Coleman

Ornette Coleman chronology
Tone Dialing (1995)	Colors: Live from Leipzig (1997)	Sound Museum: Hidden Man (1996)

Colors: Live from Leipzig is a live album by the American jazz composer and saxophonist Ornette Coleman and German pianist Joachim Kühn recorded in 1996 and released on the Harmolodic/Verve label.

== Reception ==
Professional ratings
Review scores
Source	Rating
AllMusic	4/5 stars
The Penguin Guide to Jazz Recordings	4/4 stars

The AllMusic review by Richard S. Ginell awarded the album 4 stars, stating, "Colors is a fascinating addition to the Ornette Coleman catalogue".

The authors of The Penguin Guide to Jazz wrote: "On the face of it an unlikely combination, but one which yielded Ornette's most evocative album of recent years... The performances are extraordinary... All the pieces... were written specifically for the date... A wholly unexpected meeting of minds, and one of the happiest dates Ornette has put on record in years."

Robert Christgau awarded the album an "A−", and commented: "Having divided his career between better-than-average fusion records that still weren't anything to write reviews about and explorations of his moderately prodigious classical chops, Kühn proves a serviceable helpmeet to genius. On this live-in-Leipzig duet album his pianistics comprise an exotically European environment for Ornette's transcultural sound and melody--a bracing change and a damn fine handle whether crashingly atonal or liltingly romantic."

Writing for Rock Salted, Syd Fablo stated: "It is Kühn's classical training and seeming affinity for the Second Viennese School's chromatic expressionism that makes him a rather perfect pairing with Ornette. The two players are able to meander endlessly, usually independently, but also with Kühn reacting to Coleman. There is plenty of space in these performances for reflection... Ornette still plays in his trademark way, with practically no vibrato and with lines that tend to sustain the high notes. There is little of the R&B influence of Ornette's early recordings. No matter. These performances are wonderful."

== Track listing ==
All compositions by Ornette Coleman

- "Faxing" - 5:43
- "House of Stained Glass" - 7:08
- "Refills" - 9:02
- "Story Writing" - 10:21
- "Three Ways to One" - 8:54
- "Passion Cultures" - 8:41
- "Night Plans" - 10:01
- "Cyber Cyber" - 5:48

Recorded at the 20th Anniversary Leipziger JazzTage at the Leipzig Opera on August 31, 1996

== Personnel ==
- Ornette Coleman - alto saxophone, trumpet, violin
- Joachim Kühn - piano
