= Jamaaladeen Tacuma =

American free jazz bassist (born 1956)

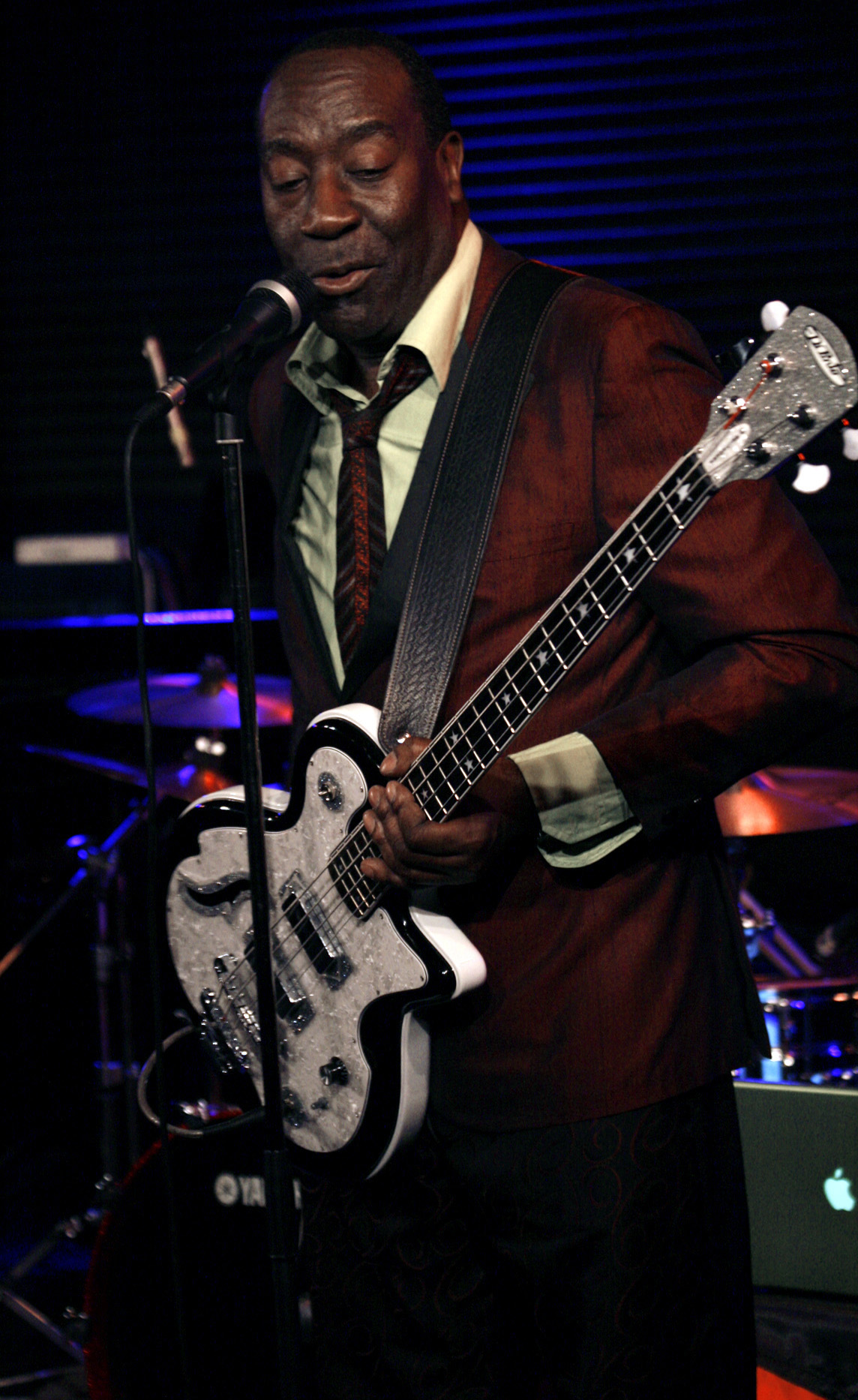
- Tacuma in Vienna, 2008

Background information
- Born: Rudy McDaniel; June 11, 1956 (age 69); Hempstead, New York, U.S.
- Genres: Jazz, free jazz, free funk, jazz fusion
- Instrument: Electric bass
- Years active: 1975–present
- Labels: Gramavision, Thirsty Ear, P-Vine, DIW, Moers Music, Timeless
- Website: www.jamaaladeenmusic.com

Jamaaladeen Tacuma (born Rudy McDaniel; June 11, 1956) is an American jazz funk avant-garde bassist, composer and producer born in Hempstead, New York. He was a bandleader on the Gramavision label and worked with Ornette Coleman during the 1970s and 1980s, mostly in Coleman's Prime Time band.

Tacuma showcased a unique style of avant-garde jazz on Coleman's 1982 album Of Human Feelings, and became widely viewed as one of the most distinctive bassists since Jaco Pastorius. Tacuma formed his own group, and recorded albums that incorporated commercially accessible melodies while retaining Prime Time's elaborate harmonies.

== Biography ==
Tacuma, raised in Philadelphia, Pennsylvania, showed interest in music at a young age, performing with the organist Charles Earland in his teens. Through Earland, Tacuma came to know the record producer Reggie Lucas, who introduced Jamaaladeen to Ornette Coleman in 1975 at age 19. As the electric bassist for Coleman's funky harmolodic Prime Time group, Tacuma rose to prominence quickly; guitarist Bern Nix was another band member. While with Prime Time, Tacuma relied mostly on traditional technique, picking with his fingers. His later work revealed a master improviser and showcased a more rhythmic, thumb-slapping funk approach.

The first three Prime Time recordings (Dancing in Your Head, Body Meta, and Of Human Feelings, all recorded in the late 1970s) feature Tacuma's work on a Rickenbacker bass, a model popular among progressive rock musicians, but rarely used on jazz recordings. He switched to a Steinberger bass in the 1980s, an instrument that helped him create his readily identifiable sound.

Tacuma's work with Prime Time landed him his most high-profile gig to date: an appearance with the band on Saturday Night Live on April 14, 1979, which Tacuma later cited in Musician magazine as his "best live performance ever". Besides the work with such musicians as James "Blood" Ulmer, Walt Dickerson, Chuck Hammer, and David Murray, he collaborated with the upcoming artists of the New York Downtown scene like Kip Hanrahan, David Moss, Bill Laswell and Anton Fier (The Golden Palominos, 1983) that further heightened his reputation. Tacuma's first solo album, Show Stopper, came in 1983 on the Gramavision label; the album grew out of the jazz-funk style he developed in his work with Coleman. His other works as leader at Gramavision followed that formula.

In the 1980s, he started to perform in a relatively straightforward funk/R&B setting with his group Cosmetic. He was frequently featured in music magazines thanks to his aggressive, driving playing style and his angular fashion sense. In 1981, Tacuma received the highest number of votes ever for an electric bassist in the "talent deserving wider recognition" category of the DownBeat magazine critics poll.

Since the early 1990s, he has remained active but has maintained a lower profile. He has made numerous solo and collaborative recordings, including several CDs of duets with saxophonist Wolfgang Puschnig. AllMusic cited Mirakle, a recording that features Tacuma, drummer Grant Calvin Weston, and guitarist Derek Bailey as one of the "most important recordings of year 2000." In 2006, he returned to the jazz spotlight with an appearance on the World Saxophone Quartet's Political Blues.

In 2007, he joined with Weston and guitarist Vernon Reid (known for his work in Living Colour and with Ronald Shannon Jackson) to form the power trio Free Form Funky Freqs. He has also recorded two albums with Basso Nouveau, a group that features multiple bassists playing together on a variety of instruments, including electric bass, upright bass and acoustic bass guitar, and that also includes bassist Gerald Veasley.

Tacuma has received the following awards and fellowships: "Parallel Culture" Award 2009, Marcus Garvey Foundation 50th Anniversary Award 2011, The Pew Fellowship in the Arts 2011 and The Uptown Theater Hall of Fame Award in 2014, Gerald Veasely's Bass Boot Camp "Living The Dream Award - 2016, The Philadelphia Clef Club of Jazz Best Bassist 2017. He has received The MacDowell Colony 2011, Headlands Center for the Arts 2012 and Civitella Ranieri 2014 residency fellowship. In 2017, he received The Philadelphia Club Club of Jazz Best Bassist Award, in 2018 he received the City of Philadelphia's Benny Golson Award, The Benny Golson Award includes a City proclamation and the Liberty Bell award – one of the highest honors from the City of Philadelphia. Since 2015, Tacuma presents the annual Outsiders Improvised & Creative Music Festival in Philadelphia and continues to tour, produce and record worldwide.

== Discography ==
=== As leader ===
- Show Stopper (Gramavision, 1983)
- Renaissance Man (Gramavision, 1984)
- Music World (Gramavision, 1986)
- Jukebox (Gramavision, 1988)
- Boss of the Bass (Gramavision, 1991)
- Sound Symphony (1992)
- with Basso Nouveau: The Night of Chamber Music (Moers Music, 1993)
- Dreamscape (DIW, 1996)
- Groove 2000 (P-Vine, 1998)
- Brotherzone (P-Vine, 1999)
- Flavors of Thelonious Monk Reloaded (Extraplatte/Jam All Productions 2008)
- Rendezvous Suite (Jazzwerkstatt, 2011)
- For the Love of Ornette (Jam All Productions /P-Vine, 2010)
- Legends of The Pipe & Sweater (Jam All Productions, 2015)
- Electric Electrico (Jam All Productions 2016)
- Gnawa Soul Experience (Jam All Productions, 2017)

==== with Cosmetic ====
- Cosmetics / New Complexion (12", Rough Trade, 1981)
- Get Ready (/ Put It On) (12", Gramavision, 1982)
- (In the) Nightlife (/ (In the) Nightlife (Instrumental)) (12", Gramavision, 1983)
- So Tranquilizin' (Gramavision, 1985)
- So Tranquilizin' (Dance Mix) (/ N-Er-Gize-Me) (12", Gramavision, 1985)

=== As co-leader ===
- and Dennis Alston: Sound Symphony (Moers Music, 1992)
- and Cornell Rochester: Meet the Podium 3: Live in Köln (Timeless, 1994)
- Doran – Studer – Tacuma (with Christy Doran and Freddy Studer): Race the Time (Migros, 1997)
- with Burhan Öçal featuring Natacha Atlas: Groove alla turca (Doublemoon, 1999)
- with Derek Bailey and Calvin Weston: Mirakle (Tzadik, 2000)
- with Uwe Kropinski: Zwei (Jazzwerkstatt, 2009)
- The Meeting Trio- Bobby Zankel and Webb Thomas (Jam All Productions, 2016)

==== with Free Form Funky Frēqs (trio with Vernon Reid and Calvin Weston) ====
- Urban Mythology Volume One (Thirsty Ear, 2007)
- Bon Vivant (Jam All Productions, 2013)
- Hymn of the 3rd Galaxy (Ropeadope, 2022)

=== As sideman ===
==== with Ornette Coleman ====
- Body Meta (Artists House, 1976)
- Dancing in Your Head (A&M/Horizon Records, 1977)
- Of Human Feelings (Antilles, 1982)
- Opening the Caravan of Dreams (Caravan of Dreams, 1985)
- In All Languages (Caravan of Dreams, 1987)

==== with Wolfgang Puschnig ====
- Pieces of the Dream (Amadeo, 1988)
- Gemini-Gemini – The Flavors of Thelonious Monk (ITM, 1991)
- Alpine Aspects (Amadeo, 1991)
- Mixed Metaphors w/ Ernst Jandl (Amadeo, 1995)
- Journey Into the Gemini Territory (ITM Pacific, 1996)
- Roots & Fruits (Amadeo, 1998)

==== with Sean Noonan ====
- Boxing Dreams (Songlines, 2008)
- There's Always the Night (noonansmusic, 2014)
- Tan Man's Hat (Rarenoise, 2019)

==== with Red Sun and Samul Nori ====
- Red Sun/Samul Nori (Amadeo, 1989)
- Then Comes the White Tiger (ECM, 1994)
- Nanjang – A New Horizon (Amadeo, 1995)

==== with Linda Sharrock ====
- Linda Sharrock & The Three Man Band (Moers Music, 1991)

=== with others ===
with James Carter

- Layin' the Cut (Atlantic, 2000)

with Walt Dickerson

- Walt Dickerson 1976 (Whynot, 1976)
- Serendipity (SteepleChase, 1977)

with James Blood Ulmer

- Tales of Captain Black (Artists House, 1978)
- Music Revelation Ensemble (DIW, 1988)

with Kip Hanrahan

- Coup de tête (American Clavé, 1981)
- Desire Develops an Edge (American Clavé, 1983)
- Conjure: Music for the Texts of Ishmael Reed (American Clavé, 1985)

with Nona Hendryx

- Nona (RCA, 1982)

with The Golden Palominos

- The Golden Palominos (Celluloid, 1983)

with David Moss

- Full House (Moers Music, 1984)

with Jayne Cortez and the Firespitters

- There It Is (Bola Press, 1982)

with Cashmere

- Let the Music Turn You On (Philly World, 1983)

with Veronica Underwood

- Veronica Underwood (Philly World, 1985)

with Khan Jamal

- Thinking of You (Storyville, 1987)

with Grant Calvin Weston

- Dance Romance (In+Out, 1988)

with Fool Proof

- No Friction (Gramavision, 1988)

with James Watkins

- Intense (ITM, 1989)

with Courtney Pine

- The Vision's Tale (Antilles, 1989)

with Pink Inc.

- Alex Deutsch 's Pink Inc. (DIW, 1991)
- Keys 2 the Kastle (Sweeca, 1995)

with Bazillus

- The Regulator featuring Eddie Harris (Act/Zero, 1992)

with Fredy Studer and Christy Doran

- Half a Lifetime (Unit, 1994)

with Sylk 130

- When the Funk Hits the Fan (Ovum, 1997)

with Ben Schachter

- Fractals (Ben-Jam, 1999)

with Peter Murphy

- Dust (Metropolis, 2002)

with Marc Ribot

- The Young Philadelphians: Live in Tokyo (Yellowbird, 2015)
