= Opening the Caravan of Dreams =

Live album by Ornette Coleman
- Released: 1985
- Recorded: 1985
- Venue: Caravan of Dreams in Fort Worth
- Genre: Jazz, harmolodic funk
- Length: 36:21
- Label: Caravan Of Dreams Productions

Ornette Coleman chronology
Of Human Feelings (1982)	Opening the Caravan of Dreams (1985)	Prime Design/Time Design (1985)

Opening the Caravan of Dreams is a 1985 live album by jazz saxophonist Ornette Coleman and his Prime Time ensemble. It was recorded at a concert inaugurating the Caravan of Dreams, a then-newly opened performing arts center in Coleman's hometown of Fort Worth, Texas.

== Critical reception ==
Professional ratings
Review scores
Source	Rating
AllMusic	4/5 stars
The Village Voice	A−

In a contemporary review for The Village Voice, Robert Christgau said Opening the Caravan of Dreams "lacks the studio-engendered beginning-middle-end that focuses Of Human Feelings and for that matter Metheny/Coleman's Song X. When it threatens to break altogether 'free,' its risks seem more like entropy than thrills and chills. But it's a live album showcasing one of the great improvisers, as well as musicians who never sound more authoritative than when following his orders." Robert Palmer wrote in The New York Times, "The event lent the music a certain raw edge and a bluesy vitality. But it also attains an impressive clarity; in many ways, it's a more openly accessible piece of work than the thick, thundering group improvisations heard on the Coleman-Pat Metheny Song X album." Scott Yanow later wrote in a review published by AllMusic, "this was the leading 'free funk' band of the 1980s, and this LP, which is worth a search by open-eared listeners, gives one a definitive look into the group's unusual music".

== Track listing ==
=== Side one ===
1. "To Know What To Know" – 8:03
2. "Harmolodic-Bebop" – 6:17
3. "Sex Spy" – 5:43

=== Side two ===
1. "City Living" – 6:15
2. "Seethru" – 4:35
3. "Compute" – 9:01

== Personnel ==
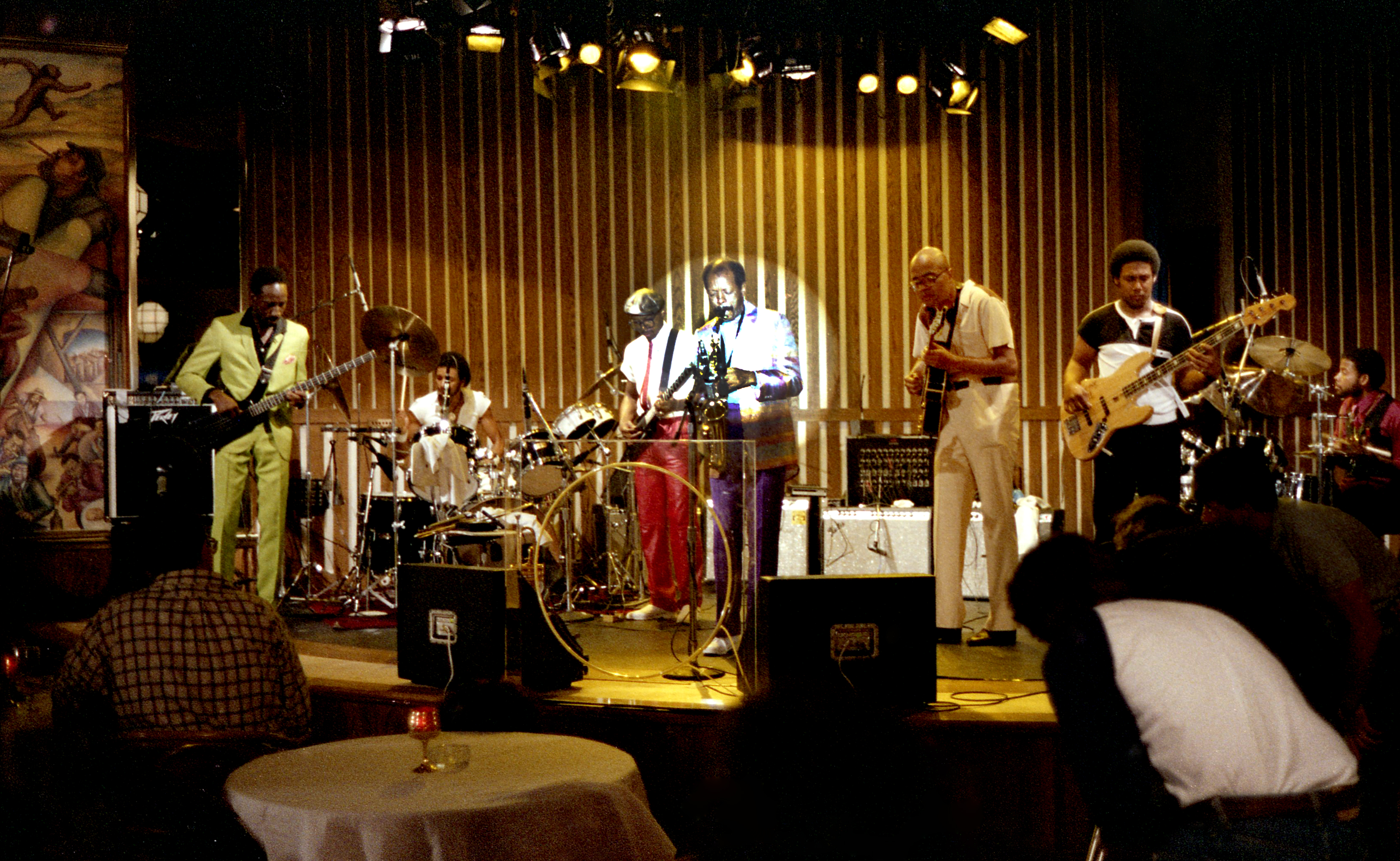
Ornette Coleman and Prime Time at the Caravan of Dreams in 1985

- Denardo Coleman – Drums
- Ornette Coleman – Alto Saxophone, Trumpet, Violin
- Charlie Ellerbie – Guitar
- Sabir Kamal – Drums
- Albert MacDowell – Bass
- Bern Nix – Guitar
- Jamaaladeen Tacuma – Bass
