= Of Human Feelings =

1979 Ornette Coleman album

Studio album by Ornette Coleman
- Released: 1982
- Recorded: April 25, 1979
- Studio: CBS (New York)
- Genre: Harmolodic funk; jazz-funk; free jazz; jazz fusion
- Length: 36:21
- Label: Antilles
- Producer: Ornette Coleman

Ornette Coleman chronology
Body Meta (1978)	Of Human Feelings (1982)	Opening the Caravan of Dreams (1985)

Of Human Feelings is an album by American jazz saxophonist, composer, and bandleader Ornette Coleman. It was recorded on April 25, 1979, at CBS Studios in New York City with his band Prime Time, which featured guitarists Charlie Ellerbee and Bern Nix, bassist Jamaaladeen Tacuma, and drummers Calvin Weston and Coleman's son Denardo. It followed the saxophonist's failed attempt to record a direct-to-disc session earlier in March of the same year and was the first jazz album to be recorded digitally in the United States.

The album's jazz-funk music continued Coleman's harmolodic approach to improvisation with Prime Time, whom he had introduced on his 1975 album Dancing in Your Head. This approach emphasized natural rhythmic and emotional responses in a way that Coleman compared to a spirit of collective consciousness. He also drew on rhythm and blues influences from early in his career for Of Human Feelings, which had shorter and more distinct compositions than Dancing in Your Head, while applying free jazz principles from his music during the 1960s to elements of funk.

Following a change in his management, Coleman signed with Island Records, and Of Human Feelings was released in 1982 by its subsidiary label Antilles Records. Critics generally praised the album's expressive music and harmolodic approach, but it made little commercial impact and went out of print. Coleman enlisted his son Denardo as manager after a dispute with his former managers over the album's royalties, a change that inspired him to perform publicly again during the 1980s.

== Background ==
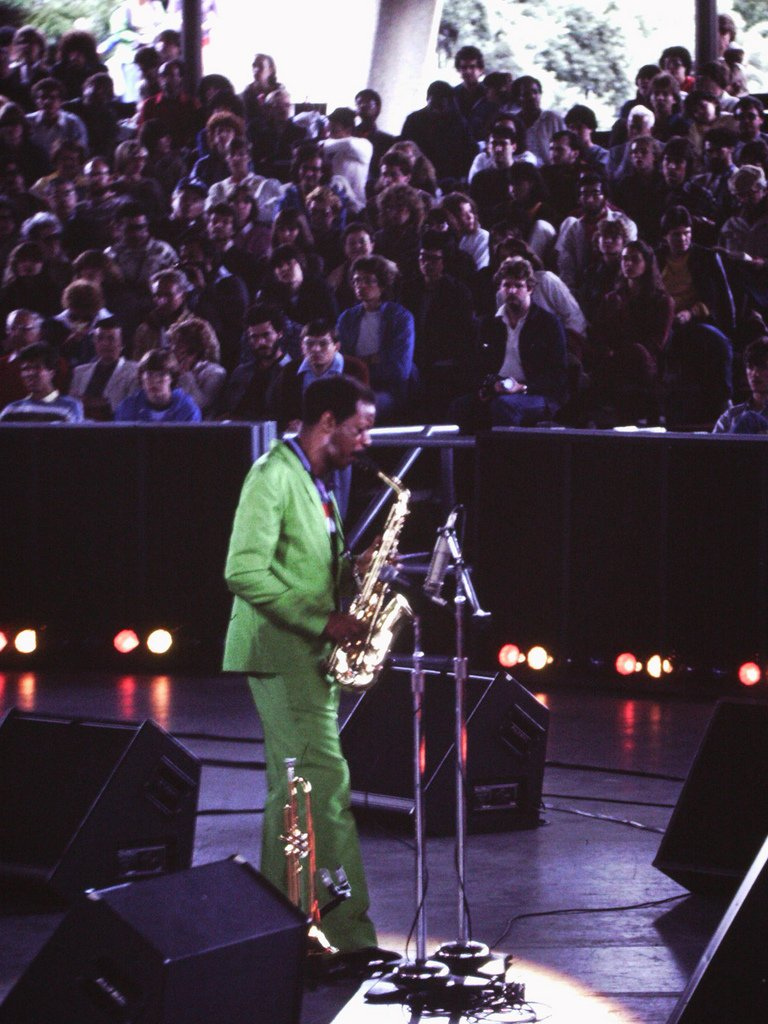
Coleman in 1982

At the end of the 1960s, Ornette Coleman became one of the most influential musicians in jazz after pioneering the controversial free jazz subgenre, which contemporary jazz critics and musicians derided for its deviation from conventional structures of harmony and tonality. By the mid-1970s, however, he had stopped recording free jazz, instead pursuing a new creative theory he called harmolodics and recruiting electric instrumentalists in the process.

According to Coleman's theory of harmolodics, all the musicians in an ensemble are able to play individual melodies in any key, and still sound coherent as a collective unit. He taught his young sidemen this new improvisational and ensemble approach, based on their individual tendencies, and discouraged them from being influenced by conventional styles. Coleman likened this group ethic to a spirit of "collective consciousness" that stresses "human feelings" and "biological rhythms", and said that he wanted the music, rather than himself, to be successful. He also started to incorporate elements from other styles into his music, including rock influences such as the electric guitar and non-Western rhythms played by Moroccan and Nigerian musicians.

Of Human Feelings is a continuation of the harmolodics approach Coleman had applied with Prime Time, an electric quartet introduced on his 1975 album Dancing in Your Head. The group comprised guitarists Charlie Ellerbee and Bern Nix, bassist Jamaaladeen Tacuma, and drummers Ronald Shannon Jackson and Denardo Coleman, Ornette Coleman's son. Tacuma was still in high school when Coleman enlisted him, and first recorded with Prime Time in 1975 for the album Body Meta, which was released in 1978. Tacuma had played in an ensemble for jazz organist Charles Earland, but Earland dismissed him as he felt audiences gave excessive attention to his playing. Coleman found Tacuma's playing ideal for harmolodics and encouraged him not to change. Although Coleman's theory initially challenged his knowledge and perception of music, Tacuma came to like the unconventional role each band member was given as a soloist and melodist: "When we read Ornette's music we have his notes, but we listen for his phrases and phrase the way he wants to. I can take the same melody, then, and phrase it like I want to, and those notes will determine the phrasing, the rhythm, the harmony – all of that."

== Recording and production ==
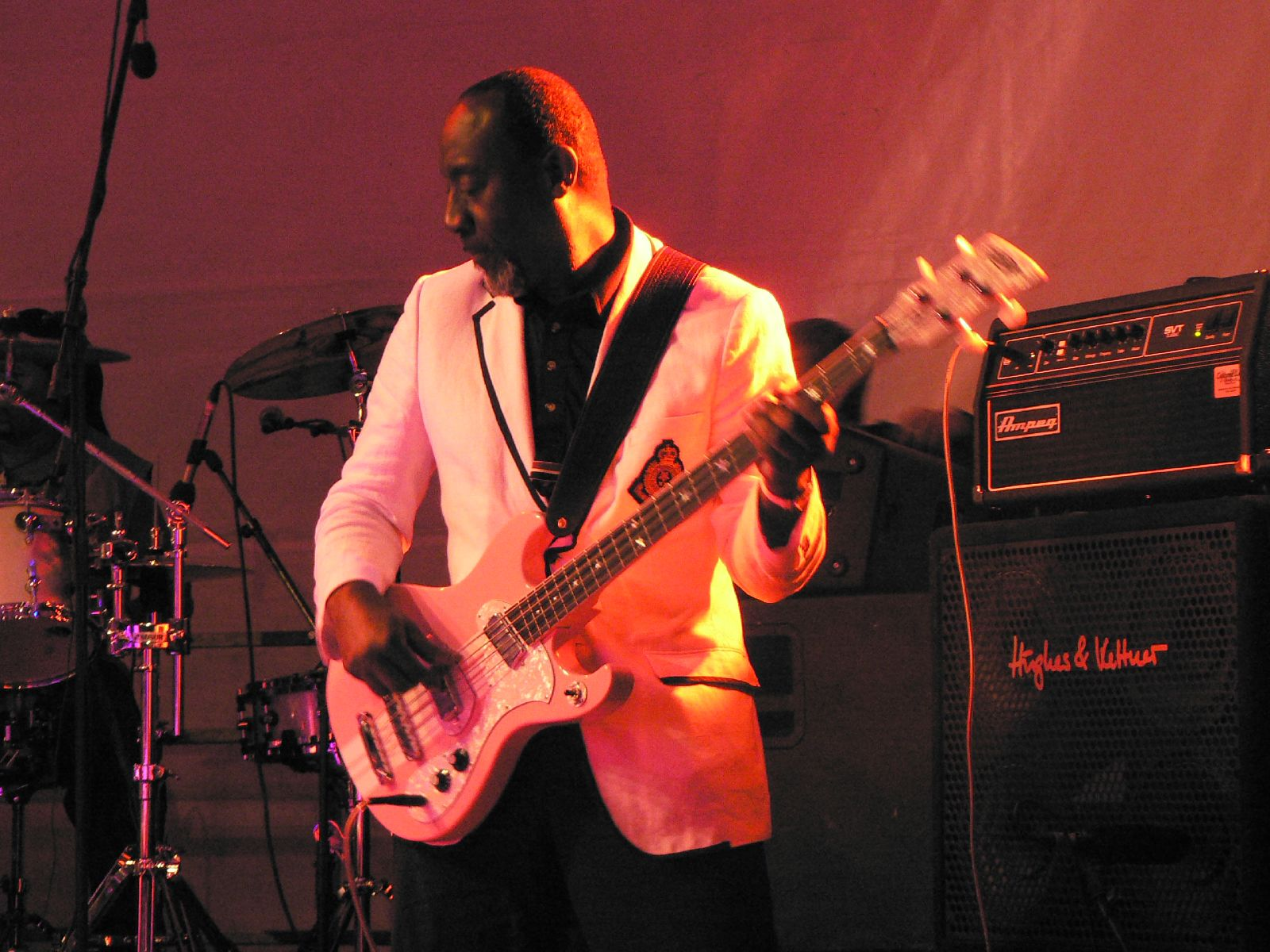
Jamaaladeen Tacuma in 2007

In March 1979, Coleman went to RCA Records' New York studio to produce an album with Prime Time by direct-to-disc recording. They had mechanical problems with the studio equipment, and the recording was rejected. The failed session was a project under Phrase Text, Coleman's music publishing company. He wanted to set up his own record company with the same name, and chose his old friend Kunle Mwanga as his manager.

The next month, Mwanga arranged another session for Coleman, this time at CBS Studios in New York City. Recorded under the title Fashion Faces, this April 25, 1979, session resulted in Of Human Feelings. Jackson did not record with the band; instead, Calvin Weston was hired in his place to play simultaneously with Denardo Coleman. They recorded all the album's songs on the first take without any equipment problems.

The album's recording session was captured using a Sony PCM-1600 two-track digital recorder, a rare item at the time. According to journalist Howard Mandel, the passages played by the band sounded neither very soft or loud on the album, because it had been mixed with a middle-frequency range and compressed dynamics. Because of the equipment used, Coleman did not embellish the album with added effects and avoided overdubbing, multi-tracking, and remixing. According to him, Of Human Feelings was the first jazz album to be digitally recorded in the United States.

== Composition and performance ==
People have started asking me if I'm really a rhythm-'n'-blues player, and I always say, why, sure. To me rhythm is the oxygen that sits under the notes and moves them along and blues is the colouring of those notes, how they're interpreted in an emotional way.

— Ornette Coleman (1981)

According to The Concise Oxford Dictionary of Music (2004), Of Human Feelings features jazz-funk, a type of music that developed at the turn of the 1970s and was characterized by intricate rhythmic patterns, a recurrent bass line, and Latin rhythmic elements. Lloyd Sachs of the Chicago Sun-Times wrote that, although Coleman was not viewed as a jazz fusion artist, the album can be described as such because of its combination of free jazz and funk. Glenn Kenny disagreed and felt its boisterous style had more in common with the no wave genre and the artists of New York City's downtown music scene such as John Zorn. Jazz writer Stuart Nicholson viewed it as the culmination of Coleman's musical principles that dated back to his free jazz music in 1960, but reappropriated with a funk-oriented backbeat. According to jazz critic Barry McRae, "it was as if Coleman was translating the concept of the famous double quartet" from his 1961 album Free Jazz to what was required to perform jazz-funk.

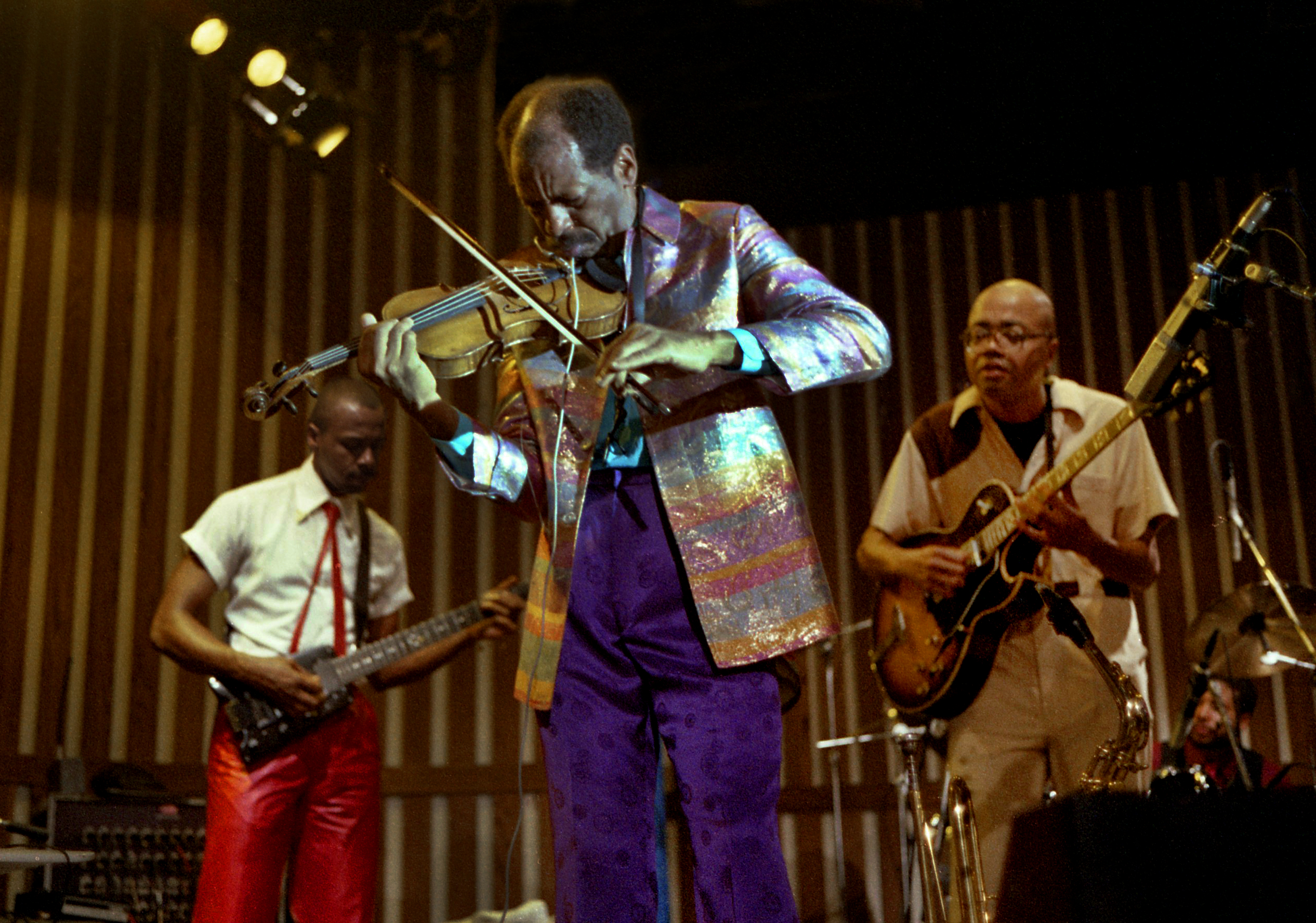
Coleman (middle), accompanied by guitarists Charlie Ellerbee (left) and Bern Nix (right)

Coleman incorporated traditional structures and rhythms, and other elements from the rhythm and blues music he had played early his career. According to Mandel, the album's simple, brisk music was more comparable to a coherent R&B band than jazz fusion. Although Coleman still performed the melodies on a song, he employed two guitarists for contrast to make each pair of guitarist and drummer responsible for either the rhythm or melody. Ellerbee provided accented linear counterpoint and Nix played variations of the song's melody, while Denardo Coleman and Weston played both polyrhythms and backbeats. On songs such as "Jump Street" and "Love Words", Ellerbee incorporated distortion into his guitar playing, which gave the songs a thicker texture. Tacuma and Ornette Coleman's instrumental responses were played as the foreground to the less prominent guitars. McRae remarked that Coleman and Prime Time exchanged "directional hints" throughout the songs, as one player changed key and the others modulated accordingly. The band made no attempt to harmonize their radically different parts while playing.

"Sleep Talk"
A 21-second sample of "Sleep Talk", which exemplifies Prime Time's sound and musical aesthetic

Of Human Feelings features shorter and more distinct compositions than Dancing in Your Head. "Sleep Talk", "Air Ship", and "Times Square" were originally performed by Coleman during his concerts in 1978 under the names "Dream Talking", "Meta", and "Writing in the Streets", respectively. "What Is the Name of That Song?" was titled as a sly reference to two of his older compositions, "Love Eyes" and "Forgotten Songs" (also known as "Holiday for Heroes"), whose themes were played concurrently and transfigured by Prime Time. The theme from "Forgotten Songs", originally from Coleman's 1972 album Skies of America, was used as a refrain. "Jump Street" is a blues piece, "Air Ship" comprises a six-bar riff, and the atonal "Times Square" has futuristic dance themes. "Love Words" heavily uses polymodality, a central feature of harmolodics, and juxtaposes Coleman's extended solo against a dense, rhythmically complex backdrop. Nicholson observed West African rhythms and collective improvisation rooted in New Orleans jazz on "Love Words", and suggested that "Sleep Talk" was derived from the opening bassoon solo in Igor Stravinsky's 1913 orchestral work The Rite of Spring. The latter track is led off by Tacuma's bass playing and, according to Premier Guitar journalist Nick Millevoi, is an ideal example of Prime Time's aesthetic and sound.

== Marketing and sales ==
A few weeks after Of Human Feelings was recorded, Mwanga went to Japan to negotiate a deal with Trio Records to have the album released on Phrase Text. Trio, who had previously released a compilation of Coleman's 1966 to 1971 live performances in Paris, prepared to press the album once Mwanga provided the label with the record stamper. Coleman was also set to perform his song "Skies of America" with the NHK Symphony Orchestra, but cancelled both deals upon Mwanga's return from Japan. Mwanga immediately quit after less than four months as Coleman's manager.

In 1981, Coleman hired Stan and Sid Bernstein as his managers, who sold the album's recording tapes to Island Records. He signed with the record label that year, and Of Human Feelings was released in 1982 on Island's subsidiary jazz label Antilles Records. Billboard magazine published a front-page story at the time about its distinction as both the first digital album recorded in New York City and the first digital jazz album recorded by an American label.

According to jazz writer Francis Davis, "a modest commercial breakthrough seemed imminent" for Coleman, who appeared to be regaining his celebrity. German musicologist Peter Niklas Wilson said the album may have been the most tuneful and commercial-sounding of his career at that point. The album's clean mix and relatively short tracks were interpreted as an attempt for radio airplay by Mandel, who described its production as "the surface consistency that would put it in the pop sphere".

Of Human Feelings had no success on the American pop charts, however, only charting on the Top Jazz Albums, where it spent 26 weeks and peaked at number 15. Because the record offered a middle ground between funk and jazz, McRae argued that it consequently appealed to neither demographic of listeners. Sound & Vision critic Brent Butterworth speculated that it was overlooked because it had electric instruments, rock and funk drumming, and did not conform to what he felt was the hokey image of jazz that many of the genre's fans preferred. The album later went out of print.

== Critical reception ==
Professional ratings
Review scores
Source	Rating
AllMusic	4/5 stars
Rolling Stone	4/5 stars
The Rolling Stone Jazz Record Guide	4/5 stars
Spin Alternative Record Guide	10/10
Tom Hull – on the Web	A
The Village Voice	A+

Of Human Feelings received considerable acclaim from contemporary critics. Reviewing the album for Esquire in 1982, Gary Giddins hailed it as another landmark recording from Coleman and his most accomplished work of harmolodics, partly because of compositions which he found clearly expressed and occasionally timeless. In his opinion, the discordant keys radically transmute conventional polyphony and may be the most challenging part for listeners, who he said should concentrate on Coleman's playing and "let the maelstrom resolve itself around his center". Giddins also highlighted the melody of "Sleep Talk", deeming it among the best of the saxophonist's career. Kofi Natambu from the Detroit Metro Times wrote that Coleman's synergetic approach displays expressive immediacy rather than superficial technical flair while calling the record "a multi-tonal mosaic of great power, humor, color, wit, sensuality, compassion and tenderness". He found the songs inspirational, danceable, and encompassing developments in African-American music over the previous century. Robert Christgau called its "warm, listenable harmolodic funk" an artistic "breakthrough if not a miracle". He found its exchange of rhythms and simple melodies heartfelt and sophisticated, writing in The Village Voice that "the way the players break into ripples of song only to ebb back into the tideway is participatory democracy at its most practical and utopian."

Purist critics in jazz complained about the music's incorporation of danceable beats and electric guitar. In Stereo Review, Chris Albertson deemed the combination of saxophone and bizarre funk occasionally captivating but ultimately unfocused. Dan Sullivan of the Los Angeles Times believed the album's supporters in "hip rock circles" had overlooked flaws, arguing that Tacuma and Coleman's playing sound like a unique "beacon of clarity" amid an incessant background. Leonard Feather wrote in the Toledo Blade that the music is stylistically ambiguous, potentially controversial, and difficult to assess but interesting enough to warrant a listen.

At the end of 1982, Of Human Feelings the year's best album by Billboard editor Peter Keepnews, who viewed it as a prime example of fusing free jazz with modern funk. In year-end lists for The Boston Phoenix, James Hunter and Howard Hampton ranked the album number one and number four, respectively. It was voted 13th best in the Pazz & Jop, an annual poll of American critics nationwide, published in The Village Voice. Christgau, the poll's supervisor, ranked it number one in an accompanying list, and in 1990 he named it the second-best album of the 1980s.

== Aftermath and legacy ==
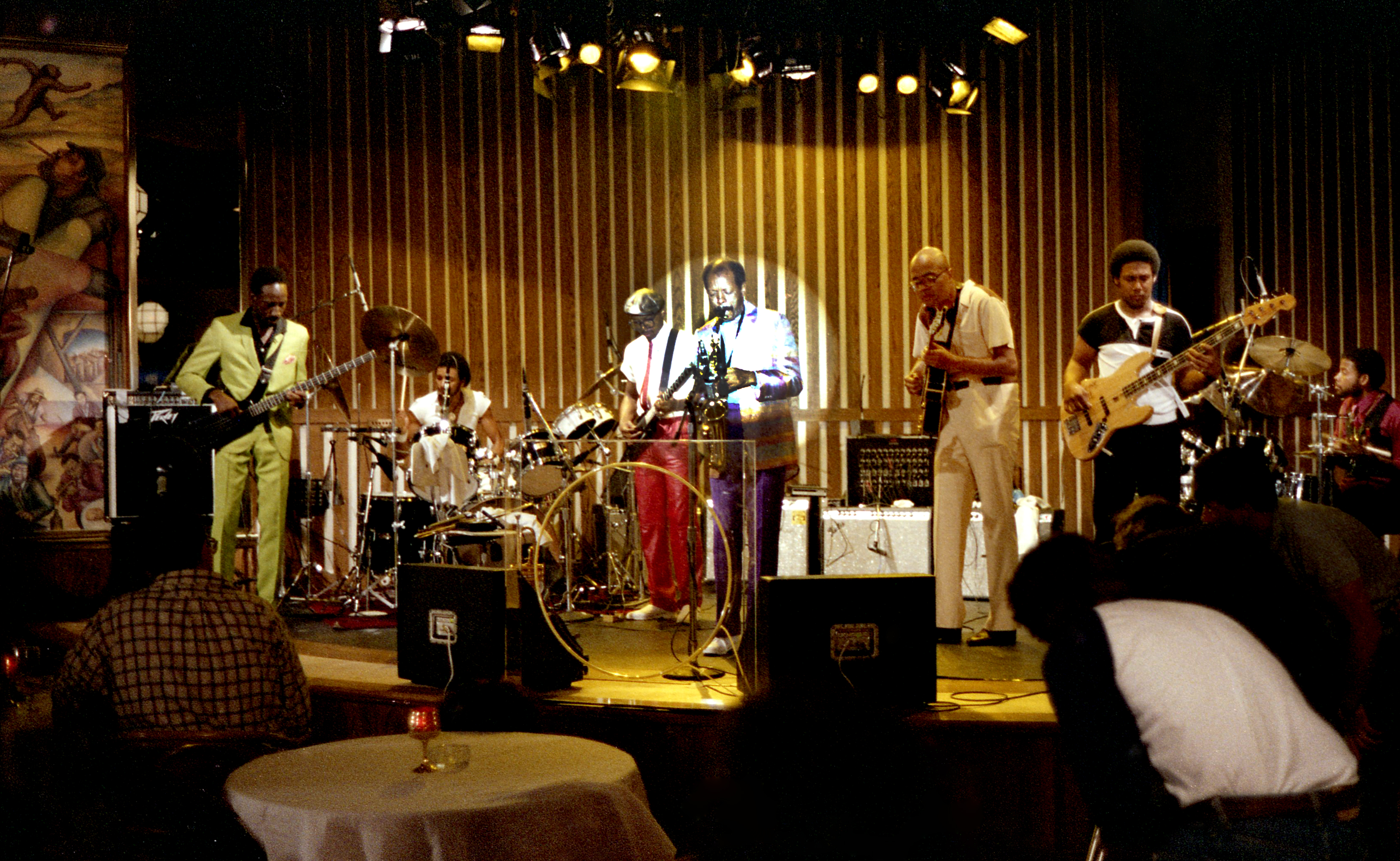
Coleman and Prime Time at the Caravan of Dreams in 1985

Coleman received $25,000 for the publishing rights to Of Human Feelings but said his managers sold it for less than the recording costs and that he did not receive any of its royalties. According to Stan Bernstein, Coleman had financial expectations that were "unrealistic in this business unless you're Michael Jackson". Antilles label executive Ron Goldstein felt the $25,000 Coleman received was neither a great nor a fair amount for someone in jazz. After he had gone over budget to record a follow-up album, Island did not release it nor pick up their option on him, and in 1983, he left the Bernstein Agency.

Subsequently, Coleman chose his son Denardo to manage his career while overcoming his reticence of public performance, which had been rooted in his distrust of doing business with a predominantly White music industry. According to Nicholson, "the man once accused of standing on the throat of jazz was welcomed back to the touring circuits with both curiosity and affection" during the 1980s. Coleman did not record another album for six years and instead performed internationally with Prime Time.

=== Reappraisal ===
Retrospective appraisals have been favorable to Of Human Feelings. In a 1986 article for The New York Times on Coleman's work with Prime Time, Robert Palmer says the album was still innovative and radical by the standards of other music in 1982, three years after it was recorded. Because writers and musicians had heard its test pressing in 1979, the album's mix of jazz improvisation and gritty, punk and funk-derived energy sounded "prophetic" when it was released, Palmer explains. "The album is clearly the progenitor of much that has sounded radically new in the ongoing fusion of punk rock, black dance rhythms, and free jazz."

Although Coleman's compositions never achieved popularity, AllMusic critic Scott Yanow says they succeeded within the context of an album that showcased his distinctive saxophone style, which was high-brow yet catchy. Joshua Klein from The A.V. Club recommends Of Human Feelings as the best album for new listeners of Coleman's harmolodics-based music, while Chicago Tribune rock critic Greg Kot included it in his guide for novice jazz listeners; he named it one of the few albums that helped him both become a better listener of rock music and learn how to enjoy jazz.

In 2008, New York magazine's Martin Johnson included Of Human Feelings in his list of canonical albums from what he feels had been New York's sceneless yet vital jazz of the previous 40 years; Of Human Feelings exudes what he describes as a spirit of sophistication with elements of funk, Latin, and African music, all of which are encapsulated by music that retains a jazz identity.

== Track listing ==
All compositions were written by Ornette Coleman.

Side one
No.	Title	Length
1.	"Sleep Talk"	3:34
2.	"Jump Street"	4:24
3.	"Him and Her"	4:24
4.	"Air Ship"	6:11

Side two
No.	Title	Length
1.	"What Is the Name of That Song?"	3:58
2.	"Job Mob"	4:57
3.	"Love Words"	2:54
4.	"Times Square"	6:03

== Personnel ==
Credits are adapted from the album's liner notes.

Musicians

- Denardo Coleman – drums
- Ornette Coleman – alto saxophone, production
- Charlie Ellerbee – guitar
- Bern Nix – guitar
- Jamaaladeen Tacuma – bass guitar
- Calvin Weston – drums

Additional personnel

- Susan Bernstein – cover painting
- Peter Corriston – cover design
- Joe Gastwirt – mastering
- Ron Saint Germain – engineering
- Ron Goldstein – executive direction
- Harold Jarowsky – second engineering
- Steven Mark Needham – photography
- Ken Robertson – tape operation

== See also ==
- Loft jazz
- Punk jazz

== Bibliography ==
- Albertson, Chris (August 1982). "Popular Music". Stereo Review. 47 (8).
- Anon. (1982). Of Human Feelings (LP liner notes). Ornette Coleman. Antilles Records. AN-2001.
- Anon. (August 28, 1982). "Jazz LPs". Billboard – via Google Books.
- Anon. (February 22, 1983). "The 1982 Pazz & Jop Critics Poll". The Village Voice. New York. Archived from the original on July 9, 2013.
- Anon. (January 4, 1983). "Boston Phoenix Critics' Top 10 Albums for 1982". The Boston Phoenix.
- Anon. (n.d.). "Of Human Feelings – Ornette Colement : Awards". AllMusic.
- Butterworth, Brent (May 26, 2013). "Brent Butterworth on 'Jump Street' by Ornette Coleman". Sound & Vision. Archived from the original on August 11, 2013.
- Christgau, Robert (June 1, 1982). "Christgau's Consumer Guide". The Village Voice. New York. Archived from the original on August 15, 2013.
- Christgau, Robert (February 22, 1983). "Pazz & Jop 1982: Dean's List". The Village Voice. New York. Archived from the original on August 15, 2013.
- Christgau, Robert (January 2, 1990). "Decade Personal Best: '80s". The Village Voice. New York. Archived from the original on August 15, 2013.
- Cohen, Thomas F. (2012). Playing to the Camera: Musicians and Musical Performance in Documentary Cinema. Columbia University Press. ISBN 978-1-906660-22-2.
- Cooper, Kim; Smay, David, eds. (2004). Lost in the Grooves: Scram's Capricious Guide to the Music You Missed. Routledge. ISBN 978-0-415-96998-7.
- Davis, Francis (1986). In the Moment: Jazz in the 1980s. Oxford University Press. ISBN 978-0-19-504090-6.
- Feather, Leonard (June 5, 1982). "Options Widen for Jazz Buffs". Toledo Blade.
- Giddins, Gary (July 1982). "High Notes: The Five Best Recent Releases". Esquire. 98 (1).
- Giddins, Gary (1985). Rhythm-a-Ning: Jazz Tradition and Innovation in the '80s. Oxford University Press. ISBN 978-0-19-503558-2.
- Harrison, Max; Fox, Charles; Thacker, Eric; Nicholson, Stuart (2000). The Essential Jazz Records: Modernism to Postmodernism. The Essential Jazz Records. Vol. 2. Mansell. ISBN 978-0-7201-1822-3.
- Hull, Tom (n.d.). "Jazz (1940–50s) (Reference)". tomhull.com.
- Johnson, Martin (2008). "40th Anniversary: The New York Jazz Canon". New York. Archived from the original on May 12, 2014.
- Keepnews, Peter (January 8, 1983). "Critics' Choice". Billboard – via Google Books.
- Kennedy, Michael; Bourne, Joyce, eds. (2004). The Concise Oxford Dictionary of Music (4th ed.). Oxford University Press. ISBN 978-0-19-860884-4.
- Kenny, Glenn (June 11, 2015). "Ornette Coleman's Uncompromising Genius". Vulture. Archived from the original on July 16, 2015.
- Klein, Joshua (March 29, 2002). "Ornette Coleman: The Complete Science Fiction Sessions". The A.V. Club. Chicago. Archived from the original on May 13, 2014.
- Kot, Greg (April 26, 1998). "A Rock Critic's Education In Jazz". Chicago Tribune. Arts & Entertainment section. Archived from the original on October 5, 2013.
- Larkin, Colin (1998). The Encyclopedia of Popular Music. Vol. 7 (3rd ed.). Muze UK. ISBN 978-1-56159-237-1.
- Litweiler, John (1992). Ornette Coleman: A Harmolodic Life. W. Morrow. ISBN 978-0-688-07212-4.
- Mandel, Howard (2007). Miles, Ornette, Cecil: Jazz Beyond Jazz. Routledge. ISBN 978-0-203-93564-4.
- McRae, Barry; Middleton, Tony (1988). Ornette Coleman. Jazz Masters Series. Apollo. ISBN 978-0-948820-08-3.
- Millevoi, Nick (August 26, 2019). "Jamaaladeen Tacuma: Grooving Hard, Embracing Risk". Premier Guitar.
- Morrison, Buzz (June 24, 1982). "Of Human Feelings". Rolling Stone. No. 372.
- Natambu, Kofi (1982). "The Blues in 4-D: Of Human Feelings by Ornette Colement and the Prime Time Band". Detroit Metro Times. No. June.
- Nelson, Nels; Bittan, Dave; Takiff, Jonathan; Carrier, Jerry (1982). "Kool Jazz Players". Philadelphia Daily News. No. June 4.
- Nicholson, Stuart (1990). Jazz: The 1980s Resurgence. Da Capo Press. ISBN 978-0-306-80612-4.
- Nicholson, Stuart (1998). Jazz Rock: A History. Canongate Books. ISBN 978-0-86241-817-5.
- Palmer, Robert (March 14, 1982). "Ornette Coleman's Prophetic Jazz". The New York Times. Archived from the original on December 22, 2014.
- Palmer, Robert (July 16, 1986). "The Pop Life – Ornette Coleman's Music Develops in Prime Time". The New York Times. Archived from the original on October 2, 2013.
- Rinzler, Paul (2008). The Contradictions of Jazz. Scarecrow Press. ISBN 978-0810862159.
- Sachs, Lloyd (July 27, 1997). "10 jazz-rock standouts". Chicago Sun-Times. (subscription required)
- Sullivan, Dan (July 25, 1982). "Album Briefs". Los Angeles Times. (subscription required)
- Swenson, John, ed. (1985). The Rolling Stone Jazz Record Guide. New York: Random House. ISBN 978-0394726434.
- Tinder, Cliff (April 1982). "Jamaaladeen Tacuma: Electric Bass in the Harmolodic Pocket". Down Beat. 49 (4).
- Weisbard, Eric; Marks, Craig (1995). "Ornette Coleman". Spin Alternative Record Guide. New York: Vintage Books. ISBN 978-0-679-75574-6.
- Wilson, Peter Niklas (1999). Ornette Coleman: His Life and Music. Berkeley Hills Books. ISBN 978-1-893163-04-1.
- Yanow, Scott (n.d.). "Of Human Feelings – Ornette Coleman". AllMusic. Archived from the original on February 16, 2013.
