= In All Languages =

Studio album by Ornette Coleman
- Released: February 1987
- Genres: Free jazz, harmolodic funk
- Length: 73:29
- Label: Caravan of Dreams
- Producer: Denardo Coleman

Ornette Coleman chronology
Song X (1986)	In All Languages (1987)	Virgin Beauty (1988)

In All Languages is a 1987 double album by Ornette Coleman. Coleman and the other members of his 1950s quartet, trumpeter Don Cherry, bassist Charlie Haden, and drummer Billy Higgins, performed on one of the two records, while his electrified ensemble, Prime Time, performed on the other. Many of the songs on In All Languages had two renditions, one by each group.

The double album was originally released by Caravan of Dreams, which also issued the title as a single cassette or compact disc. Coleman's record label, Harmolodic, re-issued In All Languages in 1997 through a marketing and distribution deal with Verve Records.

== Recording and music ==
For the album, Coleman recorded both his original quartet and his newer Prime Time band in the same studio within the same period. Option magazine remarked that In All Languages showcases the differences between his original quartet's free jazz and the harmolodic funk of his Prime Time band. Geoffrey Himes of JazzTimes said the album's approach "may sound very avant-garde, but it's not so different from a Dixieland combo that stands to solo all at once on the final chorus or from a pre-war blues band that shifts from D to D-flat and from 12 bars to 13 in pursuit of a song."

== Critical reception ==
Professional ratings
Review scores
Source	Rating
AllMusic	4/5 stars
The Rolling Stone Album Guide	4.5/5 stars
Spin	8/10
The Village Voice	A

Reviewing the album for The Village Voice in 1987, Robert Christgau applauded Coleman as a persistently lyrical iconoclast and said the Quartet sounded more intense than ever before because of how they follow Coleman's harmolodic funk approach and "the dense flow of Of Human Feelings". In another piece for Playboy, Christgau cited the album as "an ideal introduction" to Coleman's music and remarked that, despite Coleman's restless playing, Prime Time's chemistry and the brevity of the songs "assure a coherence that coexists with constant surprise as in no other music." In All Languages was voted the eleventh best album of the year in The Village Voice's annual Pazz & Jop critics poll for 1987. Christgau, the poll's creator, named it the fourth best album of 1987 in his own list.

In a retrospective review for AllMusic, jazz critic Scott Yanow said that Prime Time "almost makes the acoustic unit sound conservative in comparison. While the quartet displays subtle use of space and interplay between the musicians, Prime Time comes across as overcrowded and loud, but no less stimulating. Highly recommended to fans of Ornette Coleman." Michael G. Nastos, writing for All Music Guide to Jazz, wrote that "the utterly no-nonsense approach and high intensity make this a recording challenged listeners must have," also noting that the quartet's "work is still vital." Lloyd Sachs of the Chicago Sun-Times said that the music is "so compulsively melodic and rhythmically alive, I dare anyone to utter the usual stuff about how 'difficult' Ornette is after a single listening."

== Track listing ==
All compositions by Ornette Coleman, Phrase Text Music, ASCAP. This track listing reflects the original double album configuration.

Side A (the Quartet)
No.	Title	Length
1.	"Peace Warriors"	2:35
2.	"Feet Music"	3:32
3.	"Africa Is the Mirror of All Colors"	2:58
4.	"Word for Bird"	3:16
5.	"Space Church (Continuous Service)"	3:59

Side B (the Quartet)
No.	Title	Length
1.	"Latin Genetics"	3:39
2.	"In All Languages"	3:33
3.	"Sound Manual"	3:08
4.	"Mothers of the Veil"	3:45
5.	"Cloning"	3:14

Side C (Prime Time)
No.	Title	Length
1.	"Music News"	3:00
2.	"Mothers of the Veil"	4:28
3.	"The Art of Love Is Happiness"	2:29
4.	"Latin Genetics"	2:45
5.	"Today, Yesterday and Tomorrow"	3:10
6.	"Listen Up"	2:29
7.	"Feet Music"	3:49

Side D (Prime Time)
No.	Title	Length
1.	"Space Church (Continuous Service)"	4:34
2.	"Cloning"	2:28
3.	"In All Languages"	3:06
4.	"Biosphere"	2:20
5.	"Story Tellers"	2:49
6.	"Peace Warriors"	2:23

== Personnel ==
Sides A and B (the Quartet)

- Ornette Coleman – alto and tenor saxophone
- Don Cherry – trumpet
- Charlie Haden – double bass
- Billy Higgins – drums

Sides C and D (Prime Time)

- Ornette Coleman – saxophone and trumpet
- Denardo Coleman – drums
- Calvin Weston – drums
- Jamaaladeen Tacuma – bass guitar
- Al MacDowell – bass guitar
- Charlie Ellerbee – electric guitar
- Bernie Nix – electric guitar
