= Juicebox (disambiguation) =

A juicebox is a container for holding juice.

Juicebox may also refer to:

- Juice Box, a media player from toy manufacturer Mattel
- "Juicebox" (song), a 2005 song by The Strokes
- Juicebox (TV series), a Canadian television series
- Stingray Juicebox, a Canadian television channel
- Juice Box Records, a UK record label from 1992 to 1998
- "The Juice Box", a nickname for Houston's Minute Maid Park, now Daikin Park

== See also ==
- Juice Boxx, Canadian drag queen
- Juiceboxxx, American rapper
- Jukebox (disambiguation)
