= Denardo Coleman =

American jazz drummer (born 1956)

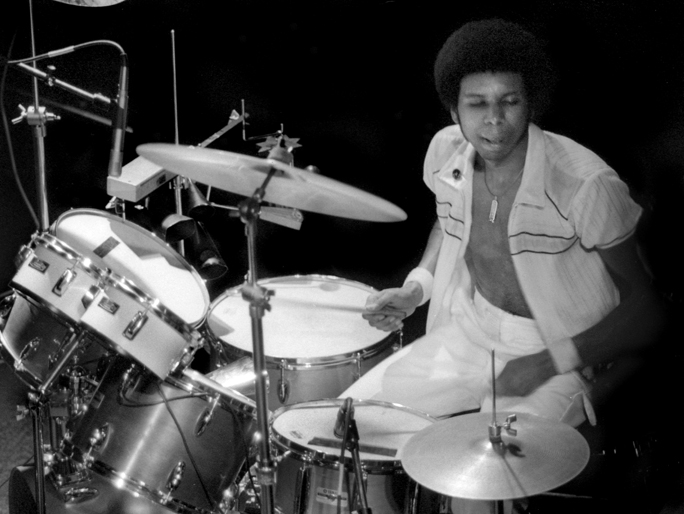
- Coleman playing with Ornette Coleman, Great American Music Hall, San Francisco, October 29, 1981.

Background information
- Born: Denardo Ornette Coleman; April 19, 1956 (age 70)
- Origin: Los Angeles, California, U.S.
- Genres: Jazz
- Occupation: Musician
- Instrument: Drums
- Years active: 1966–present
- Website: denardocoleman.com
- Parent(s): Jayne Cortez and Ornette Coleman

Denardo Ornette Coleman (born April 19, 1956) is an American jazz drummer. He is the son of Ornette Coleman and Jayne Cortez.

== Biography ==
Born to Jayne Cortez and Ornette Coleman in Los Angeles, California, in 1956, Denardo Coleman began playing drums when he was six years old. At the age of 10, he joined his father's band, making his first appearance on record on the 1966 Ornette Coleman album The Empty Foxhole, with Charlie Haden on bass. Haden said of Denardo's playing on that recording: "He's going to startle every drummer who hears him."

Denardo went on to feature on his father's later releases, including Ornette at 12 (1968) and Crisis (1969), and played as a member of Ornette's Prime Time ensemble in the 1970s. He also worked with his mother in the band The Firespitters, and has played with Geri Allen, Pat Metheny, James Blood Ulmer, and Jamaaladeen Tacuma. In the 1980s, Coleman started to manage his father's career, which he continued doing for the next 30 years.

Coleman has also done extensive work as a producer, including on albums by both of his parents, and on In All Languages and Virgin Beauty in the 1980s and Hidden Man and Three Women in the 1990s. In 2017, on a new label called Song X Records (referencing the title of one of his father's favorite compositions), he produced Celebrate Ornette, a tribute to his father, in a box set with 24 performances captured on two DVDs, three CDs, and four vinyl LPs.

== Discography ==
=== As sideman ===
With Ornette Coleman

- The Empty Foxhole (Blue Note, 1966)
- Ornette at 12 (Impulse!, 1968)
- Crisis (Impulse!, 1969; Real Gone Music, 2017)
- Of Human Feelings (Antilles, 1979)
- Song X (Geffen, 1985) with Pat Metheny
- Prime Design/Time Design (Caravan of Dreams, 1985)
- In All Languages (Caravan of Dreams, 1987)
- Virgin Beauty (Portrait, 1988)
- Jazzbühne Berlin '88 (Repertoire, 1988 [1990])
- Tone Dialing (Harmelodic/Verve, 1995)
- Sound Museum: Hidden Man (Harmolodic/Verve, 1996)
- Sound Museum: Three Women (Harmolodic/Verve, 1996)
- Sound Grammar (Sound Grammar, 2006)

With Jayne Cortez & the Firespitters

- Taking the Blues Back Home (Virgin, 1996)
- Borders of Disorderly Time, with Bobby Bradford, Frank Lowe, Al MacDowell, James Blood Ulmer, Charnett Moffett, Bern Nix, T. K. Blue, Alex Harding (Bola Press, 2003)

With James Blood Ulmer

- Tales of Captain Black (Artists House, 1978)

With Charnett Moffett

- Treasure (King Japan, 2010)
