= Prime Design/Time Design =

1985 live album by American jazz composer Ornette Coleman

Live album by Ornette Coleman
- Released: 1985
- Recorded: 1985
- Genre: Jazz
- Label: Caravan of Dreams
- Producer: Kathelin Hoffman

Ornette Coleman chronology
Opening the Caravan of Dreams (1985)	Prime Design/Time Design (1985)	Song X (1986)

Prime Design/Time Design is a live album written by the American jazz composer Ornette Coleman and recorded by a string quartet, with Ornette's son Denardo Coleman on drums, at the Caravan of Dreams in 1985 and released on the Caravan of Dreams label. The composition is dedicated to Coleman's "best hero," Buckminster Fuller, and is an interpretation of Fuller's "vision of the birth of the universe, the fusion of chaos and harmony".

Excerpts from the performance of Prime Design/Time Design appeared in Shirley Clarke's 1985 film Ornette: Made in America.

== Reception ==
Professional ratings
Review scores
Source	Rating
AllMusic	1.5/5 stars

The AllMusic review awarded the album 1½ stars.

Syd Fablo of RockSalted stated that he sees the album as "being in service of an agenda completely independent of genre categories like jazz/classical," and commented: "it is indeed remarkable how Ornette manages to create some of the same 'sourness' of tone that he achieves in his alto saxophone playing through written notation for a string quartet. And yet there is a grim, determined hopefulness to the music."

== Track listing ==
All compositions by Ornette Coleman

1. "Prime Design/Time Design Part 1"
2. "Prime Design/Time Design Part 2"

- Recorded at the Caravan of Dreams in Fort Worth, Texas in 1985 by Ron St.Germain & David Hewitt on the Record Plant NY Black Truck.

== Personnel ==
- Gregory Gelman, Larissa Blitz - violin
- Alex Deych - viola
- Matthew Meister - cello
- Denardo Coleman - drums
