= Jukebox (disambiguation) =

A jukebox is a coin-operated music playing device.

Jukebox may also refer to:

== Entertainment-related ==
- "Jukebox Hero", a song by Foreigner from their 1981 album 4
- "Jukebox (Don't Put Another Dime)", a 1982 single song by The Flirts
- Jukebox (Jamaaladeen Tacuma album), a 1988 album released by jazz musician Jamaaladeen Tacuma
- Jukebox, a 1998 album by Midget
- Jukebox (Bent Fabric album), a 2004 album by Bent Fabric
- Jukebox (Bachman Cummings album), a 2007 covers album released by Randy Bachman and Burton Cummings
- Jukebox (Cat Power album), a 2008 covers album released by American singer Cat Power
- Jukebox (Priscilla Renea album), a 2009 album by Priscilla Renea
- Jukebox (JLS album), a 2011 album by English boy band JLS
- Jukebox (Drifters album), 2013 album by Swedish band the Drifters
- Jukebox (Human Nature album), a 2014 album by Australian pop vocal group Human Nature
- Jukeboxer, moniker of Brooklyn-based musician Noah Wall
- Juke Box Records, a record label
- Jukebox musical, a stage musical or musical film in which a majority of the songs are well-known popular music songs, rather than original music

== Computer-related ==
- Dell Digital Jukebox, a digital audio player
- Electric Jukebox, a music streaming device
- Musicmatch Jukebox, an Internet-based audio player
- Optical jukebox, a mass storage device
- Personal Jukebox, a handheld digital audio player

== Places ==
- San Francisco Marriott Marquis, known for its distinctive "jukebox" appearance
