= The Empty Foxhole =

Studio album by Ornette Coleman
- Released: 1966
- Recorded: September 9, 1966
- Studios: Van Gelder Studio, Englewood Cliffs, NJ
- Genre: Free jazz
- Length: 38:56
- Label: Blue Note
- Producer: Francis Wolff

Ornette Coleman chronology
| At the Golden Circle Stockholm (1965) | The Empty Foxhole (1966) | The Music of Ornette Coleman (1967) |

The Empty Foxhole is an album by the American jazz saxophonist and composer Ornette Coleman that was released on the Blue Note label in 1966. The album features Coleman's untutored violin and trumpet as well as performing on his usual instrument, the alto saxophone, and marks the recording debut of his drummer son Denardo Coleman, who was ten years of age at the time. The album cover features Coleman's own artwork.

== Reception ==
Critical reception of the album was mixed at the time of its release and continues to be. Some, like Shelly Manne and Freddie Hubbard, regarded Denardo's drumming as rudimentary and judged the move a mistake. Others noted that despite his youth, Denardo had studied drumming for several years and his technique – which, though unrefined, was respectable and enthusiastic – owed more to pulse-oriented free jazz drummers like Sunny Murray than to bebop drumming. The AllMusic review by Steve Huey awarded the album 3 stars and stated: "On balance, the music may not be among Coleman's most exceptional efforts, but there's something inspiring about the fact that The Empty Foxhole is as good as it is." The All About Jazz review by Robert Spencer stated: "Ornette Coleman is not a conventional musician, but he has too much musical talent to make a bad album... The music here is unlike most everything else that ever came out of Blue Note, or anywhere, but those who won't notice or care that these guys are not the smoothest of instrumentalists might enjoy this album. I do."

Professional ratings
Review scores
| Source | Rating |
|---|---|
| AllMusic | 3/5 stars |
| The Rolling Stone Jazz Record Guide | 3/5 stars |

== Track listing ==
All compositions by Ornette Coleman

1. "Good Old Days" – 6:52
2. "The Empty Foxhole" – 3:22
3. "Sound Gravitation" – 7:18
4. "Freeway Express" – 8:20
5. "Faithful" – 7:07
6. "Zig Zag" – 5:57

== Personnel ==
- Ornette Coleman - alto saxophone (tracks 1, 5, 6), trumpet (2, 4), violin (3)
- Charlie Haden - bass
- Denardo Coleman - drums
