= Virgin Beauty =

Studio album by Ornette Coleman
- Released: February 18, 1988
- Genre: Jazz
- Length: 44:49
- Label: Portrait
- Producer: Denardo Coleman

Ornette Coleman chronology
In All Languages (1987)	Virgin Beauty (1988)	Tone Dialing (1995)

Virgin Beauty is an album by Ornette Coleman and his Prime Time ensemble. It was released by Portrait Records in 1988.

Three of the album's tracks feature guitarist Jerry Garcia, whose involvement in the recording dates back to September 1987, when Coleman, his son Denardo, and Cecil Taylor attended a Grateful Dead concert. After the concert, Coleman invited Garcia to the recording session for Virgin Beauty. In February 1993, Prime Time opened for the Dead at a show in Oakland, and Coleman participated in the Dead's "space jam" portion of the concert.

== Reception ==
Professional ratings
Review scores
Source	Rating
AllMusic	3.5/5 stars
Christgau's Record Guide	A
Tom Hull	A−
The Penguin Guide to Jazz Recordings	3/4 stars
The Rolling Stone Album Guide	4/5 stars

Virgin Beauty reached the number two position on Billboard's jazz chart and sold more in its first year of release than any previous Coleman record.

In his review for AllMusic, Scott Yanow noted that "the music is frequently exciting, but will take several listens to absorb. Worth investigating".

David Fricke of Rolling Stone commented: "More than a few Deadheads invested in Virgin Beauty solely because of Jerry Garcia's presence on three tracks. But it's a safe bet they were pleasantly surprised by Prime Time's infectious propulsion and the emotive strength and striking warmth of Coleman's sax statements."

Author Michael Stephans remarked: "Virgin Beauty is filled with many bright moments, a vibrant spirit, and an almost irrepressible earthiness. It is one of a number of good starting points for the new listener who wants to know more about Ornette's Prime Time and its musical evolution, with the added bonus of choosing any number of tracks and dancing to them!"

== Track listing ==
1. "3 Wishes" – 4:23
2. "Bourgeois Boogie" – 5:11
3. "Happy Hour" – 4:49
4. "Virgin Beauty" – 3:34
5. "Healing the Feeling" – 5:21
6. "Singing in the Shower" – 4:26
7. "Desert Players" – 4:24
8. "Honeymooners" – 4:24
9. "Chanting" – 3:01
10. "Spelling the Alphabet" – 1:30
11. "Unknown Artist" – 4:12

== Personnel ==
- Ornette Coleman – saxophone, trumpet, violin
- Denardo Coleman – drums, keyboards, percussion
- Charles Ellerbie – guitar
- Jerry Garcia – Guitar on "3 Wishes", "Singing in the Shower", "Desert Players"
- Albert MacDowell – double bass
- Bern Nix – guitar
- Chris Walker – bass
- Calvin Weston – drums
