= Jukebox (Jamaaladeen Tacuma album) =

Studio album by Jamaaladeen Tacuma
- Released: 1988
- Recorded: September–October 1987
- Length: 42:26
- Label: Gramavision
- Producer: Jonathan F.P. Rose, Jamaaladeen Tacuma

Jamaaladeen Tacuma chronology
Music World (1986)	Jukebox (1988)	Boss of the Bass (1991)

Professional ratings
Review scores
Source	Rating
AllMusic	link

Jukebox is an album by Jamaaladeen Tacuma. It was recorded from September to October 1987 and was released in 1988 by Gramavision. It was produced by Jonathan F.P. Rose and Jamaaladeen Tacuma.

== Track listing ==
1. "A Time A Place" – 4:20
2. "Meta-Morphosis" – 6:28
3. "Rhythm Of Your Mind" – 1:40
4. "Jam-All" – 3:24
5. "In The Mood For Mood" – 6:18
6. "Jukebox" – 5:37
7. "Naima" – 5:18
8. "Zam Zam Was Such A Wonderful Feeling" – 4:55
9. "Solar System Blues" – 5:04

== Personnel ==
- Jamaaladeen Tacuma – Synthesizer, bass, drums, bass guitar, electric guitar, producer, engineer, fretless bass, mixing
- Ronnie Drayton – Guitar, electric guitar
- Frederick Phineas – Harmonica
- Alfie Pollit – Synthesizer
- Dennis Alston – Percussion, drums
- Byard Lancaster – Flute, saxophone, tenor saxophone, pan flute, bird calls
- Alan Sukennik – Organ, synthesizer, piano, cello, keyboards, Korg synthesizer

== Credits ==
- Tim Casey – Mixing, mixing assistant
- Phoebe Ferguson – Photography
- Joe Ferla – Engineer, mixing
- Angela Gomez – Assistant engineer
- Fred Guyot – Paintings, cover painting
- Bob Ludwig – Mastering
- Jonathan F.P. Rose – Producer, mixing
