= Bern Nix =

American jazz guitarist

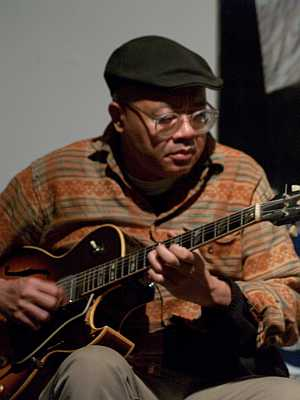
- Bern Nix, Les Gallery Clemente Soto Velez, February 2005

Background information
- Born: September 21, 1947; Toledo, Ohio, U.S.
- Died: May 31, 2017 (aged 69) New York City, U.S.
- Genres: Avant-garde jazz
- Occupation: Musician
- Instrument: Guitar
- Years active: 1975–2017
- Label: Tompkins Square

Bern Nix (September 21, 1947 – May 31, 2017) was an American jazz guitarist. He recorded and performed with Ornette Coleman from 1975 to 1987 in Coleman's Prime Time band.

== Career ==
A native of Toledo, Ohio, Nix was introduced to music in childhood and began playing the guitar at eleven years old. He listened intently to jazz guitarists, including Wes Montgomery, Jimmy Raney, Barney Kessel, and Charlie Christian. In 1975 he graduated from the Berklee College of Music. For the next twelve years, he played guitar in Prime Time, Ornette Coleman's electric band.

Nix led a trio with bassist William Parker and drummer David Cappello from 1985. In 1993, the trio of Newman Baker and Fred Hopkins released the album Alarms and Excursions. Nix then led a trio with bassist Bill Zola and drummer Adrian Valosin from October 1994 — December 2005. Nix released the solo album Low Barometer on Tompkins Square Records in September 2006. His composition "Les is More" appears on Art and Money, an album released by 1687, Inc. in 2006. In 2013, the Bern Nix Quartet, featuring Francois Grillot, Reggie Sylvester, and Matt Lavelle, released Negative Capability.

He also worked with Jayne Cortez, Marc Ribot, Elliott Sharp, Jemeel Moondoc, Ronald Shannon Jackson, and John Zorn.

== Discography ==
=== As leader ===
- Alarms and Excursions (New World/Counter Currents, 1993)
- Low Barometer (Tompkins Square, 2006)
- Negative Capability (56 Kitchen, 2013)
- Tangerine (Milan, 2015)

=== As sideman ===
With Ornette Coleman

- Dancing in Your Head (Horizon, 1977)
- Body Meta (Artists House, 1978)
- Of Human Feelings (Antilles, 1982)
- Opening the Caravan of Dreams (Caravan of Dreams, 1985)
- In All Languages (Caravan of Dreams, 1987)
- Virgin Beauty (Portrait, 1988)
- Prime Time Live (Repertoire, 1990)

With Jayne Cortez

- Unsubmissive Blues (Bola Press, 1980)
- There It Is (Bola Press, 1982)
- Maintain Control (Bola Press, 1986)
- Everywhere Drums (Bola Press, 1990)
- Poetry & Music (Tradition & Moderne, 1994)
- Cheerful & Optimistic (Bola Press, 1994)
- Taking the Blues Back Home (Harmolodic/Verve, 1996)
- Borders of Disorderly Time (Bola Press, 2003)

With Jemeel Moondoc

- Nostalgia in Times Square (Soul Note, 1986)
- Spirit House (Eremite, 2000)
- Live at the Vision Festival (Ayler, 2003)

With others

- James Chance and the Contortions, Live in New York (ROIR, 1981)
- Ronald Shannon Jackson, Eye on You (About Time, 1980)
- Frank Lowe, Lowe-Down & Blue (CIMP, 2002)
- Hotel X, "Uncommon Ground", featuring Bern Nix and Greg Ginn (SST, 2003)
