= Song X =

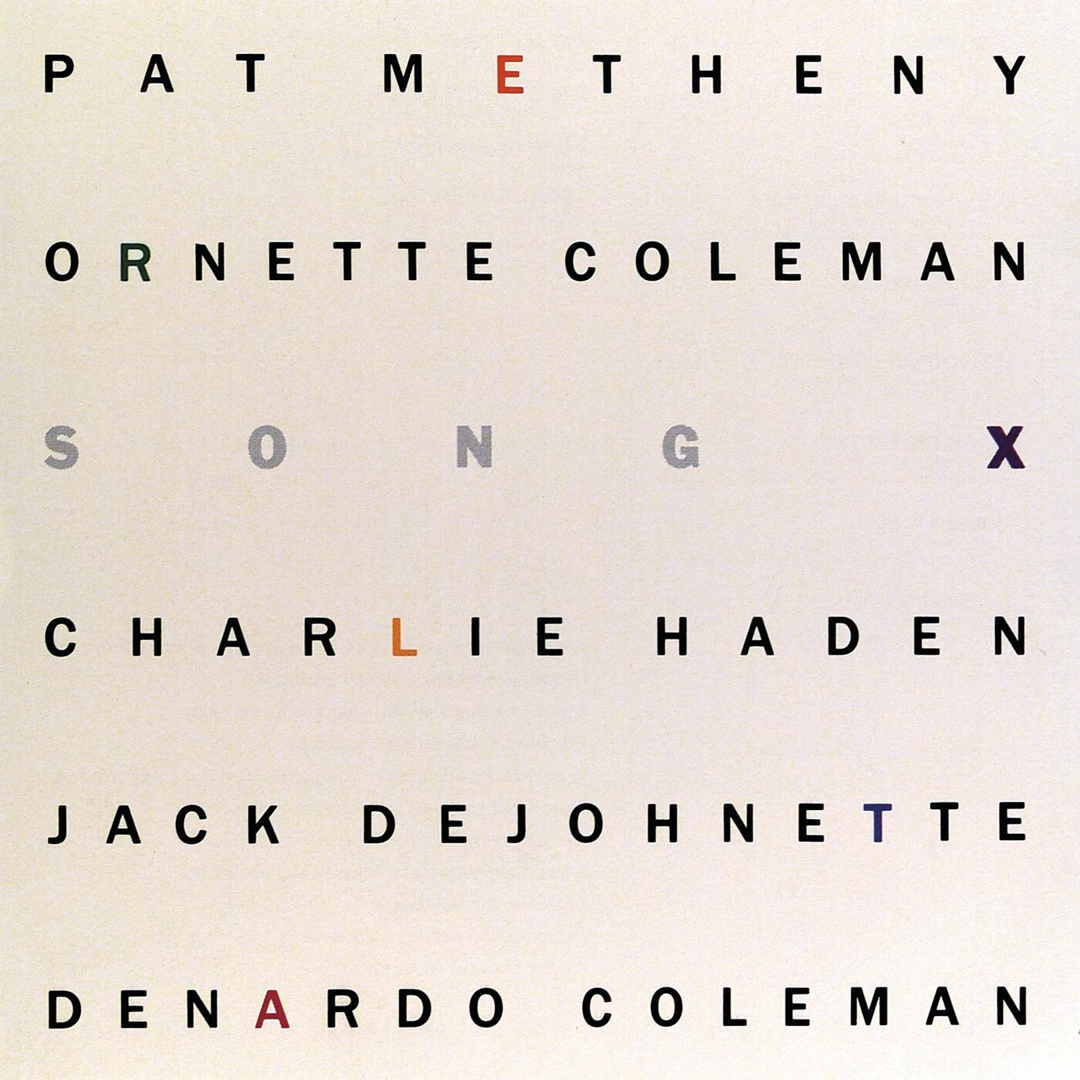

Studio album by Pat Metheny and Ornette Coleman
- Released: April 14, 1986
- Recorded: December 12–14, 1985
- Studio: Power Station, New York City
- Genre: Free jazz
- Length: 48:39
- Label: Geffen
- Producer: Pat Metheny

Pat Metheny chronology
The Falcon and the Snowman (1984)	Song X (1986)	Still Life (Talking) (1987)

Ornette Coleman chronology
Prime Design/Time Design (1985)	Song X (1985)	In All Languages (1987)

Alternate cover
- 20th anniversary edition cover

Song X is a collaborative studio album by jazz guitarist Pat Metheny and saxophonist Ornette Coleman. It is a free jazz record that was produced in a three-day recording session in 1985. The album was released in 1986 by Geffen Records.

== Background ==
Metheny was a longtime admirer of the saxophonist, recording Coleman compositions on Bright Size Life (1976), 80/81 (1980), and Rejoicing (1984) (which features Coleman alumni Charlie Haden and Billy Higgins). During the three weeks leading up to the recording, Coleman and Metheny spent "between 6 and 12 hours a day every day, playing, hanging out and talking, trying to come up with a vocabulary for this particular session ... that would be different."

Coleman's saxophone tone, when combined with a saxophone preset on Metheny's Synclavier guitar synthesizer, created an "ensemble blend [that] was surprising to both of us."

The album features bassist Charlie Haden (a frequent Coleman collaborator who'd also played on 80/81), Jack DeJohnette on drums, and Coleman's son Denardo on drums and various percussion instruments. It was recorded at The Power Station in New York City between December 12 and December 14, 1985. A remixed and remastered version was issued on CD in August 2005, titled Song X: Twentieth Anniversary. Six unreleased tracks were added prior to the original eight songs.

== Critical reception ==
Professional ratings
Review scores
Source	Rating
AllMusic	3.5/5 stars
Blender	4/5 stars
DownBeat	5/5 stars
Entertainment Weekly	A−
The Guardian	4/5 stars
Mojo	4/5 stars
The Penguin Guide to Jazz	4/4 stars
The Rolling Stone Album Guide	5/5 stars
The Village Voice	A
Tom Hull	A−

Reviewing Song X in 1986 for The Village Voice, Robert Christgau deemed it Coleman's best album of unadulterated jazz since the early 1970s and believed Metheny's mild mannered style of jazz kept the music uncluttered compared to some of Coleman's recent work. "No rock moves, and no funk, harmolodic or otherwise", Christgau added. "It's all sweet lyricism, sonic comedy, and headlong invention." DownBeat magazine hailed the album as "a remarkable union of the true and the new, a fusion of the bedrock human sound of Ornette's alto with the sometimes jarring, mostly bracing electronic capabilities of Pat's guitar-synth". Jon Pareles wrote in The New York Times that the experiment succeeded because both artists were masterful melodists, finding the record "less tangled and more directly songful than Mr. Coleman's recent albums with Prime Time". Song X was voted the nineteenth best album of 1986 in The Village Voice's annual Pazz & Jop critics poll.

In The Penguin Guide to Jazz (2004), Richard Cook and Brian Morton said the more adventurous recordings on Song X showcased the jubilant playing between Coleman and Metheny, who not only "powered his way through Coleman's itinerary with utter conviction, he set up opportunities for the saxophonist to resolve and created a fusion with which Coleman's often impenetrable Prime Time bands had failed to come to terms." In a review of the album's 2005 reissue, Christgau wrote in Blender that all six bonus tracks were "strong enough to justify kicking off with them, and the perfect warm-up to an album Metheny was right to construct exactly as he did." In his list for 2005 Pazz & Jop poll, he named its twentieth anniversary edition the sixteenth best album of the year.

== Track listing ==
All tracks are written by Ornette Coleman except where noted.

Side one:
No.	Title	Writer(s)	Length
1.	"Song X"		5:38
2.	"Mob Job"		4:13
3.	"Endangered Species"	Coleman, Metheny	13:19

Side two:
No.	Title	Writer(s)	Length
1.	"Video Games"		5:21
2.	"Kathelin Gray"	Coleman, Metheny	4:15
3.	"Trigonometry"	Coleman, Metheny	5:09
4.	"Song X Duo"	Coleman, Metheny	3:08
5.	"Long Time No See"		7:36

Song X: Twentieth Anniversary (2005)
No.	Title	Length
1.	"Police People"	4:57
2.	"All of Us"	0:15
3.	"The Good Life"	3:25
4.	"Word from Bird"	3:48
5.	"Compute"	2:03
6.	"The Veil"	3:42
7.	"Song X"	5:38
8.	"Mob Job"	4:13
9.	"Endangered Species"	13:19
10.	"Video Games"	5:21
11.	"Kathelin Gray"	4:15
12.	"Trigonometry"	5:09
13.	"Song X Duo"	3:08
14.	"Long Time No See"	7:36

Note

- Tracks 1–6 are unreleased new tracks.

== Personnel ==
- Pat Metheny – guitar, guitar synthesizer, liner notes
- Ornette Coleman – alto saxophone, violin
- Charlie Haden – double bass
- Jack DeJohnette – drums
- Denardo Coleman – drums, percussion

== Technical ==
- Pat Metheny – producer
- David Oakes, Niki Gatos – assistant producer (original release)
- Jan-Erik Kongshaug – recording (original release)
- Jan-Erik Kongshaug, Rob Eaton – mixing (original release)
- Jon Goldberger – assistant engineer (original release)
- Peter Karam – remixing 2005 (CD reissue)
- Bob Ludwig – mastering at Masterdisk, NYC, USA (original release)
- Ted Jensen – remastering 2005 at Sterling Sound, NYC, USA (CD reissue)
- David A. Cantor – photography (original release)
- Norman Moore – design (original release)
- Doyle Partners – redesign 2005 (CD reissue)

== Charts ==
Year	Chart	Position
1986	Billboard Top Jazz Albums	9
