= DownBeat =

American jazz magazine (founded 1934)

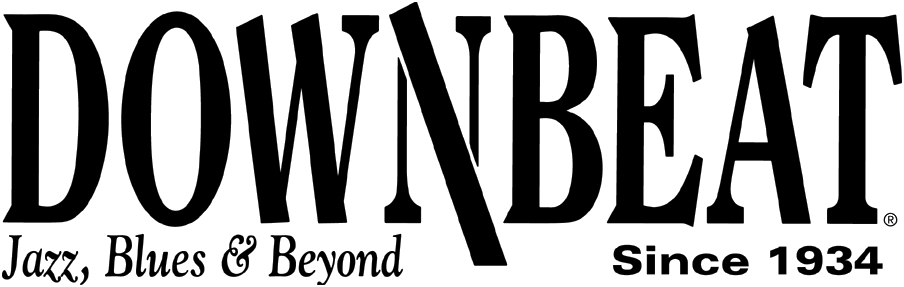
- Categories: Music magazine
- Frequency: Monthly
- Founded: 1934; 92 years ago
- Company: Maher Publications
- Country: United States
- Based in: Chicago, Illinois, U.S.
- Language: English
- Website: www.downbeat.com
- ISSN: 0012-5768
- OCLC: 2260489

DownBeat is an American music magazine devoted to "jazz, blues and beyond", the last word indicating its expansion beyond the jazz realm that it covered exclusively in previous years. The publication was established in 1934 in Chicago, Illinois. It is named after the "downbeat" in music, also called "beat one" or the first beat of a musical measure.

DownBeat publishes results of annual surveys of both its readers and critics in a variety of categories. The DownBeat Jazz Hall of Fame includes winners from both the readers' and critics' poll. The results of the readers' poll are published in the December issue, those of the critics' poll in the August issue. Since 2008, the Hall of Fame also includes winners from the Veterans Committee.

Popular features of DownBeat magazine include its "Reviews" section (where jazz critics, using a 1-to-5-star rating system, rate the latest musical recordings, vintage recordings, and books), articles on individual musicians and music forms, and its famous "Blindfold Test" column (in which a musician listens to records by other artists, tries to guess who they are, and rates them using the 5-star maximum rating system).

== History ==
DownBeat was established in 1934 in Chicago, Illinois. In September 1939, the magazine announced that its circulation had increased from "a few hundred five years ago to more than 80,000 copies a month", and that it would change from monthly to fortnightly from the following month. In the summer of 1960, DownBeat launched its Japanese edition. Don DeMicheal was editor-in-chief of DownBeat from 1961 to 1967. In 1972, the publisher of the magazine was Maher Publishers. Starting in July 1979, DownBeat went to a monthly schedule for the first time since 1939.

DownBeat was named Jazz Publication of the Year in 2016, 2017, 2018, 2019, and 2021 by the Jazz Journalists Association.

== DownBeat Jazz Hall of Fame ==
The DownBeat Jazz Hall of Fame's current membership, by year, is listed in the following table. The Readers' Poll began in 1952, the Critics' Poll in 1961, and the Veterans Committee Poll in 2008.

Year	Readers' Poll	Critics' Poll	Veterans Committee Poll
1952	Louis Armstrong		
1953	Glenn Miller		
1954	Stan Kenton		
1955	Charlie Parker		
1956	Duke Ellington		
1957	Benny Goodman		
1958	Count Basie		
1959	Lester Young		
1960	Dizzy Gillespie		
1961	Billie Holiday	Coleman Hawkins	
1962	Miles Davis	Bix Beiderbecke	
1963	Thelonious Monk	Jelly Roll Morton	
1964	Eric Dolphy	Art Tatum	
1965	John Coltrane	Earl Hines	
1966	Bud Powell	Charlie Christian	
1967	Billy Strayhorn	Bessie Smith	
1968	Wes Montgomery	Sidney Bechet & Fats Waller	
1969	Ornette Coleman	Pee Wee Russell & Jack Teagarden	
1970	Jimi Hendrix	Johnny Hodges	
1971	Charles Mingus	Roy Eldridge & Django Reinhardt	
1972	Gene Krupa	Clifford Brown	
1973	Sonny Rollins	Fletcher Henderson	
1974	Buddy Rich	Ben Webster	
1975	Cannonball Adderley	Cecil Taylor	
1976	Woody Herman	King Oliver	
1977	Paul Desmond	Benny Carter	
1978	Joe Venuti	Rahsaan Roland Kirk	
1979	Ella Fitzgerald	Lennie Tristano	
1980	Dexter Gordon	Max Roach	
1981	Art Blakey	Bill Evans	
1982	Art Pepper	Fats Navarro	
1983	Stéphane Grappelli	Albert Ayler	
1984	Oscar Peterson	Sun Ra	
1985	Sarah Vaughan	Zoot Sims	
1986	Stan Getz	Gil Evans	
1987	Lionel Hampton	Johnny Dodds, Thad Jones, Teddy Wilson	
1988	Jaco Pastorius	Kenny Clarke	
1989	Woody Shaw	Chet Baker	
1990	Red Rodney	Mary Lou Williams	
1991	Lee Morgan	John Carter	
1992	Maynard Ferguson	James P. Johnson	
1993	Gerry Mulligan	Ed Blackwell	
1994	Dave Brubeck	Frank Zappa	
1995	J. J. Johnson	Julius Hemphill	
1996	Horace Silver	Artie Shaw	
1997	Nat King Cole	Tony Williams	
1998	Frank Sinatra	Elvin Jones	
1999	Milt Jackson	Betty Carter	
2000	Clark Terry	Lester Bowie	
2001	Joe Henderson	Milt Hinton	
2002	Antonio Carlos Jobim	John Lewis	
2003	Ray Brown	Wayne Shorter	
2004	McCoy Tyner	Roy Haynes	
2005	Herbie Hancock	Steve Lacy	
2006	Jimmy Smith	Jackie McLean	
2007	Michael Brecker	Andrew Hill	
2008	Keith Jarrett	Joe Zawinul	Jo Jones, Jimmie Lunceford, Erroll Garner, Harry Carney, Jimmy Blanton
2009	Freddie Hubbard	Hank Jones	Oscar Pettiford, Tadd Dameron
2010	Muhal Richard Abrams	Chick Corea	Baby Dodds, Chick Webb, Philly Joe Jones, Billy Eckstine
2011	Ahmad Jamal	Abbey Lincoln	Paul Chambers
2012	Ron Carter	Paul Motian	Gene Ammons, Sonny Stitt
2013	Pat Metheny	Charlie Haden	Robert Johnson
2014	B.B. King	Jim Hall	Bing Crosby, Dinah Washington
2015	Tony Bennett	Lee Konitz	Muddy Waters
2016	Phil Woods	Randy Weston	Hoagy Carmichael
2017	Wynton Marsalis	Don Cherry	Eubie Blake, George Gershwin, Herbie Nichols
2018	Ray Charles	Benny Golson	Marian McPartland
2019	Hank Mobley	Nina Simone	Scott LaFaro, Joe Williams
2020	George Benson	Jimmy Heath	Mildred Bailey, Carmen McRae
2021	Roy Hargrove	Carla Bley	Booker Little, Yusef Lateef
2022	Kenny Barron	Geri Allen	
2023	Pharoah Sanders	Alice Coltrane	Red Norvo, Mario Bauza
2024	John McLaughlin	Charles Lloyd	
2025	Jack DeJohnette	Anthony Braxton	Tito Puente
2026	Kenny Burrell	Sheila Jordan	Jaki Byard

== Awards ==
=== Album of the Year ===
==== Critics' Poll ====
Year	Title	Musician	Label
1965	A Love Supreme	John Coltrane	Impulse!
1966	At the Golden Circle, Vol. 1	Ornette Coleman Trio	Blue Note
1967	The Popular Duke Ellington	Duke Ellington	RCA
1968	The Far East Suite	Duke Ellington	Bluebird/RCA
1969	...And His Mother Called Him Bill	Duke Ellington	Bluebird/RCA
1970	Bitches Brew	Miles Davis	Columbia
1971	New Orleans Suite	Duke Ellington	Atlantic
1972	The You and Me That Used to Be	Jimmy Rushing	RCA
1973 (tie)	Constellation	Sonny Stitt	Cobblestone
1973 (tie)	Sahara	McCoy Tyner	Milestone
1974	Solo Concerts	Keith Jarrett	ECM
1975	Silent Tongues	Cecil Taylor	Freedom
1976	Oscar Peterson and Dizzy Gillespie	Oscar Peterson & Dizzy Gillespie	Pablo
1977	Creative Orchestra Music 1976	Anthony Braxton	Arista
1978 (tie)	Insights	Toshiko Akiyoshi – Lew Tabackin Big Band	RCA
1978 (tie)	Dancing in Your Head	Ornette Coleman	Horizon
1978 (tie)	Sophisticated Giant	Dexter Gordon	Columbia
1978 (tie)	Homecoming: Live at the Village Vanguard	Dexter Gordon	Columbia
1978 (tie)	Nonaah	Roscoe Mitchell	Nessa
1979	Cumbia & Jazz Fusion	Charles Mingus	Atlantic
1980	Air Lore	Air	Arista/Novus
1981	Full Force	Art Ensemble of Chicago	ECM
1982	Playing	Old and New Dreams	ECM
1983	Blues Forever	Muhal Richard Abrams	Black Saint
1984	The Ballad of the Fallen	Charlie Haden	ECM
1985	That's the Way I Feel Now	Various	A&M
1986	The African Flower	James Newton	Blue Note
1987	Song X	Pat Metheny & Ornette Coleman	Geffen
1988	In All Languages	Ornette Coleman	Caravan of Dreams
1989	Audio-Visualscapes	Jack DeJohnette	Impulse!
1990	In East Berlin	Cecil Taylor	FMP
1991	Dream Keeper	Charlie Haden	Blue Note
1992	Lush Life	Joe Henderson	Verve
1993	So Near, So Far (Musings for Miles)	Joe Henderson	Verve
1994	Always Say Goodbye	Charlie Haden	Verve
1995	Rush Hour	Joe Lovano & Gunther Schuller	Verve
1996	Keith Jarrett at the Blue Note	Keith Jarrett Standards Trio	ECM
1997	Sound Museum: Hidden Man	Ornette Coleman Quartet	Harmolodic/Verve
1998	Nashville	Bill Frisell	Nonesuch
1999	Gershwin's World	Herbie Hancock	Verve
2000	Soul on Soul	Dave Douglas	RCA
2001	Dusk	Andrew Hill	Palmetto
2002	Not for Nothin'	Dave Holland	ECM
2003	Footprints Live!	Wayne Shorter Quartet	Verve
2004	Extended Play: Live at Birdland	Dave Holland Quintet	ECM
2005	Concert in the Garden	Maria Schneider	ArtistShare
2006	Time Lines	Andrew Hill	Blue Note
2007	Sound Grammar	Ornette Coleman	Sound Grammar
2008	Sky Blue	Maria Schneider	ArtistShare
2009	Road Shows, Vol. 1	Sonny Rollins	Doxy/EmArcy
2010	Historicity	Vijay Iyer	ACT
2011	Ten	Jason Moran	Blue Note
2012	Accelerando	Vijay Iyer	ACT
2013	Without a Net	Wayne Shorter Quartet	Blue Note
2014	WomanChild	Cécile McLorin Salvant	Mack Avenue
2015	Bird Calls	Rudresh Mahanthappa	ACT
2016	The Epic	Kamasi Washington	Brainfeeder
2017	America's National Parks	Wadada Leo Smith	Cuneiform
2018	Dreams and Daggers	Cécile McLorin Salvant	Mack Avenue
2019	Emanon	Wayne Shorter	Blue Note
2020	Waiting Game	Terri Lyne Carrington	Motéma Music
2021	Data Lords	Maria Schneider Orchestra	ArtistShare
2022	Jesup Wagon	James Brandon Lewis and the Red Lily Quintet	Tao Forms
2023	Amaryllis & Belladonna	Mary Halvorson	Nonesuch
2024	The Sky Will Still Be There Tomorrow	Charles Lloyd	Blue Note
2025	Breaking Stretch	Patricia Brennan	Pyroclastic
2026	Of the Near and Far	Patricia Brennan	Pyroclastic

=== Lifetime Achievement Award ===
- 1981: John H. Hammond
- 1982: George Wein
- 1983: Leonard Feather
- 1984: Billy Taylor
- 1985: Lawrence Berk
- 1986: Orrin Keepnews
- 1987: David Baker
- 1988: John Conyers Jr.
- 1989: Norman Granz
- 1990: Rudy Van Gelder
- 1991: Bill Cosby
- 1992: Rich Matteson
- 1993: Gunther Schuller
- 1994: Marian McPartland
- 1995: Willis Conover
- 1996: Chuck Suber
- 1997: William P. Gottlieb
- 1998: Bruce Lundvall
- 1999: Sheldon Meyer
- 2000: George Avakian
- 2001: Milt Gabler
- 2002:
- 2003:
- 2004:
- 2005: Creed Taylor
- 2006: Claude Nobs
- 2007: Dan Morgenstern
- 2008:
- 2009:
- 2010: Manfred Eicher
- 2011:
- 2012:
- 2013:
- 2014:
- 2015:
- 2016:
- 2017: George Avakian
- 2018:
- 2019:
- 2020:
- 2021:
- 2022: Gretchen Valade
- 2023: Randall Kline

== See also ==
- The Mary Lou Williams Women in Jazz Award
- International Association for Jazz Education (IAJE)
- BBC Jazz Awards
- NEA Jazz Masters
