= Dancing in Your Head =

Studio album by Ornette Coleman
- Released: 1977
- Recorded: January 1973 – December 28, 1975
- Genre: Jazz fusion; jazz-funk; free jazz; free funk
- Length: 31:24
- Label: Horizon
- Producer: Ornette Coleman

Ornette Coleman chronology
To Whom Who Keeps a Record (1975)	Dancing in Your Head (1977)	Soapsuds, Soapsuds (1977)

Professional ratings
Review scores
Source	Rating
Allmusic	4/5 stars
Rolling Stone	(favorable)
The Rolling Stone Jazz Record Guide	4/5 stars
Tom Hull	A
The Village Voice	A
The Penguin Guide to Jazz Recordings	4/4 stars

Dancing in Your Head is a studio album by Ornette Coleman, released in 1977 by Horizon Records.

== Recording ==
The two variations on "Theme from a Symphony" were the first recordings to feature Coleman's electric band, which later became known as Prime Time. The symphony referenced in the title of the two tracks is Coleman's Skies of America.

William S. Burroughs was present for the recording of "Midnight Sunrise", which was recorded with the Master Musicians of Jajouka in 1973. The compact disc reissue features an alternate take of this composition which is not present on the vinyl or earlier CD issue.

== Release ==
Dancing in Your Head was released on Horizon Records in 1977. In 2000, it was remastered and re-released on A&M/Verve/Universal Records.

== Critical reception ==
Dancing in Your Head was voted the 15th best album of the year in The Village Voice's annual Pazz & Jop critics poll for 1977. It was the first album by a jazz artist to make the poll. Robert Christgau, the poll's creator, ranked it number 11 on his own year-end list.

The album was identified by Chris Kelsey in his Allmusic essay "Free Jazz: A Subjective History" as one of the "20 Essential Free Jazz Albums".

== Legacy ==
"Midnight Sunrise" was featured in the 1991 film Naked Lunch.

== Track listing ==
Side A
No.	Title	Length
1.	"Theme from a Symphony (variation one)"	15:47

Side B
No.	Title	Length
2.	"Theme from a Symphony (variation two)"	11:10
3.	"Midnight Sunrise"	4:45
Total length:		31:24

2000 CD bonus track
No.	Title	Length
4.	"Midnight Sunrise (alternate take)"	3:49
Total length:		35:31

== Personnel ==
- Ornette Coleman – alto saxophone
- Bern Nix – electric guitar
- Charlie Ellerbee – electric guitar
- Jamaaladeen Tacuma – bass guitar
- Shannon Jackson – drums
- Robert Palmer – clarinet on "Midnight Sunrise"
- Master Musicians of Jajouka on "Midnight Sunrise"
