= Free funk =

Music fusion genre which combines funk music with avant-garde jazz

- Stylistic origins: Free jazz; avant-garde jazz; jazz fusion; free improvisation; funk; jazz-funk
- Cultural origins: 1970s, United States
- Typical instruments: Saxophone; guitar; bass guitar; drums
- Derivative forms: M-Base, avant-funk

Free-funk is a combination of avant-garde jazz with funk music that developed in the 1970s. Leaders of the genre include Ornette Coleman and his Prime Time group, Ronald Shannon Jackson and his group Decoding Society, Jamaaladeen Tacuma and his group Spectacle and James "Blood" Ulmer. The music has also been quite influential on the M-Base genre.

== See also ==
- Harmolodic funk
- List of free funk musicians
- Avant-funk
