= Harmolodics =

Musical philosophy

Harmolodics is a musical philosophy and method of musical composition and improvisation developed by American jazz saxophonist-composer Ornette Coleman. His work following this philosophy during the late 1970s and 1980s inspired a style of forward-thinking jazz-funk known as harmolodic funk. It is associated with avant-garde jazz and free jazz, although its implications extend beyond these limits. Coleman also used the name "Harmolodic" for both his first website and his record label.

== Description ==
Coleman defined harmolodics as "the use of the physical and the mental of one's own logic made into an expression of sound to bring about the musical sensation of unison executed by a single person or with a group". Applied to the particulars of music, this means that "harmony, melody, speed, rhythm, time and phrases all have equal position in the results that come from the placing and spacing of ideas". (see: aspects of music)

Harmolodics seeks to free musical compositions from any tonal center, allowing harmonic progression independent of traditional European notions of tension and release (see: atonality). Harmolodics may loosely be defined as an expression of music in which harmony, movement of sound, and melody all share the same value. The general effect is that music achieves an immediately open expression, without being constrained by tonal limitations, rhythmic pre-determination, or harmonic rules.

Ronald Radano suggests that Coleman's concepts of harmonic unison and harmolodics were influenced by Pierre Boulez's theory of aleatory while Gunther Schuller suggested that harmolodics is based on the superimposition of the same or similar phrases, thus creating polytonality and heterophony.

Coleman had been preparing a book called The Harmolodic Theory since at least the 1970s, but this remains unpublished. The only other known explanation of harmolodics that was written by Coleman is a DownBeat article called "Prime Time for Harmolodics" (1983).

Proponents include James Blood Ulmer and Jamaaladeen Tacuma. Ulmer, who played and toured with Coleman during the 1970s, has adopted harmolodics and applied the theories to his approach to jazz and blues guitar (for example, Harmolodic Guitar with Strings).

== Record label ==
Harmolodic Inc.
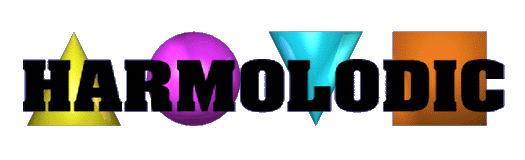
- Founded: 1995
- Founder: Ornette Coleman, Denardo Coleman
- Distributor(s): Verve/PolyGram
- Genre: Jazz, spoken word
- Country of origin: United States
- Location: Harlem, New York

In 1995, Coleman and his son, Denardo, established the Harmolodic record label, which had a marketing and distribution arrangement with Verve/PolyGram. The label released its first album, Coleman's Tone Dialing, in September 1995. Harmolodic went on to release new albums by Coleman and Jayne Cortez, and also reissued some of Coleman's previous albums. The label was based in Harlem, New York.

=== Discography ===
Discography
Catalog number	Artist	Title	Year
5274832	Ornette Coleman and Prime Time	Tone Dialing	1995
5316572	Ornette Coleman	Sound Museum: Three Women	1996
5319142	Ornette Coleman	Sound Museum: Hidden Man	1996
5319162	Ornette Coleman	Body Meta (reissue)	1996
5319172	Ornette Coleman	Soapsuds, Soapsuds (reissue)	1996
5319182	Jayne Cortez	Taking the Blues Back Home	1996
5377892	Ornette Coleman and Joachim Kühn	Colors: Live from Leipzig	1997
5319152	Ornette Coleman	In All Languages (reissue)	1997

== See also ==
- Avant-funk
- List of record labels
