= Ornette Coleman =

American jazz musician and composer (1930–2015)

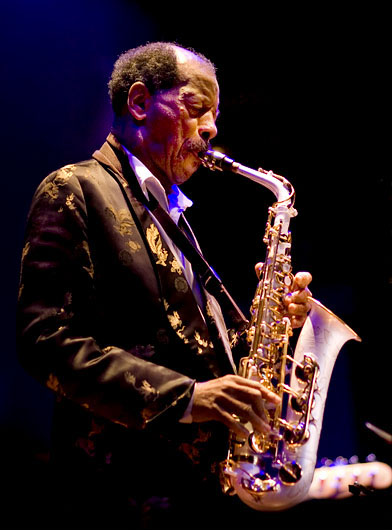
- Coleman at the Enjoy Jazz Festival in Heidelberg, Germany, 2008

Background information
- Born: Randolph Denard Ornette Coleman; March 9, 1930; Fort Worth, Texas, U.S.
- Died: June 11, 2015 (aged 85) New York City, U.S.
- Genres: Avant-garde jazz; free jazz; free funk; jazz fusion; third stream
- Occupations: Musician; composer
- Instruments: Alto saxophone; tenor saxophone; trumpet; violin
- Years active: 1940s–2015
- Labels: Atlantic; Blue Note; Verve
- Spouse: Jayne Cortez (m. 1954; div. 1964)

Randolph Denard Ornette Coleman (March 9, 1930 – June 11, 2015) was an American jazz saxophonist, trumpeter, violinist, and composer. He is best known as a principal founder of the free jazz genre, a term derived from his 1960 album Free Jazz: A Collective Improvisation. His pioneering works often abandoned the harmony-based composition, tonality, chord changes, and fixed rhythm found in earlier jazz idioms; instead, Coleman emphasized an experimental approach to improvisation rooted in ensemble playing and blues phrasing. Thom Jurek of AllMusic called him "one of the most beloved and polarizing figures in jazz history", noting that while "now celebrated as a fearless innovator and a genius, he was initially regarded by peers and critics as rebellious, disruptive, and even a fraud."

Born and raised in Fort Worth, Texas, Coleman taught himself to play the saxophone when he was a teenager. He began his musical career playing in local R&B and bebop groups and eventually formed his own jazz group in Los Angeles, featuring members such as Ed Blackwell, Don Cherry, Charlie Haden, and Billy Higgins. In November 1959, his quartet began a controversial residency at the Five Spot Café in New York City and he released the influential album The Shape of Jazz to Come on Atlantic Records. Coleman's subsequent Atlantic releases in the early 1960s would profoundly impact the direction of jazz in that decade, and his compositions "Lonely Woman" and "Broadway Blues" became standards cited as important early works in free jazz.

In the mid 1960s, Coleman left Atlantic for other labels, including Blue Note and Columbia, and began performing with his young son Denardo Coleman on drums. He explored symphonic composition with his 1972 album Skies of America, featuring the London Symphony Orchestra. In the mid-1970s, he formed the group Prime Time, which performed electric jazz-funk and elaborated on his theory of harmolodics. In 1995, he and Denardo founded the Harmolodic record label. Coleman's 2006 album Sound Grammar received the 2007 Pulitzer Prize for Music, making him the second jazz musician ever to receive the honor.

== Biography ==
=== Early life ===
Coleman was born Randolph Denard Ornette Coleman on March 9, 1930, in Fort Worth, Texas, where he was raised. He attended I.M. Terrell High School in Fort Worth, where he participated in the band program until he was dismissed for improvising during John Philip Sousa's march "The Washington Post". He began performing R&B and bebop on tenor saxophone, and formed The Jam Jivers with Prince Lasha and Charles Moffett.

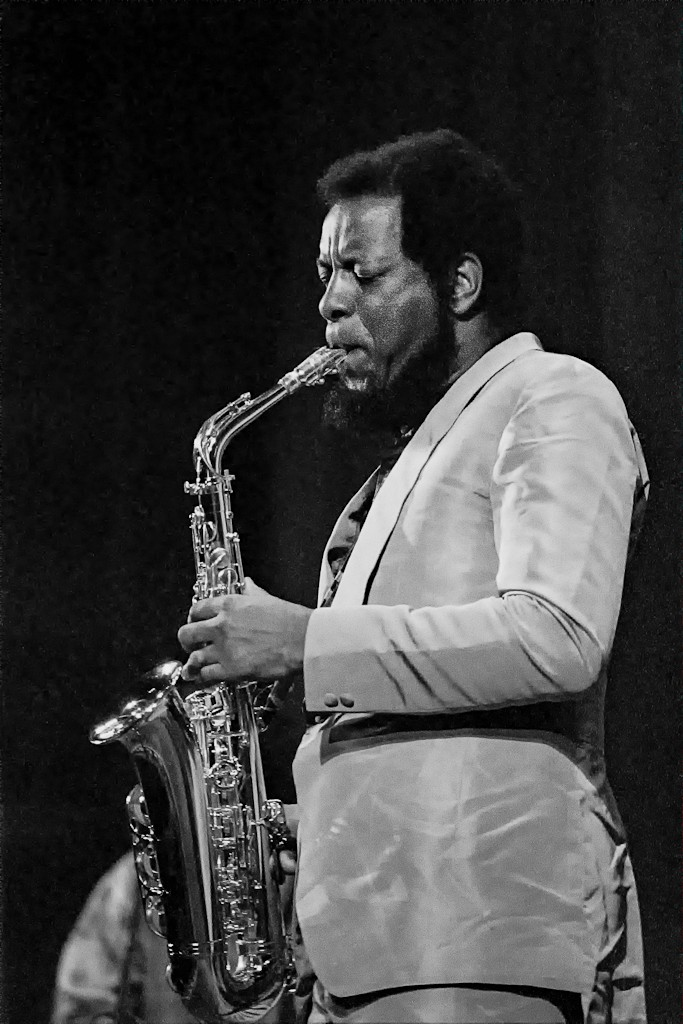
Coleman playing his signature alto saxophone in 1971

Eager to leave town, he accepted a job in 1949 with a Silas Green from New Orleans traveling show and then with touring rhythm and blues shows. After a show in Baton Rouge, Louisiana, he was assaulted and his saxophone was destroyed.

Coleman subsequently switched to alto saxophone, first playing it in New Orleans after the Baton Rouge incident; the alto would remain his primary instrument for the rest of his life. He then joined the band of Pee Wee Crayton and traveled with them to Los Angeles. He worked at various jobs in Los Angeles, including as an elevator operator, while pursuing his music career.

Coleman found like-minded musicians in Los Angeles, such as Ed Blackwell, Bobby Bradford, Don Cherry, Charlie Haden, Billy Higgins, and Charles Moffett. Thanks to the intercession of friends and a successful audition, Ornette signed his first recording contract with Los Angeles-based Contemporary Records, which allowed him to sell the tracks from his debut album, Something Else!!!! (1958), with Cherry, Higgins, Walter Norris, and Don Payne. During the same year, he briefly belonged to a quintet led by Paul Bley that performed at a club in Los Angeles. (That band is recorded on Live at the Hilcrest Club 1958.) By the time Tomorrow Is the Question! was recorded soon after with Cherry, bassists Percy Heath and Red Mitchell, and drummer Shelly Manne, the jazz world had been shaken up by Coleman's music. Some jazz musicians called him a fraud, while conductor and composer Leonard Bernstein praised him.

=== 1959: The Shape of Jazz to Come ===
In 1959, Atlantic Records released Coleman's third studio album, The Shape of Jazz to Come. According to music critic Steve Huey, the album "was a watershed event in the genesis of avant-garde jazz, profoundly steering its future course and throwing down a gauntlet that some still haven't come to grips with". Jazzwise magazine listed it at number three on their list of the 100 best jazz albums of all time in 2017.

Coleman's quartet received a long and sometimes controversial engagement at the Five Spot Café in Manhattan, New York City. Leonard Bernstein, Lionel Hampton, and the Modern Jazz Quartet were impressed and offered encouragement. Hampton asked to perform with the quartet, while Bernstein helped Haden obtain a Guggenheim Fellowship grant. A young Lou Reed followed Coleman's quartet around New York City. Among detractors, Miles Davis said that Coleman was "all screwed up inside", although he later became a proponent of Coleman's innovations; Dizzy Gillespie remarked of Coleman that "I don't know what he's playing, but it's not jazz."

Coleman's early sound was due in part to his use of a plastic Grafton saxophone, which he had purchased in Los Angeles in 1954 because he was unable to afford a metal saxophone at the time.

On his Atlantic recordings, Coleman's sidemen were Cherry on cornet or pocket trumpet; Charlie Haden, Scott LaFaro, and then Jimmy Garrison on bass; and Higgins or Ed Blackwell on drums. Coleman's complete recordings for the label were collected on the box set Beauty Is a Rare Thing in 1993.

=== 1960s: Free Jazz and Blue Note ===
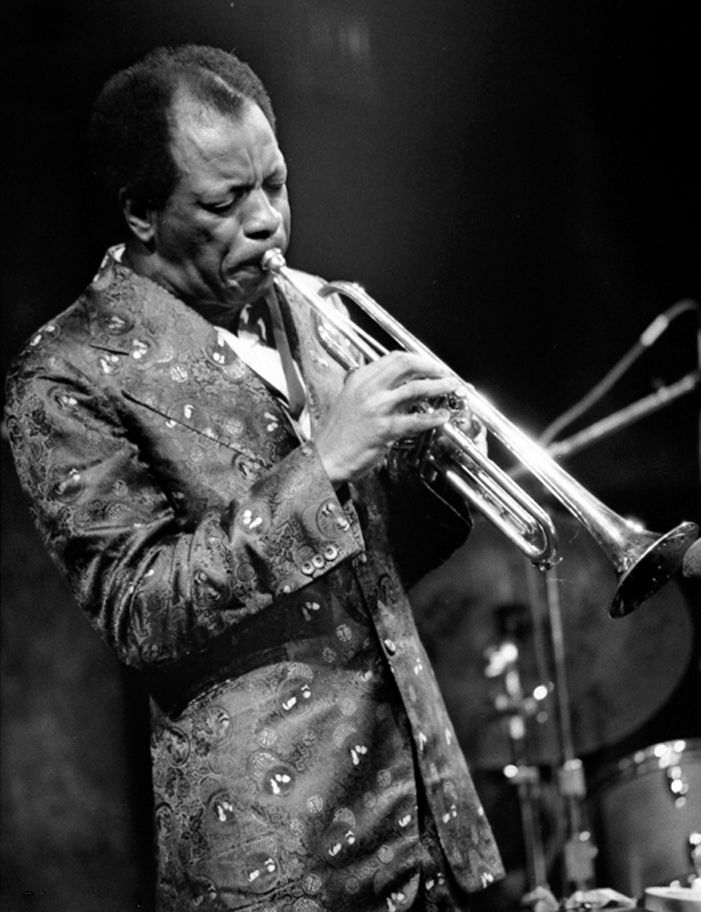
Coleman playing the trumpet at the Great American Music Hall, San Francisco, in 1981

In 1960, Coleman recorded Free Jazz: A Collective Improvisation, which featured a "double quartet" including Cherry and Freddie Hubbard on trumpet, Eric Dolphy on bass clarinet, Haden and LaFaro on bass, and Higgins and Blackwell on drums. The album was recorded in stereo, with one woodwind/trumpet/bass/drums quartet in each channel. Free Jazz was, at 37 minutes, the longest recorded continuous jazz performance at the time and was one of Coleman's most controversial albums. The January 18, 1962, issue of DownBeat magazine presented an article entitled "Double View of a Double Quartet" in which Pete Welding gave the album five stars while John A. Tynan rated it zero stars.

While Coleman had intended "free jazz" as simply an album title, free jazz was soon considered a new genre; Coleman expressed discomfort with the term.

After he left Atlantic, Coleman's music became more angular and engaged with the avant-garde jazz which had developed in part around his innovations. He formed a trio with bassist David Izenzon and drummer Charles Moffett and began playing trumpet and violin in addition to the saxophone. His friendship with free jazz saxophonist Albert Ayler influenced his unorthodox self-taught style on the trumpet and violin. Charlie Haden sometimes joined this trio to form a two-bass quartet. In 1966, Coleman signed with Blue Note Records and released the two-volume live album At the "Golden Circle" Stockholm featuring Izenzon and Moffett, recorded in Sweden the previous December. Later that year, he recorded The Empty Foxhole with Haden on bass and his ten year-old son Denardo Coleman on drums; Freddie Hubbard and Shelly Manne regarded Denardo's appearance on the album as an ill-advised publicity stunt. Denardo later became his father's primary drummer in the late 1970s.

Coleman formed another quartet with Haden, Garrison, and Elvin Jones, and Dewey Redman joined the group, usually on tenor saxophone. On February 29, 1968, Coleman's quartet (with Haden, Izenzon, and Ed Blackwell) performed live with Yoko Ono at the Royal Albert Hall, and a recording from their rehearsal was subsequently included on Ono's 1970 album Yoko Ono/Plastic Ono Band as the track "AOS".

He explored his interest in string textures on Town Hall, 1962, culminating in the 1972 album Skies of America with the London Symphony Orchestra.

=== 1970s–1990s: Harmolodic funk and Prime Time ===
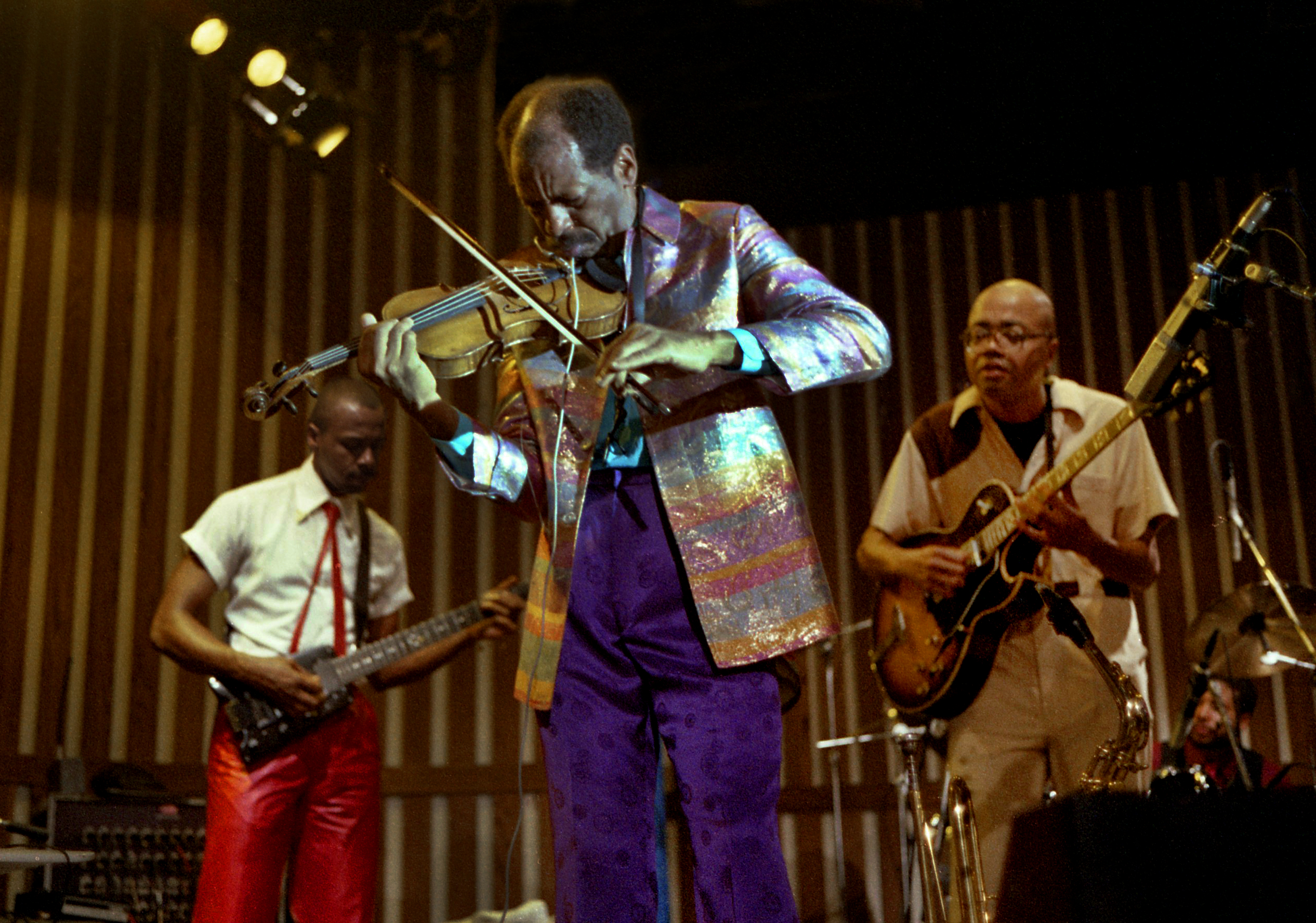
Coleman playing the violin with Prime Time in 1978, flanked by guitarists Charlie Ellerbee (left) and Bern Nix (right)

Coleman, like Miles Davis before him, soon took to playing with electric instruments and incorporating jazz fusion and jazz-funk influences. The 1976 album Dancing in Your Head, Coleman's first recording with the group which later became known as Prime Time, prominently featured bass guitarist Jamaaladeen Tacuma and electric guitarists Bern Nix and Charlie Ellerbee. While this marked a stylistic departure for Coleman, the music retained aspects of what he called harmolodics.

Coleman's subsequent albums with Prime Time, such as Virgin Beauty and Of Human Feelings, continued to use rock and funk rhythms in a style sometimes called free funk. Jerry Garcia of the Grateful Dead played guitar on three tracks on Virgin Beauty: "Three Wishes", "Singing in the Shower", and "Desert Players". Coleman later joined the Grateful Dead on stage at a 1993 performance in Oakland, California.

In December 1985, Coleman and guitarist Pat Metheny recorded Song X with Haden, Denardo Coleman, and second drummer Jack DeJohnette.

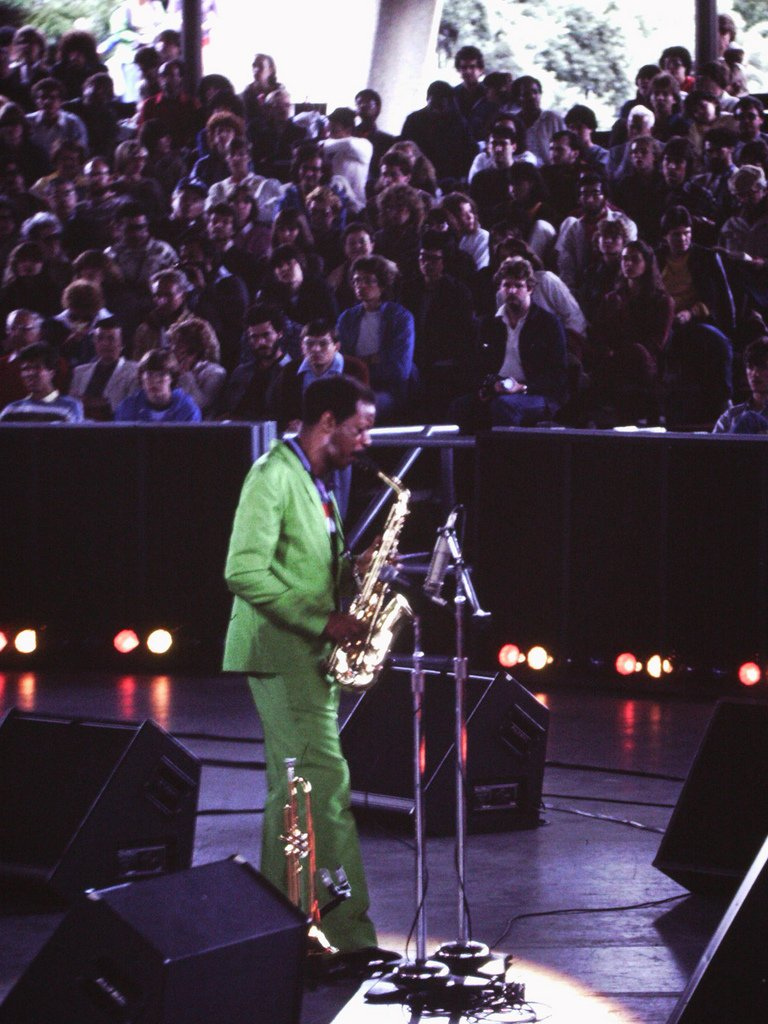
Coleman performing in Toronto in 1982

In 1990, Reggio Emilia, Italy, held a three-day "Portrait of the Artist" festival in Coleman's honor, in which he performed with Cherry, Haden, and Higgins. The festival also presented performances of his chamber music and Skies of America. In 1991, Coleman played on the soundtrack of David Cronenberg's film Naked Lunch; the orchestra was conducted by Howard Shore. Coleman released four records in 1995 and 1996, and for the first time in many years worked regularly with piano players (Geri Allen and Joachim Kühn).

=== 2000s ===
Two 1972 Coleman recordings, "Happy House" and "Foreigner in a Free Land", were used in Gus Van Sant's 2000 Finding Forrester.

In September 2006, Coleman released the album Sound Grammar. Recorded live in Ludwigshafen, Germany, in 2005, it was his first album of new material in ten years. It won the 2007 Pulitzer Prize for music, making Coleman only the second jazz musician (after Wynton Marsalis) to win the prize.

== Personal life ==
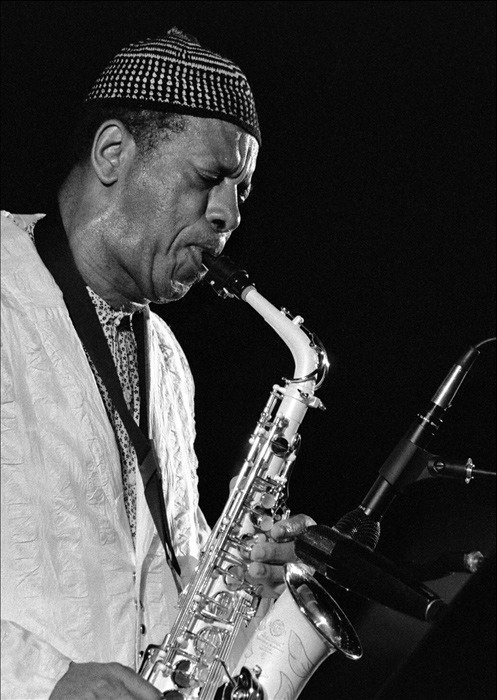
Coleman playing his Selmer alto saxophone in The Hague in 1994

Jazz pianist Joanne Brackeen stated in an interview with Marian McPartland that Coleman mentored her and gave her music lessons.

Coleman married poet Jayne Cortez in 1954. The couple divorced in 1964. They had one son, Denardo, born in 1956.

Coleman died of cardiac arrest in Manhattan on June 11, 2015, aged 85. His funeral was a three-hour event with performances and speeches by several of his collaborators and contemporaries, including Pharoah Sanders and Cecil Taylor.

== Awards and honors ==
- Guggenheim Fellowship, 1967 and 1974
- DownBeat Jazz Hall of Fame, 1969
- MacArthur Fellowship, 1994
- Praemium Imperiale, 2001
- Dorothy and Lillian Gish Prize, 2004
- Honorary doctorate of music, Berklee College of Music, 2006
- Grammy Lifetime Achievement Award, 2007
- Pulitzer Prize for music (for Sound Grammar), 2007
- Miles Davis Award, Montreal International Jazz Festival, 2009
- Honorary doctorate, CUNY Graduate Center, 2008
- Honorary doctorate of music, University of Michigan, 2010

== In popular culture ==
McClintic Sphere, a character in Thomas Pynchon's 1963 novel V., is modeled on Coleman and Thelonious Monk.
