= The Summer House Sessions =

Live album by Don Cherry
- Released: 2021
- Recorded: July 20, 1968
- Venues: Kummelnäs, Nacka, Sweden
- Genre: Free jazz
- Labels: Blank Forms Editions; BF-024

The Summer House Sessions is a live album by trumpeter Don Cherry. It was recorded in July 1968 at the summer home of musician and recording engineer Göran Frees in Kummelnäs, Nacka, Sweden, after Frees invited Cherry to visit for a series of jam sessions and rehearsals. (Frees would later record Cherry's Organic Music Society (1972) and Eternal Now (1974).)

On the album, which was released on LP and CD in 2021 by Blank Forms Editions with cover art by Cherry's wife Moki, Cherry blended members of two of his ensembles. From the Swedish band that recorded the album Live in Stockholm appear saxophonists Bernt Rosengren and Tommy Koverhult, bassist Torbjörn Hultcrantz, and drummer Leif Wennerström, while from Cherry's international group New York Total Music Company appear bassist Kent Carter and drummer Jacques Thollot. Hand drummer Bülent Ateş, who was visiting from Turkey, also participated. The CD release includes a second disc that features several additional musicians. Recordings from the session were presumed lost, but were located in the vaults of the Center for Swedish Folk Music and Jazz Research.

The music heard on The Summer House Sessions extends the "international" approach begun on Cherry's three Blue Note albums, Complete Communion, Symphony for Improvisers and Where Is Brooklyn?, "obliterating the borders of genre and enthusiastically mixing musical traditions from Asia, Africa and Latin America."

The album was issued as part of a larger 2021 retrospective of the Cherrys' collaborative work, which also involved two exhibits: Organic Music Societies: Don and Moki Cherry, presented in Brooklyn by Blank Forms, and Moki Cherry, Communicate, How?: Tapestries and Paintings, 1967-1980, sponsored by the Corbett vs. Dempsey Gallery in Chicago. In addition, Blank Forms published a 496-page book titled Organic Music Societies, featuring essays, interviews, and other writings, as well as reproductions of Moki's art, and released a second album titled Organic Music Theatre: Festival de jazz de Chateauvallon 1972.

== Reception ==
Professional ratings
Review scores
Source	Rating
Jazz Journal	3.5/5 stars
Tom Hull – on the Web	B+

In a review for Jazz Journal, Elliot Marlow-Stevens wrote: "Capturing brilliant and organic improvisation, The Summer House Sessions offers a fascinating glimpse into Cherry's world of musical research and experimentation."

Giovanni Russonello, writing for The New York Times, stated: "The horn players all trade themes and motifs in a star burst of high-velocity improvising, sometimes coming together into cohesive, beboppish lines, like an ornate assemblage being thrown together on the roof of a fast-moving car."

In an article for Point of Departure, Gabriel Bristow noted the album's "exhilarating energy," and commented that it "sounds like summer. Something about the way it was recorded makes the music sounds like sunlight bouncing off rippling water." He remarked: "Ultimately this is a record of people at play. A serious experiment in the everyday art of living musically that was Cherry's life."

Stef Gijssels, writing for The Free Jazz Collective, commented: "The music demonstrates Cherry's aspiration for a universal language through music, incorporating many ideas and rhythms, all integrated in one joyous and communal interaction."

In a review for Aquarium Drunkard, Tyler Wilcox wrote: "It's wild and occasionally dense stuff, but the primary feeling that comes across is childlike wonder, a joyful innocence that saturates every moment."

Jennifer Kelly, in an article for Dusted Magazine, praised the album's "warmth and immediacy," and noted: "there's a wonderful sense of play and cross cultural collaboration in these cuts." She asked: "How far along were other jazz musicians at this point in bringing in African and middle eastern instruments?"

In an essay for The Quietus, Dustin Krcatovich stated that the most radical aspect of the recording is "the insistence that the music be communal and solo-free. Don and Moki would generally demur at the notion that their work might be considered 'political', but the rejection of leaders is an inherently political act no matter how one chooses to frame it."

== CD Track listing ==
=== Disc 1 ===
Summer House Sessions – 46:45

1. "Human" (Don Cherry)
2. "The Machine Age" (Don Cherry)
3. "Sir Charles Brackeen 'A'" (Charles Brackeen)
4. "9/8 For T, Part I" (Traditional Turkish Folk Song)
5. "9/8 For T, Part II" (Traditional Turkish Folk Song)
6. "Mao" (Don Cherry)
7. "Santuário Do Morro" (Adylson Godoy)
8. "Samba" (Jacques Thollot)
9. "Theme" (Ornette Coleman)
10. "Sir Charles Brackeen 'B'" (Charles Brackeen)
11. "Sir Charles Brackeen 'C'" (Charles Brackeen)
12. "Plötsligt" (Don Cherry)
13. "Om Igen" (Don Cherry)

=== Disc 2 ===
1. "Untitled Summer House Session 1" – 9:36
2. "Untitled Summer House Session 2" – 17:25
3. "Untitled Summer House Session 3" – 8:55
4. "Untitled Summer House Session 4" – 5:46

== Personnel ==
- Don Cherry – trumpet, percussion, flute
- Bernt Rosengren – tenor saxophone, clarinet flute
- Tommy Koverhult – tenor saxophone, flute
- Gunnar Lindqvist – reeds, flute (Disc 2)
- Torbjörn Hultcrantz – bass
- Kent Carter – bass
- Bülent Ateş – hand drum, drums
- Leif Wennerström – drums
- Jacques Thollot – drums
- Gino Sippio – bongos (Disc 2)
- Sune Spångberg – bongos, drums (Disc 2)
