= Live at Cafe Montmartre 1966 =

Live album by Don Cherry
- Released: 2007, 2008, and 2009
- Recorded: March 1966
- Venue: Cafe Montmartre, Copenhagen, Denmark
- Genre: Free jazz
- Label: ESP-Disk; ESP 4032; ESP 4043; ESP 4051

Live at Cafe Montmartre 1966, Volumes 1, 2, and 3, is a trio of live albums by trumpeter Don Cherry. The albums were recorded in March 1966 at the Cafe Montmartre in Copenhagen, Denmark, and were released by ESP-Disk in 2007 (Volume 1), 2008 (Volume 2), and 2009 (Volume 3). On the recordings, Cherry is joined by saxophonist Gato Barbieri, vibraphonist Karl Berger, bassist Bo Stief, and drummer Aldo Romano. Volume 1 is accompanied by a bonus DVD sampler featuring a variety of the label's artists.

Barbieri, Berger, Romano, and bassist Jean-François Jenny-Clark were members of Cherry's first quintet, founded in Paris in 1964. Berger recalled: "For the first time in my experience there was a kind of music with absolutely no problems; there was no need to talk about style... since we spoke different languages, it was hardly possible to communicate verbally... Everything we later played evolved collectively." In early 1965, they recorded the live album Togetherness, later reissued as Gato Barbieri & Don Cherry. At the end of that year, Cherry and Barbieri traveled to New York, where they recorded Complete Communion with bassist Henry Grimes and drummer Ed Blackwell. Cherry and Barbieri then returned to Europe, where they reunited with the other members of the group. Live at Cafe Montmartre 1966 was recorded during a month-long engagement at Copenhagen's Cafe Montmartre, with house bassist Bo Stief substituting for Jenny-Clark, who was unavailable.

All three volumes feature performances of Cherry's composition "Complete Communion", previously recorded on the album of the same name. The tracks titled "Free Improvisation: Music Now" and "Remembrance" contain some themes that would be incorporated into Cherry's 1967 album Symphony for Improvisers, recorded in September 1966.

== Reception ==
Professional ratings
Review scores
Source	Rating
AllMusic: Volume 1	4/5 stars
AllMusic: Volume 2	4.5/5 stars
The Penguin Guide to Jazz: Volume 1	3.5/4 stars
The Penguin Guide to Jazz: Volume 2	4/4 stars
DownBeat: Volume 2	4.5/5 stars
All About Jazz: Volume 1	3.5/5 stars
All About Jazz: Volume 2	4.5/5 stars
All About Jazz: Volume 2	3.5/5 stars

In a review of Volume 1 for AllMusic, Ken Dryden wrote: "Although there are plenty of wild moments, much of the music proves rather accessible to those not usually enamored with avant-garde jazz." Arwulf arwulf, reviewing Volume 2, stated: "This joyously free yet well organized modern music is to some extent an outgrowth of Cherry's early experiences with Ornette Coleman but is much more directly inspired by the imaginative principles and grandly expressive behavior of Albert Ayler... Live at Cafe Montmartre 1966, Vol. 2 qualifies as essential listening for all who love and revere the legacies of Albert Ayler and his good friend Don Cherry."

The authors of the Penguin Guide to Jazz Recordings called Volume 1 "a valuable documentation of how the touring group sounded after Complete Communion," and noted that "it's Barbieri who steals the honours."

Chris Kelsey of Jazz Times commented: "this is proof enough that by 1966 free-jazz was certainly a worldwide phenomenon... The playing is consistently exquisite, with Cherry in top form and Barbieri reminding us just how burning a free player he once was. This is music that matters, and is highly recommended."

Writing for All About Jazz, Clifford Allen remarked: "this music is but one snapshot of a continually evolving group music, and one which did not end after the dissolution of this quintet. Cherry's music affirms unity among cultures and their art, and gets to the heart of music's ability to communicate the most basic of human feelings." In a separate review for AAJ, Jeff Stockton called the album "just one marvelous, essential stop in the musical journey of this one-of-a-kind jazz griot," and noted that "the band is tight and well-rehearsed." AAJ's Henry Smith stated: "The unit plays with the rare ease afforded them by their lengthy booking, making the album one of great importance in Cherry's catalog. That the recordings sound as lively today as they did when they were made is testament to the strength of Cherry's musical character and his accomplices' sympathetic musicianship." Jerry D'Souza noted: "Cherry was an adventurer and his band serves him well... It has been over 40 years since the performance and it has not lost its impact.

== Track listings ==
Composed by Don Cherry.

=== Volume 1 ===
1. "Intro" – 0:35
2. "Cocktail Piece" – 13:11
3. "Neopolitan Suite: Dios E Diablo" – 7:26
4. "Complete Communion" – 13:20
5. "Free Improvisation: Music Now" – 10:46
6. "Cocktail Piece (End)" – 2:28

=== Volume 2 ===
1. "Intro" – 0:23
2. "Orfeu Negro" – 10:41
3. "Suite for Albert Ayler" – 11:13
4. "Spring is Here" – 8:48
5. "Remembrance" – 9:27
6. "Elephantasy (Incomplete)" – 2:42
7. "Complete Communion" – 22:29

=== Volume 3 ===
1. "Complete Communion" – 26:11
2. "Remembrance" – 24:46

== Personnel ==
- Don Cherry – trumpet
- Gato Barbieri – tenor saxophone
- Karl Berger – vibraphone
- Bo Stief – bass
- Aldo Romano – drums
