= Home Boy (Sister Out) =

Studio album by Don Cherry
- Released: 1985
- Recorded: May – June 1985
- Studio: Studio Caroline, Paris
- Genre: Jazz, R&B, reggae
- Label: Barclay

Don Cherry chronology
El Corazón (1982)	Home Boy (Sister Out) (1985)	Art Deco (1988)

Home Boy (Sister Out) is an album by jazz trumpeter Don Cherry released on the Barclay label in 1985. The album was re-issued, by We Want Sounds, in June 2018.

== Background ==
In 2018, We Want Sounds described the album:

Recorded at Studio Caroline, a hotbed for the African diaspora in Paris during the 80s, and produced by French-Chilean musician and producer Ramuntcho Matta (his father is Chilean painter Roberto Matta and half-brother is cult New York artist Gordon Matta-Clark), Home Boy, Sister Out is one of Don Cherry's most original albums.

Matta is one of the true architects of that 1980s Paris sound mixing music from all over the Planet with the street vibe of the French capital. He had spent his formative years in Paris and then switched to New York, where he lived between 1978 and 1980, interacting with the cream of the Downtown scene, including Laurie Anderson, Meredith Monk, Peter Gordon, Arto Lindsay, The Talking Heads and many more. Returning to France, Matta started delving into Paris' hip underground scene led by Actuel Magazine, working and going out with Elli Medeiros, which led to a chance meeting with Don Cherry, and to recording Home Boy in Spring 1985.

== Reception ==
Professional ratings
Review scores
Source	Rating
Pitchfork	6/10 stars
Tom Hull – on the Web	B+

In a review for Pitchfork, Daniel Martin-McCormick wrote: "For all its flaws, Home Boy is a grower. Cherry’s magnetism remains, despite the chintzy production and slapdash approach."

Writing for Bandcamp Daily, Dean Van Nguyen called the album "a lost record from an oft undervalued time in the musician's life that nonetheless offers a vital document for anyone trying to fully map Cherry's pluralistic, technicolor world."

== Track listing ==
All compositions by Don Cherry except as indicated

1. Butterfly Friend (3:45) (lyrics by Moki Cherry)
2. I Walk (3:12) (music and lyrics by Ramuntcho Matta)
3. Rappin Recipe (6:48)
4. Reggae To The High Tower (4:11)
5. Art Deco (2:53)
6. Call Me (4:36) (lyrics by Elli Medeiros)
7. Treat Your Lady Right (6:09)
8. Alphabet City (3:43)
9. Bamako Love (5:41)

== Personnel ==
- Don Cherry – pocket trumpet, vocals, Doussn'Gouni, piano, synthesizer, melodica
- Ramuntcho Matta – guitar
- Jannick Top – bass
- Negrito Trasante – bongos, congas, talking drum, rhythm box
- Polo Lombardo – konks
- Claude Salmieri – drums
- Fil Mong – bass
- Jean-Pierre Coco – congas
- Abdoulaye Prosper Niang – drums
- Elli Medeiros – backing vocals
