= Cherry Jam =

EP by Don Cherry
- Released: 2020
- Recorded: October 1965
- Studio: Copenhagen
- Genre: Jazz
- Labels: Gearbox Records; GB1559RSD

Cherry Jam is a four-track extended play by trumpeter Don Cherry. It was recorded in October 1965 in Copenhagen for radio broadcast by Danmarks Radio, and was released by Gearbox Records as part of Record Store Day 2020. On the album, Cherry is joined by four local musicians: saxophonist Mogens Bollerup, pianist Atli Bjørn, bassist Benny Nielsen, and drummer Simon Koppel. Cherry Jam helps to document the gap between Togetherness, recorded in the spring and summer of 1965 and released in 1966, and Complete Communion, recorded in December 1965 and released in 1966, and shows him in the midst of a transition from a sideman in the free jazz scene to a leader of his own bands.

== Reception ==
Professional ratings
Review scores
Source	Rating
All About Jazz	4/5 stars
Jazzwise	4/5 stars
Jazz Journal	4.5/5 stars
Tom Hull – on the Web	B+

In a review for All About Jazz, Karl Ackermann wrote: "The Danes on the session are a fine rhythm section able to implement Cherry's peculiar blend of avant-garde, free jazz and hard bop. As he moved further into a more erudite phase with Blue Note, Cherry's direction was tipped off here in sophisticated spectacles of sounds and rhythm; sharp, powerful and direct. Cherry Jam is brief at less than thirty-five minutes, but it concentrates a lot of energy and fun into that time."

Olie Brice of London Jazz News called the album "basically a hard bop album with a pick-up band," but noted: "It is valuable to have three more Cherry compositions, none of them recorded elsewhere to my knowledge."

Jazz Journal's Derek Ansell commented: "Cherry is on top form throughout the limited time scale and had surrounded himself with a top-notch front line partner and rhythm section... This welcome release shows him at his inventive best in the free style music he was playing currently."

Writing for Magnet, Bill Meyer remarked: "while the music on Cherry Jam isn't going to burnish anyone's avant-garde credentials, on its own terms, it's quite delightful. The trumpeter didn't get around as much as he did by being a prima donna, and Cherry gamely meets the performers where they're at... While the brief session sat on a shelf for decades, it sounds splendid."

The New York City Jazz Record's Pierre Crépon wrote: "Cherry Jam may ultimately be valuable more for what it is not than what it is, showing how the form of Cherry's music needed the radical evolution it would soon undergo truly to take flight. Cherry's '60s work deserves the most complete and qualitative documentation possible, just what Gearbox Records has helped accomplish."

In an article for Maximum Volume Music, Donnie Kemp stated: "If you have never heard Don Cherry before then this EP may well be a decent place to start. It demonstrates his burgeoning leadership qualities and talent which would become his trademark in the years following."

Stef Gijssels, writing for The Free Jazz Collective, commented: "It is clear that the Danish band is very strongly rooted in traditional jazz, and as a result there is not much excitement to be had musically. The album brings a few new and never released Cherry compositions, which will make it interesting to fans."

Edwin Pouncey of Jazzwise stated: "As an audio snapshot of Cherry's early European years as a musician and bandleader, Cherry Jam... will agreeably suffice."

== Track listing ==
1. "The Ambassador From Greenland" (Don Cherry) – 5:33
2. "You Took Advantage of Me" (Richard Rodgers) – 5:16
3. "Priceless" (Don Cherry) – 6:47
4. "Nigeria" (Alvin Batiste, Don Cherry) – 4:48

== Personnel ==
- Don Cherry – cornet
- Mogens Bollerup – tenor saxophone
- Atli Bjørn – piano
- Benny Nielsen – bass
- Simon Koppel – drums
