= Actions (album) =

Live album by Krzysztof Penderecki and Don Cherry
- Released: 1971
- Recorded: October 17, 1971
- Venues: Donaueschingen Festival, Donaueschingen, Germany
- Genre: Free jazz
- Labels: Philips; 6305 153
- Producer: Joachim-Ernst Berendt

Actions is a live album featuring debut performances of works by composer Krzysztof Penderecki and trumpeter and composer Don Cherry. It was recorded on October 17, 1971, at the Donaueschingen Festival in Donaueschingen, Germany, and was released on LP later that year by Philips. The music was performed by an ensemble called The New Eternal Rhythm Orchestra, composed of top European improvisors. In 1998, the album was reissued on CD by Transparency Records. It was remastered and reissued again in 2001 by Intuition Records.

According to Cherry, the title of "Humus - The Life Exploring Force" refers to "the fundament of life, the earth which we are ravaging every day, the very substance of life." The piece employs Balinese, African, and Indian material, and uses seven themes, none of which were notated for the performance. "Sita Rama Encores" features Cherry interacting with the audience, as he teaches them the sixteen-beat Hindustani teental pattern.

Penderecki composed "Actions for Free Jazz Orchestra" after hearing a performance by the Globe Unity Orchestra. The performance heard on the album marked the composer's debut as a conductor. In interviews following the performance of "Actions," some of the players commented that, because Penderecki had notated pitches and rhythms, they missed their usual freedom to improvise. The composer, however, noted that he attempted to maintain the flavor of jazz, and stated that if he had granted more freedom to the players, it would not have been his piece.

In 2018, saxophonist Mats Gustafsson and his Fire! Orchestra were commissioned to revive "Actions" for the Sacrum Profanum Festival in Kraków, Poland. A recording of the group's performance of an expanded version of the composition was released on CD by Rune Grammofon in 2020.

== Reception ==
Professional ratings
Review scores
Source	Rating
AllMusic	3/5 stars
The Penguin Guide to Jazz	2/4 stars
The Virgin Encyclopedia of Jazz	3/5 stars

In a review for AllMusic, Brian Olewnick wrote: "The orchestra is truly an all-star cast of the cream of European improvisers, each and every one having gone on to significant achievements." He compared "Humus" to Cherry's Eternal Rhythm and Relativity Suite, and praised its "enthusiasm and joy," but noted that Penderecki's "Actions" "doesn't quite hold together as a solid work," although he notes that it is "of some degree of historical import." He concluded: "Fans of Cherry... will definitely want to own this disc as a significant addition to his stellar work of the late '60s and early '70s."

The authors of the Penguin Guide to Jazz Recordings described the album as "a confrontation between free jazz and the new music," and stated that the collaboration "hasn't aged well."

Writing for the BBC, Ian R. Watson commented: "the combustible influences that shaped both pieces are still relevant today and find echoes in the work of Butch Morris and myriad others... this is still damn fine music of any stripe that can be enjoyed without any prior knowledge of its participants whatsoever."

Phil Freeman, writing for Burning Ambulance, called "Actions" one of the "essential documents of large scale avant-jazz," praising its "swinging ensemble passages interspersed with frequently raucous but sometimes quite beautiful solo and duo sections."

== Track listing ==
1. "Humus - The Life Exploring Force" (Don Cherry) – 18:58
2. "Sita Rama Encores" (Traditional, arranged by Don Cherry) – 6:36
3. "Actions for Free Jazz Orchestra" (Krzysztof Penderecki) – 16:30

== Personnel ==
- Don Cherry – trumpet, flute, vocals (track 1)
- Gunter Hampel – flute, bass clarinet
- Peter Brötzmann – tenor saxophone, baritone saxophone
- Willem Breuker – tenor saxophone, clarinet
- Gerd Dudek – tenor saxophone, soprano saxophone
- Kenny Wheeler – trumpet, cornet
- Manfred Schoof – trumpet, cornet
- Tomasz Stańko – trumpet, cornet
- Albert Mangelsdorff – trombone
- Paul Rutherford – trombone
- Terje Rypdal – guitar
- Fred Van Hove – organ, piano
- Buschi Niebergall – bass
- Peter Warren – bass, electric bass
- Han Bennink – drums, percussion, tabla, kalimba
- Mocqui Cherry – tambura (track 1)
- Loes MacGillycutty – vocals (track 1)
- Krzysztof Penderecki – conductor (track 3)
