= Blue Lake (album) =

Live album by Don Cherry
- Released: 1974
- Recorded: April 22, 1971
- Genre: Jazz
- Length: 63:33
- Label: BYG

Don Cherry chronology
Orient (1971)	Blue Lake (1974)	Organic Music Society (1972)

Blue Lake is a live album by jazz/world musician Don Cherry recorded in 1971 and first released on the BYG label in Japan in 1974. In 2003, Charly Records reissued the album along with Orient on the compilation Orient / Blue Lake.

== Reception ==
Professional ratings
Review scores
Source	Rating
AllMusic	4/5 stars
Tom Hull – on the Web	B+

In the AllMusic review by Rob Ferrier, he states "Don Cherry is one of music's great adventurers. Always ready to stretch himself, he has seemed more concerned with growing as an artist and expanding his horizons than with getting a big paycheck. This live set, Blue Lake, is a worthy introduction to his solo work".

The authors of The Penguin Guide to Jazz Recordings wrote: "'Dollar and Okay's Tunes' is a wonderful example of group improvisation. Dyani's sweeping, thunderous bass and Cherry's singing to himself while at the piano lend the set curious echoes of all sorts of modern jazz precedents, but it's a unique sound all the same."

== Track listing ==
All compositions by Don Cherry except as indicated

1. "Blue Lake" – 4:55
2. "Dollar and Okay's Tunes" (Dollar Brand, Okay Tamiz) – 31:51
3. "East: – 26:42
  - Recorded live in Paris, France, on April 22, 1971

== Personnel ==
- Don Cherry – pocket trumpet, conch shell, piano, celesta, flute, percussion, vocals
- Johnny Dyani – double bass, percussion, voice
- Okay Temiz – drums, percussion
