= Hear & Now (Don Cherry album) =

Studio album by Don Cherry
- Released: 1977
- Recorded: December 1976
- Genre: Jazz
- Length: 45:00
- Label: Atlantic
- Producer: Narada Michael Walden

Don Cherry chronology
Brown Rice (1975)	Hear & Now (1977)	Codona (1978)

Hear & Now is an album by trumpeter Don Cherry, recorded in 1976 and released on the Atlantic label.

== Reception ==
Professional ratings
Review scores
Source	Rating
All About Jazz	2/5 stars
AllMusic	2.5/5 stars
The Rolling Stone Jazz Record Guide	2/5 stars

The AllMusic review by Andrew Hamilton stated: "An average collection from Cherry, respectable and inoffensive".

In a review for All About Jazz, Chris May warned: "if you only acquire one Don Cherry album in your life, don't acquire this one," and commented: "There are some great musicians on the album... but it's not enough to lift the proceedings."

Phil Johnson, writing for The Independent, stated: "It's all over the place stylistically, from Indian mysticism to heavy metal, played by bizarre bands... And yet at least a couple of the tracks... are amazing, presaging Bill Laswell's funky world-fusion."

== Track listing ==
All compositions by Don Cherry except as indicated

1. "Mahakali" – 9:50
2. "Universal Mother" (Sherab-Barry Bryant, Cherry) – 6:46
3. "Karmapa Chenno" – 7:14
4. "California" – 2:51
5. "Buddha's Blues" – 3:40
6. "Eagle Eye" – 0:55
7. "Surrender Rose" (Narada Michael Walden) – 3:32
8. "Journey of Milarepa/Shanti/The Ending Movement-Liberation [from Welkin of Infinity]" (Cherry/Cherry/Stan Samole) – 10:12

- Recorded at Electric Lady Studios in New York in December 1976.

== Personnel ==
- Don Cherry – trumpet, bells, conch, flute, vocals
- Michael Brecker – saxophone
- Collin Walcott – sitar
- Moki Cherry – tamboura
- Ronald Dean Miller, Stan Samole – guitar
- Lois Colin – harp
- Cliff Carter – keyboards
- Narada Michael Walden – piano, timpani, tom tom
- Marcus Miller, Neil Jason – bass
- Sammy Figueroa – congas
- Tony Williams, Lenny White, Steve Jordan – drums
- Raphael Cruz – percussion
- Cheryl Alexander – vocals
- Patty Scialfa – vocals
