= Live at the Kerava Jazz Festival =

Live album by Henry Grimes
- Released: 2005
- Recorded: June 5, 2004
- Venue: The Kerava Jazz Festival, Keuda House, Kerava, Finland
- Genre: Jazz
- Length: 1:03:34
- Label: Ayler Records aylCD-028
- Producer: Mauno Kahranaho

Live at the Kerava Jazz Festival is a live album by bassist Henry Grimes. It was recorded in June 2004 at the Kerava Jazz Festival in Kerava, Finland and was released by Ayler Records in 2005. On the album, Grimes is joined by saxophonist David Murray and drummer Hamid Drake. The album was Grimes's first recording as a leader since his 1966 debut The Call.

== Reception ==
Professional ratings
Review scores
Source	Rating
The Penguin Guide to Jazz	3/4 stars

The authors of The Penguin Guide to Jazz awarded the album 3 stars, and stated: "This live date from Finland suggests that 30 years of inactivity haven't done his chops any serious harm. His solo on the opening 'Spin' has the same rumbling power he always conjured... The cover painting by Åke Bjurhamn shows a mysterious sunlit ship sailing placidly on deep, dark water; we can think of no better visual analogy to this story and this music."

Writing for All About Jazz, Andrey Henkin commented: "The album is one of those rare intergenerational events that allow listeners to trace a direct lineage through jazz. Grimes' work from the '60s no doubt influenced Murray and Drake, the Coltrane and Cyrille of their generation. To hear the trio come together is fascinating, if only to hear how Grimes is inspired by those he himself inspired." In a separate review for the same publication, Rex Butters wrote: "Murray and Drake share with Grimes an approach that incorporates virtuosity and daunting technical skill to create an active onslaught of ideas... There's going to be a tendency to underestimate Grimes' achievement here, which is akin to a star major league hitter dropping out for thirty years to return more poised with the same power against younger pitchers. For fans unable to catch the man in action, Live at the Kerava Jazz Festival holds the proof that this jazz Orpheus has returned from the underworld a greater light."

Critic Tom Hull remarked: "The sound doesn't favor the return of Ayler's long-lost bassist, but David Murray and Hamid Drake do."

== Track listing ==
1. "Spin" (Grimes) - 22:21
2. "Eighty Degrees" (Drake) - 25:49
3. "Flowers For Albert" (Murray) - 7:48
4. "Blues For Savannah" (Grimes) - 7:34

== Personnel ==
- David Murray – tenor saxophone, bass clarinet
- Henry Grimes – bass
- Hamid Drake – drums
