= Orient (album) =

Live album by Don Cherry
- Released: 1974
- Recorded: April 22 and August 11, 1971
- Genre: Avant-garde jazz, world music
- Length: 70:41
- Label: BYG

Don Cherry chronology
Eternal Now (1974)	Orient (1974)	Brown Rice (1975)

Orient is a live album by jazz/world music musician Don Cherry recorded in 1971 and released on the BYG label in Japan in 1974, originally untitled. When reissued in the UK by Affinity Records in 1980, it was issued with the title "Orient." Later reissues have continued to use the same title. In 2003, Charly Records reissued the album along with Blue Lake on the compilation Orient / Blue Lake.

== Reception ==
Professional ratings
Review scores
Source	Rating
AllMusic	4.5/5 stars

In his review for AllMusic, Brian Olewnick says, "While not quite up to the caliber of Eternal Rhythm or the Mu sessions with Ed Blackwell, Orient is nonetheless a valuable document and recommended".

The authors of The Penguin Guide to Jazz Recordings wrote: "The language is expansive and indefinable, with elements of as many folk traditions as you can name and both long tracks sustain attention and renewed attention amazingly well."

A reviewer for All About Jazz commented: "The ever-evolving Cherry was a true music master whose example was an anomaly for record labels and music stores. It can never be stressed enough that Cherry, to borrow Ellington's catch phrase, was most definitely 'beyond category,' making the world a much smaller place."

== Track listing ==
All compositions by Don Cherry

1. "Orient Parts 1 & 2" – 25:25
2. "Si Ta Ra Ma" – 19:18
3. "Eagle Eye Part 1 & 2" – 13:24
4. "Togetherness" – 11:41

- Recorded live in Carpentras, France on August 11, 1971 (tracks 1&2) and Paris, France on April 22, 1971 (tracks 3&4)

== Personnel ==
- Don Cherry – pocket trumpet, piano, flute, vocals
- Johnny Dyani – bass (tracks 3 & 4)
- Okay Temiz – drums, percussion (tracks 3 & 4)
- Han Bennink – drums, percussion, vocals, accordion (tracks 1 & 2)
- Mocqui Cherry – tambura (tracks 1 & 2)
