= Okay Temiz =

Turkish musician (born 1939)

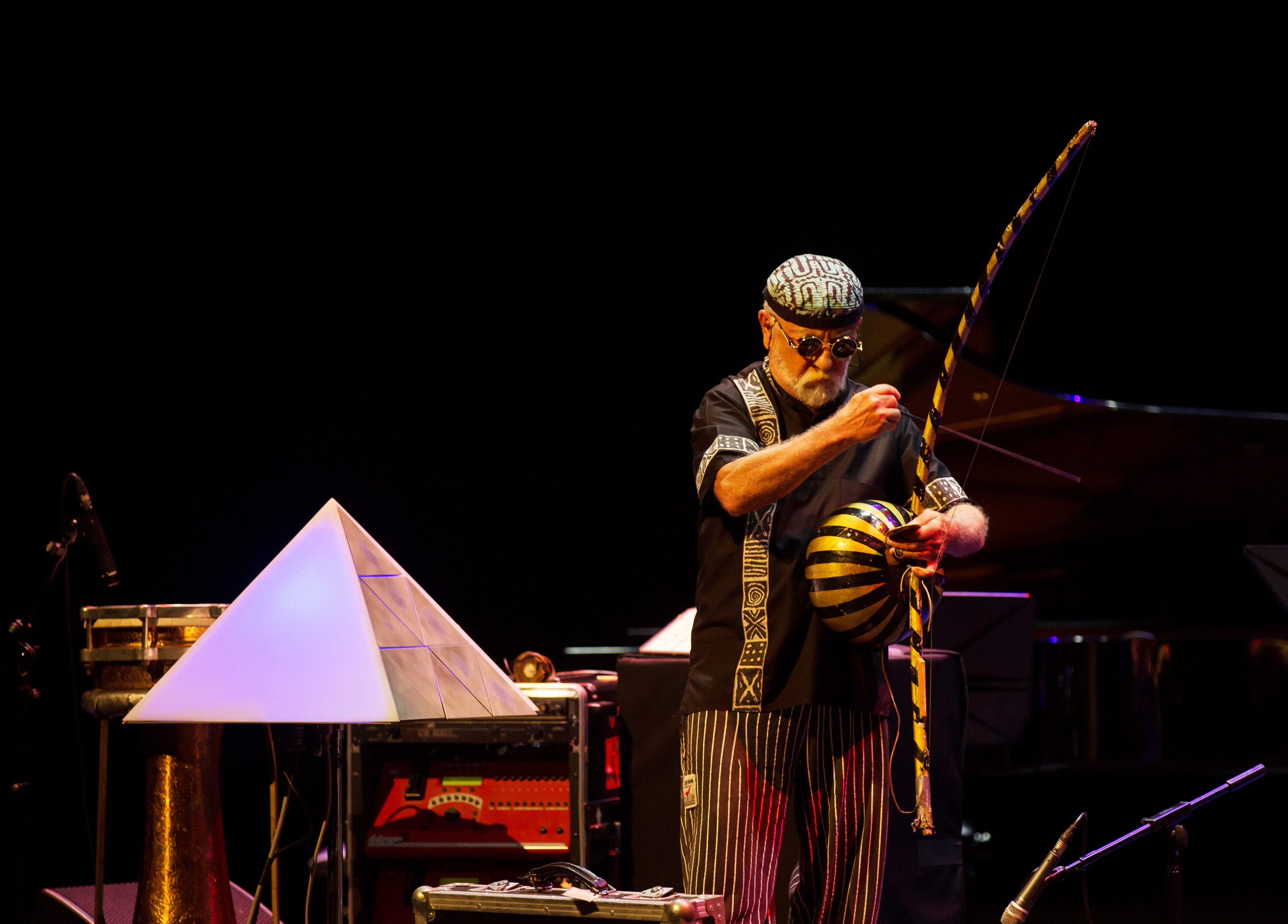
Okay Temiz

Okay Temiz (born 11 February 1939, Istanbul, Turkey) is a Turkish fusion jazz percussionist and drummer.

== Biography ==
Temiz was influenced by his mother, Naciye, who was classically trained in music. Temiz, who began playing professionally in 1955, studied at the Ankara Conservatory and at the Tophane Art Institute. After meeting Maffy Falay and Don Cherry, he settled in Sweden. With Cherry and bassist Johnny Dyani he toured America and Europe in 1971. In 1972, he founded the band Xaba with Dyani and trumpeter Mongezi Feza.

His drums are of his own invention, and are made of hand-beaten copper, after Turkish debuka's.

== Discography ==
- Don Cherry: Orient (BYG, 1971)
- Maffy Falay & Sevda: Maffy Falay and Sevda (1972) (Caprice RIKS LP 31)
- Maffy Falay & Sevda: Live at Jazzhus Montmartre (1972) (Caprice 1041)
- Don Cherry: Organic Music Society (Caprice, 1972)
- Johnny Dyani/Okay Temiz/Mongezi Feza: Rejoice (1972) (Cadillac SGC 1017)
- Johnny Dyani/Okay Temiz/Mongezi Feza: Music For Xaba (1972) (Sonet SNTF 642)
- Johnny Dyani/Okay Temiz/Mongezi Feza: Music For Xaba, Volume Two (1972) (Sonet SNTF 824)
- Mongezi Feza: Free Jam (2-CD) (1972) (Ayler Records aylCD-048/049 released in 2004)
- Nils Sandstroem: The Painter (1972) (EMI Odeon 062-34659)
- Bengt-Arne Wallin: Wallin/Wallin (1972) (Dux 6368002)
- Gunnar "Siljabloo" Nilson: "Flickan med den bruna hyn/Det kaenns skoent, det kaenns bra" (7" single). (1972) (Odeon E006-34609)
- Maffy Falay & Sevda: Live at Fregatten (1973) (Sonet SNTF 665 - Kent STX 87020)
- Salih Baysal: The Myth (1973) (Sonet SNTF 739)
- Björn J:son Lindh: Sissel (1973) (Metronome MLP 15506)
- Bernt Rosengren: Notes from underground (2-LP). (1973) (EMI-Harvest 34958/9 - EMI-Harvest 1364622)
- Bo Nilsson: Drei Szenen/Fatumeh (1973) (Phono Suecia PS 33)
- Bo Nilsson: A Spirit's Whisper (3-CD) (1973) (Phono Suecia PSCD)
- Tony Scott: Manteca (1973) (Sonet SLP 2543)
- Bjoern Jayson Lindh: Boogie Woogie (later entitled Second Carneval)(1974) (Metronome MLP 15.547)
- Okay Temiz: Turkish folk jazz (1974) (Sonet SNTF 668 - Kent STX)
- Lars Gullin: Bluesport (1974) (EMI-Harvest 1364612)
- Okay Temiz: Dokuz sekiz/Denizaltı Rüzgârları (1975) (7" single) (Yonca YCAS-076)
- Okay Temiz: Drummer of two worlds (1975/1980) (Finnadar Records/WEA 58186 - Melodi Plakları 1216)
- Okay Temiz/Johnny Dyani. Yonca (1976) (YCS LP 5013)
- Okay Temiz: Oriental Wind (1977) (Sonet SNTF 737 - Kent STX 87003)
- Lennart Aberg: Partial solar eclipse (1977) (JAPO 60023)
- Bernt Rosengren Big Band: First moves (1977) (EMI 062-35428)
- Nannie Porres: Kärlekens ögon (1977) (EMI 062-35449)
- Oriental Wind: Live in der Balver Höhle (1978) (JG Records JG 044)
- Björn Jayson Lindh: Bike voyage II (1978) (Sonet SLP-2619)(later entitled "A Day at the Surface": Sonet SNTF 833 - Vanguard VSD 79434)
- Don Cherry: Live Ankara (Sonet, 1978)
- Oriental Wind: Zikir (1979) (Sun Records SEB 11005, France - Melodi Plakları 1138, Turkey - Paddle Wheel K28P 6011, Japan)
- Okay Temiz - Oriental Wind: Zikir (1979) (KentSTX 143 100102-2, Turkey, Ada Müzik 500765, Turkey)
- Oriental Wind: "Mus/Kabak" (7" single) (1979) (Sun Records SEB 33-005, France)
- Oriental Wind: Chila-Chila. (1979) (Sonet SNTF 809)
- Hans Calderas: Ziggidim (1979) (Calderas Music Production HCLP-101)
- Oriental Wind: Bazaar (1981) (Sonet SNTF 864)
- Oriental Wind: Live in Bremen (1981) (JA&RO 007; EFA 08-4107, Germany)
- Open-Air Arbon Live 1982. (1982) (Delta Records 8355-001, Switzerland) (there's one piece by Oriental Wind on this 2-disc compilation album)
- Oriental Wind: Life road (1983) (JA&RO 013, JARO 4113-2, EFA 08-4113, Germany)
- Okay Temiz/Saffet Gündeğer: ditto. (1983) (Organic Music OM 5, Sweden - under the new name "Klasikleri 1" (Atlas Müzik 8 691044 150121, Turkey)
- Oriental Wind/The Karnataka College of Percussion: Sankirna (1984) (Sonet SNTF 930)
- Percussion Summit. (1984) (Moers Music 02056)
- Atilla Engin Group: Memories (1984) (Danish Music Production DMLP 506, Denmark)
- Atilla Engin Group: Marmaris love (1985) (Danish Music Production DMLP 510, Denmark)
- Lennart Aberg: Green prints (1985/86) (Caprice CAP 1276)
- Tayfun Erdem: Ararat. The border crossing (1986) (EMI F 669.660, Germany - under the new name "Ağrı Dağı Efsanesi" Kalan CD 298 (Turkey)
- Okay Temiz: In Europe (cass). (compilation of pieces from "Life Road"' and other work with Saffet Gündeğer) (1988) (Yankı Müzik Yapım YMC 138, Turkey)
- Okay Temiz: Derviş (cass.) (1989) (Yankı Müzik Yapım YMC 156, Turkey - under the new name "Dervish Service", Ada Müzik 500772, Turkey - under the new name "Silver Hand", Ton Son Ton/Sonet SNTCD 1020, Vasco Da Gama VDFCD-8003 Sweden).
- Okay Temiz: "Dance for peace/Locust" (12" single). (1989) (Ton Son Ton SONL10; (7" single). Ton Son Ton SON10)
- Senem Diyici Sextet: Takalar (1989) (Label La Lichere CD LLL 17 - Kalan CD 186, Turkey)
- Okay Temiz: Misket (1989) Sonet SNTCD 1031 - under the new name "Transparent Dervish": Vasco Da Gama VDFCD-8002, Sweden).
- Okay Temiz/Sylvain Kassap: Istanbul da Eylül (1989) (Label La Lichere CD LLL 67)
- Okay Temiz: Fis fis tziganes (1989) (Label La Lichere CD LLL 107)
- Wutu-Wupatu: ditto. (1989) (Ano Kato Records rei 2002 (Greece)
- Okay Temiz: Magnetic dance. (cass.) (1990) (Bayar Müzik Üretim 125, Turkey - under the new name "Okay Temiz Band", Ercan Moroğlu 123, Germany)
- Okay Temiz's Magnetic Band: Magnet dance. (1990) (Vasco Da Gama VDFCD-8000, Sweden)
- Four Drummers Drumming: Electricity. (1991) (Backyard Records Riff CD-911-2, Germany)
- 2eme Rencontre Internationale de la Clarinette Populaire (compilation with other musicians). (1991) Radio Kreiz Breizh RKB K 03, France)
- Okay Temiz: Green wave. (1992) (Uzelli CD 204, Turkey - Blue Flame DTM 35600)
- Okay Temiz: Fishmarket. (1992–1994) (Uzelli CD 210)
- Don Cherry: Dona Nostra. (1993) (ECM 1448)
- Okay Temiz: Magnet dance (1994) (TipToe/Enja TIP-888819-2, Germany)
- Karnataka College of Percussion/Okay Temiz: Mishram (1995) (Raks Müzik 4055, Turkey)
- Okay Temiz Magnetic Band: In Finland 1995 (1995) (Ano Kato Records rei 2004, Greece - under the new name "Magnetic Orient" JARO 4244-2)
- Tri Leta Druge Godbe II, 1994–1996 (compilation with other musicians) (1996) (Druga Godba CDG 002, Slovenia)
- The Black Sea Project: ditto. (1996) (Lyra ML 0660, Greece)
- Yıldız İbrahimova: Balkanatolia (1997) (Raks Müzik 006790, Turkey)
- Okay Temiz & Group Zourna: Karsilama (1998) (Ada Müzik 8 692646 500789, Turkey - JARO 4224-2)
- Okay Temiz: Yaşamın ritmi (tutorial LP) (1998) (Banvit, Turkey)
- Okay Temiz: Kutlama - Celebration (tutorial LP)(1998) (Banvit, Turkey)
- Audio Fact: Black spot (1998) (Kalan CD 103, (Turkey)
- Embryo: Istanbul/Casablanca (2-CD). (1998) (Indigo 8536-2)
- Gjallarhorn: Ranarop. Call of the sea witch (1998) (Elektra/Asylym 19627)
- Floros Floridis, Nicky Skopelitis, Okay Temiz: Our trip so far (2000) (MRecords 5204876 01013, Greece)
- Okay Temiz: Black Sea Art Project (2001) (Ada Müzik)
- Angelite: Balkan Passions (2002) (JARO 4234-2)
- Okay Temiz: Darbukas & Zurnas (2002) (Ada Müzik 8 692646 501946)
- Okay Temiz: Mehteran (2002) Ada Müzik 8 692646 501953)
- Okay Temiz: Kuzeyden Güneye Yansımalar "Senfoni" (2002) (Ada Müzik 8 692646 501977)
- Okay Temiz: Okay Temiz ve Ritim Atölyesi (2002) (Ada Müzik 8 692646 502127)
- Don Cherry: Live in Stockholm (2013) (Caprice CAP 21836)

== Other sources ==
- World Music Central - Biography of Okay Temiz
