= Dona Nostra =

Studio album by Don Cherry
- Released: 1994
- Recorded: March 1993
- Studio: Rainbow Studio; Oslo, Norway
- Genre: Jazz
- Length: 56:22
- Label: ECM; ECM 1448
- Producer: Manfred Eicher

Don Cherry chronology
Multikuti (1989)	Dona Nostra (1994)

Dona Nostra is an album by jazz trumpeter Don Cherry recorded in March 1993 and released on ECM the following year—Cherry's last album as leader prior to his death in 1995. The sextet features woodwind player Lennart Åberg and pianist Bobo Stenson, with rhythm section Anders Jormin, Anders Kjellberg, and Okay Temiz.

== Reception ==
Professional ratings
Review scores
Source	Rating
AllMusic	3/5 stars
The Penguin Guide to Jazz Recordings	3/4 stars

The AllMusic review by Scott Yanow awarded the album 3 stars stating "Although there is not much variety in mood, it is a pleasure to hear Cherry stretching out a bit on trumpet (leaving his flute at home) this late in his career".

The authors of The Penguin Guide to Jazz Recordings wrote: "There are sparks of brilliance here, but they are lost in ashpits of compromise." However, they noted: "The sound is magnificent, and Stenson demonstrates once again what a superbly responsive player he is, and Åberg amply justifies his shared credit."

Writer Michael Stephans described the album as "a beautifully wrought project," and commented: "the music ... is rather pensive throughout, but showcases [Cherry's] lyrical quality... the moods and themes... are perhaps fitting in their expansive serenity, given that it was essentially Don Cherry's final recording as a leader."

Tyran Grillo, writing for Between Sound and Space, called Dona Nostra "An album of incredible subtlety to be savored."

== Track listing ==
All compositions by Don Cherry, Bobo Stenson, Lennart Åberg, Anders Jormin, Anders Kjellberg and Okay Temiz except as indicated

1. "In Memoriam" (Åberg) - 7:48
2. "Fort Cherry" - 6:34
3. "Arrows" - 5:16
4. "M'Bizo" (Åberg) - 8:38
5. "Race Face" (Ornette Coleman) - 4:22
6. "Prayer" (Jormin, Kjellberg, Cherry, Temiz) - 4:53
7. "What Reason Could I Give" (Coleman) - 3:44
8. "Vienna" - 5:26
9. "Ahayu-da" - 9:14

== Personnel ==
- Don Cherry – trumpet
- Lennart Åberg – soprano saxophone, tenor saxophone, alto flute
- Bobo Stenson – piano

=== Additional musicians ===
- Anders Jormin – bass
- Anders Kjellberg – drums
- Okay Temiz – percussion
