= Art Deco (album) =

Studio album by Don Cherry
- Released: 1989
- Recorded: August 27, 28, and 30, 1988
- Studio: Van Gelder Studio, Englewood Cliffs, NJ
- Genre: Jazz
- Length: 55:44
- Label: A&M
- Producer: John Snyder

Don Cherry chronology
Home Boy (1985)	Art Deco (1989)	Multikuti (1988)

Art Deco is an album by jazz trumpeter Don Cherry recorded in 1988 and released on the A&M label. His quartet played at the Village Vanguard before recording the album.

== Reception ==
Professional ratings
Review scores
Source	Rating
AllMusic	4/5 stars
Tom Hull – on the Web	A−

The AllMusic review by Scott Yanow awarded the album 4 stars stating "this set is quite accessible and finds all of the musicians in top form".

Writer Michael Stephans called the album "surprisingly traditional-sounding," and commented: "The session is quite relaxed, and... all four musicians are at the top of their game."

== Track listing ==
All compositions by Don Cherry except where noted

1. "Art Deco" - 8:38
2. "When Will the Blues Leave?" (Ornette Coleman) - 7:08
3. "Body and Soul" (Frank Eyton, Johnny Green, Edward Heyman, Robert Sour) - 6:30
4. "Bemsha Swing" (Denzil Best, Thelonious Monk) - 9:39
5. "Maffy" - 0:39
6. "Folk Medley" (Charlie Haden) - 2:42
7. "The Blessing" (Coleman) - 5:32
8. "Passing" - 3:00
9. "I've Grown Accustomed to Her Face" (Frederick Loewe, Alan Jay Lerner) - 6:50
10. "Compute" (Coleman) - 5:05

== Personnel ==
- Don Cherry — trumpet
- James Clay — tenor saxophone
- Charlie Haden — bass
- Billy Higgins — drums
