= Brown Rice (album) =

Studio album by Don Cherry
- Released: 1975 (Italy); 1977 (North America, Japan)
- Recorded: 1975
- Studios: Basement Recording Studio, NY; Grog Kill Studio, NY
- Genres: Jazz fusion; world fusion
- Length: 39:17
- Label: EMI
- Producer: Corrado Bacchelli

Don Cherry chronology
| Orient (1974) | Brown Rice (1975) | Hear & Now (1976) |

1977 self-titled issue

Brown Rice, reissued as Don Cherry, is a studio album recorded in 1975 by trumpeter Don Cherry. The album presents a fusion of jazz with rock, African, Indian, and Arabic music.

== Background ==
The album was recorded across two New York studios: the Basement Recording Studio and Grog Kill Studio. The 1975 issue's artwork features tapestries sewn by Cherry's wife, Moki Cherry.

== Release history ==
The album was first titled Brown Rice for its 1975 release. EMI Records originally released the album in Italy under this title. Horizon Records reissued the album in 1977, re-titling it Don Cherry.

John Snyder and Rudy Van Gelder prepared a digital master at Van Gelder Studio in 1988, and in 1989 A&M Records released Brown Rice on compact disc. The album was reissued on vinyl in 2019.

== Reception ==
Professional ratings
Review scores
| Source | Rating |
|---|---|
| AllMusic | 4.5/5 stars |
| Christgau's Record Guide | B+ |
| DownBeat | 4.5/5 stars |
| Penguin Guide to Jazz | 4/4 stars |
| Pitchfork | 9.2/10 |
| The Rolling Stone Jazz Record Guide | 2/5 stars |
| Tom Hull – on the Web | B+ |

The Allmusic review by Steve Huey called Brown Rice "the most accessible entry point into Cherry's borderless ideal, jelling into a personal, unique, and seamless vision that's at once primitive and futuristic in the best possible senses of both words," concluding that "he would never quite reach this level of wild invention again". Pitchfork called the album "the most focused version" of Cherry's vision, concluding that "in its balance of noise and bliss, beauty and chaos, Brown Rice is true world music". Brian Morton and Richard Cook, writing for The Penguin Guide to Jazz, called Brown Rice "a lost classic of the era and probably the best place to sample the trumpeter as both soloist – he blows some stunningly beautiful solos here – and as the shamanic creator of a unique, unearthly sound that makes dull nonsense of most 'fusion' work of the period.… Exceptional and recommended".

Carl Braurer, writing for Cadence, called the album "Cherry at his finest", but suggested that the title track and "Degi-Degi" were the least successful tracks and would have benefited from shorter running times. The All Music Guide to Jazz, which reprinted Braurer's review, marked the album as a landmark recording. The 1985 Rolling Stone Jazz Record Guide negatively described the album as an unsuccessful crossover attempt ruined by "electronic indulgence and poor playing".

== Track listing ==
All compositions by Don Cherry except where noted

1. "Brown Rice" – 5:15
2. "Malkauns" (Bengt Berger, Don Cherry) – 14:02
3. "Chenrezig" – 12:51
4. "Degi-Degi" – 7:06
- Recorded at The Basement Recording Studios in New York (tracks 1, 2 & 4) and at Grog Kill in Woodstock (track 3)

== Personnel ==
- Don Cherry – trumpet, piano, electric piano, vocals
- Frank Lowe – saxophone (tracks 1, 3 and 4)
- Ricky Cherry – piano, electric piano (tracks 1, 3 and 4)
- Charlie Haden – bass (tracks 1, 2 and 4)
- Billy Higgins – drums
- Verna Gillis – vocals (track 1)
- Bunchie Fox – bongos (track 1)
- Hakim Jamil – bass (track 3)
- Moki Cherry – tambura (track 2)

Carl Brauer noted apparent errors in the album's credits: "Don Cherry does not play trumpet on 'Brown Rice,' but he does play it on 'Degi-Degi,' and for the life of me I can't hear Frank Lowe's tenor on that track."

Additional personnel

- Corrado Bacchelli – producer
- Beppe Muccioli – associate producer
- Stanley Crouch – liner notes
