= Don Cherry (trumpeter) =

American jazz trumpeter (1936–1995)

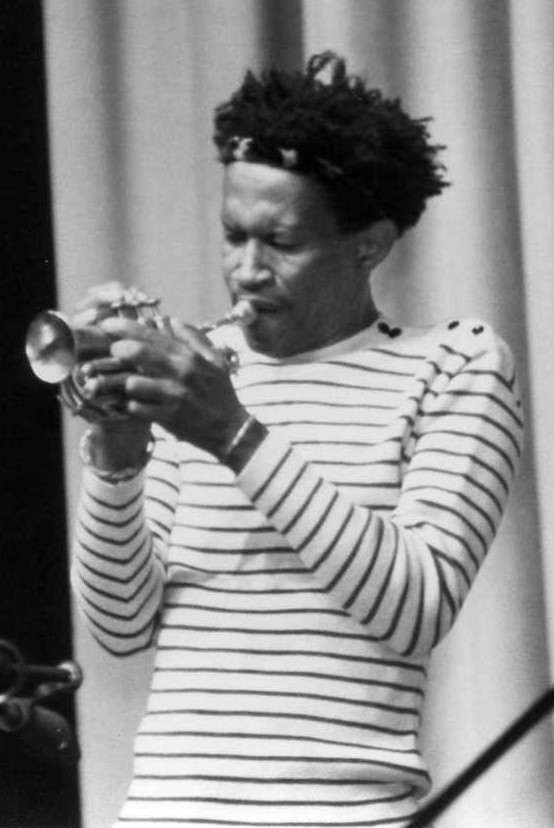
- Cherry performing in Münster, Germany, 1987

Background information
- Born: Donald Eugene Cherry; November 18, 1936; Oklahoma City, Oklahoma, U.S.
- Died: October 19, 1995 (aged 58) Málaga, Andalusia, Spain
- Genres: Free jazz; avant-garde jazz; world fusion
- Occupation: Musician
- Instruments: Cornet; trumpet; piano; flute; tambura; gamelan

Donald Eugene Cherry (November 18, 1936 – October 19, 1995) was an American jazz trumpeter, bandleader, and multi-instrumentalist. Beginning in the late 1950s, he had a long tenure performing in the bands of saxophonist Ornette Coleman, including on the pioneering free jazz albums The Shape of Jazz to Come (1959) and Free Jazz: A Collective Improvisation (1961). Cherry also collaborated separately with musicians including John Coltrane, Charlie Haden, Sun Ra, Ed Blackwell, the New York Contemporary Five, and Albert Ayler.

Cherry released his debut album as bandleader, Complete Communion, in 1966. In the 1970s, he became a pioneer in world fusion, with his work drawing on African, Middle Eastern, and Hindustani music, as heard on the 1975 release Brown Rice. He was a member of the ECM group Codona, along with percussionist Naná Vasconcelos and sitar and tabla player Collin Walcott. Chris Kelsey of AllMusic called Cherry "one of the most influential jazz musicians of the late 20th century."

== Early life ==
Cherry was born in Oklahoma City, Oklahoma, to a mother of Choctaw descent and an African-American father. His mother and grandmother played piano and his father played trumpet. His father owned Oklahoma City's Cherry Blossom Club, which hosted performances by jazz musicians Charlie Christian and Fletcher Henderson. In 1940, Cherry moved with his family to the Watts neighborhood of Los Angeles, where his father tended bar at the Plantation Club on Central Avenue, at the time the center of a vibrant jazz scene. Cherry recalled skipping school at Fremont High School in order to play with the swing band at Jefferson High School. This resulted in his transfer to Jacob Riis High School, a reform school, where he met drummer Billy Higgins.

== Career ==
By the early 1950s Cherry was playing with jazz musicians in Los Angeles, sometimes acting as pianist in Art Farmer's group. While trumpeter Clifford Brown was in Los Angeles with Max Roach, Cherry attended a jam session with Brown and Larance Marable at Eric Dolphy's house, and Brown informally mentored Cherry. He also toured with saxophonist James Clay.

Cherry became well known in 1958 when he performed and recorded with Ornette Coleman, first in a quintet with pianist Paul Bley and later in the quartet which recorded for Atlantic Records. During this period, "his lines ... gathered much of their freedom of motion from the free harmonic structures." Cherry co-led The Avant-Garde session which saw John Coltrane replacing Coleman in the quartet, recorded and toured with Sonny Rollins, was a member of the New York Contemporary Five with Archie Shepp and John Tchicai, and recorded and toured with both Albert Ayler and George Russell. His first recording as a leader was Complete Communion for Blue Note Records in 1965. The band included Coleman's drummer Ed Blackwell as well as saxophonist Gato Barbieri, whom he had met while touring Europe with Ayler, and bassist Henry Grimes.

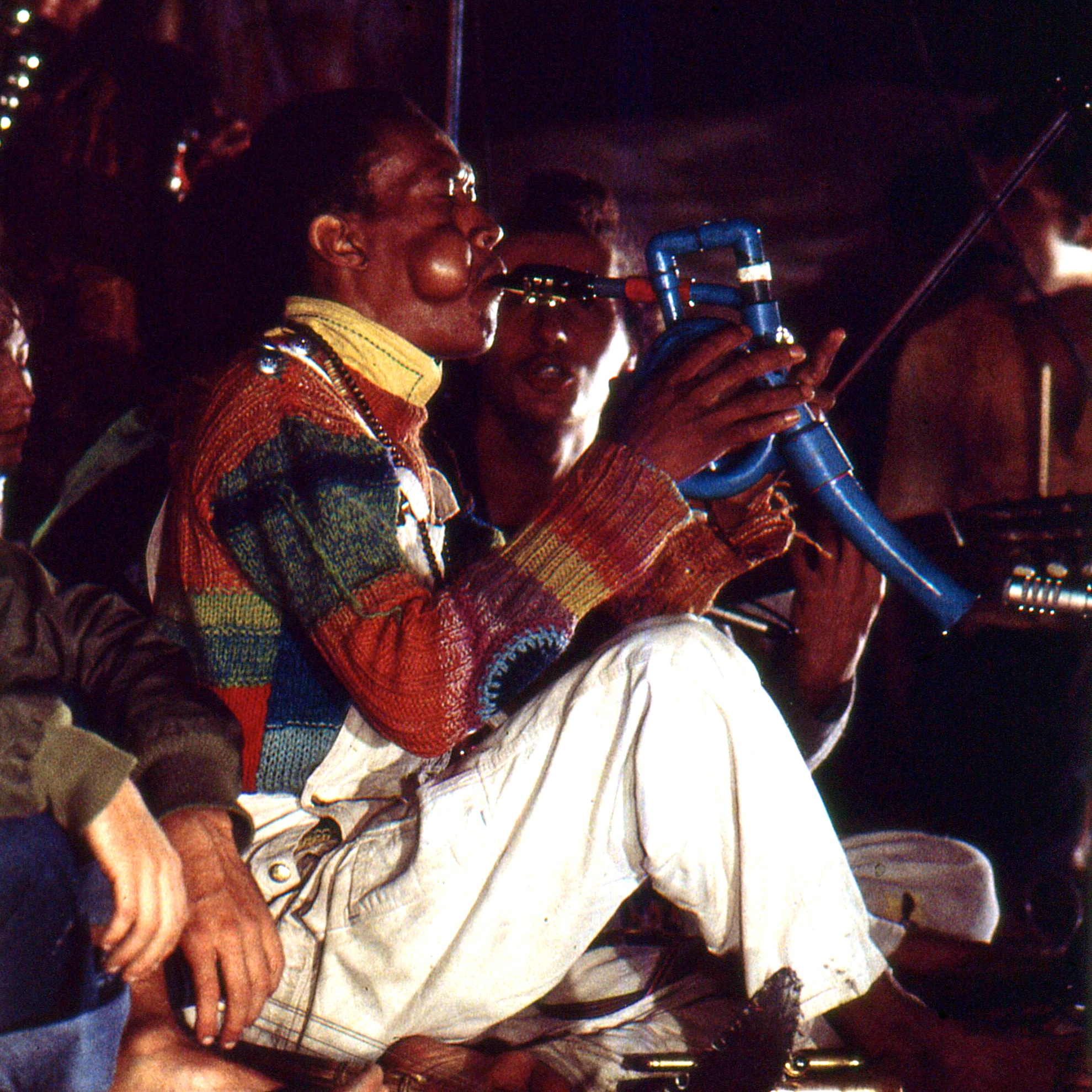
Cherry at Park Le Cascine, Florence, Italy, September 1975

After leaving Coleman's quartet, Cherry often played in small groups and duets, many with ex-Coleman drummer Ed Blackwell, during a long sojourn in Scandinavia and other locations. He traveled through Europe, India, Morocco, South Africa, and elsewhere to explore and play with a variety of musicians. In the late 1960s he settled in Tågarp, Sweden with his wife, Swedish designer and textile artist Moki Cherry. In 1968, Don Cherry taught music classes with guest lecturers, performance collaborators, and workshop leaders from around the world at Arbetarnas bildningsförbund (ABF) House, a Swedish labor movement-run education center. For ten years, Don and Moki Cherry lived and worked collaboratively in an abandoned schoolhouse in Tågarp, holding classes and performances, hosting guests and collaborators, and exploring their concept of Organic Music Society.

In 1969, Cherry played trumpet and other instruments for poet Allen Ginsberg's 1970 LP Songs of Innocence and Experience, a musical adaptation of William Blake's poetry collection of the same name. He appeared on Coleman's 1971 LP Science Fiction, and from 1976 to 1987 reunited with Blackwell and fellow Coleman alumni Dewey Redman and Charlie Haden as Old and New Dreams. Old and New Dreams recorded four albums (two for ECM and two for Black Saint) where Cherry's "subtlety of rhythmic expansion and contraction" was noted.

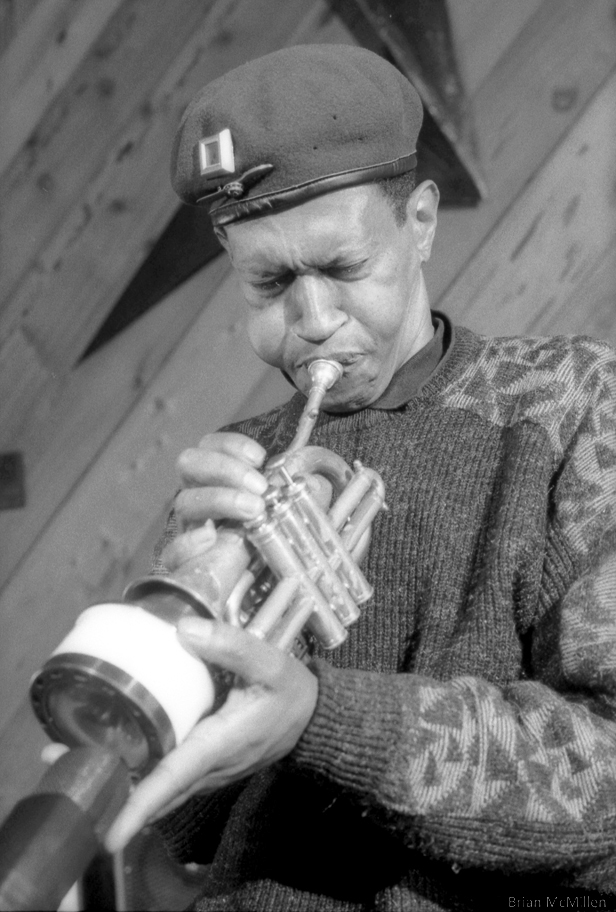
Don Cherry in 1989

In the 1970s, Cherry ventured into the developing genre of world fusion music. Cherry incorporated influences of Middle Eastern, African, and Indian music into his playing. He studied Indian music with Vasant Rai in the early seventies. From 1978 to 1982, he recorded three albums for ECM with "world jazz" group Codona, consisting of Cherry, percussionist Naná Vasconcelos and sitar and tabla player Collin Walcott.

Cherry also collaborated with classical composer Krzysztof Penderecki on the 1971 album Actions. In 1973, he co-composed the score for Alejandro Jodorowsky's film The Holy Mountain, together with Jodorowsky and Ronald Frangipane.

At the end of the 1970s, the trio Organic Music Theater (with Gian Piero Pramaggiore and Naná Vasconcelos) had an intense live activity in Italy and France.

In 1982, Cherry released the duet album El Corazon with Ed Blackwell. He also released two albums as a bandleader in the 1980s: Home Boy (Sister Out) in 1985 and Art Deco in 1988. He recorded again with the original Ornette Coleman Quartet on the first disc of Coleman's 1987 album In All Languages.

Other playing opportunities in his career came with Carla Bley's 1971 opera Escalator over the Hill and as a sideman on recordings by Lou Reed, Ian Dury, Rip Rig + Panic, and Sun Ra. Cherry played with Ian Dury and the Blockheads on their 1980 tour, including the final gig on Christmas Eve, which was broadcast live by the BBC, from the Dominion Theatre in London, on The Old Grey Whistle Test. He also toured UK and Europe with the band in 1981.

In 1992, Don Cherry was invited by renowned Indian violinist L. Shankar to perform in Mumbai, India. This interaction was captured in a documentary film titled "Rhythms of the World: Bombay and all the Jazz". In 1994, Cherry appeared on the Red Hot Organization's compilation Stolen Moments: Red Hot + Cool, on a track titled "Apprehension", alongside the Watts Prophets. This album, meant to raise awareness of the HIV/AIDS epidemic among African-Americans, was named "Album of the Year" by Time.

== Death and legacy ==
Cherry died of liver cancer in Málaga, Spain, on October 19, 1995, at the age of 58.

Cherry was inducted into the Oklahoma Jazz Hall of Fame in 2011.

== Family and personal life ==
Cherry was married to Monika Karlsson (Moki Cherry), a Swedish painter and textile artist, who also occasionally played tanpura with him. His stepdaughter Neneh Cherry, his step-granddaughters Mabel and Tyson, and his sons David Ornette Cherry, Christian Cherry, and Eagle-Eye Cherry, are also musicians. David Ornette Cherry died from an asthma attack at the age of 64 on November 20, 2022.

Don Cherry practiced Vajrayana Buddhism.

== Instruments ==
Cherry learned to play various brass instruments in high school. Throughout his career, he played an F. Besson (Paris) MEHA pocket cornet (though he identified this as a pocket trumpet), trumpet, cornet, flugelhorn, and bugle.

Cherry began his career as a pianist, and continued playing piano and organ as secondary instruments throughout his career.

After returning from a musical and cultural journey through Africa, he often played the donso ngoni, a harp-lute with a gourd body originating from West Africa (see ngoni). During his international journeys, Cherry also collected a variety of non-Western instruments, which he mastered and often played in performances and on recordings. Among these instruments were berimbau, bamboo flutes and assorted percussion instruments.

== Technique and style ==
Cherry's trumpet influences included Miles Davis, Fats Navarro, Clifford Brown, and Harry Edison. Journalist Howard Mandel suggests Henry "Red" Allen as a precedent (given Allen's "blustery rather than Armstrong-brazen brass sound, jauntily unpredictable melodic streams, squeezed-off and/or half-valve effects and repertoire including novelty vocals") while Ekkehard Jost cites Wild Bill Davison.

Some critics have noted shortcomings in Cherry's technique. Ron Wynn writes that "[Cherry's] technique isn't always the most efficient; frequently, his rapid-fired solos contain numerous missed or muffed notes. But he's a master at exploring the trumpet and cornet's expressive, voice-like properties; he bends notes and adds slurs and smears, and his twisting solos are tightly constructed and executed regardless of their flaws." Jost notes the tendency for writers to focus on Cherry's "technical insecurity", but asserts that "the problem lies elsewhere. Perfect technical control in extremely fast tempos was more or less risk-free as long as the improviser had to deal with standard changes that were familiar to him from years of working with them.... In the music of the Ornette Coleman Quartet—a 'new-found-land' where the laws and habits of functional harmony do not apply—there is no use for patterns that had been worked out on that basis."

Miles Davis was initially dismissive of Cherry's playing, claiming that "anyone can tell that guy's not a trumpet player—it's just notes that come out, and every note he plays he looks serious about, and people will go for that, especially white people." According to Cherry, however, when Davis attended an Ornette Coleman performance at the Five Spot Café in Greenwich Village, he was impressed with Cherry's playing and sat in with the group using Cherry's pocket trumpet. Later, in a 1964 DownBeat blindfold test, Davis indicated that he liked Cherry's playing.

== Discography ==
As leader or co-leader

Recording date	Release date	Album	Label	Notes
1960	1966	The Avant-Garde	Atlantic	With John Coltrane
1965	1966	Togetherness	Durium	Also released as Gato Barbieri & Don Cherry
1965	2020	Cherry Jam	Gearbox	EP
1965	1966	Complete Communion	Blue Note	
1966	2007	Live at Cafe Montmartre 1966 Volume 1	ESP-Disk	
1966	2008	Live at Cafe Montmartre 1966 Volume 2	ESP-Disk	
1966	2009	Live at Cafe Montmartre 1966 Volume 3	ESP-Disk	
1966	1967	Symphony for Improvisers	Blue Note	
1966	1969	Where Is Brooklyn?	Blue Note	
1968	2021	The Summer House Sessions	Blank Forms	
1968/1971	2013	Live In Stockholm	Caprice	
1968	1969	Eternal Rhythm	MPS	
1969	1969	Mu First Part	BYG Records	With Ed Blackwell
1969	1970	Mu Second Part	BYG Records	With Ed Blackwell
1969	1978	Live Ankara	Sonet	
1969-1970	1970	Human Music	Flying Dutchman	With Jon Appleton
1971	1971	Actions	Philips	With Krzysztof Penderecki
1971	1974	Orient	BYG Records	
1971	1974	Blue Lake	BYG Records	
1972	1972	Organic Music Society	Caprice	
1972	2019	Universal Silence	Lepo Glasbo	With Carlos Ward and Dollar Brand
1972	2021	Organic Music Theatre Festival De Jazz De Chateauvallon 1972	Blank Forms	With Naná Vasconcelos
1973	1973	Relativity Suite	JCOA	With the Jazz Composer's Orchestra
1973	1974	Eternal Now	Sonet	
1975	1975	Brown Rice	Horizon	Also released as Don Cherry
1976	1977	Hear & Now	Atlantic	
1976	2020	Om Shanti Om	Black Sweat	
1977	2014	Modern Art	Mellotronen	
1982	1982	El Corazón	ECM	With Ed Blackwell
1985	1985	Home Boy (Sister Out)	Barclay	
1986	2002	Nu: Live at the Bracknell Jazz Festival, 1986	Barclay	
1987	2021	Nu: Live in Glasgow	Mark Helias self-released	
1988	1989	Art Deco	A&M	
1988-1990	1990	Multikulti	A&M	
1993	1994	Dona Nostra	ECM	

With Old and New Dreams

- Old and New Dreams (Black Saint, 1976)
- Old and New Dreams (ECM, 1979)
- Playing (ECM, 1980)
- A Tribute to Blackwell (Black Saint, 1987)

With Codona

- Codona (ECM, 1979)
- Codona 2 (ECM, 1981)
- Codona 3 (ECM, 1983)

=== As sideman ===
With Ornette Coleman

- Something Else!!!! (Contemporary, 1958)
- Tomorrow Is the Question! (Contemporary, 1959)
- The Shape of Jazz to Come (Atlantic, 1959)
- Change of the Century (Atlantic, 1960)
- Twins (Atlantic, 1959–60 [1971])
- The Art of the Improvisers (Atlantic, 1959–61 [1970])
- To Whom Who Keeps a Record (Atlantic, 1959–60 [1975])
- This is our Music (Atlantic, 1960)
- Free Jazz: A Collective Improvisation (Atlantic, 1960)
- Ornette! (Atlantic, 1961)
- Ornette on Tenor (Atlantic, 1961)
- Crisis (Impulse!, 1969)
- Science Fiction (Columbia, 1971)
- Broken Shadows (Columbia, 1971 [1982])
- The Complete Science Fiction Sessions (Columbia, 1971–1972 [2000])
- In All Languages (Caravan of Dreams, 1987)

With the New York Contemporary Five

- Consequences (Fontana, 1963)
- New York Contemporary Five Vol. 1 (Sonet, 1963)
- New York Contemporary Five Vol. 2 (Sonet, 1963)
- Bill Dixon 7-tette/Archie Shepp and the New York Contemporary Five (Savoy, 1964)

With Albert Ayler

- Ghosts (Debut, 1964)
- The Hilversum Session (Osmosis, 1964)
- New York Eye and Ear Control (ESP, 1965)
- The Copenhagen Tapes (Ayler, 2002)

With Ed Blackwell

- Shades of Edward Blackwell (recorded 1968; Mosaic, 2014, The Complete Clifford Jordan Strata-East Sessions)
- What It Be Like? Ed Blackwell Project Vol. 2 (Enja, 1992) (one track)

With Carla Bley

- Escalator over the Hill (JCOA, 1971)

With Paul Bley

- Live at the Hilcrest Club 1958 (Inner City, 1958 [1976])
- Coleman Classics Volume 1 (Improvising Artists, 1958 [1977])

With Bongwater

- Double Bummer (Shimmy-Disc [1988])

With Charles Brackeen

- Rhythm X (Strata-East, 1973)

With Allen Ginsberg

- Songs of Innocence and Experience (MGM, 1970)

With Charlie Haden

- Liberation Music Orchestra (Impulse!, 1969)
- The Golden Number (1976) (one track)
- The Ballad of the Fallen (ECM, 1986)
- The Montreal Tapes: with Don Cherry and Ed Blackwell (Verve, 1989 [1994])

With Abdullah Ibrahim

- The Journey (Chiaroscuro, 1977)

With Clifford Jordan

- In the World (Strata-East, 1969 [1972])

With Steve Lacy

- Evidence (New Jazz, 1962)

With Michael Mantler

- The Jazz Composer's Orchestra (ECM, 1968)
- No Answer (WATT/ECM 1973)

With Sunny Murray

- Sonny's Time Now (Jihad, 1965)

With Jim Pepper

- Comin' and Goin' (Europa, 1983)

With Sonny Rollins

- Our Man in Jazz (RCA Victor, 1962)

With George Russell

- George Russell Sextet at Beethoven Hall (MPS, 1965)

With Sun Ra

- Hiroshima (1983)
- Stars That Shine Darkly (1983)
- Purple Night (A&M, 1990)
- Somewhere Else (Rounder, 1993)

With Lou Reed

- The Bells (Arista, 1979)

With Charlie Rouse

- Epistrophy (Landmark, 1989)

With others

- Wilbur Ware – Super Bass (Wilbur Ware Institute, recorded 1968, released 2012)
- Albert Heath and James Mtume along with Herbie Hancock and Ed Blackwell – Kawaida (1969)
- Alejandro Jodorowsky - The Holy Mountain Soundtrack (1973)
- Terry Riley – Terry Riley and Don Cherry Duo (B.Free, 1975)
- Steve Hillage – L (1976)
- Collin Walcott – Grazing Dreams (ECM, 1977)
- Latif Khan – Music/Sangam (1978)
- Johnny Dyani – Song for Biko (1978)
- Masahiko Togashi - Session In Paris, Vol. 1 "Song Of Soil" (Take One/King, 1979)
- Bengt Berger – Bitter Funeral Beer (ECM, 1981)
- Rip Rig + Panic – I Am Cold (1982)
- Bengt Berger Bitter Funeral Beer Band – Live in Frankfurt (1982)
- Billy Bang – Untitled Gift (Anima, 1982)
- Dag Vag – Almanacka (1983)
- Frank Lowe – Decision in Paradise (Soul Note, 1984)
- Jai Uttal – Footprints (1990)
