= Buddy's knife jazzedition =

German book publisher

buddy's knife jazzedition is a book publisher in Cologne, Germany that specializes in the publication of jazz books. It was established in 2007 by editor and ethnologist Renate Da Rin.

== Publications ==
The first volume published was a selection of poetic works by American jazz bassist Henry Grimes. Signs along the Road presents a selection of previously unpublished entries from thousands of pages of diaries he wrote during his thirty-year absence.

Also published in March 2007 was the book Who Owns Music? by William Parker. It is a compilation of his political thoughts, musicological essays and poems. Parker and his wife Patricia Nicholson Parker are founders of the Vision Festival in New York City.

Published in March 2009 was the book Subway Moon by saxophonist Roy Nathanson, former member of the Lounge Lizards and founder of the Jazz Passengers. Nathanson toured Europe with the Jazz Passengers and performed at the J.V.C. Festival in New York.

In March 2010 buddy's knife jazzedition published the anthology Silent Solos – Improvisers Speak. The anthology includes writing by Cooper-Moore, Jayne Cortez, Charles Gayle, Gunter Hampel, Oliver Lake, Yusef Lateef, Joelle Leandre, Sabir Mateen, Nicole Mitchell, William Parker, Matana Roberts, Matthew Shipp, Warren Smith, Lisa Sokolov and David S. Ware

In September 2011, the buddy's knife jazzedition published the autobiography of saxophonist Noah Howard.

In 2015 Giving Birth to Sound – Women in Creative Music was published with Renate Da Rin as editor and William Parker as co-editor. The book is a collection of contributions by 48 women musicians, including Jay Clayton, Marilyn Crispell, Joelle Leandre, Marilyn Mazur, Nicole Mitchell, Maggie Nicols, Lisa Sokolov, Fay Victor, and Jessica Williams.

== List of publications ==
- Henry Grimes: signs along the road. buddy’s knife jazzedition, Cologne 2007. ISBN 978-3-00-020142-4
- William Parker: who owns music?. buddy’s knife jazzedition, Cologne 2007. ISBN 978-3-00-020141-7
- Roy Nathanson: subway moon. buddy’s knife jazzedition, Cologne 2009. ISBN 978-3-00-025376-8
- Renate Da Rin (ed.): silent solos - improvisers speak. buddy's knife jazzedition, Cologne 2010. ISBN 978-3-00-030557-3
- Noah Howard: music in my soul. buddy's knife jazzedition, Cologne 2011. ISBN 978-3-00-034401-5
- Renate Da Rin (ed.)/William Parker (co-ed.): giving birth to sound - women in creative music. buddy's knife jazz edition, Cologne 2015. ISBN 978-3-00-049279-2
