= Solo (Henry Grimes album) =

Studio album by Henry Grimes
- Released: 2009
- Recorded: March 22, 2008
- Studio: Brooklyn, New York
- Genre: Free jazz
- Length: 2:33:55
- Label: Ilk Music; ILK151CD

Solo is a two-CD solo album by bassist/violinist Henry Grimes. It was recorded in March 2008 in Brooklyn, New York, and was released by Ilk Music in 2009.

== Reception ==
Professional ratings
Review scores
Source	Rating
AllMusic	3/5 stars
DownBeat	3/5 stars

Writing for JazzTimes, Mitch Myers commented: "With more than two and a half hours of fairly continuous playing, Solo is a dramatic tour de force. Alternating between long passages on the bass and violin, Grimes plucks and bows with great clarity and imagination, and a seemingly endless supply of bold musical ideas... It's the fearless confidence Grimes exudes on bass that is most impressive, and his stream-of-consciousness solo work puts him right up there in the pantheon of rare improvisers like his old boss Cecil Taylor. Grimes' technical mastery is sometimes overshadowed by his amazing creativity, but his organic skill with string-driven-things should serve as a clinic for devotees."

Bill Meyer of DownBeat stated that Grimes "achieves passages where incendiary abandon transmutes into rough-hewn beauty that cracks the nut of conventional harmony and finds sweet meat inside. Anyone who can warm to Billy Bang or Ornette Coleman's bowing will find something of worth when he hits his peak here... His arco playing still matches melodic fluency to a marvelously cavernous tone, and he's at his most lucid rendering bold, complex pizzicato figures." However, Meyer cautioned: "It runs two hours and 34 minutes, which is simply too long... A more listener-friendly approach that mined the session for its best moments and split them into sections would have resulted in a much stronger album."

In a review for AllMusic, Michael G. Nastos wrote: "While it certainly has its moments, the recording goes on and on and on to the point that it makes for a challenging listening experience, even for the most devoted Grimes fan. Moving back and forth between bowed or plucked contrabass and violin, the tones and themes he constructs tackle a combination of harmonic overtone techniques, soulful bluesy inferences, and soaring stratospheric demonstrations within a relative no-time framework. As one listens, occasional melodic themes do crop up, but you have to be patient in order to get to them. There's a playful attitude as Grimes rambles though whole, half, and quarter notes, plucked or explored harmonics with his bow... How you listen to this gargantuan effort depends on your patience for purely abstract music."

== Track listing ==
=== Disc 1 ===
1. "Solo (Part 1)" – 1:16:47

=== Disc 2 ===
1. "Solo (Part 2)" – 1:17:08

== Personnel ==
- Henry Grimes – bass, violin
