= Multikulti (album) =

Studio album by Don Cherry
- Released: 1990
- Recorded: December 27, 1988; November 7, 8 & 29, 1989; January 20, 1990; February 23, 1990
- Genre: Jazz
- Length: 55:44
- Label: A&M
- Producer: David Cherry & John L. Price

Don Cherry chronology
Art Deco (1988)	Multikulti (1990)	Dona Nostra (1993)

Multikulti is an album by jazz trumpeter Don Cherry recorded between 1988 and 1990 and released in 1991 on the A&M label.

== Reception ==
Professional ratings
Review scores
Source	Rating
AllMusic	4/5 stars
Select	4/5 medals
Tom Hull – on the Web	B+

The AllMusic review by Michael G. Nastos stated: "As a standalone single CD, this recording, done over a three-year period and more than any other from Don Cherry, represents a full spectrum overview of all the phases in his nomadic adult musical life". The Calgary Herald dismissed the album as "another selection of National Geographic sounds."

Writer Michael Stephans commented that "the recording is vintage world music Cherry, and is mostly very enjoyable."

== Track listing ==
All compositions by Don Cherry except as indicated

1. "Trumpet" – 0:45
2. "Multikulti Soothsayer" – 5:26
3. "Flute" – 1:08
4. "Birdboy – 4:41
5. "Melodica" – 1:26
6. "Dedication To Thomas Mapfumo" – 4:23
7. "Pettiford Bridge" (Carlos Ward) – 4:44
8. "Piano / Trumpet" – 2:25
9. "Until The Rain Comes" (Peter Apfelbaum) – 12:17
10. "Divinity-Tree" – 5:14
11. "Rhumba Multikulti" (Don Cherry, Josh Jones, Robert Huffman) – 4:10
12. "Multikulti Soothsayer Player" – 4:27

- Recorded at Paramount Studios in Hollywood, California (track 4) on 27 December 1988, at Fantasy Recording Studios in Berkeley, California on 7 November 1989 (tracks 9 & 10) and 8 November 1989 (track 11), at BMG Recording Studios in New York City on 20 November 1989 (tracks 6 & 7) and 20 January 1990 (tracks 1, 3, 5, 8 & 12), and at Serafine Studios in Santa Monica, California, on 23 February 1990 (track 2)

== Personnel ==
- Don Cherry — pocket trumpet, doussn'gouni, vocals, flute, melodica, piano
- A Watts Prophet, Anthony Hamilton, Ingrid Sertso – vocals
- Frank Serafine, David Cherry – synthesizer
- John L. Price – drum programming
- Bo Freeman – bass
- Mark London Sims – bass
- Karl Berger – marimba, vocals
- Bob Stewart – tuba
- Carlos Ward – alto saxophone
- Naná Vasconcelos – percussion
- Ed Blackwell, Deszon X. Claiborne – drums
- Peter Apfelbaum – tenor saxophone, cowbell, marimba, organ, synthesizer, bells, gong, palitos, vocals
- Jessica Jones, Tony Jones – tenor saxophone
- Joshua Jones – drums, timbales, cowbell, vocals
- Robert Huffman – congas, bell tree, vocals
- Peck Allmond – baritone saxophone
- Jeff Cressman – trombone, vocals
- Frank Ekeh – shekere, dunun, vocals
- Stan Franks, Will Bernard – guitar
- James Harvey – trombone
- Bill Ortiz – trumpet, vocals
- Allen Ginsberg, Claudia Engelhart, Karen Knight – chorus
