= Where Is Brooklyn? =

Where is Brooklyn?

Studio album by Don Cherry
- Released: 1969
- Recorded: November 11, 1966
- Studios: Van Gelder Studio, Englewood Cliffs, New Jersey
- Genre: Jazz
- Length: 40:52
- Label: Blue Note
- Producer: Alfred Lion

Don Cherry chronology
Symphony for Improvisers (1966)	Where is Brooklyn? (1969)	Eternal Rhythm (1968)

Where Is Brooklyn? is a studio album by Don Cherry featuring Henry Grimes, Ed Blackwell, and Pharoah Sanders recorded in 1966 and released on the Blue Note label.

In 2022, the Ezz-thetics label reissued the album along with Eternal Rhythm on the compilation Where Is Brooklyn? & Eternal Rhythm, Revisited.

== Reception ==
Professional ratings
Review scores
Source	Rating
AllMusic	4/5 stars
DownBeat	4/5 stars
The Penguin Guide to Jazz Recordings	3.5/4 stars
The Rolling Stone Jazz Record Guide	4/5 stars

The AllMusic review by Steve Huey states: "Where Is Brooklyn? is much more about energy and thoughtful group interaction than memorable themes, and so there's just a little something missing in comparison to Cherry's prior albums, even though they did also emphasize the qualities on display here. Nonetheless, it's still a fine record for what it does concentrate on; Sanders is in typically passionate form, and the rest of the ensemble members have already honed their interplay to a pretty sharp edge. It's worth hearing, even if it isn't as essential as Complete Communion or Symphony for Improvisers".

The authors of The Penguin Guide to Jazz Recordings called the album "a great piece of work," and commented: "Though it seems to go back to the less adventurous format of Complete Communion and to focus on discrete compositions rather than flowing improvisation, it has enough detail and enough thoughtful energy stashed away in each track... to create the same feel."

Writing for All About Jazz, Ollie Bivens remarked: "Where Is Brooklyn? can be challenging music. There are no melodies or toe-tapping beats. The playing is in-your-face, take-no-prisoners stuff. While certainly not an easy listen, it is still rewarding due to the heartfelt playing... For jazz fans curious about the avant-garde, the challenging music on Where Is Brooklyn? is as fine a place to start."

== Legacy ==
Free jazz trio The Thing took their name from a track on the album.

== Track listing ==
All compositions by Don Cherry

1. "Awake Nu" – 6:55
2. "Taste Maker" – 6:48
3. "The Thing" – 5:50
4. "There Is the Bomb" – 4:51
5. "Unite" – 17:48
- Recorded at the Van Gelder Studios, Englewood Cliffs, New Jersey on November 11, 1966

== Personnel ==
- Don Cherry - cornet
- Pharoah Sanders - tenor saxophone, piccolo
- Henry Grimes - bass
- Ed Blackwell - drums

== Charts ==
Chart performance for Where Is Brooklyn?
Chart (2022)	Peak position
Belgian Albums (Ultratop Wallonia)	193
