= The Tone of Wonder =

Live album by Henry Grimes
- Released: 2014
- Recorded: May 17, 2013
- Venue: Lo Spazio, Poschiavo, Switzerland
- Genre: Free jazz
- Label: Uncool Edition #2
- Producer: Cornelia Müller

The Tone of Wonder is a live solo album by bassist/violinist Henry Grimes. It was recorded in May 2013 in Poschiavo, Switzerland, and was released by Uncool Edition in 2014.

== Reception ==
In a review for London Jazz News, Geoff Winston wrote: "The Tone of Wonder is an extraordinary album. Totally absorbing, full immersion in these solo explorations... is the best way to appreciate its range, depth and inherent beauty. This studio recital... is recorded with great sensitivity and fidelity, so much so that it is one of the few occasions... when listeners can believe that the musician is in the room with them... what is it we are hearing? It's really Henry Grimes telling you everything he knows about music; it comes out of his love of music and his love of the instruments... It is a performance of pure honesty, as close as you'll get to the creative wellspring, that makes The Tone of Wonder such a unique and special album."

Writing for Jazz Views, Peter Urpeth commented: "Much time is spent on bowed bass, when the laminar flow of lines creates an almost etude-like structure, reminiscent in part of Bach or Britten's solo cello suites, rich with myriad fragments of melody, brief rhythmic inventions, and creating a real sense of counterpoint and ensemble playing. There is a kind of immensity about the entire project, from its improvisations to its high quality recording that is almost overwhelming in its delivery... Ideas emerge and are explored before being set aside and new departures opened. The gems, of which there are many in these improvisations, are left for the listener to stumble upon, to unearth in their hiding places, perhaps in the same paradigmatic many as their creator - who both makes and finds in the same moment. Such is the truly great improvisor's art... Tone of Wonder as a title says it all. This CD is a fitting testimony to the work of one of jazz music's truly great musicians."

== Track listing ==
1. "Cyclic Passions" - 41:42
2. "Soul Recall" - 29:50

== Personnel ==
- Henry Grimes – bass, violin
