= Free Jam =

Live album by Mongezi Feza with the Bernt Rosengren Quartet
- Released: 2004
- Recorded: November and December 1972
- Venues: ASEA, Stockholm
- Genre: Free jazz
- Labels: Ayler Records; 048/49

Free Jam is a double-CD live album by trumpeter Mongezi Feza. It was recorded during November and December 1972, and was released in 2004 by Ayler Records. On the album, Feza is accompanied by members of the Bernt Rosengren quartet, featuring Rosengren and Tommy Koverhult on saxophone, Torbjörn Hultcrantz on bass, and Leif Wennerström on drums. The group is also joined by percussionist Okay Temiz.

== Reception ==
Professional ratings
Review scores
Source	Rating
AllMusic	4.5/5 stars
The Penguin Guide to Jazz	2.5/4 stars
Tom Hull – on the Web	B+

In a review for AllMusic, Steve Loewy called the album "an extraordinary recording," and praised Feza's "ability to create astonishing solos at lightning speed in a largely unfettered environment." He wrote: "While the entire album is immersed in the so-called jazz avant-garde, Feza's melodic constructs are eminently listenable... Feza incorporates the advances of the 1960s and immerses himself in ecstatic blowing, with an appealingly upbeat confidence... The results are at once invigorating and thrilling... this is a critical document of both adventurous Swedish jazz, and the incredible playing of Mongezi Feza."

The authors of The Penguin Guide to Jazz Recordings described the album as "an unstructured rehearsal session involving musicians whose common ground is probably more hindrance than help," but noted that "almost anything that survives of Mongezi Feza is worth preserving."

Critic Tom Hull stated: "at last the South African trumpeter... gets something in the catalog under his own name... this is very free, loose, and noisy, typical of the anarchic avant-garde that flowered in Europe in the early '70s, which means that it depends on its own energy and good cheer to succeed -- which it delivers."

Andrey Henkin of All About Jazz commented: "The tight flow of Rosengren's saxophones against Feza exclamations, propelled along by a band that probably never heard such sounds in their life..., makes this a valuable document."

Writing for Paris Transatlantic, Dan Warburton remarked: "here are 119 minutes of furious free form jamming, and if you thought jamming was synonymous with noodling or just tooling about, think again... Feza is in his element... but Rosengren and Koverhult aren't content to play second fiddle to their visiting guest. One might regret not being able to hear the group tackle a more structured composition, but when the music flows as freely as this, it seems churlish to complain."

In an article for One Final Note, Marc Medwin wrote: "these collective improvisations show adventurous allegiance to all manner of jazz prototypes—blues, swing, hard bop and the occasional appropriation of a pop tune... These group pieces are a thick and sometimes long draught to drink, but the rewards are equally bountiful."

== Track listing ==
Disc 1

1. "Theme of the Day I" – 39:16
2. "Group Notes I" – 7:46
3. "Group Notes II" – 13:15

Disc 2

1. "Theme of the Day II" – 5:16
2. "Moong's Research I" – 4:07
3. "Group Notes III" – 21:08
4. "Moong's Research II" – 5:22
5. "Moong's Research III" – 4:19
6. "Moong's Research IV" – 4:04
7. "Group Notes IV" – 14:20
- Disc 1, all tracks, and disc 2, tracks 1–3 recorded on November 24, 1972. Disc 2, tracks 4–6 recorded on November 15, 1972. Disc 2, track 7 recorded on December 5, 1972. All tracks recorded live at ASEA in Stockholm, Sweden.

== Personnel ==
- Mongezi Feza – trumpet
- Bernt Rosengren – alto saxophone, tenor saxophone, flute, piano
- Tommy Koverhult – tenor saxophone, flute, euphonium
- Torbjörn Hultcrantz – bass
- Leif Wennerström – drums
- Okay Temiz – percussion
