= Organic Music Society =

Studio album by Don Cherry
- Released: 1972
- Recorded: August 14, 1972
- Genre: Avant-garde jazz
- Length: 74:42
- Label: Caprice
- Producers: Jan Bruér, Keith Knox, Rita Knox

Don Cherry chronology
Blue Lake (2005)	Organic Music Society (1972)	Relativity Suite (1973)

Organic Music Society is a studio album by trumpeter Don Cherry recorded in 1972 and released on the Swedish Caprice label.

== Reception ==
Professional ratings
Review scores
Source	Rating
AllMusic	3/5 stars
Tom Hull – on the Web	B+
All About Jazz	3/5 stars
All About Jazz	3.5/5 stars
PopMatters	6/10 stars

The AllMusic review awarded the album 3 stars.

In a review for All About Jazz, John Eyles wrote: "Organic Music Society will probably appeal most to Don Cherry devotees and completists. There is just enough good Cherry here to satisfy the faithful, even though it is rather diluted... The lasting message that the album leaves is that Cherry was at his very best when playing jazz trumpet rather than flirting with mystic chanting and philosophy." In a separate AAJ article, Glenn Astarita stated: "Cherry and his large ensemble intertwine the east-meets-west vibe for a set that covers a lot of ground and fuses intermodal concepts, spanning the avant-garde jazz spectrum, entrenched in highly melodic song forms."

In an article for The Quietus, Jennifer Lucy Allan commented: "The Organic Music Society period is the beating heart of Don Cherry’s oeuvre, in that the music recorded does not belong to him, but was communally created – the ecstatic, multisensory, and communal manifestation of his mantra 'this is not my music'. The album Organic Music Society is just one artefact from this crucial period."

Giovanni Russonello, writing for Jazz Times, stated that, in relation to his previous albums, "Organic Music Society... gives us a fuller picture of Cherry as ensemble leader, spiritualist and cultural synthesizer. He's at the height of his powers here."

A reviewer for Head Heritage remarked: "Ragged, but sublimely beautiful, endearingly simple and, at times, frustratingly complex, melding the ancient and the modern – all the essential paradoxes of the human condition are engaged at length."

Matthew Fiander of PopMatters wrote: "Organic Music Society is as far out there as Cherry ever got... It both shows the extent to which he spread out here... and the reach of his influence." However, he concluded: "There's a lot to admire about Organic Music Society... but that doesn't mean you'll know what to make of it all."

== Track listing ==
1. "North Brazilian Ceremonial Hymn" (Naná Vasconcelos) – 12:25
2. "Elixir" (Don Cherry) – 6:08
3. "Manusha Raga Kamboji" (Hans Isgren) – 2:19
4. "Relativity Suite" (Don Cherry) – 18:52
5. "Terry's Tune" (version one) (Terry Riley) – 1:56
6. "Hope" (Don Cherry) – 10:08
7. "The Creator Has a Master Plan" (Pharoah Sanders, Leon Thomas) – 6:28
8. "Sidhartha" (Don Cherry) – 1:59
9. "Utopia & Visions" (Don Cherry) – 6:33
10. "Bra Joe from Kilimanjaro" (Dollar Brand) – 2:33
11. "Terry's Tune" (version two) (Terry Riley) – 5:10
12. "Resa" (Don Cherry) – 5:41

== Personnel ==
- Don Cherry – trumpet, piano, harmonium, vocals
- Tommy Goldman, Tommy Koverhult – flute
- Maffy Falay – trumpet
- H'suan – trumpet, percussion
- Hans Isgren – sarangi
- Naná Vasconcelos – berimbau, percussion
- Helen Eggert, Moki Cherry – tambura, vocals
- Chris Bothen – doussn'gouni
- Tage Siven – bass
- Okay Temiz – drums
- Bengt Berger – drums, percussion
