= Kummelnäs =

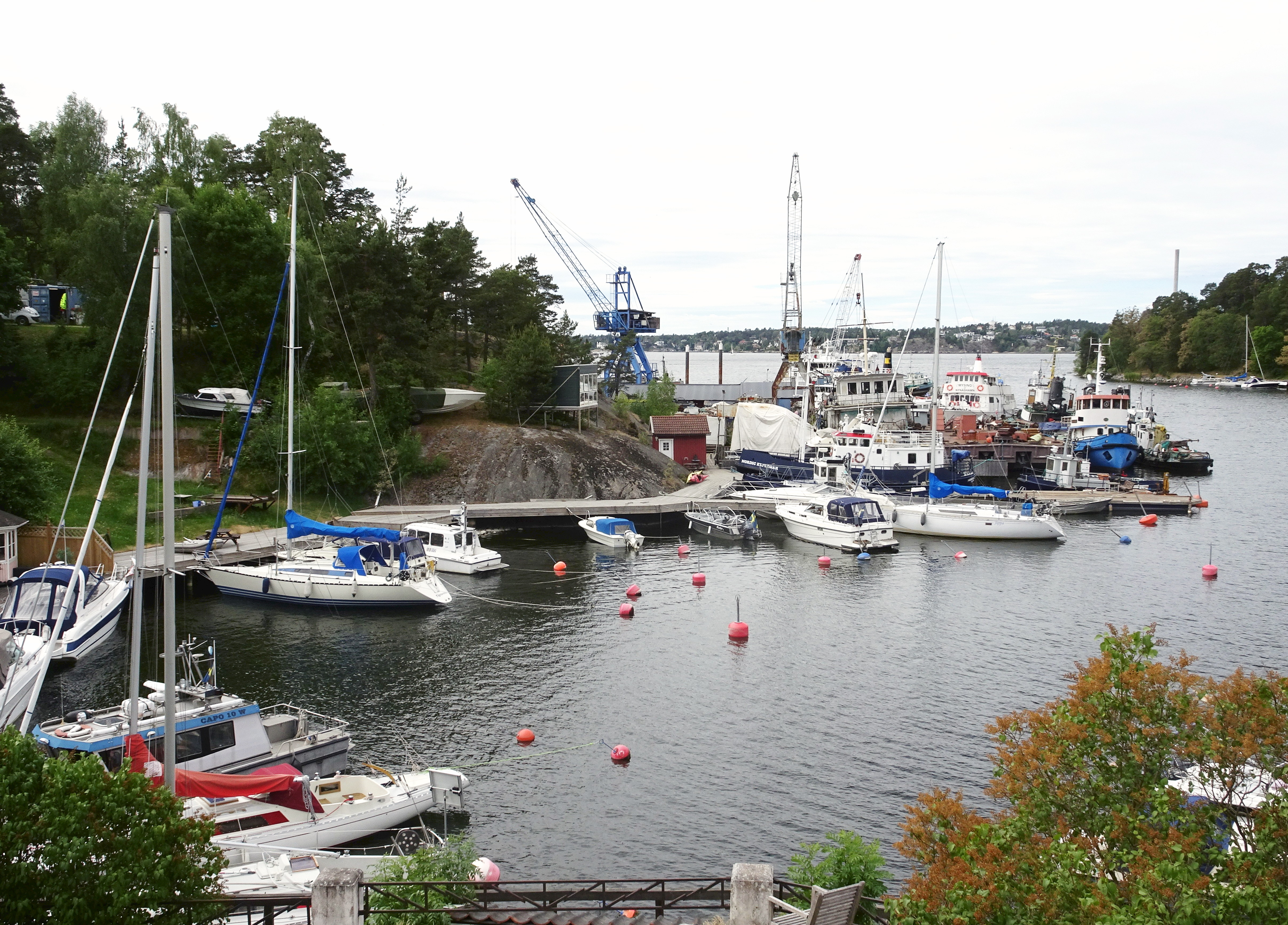

- Location within Stockholm Location within Sweden
- Coordinates: 59°21′N 18°17′E
- Country: Sweden
- Province: Uppland
- County: Stockholm County
- Municipality: Nacka Municipality

Area
  - Total: 5.30 km^{2} (2.05 sq mi)

Population (31 December 2010)
  - Total: 3,848
  - Density: 726/km^{2} (1,880/sq mi)
- Time zone: UTC+1 (CET)
  - Summer (DST): UTC+2 (CEST)

Kummelnäs is a locality situated on the island of Värmdö in Sweden's Stockholm archipelago. From an administrative perspective, it is located in Nacka Municipality and Stockholm County, and has 3,848 inhabitants as of 2010.
