= Henry Grimes =

American jazz bassist and violinist (1935–2020)

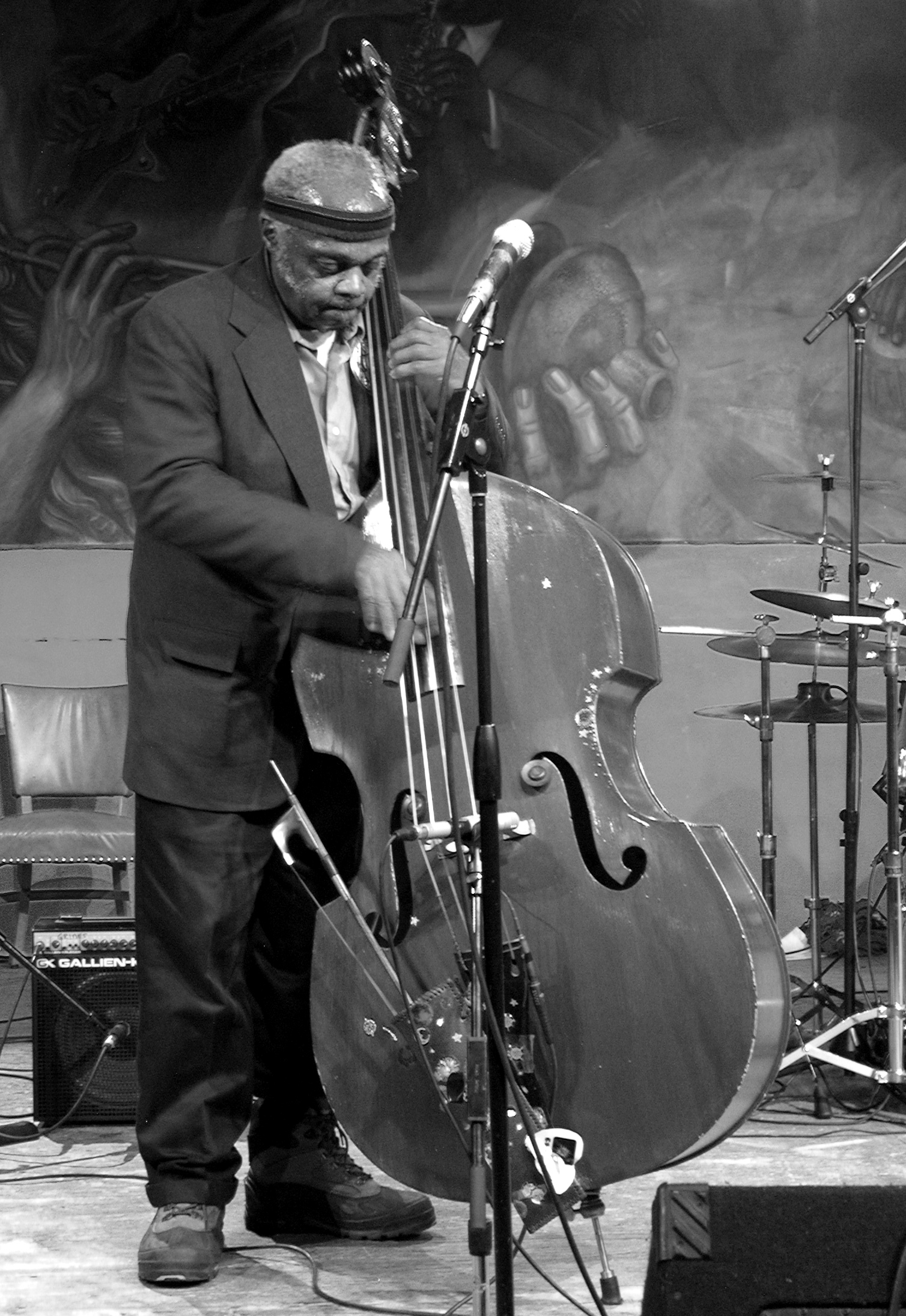
- Grimes in 2005

Background information
- Born: Henry Alonzo Grimes; November 3, 1935; Philadelphia, Pennsylvania, US
- Died: April 15, 2020 (aged 84) New York City, US
- Genres: Jazz, avant-garde
- Occupations: Musician, composer
- Instruments: Double bass, violin
- Years active: Mid-1950s–1969, 2003–2020
- Labels: Atlantic, Ayler, Blue Note, Columbia, ESP-Disk, ILK Music, Impulse!, JazzNewYork Productions, Pi Recordings, Porter, Prestige, Riverside, Verve

Henry Grimes (November 3, 1935 – April 15, 2020) was an American jazz double bassist and violinist.

After more than a decade of activity and performance, notably as a leading bassist in free jazz, Grimes completely disappeared from the music scene by 1970. Grimes was often presumed to have died, but he was discovered in 2002 and returned to performing.

== Biography ==
=== Early life and career ===
Henry Alonzo Grimes was born in Philadelphia, to parents who both had been musicians in their youth. He took up the violin at the age of 12, and then began playing tuba, English horn, percussion, finally switching to the double bass at Mastbaum Technical High School. He furthered his musical studies at Juilliard and established a reputation as a versatile bassist by the mid-1950s.

Grimes recorded or performed with pianist Lennie Tristano and saxophonists Lee Konitz, Gerry Mulligan and Sonny Rollins, pianists Thelonious Monk and McCoy Tyner, singer Anita O'Day, clarinetist Benny Goodman and many others. When bassist Charles Mingus was experimenting with a second bass player in his band, Grimes was the person he selected for the job. One of his earliest appearances on film is captured in the Bert Stern documentary on the Newport Jazz Festival of 1958, Jazz on a Summer's Day. Grimes was 22 years old, and as word spread among the musicians about his extraordinary playing, he ended up playing with six different groups in the festival that weekend: those of Benny Goodman, Lee Konitz, Thelonious Monk, Gerry Mulligan, Sonny Rollins, and Tony Scott. And though Henry's name never even appeared in the festival's printed program, New York Times critic Bosley Crowther took note of the remarkable young bassist and listed him as one of the festival's primary players.

Gradually growing interested in the burgeoning free jazz movement, Grimes performed with most of the music's important names, including pianist Cecil Taylor, trumpeter Don Cherry, saxophonists Steve Lacy, Pharoah Sanders, Archie Shepp, and Albert Ayler. He released one album, The Call, as a trio leader for the ESP-Disk record label in 1966. The album features Perry Robinson on clarinet and drummer Tom Price and is considered to be representative of his career at that time.

=== Disappearance and return ===
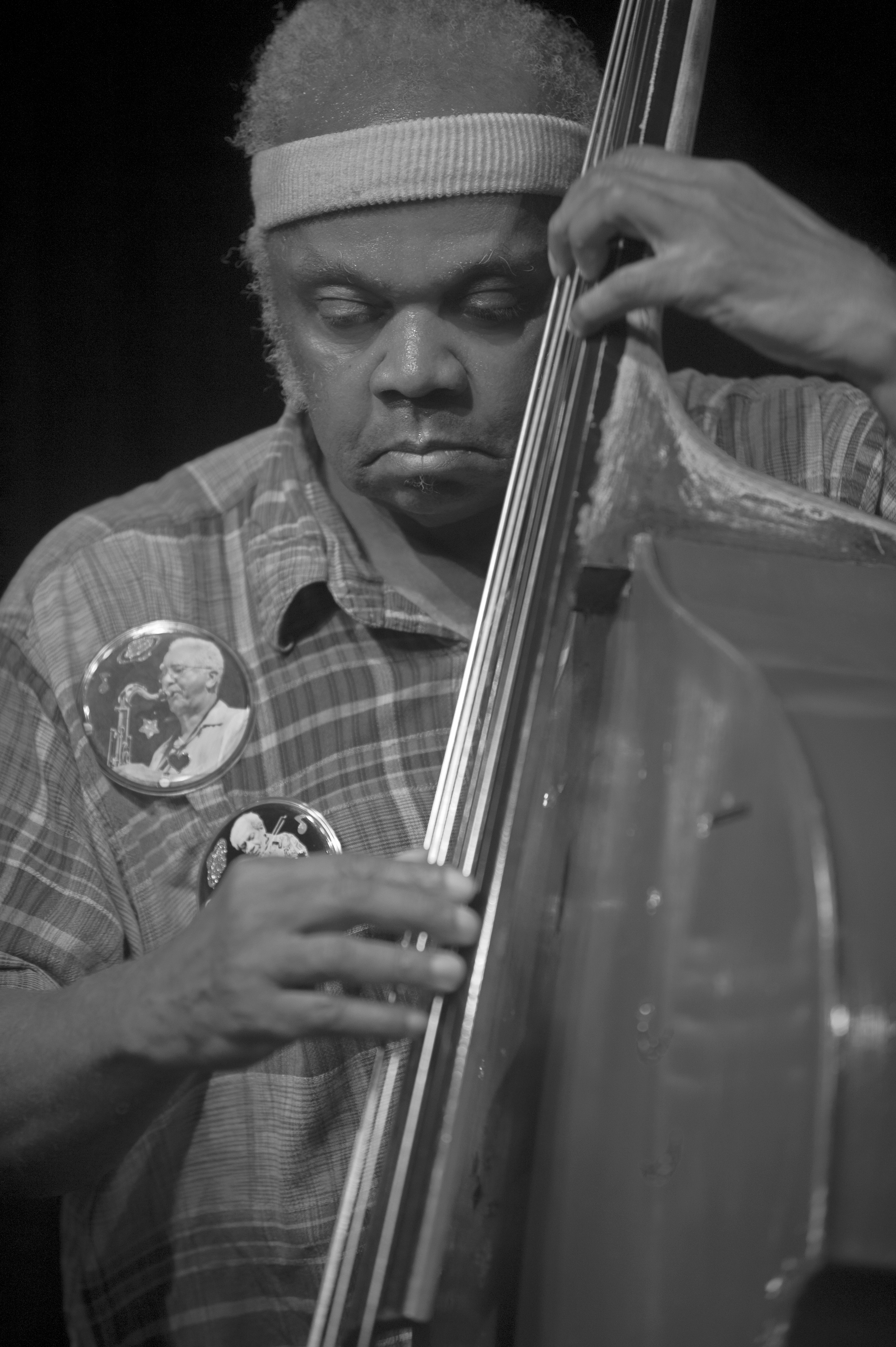
Grimes at the Vision XIII Festival

In the late 1960s, Grimes's career came to a halt after his move to California. It was commonly assumed Grimes had died; he was listed as such in several jazz reference works. Then Marshall Marrotte, a social worker and jazz fan, set out to discover Grimes's fate once and for all. In 2002, he found Grimes alive but nearly destitute, without a bass to play, renting a tiny apartment in Los Angeles, California, writing poetry and doing odd jobs to support himself. He had fallen out of touch with the jazz world and was unaware Albert Ayler had died in 1970 but was eager to perform again. Word spread of Grimes's return, and some musicians and fans offered their help. Bassist William Parker donated a bass (nicknamed "Olive Oil" for its distinctive greenish color) and with David Gage's help had it shipped from New York to Los Angeles, and others assisted with travel expenses and arranging performances. Grimes's return was featured in The New York Times and on National Public Radio. A biography, Music to Silence to Music, was published by Northway Books in London in 2015.

Making up for lost time, Grimes performed at more than two dozen music festivals or other appearances in 2003. He received a returning hero's welcome at the free jazz-oriented Vision Festival, and began teaching lessons and workshops for bassists. His November 2003 appearance on trumpeter Dennis González' Nile River Suite was the bassist's second recording in more than 35 years, the first being a JazzNewYork recording of a solo concert that Grimes played on the air from WKCR-FM's studios at Columbia University in New York within weeks of his return to New York. In 2004, he recorded as leader with David Murray and Hamid Drake; and in 2005 with guitarist Marc Ribot, who also wrote an introduction to Grimes' first book, Signs Along the Road, published in March 2007 by buddy's knife jazzedition in Cologne, Germany, a collection of Grimes' poetry in which he presents his selection of entries from thousands of pages of his writings during the long years he was not playing music. Also in 2007, Grimes recorded with drummer Rashied Ali, with whom he played a half-dozen duo concerts and a trio with Marilyn Crispell, and in 2008 with Paul Dunmall and Andrew Cyrille, a co-leader trio called the Profound Sound Trio, among others. Following his return in 2003, Grimes played at many venues around New York City and on tour in the United States, Canada, and 30 countries in Europe, the Far East, and Brazil, often working as a leader, making music with Rashied Ali, Marshall Allen, Fred Anderson, Marilyn Crispell, Ted Curson, Andrew Cyrille, Bill Dixon, Dave Douglas, Andrew Lamb, Joe Lovano, Roscoe Mitchell, William Parker, High Priest (from Anti-Pop Consortium), Wadada Leo Smith, Cecil Taylor (with whom Grimes resumed playing in October, 2006 after 40 years), John Tchicai, and many others.

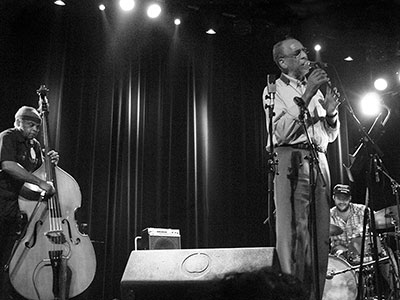
From left: Grimes, John Tchicai, and Kresten Osgood (2006)

In 2011, the Chelsea Art Museum hosted a re-creation of the performance Black Zero, a happening created in the 1960s by pioneering media artist Aldo Tambellini. Tambellini performed the multi-media piece on several occasions between 1965 and 1968, often in collaboration with jazz musicians such as Bill Dixon and Cecil McBee. The performance at the Chelsea Art Museum was produced by Swiss conceptual artist Christoph Draeger, who invited Grimes to join. Grimes played with Ben Morea, accompanying simultaneous slide and film projections by Aldo Tambellini and sound recordings of the late Calvin Hernton's radical poetry. In all, between Henry Grimes's return to the music world in 2003 and his 80th year, 2016, he played more than 640 concerts, including many festivals, in 30 countries.

In his last years, Grimes also held a number of residencies and offered workshops and master classes on major campuses, including City College of New York, Berklee College of Music, Hamilton College, New England Conservatory, the University of Illinois at Urbana–Champaign, the University of Michigan at Ann Arbor, the University of Gloucestershire at Cheltenham, Humber College, and more. He released or played on a dozen new recordings, made his professional debut on a second instrument (the violin) at Cecil Taylor's side at Lincoln Center at the age of 70, and had been creating illustrations to accompany his new recordings and publications. Grimes received many honors in recent years, including four Meet the Composer grants. He can be heard on nearly 90 recordings on various labels, including Atlantic, Ayler Records, Blue Note, Columbia, ESP-Disk, ILK Music, Impulse!, JazzNewYork Productions, Pi Recordings, Porter Records, Prestige, Riverside, and Verve. Grimes was a resident of New York City and had a busy schedule of performances, clinics, and international tours.

On June 7, 2016, he received a Lifetime Achievement Award from Arts for Art/Vision Festival on opening day at Judson Memorial Church in New York City. He stopped performing in 2018, with the relentless progression of the effects of Parkinson's disease causing severe disabilities.

=== Death ===
Henry Grimes died on April 15, 2020, at the age of 84 from complications of COVID-19. His wife, Margaret Davis-Grimes confirmed the date of his death and its cause to the Jazz Foundation of America.

== Discography ==
=== As leader or co-leader ===
- 1966: The Call (ESP-Disk)
- 2005: Live at the Kerava Jazz Festival (Ayler Records)
- 2007: The Power of Light (Not Two)
- 2008: Going to the Ritual (with Rashied Ali, Porter Records)
- 2009: Opus de Life (with Paul Dunmall and Andrew Cyrille as the Profound Sound Trio, Porter Records)
- 2009: Solo (ILK Music)
- 2010: Spirits Aloft (with Rashied Ali, Porter Records)
- 2014: The Tone of Wonder (solo, doublebass and violin, Uncool Edition)

=== As sideman ===
with Mose Allison

- I Love the Life I Live (Columbia, 1960)

with Albert Ayler

- Spirits (Debut, 1964)
- Spirits Rejoice (ESP, 1965)
- Albert Ayler in Greenwich Village (Impulse!, 1967) – live recorded in 1966–67
- Swing Low Sweet Spiritual (Osmosis, 1981) – recorded in 1965

With Bill Barron

- West Side Story Bossa Nova (Dauntless, 1963)

with Roy Burns

- Skin Burns (Roulette, 1963)

with Don Cherry

- Complete Communion (Blue Note, 1966) – recorded in 1965
- Symphony for Improvisers (Blue Note, 1967) – recorded in 1966
- Where Is Brooklyn? (Blue Note, 1969) – recorded in 1966

with Walt Dickerson

- Jazz Impressions of Lawrence of Arabia (Dauntless, 1963)

with Shafi Hadi

- Debut Rarities, vol. 3 (recorded in 1957, NYC, by the Shafi Hadi Sextet; released as Original Jazz Classics CD OJCCD-1821-2 in 1993)

with Roy Haynes

- Out of the Afternoon (Impulse!, 1962)

with Roland Kirk

- Vibrations in the Village: Live at the Village Gate (Resonance, 2025) – recorded in 1963

with Lee Konitz

- Tranquility (Verve, 1957)

with Rolf Kühn

- Be My Guest (Panorama)

with Carmen Leggio

- The Carmen Leggio Group (Jazz Unlimited)

With Gerry Mulligan

- The Gerry Mulligan Songbook (World Pacific, 1957)
- Reunion with Chet Baker (World Pacific, 1957) – with Chet Baker
- Annie Ross Sings a Song with Mulligan! (World Pacific, 1957) – with Annie Ross

with William Parker

- Requiem (Splasc(H), 2006) – with Charles Gayle

with Marc Ribot

- Spiritual Unity (Pi Recordings, 2005)
- Live at the Village Vanguard (Pi, 2014)

with Sonny Rollins

- Brass & Trio (1958)
- In Stockholm (1959)
- A Jazz Evening With: Oleo (1959)
- Sonny Meets Hawk! (1963)

with Pharoah Sanders

- Tauhid (Impulse! 1967)

with Shirley Scott

- Shirley Scott Plays Horace Silver (Prestige)

with Archie Shepp

- Further Fire Music (Impulse!)
- On This Night (Impulse!)

with Billy Taylor

- Uptown (Riverside, 1960)
- Warming Up! (Riverside, 1960)

with Cecil Taylor

- Into the Hot (Impulse! – issued under Gil Evans's name)
- Conquistador! (Blue Note)
- Unit Structures (Blue Note)

with Lennie Tristano

- Continuity (Jazz Records)

with McCoy Tyner

- Reaching Fourth (Impulse!)

with Marzette Watts

- Marzette Watts and Company (ESP-Disk)

with Frank Wright

- Frank Wright Trio (ESP-Disk)
- The Complete ESP-Disk Recordings (ESP-Disk)

Additional recent CD releases can be found online

== Books ==
- Henry Grimes, Signs Along the Road (buddy's knife jazzedition, 2007)

== Bibliography ==
- Frenz, Barbara (2015). Music to Silence to Music: A Biography of Henry Grimes, Foreword by Sonny Rollins. London: Northway Publications, ISBN 978-0-9928222-5-5.
- Feather, Leonard G. (1966). The Encyclopedia of Jazz in the Sixties, Horizon Press, p. 146, ISBN 0-517-20465-7.
- Carr, Ian, Digby Fairweather and Brian Priestley (1995). Jazz: The Rough Guide, 1st edn, Rough Guides, Ltd, p. 253, ISBN 1-85828-137-7.
