= Togetherness (Don Cherry album) =

Live album by Don Cherry
- Released: 1966
- Recorded: Spring and summer, 1965
- Venue: Paris, France
- Genre: Free jazz
- Label: Durium Records ms A 77127

Togetherness is a live album by trumpeter Don Cherry. It was recorded in the spring and summer of 1965 in Paris, France, and was released on LP in 1966 by Durium Records. On the album, which features a five-movement composition titled "Togetherness," Cherry is joined by saxophonist Gato Barbieri, vibraphonist Karl Berger, bassist Jean-François Jenny-Clark, and drummer Aldo Romano. In 1976, the album was reissued by Inner City Records with the title Gato Barbieri & Don Cherry.

== Background ==
The quintet heard on the album was formed in 1964, and was Cherry's first steady group. Berger recalled: "For the first time in my experience there was a kind of music with absolutely no problems; there was no need to talk about style... since we spoke different languages, it was hardly possible to communicate verbally... Everything we later played evolved collectively." Although all of the musicians would go on to record additional albums with Cherry in various contexts, Togetherness is the quintet's only recording.

== Other versions ==
Cherry's 1974 album Orient features a rendition of "Togetherness" with a different ensemble. Pianist Irène Schweizer included a version of "Togetherness One - First Movement" on her 2001 live album Chicago Piano Solo. In 2016, Canadian trumpeter Ellwood Epps assembled a band called Togetherness!, named after Cherry's album. The group's 2022 release includes a version of the Cherry composition.

== Reception ==
Professional ratings
Review scores
| Source | Rating |
|---|---|
| AllMusic | 3/5 stars |
| The Rolling Stone Jazz Record Guide | 4/5 stars |

In a review for AllMusic, Scott Yanow wrote: "While Cherry plays pretty free, he sounds conservative next to the often-violent wails of Barbieri. This interesting set... is for the open-minded only." Kevin Le Gendre of Jazzwise stated that Togetherness "marked out Barbieri as a brilliant new voice in the avant-garde movement." Bob Blumenthal, writing for The Rolling Stone Jazz Record Guide, called the album "a confident recital," and noted that the tracks "string playful themes together with solos that are free yet convey joy instead of the then prevalent anger."

== Track listing ==
Composed by Don Cherry.

1. "Togetherness One - First Movement" – 5:08
2. "Togetherness One - Second Movement" – 5:26
3. "Togetherness One - Third Movement" – 9:41
4. "Togetherness Two - Fourth Movement" – 12:07
5. "Togetherness Two - Fifth Movement" – 9:41

== Personnel ==
- Don Cherry – cornet
- Gato Barbieri – tenor saxophone
- Karl Berger – vibraphone
- Jean-François Jenny-Clark – bass
- Aldo Romano – drums
