= The Call (Henry Grimes album) =

Studio album by Henry Grimes
- Released: 1966
- Recorded: December 28, 1965
- Genre: Jazz
- Label: ESP-Disk; 1026

The Call is an album by bassist Henry Grimes. It was recorded in December 1965 in New York City, and was released by the ESP-Disk label in 1966. On the album, Grimes is joined by clarinetist Perry Robinson and drummer Tom Price.

== Reception ==
Professional ratings
Review scores
| Source | Rating |
|---|---|
| AllMusic | 4/5 stars |
| The Penguin Guide to Jazz | 3/4 stars |

In a review for AllMusic, Scott Yanow wrote: "Although Grimes played in a wide variety of settings in the late 1950s, he was working exclusively in the avant-garde by 1965. Teamed with clarinetist Perry Robinson in one of his earliest recordings and the obscure drummer Tom Price, Grimes gets a fair amount of solo space on these six group originals. However, it is for Robinson's playing that the adventurous but not overly memorable disc is chiefly recommended."

The authors of The Penguin Guide to Jazz awarded the album 3 stars, stating that the album was interesting "for a first view of Perry Robinson and for some strong solo statements from the leader."

== Track listing ==
1. "Fish Story" (Grimes) - 4:30
2. "For Django" (Grimes) - 11:07
3. "Walk On" (Robinson) - 3:10
4. "Saturday Nite What Th'" (Grimes) - 3:32
5. "The Call" (Robinson) - 7:51
6. "Son Of Alfalfa" (Grimes) - 3:20

== Personnel ==
- Perry Robinson – clarinet
- Henry Grimes – bass
- Tom Price – drums
