= El Corazón (Don Cherry and Ed Blackwell album) =

Studio album by Don Cherry & Ed Blackwell
- Released: 1982
- Recorded: February 1982
- Studio: Tonstudio Bauer; Ludwigsburg, West Germany
- Genre: Jazz
- Length: 44:30
- Label: ECM 1230
- Producer: Manfred Eicher

Don Cherry chronology
Codona 2 (1980)	El Corazón (1982)	Codona 3 (1982)

El Corazón is an album by jazz trumpeter Don Cherry and drummer Ed Blackwell recorded in February 1982 and released on ECM later that year.

== Reception ==
Professional ratings
Review scores
Source	Rating
AllMusic	4/5 stars
The Penguin Guide to Jazz Recordings	3/4 stars
The Rolling Stone Jazz Record Guide	4/5 stars
Tom Hull – on the Web	B+

The AllMusic review by Scott Yanow stated: "Trumpet and drum duets are not exactly commonplace, making this collaboration between Don Cherry and Ed Blackwell something special... The use of space is consistently impressive and those listeners with open ears will find this thoughtful date quite interesting".

The authors of The Penguin Guide to Jazz Recordings praised the album's "sheer clarity of sound," and wrote: "Blackwell is immense, as ever, relishing the space and music which is freed from the vertical hierarchies of harmonic jazz."

Tyran Grillo, writing for Between Sound and Space, commented: "Blackwell's approach to his kit is melodic enough to carry its own, and the superb engineering gives him a wide berth, ensuring that every element has its place. Cherry's sidelong glances into piano, melodica, and organ, meanwhile, provide plenty of traction in the duo's more adventuresome tunes."

== Track listing ==
All compositions by Don Cherry except where noted.

1. "Mutron/Bemsha Swing/Solidarity/Arabian Nightingale" (Cherry/Thelonious Monk/Cherry/Cherry) - 15:18
2. "Roland Alphonso" (Roland Alphonso) - 3:17
3. "Makondi" - 3:49
4. "Street Dancing" (Ed Blackwell) - 2:21
5. "Short Stuff/El Corazón/Rhythm for Runner" (Blackwell/Cherry/Blackwell) 7:29
6. "Near-In" (Blackwell) - 6:43
7. "Voice of the Silence" - 5:33

== Personnel ==
- Don Cherry – pocket trumpet, piano, melodica, organ, xalam
- Ed Blackwell – drums, wood drum, cowbell
