= Tågarp =

Locality in Sweden

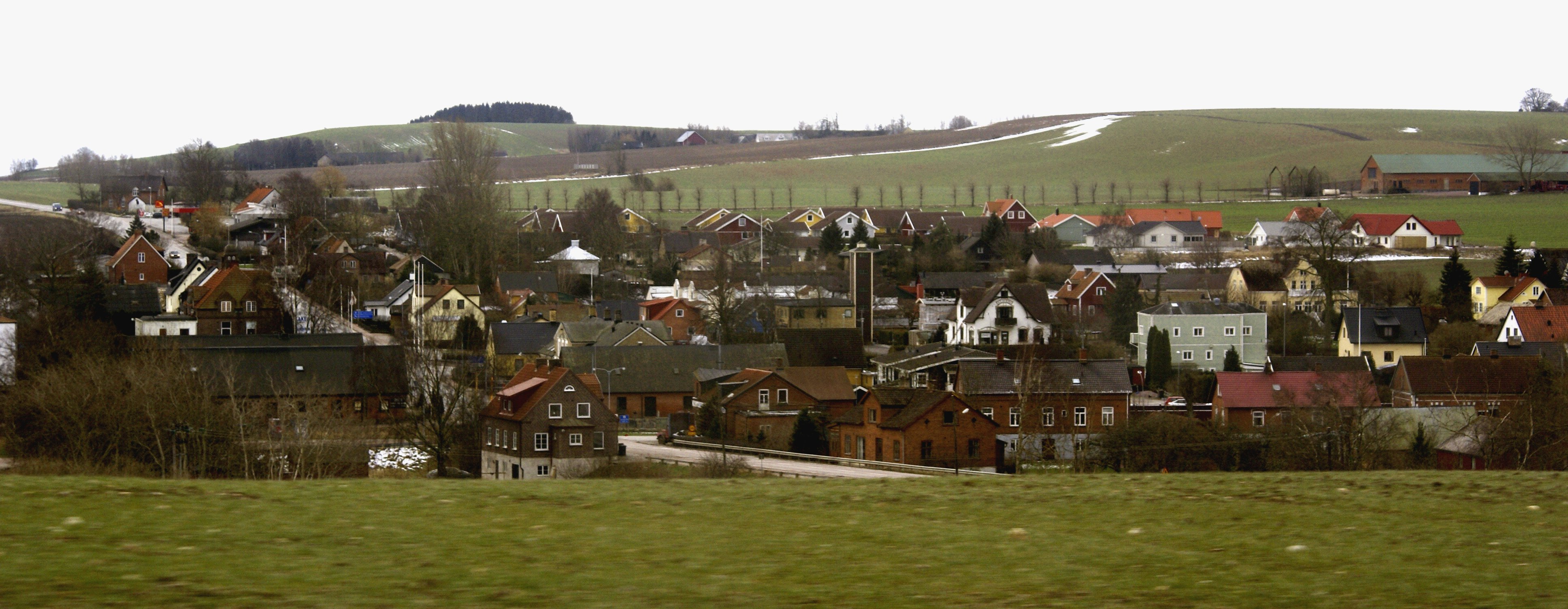

- Location within Skåne Location within Sweden
- Coordinates: 55°56′N 12°57′E
- Country: Sweden
- Province: Skåne
- County: Skåne County
- Municipality: Svalöv Municipality and Landskrona Municipality

Area
  - Total: 0.42 km^{2} (0.16 sq mi)

Population (31 December 2010)
  - Total: 431
  - Density: 1,025/km^{2} (2,650/sq mi)
- Time zone: UTC+1 (CET)
  - Summer (DST): UTC+2 (CEST)

Tågarp is a bimunicipal locality situated in Svalöv Municipality and Landskrona Municipality in Skåne County, Sweden with 431 inhabitants in 2010.

== Notable people ==
- Anna Takanen, actor, director and writer, grew up in Tågarp
