= Eternal Rhythm =

Live album by Don Cherry
- Released: 1969
- Recorded: November 11–12, 1968
- Venue: Berlin Jazz Festival
- Genres: Avant-garde jazz, jazz fusion, gamelan
- Length: 41:32
- Label: MPS
- Producer: Joachim E. Berendt

Don Cherry chronology
Where Is Brooklyn? (1966)	Eternal Rhythm (1969)	Mu (1969)

Eternal Rhythm is a live album by American jazz musician Don Cherry, released in 1969. It was recorded live at the Berlin Jazz Festival in November 1968.

In 2022, the Ezz-thetics label reissued the album along with Where Is Brooklyn? on the compilation Where Is Brooklyn? & Eternal Rhythm Revisited, albeit shortened by more than three minutes.

== Reception ==
Professional ratings
Review scores
Source	Rating
AllMusic	5/5 stars
DownBeat	5/5 stars

The AllMusic review by Brian Olewnick awarded the album 5 stars stating "Eternal Rhythm is Don Cherry's masterwork and one of the single finest recordings from the jazz avant-garde of the 1960s. It is required listening".

In a review for The Quietus, Jennifer Lucy Allan called the album "the connecting piece between the pace, tension and excitement of Cherry's free jazz playing in Ornette Coleman's groups, and the relaxed invitation to international and folk forms of rhythm that came later." She commented: "I hear this album as movement between moments, and am lifted from my seat with sheer joy, any time I hear the marching theme land 12 minutes into Part One, after the frenetic generations of the rhythm section and Sonny Sharrock's guitar are batted away by Cherry's trumpet herald, and the band falls into step for a few brief and triumphant turns around the parade ground."

== Track listing ==
1. "Eternal Rhythm Part I" – 17:49 (Don Cherry)

- a. Baby's Breath
- b. Sonny Sharrock
- c. Turkish Prayer
- d. Crystal Clear (exposition)
- e. Endless Beginnings
- f. Baby's Breath (unaccompanied)

2. "Eternal Rhythm Part II" – 23:40 (Cherry)

- a. Autumn Melody
- b. Lanoo
- c. Crystal Clear (Development)
- d. Screaming J
- e. Always Beginnings

== Personnel ==
- Don Cherry – cornet, gendèr, saron, Bengali, flute in A, bamboo flute in C, metal flute in B flat, plastic flute in C, Haitian Guard, Northern Bells, voice
- Albert Mangelsdorff – trombone
- Eje Thelin – trombone
- Bernt Rosengren – tenor saxophone, oboe, clarinet, flute
- Sonny Sharrock – guitar
- Karl Berger – vibraphone, piano, gendèr
- Joachim Kühn – piano, prepared piano
- Arild Andersen – bass
- Jacques Thollot – drums, saron, gong, bells, voice
- Heinz Bähr – cover and layout
