= Moki Cherry =

Swedish interdisciplinary artist and designer

- Cherry, sometime in the 1980s
- Born: Monika Marianne Karlsson; 8 February 1943; Koler, Sweden
- Died: 29 August 2009 (aged 66); Tågarp, Sweden
- Education: Beckmans Design School, Stockholm
- Style: Textile appliqué, woodworks, painting, ceramics, set design, sculpture and collage
- Partner: Don Cherry
- Children: Neneh Cherry; Eagle-Eye Cherry
- Website: mokicherry.com

Moki Cherry (born Monika Marianne Karlsson; 8 February 1943 – 29 August 2009) was a Swedish interdisciplinary artist and designer who worked in textiles, fashion design, woodworks, painting, collage, ceramics, and set design. Her practice traversed the worlds of art, music, and theater with diverse influences such as Indian art and music, Tibetan Buddhism, fashion, traditional folk arts and dress, abstraction, cartoons, and pop art. From 1977 she split her time living between Tågarp, Sweden and Long Island City in New York. Moki collaborated with her husband, the American jazz trumpeter, Don Cherry, throughout her lifetime – they performed in concerts as Organic Music, where her artworks were also displayed, and ran workshops for children. Her designs also appeared on Don's album covers and as costumes worn by him in concert.

== Early life ==
Moki Cherry was born Monika Marianne Karlsson on 8 February 1943 in Koler in Norrbotten, Sweden. Her father, Verner Karlsson, ran the station house and her mother, Marianne Karlsson, the post-office. When she was growing up the Karlsson family moved around the country to wherever her father was posted.

In 1962 Moki moved to Stockholm to study fashion and textiles at Beckman's School of Design, where she specialised in illustration, pattern design, and design of clothes. She was an exceptional student and received high marks. She became friends with fellow artist Susanne Beckman while they were both studying at the school and they remained life-long friends.

In Stockholm, Karlsson met a Sierra Leonean student named Ahmadu Jah (1936–2018), who had received a scholarship to study engineering at KTH Royal Institute of Technology. In 1964, their daughter Neneh Marianne Karlsson was born.

She met jazz musician Don Cherry in 1963 while he was on tour in Stockholm with Sonny Rollins. Moki and Don got to know each other more over the following years when Don returned to Stockholm to play concerts and eventually they became a couple and decided to build a life together.

== Career ==
Moki graduated from Beckman's in 1966 and traveled to New York to work in fashion and join Don who was living there at the time. In New York, she worked in painting, tapestry, and fashion design, and it was here that her and Don's lifetime of creative collaboration began. Her tapestries were used to create colourful environments for Don's performances and album artworks, such as for the covers of Brown Rice, Relativity Suite, and Organic Music Society, with the first album artwork she did being in 1969 a drawing on the front of Where is Brooklyn?. Moki was receiving recognition as a young artist-designer too and was offered a permanent design job with the photographer Bert Stern, but instead returned to Stockholm with Don and Neneh. The following year, Moki gave birth to her second child, Eagle-Eye in Stockholm, who is also a musician.

When Moki and Don returned to Sweden in 1967, they named their creative collaboration "Movement" and later renamed it "Organic Music" or "Organic Music Theatre". The first concert they did under this name was at ABF Huset in Stockholm where Moki designed the set and did live painting during the performance. In 1969, Moki and Don left Stockholm with their children to go to New York where they rented a loft in Manhattan and then a house in Congers. That same year the young family went on tour through France, Italy, and Turkey and lived together on the tour bus. From this moment of inception Moki and Don toured as Organic Music with other musicians throughout Europe. Moki played tambura in the Organic Music performances and her tapestries would surround the sets. The couple also ran music workshops for children across Sweden until 1977.

In 1970, Moki and family moved to Vermont because Don was invited to be artist-in-residence and teach at Dartmouth College for two semesters. While there, Moki and Don collaborated with students to make an opera and on the weekends, they had an open house where students could come to rehearse. After this, they moved back to Sweden and bought an old schoolhouse in Tågarp.

The Cherrys took part in an exhibition curated by Pontus Hultén called Utopias and Visions 1871–1981 (Utopier och Visioner 1871–1981) at Moderna Museet in Stockholm during the summer of 1971. They lived and performed in a geodesic dome built by Bengt Carling on Buckminster Fuller's principles for three months. During the day, they held music workshops and happenings with the public and the Taj Mahal Travellers also were involved. Moki created costumes and artworks in the dome during this residency, which included a mandala that she painted on the floor each day.

After this period, Don and Moki filmed a series of TV programs for children in Tågarp, as well as recording a series of radio programs for children in Swedish. They continued to go on tour together and traveled to the South of France to perform at jazz festivals and then to Italy.

In 1973, Moki had her first solo exhibition of tapestries and paintings at Gallery 1 in Stockholm, which featured tapestries, paintings and live music performances, as well as a smaller recreation of the bucky dome built by Bengt Carling that they lived in at Moderna Museet two years before.

== Tågarp ==
The Cherry's home at the old schoolhouse in Tågarp was a communal space where music performances, film screenings, and exhibitions took place as part of an artistic collective (Tågarp Skola Kulturförening). In 1978 Moki started Octopuss Theater, a children's theatre group, at Tågarp Schoolhouse with her friend Anita Roney and children from the area such as Anita's son Shanti Roney. Moki made the sets and costumes for the group, who performed in Malmö, Gothenburg, and in Stockholm at Moderna Museet. Many children from the theatre group went on to have careers in music, theatre, and the media.

== Later career ==
During the nineteen eighties, Moki had exhibitions of her artwork across Sweden and New York and she and Don collaborated less (although she still designed some album sleeves and clothing for him). In 1981, Moki started her "Talking Heads" sculpture series which were made out of wood and light. During the nineteen nineties, she spent more time at the loft in New York where she worked as a set designer for Apollo Theater in Harlem and began working in ceramics at Greenwich House Pottery. Moki started working predominantly in collage during the 2000s and worked in painting and tapestry in the last few years before her death.

== Death and legacy ==
Moki died on 29 August 2009 in Tågarp at age 66. There has been increasing interest in her art since her death in 2009 and she has had solo exhibitions internationally at Moderna Museet, Stockholm in 2016, Air De Paris, Paris in 2018, and Kerry Schuss, New York City in 2019, as well as being included in group exhibitions most recently at Loyal Gallery in 2019, Malmö Konstmuseum in 2017 and at "The House of Fame", Linder Sterling's expanded retrospective at Nottingham Contemporary in 2018.

== Public collections ==
- Centre Pompidou, Paris, France
- Collezione Maramotti, Reggio Emilia, Italy
- Muzeum Susch, Zernez, Switzerland
- Malmö Konstmuseum, Malmö, Sweden
- Moderna Museet, Stockholm Sweden

== List of exhibitions ==
=== Solo exhibitions ===
- 1973 Galleri 1, Stockholm, Sweden
- 1979 LAX 814 gallery, Los Angeles, USA
- 1981 Sydkrafts Konstförening, Malmö, Sweden
- 1984 Galleri Erichs, Malmö, Sweden
- 1986 Klippt och Skuret, Kristianstads Länsmuseum, Sweden
- 1991 Galleri Händer, Stockholm, Sweden
- 1992 Station Skelderhus Galleri, Ängelholm, Sweden
- 1992-3 Saint Peter's Church, NYC, USA
- 1997 Lysande Konst, Galleri Ping Pong, Malmö, Sweden
- 2003 Kulturhuset, Hässleholm, Sweden
- 2007 Sleight of Hand – Collages by Moki Cherry, Art-O-Mat, Long Island City, USA
- 2008 Don Cherry Exhibition, Sant'Anna Arresi Jazz Festival, Sardegna, Italy
- 2012 Arkitekturmuseet, Moderna Museet, Stockholm, Sweden (exhibition during Bucky Dome events)
- 2016 Moment – Moki Cherry, Moderna Museet, Stockholm, Sweden
- 2018 Air de Paris, Paris, France
- 2019 Ceramics & Collages, Kerry Schuss Gallery, NYC, USA
- 2019 Life & Art in Tågarp, curated by Naima Karlsson, Bjärnum, Sweden

=== Group exhibitions ===
- 1971 Utopier och visioner 1871–1981, Moderna Museet, Stockholm, Sweden
- 1977 The Loft, NYC, USA
- 1980 Music in Art, DC Space, Washington, USA
- 1983 Earworks, Grommet Gallery, NYC, USA
- 1985 EEK, RIAH & Art Café, NYC, USA
- 1985 Icon, Todd Capp, NYC, USA
- 1985 Micro Wave, Now Gallery, NYC, USA
- 1986 Fusion Art, 57 Stanton Street, NYC, USA
- 1986 Jazzart, Museum of Art, Gothenburg, Sweden
- 1986 Moving Installation, Freddy the Dreamer, NYC, USA
- 1986 Watermelon Show, Gallery Hirondelle, NYC, USA
- 1987 Animals, Todd Capp, NYC, USA
- 1996 Listening to Clay, Greenwich House Pottery, NYC, USA
- 2004 Tomarps Kungsgård, Kvidinge, Sweden
- 2006 Light My Ire Redux, Fusion Arts Museum, NYC, USA
- 2007 Galleri Persson, Malmö, Sweden
- 2008 Pool Art Fair, Chelsea Hotel, NYC, USA
- 2008 Tonie Roos, Moki Cherry, Susanne Beckman, Landskrona Konsthall, Landskrona, Sweden
- 2009 Galleri Kleerup, Stockholm, Sweden
- 2016 Ropen Skalla – Konsten åt Alla! (Heed the call – Art for all!), Malmö Konstmuseum, Malmö, Sweden
- 2016 Textila Undertexter, Marabouparken Konsthall, Stockholm, Sweden
- 2017 Textila Undertexter (Textile Subtexts), Malmö Konstmuseum, Malmö, Sweden
- 2018 Air de Paris at FIAC, Paris, France
- 2018 House of Fame, expanded retrospective convened by Linder Sterling, Nottingham Contemporary, Nottingham, UK
- 2018 Strange Attractors Vol. 2, curated by Bob Nickas, Kerry Schuss Gallery, NYC, USA
- 2019 A Seed's A Star, curated by Constance Tenvik, Loyal Gallery, Stockholm, Sweden

=== Productions ===
- 1966–1977 Organic Music tours & workshops with Don Cherry, Europe and USA
- 1967 Set design for premier of colour broadcasting, Television France, France
- 1969 Set design for TV show, Ankara, Turkey
- 1970 Opera with 100 students, Dartmouth College, New Hampshire, USA
- 1971 Design and production for Children's Television, Piff, Paff, Puff, TV 2, Stockholm, Sweden
- 1972 Elefantasi, Children's radio program with Don Cherry, Sveriges Radio, Sweden
- 1974 Atelier des Enfants (Children's Workshop) with Don Cherry, commissioned by Pontus Hultén, Centre Beaubourg, Paris, France
- 1978–85 Costumes and set design for children's theatre, Octopuss Theater, Tågarp, Sweden
- 1979 Atelier des Enfants, Centre Pompidou, Paris, France
- 1980 Costume design and construction, Man and Amanda, TV 2, Stockholm, Sweden
- 1981 Theatrical costume and set design, Lördags Godis, Sweden
- 1987 Costumes and set design, Ruby's Lives, Written and performed by Lanny Harrison, Gallery Theatre, Barnsdall Art Park, Los Angeles, USA
