= Symphony for Improvisers =

1967 album by Don Cherry

Studio album by Don Cherry
- Released: August 1967
- Recorded: September 19, 1966
- Studio: Van Gelder Studio, Englewood Cliffs, NJ
- Genre: Free jazz
- Length: 39:00
- Label: Blue Note; BST 84247
- Producer: Alfred Lion

Don Cherry chronology
Complete Communion (1965)	Symphony for Improvisers (1967)	Where is Brooklyn? (1969)

Symphony for Improvisers is an album by American jazz trumpeter Don Cherry, released by Blue Note Records in August 1967. It features Gato Barbieri, Henry Grimes, and Ed Blackwell, all of whom appeared on Cherry's previous album Complete Communion, along with Karl Berger, Jean-François Jenny-Clark, and Pharoah Sanders. Symphony for Improvisers was recorded in 1966. The front cover photograph was taken at New York Public Library for the Performing Arts, Upper West Side, New York City.

The tracks on Symphony for Improvisers were included in the compilation The Complete Blue Note Recordings of Don Cherry. In 2021, the Ezz-thetics label reissued Symphony For Improvisers along with Complete Communion on the compilation Complete Communion & Symphony For Improvisers Revisited.

== Reception ==
Professional ratings
Review scores
Source	Rating
AllMusic	4.5/5 stars
DownBeat	4/5 stars
The Penguin Guide to Jazz Recordings	3.5/4 stars

The AllMusic review by Steve Huey states: "Even though the album is full of passionate fireworks, there's also a great deal of subtlety — the flavors added to the ensemble by Berger's vibes and Sanders' piccolo, for example, or the way other instrumental voices often support and complement a solo statement. Feverish but well-channeled, this larger-group session is probably Cherry's most gratifying for Blue Note".

Ollie Bivens, writing for All About Jazz, commented: "Symphony for Improvisers is a lesson in controlled chaos that remains eminently musical... This music is cerebral without being cold, freewheeling without degenerating into a lot of blowing for the sake of blowing. Never boring, Symphony for Improvisers is for jazz fans with lengthy attention spans and open ears."

Ekkehard Jost wrote that Symphony for Improvisers and its predecessor Complete Communion are "among the most important LPs Don Cherry made, if not among the most important in free jazz of the Sixties." According to Jost, the central idea is that "monothematic pieces are dropped and several thematic complexes are integrated into a suite whose 'movements,' while clearly identifiable thanks to their contrasted thematic material, are linked with one another." Jost noted that, in relation to Complete Communion, Symphony for Improvisers "is more open in form, despite an almost identical construction. Transitions between the thematic sections are frequently fluid, as are the boundaries between composed material and improvisations. A great deal more time is spent on improvisations, as opposed to the themes, which become more and more fragmentary."

== Track listing ==
All compositions by Don Cherry

1. "Symphony for Improvisers: Symphony for Improvisers/Nu Creative Love/What's Not Serious?/Infant Happiness" - 19:43
2. "Manhattan Cry: Manhattan Cry/Lunatic/Sparkle Plenty/Om Nu" - 19:17

== Personnel ==
- Don Cherry – cornet
- Gato Barbieri – tenor saxophone
- Pharoah Sanders – tenor saxophone, piccolo
- Karl Berger – vibes, piano
- Henry Grimes – bass
- Jean-François Jenny-Clark – bass
- Ed Blackwell – drums
