= Complete Communion =

Studio album by Don Cherry
- Released: May 1966
- Recorded: December 24, 1965
- Studio: Van Gelder Studio, Englewood Cliffs, NJ
- Genre: Free jazz, avant-garde jazz
- Length: 40:14
- Label: Blue Note; BST 84226
- Producer: Alfred Lion

Don Cherry chronology
Complete Communion (1966)	Symphony for Improvisers (1966)

Complete Communion is a 1966 album by American jazz composer Don Cherry, his debut as a bandleader and his first release on Blue Note Records.

Each side of the original LP were suites, side-long compositions working with several themes. Critics have proposed this recording as an important innovation in the free jazz of the time, introducing "an alternative both to athematic improvising and to monothematic pieces".

The tracks on Complete Communion were included in the compilation The Complete Blue Note Recordings of Don Cherry. In 2021, the Ezz-thetics label reissued Complete Communion along with Symphony For Improvisers on the compilation Complete Communion & Symphony For Improvisers Revisited.

== Reception ==
Professional ratings
Review scores
Source	Rating
AllMusic	4.5/5 stars
DownBeat	3/5 stars
The Encyclopedia of Popular Music	4/5 stars
MusicHound Jazz	5/5
The Penguin Guide to Jazz	3/4 stars
The Rolling Stone Jazz Record Guide	5/5 stars

In a review for AllMusic, Steve Huey wrote the music had clear origins in Cherry's time with saxophone player Ornette Coleman, but "...Cherry injected enough of his own personality to begin differentiating himself as a leader... every member of the group not only solos, but shares the total space selflessly. Bassist Henry Grimes and drummer Ed Blackwell both play extremely active roles, especially Grimes, who solos powerfully and sometimes carries the main riffs. Often the music sounds more like a conversation, as opposed to a solo with support, because the musicians make such intelligent use of space and dynamics, and wind up with a great deal of crackling, volatile interplay as a result. The leader remains recognizably himself, and his burnished tone is a nice contrast with Barbieri's fiery approach... As a whole, the project comes off remarkably well, establishing Cherry as an avant-garde force to be reckoned with in his own right."

The authors of The Penguin Guide to Jazz commented: "The aim... is to give each member of the group an equal role in the improvising process, to let the simple thematic material roll round the ensemble in the freest way. It is, as yet, an experimental aesthetic, which accounts for the raw immediacy of the set... Barbieri, whom Cherry met during their respective Italian sojourns, is at his most unfettered and Ayler-like, vocalizing intensely through the horn and producing chordal effects when the horns are in unison. Grimes was poorly audible on the original LP but he comes through strongly on the reissues and one tends to listen to him now, knowing how extraordinary his future story was."

Ekkehard Jost wrote that Complete Communion and the follow-up album Symphony for Improvisers are "among the most important LPs Don Cherry made, if not among the most important in free jazz of the Sixties." According to Jost, the central idea is that "monothematic pieces are dropped and several thematic complexes are integrated into a suite whose 'movements,' while clearly identifiable thanks to their contrasted thematic material, are linked with one another." Jost commented:

The first impression one gets in listening to Complete Communion is of ensemble precision achieved in an utterly unpedantic way. The transitions, for example, are relatively complicated: various musical figures are linked together; there are no schematic patterns; and yet the transitions are accomplished with astonishing ease, as though they were the most natural thing in the world. The reason is without question the rapport between Cherry and Barbieri, gained in months of playing together. Both of them know the thematic and motivic material of Communion so well that they can do what they want with it without having to agree on things first, and each can be sure that the other will immediately go along with his ideas. Added to this is a veritably somnambulistic empathy between Henry Grimes and Ed Blackwell, who not only produce a stable rhythmic foundation, but - more important - react quickly and accurately to changes in direction taken by the horns... This precision of ensembles - together with a concise disposition of thematic material and relatively short solos - gives Complete Communion a transparent structure, in which the individual formal complexes stand out sharply.

== Influence ==
On the DKV Trio album Live in Wels & Chicago, 1998, the group interprets the entire "Complete Communion" suite.

In 2001, horn player Tom Varner released the album Second Communion (Omnitone), consisting of new arrangements of Cherry's compositions. Varner recalled the impact of Cherry's recording: "Fall 1977, Boston. I'm a transfer student at New England Conservatory. My buddy, baritone-sax-player Jim Hartog, played me Complete Communion. It blew me away. It swung, and was abstract, focused, fresh, full of humour and life, joy and great beauty. It gave me direction in my life, as an improvising 'weird' brass-player. Thank you, Don Cherry!"

In 2006, a Norwegian trio featuring Atle Nymo on saxophone, Ingebrigt Håker Flaten on bass, and Håkon M. Johansen on drums released an album titled Complete Communion (Bolage) featuring re-workings of the original tracks.

In 2010, drummer Aldo Romano released Complete Communion To Don Cherry (BMG / Dreyfus) with saxophonist Géraldine Laurent, trumpeter Fabrizio Bosso, and bassist Henri Texier.

== Track listing ==
All compositions by Don Cherry

1. "Complete Communion: Complete Communion/And Now/Golden Heart/Remembrance" – 20:38
2. "Elephantasy: Elephantasy/Our Feelings/Bishmallah/Wind, Sand And Stars" – 19:36

== Personnel ==
- Don Cherry - cornet
- Leandro "Gato" Barbieri - tenor saxophone
- Henry Grimes - bass
- Edward Blackwell - drums

Technical

- Alfred Lion - producer
- Rudy Van Gelder - recording
