= Ornette Coleman discography =

Discography for American jazz saxophonist Ornette Coleman.

== As bandleader ==
=== Studio albums ===
- 1958: Something Else!!!! (Contemporary, 1958)
- 1959: Tomorrow Is the Question! (Contemporary, 1959)
- 1959: The Shape of Jazz to Come (Atlantic, 1959)
- 1959: Change of the Century (Atlantic, 1960)
- 1960: This Is Our Music (Atlantic, 1961)
- 1960: Free Jazz (Atlantic, 1961)
- 1961: Ornette! (Atlantic, 1962)
- 1961: Ornette on Tenor (Atlantic, 1962)
- 1965: Chappaqua Suite (Columbia, 1966)
- 1966: The Empty Foxhole (Blue Note, 1966)
- 1968: New York Is Now! (Blue Note, 1968)
- 1968: Love Call (Blue Note, 1971)
- 1971: Science Fiction (Columbia, 1972)
- 1972: Skies of America (Columbia, 1972)
- 1973-75: Dancing in Your Head (A&M, 1977)
- 1977: Soapsuds, Soapsuds (Artists House, 1977)
- 1976: Body Meta (Artists House, 1978)
- 1979: Of Human Feelings (Antilles, 1982)
- 1985: Song X (Geffen, 1986)
- 1987: In All Languages (Caravan of Dreams, 1987)
- 1988: Virgin Beauty (Portrait, 1988)
- 1992: Naked Lunch with Howard Shore, The London Philharmonic Orchestra (Milan, 1992) – soundtrack
- 1995: Tone Dialing (Harmolodic/Verve, 1995)
- 1996: Sound Museum: Hidden Man (Harmolodic/Verve, 1996)
- 1996: Sound Museum: Three Women (Harmolodic/Verve, 1996)

=== Live albums ===
- 1962: Town Hall, 1962 (ESP Disk, 1965)
- 1965: At the "Golden Circle", Vol. 1 & 2 (Blue Note, 1966)
- 1965: An Evening with Ornette Coleman (Polydor International, 1967)
- 1967: The Music of Ornette Coleman - Forms & Sounds (RCA Victor, 1967)
- 1968: Ornette at 12 (Impulse!, 1968)
- 1968: The Love Revolution (Gambit, 2005) – music previously issued on Live In Milano 1968 and The Unprecedented Music of Ornette Coleman
- 1970: Friends and Neighbors: Live at Prince Street (Flying Dutchman, 1972)
- 1970: Crisis (Impulse!, 1972)
- 1971: Live in Paris 1971 (Jazz Row, 2007)
- 1971: The Belgrade Concert (Jazz Door, 1995)
- 1985: Opening the Caravan of Dreams (Caravan of Dreams, 1985)
- 1985: Prime Design/Time Design (Caravan of Dreams, 1985)
- 1988: Jazzbühne Berlin '88 (Repertoire, 1990)
- 1996: Colors: Live from Leipzig (Harmolodic/Verve, 1997)
- 2005: Sound Grammar (Sound Grammar, 2006)
- 2009: New Vocabulary (System Dialing, 2014)

=== Compilations ===
- The Art of the Improvisers (Atlantic, 1970) – rec. 1959-61
- Twins (Atlantic, 1971) – rec. 1959-61
- To Whom Who Keeps a Record (Atlantic, 1975) – rec. 1959-60
- Who's Crazy? Vol. 1 & 2 (Atmosphere, 1979) – rec. 1966
- Broken Shadows (Columbia, 1982) – rec. 1971
- Beauty Is a Rare Thing (Rhino/Atlantic, 1995)
- The Complete Science Fiction Sessions (Columbia, 2000)
- The Ornette Coleman Legacy (Atlantic, 2018) – rec. 1960-61

== As sideman ==
With Paul Bley

- 1958: Live at the Hilcrest Club 1958 (Inner City, 1976)
- 1958: Coleman Classics Volume 1 (Improvising Artists, 1977)

With Charlie Haden

- 1976: Closeness (Horizon, 1976)
- 1976: The Golden Number (A&M, 1977)

With Jamaaladeen Tacuma

- 1983–84: Renaissance Man (Gramavision, 1984)
- 2010: For the Love of Ornette (Jazzwerkstatt, 2010)

With others

- Geri Allen, Eyes in the Back of Your Head (Blue Note, 1997)
- Louis Armstrong, Louis Armstrong and His Friends (Flying Dutchman/Amsterdam, 1970)
- Joe Henry, Scar (Mammoth, 2001)
- Jackie McLean, New and Old Gospel (Blue Note, 1968) – rec. 1967
- Yoko Ono, Yoko Ono/Plastic Ono Band on the track "AOS" (Apple, 1970)
- Lou Reed, The Raven (RCA, 2003)
- Gunther Schuller, Jazz Abstractions (Atlantic, 1960)
- Bob Thiele, Head Start (Flying Dutchman, 1967)
- James Blood Ulmer, Tales of Captain Black (Artists House, 1978)
- Sonny Rollins, Road Shows, Vol. 2 (Doxy, 2011)
