= Beauty Is a Rare Thing =

Box set by Ornette Coleman
- Released: November 16, 1993
- Recorded: May 22, 1959 – March 27, 1961
- Studio: Radio Recorders (LA); Atlantic (NYC); A & R (NYC)
- Genre: Jazz
- Length: 7:04:09
- Label: Rhino Records
- Producer: Yves Beauvais

Beauty Is a Rare Thing: The Complete Atlantic Recordings is a box set by American jazz saxophonist and composer Ornette Coleman compiling his master recordings made for Atlantic between 1959 and 1961, released on Rhino Records on November 16, 1993.

== Background ==
Prior to signing with Atlantic in 1959, Coleman and his group had recorded Something Else!!!! and Tomorrow Is the Question! for the Los Angeles-based label Contemporary Records. Coleman had not been completely pleased with either, and he found audiences dwindling at the Hillcrest Club (not the Hillcrest Country Club) in Los Angeles where he played regularly. However, one evening, pianist John Lewis of the Modern Jazz Quartet saw the Coleman group and immediately became an evangelist for Ornette's new approach, securing Coleman both a summer residency at the Tanglewood Music Center and a recording contract with the MJQ's label, Atlantic, through the label's executive in charge of jazz, Nesuhi Ertegun.

Recording sessions took place at Radio Recorders in Los Angeles on May 22, and October 8 and 9, 1959, at Atlantic Studios in New York City on July 19 and 26, and August 2, 1960, and January 31, and March 22 and 27, 1961, and at A&R Studios in New York on December 19, 20 and 21, 1960. The producer of the original recording sessions was Nesuhi Ertegun.

== Content ==
The box presents the material in chronological recording order. The set includes the total tracks from all six of his Atlantic albums, The Shape of Jazz to Come (October 1959), Change of the Century (June 1960), This Is Our Music (February 1961), Free Jazz (September 1961), Ornette! (February 1962), and Ornette on Tenor (December 1962), as well as the later compilations The Art of the Improvisers (November 1970), Twins (October 1971), and the Japan-only To Whom Who Keeps A Record (1975). Two additional tracks were released on the Gunther Schuller album John Lewis Presents Contemporary Music: Jazz Abstractions – Compositions by Gunther Schuller and Jim Hall of 1961, and six previously unreleased performances appear here for the first time. The insert booklet contains text by Robert Palmer, forewords by Coleman and trumpeter Don Cherry, as well as various quotes of reaction to Coleman's music by Paul Bley, Miles Davis, Roy Eldridge, Gil Evans, Maynard Ferguson, Dizzy Gillespie, Charlie Haden, Herbie Hancock, Joe Henderson, John Lewis, Shelly Manne, Jackie McLean, Charles Mingus, and Thelonious Monk.

== Reception ==
Professional ratings
Review scores
Source	Rating
AllMusic	5/5 stars
The Penguin Guide to Jazz	👑

The AllMusic review by Thom Jurek states that "this is, along with John Coltrane's Atlantic set and the Miles and Coltrane box, one of the most essential jazz CD purchases".

The Penguin Guide to Jazz in all editions prior to its ninth awarded the set one of its rare crown accolades.

== Track listing ==
All tracks are written by Ornette Coleman, except as noted.

Disc one
No.	Title	Original release	Length
1.	"Focus on Sanity"	The Shape of Jazz to Come	6:49
2.	"Chronology"	The Shape of Jazz to Come	6:04
3.	"Peace"	The Shape of Jazz to Come	9:02
4.	"Congeniality"	The Shape of Jazz to Come	6:44
5.	"Lonely Woman"	The Shape of Jazz to Come	4:57
6.	"Monk and the Nun"	Twins	5:53
7.	"Just for You"	The Art of the Improvisers	3:51
8.	"Eventually"	The Shape of Jazz to Come	4:20
9.	"Una Muy Bonita"	Change of the Century	5:59
10.	"Bird Food"	Change of the Century	5:28
11.	"Change of the Century"	Change of the Century	4:41
12.	"Music Always"	To Whom Who Keeps a Record	5:29

Disc two
No.	Title	Original release	Length
1.	"The Face of the Bass"	Change of the Century	6:55
2.	"Forerunner"	Change of the Century	5:13
3.	"Free"	Change of the Century	6:20
4.	"The Circle with a Hole in the Middle"	The Art of the Improvisers	4:52
5.	"Ramblin'"	Change of the Century	6:35
6.	"Little Symphony"	Twins	5:14
7.	"The Tribes of New York"	previously unreleased	4:33
8.	"Kaleidoscope"	This Is Our Music	6:34
9.	"Rise and Shine"	previously unreleased	6:11
10.	"Mr. and Mrs. People"	previously unreleased	4:40
11.	"Blues Connotation"	This Is Our Music	5:17
12.	"I Heard It Over the Radio"	previously unreleased	6:24

Disc three
No.	Title	Writer(s)	Original release	Length
1.	"P.S. Unless One Has (Blues Connotation No. 2)"		To Whom Who Keeps a Record	5:53
2.	"Revolving Doors"		previously unreleased	4:26
3.	"Brings Goodness"		To Whom Who Keeps a Record	6:38
4.	"Joy of A Toy"		Twins	4:55
5.	"To Us"		To Whom Who Keeps a Record	4:32
6.	"Humpty Dumpty"		This Is Our Music	5:21
7.	"The Fifth of Beethoven"		The Art of the Improvisers	6:37
8.	"Motive for Its Use"		To Whom Who Keeps a Record	5:39
9.	"Moon Inhabitants"		The Art of the Improvisers	4:31
10.	"The Legend of Bebop"		The Art of the Improvisers	7:15
11.	"Some Other"		To Whom Who Keeps a Record	7:20
12.	"Embraceable You"	George Gershwin; Ira Gershwin	This Is Our Music	4:55
13.	"All"		To Whom Who Keeps a Record	4:30

Disc four
No.	Title	Original release	Length
1.	"Folk Tale"	This Is Our Music	4:47
2.	"Poise"	This Is Our Music	4:37
3.	"Beauty Is a Rare Thing"	This Is Our Music	7:13
4.	"First Take"	Twins	17:03
5.	"Free Jazz"	Free Jazz	37:03

Disc five
No.	Title	Original release	Length
1.	"Proof Readers"	previously unreleased	10:25
2.	"W.R.U."	Ornette!	16:24
3.	"Check Up"	Twins	10:10
4.	"T & T"	Ornette!	4:35
5.	"C & D"	Ornette!	13:10
6.	"R.P.D.D."	Ornette!	9:38
7.	"The Alchemy of Scott LaFaro"	The Art of the Improvisers	9:50

Disc six
No.	Title	Writer(s)	Original release	Length
1.	"EOS"		Ornette on Tenor	6:35
2.	"Enfant"		Ornette on Tenor	6:26
3.	"Ecars"		Ornette on Tenor	7:35
4.	"Cross Breeding"		Ornette on Tenor	11:17
5.	"Harlem's Manhattan"		The Art of the Improvisers	8:10
6.	"Mapa"		Ornette on Tenor	9:05
7.	"Abstraction"	Gunther Schuller	Jazz Abstractions	4:07
8.	"Variants on a Theme of Thelonious Monk (Criss Cross)"	Schuller	Jazz Abstractions	15:22

=== Notes ===
- Beauty Is a Rare Thing was reissued in March 2015.

== Personnel ==
- Ornette Coleman — alto saxophone, tenor saxophone
- Don Cherry — pocket trumpet, cornet discs one to five, and disc six tracks 1–6
- Charlie Haden — bass discs one to four
- Scott LaFaro — bass disc four tracks 4 & 5, disc five, and disc six tracks 7 & 8
- Jimmy Garrison — bass disc six tracks 1–6
- Billy Higgins — drums disc one, disc two tracks 1–5, and disc four tracks 4 & 5
- Ed Blackwell — drums disc two tracks 6–12, discs three to five, and disc six tracks 1–6

=== Additional personnel ===
- Freddie Hubbard — trumpet disc four tracks 4 & 5
- Eric Dolphy — bass clarinet disc four tracks 4 & 5; alto saxophone, bass clarinet, flute disc six track 8
- Charles Libove, Roland Vamos — violins disc six tracks 7 & 8
- Harry Zaratzian — viola disc six tracks 7 & 8
- Joseph Tekula — cello disc six tracks 7 & 8
- Robert DiDomenica — flute disc six track 8
- Eddie Costa — vibraphone disc six track 8
- Bill Evans — piano disc six track 8
- Jim Hall — guitar disc six tracks 7 & 8
- Alvin Brehm — bass disc six track 7
- George Duvivier — bass disc six track 8
- Sticks Evans — drums disc six tracks 7 & 8
- Gunther Schuller — arranger, conductor disc six tracks 7 & 8
