= The Art of the Improvisers =

Studio album by Ornette Coleman
- Released: November 2, 1970
- Recorded: May 22 and October 9, 1959; July 26, 1960; January 31 and March 27, 1961
- Genre: Jazz
- Length: 45:18
- Label: Atlantic 1572
- Producer: Nesuhi Ertegun

Ornette Coleman chronology
Crisis (1969)	The Art of the Improvisers (1970)	Twins (1971)

The Art of the Improvisers is an album credited to jazz composer and saxophonist Ornette Coleman, released by Atlantic Records in 1970. The album was assembled without Coleman's input, comprising outtakes from recording sessions of 1959 to 1961 for The Shape of Jazz to Come, Change of the Century, This Is Our Music, Ornette!, and Ornette on Tenor. Recording sessions in 1959 took place at Radio Recorders in Hollywood, California; those in 1960 and 1961 at Atlantic Studios in New York City.

== Reception ==
Professional ratings
Review scores
Source	Rating
AllMusic	4.5/5 stars
DownBeat	5/5 stars
The Penguin Guide to Jazz Recordings	3/4 stars
The Rolling Stone Album Guide	4/5 stars

Thom Jurek, writing in AllMusic, characterized the album as "basically one of Coleman's most uptempo records for Atlantic, but also one of his most soulful. It deserves serious re-evaluation".

== Track listing ==
All compositions by Ornette Coleman.

=== Side one ===
No.	Title	Date	Length
1.	"The Circle with a Hole in the Middle"	October 9, 1959	4:54
2.	"Just for You"	May 22, 1959	3:53
3.	"The Fifth of Beethoven"	July 26, 1960	6:39
4.	"The Alchemy of Scott LaFaro"	January 31, 1961	9:52

=== Side two ===
No.	Title	Date	Length
1.	"Moon Inhabitants"	July 26, 1960	4:33
2.	"The Legend of Bebop"	July 26, 1960	7:18
3.	"Harlem's Manhattan"	March 27, 1961	8:09

== Personnel ==
- Ornette Coleman — alto saxophone; tenor saxophone on "Harlem's Manhattan"
- Don Cherry — pocket trumpet; cornet on "Just for You"
- Charlie Haden — bass on 1959 and 1960 tracks
- Scott LaFaro — bass on "The Alchemy of Scott LaFaro"
- Jimmy Garrison — bass on "Harlem's Manhattan"
- Billy Higgins — drums on 1959 tracks
- Ed Blackwell — drums on 1960 and 1961 tracks
