= To Whom Who Keeps a Record =

Studio album by Ornette Coleman
- Released: 1975
- Recorded: October 8, 1959; July 19 and 26, 1960
- Studio: Radio Recorders, Hollywood; Atlantic Studios, New York City
- Genre: Jazz
- Length: 40:17
- Label: Warner Pioneer
- Producer: Nesuhi Ertegun

Ornette Coleman chronology
Skies of America (1972)	To Whom Who Keeps a Record (1975)	Dancing in Your Head (1977)

To Whom Who Keeps a Record is an album credited to jazz composer and saxophonist Ornette Coleman, originally released by the Japanese subsidiary Warner Pioneer of Warner Bros. Records in late 1975. The album, which was assembled by producer İlhan Mimaroğlu without Coleman's input, comprises outtakes from Atlantic Records recording sessions of 1959 and 1960 for Change of the Century and This Is Our Music. Sessions for "Music Always" took place at Radio Recorders in Hollywood, California with Billy Higgins on drums; all others took place at Atlantic Studios in New York City with drummer Ed Blackwell. (Blackwell replaced Higgins shortly before the Coleman group's 1960 engagement at the Five Spot Café after Higgins encountered cabaret card difficulties in New York.)

The album was reissued by Water Music Records in 2006 and by Superior Viaduct in 2016. The contents of the album also appear on the 1993 compilation Beauty Is a Rare Thing as well as the 2018 compilation The Atlantic Years.

The track titles spell out "music always brings goodness to us all, p.s. unless one has some other motive for its use."

== Reception ==
Professional ratings
Review scores
Source	Rating
The Rolling Stone Jazz Record Guide	5/5 stars

In a review for All About Jazz, Kurt Gottschalk wrote: "this collection is hardly the mismatched-socks drawer that so many 'rarities' collections are. Nor is it an epiphany. It casts no unexpected light on the man, the aesthetic or the times. It is simply another great record... It stands up to Coleman's other work of the time, which means it stands up to the greatest records in the jazz canon. What more could be said?" David Was, in an article for NPR Music, commented that the recordings "sound as fresh and startling today as they must have in 1959 and '60, when they were recorded." Writing for The Austin Chronicle, Jay Trachtenberg called the album "marvelous," and remarked: "Upon its release, this disturbing and challenging 'free jazz' jolted the jazz establishment to its core. Almost 50 years later, the musical world has finally caught up with once jarring tunes like 'To Us' and 'Motive for Its Use,' which now sound practically mainstream... This is the music that started it all."

== Track listing ==
All compositions by Ornette Coleman.

=== Side one ===
No.	Title	Date	Length
1.	"Music Always"	October 8, 1959	5:31
2.	"Brings Goodness"	July 26, 1960	6:39
3.	"To Us"	July 26, 1960	4:36
4.	"All"	July 26, 1960	4:32

=== Side two ===
No.	Title	Date	Length
1.	"P.S. Unless One Has (Blues Connotation No. 2)"	July 19, 1960	5:55
2.	"Some Other"	July 26, 1960	7:23
3.	"Motive for Its Use"	July 26, 1960	5:41

== Personnel ==
- Ornette Coleman — alto saxophone
- Don Cherry — pocket trumpet
- Charlie Haden — bass
- Billy Higgins — drums (1)
- Ed Blackwell — drums (2-7)
