= Love Revolution =

Love Revolution may refer to:

== Albums ==
- Love Revolution, a 1997 album by NewSong, or its title track
- Love Revolution (Fabrice Morvan album), 2003, or the title track
- Love Revolution (Natalie Grant album), 2010, or the title track
- The Love Revolution (Ornette Coleman album), 2005

== Songs ==
- "Love Revolution", song by Lenny Kravitz from It Is Time for a Love Revolution
- "Love Revolution", song by Army of Lovers from Disco Extravaganza
- "Love Revolution" (Will Young song), 2015
- "Love Revolution" (Phixx song), 2004
- "Love Revolution", song by Bitter:Sweet from Drama, 2008

== Other uses ==
- Love Revolution (web series), South Korean drama web series, 2020
- Love Revolution (TV drama), a Japanese drama series that aired in 2001 featuring Makiko Esumi
- Love Revolution (TV series), Thai romantic drama series that aired in 2020
