= The Avant-Garde (album) =

Studio album by John Coltrane and Don Cherry
- Released: April 1966
- Recorded: June 28, 1960; July 8, 1960
- Studios: Atlantic Studios, New York City
- Genres: Free jazz; avant-garde jazz
- Length: 36:15
- Label: Atlantic
- Producer: Nesuhi Ertegün

John Coltrane chronology
New Thing at Newport (1966)	The Avant-Garde (1966)	Meditations (1966)

Alternative Cover

Professional ratings
Review scores
Source	Rating
Allmusic	4/5 stars
DownBeat	4.5/5 stars
The Penguin Guide to Jazz	3/4 stars

The Avant-Garde is an album credited to jazz musicians John Coltrane and Don Cherry that was released in 1966 by Atlantic Records. It features Coltrane playing several compositions by Ornette Coleman accompanied by the members of Coleman's quartet: Cherry, Charlie Haden, and Ed Blackwell. The album was assembled from two unissued recording sessions at Atlantic Studios in New York City in 1960.

== Background ==
Ornette Coleman attended the Lenox School of Jazz in 1959 with Don Cherry. His education was sponsored by Atlantic Records. Coleman had a revolutionary sound that deviated from conventional jazz, apparent by the lack of fixed harmonic patterns. Despite his deviations, Coleman retained the basic key and common time of traditional jazz. In 1953, he met drummer Ed Blackwell, who is featured on the album.

John Coltrane studied with Coleman, and they frequently played together but never made an album together. The Avant-Garde is a result of their mutual respect and friendship. Coltrane, Coleman, and Cherry played together in ensembles as they explored new ways of playing jazz. With this album Coltrane contributed to the formation of free jazz through his "modal school of improvisation". "The Blessing" is the first time he recorded on soprano saxophone.

== Track background ==
"Focus on Sanity" was first recorded in Los Angeles, California, on May 2, 1959. "Cherryco" was recorded in 1960 under the title "Untitled Opus #1". The title was considered a play on words with the name "Cherokee", though the style of the song has nothing to do with the name. Some of the tapes are missing from the song and "are presumed lost".

"The Invisible" was first performed and recorded for Coleman's album Something Else!!!! which was released in 1958. According to Claire O'Neal, author of Ornette Coleman, this song "pokes fun at traditional musical structure, featuring a tonal center that hides from the listener".

"The Blessing" was another piece that appeared on Something Else!!!! Reviewer Chris Kesley calls Coltrane's approach to the tune "restrained".

== Analysis ==
The Avant-Garde is one of seven albums that Coltrane recorded for Atlantic between 1959 and 1962. The free jazz style of the album was considered controversial and "lacking the necessary discipline to represent America's art form." This new jazz composition by Coleman features surprising rhythmic accents, asymmetrical melodic phrases, and the incorporation of brass instruments and drums into the melody of the song. A notable feature of this album is its lack of pianist and usage of wind instruments to carry each piece.

On "Focus on Sanity", Cherry and Coltrane complement each other with contrasting sound as Coltrane "leaps into [the music] like a man possessed, while Cherry answers with a feathery tone."

== Reception ==
In a review for AllMusic, Lindsay Planer wrote: "Coltrane's integration into this band works with some extraordinarily fresh results. Neither Cherry nor Coltrane makes any radical departures on this album; however, it's the ability of each to complement the other both in terms of modal style and -- perhaps more importantly -- texture that lends heavily to the success of these sides. Cherry's brisk and somewhat nasal intonations on 'The Blessing' mimic those of Miles Davis, albeit with shorter flourishes and heavily improvised lines. When combined with Coltrane's well-placed -- if not somewhat reserved -- solos, the mutual value of both is dramatically increased. Blackwell -- the only other musician besides Cherry and Coltrane to be featured on every track -- provides some non-conventional percussive accompaniment. His contributions to 'The Blessing' and workout on the aptly titled 'Focus on Sanity' are primal."

Writing for the BBC, Peter Marsh suggested that Coltrane was "not entirely at home with Coleman or Cherry's vision", and stated: "The trumpeter is predictably mercurial, firing off staccato bursts of melody that change horses in midstream; his solos are kept short, while the saxophonist was (later at least) famed for his marathon improvisations. Still, Coltrane goes for brevity in keeping with the spirit of the music, and on soprano manages the kind of conversational playing that Cherry demonstrates so well. However, it's telling that Coltrane's best work is reserved for the closing 'Bemsha Swing' (an album of Monk tunes may have been a better bet for this band)... there are no alternate takes or lost treasures on this re-issue and, while it's an undoubted necessity for the Coltrane collector, it may not be essential for the rest of us."

Phil Freeman, in an article for Burning Ambulance, commented "Throughout the album, Coltrane is willing to be Cherry's equal, never swamping the trumpeter under waves of notes (as he surely could have done) or blasting him flat with raw power. Coltrane in 1960 was still very much under the sway of Prestige jam-session rules, wherein solo statements were made in a form as strictly organized as a university debate. You don't play over the other man, you let him say his piece and then you say yours, or the two of you blow through the melody. It's not a fight, it's an attempt to spontaneously create a piece of music that sounds formally organized. Ornette's band was toying with these rules, subtly subverting them, and that wasn’t Coltrane's thing, not yet, but he wanted to dip a toe in nevertheless. And after doing so..., he brings the band around to his way of thinking with a version of 'Bemsha Swing,' a tune he'd probably played dozens of times with Monk himself, three years earlier. I've done your thing, he seems to say, now you do this thing with me. And Cherry and Blackwell join in quite happily as Coltrane and Heath lurch and swing through a piece by the previous decade's (and indeed the decade before that, too) impenetrable avant-garde genius."

== Track listing ==
=== Side one ===
No.	Title	Writer(s)	Length
1.	"Cherryco"	Don Cherry	6:47
2.	"Focus on Sanity"	Ornette Coleman	12:15
Total length:			19:02

=== Side two ===
No.	Title	Writer(s)	Length
1.	"The Blessing"	Ornette Coleman	7:53
2.	"The Invisible"	Ornette Coleman	4:15
3.	"Bemsha Swing"	Thelonious Monk, Denzil Best	5:05
Total length:			17:13 36:15

== Personnel ==
- John Coltrane – tenor and soprano saxophone
- Don Cherry – cornet
- Charlie Haden – double bass (tracks 1:1, 2:1)
- Percy Heath – double bass (tracks 1:2, 2:2, 2:3)
- Ed Blackwell – drums
