= Broadway Blues =

Broadway Blues may refer to:

- Broadway Blues (Coleman), a 1968 free jazz composition by Ornette Coleman
- Broadway Blues (Swanstrom and Morgan), a hit song of 1920 with lyrics by Arthur Swanstrom and music by Carey Morgan

== See also ==
- Broadway-Blues-Ballads
- Blues on Broadway
