= Twins (Ornette Coleman album) =

Studio album by Ornette Coleman
- Released: October 4, 1971
- Recorded: May 22, 1959; July 19 and 26, 1960; December 21, 1960; January 31, 1961
- Genre: Free jazz; avant-garde jazz
- Length: 42:35
- Label: Atlantic 1588
- Producer: Nesuhi Ertegün

Ornette Coleman chronology
The Art of the Improvisers (1970)	Twins (1971)	Science Fiction (1972)

Professional ratings
Review scores
Source	Rating
DownBeat	5/5 stars
The Penguin Guide to Jazz	3/4 stars
The Rolling Stone Jazz Record Guide	4/5 stars

Twins is an album credited to jazz composer and saxophonist Ornette Coleman, released by Atlantic Records in 1971. The album was assembled without Coleman's input, comprising outtakes from recording sessions of 1959 to 1961 for The Shape of Jazz to Come, This Is Our Music, Free Jazz: A Collective Improvisation, and Ornette! Sessions for "Monk and the Nun" took place at Radio Recorders in Hollywood, California; for "First Take" at A&R Studios in New York City, and all others at Atlantic Studios also in Manhattan. The track "First Take" was a first attempt at "Free Jazz" from the album of the same name.

== Track listing ==
All compositions by Ornette Coleman.

Side one
No.	Title	Date	Length
1.	"First Take"	December 21, 1960	17:00
2.	"Little Symphony"	July 19, 1960	5:15

Side two
No.	Title	Date	Length
1.	"Monk and the Nun"	May 22, 1959	5:35
2.	"Check Up"	January 31, 1961	10:10
3.	"Joy of a Toy"	July 26, 1960	4:35

== Personnel ==
- Ornette Coleman – alto saxophone
- Don Cherry – pocket trumpet; cornet on "Monk and the Nun"
- Charlie Haden – bass on 1959 and 1960 tracks
- Scott LaFaro – bass on "First Take" and "Check Up"
- Billy Higgins – drums on "First Take" and "Monk and the Nun"
- Ed Blackwell – drums on 1960 and 1961 tracks
- Freddie Hubbard – trumpet on "First Take"
- Eric Dolphy – bass clarinet on "First Take"
