= Ornette on Tenor =

Studio album by Ornette Coleman
- Released: December 1962
- Recorded: March 22 & 27, 1961
- Studio: Atlantic Studios, New York City
- Genre: Jazz
- Length: 40:58
- Label: Atlantic
- Producer: Nesuhi Ertegun

Ornette Coleman chronology
Ornette! (1962)	Ornette on Tenor (1962)	Town Hall, 1962 (1965)

Ornette on Tenor is the eighth album by the American jazz composer and saxophonist Ornette Coleman, released in 1962 on Atlantic Records, his sixth and final one for the label. It features Coleman playing tenor saxophone rather than his usual alto, and bassist Jimmy Garrison before he joined the John Coltrane Quartet. This would be the last record by the Coleman Quartet started in the 1950s; he would disband this group and form the Coleman Trio later in the year. Recording sessions took place on March 22 and 27, 1961, at Atlantic Studios in New York City. One outtake from the March 27 session, "Harlem's Manhattan," would appear on the 1970 compilation The Art of the Improvisers.

== Reception ==
Professional ratings
Review scores
Source	Rating
Down Beat	5/5 stars
AllMusic	3.5/5 stars
The Penguin Guide to Jazz Recordings	3.5/4 stars

Down Beat magazine critic Harvey Pekar said of the album in his five-star review of January 3, 1963: "Coleman has scored another major success with this album. Most of the space is devoted to improvisation, but there are also several provocative compositions."

The Allmusic review by Steve Huey awarded the album 3½ stars, stating: "it's probably his least stunning Atlantic, not quite as revolutionary or memorable as many of its predecessors, but still far ahead of its time ... it's hard not to be a little disappointed that Ornette on Tenor doesn't have the boundary-shattering impact of his previous work—but then again, it's probably asking too much to expect a revolution every time out."

== Track listing ==
All compositions by Ornette Coleman.

=== Side one ===
No.	Title	Date	Length
1.	"Cross Breeding"	March 27	11:17
2.	"Mapa"	March 27	9:05

=== Side two ===
No.	Title	Date	Length
1.	"Enfant"	March 27	6:27
2.	"Eos"	March 22	6:35
3.	"Ecars"	March 27	7:34

== Personnel ==
- Ornette Coleman — tenor saxophone
- Don Cherry — pocket trumpet
- Jimmy Garrison — bass
- Ed Blackwell — drums
