= American bass viol =

Bowed string instrument

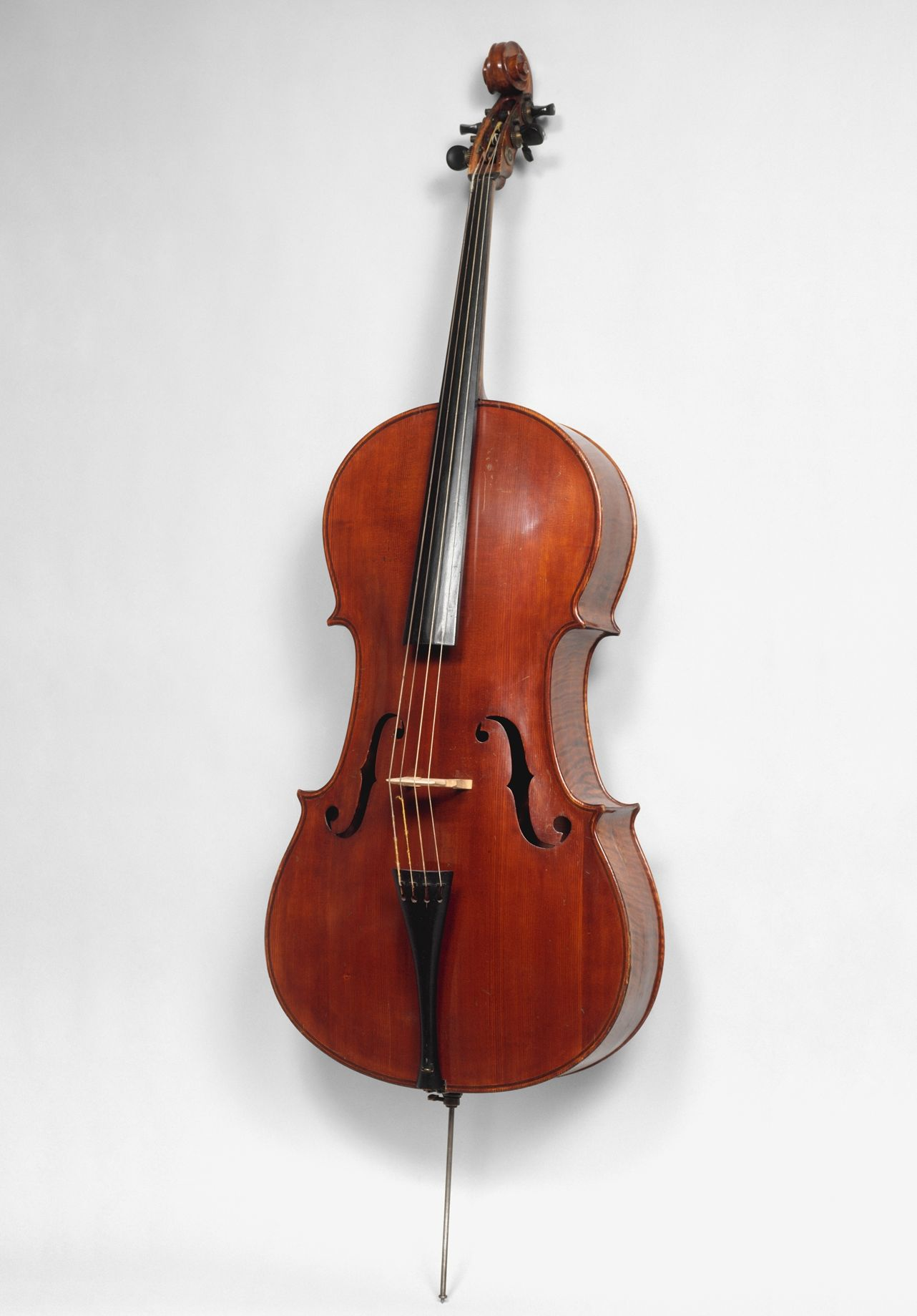
1861 Yankee Bass Viol in the Metropolitan Museum of Art

The American bass viol, also called a church bass or Yankee bass viol, is a type of bowed string instrument which enjoyed popularity in early 19th century New England for use in aiding Puritan congregational singers. In its time of common use, the instrument was referred to as a bass viol, despite the fact that it more closely resembles a large cello than a bass viola da gamba (also known as a bass viol). The size and form of these instruments varies; many are uniquely proportioned folk instruments.

The earliest dated example of a church bass is from the maker Benjamin Crehore, made in Massachusetts in 1788. A particularly notable double bass luthier, Abraham Prescott, is known to have made 500 to 600 church basses, the earliest example dating from 1809. With the rising popularity of the reed organ in the 1840s, church basses fell into disuse.
