= Live in Paris 1971 =

Live album by Ornette Coleman
- Released: 2007
- Recorded: November 1, 1971
- Venue: Paris, France
- Genre: Free jazz
- Label: Jazz Row; JR651

Live in Paris 1971 is a live album by Ornette Coleman. It was recorded in November 1971 in Paris, and was released by Jazz Row in 2007. On the album, which was recorded one day before The Belgrade Concert, Coleman is joined by saxophonist Dewey Redman, bassist Charlie Haden, and drummer Ed Blackwell.

According to Eric Miller of All About Jazz, the track titled "Silhouette" is actually a version of "Airborne" from the album Love Call.

== Reception ==
Professional ratings
Review scores
Source	Rating
AllMusic	4/5 stars
The Guardian	4/5 stars
The Free Jazz Collective	4/5 stars

In a review for AllMusic, Don Snowden wrote: "There's nothing remotely bootleg about the sound quality, the jacket photos by Val Wilmer are great, the liner notes informative enough, and the music simply exceptional... there are plenty of open spaces for the quartet to listen and play off one another... Live in Paris 1971 is hands down the best CD to emerge from that particular tour to date and certainly ranks as a prime showcase for this quartet. Glorious music, simply glorious."

The Guardian's John Fordham stated: "Ornette Coleman's conviction that jazz improvising could be unlocked from song chords without losing its lyricism changed the world for musicians and audiences alike, and this 1971 Paris gig shows how... It's mostly intense and in free-jazz hyperdrive, but there's hardly a slack moment. Being Coleman, of course, the improv and the vivacious themes are as eloquent as each other."

Ken Cheetham, writing for Jazz Views, commented: "this fabulous performance is a major showcase for the quartet and a virtual revelation of how to unravel extemporisation from the chords of the music... The quartet's music is effervescent, vibrant and the improvisation imaginative and articulate. This is very fine jazz indeed and the quartet ranks amongst the very top bands ever in the jazz milieu."

A reviewer for The Free Jazz Collective remarked: "This record is a fine one... despite the lack of coherence, it is still worthwhile... Not an essential recording, but still nice to hear."

== Track listing ==
All compositions by Ornette Coleman.

1. "Street Woman" – 15:01
2. "Summer-Thang" – 11:10
3. "Silhouette" – 13:04
4. "Rock the Clock" – 14:36

== Personnel ==
- Ornette Coleman – alto saxophone, trumpet, violin
- Dewey Redman – tenor saxophone, musette
- Charlie Haden – bass
- Ed Blackwell – drums
