= Essence (John Lewis album) =

Studio album by John Lewis
- Released: 1965
- Recorded: September 9, 1960, May 25, 1962 and October 5, 1962; NYC
- Genre: Jazz
- Length: 33:03
- Labels: Atlantic; SD 1425
- Producers: Nesuhi Ertegun, Tom Dowd

John Lewis chronology
Animal Dance (1964)	Essence (1965)	P.O.V. (1975)

Essence (subtitled John Lewis Plays the Compositions & Arrangements of Gary McFarland) is an album by pianist and conductor John Lewis recorded for the Atlantic label in 1960 and 1962.

== Reception ==
Professional ratings
Review scores
Source	Rating
Allmusic	3/5 stars

Allmusic awarded the album 3 stars.

== Track listing ==
All compositions by Gary McFarland

1. "Hopeful Encounter" - 4:47
2. "Tillamook Two" - 7:11
3. "Night Float" - 4:14
4. "Notions" - 3:57
5. "Another Encounter" = 5:09
6. "Wish Me Well" - 7:45
- Recorded in New York City on September 9, 1960 (track 3), May 25, 1962 (tracks 1, 4 & 6) and October 5, 1962 (2 & 5)

== Personnel ==
- John Lewis - piano
- Freddie Hubbard (tracks 1, 4 & 6), Louis Mucci (tracks 1, 4 & 6), Herb Pomeroy (track 3), Nick Travis (tracks 1, 4 & 6) - trumpet
- Mike Zwerin - trombone (tracks 1, 4 & 6)
- Bob Northern (tracks 1, 4 & 6), Gunther Schuller (track 3), Robert Swisshelm (tracks 1, 4 & 6) - French horn
- Don Butterfield - tuba (tracks 1, 4 & 6)
- Harold Jones - flute (tracks 2 & 5)
- William Arrowsmith - oboe (tracks 2 & 5)
- Loren Glickman - bassoon (tracks 2 & 5)
- Phil Woods - clarinet (tracks 2 & 5)
- Don Stewart - basset horn (tracks 2 & 5)
- Eric Dolphy (track 2, 3 & 5) - alto saxophone, flute
- Benny Golson (track 3) - tenor saxophone
- Gene Allen (tracks 2 & 5), Jimmy Giuffre (track 3) - baritone saxophone
- Billy Bean (tracks 1, 4 & 6), Jim Hall (tracks 2, 3 & 5) - guitar
- Richard Davis (tracks 1, 2 & 4–6), George Duvivier (track 3) - bass
- Connie Kay - drums
- Gary McFarland - arranger
