= Marian Petrescu =

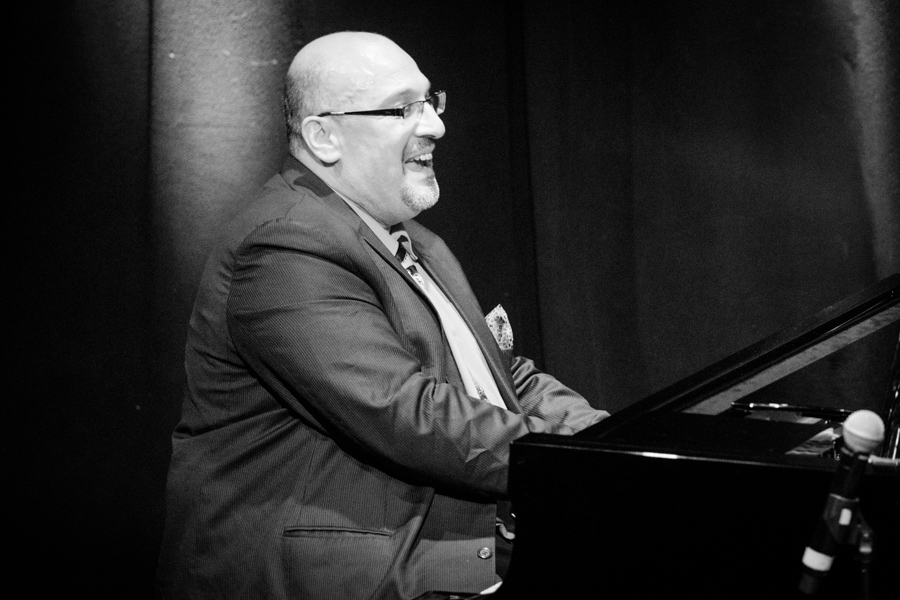
Marian Petrescu at Cosmopolite (2018)

Marian Petrescu (born 1970, Bucharest, Romania) is a Romanian jazz pianist. Playing since the age of 4, he has been on the jazz scene since the age of 15 after appearing at Pori Jazz. He is known for his work with the renowned jazz guitarist Andreas Öberg, and many others.

Petrescu moved to Sweden in the 1980s where he attended the conservatory in Stockholm. He now resides in Finland where he studied at the Sibelius Academy, Helsinki.

== Discography ==
- 1986: Pianist (Kompass Records)
- 2006: Body and Soul (Hot Club Records)
- 2009: Resonance Big Band Pays Tribute to Oscar Peterson (Resonance Records)
- 2010: Marian Petrescu Quartet with Andreas Öberg – Thrivin' – Live at Jazz Standard (Resonance Records)
