= Skies of America =

Studio album by Ornette Coleman
- Released: April 28, 1972
- Recorded: April 17–20, 1972
- Studio: Abbey Road Studios, London
- Genre: Orchestral jazz; avant-garde jazz; 20th-century classical
- Length: 41:13
- Label: Columbia
- Producer: Paul Myers

Ornette Coleman chronology
Science Fiction (1972)	Skies of America (1972)	To Whom Who Keeps a Record (1975)

Professional ratings
Review scores
Source	Rating
Allmusic	4/5 stars
The Rolling Stone Jazz Record Guide	4/5 stars
The Penguin Guide to Jazz Recordings	3.5/4 stars
Tom Hull	B+
DownBeat	5/5 stars

Skies of America is the 17th album by jazz saxophonist Ornette Coleman, released on Columbia Records in 1972. It consists of one long composition by Coleman taking up both sides of the album, played by the London Symphony Orchestra and conducted by David Measham. Coleman himself only plays on a few segments, and there is no other jazz instrumentation.

== Background ==
Coleman had encountered third stream music in the 1950s, had played sessions for Gunther Schuller in 1960, and had composed two earlier orchestral works, Inventions of Symphonic Poems in 1967 and Sun Suite of San Francisco in 1968. Immediately prior to this album, he had done arranging work for Alice Coltrane on her album Universal Consciousness. He had initially envisioned Skies as a concerto grosso for jazz combo and orchestra, but owing to contractual disputes with the musician's union in England, his band would not be allowed to record at all, and Coleman limited his own contribution to solos over the orchestra for select segments of the music.

Disenchanted with the music business after a less-than-enthusiastic response to his music, Coleman took a sabbatical to Montana in 1965. Coleman witnessed a group of Native Americans and it inspired him.

"It was so cold," he said of that time in Montana. "It must have been 2 or 3 below zero, and when I saw the American Indians praying, doing their purity ritual, they looked like their bodies were transparent. All of a sudden, I saw the American Indian and the sky as the same people. It taught me something about religion, race, wealth, poverty, commerce. I said: 'Oh, I'm going to go over to the other side. I only want to be on the side of the consciousness that comes to people naturally.'"

Coleman began writing sketches of what became Skies of America. The work features what Coleman called "Harmolodics", a merger of harmony, melody, and movement.

== Content ==
The album contains nearly all of the music that Coleman wrote for Skies of America, though several repeated motifs and two other segments were removed from the work in order to accommodate the limited album playing time. The 21 track titles were added by Coleman as an afterthought, Columbia executives hoping that the work might attract airplay via shorter lengths given promotion similar to that for singles. Recording sessions took place at Abbey Road Studios in London from April 17 to 20, 1972.

== Reception ==
The Allmusic review by Thom Jurek stated that "this is still dangerous and rewarding music". The Penguin Guide to Jazz awards it three and a half stars, declaring the album "another grand mess, generously and boldly conceived but stifled by the grim playing of the LSO." On May 2, 2000, the album was remastered and reissued for compact disc. The piece appeared in full continuity without the break for the album sides.

Bob Palmer of Rolling Stone praised the album saying "This music will leave few listeners unmoved, and it leaves room for a multitude of personal reactions to the negative and positive qualities of life under America’s skies." Bill Milkowski of JazzTimes was also impressed with the work but he cautioned that it was "imposing" and would "present quite a challenge to listeners and die-hard fans alike."

Gary Giddins reviewed the album for DownBeat and concluded "... it is a major achievement by any standard, and mandatory listening for anyone at all interested in contemporary music."

== Track listing ==
All tracks are composed by Ornette Coleman.

=== Side one ===
No.	Title	Length
1.	"Skies of America"	2:49
2.	"Native Americans"	1:10
3.	"The Good Life"	1:33
4.	"Birthdays and Funerals"	3:13
5.	"Dreams"	0:51
6.	"Sounds of Sculpture"	1:20
7.	"Holiday for Heroes"	1:10
8.	"All of My Life"	3:08
9.	"Dancers"	1:17
10.	"The Soul Within Woman"	0:47
11.	"The Artist in America"	3:54

=== Side two ===
No.	Title	Length
1.	"The New Anthem"	0:31
2.	"Place in Space"	2:44
3.	"Foreigner in A Free Land"	1:19
4.	"Silver Screen"	1:10
5.	"Poetry"	1:15
6.	"The Men Who Live in the White House"	2:48
7.	"Love Life"	4:34
8.	"The Military"	0:32
9.	"Jam Session"	0:39
10.	"Sunday in America"	4:29

== Personnel ==
- Ornette Coleman – alto saxophone on "The Artist in America," "Foreigner in A Free Land," "Silver Screen," "Poetry," "The Men Who Live in the White House," "Love Life," and "Jam Session"
- Dewey Redman - Tenor Saxophone, Oboe
- Charlie Haden - Bass
- Ed Blackwell - Drums
- London Symphony Orchestra – instruments
- David Measham – conductor
- Anthony Clark, Mike FitzHenry – engineers
- Ed Lee – cover design
- Michael Gross – cover art
