= Original Sin (John Lewis album) =

Studio album by John Lewis
- Released: 1961
- Recorded: March 27–28 & 31, 1961; NYC
- Genre: Jazz
- Label: Atlantic; SD 1370
- Producer: Nesuhi Ertegun

John Lewis chronology
Jazz Abstractions (1960)	Original Sin (1961)	European Encounter (1962)

Original Sin (subtitled Music for Ballet Composed by John Lewis) is an album in the third stream genre composed by John Lewis recorded for the Atlantic label in 1961.

== Reception ==
Professional ratings
Review scores
Source	Rating
AllMusic	2/5 stars
DownBeat	2.5/5 stars

The contemporaneous DownBeat reviewer criticised the sound balance on the opening track – "it very rapidly becomes a concerto for cymbal and small band" – and condemned the inconsistency of the music: "The first variation of Part 2 is unabridged musical comedy pit band. But the tantalizing thing is that Variation 2 is a clever, self-sustaining, unified, and original little composition. Variation 3 sounds like a fashion show, but Variation 4 is a lovely, light, unpretentious piece, and Variation 5 is simple, stark, and well composed[,] reminiscent of Aaron Copland at his best." AllMusic awarded the album 2 stars.

== Track listing ==
All compositions by John Lewis

1. "Part One: Creation of the World & Creation of Adam" - 3:53
2. "Part Two: Recognition of Animals"
  1. "Introduction" - 0:47
  2. "Variant I: Zebra, Lion, Camel" - 1:27
  3. "Variant II: Walrus, Ape" - 0:52
  4. "Variant III: Lamb, Leopard" - 1:48
  5. "Variant IV: Rabbit, Skunk, Fox" - 0:45
  6. "Variant V: Mountain Sheep, Deer" - 1:40
  7. "Finale" - 2:10
3. "Part Three: Birth of Eve" - 3:48
4. "Part Four: Adam & Eve Pas de Deux" - 2:36
5. "Part Five: Teaching & Temptation" - 4:11
6. "Part Six: Expulsion from the Garden of Eden" - 2:46

== Personnel ==
- John Lewis - conductor, arranger
- Unidentified large orchestra
