= Resonance Records =

- Founded: 2008
- Founder: George Klabin
- Genre: Jazz
- Country of origin: U.S.
- Location: Los Angeles, California
- Official website: www.resonancerecords.org

Resonance Records is an independent jazz record label established in 2008 as the centerpiece of the Rising Jazz Stars Foundation, a non–profit organization dedicated to preserving the art and legacy of jazz. The label is based in Los Angeles, California and is devoted to preserving jazz and discovering the rising stars of tomorrow. The label's roster includes John Beasley, Bill Cunliffe, Tamir Hendelman, Christian Howes, Kathy Kosins, Andreas Öberg, Marian Petrescu, Claudio Roditi, Donald Vega and others. Resonance Records has also released recordings by John Coltrane, Bill Evans, Gene Harris, Scott LaFaro, Charles Lloyd, Charles Mingus, Wes Montgomery and Jaco Pastorius .

Rising Jazz Stars Foundation was founded by George Klabin in 2005 in an effort to provide support and assistance to talented jazz artists. It began as a production of performance opportunities for the artists at the Rising Jazz Stars Studio located in Beverly Hills. Klabin provided further support by creating Resonance Records, where all the artists would be assisted in record production, distribution, and performance opportunities. The goals were to "capture brilliant and passionate, magical moments that rise above the average jazz heard on most CDs and, on a more personal level, to be that missing agent for those deserving artists who simply had not received that serendipitous break, leading to proper publication and promotion of their best work".

== Awards ==
- Grammy Award nomination, Best Latin Jazz Album: Claudio Roditi, Brazilliance x4, 2009
- Grammy Award, Best Instrumental Arrangement: Resonance Big Band Plays Tribute to Oscar Peterson, 2009
- Grammy Award nomination, Best Jazz Instrumental Album: John Beasley, Positootly!, 2010
- Grammy Award, Best Album Notes: Ashley Kahn, John Coltrane: Offering, 2015

== Discography ==
Catalog #	Artist	Title	Year
RCD-1002	Andreas Öberg	My Favorite Guitars	2008
RCD-1018	Kathy Kosins	To the Ladies of Cool	2012
RCD-1015	Andreas Öberg	Six String Evolution	2010
RCD-1011	Angela Hagenbach	The Way They Made Me Feel	2009
HCD-2003	Bill Cunliffe	The Blues and The Abstract Truth, Take 2	2008
HCD-2012	Bill Evans	Live at Art D'Lugoff's Top of The Gate	2012
HLP-9012	Bill Evans	Live at Art D'Lugoff's Top of The Gate (3 LP Box Set)	2012
RCD-1005	Cathy Rocco	You’re Gonna Hear From Me	2008
RCD-1006	Christian Howes	Heartfelt	2008
RCD-1016	Christian Howes	Out of the Blue	2010
RCD-1024	Christian Howes	American Spirit	2015
RCD-1020	Christian Howes with special guest Richard Galliano	Southern Exposure	2013
HCD-2002	Claudio Roditi	Brazilliance x4	2009
HCD-2008	Claudio Roditi	Simpatico	2010
HCD-2010	Claudio Roditi	Bons Amigos	2011
RCD-1012	Dado Moroni	Live in Beverly Hills	2011
RBD-4012	Dado Moroni	Live in Beverly Hills (Blu-ray)	2011
RCD-1019	Donald Vega	Spiritual Nature	2012
HCD-2007	Freddie Hubbard	Pinnacle: Live and Unreleased from Keystone Korner	2011
HCD-2001	Gene Harris	Live in London	2008
HCD-2006	Gene Harris	Another Night in London	2010
RCD-1010	Greta Matassa	I Wanna be Loved	2009
HCD-2009	Harris Simon	The Mastery of Passion	2010
RCD-1009	Jermaine Landsberger	Gettin' Blazed	2009
RCD-1003	John Beasley	Letter to Herbie	2008
RCD-1013	John Beasley	Positootly!	2009
RCD-1007	Lori Bell	The Music of Djavan	2008
RCD-1014	Marian Petrescu	Thrivin' – Live at Jazz Standard	2010
RCD-1004	Mike Garson	Conversations with my Family	2008
RCD-1008	Resonance Big Band	Plays Tribute to Oscar Peterson	2009
HCD-2005	Scott LaFaro	Pieces of Jade	2009
RCD-1017	Tamir Hendelman	Destinations	2010
HCD-2004	Toninho Horta	To Jobim with Love	2008
HCD-2011	Wes Montgomery	Echoes of Indiana Avenue	2012
HCD-9011	Wes Montgomery	Echoes of Indiana Avenue (2 LP Deluxe Package)	2012
HCD-2013	Tommy Flanagan and Jaki Byard	The Magic of 2	2013
HLP-9013	Tommy Flanagan and Jaki Byard	The Magic of 2 (2 LP Deluxe Package)	2013
B0019632-02	John Coltrane	Offering: Live at Temple University (2 CD Deluxe Package)	2014
B0019632-01	John Coltrane	Offering: Live at Temple University (2 LP Deluxe Package)	2014
RCD-2016	Charles Lloyd	Manhattan Stories (2 CD)	2014
HLP-9016	Charles Lloyd	Manhattan Stories (12" Vinyl 2 LP)	2014
HLP-8016	Charles Lloyd	Live at Slugs (10" Vinyl 1 LP)	2014
RCD-1021	Richard Galliano	Sentimentale	2014
HLT-8014	Wes Montgomery	The Montgomery-Johnson Quintet (10" Vinyl 1 LP)	2014
HLT-8015	Wes Montgomery	Live at the Turf Club (10" Vinyl 1 LP)	2014
HCD-2021	Stan Getz and João Gilberto	Getz/Gilberto '76	2016
HCD-2035	Eric Dolphy	Musical Prophet: The Expanded 1963 New York Studio Sessions (3CD)	2019
HLP-9035	Eric Dolphy	Musical Prophet: The Expanded 1963 New York Studio Sessions (3LP)	2019
HLT-8021	Stan Getz and João Gilberto	Selections from Getz/Gilberto '76 (10" Vinyl 1 LP)	2016
HLP-8015	Stan Getz and João Gilberto	Getz/Gilberto '76 (12" Vinyl 2 LP)	2016
HLP-9027	Jaco Pastorius	Truth, Liberty & Soul (12" Vinyl 3 LP)	2017
