= Abraham Prescott =

American luthier

- Born: July 5, 1789; Deerfield, New Hampshire, United States
- Died: May 1, 1858 (aged 68); Concord, New Hampshire, United States
- Occupation: Luthier

Abraham Prescott (July 5, 1789 – May 1, 1858) was a noted luthier, particularly of the double bass, who worked in Deerfield and Concord, New Hampshire during the 19th century. Prescott built his first double bass in 1819, building 207 over the course of his career. Prescott and his apprentices also made hundreds of church basses in addition to violoncellos, violins, and keyboard instruments such as melodians.

Prescott basses are prized by professional musicians throughout the United States. One particularly famous Prescott bass was owned by jazz legend Scott LaFaro. The bass was damaged in the auto accident that killed LaFaro in 1961. It was later restored by Barrie Kolstein and is owned by Kolstein and Son, New York.
