= Ornette! =

Studio album by Ornette Coleman
- Released: February 1962
- Recorded: January 31, 1961
- Studios: Atlantic Studios, New York City
- Genres: Free jazz; avant-garde jazz
- Length: 43:49
- Label: Atlantic

Ornette Coleman chronology
Free Jazz: A Collective Improvisation (1961)	Ornette! (1962)	Ornette on Tenor (1962)

Ornette! is a studio album by the American jazz saxophonist Ornette Coleman, released in February 1962 by Atlantic Records. The album features bassist Scott LaFaro in place of Charlie Haden, who had left the quartet but would remain a regular collaborator with Coleman.

The recording session took place on January 31, 1961, at Atlantic Studios in New York City. Three outtakes from the session ("Proof Readers", "Check Up", and "The Alchemy of Scott LaFaro") would later appear on the 1993 box set Beauty Is A Rare Thing and the 1970s compilations Twins and The Art of the Improvisers. "Proof Readers" is also included on contemporary CD and digital reissues of the album.

The titles of the compositions are initialisms derived from works by Sigmund Freud: Wit and its Relation to the Unconscious, Totem and Taboo, Civilization and Its Discontents, and the essay Relation of the Poet to Day Dreaming.

== Reception ==
Professional ratings
Review scores
Source	Rating
AllMusic	4/5 stars
Down Beat	4.5/5 stars
The Penguin Guide to Jazz Recordings	3/4 stars
Pitchfork	8.8/10

The authors of the Penguin Guide to Jazz Recordings awarded the album three stars out of four, and wrote that the track titles were presumably the result of an effort to ground Coleman "in the psychoanalysis-obsessed Zeitgeist" and "[lend] weight to those who thought that Ornette's music and musical philosophy were for the couch rather than the concert hall or club." They note LaFaro as "a more forceful and harmonically challenging player than Haden."

In a review for AllMusic, Brian Olewnick commented that Coleman is found "plumbing his quartet music to ever greater heights of richness and creativity," concluding that the album was "a superb release and a must for all fans of Coleman and creative improvised music in general" and particularly praising drummer Ed Blackwell's performance.

Writing for Pitchfork, Alex Linhardt stated: "It's another impressive, comfortable record by someone who knows that racket extraordinarily well. It may not quite match the audacity and shock value of Free Jazz, but when you've just razed the scaffolds of structured music, it's probably as good as you're going to get."

== Track listing ==
All tracks are written by Ornette Coleman.

Side one
No.	Title	Length
1.	"W.R.U."	16:25
2.	"T. & T."	4:35
Total length:		21:00

Side two
No.	Title	Length
1.	"C. & D."	13:10
2.	"R.P.D.D."	9:39
Total length:		22:49 43:49

== Personnel ==
- Ornette Coleman – alto saxophone
- Don Cherry – pocket trumpet
- Scott LaFaro – double bass
- Ed Blackwell – drums
