= European Encounter =

Studio album by John Lewis & Svend Asmussen
- Released: 1962
- Recorded: July 2–3, 1962
- Studio: Como Studio in Stockholm, Sweden
- Genre: Jazz
- Length: 39:12
- Label: Atlantic; SD 1392
- Producer: John Lewis

John Lewis chronology
Original Sin (1961)	European Encounter (1962)	Animal Dance (1962)

European Encounter is an album by American pianist and composer John Lewis and Danish violinist Svend Asmussen recorded for the Atlantic label in 1962.

== Reception ==
Professional ratings
Review scores
Source	Rating
AllMusic	4/5 stars

AllMusic review by Scott Yanow stated: "Asmussen fits in well with Lewis and brings a solid sense of swing to the somewhat complex music".

== Track listing ==
All compositions by John Lewis, except as indicated

1. "If I Were Eve" - 5:45
2. "Winter Tale" - 5:43
3. "Slater's Theme" - 3:33
4. "Valeria" - 5:22
5. "Lonely Woman" (Ornette Coleman) - 8:13
6. "Django" - 3:40
7. "New York 19" - 7:28

== Personnel ==
- John Lewis - piano
- Svend Asmussen - violin
- Jimmy Woode - bass
- Sture Kallin - drums
