= Animal Dance (album) =

Studio album by John Lewis & Albert Mangelsdorff & The Zagreb Jazz Quartet
- Released: 1964
- Recorded: July 30, 1962; Baden-Baden, West Germany
- Genre: Jazz
- Length: 34:59
- Label: Atlantic; SD 1402
- Producer: John Lewis

John Lewis chronology
European Encounter (1962)	Animal Dance (1964)	Essence (1965)

Albert Mangelsdorff chronology
Animal Dance (1962)	Tension (1963)

Animal Dance is an album by American pianist and composer John Lewis and German trombonist Albert Mangelsdorff (with The Zagreb Jazz Quartet contributing one track) which was recorded in West Germany for the Atlantic label in 1962.

== Reception ==
Professional ratings
Review scores
Source	Rating
AllMusic	4/5 stars

Ken Dryden in his review for AllMusic states: "none of the musicians had ever played together, though it made little difference as they quickly absorbed the originals of Lewis and Mangelsdorff, along with the familiar standard 'Autumn Leaves' (a trio arrangement omitting Lewis) and Gary McFarland's 'Why Are You Blue'.".

== Track listing ==
All compositions by John Lewis, except as indicated

1. "Animal Dance" – 2:39
2. "Autumn Leaves" (Joseph Kosma, Johnny Mercer, Jacques Prévert) – 6:41
3. "Set 'Em Up" (Albert Mangelsdorff) – 3:18
4. "Monday in Milan" – 5:25
5. "The Sheriff" – 3:52
6. "Why Are You Blue?" (Gary McFarland) – 6:30
7. "Ornaments" (Davor Kajfes) – 6:34

== Personnel ==
Tracks 1–6:

- John Lewis – piano (tracks 1 & 3–6)
- Albert Mangelsdorff – trombone
- Karl-Theodor Geier – bass
- Silvije Glojnaric – drums

Track 7:

- Bosko Petrovic – vibraphone
- Davor Kajfes – piano
- Miljenko Prohaska – bass
- Silvije Glojnaric – drums
