= This Is Our Music (Ornette Coleman album) =

Studio album by The Ornette Coleman Quartet
- Released: March 1961
- Recorded: July 19 and 26, August 2, 1960
- Studios: Atlantic Studios, New York City
- Genres: Avant-garde jazz; free jazz
- Length: 38:46
- Label: Atlantic
- Producer: Nesuhi Ertegün

The Ornette Coleman Quartet chronology
Change of the Century (1960)	This Is Our Music (1961)	Free Jazz: A Collective Improvisation (1961)

This Is Our Music is the fifth studio album by the American jazz saxophonist Ornette Coleman, recorded in July and August 1960 and released on Atlantic Records in March 1961. It was Coleman's first album with drummer Ed Blackwell (replacing Billy Higgins), and his only album on Atlantic to include a standard, in this case a version of "Embraceable You" by George and Ira Gershwin.

The album was recorded at Atlantic Studios in New York City over the course of three sessions on July 19 and 26 and August 2, 1960, with seven selections culled from 23 masters. The outtakes from the two July sessions would later appear on the 1970s compilations The Art of the Improvisers, Twins, and To Whom Who Keeps A Record, along with the 1993 box set Beauty Is A Rare Thing (named for a track on this album), which collected all of the material that Coleman recorded for Atlantic from 1959 to 1961. Coleman was pleased with the recordings, stating: "In July, 1960... we did thirty tunes in three weeks. All originals. Everything I've ever recorded has been a piece of my own. Until I heard these last tapes, I hadn't realized all the different approaches we'd been developing in the past few months. I think the new albums will give the public and the musicians a more accurate idea of what we're trying to do."

In his liner notes for the album, Coleman was careful to place his music in historical context, writing:

the most important part of our music is the improvisation, which is done as spontaneously as possible, with each man contributing his musical expression to create the form. Now - let's look back. Group improvisation is not new. In early jazz, that kind of group playing was known as Dixieland. In the swing era, the emphasis changed and improvisation took the form of solos based on riffs. In modern jazz, improvisation is melodic and harmonically progressive. Now we are blending the three together to create and give more freedom to the player and more pleasure to the listener.

He also paid tribute to his bandmates, writing that "the experience of playing with these men is unexplainable and I only know that what they know is far beyond a technical explanation for me to convey to you." He concluded the notes by writing: "Since there isn't too much I haven't told you about my music, I really told you about myself through it. The other autobiography of my life is like everyone else's. Born, work, sad and happy and etc. We do hope you enjoy our music."

== Reception ==
Professional ratings
Review scores
Source	Rating
AllMusic	4.5/5 stars
DownBeat	1/5 stars
The Penguin Guide to Jazz Recordings	3.5/4 stars
Pitchfork	9.4/10
The Rolling Stone Jazz Record Guide	5/5 stars

In a retrospective review for AllMusic, Steve Huey noted that the word "our" in the title of the album "makes clear just how important the concept of group improvisation was to Coleman's goals. Anyone can improvise whenever he feels like it, and the players share such empathy that each knows how to add to the feeling of the ensemble without undermining its egalitarian sense of give and take." He concluded that the album "keeps one of the hottest creative streaks in jazz history going strong."

Mark Richardson of Pitchfork stated: "What amazes me about this era of Coleman... is how accessible it is. Back in the day, this band had the intelligentsia calling for Coleman to be fitted for a straightjacket, but to one weaned on the 60s Impulse! catalog, the music sounds joyous, pretty, sensible and sane." He wrote that "[t]he uptempo tracks here are teeming with life" and noted that "sporadic surges in tempo are early experiments in elastic time (a trend that would be explored at great length as the 60s progressed), and these bursts of energy make these pieces seem, well, bountiful."

Writing for All About Jazz, C. Michael Bailey called This Is Our Music "the militantly expressed jumping-off point... on the way to the epochal Free Jazz", and stated that Coleman "takes a stand here, pushing his vision of musical freedom farther than on any previous release", and "fully leaps the edge of tradition into the chaotic and sublime future he, himself, was forging." According to Bailey, "This is Our Music is Coleman at the point of completely letting go."

Pianist and composer Ethan Iverson called the version of "Embraceable You" on the album "probably the ultimate Rorschach test for Ornette’s fans and skeptics...These days I no longer hear the form as constantly getting lost, but instead as a through-composed collective improvisation. Ornette uses pure melody to shape his solo. [Charlie] Haden is right there, abstracting the tune’s changes and humbly serving Ornette’s broken-hearted smear. Blackwell’s mallets are perfect...The searing, Coleman-composed introduction may be better than the Gershwin tune. It’s a performance that requires compassion to be understood."

Jake Cole, writing for Spectrum Culture, stated that "the album's title is a confrontation...yet the militancy of the album's name and the legacy of Coleman's impact belies the sheer beauty of the compositions." He concludes that "Coleman was and remains principally absorbed in the immediacy of human emotion, and his impressionism is still the high-water mark in transposing a feeling."

== Track listing ==
All tracks are written by Ornette Coleman except as noted.

Side one
No.	Title	Date	Length
1.	"Blues Connotation"	July 19	5:16
2.	"Beauty Is A Rare Thing"	August 2	7:13
3.	"Kaleidoscope"	July 19	6:36

Side two
No.	Title	Writer(s)	Date	Length
1.	"Embraceable You"	George Gershwin; Ira Gershwin	July 26	4:54
2.	"Poise"		August 2	4:40
3.	"Humpty Dumpty"		July 26	5:23
4.	"Folk Tale"		August 2	4:44

== Personnel ==
- Ornette Coleman – alto saxophone
- Don Cherry – pocket trumpet
- Charlie Haden – double bass
- Ed Blackwell – drums
