= Pieces of Jade =

Studio album by Scott LaFaro
- Released: 2009
- Recorded: 1960, 1961, 1966, 1985
- Genre: Jazz
- Length: 1:13:38
- Label: Resonance Records; HCD-2005

Pieces of Jade is a posthumously released album by jazz bassist Scott LaFaro. It consists of five tracks dating from 1961 featuring LaFaro in a trio format with pianist Don Friedman and drummer Pete La Roca, a 23-minute recording of LaFaro rehearsing with pianist Bill Evans in 1960, a 1966 interview with Evans, and a Friedman solo piano piece dedicated to LaFaro, recorded in 1985. The album was released in 2009 by Resonance Records.

According to Friedman, who briefly roomed with LaFaro in 1957, the recording of the 1961 trio tracks was unplanned: the three musicians happened to be in a studio, and the engineer said "Why don't you guys play and I'll record you." These five tracks were initially released on Friedman's album Memories for Scotty, issued in 1988 by the Japanese label Insights.

2009 also saw the publication of the LaFaro biography Jade Visions, written by the bassist's sister Helene LaFaro-Fernandez, and published by University of North Texas Press as part of their Lives of Musicians Series.

== Reception ==
Professional ratings
Review scores
Source	Rating
AllMusic	3.5/5 stars
All About Jazz	3.5/5 stars
All About Jazz	4/5 stars
PopMatters	8/10 stars
The Absolute Sound	4/5 stars

In a review for AllMusic, Michael G. Nastos wrote: "that this recording exists is nothing less than a miracle, and an event in the annals of jazz... It's a rare window into the soul of Scott LaFaro... and a complement to the book written by his sister."

Larry Taylor of All About Jazz stated: "The greatness of LaFaro is reestablished here as he once more excels in the trio format. In this context, it's possible to further appreciate LaFaro's improvisational skill and full bass sound... it's very fortunate to have another recording to add to his legacy." AAJ's Stuart Broomer called the album "a fitting tribute to an essential musician, a complement to the masterpieces LaFaro created with Evans."

Ron Hart, writing for PopMatters, commented: "Pieces of Jade offers a rare glimpse into LaFaro's creative process."

The Absolute Sound's Bill Milkowski praised LaFaro's "melodic ingenuity along with his uncanny speed and facility," and noted that, in the trio pieces, his "ability to spontaneously and effortlessly interject contrapuntal ideas against the flow of each piece marks him as a revolutionary accompanist in a piano trio setting."

In an article for Elsewhere, Graham Reid wrote: "This is classic piano trio jazz... An interesting, valuable and unexpected one from the archives for those deeply into this kind of seminal jazz."

== Track listing ==
1. "I Hear a Rhapsody" (Dick Gasparre, George Fragos, Jack Baker) – 6:17
2. "Sacre Bléu (take 1)" (Don Friedman) – 6:11
3. "Green Dolphin St." (Bronisław Kaper, Ned Washington) – 6:36
4. "Sacre Bléu (take 2)" (Don Friedman) – 6:18
5. "Woody 'n' You" (Dizzy Gillespie) – 5:38
6. "My Foolish Heart - Rehearsal Tape: Bill Evans and Scott LaFaro - 1960" (Victor Young, Ned Washington) – 22:44
7. "Interview with Bill Evans by George Klabin 1966" – 13:39
8. "Memories for Scotty" (Don Friedman) – 6:23
- Tracks 1–5 recorded in 1961. Track 6 recorded in 1960. Track 7 recorded in 1966. Track 8 recorded in 1985.

== Personnel ==
- Scott LaFaro – bass (tracks 1–6)
- Don Friedman – piano (tracks 1–5, 8)
- Pete LaRoca – drums (tracks 1–5)
- Bill Evans – piano (track 6)
