= Friends and Neighbors: Live at Prince Street =

Live album by Ornette Coleman
- Released: 1972
- Recorded: February 14, 1970
- Genre: Jazz
- Length: 38:03
- Label: Flying Dutchman
- Producer: Bob Thiele and Ornette Coleman

Ornette Coleman chronology
Crisis (1969)	Friends and Neighbors: Live at Prince Street (1972)	Broken Shadows (1971)

Friends and Neighbors: Live at Prince Street is a live album by the American jazz saxophonist and composer Ornette Coleman recorded in 1970 and released on the Flying Dutchman label.

== Reception ==
Professional ratings
Review scores
Source	Rating
Allmusic	3/5 stars
DownBeat	3.5/5 stars
MSN Music (Expert Witness)	A
The Penguin Guide to Jazz Recordings	3.5/4 stars
The Rolling Stone Jazz Record Guide	3/5 stars
Tom Hull	A−

In a retrospective review for Allmusic, jazz writer Scott Yanow found the music "typically adventurous, melodic in its own way, yet still pretty futuristic, even if (compared with his other releases) the set as a whole is not all that essential". Writing in MSN Music, Robert Christgau believed it has the unintended feel of a jam session, as Coleman's "time-tested Charlie Haden-Ed Blackwell rhythm section beefed up by Dewey Redman, whose tenor is always there to add some body when Ornette picks up a trumpet or violin."

The authors of The Penguin Guide to Jazz awarded the album 3½ stars, and commented: "Friends and Neighbors... catches Ornette in particularly laid-back form, sounding relaxed even in the squalls of violin on the title track and creating blues progressions of astonishing originality on the alto tracks. Whatever its standing, it's a more than worthwhile addition to the catalogue."

== Track listing ==
All compositions by Ornette Coleman

1. "Friends and Neighbors [Vocal Version]" - 4:14
2. "Friends and Neighbors" - 2:57
3. "Long Time No See" - 10:54
4. "Let's Play" - 3:25
5. "Forgotten Songs" - 4:26
6. "Tomorrow" - 12:07

- Recorded at Prince Street in New York on February 14, 1970.

== Personnel ==
- Ornette Coleman - alto saxophone, trumpet, violin
- Dewey Redman - tenor saxophone, clarinet
- Charlie Haden - bass
- Ed Blackwell - drums
