= The Belgrade Concert =

Live album by Ornette Coleman
- Released: 1995
- Recorded: November 2, 1971
- Venue: Belgrade
- Genre: Free jazz
- Label: Jazz Door; JD 12112

The Belgrade Concert is a live album by Ornette Coleman. It was recorded in November 1971 in Belgrade, and was released by Jazz Door in 1995. On the album, which was recorded one day after the concert documented on Live in Paris 1971, Coleman is joined by saxophonist Dewey Redman, bassist Charlie Haden, and drummer Ed Blackwell.

Regarding the inclusion of his "Song for Ché" on the album, Haden recalled: "Ornette didn't usually play other people's songs: I was really surprised that he wanted to do one of mine. But he loved it."

== Reception ==
Professional ratings
Review scores
Source	Rating
AllMusic	4/5 stars

In a review for AllMusic, Scott Yanow wrote: "This valuable live import features Ornette Coleman... and his 1971 Quartet... performing Haden's 'Song for Che' and four obscure Coleman compositions. The recording quality is decent and Redman proves to be a perfect musical partner for Ornette. Superior and often exciting free bop music."

While interviewing Charlie Haden, pianist and composer Ethan Iverson described the recording as "one of the greatest things I have ever heard," and told Haden: "Your combination of folk song, avant-garde sensibility, and Bach-like classical harmony is a stream in this music just as distinctive as Thelonious Monk or Elvin Jones. In that quartet with Ornette, Dewey, and Blackwell, no one else could have ever done what you did. I think Ornette knew this."

== Track listing ==
1. "Announcement" – 2:14
2. "Street Woman" (Coleman) – 8:20
3. "Who Do You Work For" (Coleman) – 5:16
4. "Written Word" (Coleman) – 10:24
5. "Song for Ché" (Haden) – 15:03
6. "Rock the Clock" (Coleman) – 7:46

== Personnel ==
- Ornette Coleman – saxophone, trumpet, violin
- Dewey Redman – tenor saxophone, musette
- Charlie Haden – bass
- Ed Blackwell – drums
