= The Shape of Jazz to Come =

Studio album by Ornette Coleman
- Released: November 1959
- Recorded: May 22, 1959
- Studios: Radio Recorders, Hollywood
- Genres: Avant-garde jazz; free jazz
- Length: 37:59
- Label: Atlantic
- Producer: Nesuhi Ertegun

Ornette Coleman chronology
| Tomorrow Is the Question! (1959) | The Shape of Jazz to Come (1959) | Change of the Century (1960) |

The Shape of Jazz to Come is the third studio album by the American jazz musician Ornette Coleman. Released on Atlantic Records in November 1959, it was his debut on the label and his first album featuring the quartet of himself, trumpeter Don Cherry, bassist Charlie Haden, and drummer Billy Higgins. The recording session for the album took place on May 22, 1959, at Radio Recorders in Hollywood. Although Coleman initially wished for the album to be titled Focus on Sanity after its fourth track, producer Nesuhi Ertegun suggested the final title, feeling that it would give consumers "an idea about the uniqueness of the LP."

In 2012, the Library of Congress added The Shape of Jazz to Come to the National Recording Registry. The album was included in all three editions of the Rolling Stone list of the 500 greatest albums of all time. AllMusic called it one of the 20 essential free jazz albums. The album was inducted into the Grammy Hall of Fame in 2015.

== Background ==
From 1948 to 1958, Coleman moved between New Orleans, his hometown of Fort Worth, Texas, and Los Angeles, working various jobs and developing his own unique sound that was often met with hostility. His approach initially made it difficult for him to make ends meet by playing music. While employed as an elevator operator in Los Angeles, he studied music theory and harmony and developed an idiosyncratic take on country blues and folk forms.

Coleman's big break came in Los Angeles when he caught the attention of bassist Percy Heath and pianist John Lewis of the Modern Jazz Quartet. Lewis encouraged Coleman and his trumpeter, Don Cherry, to attend the Lenox School of Jazz summer program in Massachusetts in 1959, at which Lewis was the director. Lewis also secured Coleman a deal with Atlantic Records, which paid his tuition at the Lenox School. Though both Coleman and Cherry were already rather accomplished by this point in their careers, Lewis wanted to use their attendance at Lenox to generate buzz amongst jazz circles. Their presence at the school was not without friction amongst students and faculty alike, but in the end, their attending the school accomplished what Lewis hoped to achieve. Coleman was subsequently booked by Lewis to play at the 1959 Monterey Jazz Festival in California.

In June 1959, Coleman suggested to Atlantic jazz producer Nesuhi Ertegun that he was considering abandoning music in order to study religion. Ertegun, confident of Coleman's potential, urged him to reconsider.

== Content ==
Coleman's quartet, like Gerry Mulligan's, was unusual in that it did not employ a chordal instrument such as a piano or guitar. Each composition contains a brief thematic statement, then several minutes of free improvisation, followed by a repetition of the main theme. While this resembles the conventional head-solo-head structure of bebop, it abandons the use of chord structures. The Shape of Jazz to Come found Coleman and his quartet elaborating on the sound and themes he had been developing throughout his career.

One prominent feature of Coleman's signature sound was that he played a plastic Grafton saxophone, which contributed to the harshness of his timbre. He coined the term "harmolodic", a combination of harmony, movement, and melody, to describe his philosophy of improvisation which heavily emphasized melody rather than harmony. It was early in his career, in an attempt to further emphasize focus on melody over harmony, that he stopped including a piano as a part of his ensembles.

Coleman continues with this tradition on The Shape of Jazz to Come, dispensing with harmonic accompaniment and focusing solely on improvised melodies and variations on themes and motifs. His use of microtonal intervals was central to his sound, and he even went as far as to suggest that the same pitch should sound different when played in different contexts, stating that "jazz is the only music in which the same note can be played night after night, but differently each time". The album was a breakthrough and helped to establish the free jazz movement. Later avant-garde jazz was often very different from Coleman's work, but the work helped to lay the foundation upon which much subsequent avant-garde and free jazz would be built.

=== "Lonely Woman" ===
The album contains one of the few Coleman compositions to achieve jazz standard status, "Lonely Woman". Coleman was moved to compose the song when, while on a lunch break from his job in a department store stock room in Los Angeles in the early 1950s, he came across a photograph of a woman in a gallery. Coleman describes the photograph as follows:

In the background there was everything you could imagine that was wealthy – all in her background – but she was so sad. And I said, 'Oh my goodness. I understand this feeling. I have not experienced this wealth, but I understand the feeling.' I went home and wrote 'Lonely Woman'... I related the condition to myself, wrote this song, and ever since it has grown and grown and grown.

Fred Kaplan wrote:

'Lonely Woman' begins with Haden playing a slow bass dirge. Higgins follows with a fast drum riff (a pairing of slow bass and fast drums was unusual enough). Then Coleman and Cherry, in unison, blow a sorrowful melody, both of them bending notes, wailing, so naked with emotion that it still raises shivers a half century later. After reciting the theme a couple times, Coleman takes his solo, which wanders off in a different direction; if you were expecting to hear an improvisation on harmony, it might seem like a different song. But he's improvising on other aspects of the song, especially its emotion. The other players do the same. Somehow it all hangs together, and toward the end, they come back to the theme, come back down to Earth, with aplomb.

== Reception and legacy ==
Professional ratings
Review scores
| Source | Rating |
|---|---|
| AllMusic | 5/5 stars |
| Down Beat | 4/5 stars |
| The Penguin Guide to Jazz | 4/4 stars |
| The Rolling Stone Jazz Record Guide | 5/5 stars |

On November 17, 1959, shortly after the release of the album, Coleman's quartet began a residency at the Five Spot Café in Manhattan. Arranged by John Lewis, it was initially scheduled to last two weeks, but was eventually extended to 2 1/2 months. The performances were well-attended and generated controversy amongst attendees, critics, and jazz musicians alike. Some musicians and critics praised Coleman for an inventiveness not seen since the emergence of bebop, including Charles Mingus, who said: "It’s like organized disorganization or playing wrong right. It gets to you emotionally like a drummer." Others, including Miles Davis, were unimpressed.

The album was ranked number 246 in Rolling Stone magazine's 2003 list of the 500 greatest albums of all time. The album's rank dropped to number 248 in the 2012 update of the list, and to number 417 in the 2020 update. In 2024, Paste magazine ranked The Shape of Jazz To Come number 231 on its list of the 300 Greatest Albums of All Time. The album was identified by Chris Kelsey in his AllMusic essay "Free Jazz: A Subjective History" as one of the 20 Essential Free Jazz Albums. In its ninth edition, The Penguin Guide to Jazz awarded the album a "crown" accolade, in addition to a four star rating. The album was inducted into the Grammy Hall of Fame in 2015.

Two outtakes from the session, "Monk and the Nun" and "Just for You", would later be released respectively on the 1970s compilations Twins and The Art of the Improvisers.

== Track listing ==
All tracks are written by Ornette Coleman.

Side one
| No. | Title | Length |
|---|---|---|
| 1. | "Lonely Woman" | 4:59 |
| 2. | "Eventually" | 4:20 |
| 3. | "Peace" | 9:04 |
| Total length: | | 18:23 |

Side two
| No. | Title | Length |
|---|---|---|
| 1. | "Focus on Sanity" | 6:50 |
| 2. | "Congeniality" | 6:41 |
| 3. | "Chronology" | 6:05 |
| Total length: | | 19:36 |

== Personnel ==
- Ornette Coleman – alto saxophone
- Don Cherry – cornet
- Charlie Haden – double bass
- Billy Higgins – drums

== See also ==
- The Shape of Things to Come
- The Shape of Punk to Come
