= Ed Blackwell =

American drummer (1929–1992)

Background information
- Born: Edward Joseph Blackwell; October 10, 1929; New Orleans, Louisiana, US
- Died: October 7, 1992 (aged 62) Middletown, Connecticut, US
- Genres: Avant-garde jazz; free jazz
- Instrument: Drums

Edward Joseph Blackwell (October 10, 1929 – October 7, 1992) was an American jazz drummer, best known for his work with saxophonist Ornette Coleman. Blackwell first came to national attention as a member of Coleman's quartet around 1960, when he took over for Billy Higgins during a residency at the Five Spot Café in Manhattan. Blackwell became a pioneering free jazz drummer, fusing New Orleans and African rhythms with bebop. Blackwell later toured and recorded extensively with fellow Coleman veterans Don Cherry, Charlie Haden, and Dewey Redman, both individually and as the quartet Old and New Dreams.

== Life and career ==
=== Early life ===
Blackwell was born on October 10, 1929, in New Orleans, and grew in the city's Garden District. Blackwell grew up in a family rich with diverse indigenous musical tradition, as well as connections to prominent musicians and the recording industry in New Orleans and the surrounding areas. The music of “Dizzy” Gillespie and Charlie Parker, supplied by Blackwell's older brothers, fostered an early interest in jazz. The second line brass band music of New Orleans also greatly influenced Blackwell's drumming style. He has also credited his inspiration for playing the drums to his time growing up trying to mimic and match the sounds of his older sisters tap dancing. He would use pots and pans, and old trash cans until he finally received his first drum.

Blackwell began studying under Wilbur Hogan and learned to read music as well as the basics of drumming. This encouraged Blackwell to join his high school's drum corps. Blackwell did not begin playing the drum set until his first professional gig at the age of 19.

=== Early career ===
Blackwell was first hired as a drummer in 1949 for the Jonson Brothers Band, playing a selection of jump blues, rhythm and blues, as well as shuffle. Blackwell worked with Ray Johnson and John “Plas” Johnson until 1951 when he moved to Los Angeles. During this time in Los Angeles, Blackwell become acquainted with Ornette Coleman. This would be a pivotal connection throughout the rest of Blackwell's career. Despite this, he would return to New Orleans in 1956 to play in the American Jazz Quintet with musicians Alvin Batiste, Peter "Chuck" Badie, Ellis Marsalis, Nat Perrilliat. In 1957, Blackwell toured with the Ray Charles Orchestra. After this, Blackwell spent much time playing rhythm and blues in New Orleans despite his personal affinity for bebop, to make a living.

==== Early musical style ====
Much of the earlier playing of Blackwell was inspired by the distinctive second line parade rhythms found in New Orleans in the 1930s and 1940s, as well as rhythm and blues. Blackwell's drumming style in the 50s was heavily influenced by bebop. This most prominently includes the drumming of Kenny Clarke and Max Roach. This is most evident in some earlier recordings from the American Jazz Quintet. During this period, much of Blackwell's playing can be described as song like in nature, being repetitive and often combining high and low-pitched beats found on the drum set. Blackwell's playing is typically phrased in groups of 4, 8, or 12. Despite the influence of bebop, much of Blackwell's original influences can be found in his playing around this time, for example, utilizing combinations of bass drum and cymbal common in the parade music of his childhood.

=== Free jazz years ===
This is the period in which Blackwell is most commonly associated with. By 1960, Blackwell had accepted an invitation to join Ornette Coleman's band in New York City. This resulted in a three-month engagement at with Coleman at the Five-Spot as well as going on the road. During this time, he appeared on a number of influential free jazz albums, including This is our Music and Free Jazz. However, after this time Blackwell and other members of the ensemble had very little work otherwise, causing himself and Don Cherry to leave Coleman's band. Together they went on to record in 1966 the albums Complete Communion, Symphony for Improvisers, and Where Is Brooklyn?. That same year, he played drums on The Avant-garde with John Coltrane. In 1961, Blackwell played in the Eric Dolphy-Booker Little Quintet, resulting in a series of successful recordings like the album At The Five Spot. Once again, after this success, Blackwell struggled to find work for a number of years except for a number of small gigs in and around New York City.

==== Free jazz musical style ====
Despite the avant-garde nature of free jazz, Blackwell's playing remains structured and influenced by his previous experiences. Much of free jazz lacks a traditional jazz structure, but Blackwell frequently incorporates different motivic patterns to create a sense of structure. Typically, the song-like aspects of his style also remain present during this time.

=== African influence ===
In 1967 and 1968, Blackwell traveled with Randy Weston on a state-funded tour to West Africa, North Africa, and the Middle East. During the tour, Blackwell transcribed many of the traditional rhythms of the places he visited. This exposure coincided with much of the Black Nationalism movement taking hold in the United States throughout the 60s. However, Blackwell never expressed these sentiments and maintained that his connection to Africa during this time was for cultural and musical edification rather than political. During this period, much of Blackwell's drumming becomes reminiscent of West African drumming techniques, exhibiting a dance-like quality relying heavily on layered polyrhythmic sequences.

=== Later years ===
In 1969, Blackwell once again played with Coleman. Short thereafter, he would take a position as an artist-in-residence at Wesleyan University in Middletown, Connecticut, where he would teach until his death. Only a few years later in 1973, his health began to decline; he would develop chronic kidney malfunction which would require frequent dialysis and limit his ability to travel. This led to a development of frequent health complications like pneumonia, which often made it difficult for him to work. Despite these complications, Blackwell went on to co-found Old and New Dreams with former bandmates Don Cherry and Charlie Haden, they were joined by Dewey Redman. They recorded two albums under that name in 1976 and 1979.

Throughout the 80s Blackwell performed with a number of top free jazz artists including but not limited to: Dennis Charles, Sunny Murray, Steve McCall, Jane Ira Bloom, Anthony Braxton, and David Murray. In 1981, Blackwell performed at the Woodstock Jazz Festival, held in celebration of the tenth anniversary of the Creative Music Studio, alongside Mark Helias, Carlos Ward, and Graham Haynes.

== Death ==
On October 7, 1992, Blackwell died at the age of 62 years old due to his complications related to chronic kidney failure at Hartford Hospital in Connecticut. He was survived by his wife, Frances Blackwell, and their three children. He was inducted into the DownBeat Jazz Hall of Fame the following year.

== Discography ==
=== As leader ===
- 1993: What It Is? Ed Blackwell Project Vol. 1 (Enja)
- 1994: What It Be Like? Ed Blackwell Project Vol. 2 (Enja)
- 1996: Walls–Bridges (Black Saint)

With Old and New Dreams

- Old and New Dreams (Black Saint, 1976)
- Old and New Dreams (ECM, 1979)
- Playing (ECM, 1980)
- A Tribute to Blackwell (Black Saint, 1987)

=== As sideman ===
With Ray Anderson

- Every One of Us (Gramavision)

With Bill Barron

- Jazz Caper (Muse, 1978 [1982])

With Karl Berger

- Karl Berger (ESP Disk)
- Tune In (Milestone)
- Just Play 1976 (Quark)
- Transit w/ Dave Holland (Black Saint)
- Crystal Fire (Quark)

With Jane Ira Bloom

- Mighty Lights (Enja)

With David Bond

- The Key of Life (Vineyard)

With Charles Brackeen

- Rhythm X (Strata-East, 1973)

With Anthony Braxton

- Six Compositions: Quartet (Antilles, 1982)

With Marion Brown

- Vista (Impulse!, 1975)
- Awofofora (Disco Mate)

With Ornette Coleman

- This Is Our Music (Atlantic, 1960)
- Free Jazz: A Collective Improvisation (Atlantic, 1960)
- Ornette! (Atlantic, 1961)
- Ornette on Tenor (Atlantic, 1961)
- Beauty Is a Rare Thing (Rhino/Atlantic)
- The Art of the Improvisers (Atlantic)
- Twins (Atlantic)
- To Whom Who Keeps a Record (Atlantic)
- Live in Milano 1968 (Jazz Up)
- The Unprecedented Music of Ornette Coleman (Lotus Passport)
- The Love Revolution (Gambit) – music previously issued on Live In Milano 1968 and The Unprecedented Music of Ornette Coleman
- Friends and Neighbors: Live at Prince Street (Flying Dutchman)
- Science Fiction (Columbia, 1971)
- Broken Shadows (Columbia, 1971 [1982])
- The Complete Science Fiction Sessions (Columbia, 1971–1972 [2000])
- Live in Paris 1971 (Jazz Row)
- The Belgrade Concert (Jazz Door)
- European Concert (Unique Jazz)
- Paris Concert (Trio)
- Skies of America (Columbia)
- Stating The Case (Jazz Anthology)

With Steve Coleman

- Rhythm in Mind (RCA/Novus)

With Alice Coltrane

- Carnegie Hall '71 (Hi Hat, 2018)
- The Carnegie Hall Concert (Impulse!, 2024)

With Don Cherry

- Complete Communion (Blue Note)
- The Avant-Garde (with John Coltrane as co-leader)
- Symphony for Improvisers (Blue Note)
- Where is Brooklyn? (Blue Note)
- Mu First Part (BYG Actuel, 1969)
- Mu Second Part (BYG Actuel, 1970)
- Relativity Suite (JCOA, 1973)
- El Corazón (ECM, 1982)
- Broken Shadows (Moon)
- Relativity Suite (JCOA)
- Tamma with Don Cherry and Ed Blackwell (Odin)
- Multikuti (A&M, 1990)
- Live at the Bracknell Jazz Festival, 1986 (BBC, 2002)

With Jayne Cortez

- Everywhere Drums (Bola Press)

With Stanley Cowell

- Regeneration (Strata East, 1976)

With Anthony Davis

- Song for the Old World (India Navigation, 1978)

With Eric Dolphy

- At the Five Spot, Vols 1 & 2
- Memorial Album (Prestige)
- Here and There (Prestige)
- Dash One (Prestige)

With Dewey Redman

- Tarik (BYG Actuel, 1969)
- Red and Black in Willisau (Black Saint, 1980)
- The Struggle Continues (ECM)

With Charlie Haden

- The Montreal Tapes: with Don Cherry and Ed Blackwell (Verve, 1989 [1994])

With Albert Heath

- Kawaida (O'Be)

With Clifford Jordan

- Lee Morgan w/ Clifford Jordan Quintet-Live in Baltimore 1968 (Fresh Sound)
- In the World (Strata-East, 1969 [1972])

With Joe Lovano

- From the Soul (Blue Note)
- Sounds of Joy (Enja)

With Jemeel Moondoc

- Judy's Bounce (Soul Note, 1982)

With David Murray

- Morning Song (Black Saint)
- Ming's Samba (Portrait)
- Death of a Sideman (DIW)

With Art Neville

- What's Going On" (Specialty)
- That Old Time Rock 'N' Roll" (Specialty)

With Yoko Ono

- Plastic Ono Band (Apple)

With Hilton Ruiz

- Cross Currents (Stash)

With Archie Shepp

- Further Fire Music (Impulse!)
- On This Night (GRP/Impulse!)
- The Magic of Ju-Ju (Impulse!)

With Bob Stewart

- Goin' Home (JMT, 1989)

With Mal Waldron

- Breaking New Ground (Baybridge 1983)
- Mal Waldron Plays Eric Satie (Baybridge, 1983)
- You and the Night and the Music (Paddle Wheel, 1983)
- The Git Go - Live at the Village Vanguard (Soul Note, 1986)
- The Seagulls of Kristiansund (Soul Note, 1986)

With Wadada Leo Smith

- The Blue Mountain's Sun Drummer (Kabell, 2010)
