= The Love Revolution =

The Love Revolution: Complete 1968 Italian Tour

Live album by Ornette Coleman Quartet
- Released: 2005
- Recorded: February 5, 1968; February 8, 1968
- Venue: Milan, Italy; Rome, Italy
- Genre: Free jazz
- Length: 1:40:26
- Label: Gambit Records; 69224; Solar Records; 4569963

The Love Revolution: Complete 1968 Italian Tour is a two-CD live album by the Ornette Coleman Quartet. Three tracks were recorded on February 5, 1968, in Milan, Italy, while the remaining four tracks were recorded on February 8, 1968, in Rome. The album was released in 2005 by Gambit Records, and was reissued in 2015 by Solar Records. The quartet format is unusual in that it features Coleman with two bassists, Charlie Haden and David Izenzon, along with drummer Ed Blackwell. On the Milan tracks, Coleman is heard on alto saxophone, while on the Rome tracks, he also plays trumpet and, on a track titled "Buddha Blues," shehnai.

All of the music on The Love Revolution was remastered after having been issued in bootleg form by a variety of obscure labels during the 1980s and 1990s. The tracks recorded in Milan were initially released by Jazz Up, a tiny Italian label, with the title Live In Milano 1968, as well as by Moon Records, also a small Italian label, under the name Languages. The tracks recorded in Rome were initially issued by the Italian labels Lotus and Passport, and the Japanese label Joker, with the title The Unprecedented Music of Ornette Coleman.

== Reception ==
Professional ratings
Review scores
Source	Rating
AllMusic Milan tracks	2.5/5 stars
AllMusic Rome tracks	4/5 stars
Jazzwise all tracks	4/5 stars
The Penguin Guide to Jazz Milan tracks	2/4 stars
The Penguin Guide to Jazz all tracks	3/4 stars
The Virgin Encyclopedia of Jazz Milan tracks	3/5 stars
The Virgin Encyclopedia of Jazz Rome tracks	3/5 stars

In a review of the Rome tracks for AllMusic, Brandon Burke wrote: "the quartet plays with great care and collective understanding throughout... At first, one may get the impression that Izenzon and Haden are battling each other to be heard, but as the disc rolls on it is clear that the two are indeed partners striving toward a common end... Worth hunting for."

Regarding the Milan tracks, the authors of The Penguin Guide to Jazz Recordings stated that the music "will appeal only to completists" due to the poor quality of the recording, while, concerning the complete collection, they noted that "the two-bass quartet was a fascinating development," and "most listeners will be glad to have" the recording.

Kevin Le Gendre of Jazzwise commented: "this quartet with its twin engine of double basses rates highly on the thrill scale... In Haden and Izenzon there are two players with sufficient contrast in tone and attack to give the music an intriguing sense of push and pull... Blackwell matches them for orchestral richness through his percussive swell on the drums... The leader... improvises magnificently throughout."

Writing for Elsewhere, Graham Reid called The Love Revolution "a revelation," and praised Coleman's performance on shehnai, noting: "You wonder why he didn't explore it more: it has an astringent tone that suits his emotionally affecting music."

Rock Salted's Syd Fabio remarked: "The elasticity provided by the two-bass lineup, along with the concert format, makes for an especially interesting version of 'Lonely Woman'... it is totally worth it for seasoned fans of Coleman's work."

== Track listing ==
All compositions by Ornette Coleman.

CD 1

1. "Lonely Woman" – 10:32
2. "Monsieur Le Prince" – 9:48
3. "Forgotten Children" – 11:08
4. "Buddha Blues" – 13:12
- Recorded in Rome on February 8, 1968.

CD2

1. "Tutti" – 23:05
2. "Three Wisemen and the Saint" – 13:48
3. "New York" – 18:48
- Recorded in Milan on February 5, 1968.

== Personnel ==
- Ornette Coleman – alto saxophone, trumpet, shehnai
- Charlie Haden – double bass
- David Izenzon – double bass
- Ed Blackwell – drums
