= Free Jazz: A Collective Improvisation =

Studio album by Ornette Coleman
- Released: September 1961
- Recorded: December 21, 1960
- Studios: A&R Studios, New York City
- Genre: Free jazz
- Length: 37:10
- Label: Atlantic
- Producer: Nesuhi Ertegün

Ornette Coleman chronology
This Is Our Music (1961)	Free Jazz: A Collective Improvisation (1961)	Ornette! (1962)

Professional ratings
Review scores
Source	Rating
Down Beat	5/5 stars
Allmusic	5/5 stars
The Penguin Guide to Jazz	4/4 stars
Yahoo! Music	(favorable)
The Rolling Stone Jazz Record Guide	5/5 stars

Free Jazz: A Collective Improvisation is a studio album by the American jazz saxophonist Ornette Coleman, released in September 1961 by Atlantic Records. The recording session took place on December 21, 1960, at A&R Studios in New York City. The sole outtake from the album session, "First Take," was later released on the 1971 compilation Twins and subsequent CD reissues of Free Jazz.

== Music ==
The album presents a continuous free improvisation with only a few brief pre-determined sections, recorded in one take with no overdubbing or editing. It features what Coleman called a "double quartet," i.e., two self-contained jazz quartets: each with a reed instrument, trumpet, bass, and drums. The two quartets are heard in separate channels, with Coleman's working quartet at the time (as featured on Ornette!) in the left channel, and the second quartet, including the former Coleman rhythm section of Charlie Haden and Ed Blackwell, on the right.

The two quartets play simultaneously, with the two rhythm sections providing a dense rhythmic foundation over which the wind players either solo or provide freeform commentaries, interspersed with pre-composed passages. The composed thematic material can be considered a series of brief, dissonant fanfares for the horns which serve as interludes between solos. Free Jazz was the first album-length improvisation at thirty-seven minutes, unheard of at the time.

The original LP package incorporated Jackson Pollock's 1954 painting The White Light. The cover was a gatefold with a cutout window in the lower right corner allowing a glimpse of the painting; opening the cover revealed the full artwork, along with liner notes by critic Martin Williams. Coleman was a fan of Pollock's work and a painter himself; the cover of his 1966 album The Empty Foxhole would feature his own artwork.

== Reception ==
In the January 18, 1962 issue of Down Beat magazine, in a special review titled "Double View of a Double Quartet," Pete Welding awarded the album five stars while John A. Tynan rated it "no stars".

AllMusic critic Steve Huey described it in his five-star retrospective review as "a staggering achievement" which "practically defies superlatives in its historical importance." It served as the blueprint for later large-ensemble free jazz recordings such as Ascension by John Coltrane and Machine Gun by Peter Brötzmann.

On March 3, 1998, Free Jazz was reissued on compact disc by Rhino Records as part of its "Atlantic 50" series marking Atlantic Records' fiftieth anniversary. The title track, split into two sections for each side of the LP, appeared here in continuous uninterrupted form, along with the previously issued "First Take".

== Track listing ==
=== Original LP ===
All tracks are written by Ornette Coleman.

Side one
No.	Title	Length
1.	"Free Jazz (Part One)"	19:55
Total length:		19:55

Side two
No.	Title	Length
1.	"Free Jazz (Part Two)"	16:28
Total length:		16:28 36:23

=== 1998 CD reissue ===
All tracks are written by Ornette Coleman.

No.	Title	Length
1.	"Free Jazz"	37:03
2.	"First Take"	17:06
Total length:		54:09

=== Timing of the various sections ===
- 00:00 Polyphonic introduction
- 00:07 Ensemble introduction to Eric Dolphy
- 00:22 Eric Dolphy – bass clarinet solo (right channel)
- 05:12 Ensemble introduction to Freddie Hubbard
- 05:40 Freddie Hubbard – trumpet solo (right channel)
- 09:54 Ensemble introduction to Ornette Coleman
- 10:05 Ornette Coleman alto saxophone solo (left channel)
- 19:36 Ensemble Introduction to Don Cherry
- 19:48 Don Cherry – pocket trumpet solo (left channel)
- 25:21 Ensemble introduction to Charlie Haden
- 25:26 Charlie Haden – bass solo (right channel)
- 29:51 Ensemble introduction to Scott LaFaro
- 30:00 Scott LaFaro – bass solo (left channel)
- 33:47 Polyphonic ensemble introduction to Ed Blackwell
- 34:00 Ed Blackwell – drum solo (right channel)
- 35:19 Ensemble introduction to Billy Higgins
- 35:28 Billy Higgins – drum solo (left channel)

== Personnel ==
Left channel

- Ornette Coleman – alto saxophone
- Don Cherry – pocket cornet
- Scott LaFaro – double bass
- Billy Higgins – drums

Right channel

- Eric Dolphy – bass clarinet
- Freddie Hubbard – trumpet
- Charlie Haden – double bass
- Ed Blackwell – drums

Technical

- Tom Dowd – recording engineer
- Nesuhi Ertegün – producer
