= New York Is Now! =

Studio album by Ornette Coleman
- Released: November 1968
- Recorded: April 29 & May 7, 1968
- Studio: A&R Studios, New York City
- Genre: Jazz
- Length: 39:51 (Original LP); 47:26 (CD reissue)
- Label: Blue Note
- Producer: Francis Wolff

Ornette Coleman chronology
The Music of Ornette Coleman (1967)	New York Is Now! (1968)	Love Call (1971)

New York Is Now! is an album by the American jazz saxophonist and composer Ornette Coleman released on the Blue Note label in 1968.

The album sees Coleman accompanied by John Coltrane's former bandmates, drummer Elvin Jones and bassist Jimmy Garrison, and by tenor sax player Dewey Redman. Vocals are provided by Mel Fuhrman. It was recorded at A&R Studios, New York City in two sessions, on April 29 (tracks 1, 2, 4 & 6), and May 7 (tracks 3 & 5), 1968.

== Reception ==
Professional ratings
Review scores
Source	Rating
DownBeat	5/5 stars
The Penguin Guide to Jazz Recordings	3/4 stars

Phil Freeman noted "The interplay between the two saxophonists was fierce, and the rhythm section, borrowed from John Coltrane, combined powerhouse swing with an ineffable gravitas. This feeling of greater grounded-ness is what makes New York is Now! and Love Call unique among Coleman’s discography, whether on Blue Note or otherwise; the tempos aren’t much slower than on his other mid ’60s albums, but they feel somehow heavier here, Jones driving the beat as Garrison strums his bass like a massive guitar. The two albums don’t even seem to exist as separate entities—they feel like two halves of a whole, the compositions all sharing the ebullience and, in their slower moments, the deep feeling of the blues that have marked Ornette’s music since the 1950s".

Allmusic awarded the album three stars and reviewer Thom Jurek stated "New York Is Now is one of the true curiosity pieces in Ornette's catalog". Jurek sees the album finding Coleman "in some sense, at odds with himself" and the rhythm section, which he finds "a lot more modally than harmonically propelled". In particular, he identifies drummer Elvin Jones as sounding restricted by the album's slow tempos. Jurek is also unfavourable about Coleman's violin playing. On the whole, he characterises New York Is Now as "pleasant and amusing if not amazing".

== Release history ==
The album was originally released as an LP by Blue Note Records in 1968. A compact disc version was first issued on January 27, 1990.

== Track listing ==
All compositions by Ornette Coleman.

1. "The Garden of Souls" – 13:57
2. "Toy Dance" – 7:25
3. "Broadway Blues" – 8:40
4. "Broadway Blues" (alternate version) – 7:33 (bonus track on CD reissue)
5. "Round Trip" – 6:17
6. "We Now Interrupt for a Commercial" – 3:19

Recorded at A&R Studios, New York City on April 29 (tracks 1, 2, 4 & 6), and May 7 (tracks 3 & 5), 1968.

== Personnel ==
=== Performance ===
- Ornette Coleman – alto saxophone (tracks 1–5), violin (track 6), trumpet
- Mel Fuhrman – vocals
- Jimmy Garrison – bass
- Elvin Jones – drums
- Dewey Redman – tenor saxophone

=== Production ===
- Michael Cuscuna – liner notes, reissue producer
- Dave Sanders – engineer
- Francis Wolff – producer
