= Broadway Blues (Coleman) =

C. 1968 jazz song by Ornette Coleman

"Broadway Blues" is a jazz/blues composition, composed by Ornette Coleman. It first appeared on his 1968 album New York Is Now!. It was composed in the key of E-flat major. "Broadway Blues" has been cited as a key work in the "Free Jazz" movement which began in the 1960s, a "vehicle" of Coleman's that "offered a freer approach to improvisation than had been used in earlier jazz styles". While the song title features the term blues prominently, the song itself does not employ the twelve-bar chord progression utilized in most blues music.
