= Ornette at 12 =

Live album by Ornette Coleman
- Released: 1968
- Recorded: July 16, 1968
- Genre: Jazz
- Length: 32:31
- Label: Impulse!

Ornette Coleman chronology
| Love Call (1968) | Ornette at 12 (1968) | Crisis (1969) |

Ornette at 12 is an album by the American jazz saxophonist and composer Ornette Coleman released on the Impulse! label in 1969.

In 2017, Real Gone Music reissued Ornette at 12 on CD as part of a compilation that also included Crisis.

== Reception ==
The AllMusic review by Brian Olewnick awarded the album 3 stars and stated "Don't be put off by the critics; Ornette at 12 is a fine, enjoyable album".

Professional ratings
Review scores
| Source | Rating |
|---|---|
| AllMusic | 3/5 stars |
| DownBeat | 4.5/5 stars |
| Rolling Stone | (positive) |

== Track listing ==
All compositions by Ornette Coleman

1. "C.O.D." – 7:25
2. "Rainbows" – 8:56
3. "New York" – 8:13
4. "Bells and Chimes" – 7:15

- Recorded at the Hearst Greek Amphitheatre, University of California, Berkeley, Berkeley, CA, August 11, 1968

== Personnel ==
- Ornette Coleman – alto saxophone, trumpet, violin
- Dewey Redman – tenor saxophone
- Charlie Haden – bass
- Denardo Coleman – drums
