= Scott LaFaro =

American bassist (1936–1961)

- LaFaro in 1958

Background information
- Born: Rocco Scott LaFaro; April 3, 1936; Newark, New Jersey, U.S.
- Died: July 6, 1961 (aged 25) Seneca, New York, U.S.
- Genres: Jazz; bebop; cool jazz; modal jazz; free jazz
- Occupation: Musician
- Instrument: Double bass
- Years active: 1955–1961
- Labels: Riverside; Atlantic
- Formerly of: The Bill Evans Trio
- Website: scottlafaro.com

Rocco Scott LaFaro (April 3, 1936 – July 6, 1961) was an American jazz double bassist known for his work with the Bill Evans Trio. LaFaro broke new ground on the instrument, developing a countermelodic style of accompaniment rather than playing traditional walking basslines, as well as virtuosity that was practically unmatched by any of his contemporaries. Despite his short career and death at the age of 25, he remains one of the most influential jazz bassists, and was ranked number 16 on Bass Player magazine's top 100 bass players of all time.

== Early life ==
LaFaro was born in Newark, New Jersey, the son of a big band musician. He was five when his family moved to Geneva, New York. He started playing piano in elementary school, bass clarinet in middle school, and tenor saxophone when he entered high school. He took up double bass at 18 before entering college because learning a string instrument was required of music education majors. After three months at Ithaca College, he concentrated on bass. He played in groups at the College Spa and Joe's Restaurant on State Street in downtown Ithaca.

== Career ==
Beginning in 1955, he was a member of the Buddy Morrow big band. He left that organization to work in Los Angeles. LaFaro spent most of his days practicing his instrument. He practiced from sheet music for the higher-pitched clarinet to improve his facility with the upper register for bass. Fellow bassist Red Mitchell taught him how to pluck strings with both the index and middle fingers independently. For much of 1958, LaFaro was with pianist/vibraphonist Victor Feldman's band, also recording with Hampton Hawes.

In 1959, after working with trumpeter Chet Baker, bandleader Stan Kenton, vibraphonist Cal Tjader, and clarinetist Benny Goodman, LaFaro returned east and joined Bill Evans, who had recently left the Miles Davis Sextet. With Evans and drummer Paul Motian he developed the counter-melodic style that would come to characterize his playing. Evans, LaFaro, and Motian were committed to the idea of three equal voices in the trio, working together for a singular musical idea and often without any musician explicitly keeping time.

By late 1960, LaFaro was in demand as a bassist. He replaced Charlie Haden as Ornette Coleman's bassist in January 1961. For a time, Haden and LaFaro shared an apartment. He also played in Stan Getz's band between jobs with the Bill Evans trio. Around this time, he received a greeting card from Miles Davis that suggested Davis wanted to hire him.

In June 1961, the Bill Evans trio began two weeks of performances at the Village Vanguard in New York City. The trio attracted attention for its style. The last day was recorded for two albums, Sunday at the Village Vanguard and Waltz for Debby.

== Death ==
LaFaro died in an automobile accident on July 6, 1961, in Seneca, New York, on U.S. Route 20 between Geneva and Canandaigua, four days after accompanying Stan Getz at the Newport Jazz Festival. According to Paul Motian, the death of LaFaro left Bill Evans "numb with grief," "in a state of shock," and "like a ghost." Obsessively, he played "I Loves You, Porgy," a tune that had become synonymous with him and LaFaro. Evans stopped performing for several months.

Evans said that LaFaro had been "one of the most, if not the most outstanding talents in jazz." Legendary bassist Ray Brown added, "This was one of the most talented youngsters I've seen come up in a long time. For his age, he really had it covered. ... It's a shame, really a shame. It's going to set the instrument back ten years." Motian noted, "We were supposed to make a record date with Miles [Davis]: the trio, Bill, myself and Scott. ... We were talking to Miles about it, it was all set up, and then Scott got killed and the whole thing got forgotten."

== Instruments ==
LaFaro started his professional career playing a German-made Mittenwald double bass, but it was stolen in the spring of 1958.

Shortly after, he acquired a bass made in 1825 in Concord, New Hampshire, by Abraham Prescott. The top of the instrument is a three-piece plate of slab-cut fir; the back is a two-piece plate of moderately flamed maple with an ebony inlay at the center joint; the sides are made of matching maple. It has rolled corners on the bottom and very sloped shoulders on the top, making it easier to get in and out of thumb position. LaFaro continued to play this bass until his death. The bass was badly damaged in the automobile accident that killed him, but was eventually restored and is sporadically used in performance to honor LaFaro.

Bill Evans said of LaFaro's Prescott bass: "It had a marvelous sustaining and resonating quality. He would be playing in the hotel room and hit a quadruple stop that was a harmonious sound, and then set the bass on its side and it seemed the sound just rang and rang for so long."

In 2008, Evans's final bassist, Marc Johnson, played LaFaro's bass on an Evans tribute album recorded by Johnson's wife, Eliane Elias, titled Something for You: Eliane Elias Sings & Plays Bill Evans.

== Posthumously released items ==
In 1988, Insights label of RVC Corporation in Japan released Memories for Scotty. The album included five tracks recorded in New York City during 1961 with pianist Don Friedman and drummer Pete LaRoca.

In 2009, Resonance Records reissued five tracks from Memories for Scotty on Pieces of Jade, together with twenty-two minutes of LaFaro and Bill Evans practising "My Foolish Heart" during a rehearsal in 1960. Also in 2009, Helene LaFaro-Fernandez' biography of her brother Scott, titled Jade Visions, was published by the University of North Texas Press, with an extensive discography.

== Honors ==
On March 5, 2014, the City Council of Geneva, New York approved making April 3 Scott LaFaro Day. On April 4, 2014, a ceremony to rename a downtown street Scott LaFaro Drive took place.

According to Joachim Berendt, LaFaro's innovative approach to the bass caused "emancipation", introducing "so many diverse possibilities as would have been thought impossible for the bass only a short time before."

Bassist Charlie Haden recalled:

When I was in L.A., Scotty LaFaro and I roomed together. He would practice for hours: he had all these Sonny Rollins solos he had written out in bass clef! I remained close friends with Scotty in New York, and would go over there to see and admire them, and Scotty and Paul would come over to the Five Spot, too. When Scotty was killed at age 25 (I was 24), I was devastated—I couldn't play for months. I never knew how Scotty felt about my playing until Paul told me later that the first time Paul heard me it was because Scotty had dragged him out in a snowstorm, "You've got to hear this great bass player with Ornette!"

== Discography ==
=== As co-leader ===
- West Coast Days (Fresh Sound, 1958, 1960 [1992]) – with Joe Gordon
- 1960 (PJL, 1960 [2005]) – with Steve Kuhn, Pete La Roca

=== As sideman ===
With Ornette Coleman

- Free Jazz: A Collective Improvisation (Atlantic, 1961)
- Ornette! (Atlantic, 1962)
- The Art of the Improvisers (Atlantic, 1959–60 [1970])
- Twins (Atlantic, 1959–61 [1971])

With Buddy DeFranco

- Live Date! (Verve, 1957 [1958])

With Bill Evans

- Portrait in Jazz (Riverside, 1960)
- Explorations (Riverside, 1961)
- Sunday at the Village Vanguard (Riverside, 1961)
- Waltz for Debby (Riverside, 1961 [1962])
- The Complete Village Vanguard Recordings, 1961 (Riverside, 1961 [2005])
- The 1960 Birdland Sessions (Fresh Sound, 1960 [2005])

With Victor Feldman

- The Arrival of Victor Feldman (Contemporary, 1958)
- Latinsville! (Contemporary, 1960)

With Don Friedman

- Memories for Scotty (Insights, 1961 [1988])
  - Five tracks reissued on Pieces of Jade (Resonance, 2009)

With Herb Geller

- Gypsy (ATCO, 1959)

With Stan Getz and Cal Tjader

- Cal Tjader-Stan Getz Sextet (Fantasy, 1958)

With Hampton Hawes

- For Real! (Contemporary, 1958 [1961])

With Harold Land

- Jazz at the Cellar 1958 (Lone Hill Jazz, 1958 [2007])

With John Lewis, Gunther Schuller and Jim Hall

- Jazz Abstractions (Atlantic, 1960 [1961])

With Booker Little

- Booker Little (Time, 1961)

With Pat Moran McCoy

- This Is Pat Moran (Audio Fidelity, 1957 [1958])
  - Eight tracks reissued under LaFaro's name as The Legendary Scott LaFaro (Audio Fidelity, 1978)

With Marty Paich

- The Broadway Bit (Warner Bros., 1959)

With Tony Scott

- Sung Heroes (Sunnyside, 1959 [1986]) – with Bill Evans, Paul Motian
