= Tomorrow Is the Question! =

Studio album by Ornette Coleman
- Released: November 1959
- Recorded: January 16, February 23 and March 9–10, 1959
- Studio: Contemporary's Studio, Los Angeles, U.S.
- Genre: Jazz
- Length: 42:22
- Label: Contemporary
- Producer: Lester Koenig

Ornette Coleman chronology
| Something Else!!!! (1958) | Tomorrow Is the Question! (1959) | The Shape of Jazz to Come (1959) |

Tomorrow Is the Question!, subtitled The New Music of Ornette Coleman!, is the second album by American jazz musician Ornette Coleman, originally released in 1959 by Contemporary Records. It was Coleman's last album for the label before he began a highly successful multi-album series for Atlantic Records in 1959.

As well as regular sideman Don Cherry on trumpet, the album features bassists Percy Heath and Red Mitchell, and drummer Shelly Manne.

== Reception ==
Professional ratings
Review scores
| Source | Rating |
|---|---|
| AllMusic | 4/5 stars |
| Yahoo! Music | (favorable) |
| The Rolling Stone Jazz Record Guide | 4/5 stars |
| The Penguin Guide to Jazz Recordings | 3/4 stars |

The album generally received better press than did Something Else!!!!. AllMusic's Thom Jurek notes the interplay of Coleman and Cherry on tunes he described as "knottier and tighter in their arrangement style" than those of the previous album. Ekkehard Jost, in his book Free Jazz, noted that "as early as the 1958/59 recordings for Contemporary, the most pronounced features of Coleman's saxophone playing were set. His bent for improvisations that were largely unrestrained harmonically is evident, even in pieces whose outward make-up is anything but revolutionary." Others have hailed the removal of the piano as a positive move: for Mike Andrews, "a marked conceptual improvement can be immediately recognized" as the lack of harmonic instrument allowed greater freedom for the soloists.

== Release history ==
Released as an LP by Contemporary Records in 1959. Reissued in 1991 on the Original Jazz Classics label.

== Track listing ==
All pieces written by Ornette Coleman.

1. "Tomorrow Is the Question!" – 3:09
2. "Tears Inside" – 5:00
3. "Mind and Time" – 3:08
4. "Compassion" – 4:37
5. "Giggin'" – 3:19
6. "Rejoicing" – 4:01
7. "Lorraine" – 5:55
8. "Turnaround" – 7:58
9. "Endless" – 5:18

Track 7 recorded on January 16, 1959; tracks 8 and 9 on February 23; tracks 1–6 recorded on March 9 and 10, 1959.

== Personnel ==
=== Performance ===
- Ornette Coleman – alto saxophone
- Don Cherry – trumpet
- Percy Heath – bass (tracks 1–6)
- Shelly Manne – drums
- Red Mitchell – bass (tracks 7–9)

=== Production ===
- Roy DuNann – engineer
- Nat Hentoff – liner notes
- Lester Koenig – producer
