= Jazz Abstractions =

Studio album by John Lewis, Gunther Schuller and Jim Hall
- Released: ca. November 1961
- Recorded: December 19–20, 1960; NYC
- Genre: Jazz
- Length: 36:06
- Label: Atlantic; SD 1365
- Producer: John Lewis, Nesuhi Ertegun

John Lewis chronology
The Wonderful World of Jazz (1960)	Jazz Abstractions (1961)	Original Sin (1961)

Jazz Abstractions (subtitled John Lewis Presents Contemporary Music: Compositions by Gunther Schuller and Jim Hall) is a third stream album combining elements of jazz and classical music recorded in late 1960 for the Atlantic label.

== Reception ==
Professional ratings
Review scores
Source	Rating
Allmusic	4/5 stars

Allmusic awarded the album 4 stars stating: "One of the most successful third stream efforts ...This is very interesting music".

== Track listing ==
All compositions by Gunther Schuller except as indicated

1. "Abstraction" - 4:06
2. "Piece for Guitar & Strings" (Jim Hall) - 6:22
3. "Variants on a Theme of John Lewis (Django)" - 10:15
  1. "Variant I" - 5:27
  2. "Variant II" - 1:38
  3. "Variant III" - 3:10
4. "Variants on a Theme of Thelonious Monk (Criss-Cross)" - 15:23
  1. "Variant I" - 6:22
  2. "Variant II" - 1:49
  3. "Variant III" - 4:12
  4. "Variant IV" - 3:00

== Personnel ==
- Gunther Schuller - arranger, conductor
- Jim Hall - guitar
- Ornette Coleman - alto saxophone (tracks 1 & 4)
- Eric Dolphy - alto saxophone, bass clarinet, flute (tracks 3 & 4)
- Robert DiDomenica - flute (tracks 3 & 4)
- Bill Evans - piano (tracks 3 & 4)
- Eddie Costa - vibraphone (tracks 3 & 4)
- Charles Libove, Roland Vamos - violin
- Alfred Brown (track 2), Harry Zaratzian - viola
- Joseph Tekula - cello
- Alvin Brehm (track 1), George Duvivier (tracks 3 & 4), Scott LaFaro - bass
- Sticks Evans - drums (tracks 1, 3 & 4)
- John Jagel - cover painting
- John Jagel & Robert Slutzky - cover design (credited as Jagel & Slutzky Graphics)
