= Lonely Woman (composition) =

Instrumental by Ornette Coleman

from the album The Shape of Jazz to Come
- Released: 1959
- Recorded: May 22, 1959
- Length: 4:59
- Label: Atlantic (1317)
- Composer: Ornette Coleman
- Producer: Nesuhi Ertegun

"Lonely Woman" is a jazz composition by Ornette Coleman. Coleman's recording of it was the opening track on his 1959 Atlantic Records album The Shape of Jazz to Come. Alongside Coleman's alto saxophone, the recording featured Don Cherry on cornet, Charlie Haden on double bass and Billy Higgins on drums.

== Origin ==
In an interview with Jacques Derrida, Coleman spoke of the origin of the composition:

Before becoming known as a musician, when I worked in a big department store, one day, during my lunch break, I came across a gallery where someone had painted a very rich white woman who had absolutely everything that you could desire in life, and she had the most solitary expression in the world. I had never been confronted with such solitude, and when I got back home, I wrote a piece that I called "Lonely Woman."

== Other versions ==
Haden and Cherry revisited the song on Old and New Dreams (ECM, 1979), Haden doing so again on Etudes (1987) and In Angel City (1988).

Pianist John Lewis first recorded the song in January 1962 with the Modern Jazz Quartet for their album of the same name which was one of the earliest recorded covers of a Coleman number. Later that year, in July, Lewis recorded it again for his album European Encounter.

Vocal versions, with lyrics written by Margo Guryan, have been recorded by Chris Connor (1962), Freda Payne (1964, on After the Lights Go Down Low and Much More!!!) and Carola Standertskjöld (1966). A version with different lyrics by Chris Karrer appeared on the 1974 album Hijack by the German rock band Amon Düül II.
