= Love Call (album) =

Studio album by Ornette Coleman
- Released: February 1971
- Recorded: April 29 & May 7, 1968
- Genre: Jazz
- Length: 39:58; 53:23 (CD)
- Label: Blue Note
- Producer: Francis Wolff

Ornette Coleman chronology
New York Is Now! (1968)	Love Call (1971)	Ornette at 12 (1968)

Love Call is an album by the American jazz saxophonist and composer Ornette Coleman recorded in 1968 and released on the Blue Note label.

== Reception ==
Phil Freeman noted "The interplay between the two saxophonists was fierce, and the rhythm section, borrowed from John Coltrane, combined powerhouse swing with an ineffable gravitas. This feeling of greater grounded-ness is what makes New York is Now! and Love Call unique among Coleman’s discography, whether on Blue Note or otherwise; the tempos aren’t much slower than on his other mid ’60s albums, but they feel somehow heavier here, Jones driving the beat as Garrison strums his bass like a massive guitar. The two albums don’t even seem to exist as separate entities—they feel like two halves of a whole, the compositions all sharing the ebullience and, in their slower moments, the deep feeling of the blues that have marked Ornette’s music since the 1950s".

Allmusic, awarded the album three stars and Thom Jurek stated "the other half of the New York Is Now session, which is, in a sense, ridiculous. Blue Note issued two records when they really had one" but also more favorably said, "The title track is perhaps Coleman's finest moment on the trumpet. "

Professional ratings
Review scores
Source	Rating
Allmusic	3/5 stars
The Penguin Guide to Jazz Recordings	3/4 stars

== Track listing ==
All compositions by Ornette Coleman

1. "Airborne" – 10:30
2. "Check Out Time" – 8:22
3. "Check Out Time" [Alternate Version] – 7:57 Bonus track on CD reissue
4. "Open to the Public" – 8:05
5. "Love Call" – 8:45
6. "Love Call" [Alternate Version] – 5:31 Bonus track on CD reissue
7. "Just for You" – 4:13

- Recorded at A&R Studios, New York City on April 29 (tracks 1, 3, 4 & 6), and May 7 (tracks 2, 5 & 7), 1968.

== Personnel ==
- Ornette Coleman - alto saxophone, trumpet
- Dewey Redman - tenor saxophone
- Jimmy Garrison - bass
- Elvin Jones - drums
