= Crisis (Ornette Coleman album) =

Live album by Ornette Coleman
- Released: June 1972
- Recorded: March 22, 1969
- Venue: New York University, New York City
- Genre: Jazz
- Length: 43:56
- Label: Impulse!

Ornette Coleman chronology
Ornette at 12 (1968)	Crisis (1972)	Friends and Neighbors: Live at Prince Street (1970)

Crisis is a live album by the American jazz saxophonist and composer Ornette Coleman recorded at New York University in 1969 and released on the Impulse! label.

In 2017, Real Gone Music reissued Crisis on CD as part of a compilation that also included Ornette at 12.

== Reception ==
Brian Olewnick's AllMusic review awarded the album 4½ stars and stated: "Crisis somehow lacks the reputation of the revolutionary Coleman albums from early in his career, but on purely musical grounds it ranks among his most satisfying works".

Professional ratings
Review scores
Source	Rating
AllMusic	4.5/5 stars
The Rolling Stone Jazz Record Guide	4/5 stars

== Track listing ==
All compositions by Ornette Coleman except as indicated

1. "Broken Shadows" – 5:59
2. "Comme Il Faut" – 14:26
3. "Song for Ché" (Charlie Haden) – 11:32
4. "Space Jungle" – 5:20
5. "Trouble in the East" – 6:39

- Recorded at New York University in New York City on March 22, 1969.

== Personnel ==
- Ornette Coleman – alto saxophone, trumpet, violin
- Don Cherry – cornet, Indian flute
- Dewey Redman – tenor saxophone, clarinet
- Charlie Haden – bass
- Denardo Coleman – drums
