= Something Else!!!! =

Studio album by Ornette Coleman
- Released: September 1958
- Recorded: February 10, 22 & March 24, 1958
- Genre: Free jazz
- Length: 42:15
- Label: Contemporary
- Producer: Lester Koenig

Ornette Coleman chronology
Something Else!!!! (1958)	Tomorrow Is the Question! (1959)

Something Else!!!! (subtitled The Music of Ornette Coleman) is the debut album by jazz saxophonist Ornette Coleman. It was released by Contemporary Records in September 1958. According to AllMusic, the album "shook up the jazz world", revitalizing the union of blues and jazz and restoring "blues to their 'classic' beginnings in African music". It is unusual in Coleman's output in that it features a conventional bebop quintet instrumentation (saxophone, cornet, piano, bass and drums); after this album, Coleman would omit the piano, creating a starker and more fluid sound.

== History ==
While working as an elevator operator in a department store in Los Angeles, Ornette assembled a group of musicians—teenaged cornet player Don Cherry, double bass player Charlie Haden, and drummers Ed Blackwell and Billy Higgins—with whom he could explore his unusual jazz compositions. Coleman was introduced to music producer Lester Koenig of Contemporary Records by a bebop bassist friend of Cherry's, Red Mitchell, who thought Koenig might be interested in purchasing Coleman's songs. When other musicians found the tunes too challenging, Coleman was invited to perform the compositions himself.

== Critical opinion ==
Professional ratings
Review scores
Source	Rating
Allmusic	4.5/5 stars
The Rolling Stone Jazz Record Guide	4/5 stars
The Penguin Guide to Jazz Recordings	3/4 stars

Though often controversial at the time, music from Coleman's first album is now generally well received. Rolling Stone commented admiringly on the composer's "genuinely original voice" and "freakishly structured tunes". All About Jazz reviewer John Barrett Jr. cautions that, though dissonant, this album is not the first of the free jazz movement with which Coleman is so associated. Nevertheless, in 2007, All About Jazz credited the album with introducing "a new era in jazz", transforming the genre by demonstrating a style of music "freed from the prevailing conventions of harmony, rhythm and melody".

Pianist Ethan Iverson has written at length about this album and other recordings from Coleman's early period. His argument is that on his early albums, Coleman's attempts to break free of chords and chorus-structures are hampered by sidemen who are unwilling to follow his cue.

== Release history ==
Originally released under the Contemporary imprint in mono and then later (either in 1959 or 1960) issued with a different cover photo and in stereo. The stereo remix of the album was re-released in 1992 on LP, compact disc and compact cassette in collaboration between Contemporary and OJC.

== Track listing ==
All tracks composed by Ornette Coleman.

1. "Invisible" – 4:11
2. "The Blessing" – 4:45
3. "Jayne" – 7:17
4. "Chippie" – 5:37
5. "The Disguise" – 2:46
6. "Angel Voice" – 4:19
7. "Alpha" – 4:09
8. "When Will the Blues Leave?" – 4:58
9. "The Sphinx" – 4:13

== Personnel ==
- Ornette Coleman – alto saxophone
- Don Cherry – cornet
- Walter Norris – piano
- Don Payne – double bass
- Billy Higgins – drums
- Lester Koenig – producer
- Roy DuNann – engineer
- Nat Hentoff – liner notes
