= Change of the Century =

Studio album by Ornette Coleman
- Released: May 1960
- Recorded: October 8–9, 1959
- Genre: Free jazz
- Length: 40:55
- Label: Atlantic
- Producer: Nesuhi Ertegün

Ornette Coleman chronology
The Shape of Jazz to Come (1959)	Change of the Century (1960)	This Is Our Music (1961)

Change of the Century is a studio album by jazz saxophonist Ornette Coleman. It was released through Atlantic Records in May 1960. It sold very well from soon after its release. Recording sessions for the album took place on October 8 and 9, 1959, in New York City.

In the liner notes, Coleman stressed that the album was "a group effort," and wrote: "When our group plays, before we start out to play, we do not have any idea what the end result will be. Each player is free to contribute what he feels in the music at any given moment... our final results depend entirely on the musicianship, emotional make-up and taste of the individual member."

== Reception ==
Professional ratings
Review scores
Source	Rating
AllMusic	5/5 stars
The Rolling Stone Album Guide	5/5 stars
The Rolling Stone Jazz Record Guide	5/5 stars
The Penguin Guide to Jazz Recordings	4/4 stars

Writer A. B. Spellman commented: "this is a very disciplined group of musicians. They had complete intuition about where the other one was going to go. The sympathy within the group was absolutely extreme and that's hard to develop." He noted: "This record catches them just as they are sort of rising toward their peak. It has all the excitement and all the newness."

AllMusic's Steve Huey stated that the album showcases "a group that was growing ever more confident in its revolutionary approach and the chemistry in the bandmembers' interplay," and remarked: "Coleman was hitting his stride and finally letting out all the ideas and emotions that had previously been constrained by tradition. That vitality makes it an absolutely essential purchase and... some of the most brilliant work of Coleman's career."

C. Michael Bailey, writing for All About Jazz, called the title track "a wild phantasm of notes that are to 'free jazz' what trumpeter Dizzy Gillespie's 'Bebop' was for that virtuosic genre," and commented: "finally things are really beginning to come apart at the seams... Coleman has fully gained his traction and is now ready."

== Track listing ==
All tracks are written by Ornette Coleman.

Side one
No.	Title	Date	Length
1.	"Ramblin'"	October 9	6:39
2.	"Free"	October 9	6:24
3.	"The Face of the Bass"	October 8	6:59

Side two
No.	Title	Date	Length
1.	"Forerunner"	October 9	5:16
2.	"Bird Food"	October 8	5:31
3.	"Una Muy Bonita"	October 8	6:02
4.	"Change of the Century"	October 8	4:41

== Personnel ==
- Ornette Coleman – alto saxophone
- Don Cherry – pocket trumpet
- Charlie Haden – bass
- Billy Higgins – drums

== Bibliography ==
- DeCurtis, Anthony; Henke, James; George-Warren, Holly, eds. (1992). The Rolling Stone Album Guide (3rd ed.). Random House. ISBN 0679737294.
- Cox, Christoph; Warner, Daniel (2004). Audio Culture: Readings in Modern Music. Continuum. ISBN 0826416144.
