= Radio Recorders =

US recording studio in Los Angeles

Coordinates: 34.0904847°N 118.3422266°W

Radio Recorders, Inc. was an American recording studio located in Los Angeles, California. During the 1940s and 1950s, Radio Recorders was one of the largest independent recording studios in the world. Notable musicians who recorded at Radio Recorders include Billie Holiday, Charlie Parker, Sam Cooke, Jimmie Rodgers, Louis Armstrong, Mario Lanza, Patti Page, Elvis Presley, Jimi Hendrix, Frankie Yankovic, Frank Zappa, Paul Frees and the Carpenters among others. In its prime, the studio was considered the best recording facility in Los Angeles, with two large studios and some smaller ones, as well as disc mastering facilities.

== History ==
=== Radio Recorders ===
Originally founded in 1933 at 932 N. Western Avenue, Radio Recorders established itself at 7000 Santa Monica Boulevard by 1949. During the 1940s and 1950s, Radio Recorders was responsible for recording transcriptions of countless radio shows, both network and local, for delayed broadcast in the Western states. Since this was prior to magnetic tape recording, the recordings were made on and played back from lacquer-coated aluminum discs. Studio C was Radio Recorders nerve center with at least six recording lathes and turntables and an "on-the-air" playback turntable protected by a railing so that it would not be bumped while it was replaying a program on-air. The recording lathes were shock-mounted in sand to prevent rumble from the streetcars on Santa Monica Boulevard. Studio C could handle several programs at once, 24 hours a day, and often with a single engineer on duty. Telephone lines ran to all the important stations and the networks.

Most of the major labels used Radio Recorders well into the 1960s. RCA Victor, Columbia, Capitol, and Decca utilized Radio Recorders prior to building their own West Coast facilities, and remained the choice of many independent labels and both popular and classical artists, from Stravinsky to Elvis.

Radio Recorders was also where most commercial jingles were recorded, and their dominance of this market segment strengthened in 1959 when their affiliate, MP-TV Services, acquired the rights to the sound effect, jingle and commercial aid libraries of Standard Radio Transcription, Inc.

In 1960, Radio Recorders merged with Universal Recorders, located at 6757 Hollywood Blvd. and built a new studio at 1441 North McCadden Place, which they called their Sunset-Highland Division. Radio-Universal Recorders was the largest recording studio in the United States.

=== Radio Recorders Annex ===
In 1946, Radio Recorders remodeled a former RCA Victor warehouse located at 1032 North Sycamore Avenue into a large studio capable of handling approximately fifty musicians. This studio was known as Radio Recorders Annex, or, within the industry, just "The Annex," after a legendary studio that Victor had built in the warehouse back in the 1930s.

In 1962 H.B. Barnum and Bill Aken chose The Annex to record their big band version of "Goody, Goody" for Governor Goodwin J. (Goodie) Knight's re-election campaign. The same year, Bill Aken recorded the classic "Theme For Shock Theater" with engineer Phil Yeend.

In 1965, Radio Recorders' engineer, Thorne Nogar, purchased The Annex and started his own independent Annex Studios, which attracted a distinguished clientele as a full-service studio, including mastering. For many years, Lawrence Welk pre-recorded the music for his popular television show, becoming the most important client; in addition, in the 1960s and 1970s Annex mastered for such labels as Uni Records, GNP Crescendo Records, Dot Records, and Ranwood Records, as well as cutting early pressings of Barbra Streisand's hit single "The Way We Were."

In January 1986, Record Plant opened at the Annex location.

=== Studio 56 ===
In the late 1980s the studio was reopened by Paul Schwartz as Studio 56. At that time, artists such as Guns & Roses, Sugar Ray, Toni Braxton, Brandy, No Doubt and others recorded there. The documentary Standing in the Shadows of Motown was also partially filmed there. Kenneth Crouch, Keith Crouch and Leon Sylvers were all house producers there at that time.

In 2002, the studio gained two new partners, Pride Hutchison and Michael Dumas who brought the studio back to life under the original Radio Recorders name, and in 2004, the city of Los Angeles installed a street sign describing the historical significance of the site.

From 2002 to 2008 the studio welcomed many great projects and clients including Natalie Cole, Dwight Yoakam, Lucinda Williams, Lil' Jon, Xzibit, Annie Lennox and many more.

The facility closed in 2008. Today the sign describing the historical significance of Radio Recorders still remains on the corner of Santa Monica and Orange.
