= Studio recording =

Recording made in a studio

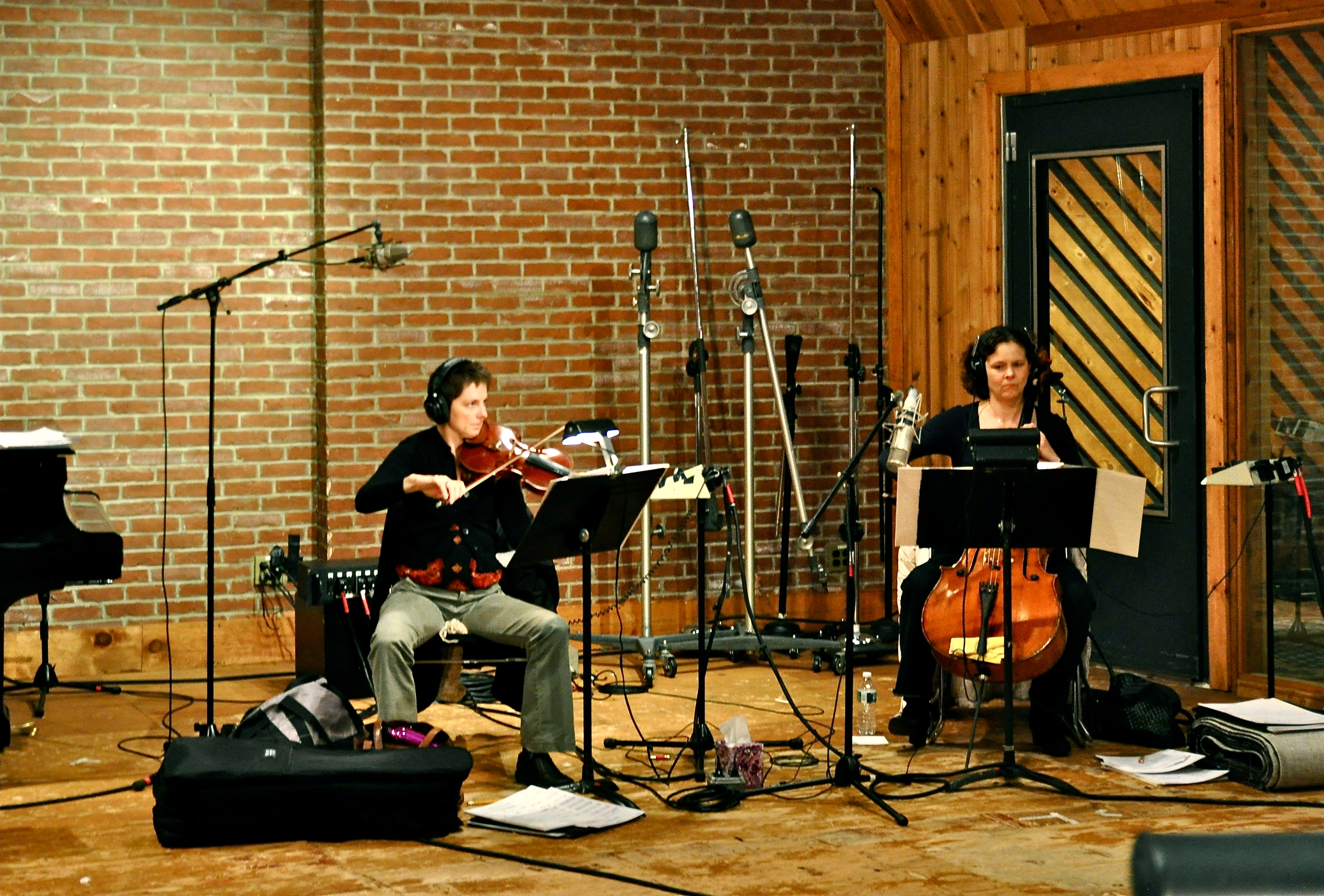
Violinist and cellist in recording studio for the Queen of the Mist cast album.

A studio recording, or a recording session is any recording made in a studio, as opposed to a live recording, which is usually made in a concert venue or a theatre, with an audience attending the performance.

== Studio cast recordings ==
In the case of Broadway musicals, the term studio cast recording applies to a recording of the show which does not feature the cast of either a stage production or film version of the show.

The practice has existed since before the advent of Broadway cast albums in 1943. That year the songs from Rodgers and Hammerstein's Oklahoma!, performed by the show's cast, were released on a multi-record 78-RPM album by American Decca. (London original cast albums have existed since the early days of recording, however, and there are recordings in existence of excerpts from the Gilbert and Sullivan operas and such shows as The Desert Song, Sunny, and Show Boat, all performed by their original London stage casts.)

=== History ===
Before 1943, musicals were recorded in the U.S. with what might be termed studio casts, although in many cases, such as those of Walter Huston from Knickerbocker Holiday and Helen Morgan from Show Boat, singer-actors from a musical did make recordings of songs from the shows they appeared in. Another such example is Ethel Merman, who recorded virtually all of the songs that she made famous, even when there was no original Broadway cast album of a smash hit that she had starred in, as is the case with Girl Crazy, Panama Hattie, and Anything Goes. Paul Robeson, who appeared in several productions of Show Boat (though not the original Broadway production), made many recordings of the song Ol' Man River from the show.

However, early "studio cast" albums were very different from those made today, or even those made from 1950 onward. Many of them were simply a collection of songs from a show, and made no attempt to recreate what a performance of the show was actually like. (In the liner notes for the new studio cast recording of Rodgers and Hammerstein's 1947 semi-flop Allegro, former Columbia Records president Goddard Lieberson is given credit for virtually inventing the idea of a studio cast recording.) David Hummel, the author of “The Collector’s Guide to the American Musical Theatre” (Scarecrow Press, 1984) was the first person to come up with the term “studio cast” in lists he was making of Broadway recordings. In these lists, which date back to the 1950s, he documented Original Cast (OC), Soundtrack (ST) and when the Goddard Lieberson cast recordings came out he wasn't sure how to catalog them so the term “studio cast” (SC) came into being. Author Stanley Green even wrote to Mr. Hummel asking if he could use the term. Mr. Hummel responded that he didn't own the term; it was just something he came up with for his lists so the recordings could be cataloged.

Beginning in 1943, then-current revivals of musicals began to be recorded with their stage casts, a custom that persists today. Therefore, we have recordings of the 1943 cast of Rodgers and Hart's A Connecticut Yankee, the 1946 cast of Kern and Hammerstein's Show Boat and the 1951 cast of George and Ira Gershwin's Of Thee I Sing, all of them pre-1943 musicals. But there are no actual original Broadway cast albums of any of these shows.

Studio cast recordings have become especially useful in the era of compact discs after being overshadowed for years by original cast albums - in nearly all cases, moderate to large numbers of songs (or instrumental music) were left out of original cast albums of older shows because there was simply no room for all of them on a single LP, even one that lasted 50 minutes. The extended length of a typical CD makes it possible to include all the songs and music from one show on one or more discs, and studio casts have had to be the ones to record new albums of older shows, since, in many cases, original cast members are either long retired or have died.

In the past, studio cast albums have almost invariably used different orchestrations and vocal arrangements from those heard in the show, but with interest growing in the way shows from the past first sounded on Broadway, these albums are now nearly always recorded using the original orchestral and vocal arrangements of the shows in question, especially after the 1982 discovery in a Secaucus, New Jersey Warner Bros. warehouse of the original manuscripts of many classic Broadway shows in their original orchestrations. One such example is the aforementioned Of Thee I Sing, which was recorded on CD with its original orchestrations and vocal arrangements for the first time in 1987, featuring a cast headed by Larry Kert and Maureen McGovern.

Occasionally, film scores were recorded with studio casts, especially in the days before soundtrack albums. One such example is Decca's 1939 album of songs from The Wizard of Oz, which featured Judy Garland singing Over the Rainbow and the deleted song The Jitterbug, but the Ken Darby Singers singing the rest of the score.

== The process ==
Click tracks (i.e. metronome recordings at a certain tempo) are often used to keep the musicians in perfect time; these can be played in musicians' ears through headphones, and so, barring any bleed, will not be picked up by the microphones and thus be silent on the final track.

In bands, different groups have different orders of recording instruments. Some record the entire group at the same time, as would be played in a live performance, though this can cause some instruments to be picked up on the microphones of others, which can complicate mixing: partition screens are available to counter this. Others choose to add tracks one by one. For example, a group may choose to have the drum and bass guitar record first, so that the following instruments keep in time, and can play to a better 'feel' of the song. Vocals are usually added last, only followed by backing vocals or solos, which may change or be complicated, meaning that multiple attempts could be useful before deciding on a final.

Scratch tracks are tracks that are played through roughly at first, so other musicians have something to work with, and can play to support the other parts. However, it is not final, and once the other musicians have recorded their parts, it will be rerecorded, when the musician will be able to play against the strengths of the parts already recorded, and have a better grasp of the feel of the music. In the previous example, the bass guitar part that was recorded first might just be a scratch track, to help the drummer get a feel of where emphasis and space in the song is.
