= Pocket trumpet =

Brass musical instrument

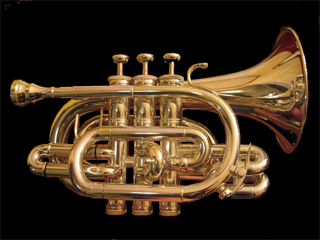
Pocket trumpet in B-flat, with a 5-inch (13 cm) standard size bell and medium-large bore

The pocket trumpet is a B♭ or C trumpet that is constructed with the tubing wound into a much smaller coil than a standard trumpet, generally with a smaller-diameter bell. It is not a standard instrument in a concert band or orchestra and is generally regarded as a novelty. It has been used by soloists in jazz (Don Cherry played the similar pocket cornet) or other ensembles to add flair and variety.

== History ==
The concept of reducing the brass instrument size without reducing the resonating tube length can be seen in several 19th-century models of cornet. Pocket cornets have been constructed since the 1870s.

Pocket trumpets are sometimes played as auxiliary instruments by soloists in jazz and dixieland bands, as well as for some specific studio recording demands. Don Cherry's work with the Ornette Coleman quartet is probably the best known example of pocket trumpet playing.

== Design and properties ==
Tonal characteristics and playability vary due to differences in design. There are two basic design approaches to pocket trumpets:

- Reduced bell and bore sizes
- Standard bell and bore sizes

Models with reduced bell and bore sizes originated in the 19th century, and usually suffer from poor intonation and severely hindered dynamic and timbral range. Regular trumpet mutes cannot be used since their bells are not a standard size. Models with standard bell and bore sizes originally appeared in the US as late as 1968, mostly following the design of trumpet builder Louis Duda (one-piece hand-hammered "5X" bell, cornet-wound lead pipe, straight-back first valve slide with thumb-throw, fold-back third slide), manufactured by the Benge Trumpet company.

== Standard features ==
- Bell diameter: 11–13 cm (4.5–5 in)
- Bore: Medium-large 11.7 mm (0.460 in) or large 11.9 mm (0.468 in)
- Height: 17–18 cm (6.5–7 in)
- Length: 24 cm (9.5 in)

== Famous players ==
"Dirty" Walter A. Kibby II of the band Fishbone uses a pocket trumpet for all live shows and recordings.

Onetime Elevator/French Toast drummer and former Fugazi roadie Jerry Busher plays a pocket trumpet on The Evens' song "Competing With The Till", which is on The Evens' The Odds album.

New Orleans artist Shamarr Allen plays a Kanstul pocket trumpet with a raised bell in most performances.

Donald Eugene Cherry, known professionally as Don Cherry, free jazz trumpeter, played on a F. Besson Meha pocket cornet.

== Common manufacturers and models ==
- TRISTAR TR-05 B♭ (India)
- Cecilio (Mendini) 77-MT B♭ (China)
- CarolBrass Pocket CPT-3000 and CPT-4000 B♭ and C (Taiwan)
- CarolBrass Mini CPT-1000 B♭ and C (Taiwan)
- Taylor Trumpets The Pocket Pro 2 B♭ (UK)
- Taylor Trumpets The Phat Puppy Pocket Flugelhorn (UK)
- Amati ATR 314I B♭ (Czech Republic)
- Stagg 77-MT B♭ (Flemish manufacture sold to the world)
- Jupiter 416 B♭ (Taiwan)
- Benge Colibri B♭ (United States)
- Kanstul CCT-905 B♭ (United States)
- Stomvi Pocket Forte 5009 B♭ (Spain)
- Schagerl PT-200 B♭ (Austria)
- Kühnl & Hoyer “Pocket“ Malte Burba B♭ (Germany)
- Best Brass Artemis B♭ (Japan)
- Brasspire P7 B♭ (Japan)
- Weril EP4072 B♭ (Brazil)
