= Old and New Dreams =

American jazz group

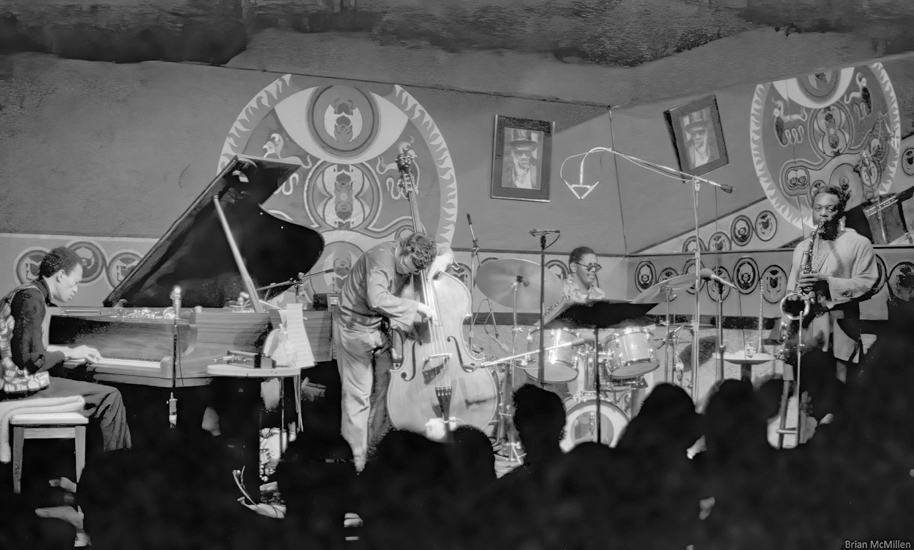
- Old and New Dreams (1978)

Background information
- Genres: Jazz
- Years active: 1976–1987
- Labels: Black Saint, ECM
- Past members: Ed Blackwell; Don Cherry; Charlie Haden; Dewey Redman

Old and New Dreams was an American jazz group that was active from 1976 to 1987. The group was composed of tenor saxophone player Dewey Redman (doubling on musette), bassist Charlie Haden, trumpeter Don Cherry and drummer Ed Blackwell. All of the members were former sidemen of free jazz progenitor and alto saxophonist Ornette Coleman, and the group played a mix of Coleman's compositions and originals by the band members.

The members of Old and New Dreams had deep personal and musical ties to Coleman. Dewey Redman attended high school in Fort Worth, Texas, where his classmates and bandmates were Coleman, Charles Moffett, and Prince Lasha. He was featured on a number of Coleman's albums, beginning with New York Is Now! and Love Call, both recorded in the spring of 1968. Ed Blackwell met Coleman in New Orleans in 1949, and the two later shared a house in Los Angeles. Blackwell joined Coleman's band in 1959 during a gig at the Five Spot, replacing Billy Higgins, who lost his cabaret card. He made his first recorded appearance with Coleman in 1960 on This Is Our Music. Don Cherry met Coleman in the mid-1950s while playing in a band called the Jazz Messiahs, and, after joining his band, was featured on over a dozen albums with Coleman, beginning with the saxophonist's 1958 debut recording Something Else!!!!. Charlie Haden met Coleman shortly after the 1958 recording session, and at the time was playing with Paul Bley. In the fall of 1958, Coleman, Cherry, Haden, and Higgins joined Bley for a six-week job at the Hilcrest Club in Los Angeles, recording the material released in the 1970s on Live at the Hilcrest Club 1958 and Coleman Classics Volume 1, after which the four continued as a quartet, with Blackwell later replacing Higgins. Cherry, Haden, and Blackwell appeared with John Coltrane on the album The Avant-Garde, recorded in 1960 and featuring three Coleman compositions, and continued to record extensively with Coleman through the 1960s and 1970s.

In the early 1970s, Redman and Haden, along with drummer Paul Motian, joined Keith Jarrett's band, while Cherry and Blackwell toured and recorded together. The four also appeared together on the Coleman albums Science Fiction and Broken Shadows, recorded in 1971. In 1975, Coleman formed his electric band Prime Time, and shortly afterward, Jarrett's group disbanded. The following year, after the notion of reforming the acoustic Coleman quartet fell through, the four recorded their first album as Old and New Dreams.

Regarding the group's origins and approach to improvisation, Haden commented: "before we met, all of us were already hearing and wanting to play things that other musicians weren't playing... We were after something like pure spontaneity... improvising on the feeling of the tunes we were playing rather than on the chord structures. When we would try that individually, back in the mid-1950s, the musicians we were playing with would get upset. But when we finally got together, we were able to play the most spontaneous music we'd ever played." He continued: "Some people still think that we just get up and start improvising... but our playing has its own structure. Instead of following a regular chord pattern, we use the melodies of the compositions as a guide and create new chord structures every time we play them. That's why playing really challenging compositions, Ornette's and our own, is so important to us. In a similar vein, Redman stated: "the improvisation... relates to the melody, whatever the melody is stated at the beginning, and you, when you improvise around that... you're relating to that structure. However, that can be very complex, because... you might be thinking of the melody, but you might also be thinking of... different phrases that go with the melody or maybe go against the melody."

The group toured intermittently over a period of roughly eleven years, and released two records on the German jazz label ECM: a self-titled release in 1979 and Playing, recorded live, a year later. These discs were bookended by a pair of discs on the Italian Black Saint label: a studio record from 1976 (also self-titled) and 1987's A Tribute to Blackwell, capturing a performance at a birthday celebration for Blackwell. A 1986 performance, with Paul Motian substituting for Blackwell, was released by Condition West Recordings in 2017 with the title Old and New Dreams Live in Saalfelden, 1986. Cherry and Blackwell later appeared (without Redman) on Haden's 1989 album The Montreal Tapes: with Don Cherry and Ed Blackwell, and the entire group reunited for the last time in 1991 at Alice Tully Hall for an event called "Dewey's Circle", where they were joined by pianist Geri Allen.

Blackwell died in 1992, Cherry in 1995, Redman in 2006, and Haden in 2014.

In 2017, Dewey Redman's son, saxophonist Joshua Redman, recorded Still Dreaming as a tribute to Old and New Dreams.

== Reception ==
Reviewer Scott Yanow called Old and New Dreams "one of the late '80s finest groups", and stated that "they joined The Mingus Dynasty, Sphere, and Dameronia as bands that weren't simply repertory units, but evolving groups using a great composer's material as a starting point for their own peerless interpretations." Stanley Crouch wrote that the band "made it clear... how very different what [Ornette] Coleman had introduced into jazz was from the bulk of the music played by those usually said to be in the jazz vanguard. They swung, they were melody makers, and the whole tradition of jazz flowed through their playing exactly as it did from the best of the musicians who had come forward since the bebop movement of the forties."

Robert Palmer stated: "The band's style is as broadly eclectic as the players' disparate personalities and experiences. But Old and New Dreams is also a kind of floating conservatory that keeps the music of the early Coleman quartets - the original 'free jazz' - alive and before the public." Francis Davis wrote: "If the myth that Coleman had to be physically present in order for his music to be played properly persisted in some quarters, Old and New Dreams dispelled it once and for all. The band played Coleman's music with a joy and a sense of purpose that bore witness to Coleman's acuity as a composer. The success of Old and New Dreams showed that the music that had once been both hailed and reviled as the wave of the future had taken a firm enough hold in the past to inspire nostalgia."

== Discography ==
Studio albums:

- Old and New Dreams (Black Saint, 1977)
- Old and New Dreams (ECM, 1979)

Live albums:

- Playing (ECM, 1980)
- A Tribute to Blackwell (Black Saint, 1987)
