= Asha Puthli =

Indian singer-songwriter

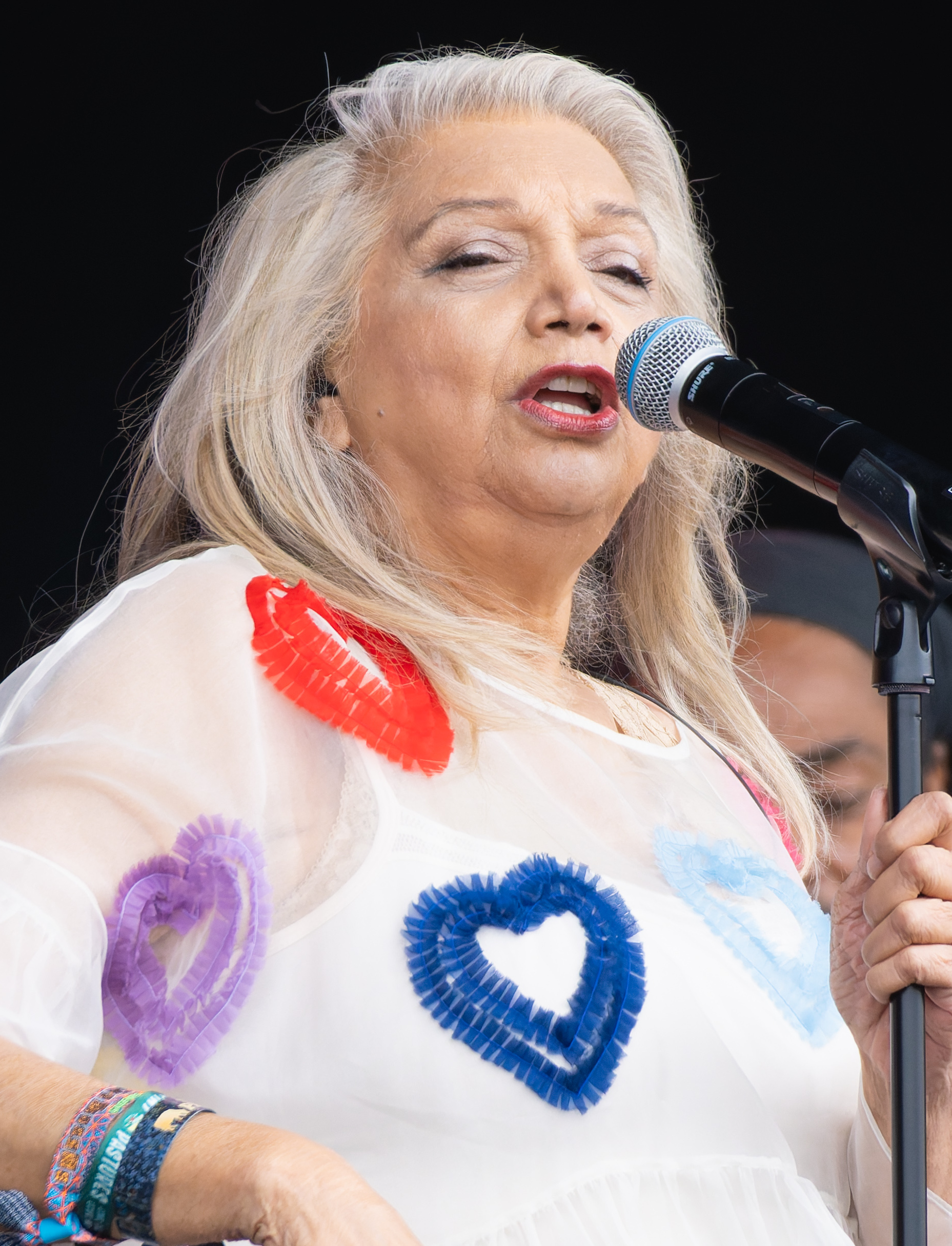
- Puthli in 2024

Background information
- Born: 1945 (age 80–81); Bombay, Bombay Presidency, British India (now Mumbai, Maharashtra, India)
- Genres: Jazz; pop; disco; electronica
- Occupation: Singer
- Years active: 1970–present
- Labels: CBS/Sony; PolyGram; TK; Autobahn; Top of the World
- Website: theashaputhli.com

Asha Puthli (born 1945) is an Indian-born American singer-songwriter, producer, and actress. She moved to New York from Mumbai with a dance scholarship, and in 1970, she was signed to CBS Records and subsequently released several solo albums. Her recordings cover blues, pop, rock, soul, funk, disco, and techno music. She also starred in films by Merchant Ivory and Bruno Corbucci. In 2025, Puthli was inducted into the Women Songwriters Hall of Fame.

== Early life and education ==
Ahsa Puthli was born in Mumbai (then Bombay) in 1945. Her father was a businessman, and her mother was a homemaker. They had fought in the Indian independence movement and owned Bombay Woollen Mills. Her aunt is Indian freedom fighter Kamaladevi Chattopadhyay.

Like many upper-middle-class Hindu children at the time, she attended English-speaking Catholic schools. Puthli began training at an early age in Indian classical music and opera. She listened to jazz and pop music on the radio, which led to her interest in fusion. At thirteen, she won a contest in which she sang "Malagueña". The victory encouraged her to begin improvising with a jazz band at local tea dances. Ved Mehta described her singing in his book Portrait of India. She went to a university in Mumbai.

== Career ==
Puthli appeared in her first film, shot by Indian director Mani Kaul, in 1968.

Puthli, who had studied Bharatanatyam and Odissi, was able to make her way backstage and secure an audition in New York for the Martha Graham School's modern jazz dance course when the American modern dancer Martha Graham's dance troupe visited India on tour. However, she lacked a passport and would have to audition in New York. Her friend who worked as a flight attendant for British Overseas Airways Corporation (BOAC) informed her one day that they were conducting interviews for potential future hiring. After meeting the general manager, Puthli received an immediate job offer. "I couldn’t get the scholarship unless I went to America to audition, and I couldn't get to America without a scholarship," she recalled. She accepted the job in order to obtain a passport and for her training, she spent two months in London, where she later recalled she "would get to hear real jazz".

After resigning and moving to New York in 1969, she succeeded in her dancing audition and was awarded a one-year scholarship at the Martha Graham School. Puthli portrayed Salome in a production of Jesus: A Passion Play for Americans, which was filmed by WGBH in Boston and televised nationally in March 1970.

As an ambassador of the Tea Council, Puthli toured the United States in 1970, inviting young artists to participate in a competition the council called a "search for the new sound."

In 1970, John H. Hammond at Columbia had read Ved Mehta's portrait of her in Jazz in Bombay. After hearing a rough demo, he signed her to CBS Records. Hammond sent her to audition for avant-garde jazz saxophonist Ornette Coleman, who was looking for a singer for his album Science Fiction (1972). For the album, Puthli sang on two songs, "What Reason Could I Give" and "All My Life". For her work on Science Fiction, she shared the DownBeat Critics' Poll award for Best Female Jazz Vocalist.

She also sang lead vocals on the Peter Ivers Blues Band's cover version of "Ain’t That Peculiar", which was reviewed favorably in Cashbox, Rolling Stone, and Billboard. The single, released in 1972, entered the Billboard charts. Take It Out On Me, the band's album featuring Puthli, was finally released in 2009.

Puthli became part of pop artist Andy Warhol's Factory scene. Warhol superstar Holly Woodlawn was her close friend and roommate, and together they starred in Bad Marion's Last Year (1971), directed by Gene Ayres.

She continued acting with a lead role in Merchant Ivory's Savages (1972), which was screened at the 1972 Cannes Film Festival and banned in her homeland. Her popularity grew in Europe, where she signed a record deal with CBS. Her music reflected her interest in pop, rock, soul, and funk. She gravitated toward the glam world of Elton John and T. Rex. Her debut Asha Puthli (1973) was produced by Del Newman, and it included cover versions of songs by JJ Cale and Bill Withers. She hired Pierre LaRoche (makeup designer for David Bowie and Freddie Mercury) and photographer Mick Rock to shoot the cover. The album included a disco version of "I Am a Song" by Neil Sedaka.

Her third solo album, The Devil is Loose (1976), was called an instant classic by The New York Times. Music critic Robert Palmer called her singing "extraordinary". Thom Jurek of AllMusic called it " a masterpiece of snakey, spaced-out soul and pre-mainstream disco."

Puthli interviewed Gayatri Devi, the Maharani of Jaipur, for Warhol's Interview magazine in 1977.

Her sense of fashion brought her visibility. She was a fixture at Studio 54 and dressed by designers Michaele Vollbracht and Manolo Blahnik and photographed by Richard Avedon and Francesco Scavullo.

By the end of the decade, she returned to acting and had a lead role in Bruno Corbucci's The Gang That Sold America (1979).

Puthli's music never quite found a place in the American mainstream, despite having sold well in Europe. In the 1980s, she went into semi-retirement. She sang on Hey Diwani, Hey Diwani by Dum Dum Project in 2001 and Asana Vol. 3 by Bill Laswell in 2003. In 2005, she returned to the UK charts with "Looking Glass" from the album Fear of Magnetism by Stratus.

In August 2006, Puthli headlined Central Park Summerstage in New York City on an eclectic bill with DJ Spooky, Talvin Singh, Outernational, and Prefuse 73, and special guests Dewey Redman and Dres (rapper) of the hip-hop group Black Sheep.

In 2020, she was a featured collaborator on Italian singer Gabriel Grillotti's single "Je Crois C'est Ça L'amour."

In 2021, British independent label Mr Bongo Records reissued her 1976 album The Devil is Loose, and followed it up with a 20-track anthology in 2022.

In 2024, she performed at Glastonbury Festival, aged 79. She also performed at the We Out Here music festival at St. Giles, England, in August 2024.

On July 23, 2025, Puthli once again headlined Central Park Summerstage in New York City. On March 7, 2026 she performed as a guest artist with Gorillaz (along with Anoushka Shankar and Black Thought) on Saturday Night Live.

On March 8, 2026, Asha Puthli and Say She She released the collaborative single "Pawa!".

=== Musical style ===
Praised as a "fusion pioneer" by The New York Times, Puthli's recordings cover blues, pop, rock, soul, funk, disco, and techno.

== Influence and recognition ==
Puthli's song "Space Talk" from the 1970s, a popular tune with David Mancuso's "The Loft" crowd, has been sampled by P.Diddy, The Notorious B.I.G., Dilated Peoples, Governor featuring 50 Cent, and Redman; and her cover of George Harrison's "I Dig Love" was sampled in 2005 for the chart-topping track "Reload It" by UK MOBO Award-winner Kano. She has co-writer credits with Jay-Z, P. Diddy, The Neptunes, Jermaine Dupri, SWV, and The Notorious B.I.G. on the track "The World is Filled" from the multi-platinum album Life After Death.

=== Accolades ===
In 2013, the Grammy Museum in downtown Los Angeles featured a display of Puthli's albums and wardrobe.

In 2025, Puthli was honored by the Women Songwriters Hall of Fame.

== Personal life ==
In 1970, as her U.S. student visa was about to expire, Puthli approached a man outside the Museum of Modern Art in New York and proposed marriage. The man, an abstract painter named George Stillwaggon, agreed, but he was a "self-confessed homosexual," and they did not consummate their marriage. She later married Marc Goldschmidt, and they had a son born in February 1975 before their divorce in 1981.

== Discography ==
=== Albums ===
- Asha Puthli (CBS, 1973)
- She Loves to Hear the Music (CBS, 1975)
- The Devil Is Loose (CBS, 1976)
- L'Indiana (CBS, 1978)
- 1001 Nights of Love (Autobahn/Philips, 1979)
- I'm Gonna Kill It Tonight (Autobahn, 1980)
- Only the Headaches Remain (Woorell, 1982)
- Hari Om (Sony, 1990)
- Lost (Kyrone, 2009)

==== As guest ====
- The Complete Science Fiction Sessions, Ornette Coleman (Columbia, 2000)
- Science Fiction, Ornette Coleman (Columbia, 1972)
- Mirror, Charlie Mariano (Atlantic, 1972)
- Squadra Antigangsters (Cinevox, 1979)
- Easily Slip Into Another World, Henry Threadgill (Novus, 1989)
- Export Quality, Dum Dum Project (Times Square/Groovy, 2001)
- Mpath - Wanderer, Gardner Cole (Triloka, 2003)
- Accerezzami, Fausto Papetti (2003)
- Asana Vol 3: Peaceful Heart, Bill Laswell (Meta, 2003)
- Fear of Magnetism, Stratus (Klein, 2005)
- Asana OHM Shanti, Bill Laswell (Meta, 2006)
- Asha's Kiss, Raveena (Asha's Awakening, 2022)
- The Mountain, Gorillaz (Parlophone, 2026)
