= Alone Too Long =

Alone Too Long may refer to:

- Alone Too Long (album), a 1977 Tommy Flanagan recording
- "Alone Too Long" (song), a Hall & Oates composition
- "Alone Too Long", a song from the 1962 Nelson Riddle album Love Is a Game of Poker
