= Steal Away (album) =

Studio album by Charlie Haden and Hank Jones
- Released: April 1995
- Recorded: June 29–30, 1994
- Genre: Jazz, gospel, spiritual
- Length: 65:19
- Label: Verve
- Producer: Charlie Haden

Charlie Haden chronology
The Montreal Tapes: with Paul Bley and Paul Motian (1994)	Steal Away (1995)	Now Is the Hour (1996)

Hank Jones chronology
The Music of Thad Jones (1993)	Steal Away (1995)	Ain't Misbehavin' (1999)

Steal Away is an album by pianist Hank Jones and bassist Charlie Haden, recorded in 1994 and released on the Verve label. Jones and Haden followed Steal Away with a second album of spirituals, Come Sunday, recorded in 2010 and released in 2012.

== Reception ==
The AllMusic review by Scott Yanow stated, "These melodic yet subtly swinging interpretations hold one's interest throughout and reward repeated listenings".

Professional ratings
Review scores
Source	Rating
AllMusic	4/5 stars
The Penguin Guide to Jazz Recordings	3/4 stars

== Track listing ==
All compositions traditional except as indicated

1. "It's Me, O Lord (Standin' in the Need of Prayer)" – 5:22
2. "Nobody Knows the Trouble I've Seen" – 3:44
3. "Spiritual" (Charlie Haden) – 4:20
4. "Wade in the Water" – 4:05
5. "Swing Low, Sweet Chariot" – 2:04
6. "Sometimes I Feel Like a Motherless Child" – 4:31
7. "L' Amour de Moy" – 4:55
8. "Danny Boy" (Frederic Weatherly) – 5:51
9. "I've Got a Robe, You Got a Robe (Goin' to Shout All over God's Heav'n)" – 3:49
10. "Steal Away" – 2:49
11. "We Shall Overcome" – 5:33
12. "Go Down Moses" – 6:04
13. "My Lord, What a Mornin'" – 4:35
14. "Hymn Medley: Abide With Me/Just as I Am Without One Plea/What a Friend We Have in Jesus/Amazing Grace" (Henry Francis Lyte, William Henry Monk/Charlotte Elliott, William Bachelder Bradbury/Joseph M. Scriven, Charles Crozat Converse/John Newton) – 7:37

- Recorded at Radio Canada Studio B in Montreal, Canada on June 29 & 30, 1994

== Personnel ==
- Hank Jones — piano
- Charlie Haden — bass
