= Montreal International Jazz Festival =

Annual music festival held in Montreal, Quebec, Canada

Festival international de Jazz de Montréal
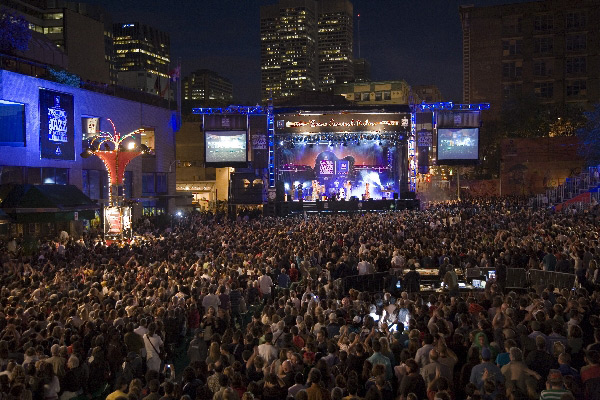
- Festival International de Jazz de Montréal at night
- Genre: Jazz
- Dates: June/July
- Locations: Montreal, Quebec, Canada
- Coordinates: 45°30′N 73°34′W
- Years active: 1980–present
- Founders: Alain Simard
- Attendance: 2,000,000 (2023, 10 days total)
- Capacity: 200,000 (all stages combined)
- Website: montrealjazzfest.com

The Festival international de Jazz de Montréal is an annual jazz festival held in Montreal, Quebec, Canada. The Montreal Jazz Fest holds the 2004 Guinness World Record as the world's largest jazz festival. Every year it features roughly 3,000 artists from 30-odd countries, more than 650 concerts (including 450 free outdoor performances), and welcomes over 2 million visitors (12.5% of whom are tourists) as well as 300 accredited journalists. The festival takes place at 20 different stages, which include free outdoor stages and indoor concert halls.

A major part of the city's downtown core is closed to traffic for ten days, as free outdoor shows are open to the public and held on many stages at the same time, from noon until midnight. The "festival's Big Event concerts typically draw between 100,000 and 150,000 people", and can occasionally exceed 200,000. Shows are held in a wide variety of venues, from relatively small jazz clubs to the large concert halls of Place des Arts. Some of the outdoor shows are held on the cordoned-off streets, while others are in terraced parks.

== History ==
Rouè-Doudou Boicel founded the Rising Sun Festijazz, Montreal's first blues & jazz festival in 1978. There were other previous jazz festivals in Montreal, including the three-day Jazz de Chez Nous festival in 1979, created by Montreal bassist Charlie Biddle.

The Montreal Jazz Festival (later: Montreal International Jazz Festival) was conceived by Alain Simard, who had spent much of the 1970s working with Productions Kosmos bringing artists such as Chuck Berry, Dave Brubeck, Chick Corea, Bo Diddley, John Lee Hooker, Muddy Waters, and others to Montreal to perform. In 1977, Simard teamed up with André Ménard and Denyse McCann to form an agency named Spectra Scène (now known as L'Équipe Spectra), with the idea of creating a summer festival in Montreal that would bring a number of artists together at the same time.

They planned their first festival for the summer of 1979. Unable to secure sufficient funding, their plans were scuttled, but they still were able to produce two nights of shows at Théâtre-St-Denis featuring Keith Jarrett and Pat Metheny.

Starting on May 10, 1980, a Montreal Jazz Festival was staged, with funding from Alain de Grosbois of CBC Stereo and Radio-Québec. With Gary Burton, Ray Charles, Chick Corea, and Vic Vogel on the bill, and an attendance of 12,000, the event was deemed a success and has continued to grow since then.

In 2000, the Festival teamed up with Distribution Select to release its 4-CD box set called Over 20 years of music – Plus de 20 ans de musique. The box includes a 13-page booklet with the artists' biographies and complete liner notes about the music.

In 1999, a group of Montreal jazz musicians disenchanted with the Montreal International Jazz Festival's lack of support for and showcasing of Montreal jazz musicians created an alternative festival called L'OFF Festival de Jazz de Montreal. The alternative festival continues as an annual, week-long jazz festival in Montreal, programmed largely by musicians.

In 2020, for the first time in its 40-year history, the International Montreal Jazz Festival was cancelled, due to the COVID-19 pandemic, in what would have been its 41st edition. In 2021, because of the on-going COVID-19 pandemic, the 41st edition was postponed until autumn, reduced to 5 days, and limited to outdoor performances, while indoor shows were held in 2022.

== Recordings ==
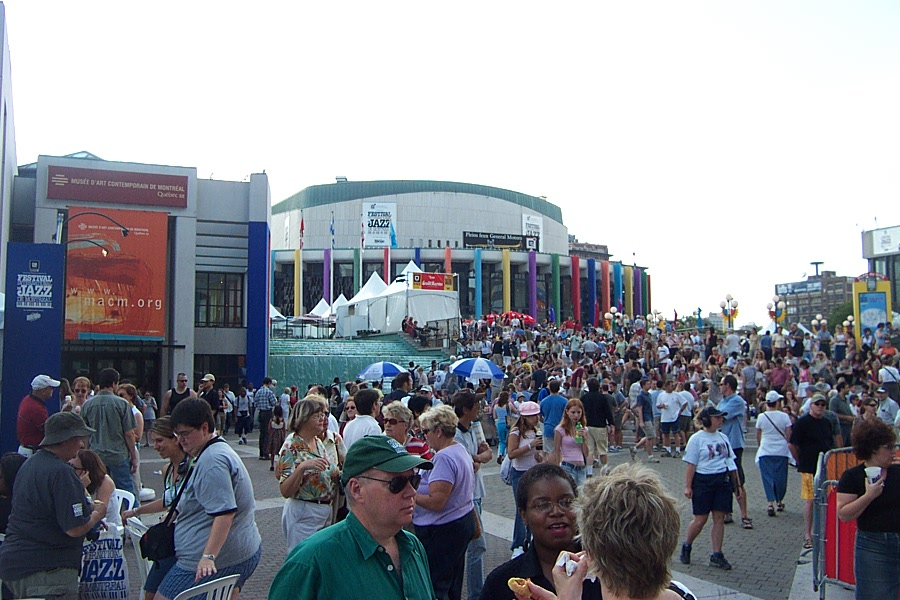
Festival International de Jazz de Montréal

A number of albums have been recorded live at the festival, including:

- Live at Montreal International Jazz Festival – New Air (1983)
- Decoy (album) - Miles Davis (1984) - tracks "What It Is" and "That's What Happened" recorded at festival
- Live at the Montreal Jazz Festival 1985 – Ahmad Jamal (1985)
- After the Morning – John Hicks (1992)
- Enrico Rava Quintet – Montréal Diary /A - Plays Miles Davis (2002)
- Enrico Rava, Stefano Bollani – Montréal Diary /B (2002)
- Live at the Montreal Jazz Festival – Diana Krall (2004)
- Midnight Sun – Cirque du Soleil (2004)
- Live from the Montreal International Jazz Festival – Ben Harper & Relentless7 (2010)

Charlie Haden, The Montreal Tapes – recorded in 1989

- The Montreal Tapes: with Don Cherry and Ed Blackwell (Verve, 1994)
- The Montreal Tapes: with Paul Bley and Paul Motian (Verve, 1994)
- The Montreal Tapes: with Geri Allen and Paul Motian (Verve, 1997)
- The Montreal Tapes: with Gonzalo Rubalcaba and Paul Motian (Verve, 1997)
- The Montreal Tapes: Liberation Music Orchestra (Verve, 1997)
- The Montreal Tapes: Tribute to Joe Henderson (Verve, 2003)

== Concours de Jazz ==
Established in 1982, the Concours de Jazz is an annual competition held at the Montreal International Jazz Festival. The competition takes place between Canadian groups performing original music, and is part of the festival's outdoor program. Throughout its history the prize has been awarded to many of Canada's most prominent jazz musicians.

Name changes

- 1982-1986 – Concours de Jazz
- 1987-1992 – Prix de Jazz Alcan
- 1993-1999 – Prix de Jazz du Maurier
- 2000-2009 – Grand Prix de Jazz General Motors
- 2012–present – TD Grand Jazz Award, sponsored by Toronto-Dominion Bank (TD Bank)

Winners

- 1982 – Michel Donato
- 1983 – Quartz
- 1984 – Lorraine Desmarais Trio
- 1985 – François Bourassa
- 1986 – Jon Ballantyne Trio
- 1987 – Hugh Fraser Quintet
- 1988 – Edmonton Jazz Ensemble
- 1989 – Fifth Avenue
- 1990 – Creatures of Habit
- 1991 – Steve Amirault Trio
- 1992 – James Gelfand Trio
- 1993 – Chelsea Bridge
- 1994 – Normand Guilbeault Ensemble
- 1995 – Jean-François Groulx Trio
- 1996 – Roy Patterson Quartet
- 1997 – Joel Miller Quintet
- 1998 – John Stetch Trio
- 1999 – Chris Mitchell Quintet
- 2000 – Eduardo Pipman Quartet
- 2001 – Nick Ali and Cruzao
- 2002 – Andrew Downing and The Great Uncles of the Revolution
- 2003 – Nancy Walker
- 2004 – Odd Jazz Group
- 2005 – Alex Bellegarde Quartette
- 2006 – David Virelles Quintet
- 2007 – Félix Stüssi and Give Me Five
- 2008 – Arden Arapyan
- 2009 – Amanda Tosoff Quartet
- 2010 – Parc X Trio
- 2011 – Alexandre Côté Quintet
- 2012 – Robi Botos
- 2013 – Hutchinson-Andrew Trio
- 2014 – Pram Trio
- 2015 – Rachel Therrien Quintet
- 2016 – Brad Cheeseman Group
- 2017 – Allison Au Quartet
