= Old and New Dreams (1979 album) =

Studio album by Old and New Dreams
- Released: 1979
- Recorded: August 1979
- Studio: Talent Studio; Oslo, Norway
- Genre: Jazz
- Length: 46:37
- Label: ECM 1154
- Producer: Manfred Eicher

Old and New Dreams chronology
Old and New Dreams (1977)	Old and New Dreams (1979)	Playing (1981)

Old and New Dreams is the self-titled second album by jazz quartet Old and New Dreams, recorded in 1979 and released on ECM later that year. The quartet features trumpeter Don Cherry, saxophonist Dewey Redman, and rhythm section of Charlie Haden and Ed Blackwell—their debut, released on Black Saint, was also self titled.

== Reception ==
The AllMusic review by Scott Yanow called the album "stirring music in a setting that always brought out the best in each of these musicians."

Between Sound and Space's Tyran Grillo called the album a "delightful excursion into post-bop outlands that sounds as alive as ever", and wrote: "This is a superb album, and regardless of whether these dreams are old or new, they never seem to fade. What makes it so strong is its careful balance of sidewinding monologues and the sense of direction that a full band sound brings. One craves that sound throughout and the expectation it manifests, so that when it comes in such thick doses, it heightens our involvement in the listening. It acknowledges us."

Professional ratings
Review scores
Source	Rating
AllMusic	4.5/5 stars
The Penguin Guide to Jazz Recordings	3.5/4 stars
The Rolling Stone Jazz Record Guide	3/5 stars

== Track listing ==
1. "Lonely Woman" (Ornette Coleman) - 12:23
2. "Togo" (Ed Blackwell) - 5:41
3. "Guinea" (Don Cherry) - 5:34
4. "Open or Close" (Coleman) - 8:12
5. "Orbit of La-Ba" (Dewey Redman) - 7:29
6. "Song for the Whales" (Charlie Haden) - 7:45

== Personnel ==
=== Old and New Dreams ===
- Don Cherry – pocket trumpet
- Dewey Redman – tenor saxophone, musette
- Charlie Haden – bass
- Ed Blackwell – drums
