= The Struggle Continues (Dewey Redman album) =

Studio album by the Dewey Redman Quartet
- Released: 1982
- Recorded: January 1982
- Genre: Jazz
- Length: 44:47
- Label: ECM; ECM 1225
- Producer: Robert Hurwitz

Dewey Redman chronology
Red and Black in Willisau (1980)	The Struggle Continues (1982)	Living on the Edge (1989)

The Struggle Continues is an album by the Dewey Redman Quartet recorded in January 1982 and released on ECM later that year. The quartet features rhythm section Charles Eubanks, Mark Helias, and Ed Blackwell.

== Reception ==
Professional ratings
Review scores
Source	Rating
AllMusic	4.5/5 stars
The Penguin Guide to Jazz Recordings	3/4 stars
The Rolling Stone Jazz Record Guide	4/5 stars

The AllMusic review by Thom Jurek stated: "This is one of Dewey Redman's strongest but least celebrated dates... Inspired and inspiring, The Struggle Continues is one of the gems of the ECM catalog in the '80s and a shining star in jazz, period."

== Track listing ==
All tracks are written by Dewey Redman, except as noted.

Side I
No.	Title	Length
1.	"Thren"	7:53
2.	"Love Is"	10:27
3.	"Turn Over Baby"	4:34

Side II
No.	Title	Writer(s)	Length
1.	"Joie de vivre"		8:29
2.	"Combinations"		5:23
3.	"Dewey Square"	Charlie Parker	8:01

== Personnel ==
=== Dewey Redman Quartet ===
- Dewey Redman – tenor saxophone
- Charles Eubanks – piano
- Mark Helias – bass
- Ed Blackwell – drums
