= Galaxy Records =

- Parent company: Fantasy Records
- Founded: 1964
- Founder: Max Weiss; Sol Weiss
- Status: Defunct
- Genre: Jazz
- Country of origin: U.S.
- Location: Berkeley, California

Galaxy Records was a record label founded in 1964 by Max and Sol Weiss in Berkeley, California. It was a division of Fantasy Records.

== History ==
Galaxy Records was officially launched in 1964 in Berkeley, California. In 1967 Galaxy and Fantasy were sold. After ten years of inactivity, Galaxy released albums by Art Pepper, Chet Baker, Stanley Cowell, Nat Adderley, Tommy Flanagan, Red Garland, Johnny Griffin, Roy Haynes, Hank Jones, Philly Joe Jones, Shelly Manne, and Ira Sullivan. Galaxy Records was closed down for good around 1990's due to conflict problems.

== Discography ==
Galaxy Records first album series, the G-200/8200 series consisted of nine, primarily R&B, albums released between 1963 and 1968. In 1977 Galaxy started the GXY-5100 series, which was a jazz series that ran to 1985.

Catalog No.	Album	Artist	Details
201/8201	John Lee Hooker	John Lee Hooker	
202/8202	16 of the Best of B.B. King	B.B. King	
203/8203	Little Johnny Taylor	Little Johnny Taylor	
204/8204	In the Beginning	Sonny Stitt and Milt Jackson	
205/8205	Live at Sugar Hill	John Lee Hooker	
206/8206	The Mellow, Mellow Leon Haywood	Leon Haywood	
207/8207	Soul Full of Blues: Little Johnny Taylor's Greatest Hits	Little Johnny Taylor	
208/8208	B.B. King's 16 Greatest Hits	B.B. King	Reissue of Galaxy 202/8202
209/8209	Soul Grooving	Merl Saunders with Trio and Big Band	
5101	Essence	Shelly Manne	
5102	Fancy Free	Richard Davis	
5103	Thank You Thank You	Roy Haynes	
5104	Waiting for the Moment	Stanley Cowell	
5105	Just for Fun	Hank Jones	
5106	Crossings	Red Garland	
5107	Breathe Easy	Cal Tjader	
5108	Tiptoe Tapdance	Hank Jones	
5109	Red Alert	Red Garland	
5110	Something Borrowed, Something Blue	Tommy Flanagan	
5111	Talkin' 'bout Love	Stanley Cowell	
5112	Philly Mignon	Philly Joe Jones	
5113	Our Delights	Tommy Flanagan and Hank Jones	
5114	Peace	Ira Sullivan	
5115	Equinox	Red Garland	
5116	Vistalite	Roy Haynes	
5117	Return of the Griffin	Johnny Griffin	
5118	Musics	Dewey Redman	
5119	Art Pepper Today	Art Pepper	
5120	A Little New York Midtown Music	Nat Adderley	
5121	Here	Cal Tjader	
5122	Advance!	Philly Joe Jones	
5123	Ain't Misbehavin'	Hank Jones	
5124	French Concert	Shelley Manne	
5125	Equipoise	Stanley Cowell	
5126	Bush Dance	Johnny Griffin	
5127	Straight Life	Art Pepper	
5128	Landscape	Art Pepper	
5129	Stepping Out	Red Garland	
5130	Soundsigns	Dewey Redman	
5131	New World	Stanley Cowell	
5132	NYC Underground	Johnny Griffin	
5133	Ballads by Four	Art Pepper / John Klemmer / Johnny Griffin / Joe Henderson	
5134	Five Birds and a Monk	Johnny Griffin	
5135	Strike Up the Band	Red Garland	
5137	Multimedia	Ira Sullivan	
5139	To the Ladies	Johnny Griffin	
5140	Winter Moon	Art Pepper	
5141	One September Afternoon	Art Pepper	
5142	Roadgame	Art Pepper	
5143	Goin' Home	Art Pepper and George Cables	
5144	Carnaval	Ron Carter, Hank Jones, Sadao Watanabe and Tony Williams	
5145	Art Lives	Art Pepper	
5146	Call It Whachawana	Johnny Griffin	
5147	Tête-à-Tête	Art Pepper and George Cables	
5148	Artworks	Art Pepper	
5149	So Long Blues	Red Garland	
5150	Once Upon a Summertime	Chet Baker	
5151	APQ	Art Pepper	
5152	More Delights	Tommy Flanagan and Hank Jones	
5153	Drum Song	Philly Joe Jones	
5154	New York Album	Art Pepper	
