= To the Ladies (album) =

Studio album by Johnny Griffin
- Released: 1982
- Recorded: November 27–28, 1979
- Studio: Fantasy Studios, Berkeley CA
- Genre: Jazz
- Label: Galaxy; GXY-5139
- Producer: Johnny Griffin, Orrin Keepnews

Johnny Griffin chronology
NYC Underground (1979)	To the Ladies (1982)	Meeting (1981)

To the Ladies is an album by saxophonist Johnny Griffin which was recorded in 1979 and released on the Galaxy label.

== Reception ==
Professional ratings
Review scores
Source	Rating
AllMusic	3/5 stars

The AllMusic review by Scott Yanow stated: "tenor saxophonist Johnny Griffin sticks exclusively to group originals on this interesting but not essential LP. Griffin is in excellent form, as usual, but none of the tunes caught on".

== Track listing ==
All compositions by Johnny Griffin, except where indicated.

1. "Miriam" – 4:45
2. "Susanita" (Ray Drummond) – 7:46
3. "Jean Marie" (Ronnie Mathews) – 8:07
4. "Soft and Furry, Part 1" – 6:51
5. "Soft and Furry, Part 2" – 4:54
6. "Soft and Furry, Part 3" – 3:57
7. "Honey Bucket" – 7:00

== Personnel ==
- Johnny Griffin – tenor saxophone
- Ronnie Mathews – piano
- Ray Drummond – bass
- Idris Muhammad – drums
