= Soundsigns =

Studio album by Dewey Redman
- Released: 1979
- Recorded: October 18 & 19, 1978
- Genre: Jazz
- Length: 40:29
- Label: Galaxy

Dewey Redman chronology
Musics (1978)	Soundsigns (1979)	Red and Black in Willisau (1980)

Soundsigns is an album by the American jazz saxophonist Dewey Redman. It was recorded in 1978 for the Galaxy label.

== Reception ==
The AllMusic review by Scott Yanow stated: "Recorded at the same sessions that resulted in Musics, this LP (which has not yet been reissued on CD) is actually more exploratory".

Professional ratings
Review scores
Source	Rating
AllMusic	3/5 stars
The Rolling Stone Jazz Record Guide	3/5 stars

== Track listing ==
All compositions by Redman except as indicated

1. "Piece for Tenor and Two Basses" - 8:23
2. "Half Nelson" (Miles Davis) - 10:07
3. "Adesso Lo Sai" - 13:59
4. "Come Earth" - 8:00

- Recorded at Fantasy Studios in Berkeley, California, on October 18 & 19, 1978

== Personnel ==
- Dewey Redman - tenor saxophone (tracks 1–3), harp (track 4)
- Fred Simmons - piano (tracks 2 & 3)
- Charlie Haden (tracks 1 & 4), Mark Helias - bass
- Eddie Moore - drums, saw, cymbal (tracks 2–4)
