= The Complete Science Fiction Sessions =

Compilation album by Ornette Coleman
- Released: 2000
- Recorded: September and October 1971; September 1972
- Studios: Columbia Studios, New York City
- Genre: Free jazz
- Length: 1:48:54
- Labels: Columbia; C2K 63569
- Producer: James Jordan

The Complete Science Fiction Sessions is a two-CD compilation album by Ornette Coleman. Released by Columbia Records in 2000, it brings together tracks recorded during September and October 1971 and September 1972 sessions at Columbia Studios in New York City. The album includes all of the music that was originally issued on Science Fiction (Columbia, 1972) and Broken Shadows (Columbia, 1982), along with previously unreleased material. On the album, Coleman is joined by a core group of long-time associates consisting of trumpeters Don Cherry and Bobby Bradford, saxophonist Dewey Redman, double bassist Charlie Haden, and drummers Billy Higgins and Ed Blackwell. Guest artists include guitarist Jim Hall, pianist Cedar Walton, trumpeters Carmine Fornarotto and Gerard Schwarz, and vocalists David Henderson, Asha Puthli, and Webster Armstrong.

== Reception ==
Professional ratings
Review scores
Source	Rating
AllMusic	4.5/5 stars
The Baltimore Sun	4/5 stars
The Penguin Guide to Jazz	3/4 stars
The New Rolling Stone Album Guide	4/5 stars
Tom Hull – on the Web	A−

In a review for AllMusic, Thom Jurek called the album "a stellar collection of Ornette-ology assembled in one place," and wrote: "This is some of his very best material, archived and issued the way it should have been in the first place."

The authors of The Penguin Guide to Jazz Recordings stated: "this is a muddled and patchy set, likely to be of interest only to established Coleman fans who can hear past the sheer oddity of Jim Hall's role and who're able to identify anticipations of future innovations."

David Adler of All About Jazz commented: "The expanded ensemble, the busy rhythms percolating underneath sustained chords and melodic figures, the dream-like vocals by Asha Puthli: all of it brims with the kind of tradition/anti-tradition dialectic found in much of today's best new music... These sessions may not rank among the best of Coleman's works, but they offer an important glimpse into the evolution of one of modern jazz's prophets."

A reviewer for PopMatters noted the way in which "voices become part of the mix, bringing language into the music, complicating the unrepresentability of music and the madness of Coleman’s composition," and remarked: "The Complete Science Fiction Sessions pastes two Coleman albums together, as they should have been, and returns to these sessions their rightful continuity."

The Washington Post's Steve Futterman stated that the leader's bandmates "grab onto Coleman's open-ended forms like delighted kids on a scary roller coaster," and wrote: "Obviously inspired himself, Coleman had provided them with some first-rate material... The leader's own alto sax solos are things of joy: His prancing improvisations practically shout out their enthusiasm but never forfeit any formal solidity or control of striking tonal effects."

In an article for The Baltimore Sun, J. D. Considine praised the "otherworldly beauty" of Coleman's melodies, which were "closer to art song than to anything in the hit parade." He commented: "By placing such strong emphasis on melody, Coleman put the lie to the notion that his 'free jazz' was pure chaos... the overall thrust of the album emphasized musical structure."

Bill Milkowski of JazzTimes noted that the album "presents an astonishing variety" of instrumental and vocal combinations, and remarked: "Haden's playing is particularly strong, providing a tether for the mercurial Coleman-Cherry chemistry. And Higgins is Higgins-an ever-swinging, pulsating presence, reacting in the moment with big ears and supple wrists."

Spin's Suzanne McElfresh stated: "Coleman's fervent, blues-infused alto blends with the dense expressionism of the ensemble, floating on the bounce of the drummers and Haden's radiant bass intuitions while setting the mark for the horns' soulful, fiery cry."

A writer for The Wire wrote: "like the contemporaneous music of Miles Davis and Herbie Hancock, nothing on Science Fiction sounds compatible with rock's aims, attitudes or intentions, let alone its rhythmic sensibilities. The beat, though louder and more intrusive, remains an integral part of the total structure, rather than part of a rhythm track on which everything else runs."

== Track listing ==
All compositions by Ornette Coleman.

CD 1

1. "What Reason Could I Give" – 3:07
2. "Civilization Day" – 6:06
3. "Street Woman" – 4:51
4. "Science Fiction" – 5:03
5. "Rock the Clock" – 3:17
6. "All My Life" – 3:57
7. "Law Years" – 5:23
8. "The Jungle is a Skyscraper" – 5:28
9. "School Work" – 5:36
10. "Country Town Blues" – 6:25
11. "Street Woman (Alternate Take)" – 5:47 (previously unreleased)
12. "Civilization Day (Alternate Mix)" – 6:05 (previously unreleased)

CD2

1. "Happy House" – 9:48
2. "Elizabeth" – 10:26
3. "Written Word" – 9:44 (previously unreleased)
4. "Broken Shadows" – 6:42
5. "Rubber Gloves" – 3:24
6. "Good Girl Blues" – 3:05
7. "Is It Forever" – 4:49
- Recorded at Columbia Studios in New York City. Disc 1, tracks 2, 3, 7–12, and disc 2, tracks 1–4 recorded on September 9, 1971. Disc 1, track 4 recorded on September 10, 1971. Disc 1, tracks 1, 5, and 6 recorded on October 13, 1971. Disc 2, track 5 recorded on September 7, 1972. Disc 2, tracks 6–7 recorded on September 8, 1972.

== Personnel ==
- Ornette Coleman – alto saxophone, trumpet, violin
- Don Cherry – pocket trumpet (disc 1, tracks 2–4, 10–12; disc 2, tracks 1–4)
- Bobby Bradford – trumpet (disc 1, tracks 4, 7–9; disc 2, tracks 1–4)
- Carmine Fornarotto – trumpet (disc 1, tracks 1 and 6)
- Gerard Schwarz – trumpet (disc 1, tracks 1 and 6)
- Dewey Redman – tenor saxophone, musette (disc 1, tracks 1 and 4–9; disc 2, tracks 1–7)
- Charlie Haden – double bass
- Billy Higgins – drums (disc 1, tracks 1–4, 6, 10–12; disc 2, tracks 1–4)
- Ed Blackwell – drums (disc 1, tracks 1 and 4–9; disc 2, tracks 1–7)
- David Henderson – recitation (disc 1, track 4)
- Asha Puthli – vocals (disc 1, tracks 1 and 6)
- Jim Hall – guitar (disc 2, tracks 6–7)
- Cedar Walton – piano (disc 2, tracks 6–7)
- Webster Armstrong – vocals (disc 2, tracks 6–7)
- Uncredited woodwinds (disc 2, tracks 6–7)
