= Playing (album) =

Live album by Old and New Dreams
- Released: 1981
- Recorded: June 1980
- Venues: The Cornmarket Theater; Bregenz, Austria
- Genre: Jazz
- Length: 54:52
- Labels: ECM; ECM 1205
- Producer: Manfred Eicher

Old and New Dreams chronology
Old and New Dreams (1979)	Playing (1981)	A Tribute to Blackwell (1990)

Playing is a live album by American jazz quartet Old and New Dreams recorded at the Cornmarket Theater in Austria and released on ECM the following year. The quartet consists brass section Don Cherry and Dewey Redman and rhythm section Charlie Haden and Ed Blackwell.

== Reception ==
Regarding the album's opener, JazzTimes' critic Ethan Iverson commented: "You could almost call this outstanding performance a jam session. The harmonic matrix between Redman and Haden is thrilling; they’re making up changes and patterns together. Cherry is also in prime form. During each horn solo, Blackwell and Haden go into halftime. In response, Redman gives us pure diatonic melody, while Cherry deals out the blues. The bass solo is fabulous; the collective improvisation after is joyous; Blackwell gets a proper say as well. If I had to choose one Old and New Dreams track, I'd select 'Happy House.'"

AllMusic awarded the album 3 stars with reviewer Scott Yanow calling it "Recommended, as are Old and New Dreams' other three releases."

Writing for ECM blog Between Space and Time, Reviewer Tyran Grillo called the album a "fantastic set" that is "the place to start for anyone wanting a glimpse into the attic of Old And New Dreams." He wrote: "Considering the heft of talents assembled here, the results are weightlessly executed. This shows not weakness or lack of fortitude, but the maturity everyone brings to the sonic table. This is a solid date from musicians who know the business inside and out, and then some. About as good as it gets."

Professional ratings
Review scores
Source	Rating
AllMusic	3/5 stars
The Rolling Stone Jazz Record Guide	5/5 stars
The Penguin Guide to Jazz Recordings	3/4 stars

== Track listing ==
1. "Happy House" (Ornette Coleman) - 11:07
2. "Mopti" (Don Cherry) - 7:56
3. "New Dream" (Coleman) - 9:04
4. "Rushour" (Dewey Redman) - 7:01
5. "Broken Shadows" (Coleman) - 9:58
6. "Playing" (Charlie Haden) - 9:46

== Personnel ==
=== Old and New Dreams ===
- Don Cherry – pocket trumpet, piano
- Dewey Redman – tenor saxophone, musette
- Charlie Haden – bass
- Ed Blackwell – drums
