= So Long Blues =

Studio album by Red Garland
- Released: 1984
- Recorded: July 9–12, 1979
- Studio: Fantasy Studios, Berkeley, CA
- Genre: Jazz
- Label: Galaxy; GXY-5149
- Producer: Ed Michel

Red Garland chronology
Stepping Out (1979)	So Long Blues (1984)	Strike Up the Band (1979)

So Long Blues is an album by pianist Red Garland which was recorded in 1979 and released on the Galaxy label in 1984.

== Reception ==
Professional ratings
Review scores
Source	Rating
AllMusic	4/5 stars

The AllMusic review by Scott Yanow stated "Not released until 1984, this LP has "new" material from two Red Garland Galaxy sessions ... The biggest surprise is the pianist's vocal on "The Best Man." Otherwise, no real surprises occur, but everyone plays well within the hard bop mainstream".

== Track listing ==
1. "Gee, Baby, Ain't I Good to You" (Andy Razaf, Don Redman) – 9:14
2. "In a Mellotone" (Duke Ellington) – 6:56
3. "The Best Man" (Fred Wise, Roy Alfred) – 3:48
4. "So Long Blues" (Red Garland) – 9:13
5. "They Didn't Believe Me" (Jerome Kern, Herbert Reynolds) – 5:49
6. "3-String Blues" (Carter) – 5:27

== Personnel ==
- Red Garland – piano
- Kenny Burrell – guitar (tracks 1 & 3)
- Julian Priester – trombone (track 4)
- George Coleman – tenor saxophone (track 4)
- Ron Carter – bass
- Ben Riley – drums (tracks 1, 2 & 4–6)
