= NYC Underground =

Live album by Johnny Griffin
- Released: 1981
- Recorded: July 6–7, 1979
- Venue: Village Vanguard, NYC
- Genre: Jazz
- Label: Galaxy; GXY-5132
- Producer: Johnny Griffin, Orrin Keepnews

Johnny Griffin chronology
Bush Dance (1978)	NYC Underground (1981)	To the Ladies (1978)

NYC Underground is a live album by saxophonist Johnny Griffin which was recorded at the Village Vanguard in 1979 and released on the Galaxy label in 1981.

== Reception ==
Professional ratings
Review scores
Source	Rating
AllMusic	4/5 stars

The AllMusic review by Scott Yanow stated: "This Johnny Griffin quartet session, recorded live at the Village Vanguard, finds the distinctive tenor in generally exciting form".

== Track listing ==
All compositions by Johnny Griffin, except where indicated.

1. "Yours Is My Heart Alone" (Franz Lehár) – 7:33
2. A Few Words from Johnny Griffin... – 0:35
3. "Alone Again" – 11:32
4. "Let Me Touch It" – 9:08
5. "Sophisticated Lady" (Duke Ellington, Mitchell Parish, Irving Mills) – 6:20
6. "Rhythm-a-Ning" (Thelonious Monk) – 4:11

== Personnel ==
- Johnny Griffin – tenor saxophone
- Ronnie Mathews – piano
- Ray Drummond – bass
- Idris Muhammad – drums
