= Night and the City (album) =

Live album by Charlie Haden and Kenny Barron
- Released: March 1998
- Recorded: September 20–22, 1996
- Venue: The Iridium, NYC
- Genre: Jazz
- Length: 70:45
- Label: Verve
- Producer: Charlie Haden and Ruth Cameron

Charlie Haden chronology
The Montreal Tapes: with Gonzalo Rubalcaba and Paul Motian (1997)	Night and the City (1998)	None but the Lonely Heart (1998)

Kenny Barron chronology
Live at Bradley's II (1996)	Night and the City (1998)	Spirit Song (1999)

Night and the City is a live album by the bassist Charlie Haden and the pianist Kenny Barron, recorded at the Iridium Jazz Club in 1996 and released by Verve Records in 1998.

== Reception ==
The AllMusic review by Richard S. Ginell called the album "a thoughtful, intensely musical, sometimes haunting set of performances".

Professional ratings
Review scores
Source	Rating
AllMusic	3/5 stars
The Penguin Guide to Jazz Recordings	3.5/4 stars

== Track listing ==
1. "Twilight Song" (Kenny Barron) - 12:47
2. "For Heaven's Sake" (Elise Bretton, Sherman Edwards, Donald Meyer) - 10:46
3. "Spring Is Here" (Lorenz Hart, Richard Rodgers) - 10:20
4. "Body and Soul" (Frank Eyton, Johnny Green, Edward Heyman, Robert Sour) - 10:25
5. "You Don't Know What Love Is" (Gene de Paul, Don Raye) - 6:59
6. "Waltz for Ruth" (Charlie Haden) - 8:27
7. "The Very Thought of You" (Ray Noble) - 11:01

- Recorded at the Iridium in New York City on September 20, 21 & 22, 1996

== Personnel ==
- Kenny Barron — piano
- Charlie Haden — bass
