= A Tribute to Blackwell =

Live album by Old and New Dreams
- Released: 1990
- Recorded: November 7, 1987
- Venue: Atlanta, Georgia
- Genre: Jazz
- Length: 47:20
- Label: Black Saint
- Producer: Giovanni Bonandrini

Old and New Dreams chronology
Playing (1981)	A Tribute to Blackwell (1990)

A Tribute to Blackwell is a live album by jazz quartet Old and New Dreams. Recorded in 1987, it features trumpeter Don Cherry, saxophonist Dewey Redman, bassist Charlie Haden and drummer Ed Blackwell. It was released on the Italian Black Saint label.

== Reception ==
Allmusic awarded the album 4 stars with reviewer Scott Yanow stating, "All of the musicians are in top form on this no-changes music, creating fresh and intuitive melodies with both freedom and hints of the tradition". Don Snowden of the LA Times wrote: "Don Cherry's fractured trumpet lines and Dewey Redman's stately tenor are relatively muted and rarely interact on this mixture of originals and Coleman compositions aside from stating the melodic themes. That leaves the playing field open to Haden's springy pulse and Blackwell, whose propulsive style downplays cymbal swing in favor of polyrhythmic drum chops that constantly push and prod his bandmates. More solid than scintillating, but Haden and Blackwell make it satisfying."

Professional ratings
Review scores
Source	Rating
AllMusic	4/5 stars
The Penguin Guide to Jazz Recordings	3/4 stars
The Rolling Stone Jazz & Blues Album Guide	4/5 stars

== Track listing ==
1. "Happy House" (Ornette Coleman) – 9:15
2. "Law Years" (Coleman) – 9:00
3. "Togo" (Ed Blackwell) – 8:10
4. "Dewey's Tune" (Dewey Redman) – 11:25
5. "Street Woman" (Coleman) – 9:30
- Recorded at the Ed Blackwell Festival in Atlanta, Georgia on November 7, 1987

== Personnel ==
- Don Cherry – pocket trumpet
- Dewey Redman – tenor saxophone
- Charlie Haden – bass
- Ed Blackwell – drums
