= Old and New Dreams (1977 album) =

Studio album by Old and New Dreams
- Released: 1977
- Recorded: October 1976
- Genre: Jazz
- Length: 43:31
- Label: Black Saint
- Producer: Giovanni Bonandrini

Old and New Dreams chronology
Old and New Dreams (1977)	Old and New Dreams (1979)

Old and New Dreams is the debut album by the jazz quartet Old and New Dreams. The record features trumpeter Don Cherry, saxophonist Dewey Redman, bassist Charlie Haden and drummer Ed Blackwell and was recorded in 1976 for the Italian Black Saint label. It is not to be confused with their 1979 album of the same name for ECM.

== Reception ==
Professional ratings
Review scores
Source	Rating
Allmusic	4.5/5 stars
The Rolling Stone Jazz Record Guide	5/5 stars
DownBeat	4/5 stars

Michael G. Nastos, writing for allmusic, awarded the album 4½ stars, calling the quartet simply "A great group". In the All Music Guide to Jazz, Nastos described the album as "fully realized. Quintessential. Modern jazz supreme…."

Writing for SF Jazz, Rusty Aceves declared: "With its tight ensemble playing and approach that balanced free blowing with a pervading Asia-influenced exoticism, the album was a triumphant success." Regarding the album's opener, Ethan Iverson commented: "When the blowing starts, it's burning up-tempo swing. Blackwell's references include Max Roach and New Orleans parade drumming; Haden is informed by hillbilly music, J.S. Bach, and Wilbur Ware. Cherry plays heraldic lines that are clearly in a key alongside expanses of fast flurries that defy harmonic description. Redman plays more in tempo, either Sonny Rollins-style motivic development or pure abstraction. Both soloists like to quote the melody. In this open context, the horn players are free to play collectively and the bass and drums can abruptly change mood." He concluded: "1977 may not be considered a year stocked with jazz masterpieces, but this LP certainly qualifies."

DownBeat assigned the album 5 stars. Reviewer Arthur Moorhead wrote, "Within the context of "free jazz." it's refreshing to hear three tunes on a side, as opposed to lengthy discourses on one mode or pedal point".

== Track listing ==
1. "Handwoven" (Ornette Coleman) - 6:53
2. "Dewey's Tune" (Dewey Redman) - 5:52
3. "Chairman Mao" (Charlie Haden) - 7:33
4. "Next to the Quiet Stream" (Don Cherry) - 6:42
5. "Augmented" (Cherry) - 10:05
6. "Old and New Dreams" (Redman) - 6:26

Recorded at Generation Sound Studios in New York City in October 1976.

== Personnel ==
- Don Cherry - pocket trumpet
- Dewey Redman - tenor saxophone, musette
- Charlie Haden - bass
- Ed Blackwell - drums
