= Feelin' Red =

Studio album by Red Garland
- Released: 1979
- Recorded: May 15, 1978
- Studio: CI Recording Studios, New York City
- Genre: Jazz
- Label: Muse; MR 5130
- Producer: Mitch Farber

Red Garland chronology
Crossings (1977)	Feelin' Red (1979)	I Left My Heart... (1978)

Feelin' Red is an album by pianist Red Garland which was recorded in 1978 and released on the Muse label in 1979.

== Reception ==
Professional ratings
Review scores
Source	Rating
AllMusic	4/5 stars

The AllMusic review by stated "Garland was a professional boxer, and his pugilistic sensibilities are audible in the rough-and-tumble way he approaches the keyboard. ... Captured in flight with his late-'70s working trio of Sam Jones and Al Foster, Garland lays down a bevy of authoritative runs over a propulsive rhythm section. Solid but searching and undeniably soulful, Feelin' Red is Garland in top form".

== Track listing ==
1. "It's All Right With Me" (Cole Porter) – 8:40
2. "You Better Go Now" (Robert Graham, Bickley Reichner) – 4:23
3. "On a Clear Day" (Burton Lane, Alan Jay Lerner) – 8:30
4. "Going Home" (Traditional) – 8:01
5. "The Second Time Around" (Jimmy Van Heusen, Sammy Cahn) – 3:13
6. "I Wish I Knew" (Harry Warren, Mack Gordon) – 3:55
7. "Cherokee" (Ray Noble) – 5:32

== Personnel ==
- Red Garland – piano
- Sam Jones – bass
- Al Foster – drums
