= The Ear of the Behearer =

Studio album by Dewey Redman
- Released: 1973
- Recorded: June 8 & 9, 1973; September 9 & 10, 1974 (Bonus tracks)
- Genre: Jazz
- Length: 64:29
- Label: Impulse!

Dewey Redman chronology
Tarik (1969)	The Ear of the Behearer (1973)	Coincide (1974)

The Ear of the Behearer is an album by American jazz saxophonist Dewey Redman featuring performances recorded in 1973 for the Impulse! label. The CD reissue added four performances from Coincide (1974) as bonus tracks.

== Reception ==
The Allmusic review by Scott Yanow awarded the album 4 stars stating "Some of the music is quite adventurous and free, while other tracks include some freebop, a struttin' blues, and quieter ballads... Intriguing music".

Professional ratings
Review scores
Source	Rating
Allmusic	4/5 stars
Creem	C+
The Rolling Stone Jazz Record Guide	4/5 stars

== Track listing ==
All compositions by Dewey Redman

1. "Interconnection" - 4:53
2. "Imani" - 7:07
3. "Walls-Bridges" - 4:06
4. "PS" - 5:36
5. "Boody" - 12:05
6. "Sunlanding" - 2:25
7. "Image (In Disguise)" - 6:32
8. "Seeds and Deeds" - 4:50 Bonus track on CD reissue
9. "Joie de Vivre" - 3:19 Bonus track on CD reissue
10. "Funcitydues" - 3:19 Bonus track on CD reissue
11. "Qow" - 10:17 Bonus track on CD reissue

- Recorded at Generation Sound Studios in New York City on June 8 & 9, 1973 (tracks 1–7) and September 9 & 10, 1974 (tracks 8–11)

== Personnel ==
- Dewey Redman - tenor saxophone, alto saxophone, musette
- Ted Daniel - trumpet, Moroccan bugle
- Leroy Jenkins - violin (tracks 8–11)
- Jane Robertson - cello (tracks 1–7)
- Sirone - bass, wood flute
- Eddie Moore - drums, saw, timpani, cymbal, gong, struck idiophone
- Danny Johnson - percussion (tracks 1–7)
