= Tête-à-Tête (Art Pepper and George Cables album) =

Studio album by Art Pepper
- Released: 1983
- Recorded: April 13–14 and May 11, 1982
- Studio: Fantasy, Berkeley, CA
- Genre: Jazz
- Length: 39:17
- Label: Galaxy; GXY 5147
- Producer: Ed Michel, Laurie Pepper

Art Pepper chronology
Darn That Dream (1982)	Tête-à-Tête (1983)	Goin' Home (1982)

George Cables chronology
Old Wine, New Bottle (1982)	Tête-à-Tête (1982)	Goin' Home (1982)

Tête-à-Tête is a duet album by saxophonist Art Pepper and pianist George Cables, recorded in 1982 and released on the Galaxy label.

== Reception ==
Professional ratings
Review scores
Source	Rating
AllMusic	4/5 stars
The Penguin Guide to Jazz Recordings	3/4 stars
The Rolling Stone Jazz Record Guide	4/5 stars

The AllMusic review by Scott Yanow noted: "Pepper never did decline on record, and although he died in June 1982 (just a month after the last of these duets), he is prime form throughout the emotional performances".

== Track listing ==
1. "Over the Rainbow" (Harold Arlen, Yip Harburg) - 6:43
2. "Tête-à-Tête" (George Cables) - 4:29
3. "Darn That Dream" (Jimmy Van Heusen, Eddie DeLange) - 4:17
4. "Body and Soul" (Johnny Green, Frank Eyton, Edward Heyman, Robert Sour) - 5:17
5. "The Way You Look Tonight" (Jerome Kern, Dorothy Fields) - 6:47
6. "'Round Midnight" (Thelonious Monk, Cootie Williams, Bernie Hanighen) - 5:40
7. "You Go to My Head" (J. Fred Coots, Haven Gillespie) - 6:04
- Recorded at Fantasy Studios in Berkeley, CA, on April 13, 1982 (track 4), April 14, 1982 (tracks 1–3, 5 & 6) and May 11, 1982 (track 7)

== Personnel ==
- Art Pepper - alto saxophone
- George Cables - piano
