= Here (Cal Tjader album) =

Live album by Cal Tjader
- Released: 1979
- Recorded: June 17–18, 1977
- Venue: Great American Music Hall, San Francisco, CA
- Genre: Jazz
- Label: Galaxy; GXY-5121
- Producer: Jim Stern

Cal Tjader chronology
| Guarabe (1977) | Here (1979) | Cuban Fantasy (1977) |

Here is a live album by vibraphonist Cal Tjader which was recorded in 1977 and released on the Galaxy label in 1979.

Professional ratings
Review scores
| Source | Rating |
|---|---|
| AllMusic | 3/5 stars |

== Track listing ==
1. "Tu Crees Que?" (Mongo Santamaria) – 6:00
2. "Liz Anne" (Cal Tjader) – 6:41
3. "Morning" (Clare Fischer) – 7:41
4. "Here" (David Mckay) – 8:14
5. "If" (David Gates) – 4:45
6. "Gary's Theme" (Gary McFarland) – 7:20

== Personnel ==
- Cal Tjader – vibraphone, timbales
- Clare Fischer – electric piano
- Bob Redfield – electric guitar
- Rob Fisher – bass, electric bass
- Pete Riso – drums
- Poncho Sanchez – congas, bongos
