= Our Delights =

1979 album by Tommy Flanagan and Hank Jones

Studio album by Tommy Flanagan and Hank Jones
- Released: 1979
- Recorded: January 28, 1978
- Studio: Fantasy, Berkeley, California
- Genre: Jazz
- Length: 46:04
- Label: Galaxy; GXY 5113
- Producer: Ed Michel

Tommy Flanagan chronology
Alone Too Long (1977)	Our Delights (1979)	More Delights (1978)

Hank Jones chronology
Groovin' High (1978)	Our Delights (1978)	More Delights (1978)

Our Delights is an album by pianists Tommy Flanagan and Hank Jones, recorded in 1978 for the Galaxy label.

== Reception ==
Professional ratings
Review scores
Source	Rating
AllMusic	4/5 stars
DownBeat	5/5 stars
The Penguin Guide to Jazz	3.5/4 stars

Douglas Clark of DownBeat wrote that "Jones and Flanagan perform impeccably throughout".

AllMusic awarded the album 4 stars, stating: "Piano duets have the potential danger of getting overcrowded and a bit incoherent, but neither happens on this rather delightful set. ...tasteful, consistently swinging and inventive within the tradition."

== Track listing ==
1. "Our Delight" (Tadd Dameron) - 5:08
2. "Autumn Leaves" (Joseph Kosma, Jacques Prévert, Johnny Mercer) - 5:39
3. "Robbins Nest" (Illinois Jacquet, Charles Thompson) - 7:19
4. "Jordu" (Duke Jordan) - 5:01
5. "Confirmation" (Charlie Parker) - 5:17
6. "A Child Is Born" (Thad Jones) - 6:19
7. "Lady Bird" (Dameron) - 3:53
8. "Robbins Nest" [Alternate Take] (Jacquet, Thompson) - 7:28 [Bonus track on CD reissue in 1992]

== Personnel ==
- Tommy Flanagan, Hank Jones - piano
