= The Montreal Tapes: with Geri Allen and Paul Motian =

Live album by Charlie Haden
- Released: 1997 (France); 1998 (U.S.A.)
- Recorded: July 1, 1989
- Venue: Quebec, Canada
- Genre: Jazz
- Length: 50:06
- Label: Verve
- Producer: Ruth Cameron

Charlie Haden chronology
None but the Lonely Heart (album) (1997)	The Montreal Tapes: with Geri Allen and Paul Motian (1997)	The Montreal Tapes: with Gonzalo Rubalcaba and Paul Motian (1997)

The Montreal Tapes: with Geri Allen and Paul Motian is a live album by the American jazz bassist Charlie Haden with pianist Geri Allen and drummer Paul Motian recorded in 1989 and released on the Verve label.

== Reception ==
The Allmusic review by Richard S. Ginell awarded the album 4½ stars, stating, "pianist Geri Allen's work is always technically adroit, often adventurous, prodding and challenging the massive-toned Haden into producing some of his most out-there work of recent years... Other tracks are thoughtfully ruminative in ways that remind one of the Keith Jarrett American quartet, of which Haden and Motian were the anchors".

Professional ratings
Review scores
Source	Rating
Allmusic	4.5/5 stars

== Track listing ==
All compositions by Charlie Haden except as indicated

1. "Blues in Motian" – 8:20
2. "Fiasco" (Paul Motian) – 11:58
3. "First Song" – 9:20
4. "Dolphy's Dance" (Geri Allen) – 6:12
5. "For John Malachi" (Allen) – 6:34
6. "In the Year of the Dragon" (Motian) – 7:36

- Recorded at the Montreal International Jazz Festival on July 1, 1989

== Personne l ==
- Charlie Haden – bass
- Geri Allen – piano
- Paul Motian – drums
