= Stepping Out (Red Garland album) =

Crossings

Studio album by Red Garland
- Released: 1981
- Recorded: July 9–10, 1979
- Studio: Fantasy Studios, Berkeley, CA
- Genre: Jazz
- Label: Galaxy; GXY-5129
- Producer: Ed Michel

Red Garland chronology
Equinox (1978)	Crossings (1981)	So Long Blues (1979)

Stepping Out is an album by pianist Red Garland, recorded in 1979 and released on the Galaxy label in 1981.

== Reception ==
Professional ratings
Review scores
Source	Rating
AllMusic	4/5 stars

The AllMusic review by Scott Yanow reads: "This particular album has some good playing by Garland in a trio with bassist Ron Carter and drummer Ben Riley; guitarist Kenny Burrell helps out on three of the six numbers. ... Garland shows that even this late in his career, he was still a fine player with a musical conception of his own."

== Track listing ==
1. "Yours Is My Heart Alone" (Franz Lehár) – 8:11
2. "You Stepped Out of a Dream" (Nacio Herb Brown, Gus Kahn) – 5:21
3. "I Wish I Knew" (Harry Warren, Mack Gordon) – 8:39
4. "Have You Met Miss Jones?" (Richard Rodgers, Lorenz Hart) – 8:39
5. "Daahoud" (Clifford Brown) – 6:05
6. "Here's That Rainy Day" (Jimmy Van Heusen, Johnny Burke) – 7:36

== Personnel ==
- Red Garland – piano
- Kenny Burrell – guitar (tracks 2, 4 and 6)
- Ron Carter – bass
- Ben Riley – drums
