= Call It Whachawana =

Jazz album recorded in 1983 by Johnny Griffin

Studio album by Johnny Griffin
- Released: 1983
- Recorded: July 25 and 26, 1983
- Studio: Fantasy Studios, Berkeley CA
- Genre: Jazz
- Label: Galaxy; GXY-5146
- Producer: Johnny Griffin, Orrin Keepnews

Johnny Griffin chronology
| Meeting (1981) | Call It Whachawana (1983) | Tough Tenors Back Again! (1984) |

Call It Whachawana is an album by saxophonist Johnny Griffin which was recorded in 1983 and released on the Galaxy label.

== Reception ==
Professional ratings
Review scores
| Source | Rating |
|---|---|
| AllMusic | 4/5 stars |

The AllMusic review by Scott Yanow stated: "The emphasis is on ballads and slower tempos on this often-exquisite outing by tenor saxophonist Johnny Griffin... Superlative music by a masterful player".

== Track listing ==
All compositions by Johnny Griffin, except where indicated.

1. "I Mean You" (Thelonious Monk) – 8:43
2. "Lover Man" (Jimmy Davis, James Sherman, Ram Ramirez) – 11:32
3. "Call It Whachawana" – 6:35
4. "A Waltz with Sweetie" – 6:38
5. "Jabbo's Revenge" (Curtis Lundy) – 7:49

== Personnel ==
- Johnny Griffin – tenor saxophone
- Mulgrew Miller – piano
- Curtis Lundy – bass
- Kenny Washington – drums
