= Goin' Home (Art Pepper and George Cables album) =

Studio album by Art Pepper and George Cables
- Released: 1982
- Recorded: May 11–12, 1982
- Studio: Fantasy Studios, Berkeley, CA
- Genre: Jazz
- Length: 50:16
- Label: Galaxy; GXY 5143
- Producer: Ed Michel

Art Pepper chronology
Tête-à-Tête (1982)	Goin' Home (1982)	Final Art (1982)

George Cables chronology
Tête-à-Tête (1982)	Goin' Home (1982)	Sleeping Bee (1983)

Goin' Home is a duet album by saxophonist Art Pepper and pianist George Cables recorded in 1982 and released on the Galaxy label.

== Reception ==
Professional ratings
Review scores
Source	Rating
AllMusic	4.5/5 stars
The Penguin Guide to Jazz Recordings	3/4 stars

In an AllMusic review, Scott Yanow wrote that Pepper "is in surprisingly strong form considering that he only had a month left to live".

== Track listing ==
1. "Goin' Home" (Traditional) – 5:28
2. "Samba Mom Mom" (Art Pepper) – 4:53
3. "In a Mellow Tone" (Duke Ellington, Milt Gabler) – 5:30
4. "Don't Let the Sun Catch You Cryin'" (Joe Greene) – 4:56
5. "Isn't She Lovely" (Stevie Wonder) – 4:10
6. "Billie's Bounce" (Charlie Parker) – 3:56
7. "Lover Man (Oh, Where Can You Be?)" (Jimmy Davis, Ram Ramirez, James Sherman) – 4:57
8. "The Sweetest Sounds" (Richard Rodgers) – 5:03
9. "Don't Let the Sun Catch You Cryin'" [alternate A] (Greene) – 5:19 Bonus track on CD reissue
10. "You Go to My Head" [alternate] (J. Fred Coots, Haven Gillespie) – 6:04 Bonus track on CD reissue

== Personnel ==
- Art Pepper – alto saxophone (tracks 2, 4, 5, 6 & 8–10), clarinet (tracks 1, 3, 5 & 7)
- George Cables – piano
