= Living on the Edge (Dewey Redman album) =

Studio album by Dewey Redman
- Released: 1991
- Recorded: September 13 & 14, 1989
- Genre: Jazz
- Length: 43:45
- Label: Black Saint
- Producer: Giovanni Bonandrini

Dewey Redman chronology
| The Struggle Continues (1982) | Living on the Edge (1991) | Choices (1992) |

Living on the Edge is an album by American jazz saxophonist Dewey Redman featuring performances recorded in 1989 for the Italian Black Saint label.

== Reception ==
The Allmusic review by Scott Yanow awarded the album 4 stars stating "The great tenor Dewey Redman has always been a versatile player and he really gets a chance to show off his individuality on this set... this is an easily recommended set of inside/outside music".

Professional ratings
Review scores
| Source | Rating |
|---|---|
| Allmusic | 4/5 stars |
| The Penguin Guide to Jazz Recordings | 3.5/4 stars |

== Track listing ==
All compositions by Dewey Redman except as indicated

1. "Boo Boodoop" - 9:46
2. "Mirror Windows" - 8:32
3. "Blues for J.A.M. Part 1" - 5:02
4. "If I Should Lose You" (Ralph Rainger, Leo Robin) - 8:07
5. "As One" - 5:58
6. "Lazy Bird" (John Coltrane) - 6:20

- Recorded at the A & R Recording Studio in New York City on September 13 & 14, 1989

== Personnel ==
- Dewey Redman - tenor saxophone, alto saxophone
- Geri Allen - piano
- Cameron Brown - bass
- Eddie Moore - drums
