= More Delights =

Studio album by Tommy Flanagan and Hank Jones
- Released: 1985
- Recorded: January 28, 1978
- Studio: Fantasy, Berkeley, California
- Genre: Jazz
- Label: Galaxy; GXY 5152
- Producer: Ed Michel

Tommy Flanagan chronology
Our Delights (1978)	More Delights (1985)	Something Borrowed, Something Blue (1978)

Hank Jones chronology
Our Delights (1978)	More Delights (1978)	Milestones (1978)

More Delights is a studio album by pianists Tommy Flanagan and Hank Jones, recorded in 1978 for the Galaxy label and released in 1985. The album features alternate takes of the piano duets released on Our Delights.

== Reception ==
Professional ratings
Review scores
Source	Rating
AllMusic	4/5 stars

AllMusic awarded the album 4 stars, stating: "These 'new' performances (plus duo versions of ''Round Midnight' and 'If You Could See Me Now') are as tasteful and as enjoyable as the 'older' ones".

== Track listing ==
1. "Robbins Nest" [Alternate Take] (Illinois Jacquet, Charles Thompson) - 7:28
2. "'Round Midnight" (Thelonious Monk, Cootie Williams, Bernie Hanighen) - 5:46
3. "Lady Bird" [Alternate Take] (Tadd Dameron) - 3:55
4. "Jordu" [Alternate Take] (Duke Jordan) - 3:57
5. "Our Delight" [Alternate Take] (Dameron) - 4:03
6. "A Child Is Born" [Alternate Take] (Thad Jones) - 5:47
7. "Autumn Leaves" [Alternate Take] (Joseph Kosma, Jacques Prévert, Johnny Mercer) - 5:44
8. "If You Could See Me Now" (Dameron) - 5:36

== Personnel ==
- Tommy Flanagan, Hank Jones - piano
