= The Montreal Tapes: with Paul Bley and Paul Motian =

Live album by Charlie Haden
- Released: October 1994
- Recorded: July 7, 1989
- Venue: Quebec, Canada
- Genre: Jazz
- Length: 61:43
- Label: Verve
- Producer: Daniel Vachon

Charlie Haden chronology
The Montreal Tapes: with Don Cherry and Ed Blackwell (1994)	The Montreal Tapes: with Paul Bley and Paul Motian (1994)	Steal Away (1995)

The Montreal Tapes: with Paul Bley and Paul Motian is a live album by the American jazz bassist Charlie Haden with pianist Paul Bley and drummer Paul Motian recorded in 1989 and released on the Verve label.

== Reception ==
The Allmusic review by Scott Yanow awarded the album 3 stars, stating, "The musical communication between the three masterful players is impressive on this generally introspective set".

Professional ratings
Review scores
Source	Rating
Allmusic	3/5 stars

== Track listing ==
All compositions by Charlie Haden except as indicated

1. "Turnaround/When Will the Blues Leave?" (Ornette Coleman) - 13:17
2. "New Beginning" - 8:47
3. "Cross Road" (Coleman) - 6:40
4. "So Far, So Good" (Paul Bley) - 7:27
5. "Ida Lupino" (Carla Bley) - 11:19
6. "Latin Genetics" (Coleman) - 4:35
7. "Body Beautiful" (Paul Motian) - 8:03
8. "Turnaround" (Coleman) - 7:51

- Recorded at the Montreal International Jazz Festival on July 7, 1989

== Personnel ==
- Charlie Haden – bass
- Paul Bley - piano
- Paul Motian - drums
