= Red and Black in Willisau =

Red and Black In Willisau

Live album by Dewey Redman & Ed Blackwell
- Released: 1985
- Recorded: August 31, 1980
- Genre: Jazz
- Length: 46:23
- Label: Black Saint
- Producer: Giovanni Bonandrini

Dewey Redman chronology
Soundsigns (1978)	Red and Black In Willisau (1985)	The Struggle Continues (1982)

Red and Black in Willisau is a live album by American jazz saxophonist Dewey Redman and drummer Ed Blackwell featuring performances recorded at the Willisau Jazz Festival in 1980 for the Italian Black Saint label.

== Reception ==
The Allmusic review by Scott Yanow awarded the album 4 stars stating "This set of live duets from the Willisau '80 Jazz Festival succeeds due to Redman's huge sound, Blackwell's colorful rhythms, and the close interplay between the two... Although some listeners will miss the usual chordal instruments (and particularly the bass), this combination works".

Professional ratings
Review scores
Source	Rating
Allmusic	4/5 stars
The Penguin Guide to Jazz Recordings	3/4 stars

== Track listing ==
All compositions by Dewey Redman

1. "Willisee" - 14:11
2. "We Hope" - 9:22
3. "F I" - 2:00
4. "Communication" - 14:10
5. "S 126 T" - 6:40

- Recorded at the Willisau Jazzfestival '80 in Switzerland on August 31, 1980

== Personnel ==
- Dewey Redman - tenor saxophone, musette
- Ed Blackwell - drums
