= Coincide (album) =

Studio album by Dewey Redman
- Released: 1974
- Recorded: September 9 & 10, 1974
- Genre: Jazz
- Length: 40:43
- Label: Impulse!
- Producer: Ed Michel

Dewey Redman chronology
The Ear of the Behearer (1973)	Coincide (1974)	Musics (1979)

Coincide is an album by American jazz saxophonist Dewey Redman featuring performances recorded in 1974 for the Impulse! label. Four performances from Coincide were included on the 1998 CD reissue of The Ear of the Behearer as bonus tracks.

== Reception ==
The Allmusic review by Scott Yanow awarded the album 4 stars stating "Dewey Redman is featured in a few different settings on this intriguing and generally successful album... Although it is interesting to hear Redman on clarinet and zither, his tenor playing is clearly his strong point and the main reason to search for this LP".

Professional ratings
Review scores
Source	Rating
Allmusic	4/5 stars
The Rolling Stone Jazz Record Guide	4/5 stars

== Track listing ==
All compositions by Dewey Redman

1. "Seeds And Deeds" - 4:50
2. "Somnifacient" - 7:13
3. "Meditation Submission Purification" - 8:13
4. "Joie De Vivre" - 3:18
5. "Funcitydues" - 3:14
6. "Phadan-Sers" - 3:40
7. "Qow" - 10:15
  - Recorded at Generation Sound Studios in New York City September 9 & 10, 1974

== Personnel ==
- Dewey Redman - tenor saxophone, clarinet, zither
- Ted Daniel - trumpet
- Leroy Jenkins - violin
- Sirone - bass
- Eddie Moore - drums, timpani, cymbal, gong, idiophone
