= Red Alert (Red Garland album) =

Studio album by Red Garland
- Released: 1978
- Recorded: December 2, 1977
- Studio: Fantasy Studios, Berkeley, CA
- Genre: Jazz
- Label: Galaxy; GXY-5109
- Producer: Ed Michel

Red Garland chronology
| Groovin' Red (1977) | Red Alert (1978) | Crossings (1977) |

Red Alert is an album by pianist Red Garland which was recorded in 1977 and released on the Galaxy label in the following year.

== Reception ==
Professional ratings
Review scores
| Source | Rating |
|---|---|
| AllMusic | 4/5 stars |
| The Penguin Guide to Jazz Recordings | 2.5/4 stars |

The AllMusic review by Scott Yanow stated "This is an interesting set, featuring pianist Red Garland with a sextet ... With one of the largest recording groups he ever led, Garland sounds fine, but the material could certainly have been more inspired".

== Track listing ==
1. "Red Alert" (Nat Adderley) – 10:34
2. "Theme for a Tarzan Movie" (Adderley) – 3:57
3. "The Whiffenpoof Song" (Guy H. Scull, Meade Minnigerode, George S. Pomeroy) – 8:20
4. "Sweet Georgia Brown" (Ben Bernie, Maceo Pinkard, Kenneth Casey) – 11:13
5. "Stella by Starlight" (Victor Young, Ned Washington) – 5:45
6. "It's Impossible" (Armando Manzanero, Sid Wayne) – 5:37

== Personnel ==
- Red Garland – piano
- Nat Adderley – cornet (tracks 1, 2 & 4)
- Harold Land (tracks 1, 4 & 5), Ira Sullivan (tracks 1, 3 & 4) – tenor saxophone
- Ron Carter – bass
- Frank Butler – drums
