= I Left My Heart... =

Live album by Red Garland
- Released: 1985
- Recorded: May 1978
- Venue: Keystone Korner, San Francisco, CA
- Genre: Jazz
- Length: 38:28
- Label: Muse; MR 5311
- Producer: Todd Barkan

Red Garland chronology
Feelin' Red (1978)	I Left My Heart... (1985)	Equinox (1979)

I Left My Heart... is a live album by pianist Red Garland featuring saxophonist Leo Wright which was recorded at Keystone Korner in 1978 and released on the Muse label in 1985.

== Reception ==
Professional ratings
Review scores
Source	Rating
AllMusic	3.5/5 stars

The AllMusic review by Scott Yanow called it an "enjoyable outing" and stated, "The set was recorded live at San Francisco's Keystone Korner and was clearly a happy occasion".

== Track listing ==
1. "Will You Still Be Mine?" (Tom Adair, Matt Dennis) – 5:52
2. "Please Send Me Someone to Love" (Percy Mayfield) – 6:13
3. "Bye Bye Blackbird" (Ray Henderson, Mort Dixon) – 6:30
4. "Body and Soul" (Johnny Green, Frank Eyton, Edward Heyman, Robert Sour) – 5:56
5. "Bags' Groove" (Milt Jackson) – 8:24
6. "I Left My Heart in San Francisco" (George Cory, Douglass Cross) – 5:33

== Personnel ==
- Red Garland – piano
- Leo Wright – alto saxophone (tracks: 4–6)
- Chris Amberger – bass
- Eddie Moore – drums
