= Montreux '77 (Tommy Flanagan album) =

Live album by Tommy Flanagan
- Released: 1977
- Recorded: July 13, 1977
- Venues: Montreux Jazz Festival, Switzerland
- Genre: Jazz
- Label: Pablo
- Producer: Norman Granz

Tommy Flanagan chronology
Eclypso (1977)	Montreux '77 (1977)	Alone Too Long (1977)

Professional ratings
Review scores
Source	Rating
AllMusic	4/5 stars
The Penguin Guide to Jazz	3/4 stars

Montreux '77 is an album by pianist Tommy Flanagan. It is a trio recording, with bassist Keter Betts and drummer Bobby Durham.

== Recording ==
The album was recorded during a concert performance at the Montreux Jazz Festival in Switzerland on July 13, 1977.

== Releases and reception ==
The album was released by Pablo Records. A subsequent CD reissue had one track – "Heat Wave" – added. An AllMusic review praised the two ballad medleys (tracks 2 & 3) and found the other tracks, with their "hard swing", even more enjoyable.

== Track listing ==
1. "Barbados" (Charlie Parker) – 9:25
2. "Some Other Spring/Easy Living" – 8:28
3. "Star Crossed Lovers/Jump for Joy" (Duke Ellington, Billy Strayhorn) – 6:56
4. "Woody 'n You" (Dizzy Gillespie) – 5:42
5. "Blue Bossa" (Kenny Dorham) – 8:08

Additional track on CD reissue

- "Heat Wave" (Irving Berlin) – 8:25

== Personnel ==
- Tommy Flanagan – piano
- Keter Betts – bass
- Bobby Durham – drums
