= Crossings (Red Garland album) =

Studio album by Red Garland, Ron Carter, Philly Joe Jones
- Released: 1978
- Recorded: December 1977
- Studio: Fantasy Studios, Berkeley, CA
- Genre: Jazz
- Length: 39:24
- Label: Galaxy; GXY-5106
- Producer: Orrin Keepnews

Red Garland chronology
Red Alert (1977)	Crossings (1978)	Feelin' Red (1978)

Crossings is an album by pianist Red Garland, bassist Ron Carter and drummer Philly Joe Jones which was recorded in late 1977 and released on the Galaxy label in the following year.

== Reception ==
Professional ratings
Review scores
Source	Rating
AllMusic	3/5 stars
The Penguin Guide to Jazz Recordings	3/4 stars

The AllMusic review by Scott Yanow stated "Amazingly enough, this set was the first time that pianist Red Garland and drummer Philly Joe Jones recorded together in a trio setting, even though they had both been a part of Miles Davis' first classic quintet. ... This is one of Garland's best later dates".

== Track listing ==
1. "Solar" (Miles Davis) – 5:07
2. "Railroad Crossing" (Ron Carter) – 5:21
3. "Never Let Me Go" (Ray Evans, Jay Livingston) – 5:15
4. "Oleo" (Sonny Rollins) – 5:15
5. "But Not for Me" (George Gershwin, Ira Gershwin) – 7:00
6. "Love for Sale" (Cole Porter) – 11:26

== Personnel ==
- Red Garland – piano
- Ron Carter – bass
- Philly Joe Jones – drums
