= The Montreal Tapes: with Don Cherry and Ed Blackwell =

Live album by Charlie Haden
- Released: July 1994
- Recorded: July 2, 1989
- Venue: Québec, Canada
- Genre: Jazz
- Length: 58:21
- Label: Verve
- Producer: Daniel Vachon and Ruth Cameron

Charlie Haden chronology
Always Say Goodbye (1994)	The Montreal Tapes: with Don Cherry and Ed Blackwell (1994)	The Montreal Tapes: with Paul Bley and Paul Motian (1994)

The Montreal Tapes: with Don Cherry and Ed Blackwell is a live album by the American jazz bassist Charlie Haden with trumpeter Don Cherry and drummer Ed Blackwell recorded at the Montreal International Jazz Festival in 1989 and released on the Verve label.

== Reception ==
The Allmusic review by Don Snowden awarded the album 4 stars, stating, "this trio lineup – call it either the original Coleman quartet sans Ornette or three-quarters of Old and New Dreams – still springs some surprises".

Professional ratings
Review scores
Source	Rating
Allmusic	4/5 stars

== Track listing ==
All compositions by Ornette Coleman except as indicated

1. "The Sphinx" – 9:31
2. "Art Deco" (Don Cherry) – 6:24
3. "Happy House" – 8:24
4. "Lonely Woman" – 11:41
5. "Mopti" (Cherry) – 5:29
6. "The Blessing" – 6:01
7. "When Will the Blues Leave?" – 4:04
8. "Law Years" – 6:46

- Recorded at the Festival de Jazz de Montreal in Canada on July 2, 1989

== Personnel ==
- Charlie Haden – bass
- Don Cherry – pocket trumpet
- Ed Blackwell – drums
