= Return of the Griffin =

Studio album by Johnny Griffin
- Released: 1979
- Recorded: October 17, 1978
- Studio: Fantasy Studios, Berkeley, CA
- Genre: Jazz
- Length: 39:40
- Label: Galaxy; GXY-5117
- Producer: Orrin Keepnews

Johnny Griffin chronology
Sincerely Ours (1978)	Return of the Griffin (1979)	Bush Dance (1978)

Return of the Griffin is an album by saxophonist Johnny Griffin, recorded in 1978 and released on the Galaxy label in the following year.

== Reception ==
Professional ratings
Review scores
Source	Rating
AllMusic	4/5 stars
The Penguin Guide to Jazz Recordings	3.5/4 stars
DownBeat	5/5 stars

The Bay State Banner wrote that the album "shows how strong and inspired Griffin can be in a quartet setting, and how dominant his soloing remains."

The AllMusic review by Scott Yanow stated: "Johnny Griffin recorded this studio album during his first visit to the United States in 15 years. ... Long one of the underrated masters, Johnny Griffin is heard at the peak of his powers on this modern bop session".

== Track listing ==
All compositions by Johnny Griffin except s indicated.

1. "Autumn Leaves" (Joseph Kosma, Johnny Mercer, Jacques Prévert) – 5:36
2. "When We Were One" – 7:42
3. "A Monk's Dream" – 6:18
4. "The Way It Is" – 5:09
5. "Fifty-Six" – 9:29
6. "I Should Care" (Axel Stordahl, Paul Weston, Sammy Cahn) – 5:26

== Personnel ==
- Johnny Griffin – tenor saxophone
- Ronnie Mathews – piano
- Ray Drummond – bass
- Keith Copeland – drums
