= Musics (album) =

Studio album by Dewey Redman
- Released: 1979
- Recorded: October 17–19, 1978
- Genre: Jazz
- Length: 42:51
- Label: Galaxy
- Producer: Ed Michel

Dewey Redman chronology
Coincide (1974)	Musics (1979)	Soundsigns (1978)

Musics is an album by American jazz saxophonist Dewey Redman featuring performances recorded in 1978 for the Galaxy label.

== Reception ==
Professional ratings
Review scores
Source	Rating
AllMusic	4.5/5 stars
DownBeat	4/5 stars
The Penguin Guide to Jazz Recordings	3.5/4 stars
The Rolling Stone Jazz Record Guide	3/5 stars

DownBeat reviewer Art Lange wrote, "Musics is a solid, satisfying tour through Dewey Redman's musical landscape—aided masterfully by Simmons' tasteful piano arabesques, bassist Helias' heroic solidity and tone, and Moore's unobtrusive, propulsive drumming—and well worth the trip".

AllMusic reviewer Scott Yanow stated: "This is one of tenor-saxophonist Dewey Redman's more accessible sessions... The music is excellent although not as explorative as most of Redman's other recordings".

== Track listing ==
All compositions by Dewey Redman except where noted.

1. "Need to Be" – 10:11
2. "The Virgin Strike March" – 5:35
3. "Alone Again (Naturally)" (Gilbert O'Sullivan) – 6:19
4. "Unknown Tongue" – 9:06
5. "One Beautiful Day" – 5:36
6. "Daystar Nightlight" – 6:04

- Recorded at Fantasy Studios in Berkeley, California on October 17–19, 1978

== Personnel ==
- Dewey Redman – tenor saxophone, musette, vocals, harp
- Fred Simmons – piano, cowbell
- Mark Helias – bass
- Eddie Moore – drums, saw, percussion, vocals
