= Birds and Ballads =

Studio album by Johnny Griffin and various artists
- Released: 1978
- Genre: Jazz
- Label: Galaxy Records

Birds and Ballads is a jazz album recorded under the leadership of Johnny Griffin, released in 1978.

Players include Art Pepper, John Klemmer, Joe Farrell, Joe Henderson, Harold Land, and the rhythm section of Stanley Cowell, Roy Haynes, Cecil McBee and John Heard.

Four of the album's eight songs are compositions by Charlie Parker, also known as "Bird", while the remaining four are ballads.

According to the liner notes, Griffin's playing is like "giving free lessons on the gentle arts of relaxation, saxophone technique, deep-seated emotional intensity and a host of other important elements to thousands of listeners in Paris, London, Copenhagen and any other centers where jazz is appreciated."

The album was reissued on CD in 1990 on Fantasy Records. A shortened version of the album was released in 1981 as Five Birds & a Monk.

== Track listing ==
1. "Billie's Bounce"
2. "'Round Midnight"
3. "Confirmation"
4. "Yardbird Suite"
5. "Over the Rainbow"
6. "Smoke Gets in Your Eyes"
7. "Good Morning Heartache"
