= Bush Dance (album) =

Studio album by Johnny Griffin
- Released: 1979
- Recorded: October 18–19, 1978
- Studio: Fantasy Studios, Berkeley, CA
- Genre: Jazz
- Label: Galaxy; GXY-5126
- Producer: Johnny Griffin, Orrin Keepnews

Johnny Griffin chronology
Return of the Griffin (1978)	Bush Dance (1979)	NYC Underground (1979)

Bush Dance is an album by saxophonist Johnny Griffin which was recorded in 1978 and released on the Galaxy label in the following year.

== Reception ==
Professional ratings
Review scores
Source	Rating
AllMusic	4.5/5 stars
The Penguin Guide to Jazz Recordings	4/4 stars
DownBeat	3/5 stars

The AllMusic review by Scott Yanow stated: "Johnny Griffin has (at least since the mid-'50s) been one of the masters of the tenor sax although consistently underrated. This studio session is one of his great achievements ... Griffin is inspired and quite creative throughout this highly recommended gem".

== Track listing ==
All compositions by Johnny Griffin, except where indicated.

1. "A Night in Tunisia" (Dizzy Gillespie, Frank Paparelli) – 17:05
2. "Bush Dance" – 4:56
3. "The JAMFs are Coming" – 6:59
4. "Since I Fell for You" (Buddy Johnson) – 7:20
5. "Knucklebean" (Eddie Marshall) – 7:18

== Personnel ==
- Johnny Griffin – tenor saxophone
- Cedar Walton – piano
- George Freeman – guitar
- Sam Jones – bass
- Albert Heath – drums
- Kenneth Nash – congas, percussion
