= Equinox (Red Garland album) =

Studio album by Red Garland
- Released: 1979
- Recorded: August 4–5, 1978
- Studio: Fantasy Studios, Berkeley, CA
- Genre: Jazz
- Label: Galaxy; GXY-5115
- Producer: Ed Michel

Red Garland chronology
I Left My Heart... (1977)	Equinox (1979)	Stepping Out (1979)

Equinox is an album by pianist Red Garland which was recorded in late 1978 and released on the Galaxy label in the following year.

Professional ratings
Review scores
Source	Rating
AllMusic	3/5 stars

== Track listing ==
1. "It's All Right with Me" (Cole Porter) – 7:35
2. "Hobo Joe" (Joe Henderson) – 5:24
3. "Equinox" (John Coltrane) – 7:03
4. "Cute" (Neal Hefti) – 3:58
5. "Nature Boy (eden ahbez) – 3:09
6. "On a Clear Day (You Can See Forever)" (Burton Lane, Alan Jay Lerner) – 6:26
7. "You Are Too Beautiful" (Richard Rodgers, Lorenz Hart) – 6:53

== Personnel ==
- Red Garland – piano
- Richard Davis – bass
- Roy Haynes – drums
