= Strike Up the Band (Red Garland album) =

Studio album by Red Garland
- Released: 1982
- Recorded: July 11–12, 1979
- Studio: Fantasy Studios, Berkeley, CA
- Genre: Jazz
- Label: Galaxy; GXY-5135
- Producer: Ed Michel

Red Garland chronology
So Long Blues (1979)	Strike Up the Band (1982)	Wee Small Hours (1980)

Strike Up the Band is an album by pianist Red Garland which was recorded in 1979 and released on the Galaxy label in 1981.

== Reception ==
Professional ratings
Review scores
Source	Rating
AllMusic	4/5 stars

The AllMusic review by Scott Yanow stated "Pianist Red Garland's final Galaxy set (he only recorded two other records before his death in 1984) is an outing with an all-star quintet ... The pianist, who had spent much of the past 16 years living in his native Texas, shows that he could still swing with the best".

== Track listing ==
1. "Straight, No Chaser" (Thelonious Monk) – 8:58
2. "Receipt, Please" (Ron Carter) – 8:47
3. "In a Sentimental Mood" (Duke Ellington) – 6:38
4. "Everything Happens to Me" (Matt Dennis, Tom Adair) – 6:25
5. "Strike Up the Band" (George Gershwin, Ira Gershwin) – 7:01

== Personnel ==
- Red Garland – piano
- Julian Priester – trombone (tracks 1–3 & 5)
- George Coleman – tenor saxophone (tracks 1, 2, 4 & 5)
- Ron Carter – bass
- Ben Riley – drums
