= Alone Too Long (album) =

Studio album by Tommy Flanagan
- Released: 1977
- Recorded: December 8, 1977
- Studio: Sound Ideas, New York City
- Genre: Jazz
- Label: Denon
- Producer: Yoshio Ozawa

Tommy Flanagan chronology
Montreux '77 (1977)	Alone Too Long (1977)	Our Delights (1978)

Alone Too Long is a solo piano album by Tommy Flanagan.

== Recording and music ==
The album was recorded on December 8, 1977, at Sound Ideas Studios, New York City. The recording was by Nippon Columbia. The compositions are a mix of standards, other jazz pieces, and three pieces by Flanagan.

== Releases ==
The album was released in Japan in 1977. It was released on CD in the United States by Denon Records in 1978.

== Critical reception ==
Professional ratings
Review scores
Source	Rating
AllMusic	4/5 stars
The Penguin Guide to Jazz	3/4 stars

In 1986, the Los Angeles Times wrote that "solo piano at its best is performed by one of the few former boppers who can bring a touch of two-handed elegance to his music."

== Track listing ==
1. "Parisian Thoroughfare" (Bud Powell) - 3:09
2. "In Your Own Sweet Way" (Dave Brubeck) - 4:19
3. "Like a Butterfly" (Tommy Flanagan) - 3:58
4. "Here's That Rainy Day" (Johnny Burke, Jimmy Van Heusen) - 3:44
5. "Alone Too Long" (Shorty Rogers, Sidney Keith 'Bob' Russell) - 3:20
6. "Maybe September" (Ray Evans, Percy Faith, Jay Livingston) - 5:04
7. "Strollin'" (Kenny Clarke) - 4:19
8. Billie Holiday Medley: 8a."Glad to Be Unhappy (Lorenz Hart, Richard Rodgers) - 3:41 / 8b."No More" (Salvador Camarata - 2:35 / 8c."That Ole Devil Called Love" (Allan Roberts, Doris Fisher) - 3:16
9. "Bean and Boys/In Walked Bud" (Coleman Hawkins, Thelonious Monk) - 7:10
10. "Ultima Thule" (Flanagan) - 2:20
11. "The Very Thought of You" (Ray Noble) - 3:31
12. "Dignified Appearance" (Flanagan) - 6:46
