= The Montreal Tapes: with Gonzalo Rubalcaba and Paul Motian =

Live album by Charlie Haden
- Released: 1997 (France); 1998 (U.S.A.)
- Recorded: July 3, 1989
- Venue: Quebec, Canada
- Genre: Jazz
- Length: 63:57
- Label: Verve
- Producer: Ruth Cameron

Charlie Haden chronology
The Montreal Tapes: with Geri Allen and Paul Motian (1997)	The Montreal Tapes: with Gonzalo Rubalcaba and Paul Motian (1997)	Night and the City (1998)

The Montreal Tapes: with Gonzalo Rubalcaba and Paul Motian is a live album by the American jazz bassist Charlie Haden with pianist Gonzalo Rubalcaba and drummer Paul Motian recorded in 1989 and released on Verve Records.

== Reception ==
An AllMusic review by Richard S. Ginell awarded the album three stars, stating, "Rubalcaba's irresistible momentum drives this session whenever he solos; all the others can do is hang onto the whirlwind. The music-making in general, though, is more tied to the mainstream than that of the companion Montreal trio album with Geri Allen, and this group doesn't have quite the same internal compatibility as that of the Allen trio... Haden's own soloing is massive and outgoing in tone; clearly, he was hugely enjoying this festival where he was given total carte blanche".

Professional ratings
Review scores
Source	Rating
Allmusic	3/5 stars

== Track listing ==
All compositions by Charlie Haden except as indicated

1. "Vignette" (Gary Peacock) - 11:14
2. "Bay City" - 10:44
3. "La Pasionaria" - 14:19
4. "Silence" - 7:48
5. "The Blessing" (Ornette Coleman) - 9:29
6. "Solar" (Miles Davis) - 10:23

- Recorded at the Festival de Jazz de Montreal in Canada on July 3, 1989

== Personnel ==
- Charlie Haden – bass
- Gonzalo Rubalcaba – piano
- Paul Motian – drums
