= Dewey Redman =

American saxophonist and composer (1931–2006)

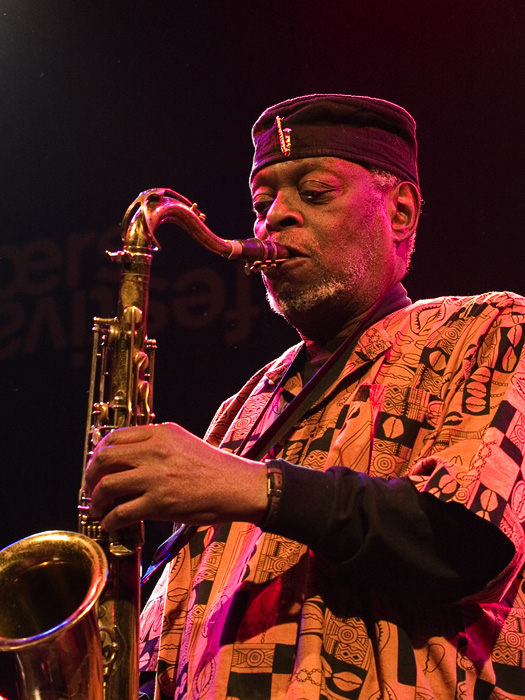
- Redman at Moers Festival, Germany, June 2006

Background information
- Born: Walter Dewey Redman; May 17, 1931; Fort Worth, Texas, United States
- Died: September 2, 2006 (aged 75) Brooklyn, New York, United States
- Genres: Jazz, avant-garde jazz, free jazz
- Occupations: Musician, composer
- Instruments: Tenor saxophone, alto saxophone, suona, clarinet
- Labels: Impulse!, Black Saint, Galaxy, ECM

Walter Dewey Redman (May 17, 1931 – September 2, 2006) was an American saxophonist who performed free jazz as a bandleader, and as a member of bands including those led by Ornette Coleman and Keith Jarrett.

Redman mainly played tenor saxophone, though he occasionally also played alto, the Chinese suona (which he called a musette), and clarinet. His son is saxophonist Joshua Redman.

== Biography ==
Redman was born in Fort Worth, Texas. He attended I.M. Terrell High School, and played in the school band with Ornette Coleman, Prince Lasha, and Charles Moffett. He was the nephew of swing-era bandleader Don Redman. After high school, he briefly enrolled in the electrical engineering program at the Tuskegee Institute in Alabama but became disillusioned with the program and returned home to Texas. In 1953, he earned a bachelor's degree in Industrial Arts from Prairie View Agricultural and Mechanical University. While at Prairie View, he switched from clarinet to alto saxophone, then to tenor. After graduating, he served for two years in the U. S. Army.

After his discharge from the Army, Redman began working on a master's degree in education at the University of North Texas. While working on his degree, he taught music to fifth graders in Bastrop, Texas and worked as a freelance saxophonist at night and weekends in Austin, Texas. In 1957, he graduated in Education with a minor in Industrial Arts. While at North Texas, he did not enroll in any music classes.

In 1959 he moved to San Francisco, resulting in a collaboration with clarinettist Donald Garrett.

Redman was best known for his 1968-1972 collaboration with saxophonist Ornette Coleman, with whom he had performed in his Fort Worth high school marching band. He also played in pianist Keith Jarrett's American Quartet (1971–1976). Jarrett's The Survivors' Suite was voted Jazz Album of the Year by Melody Maker in 1978. In the 1970s Redman formed the quartet Old and New Dreams with Don Cherry, Charlie Haden, and Ed Blackwell. They recorded four albums in the period to 1987.

Redman recorded as a sideman with Paul Motian and Pat Metheny. In 1981 he performed at the Woodstock Jazz Festival for the tenth anniversary of the Creative Music Studio. He was the subject of the award-winning documentary film Dewey Time directed by Daniel Berman (2001).

On February 19 and 21, 2004, he played tenor saxophone as a special guest with Jazz at Lincoln Center in a concert entitled "The Music of Ornette Coleman". Reviewing the performance, Howard Mandel wrote, "Redman, a veteran of Coleman's bands, played on 'Ramblin' and 'Peace', demonstrating more originality, maturity and conviction than anyone else on the bandstand."

Redman died of liver failure in Brooklyn, New York, on September 2, 2006.

== Discography ==
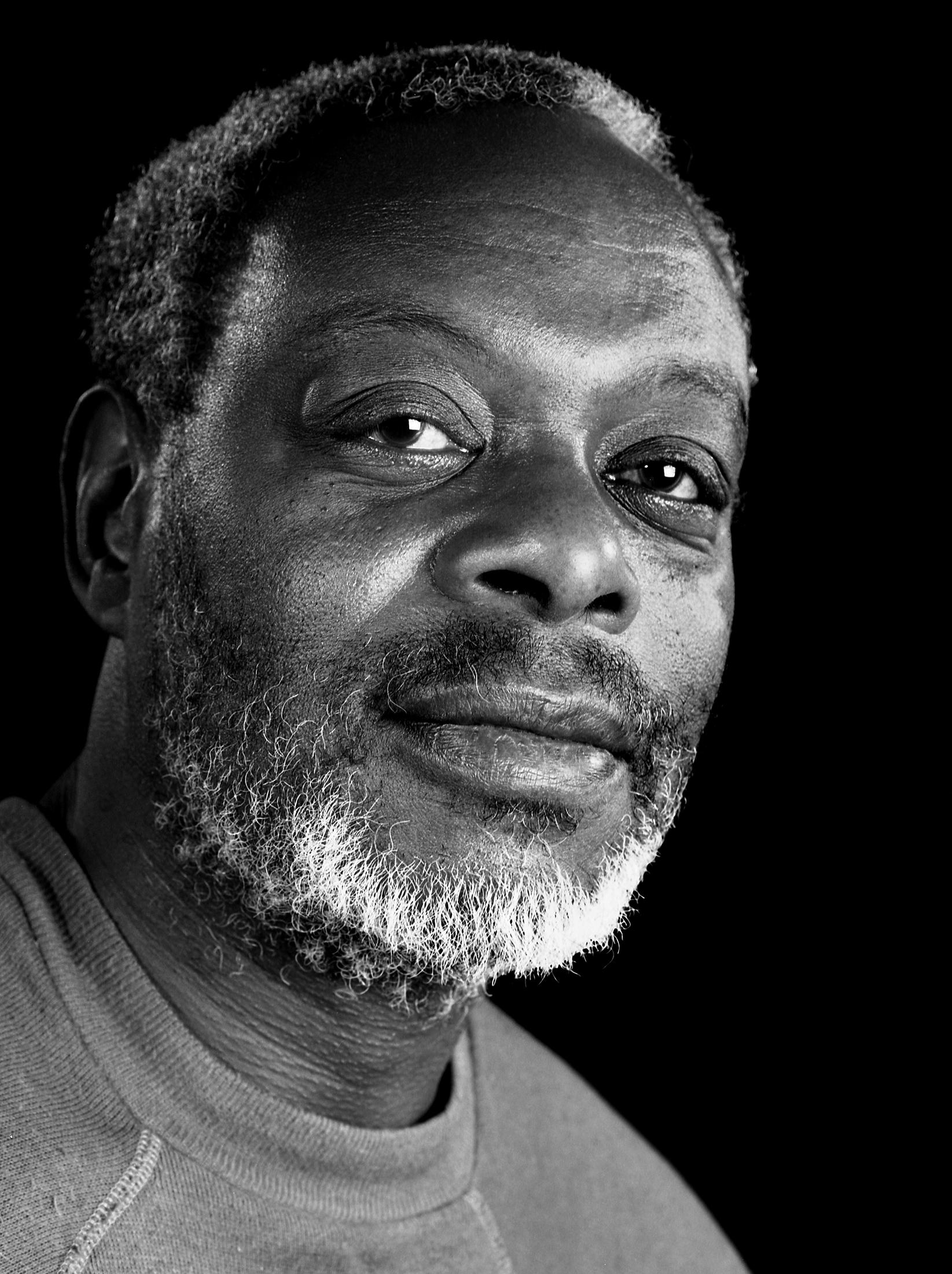
Portrait by Gert Chesi (1986)

=== As leader ===
- Look for the Black Star (Freedom, 1966; re-released on Arista Freedom in 1975)
- Tarik (BYG Actuel, 1969)
- The Ear of the Behearer (Impulse!, 1973)
- Coincide (Impulse!, 1974)
- Musics (Galaxy, 1979)
- Soundsigns (Galaxy, 1979)
- Red and Black in Willisau with Ed Blackwell (Black Saint, 1980)
- The Struggle Continues (ECM, 1982)
- Living on the Edge (Black Saint, 1989)
- Choices featuring Joshua Redman (Enja, 1992)
- African Venus featuring Joshua Redman (Evidence, 1994; re-released on Venus in 1998 as "Satin Doll") – recorded in 1992
- In London (Palmetto, 1998) – recorded in 1996
- Momentum Space with Cecil Taylor and Elvin Jones (Verve, 1999) – recorded in 1998

=== As Old and New Dreams ===
With Ed Blackwell, Don Cherry and Charlie Haden

- Old and New Dreams (Black Saint, 1976)
- Old and New Dreams (ECM, 1979)
- Playing (ECM, 1980)
- A Tribute to Blackwell (Black Saint, 1987)

=== As sideman ===
With Jane Bunnett

- In Dew Time (Dark Light, 1988)
- Radio Guantánamo: Guantánamo Blues Project, Vol. 1 (Blue Note, 2006)

With Ornette Coleman

- New York Is Now! (Blue Note, 1968)
- Love Call (Blue Note, 1968)
- Ornette at 12 (Impulse!, 1968)
- Crisis (Impulse!, 1969)
- Friends and Neighbors: Live at Prince Street (Flying Dutchman, 1970)
- Live in Paris 1971 (Jazz Row, 1971)
- The Belgrade Concert (Jazz Door, 1971)
- Science Fiction (Columbia, 1971)
- Broken Shadows (Columbia, 1971-2 [1982])
- The Complete Science Fiction Sessions (Columbia, 1971–2 [2000])

With Charlie Haden's Liberation Music Orchestra

- Liberation Music Orchestra (Impulse!, 1970)
- The Ballad of the Fallen (ECM, 1982)
- Dream Keeper (Blue Note, 1990)

With Keith Jarrett

- El Juicio (Atlantic, 1971)
- Birth (Atlantic, 1971)
- Expectations (Columbia, 1972)
- Fort Yawuh (Impulse!, 1973)
- Treasure Island (Impulse!, 1974)
- Death and the Flower (Impulse!, 1974)
- Back Hand (Impulse!, 1974)
- Shades (Impulse!, 1975)
- Mysteries (Impulse!, 1975)
- The Survivors' Suite (ECM, 1976)
- Bop-Be (Impulse!, 1977)
- Eyes of the Heart (ECM, 1979)

With Paul Motian

- Monk in Motian (JMT, 1988)
- Trioism (JMT, 1993)

With Michel Benita

- Preferences (Label Bleu, 1990)
- Soul (Label Bleu, 1993)

With others

- Jon Ballantyne, 4tets (Real Artist Works, 2000)
- Ed Blackwell, Walls–Bridges (Black Saint, 1992)
- Michael Bocian, Reverence (Enja, 1994)
- David Bond, The Key of Life (Vineyard, 2009)
- Cameron Brown, Here and How! (OmniTone, 1997)
- Don Cherry, Relativity Suite (JCOA, 1973)
- Anthony Cox, Dark Metals (Polygram, 1991)
- Mark Helias, Split Image (Enja, 1984)
- Billy Hart, Enchance (Horizon, 1977)
- Leroy Jenkins, For Players Only (JCOA, 1975)
- Pat Metheny, 80/81 (ECM, 1980)
- Roswell Rudd & The Jazz Composer's Orchestra, Numatik Swing Band (JCOA, 1973)
- Clifford Thornton & The Jazz Composers Orchestra, The Gardens of Harlem (JCOA, 1975)
- Randy Weston, The Spirits of Our Ancestors (Antilles, 1991)
- Matt Wilson, As Wave Follows Wave (Palmetto, 1996)
- Dane Belany, Motivations (Sahara, 1975)
- John Menegon, Search Light (Maki Records 2003)
