= Science Fiction (Ornette Coleman album) =

Studio album by Ornette Coleman
- Released: February 1972
- Recorded: September 9, 10 & October 13, 1971
- Studio: Columbia Studio E, New York
- Genre: Avant-garde jazz; free jazz
- Length: 37:03
- Label: Columbia

Ornette Coleman chronology
Broken Shadows (1971)	Science Fiction (1972)	Skies of America (1972)

Science Fiction is an album by the American avant-garde jazz saxophonist and composer Ornette Coleman, recorded in September and October 1971 and released on Columbia Records in February 1972.

In 2000, the album was re-released along with Broken Shadows (recorded during the same sessions but not released until 1982) and several unreleased tracks as The Complete Science Fiction Sessions.

== Recording ==
Science Fiction features Coleman's early 1970s quartet, consisting of Coleman (alto saxophone, trumpet, violin), Charlie Haden (double bass), Ed Blackwell (drums), and Dewey Redman (tenor saxophone). It also features performances by former Coleman sidemen Billy Higgins (drums), Don Cherry (pocket trumpet), and Bobby Bradford (trumpet), and vocals by Indian-American singer Asha Puthli on two tracks and American poet David Henderson on the title track.

== Reception ==
Professional ratings
Review scores
Source	Rating
AllMusic	5/5 stars
DownBeat	5/5 stars
Pitchfork	9.5/10
The Rolling Stone Jazz Record Guide	5/5 stars

The AllMusic review by Steve Huey awarded the album 5 stars and stated: "Science Fiction was [Coleman's] creative rebirth, a stunningly inventive and appropriately alien-sounding blast of manic energy... Science Fiction is a meeting ground between Coleman's past and future; it combines the fire and edge of his Atlantic years with strong hints of the electrified, globally conscious experiments that were soon to come. And, it's overflowing with brilliance". The Rolling Stone Jazz Record Guide called it "fascinating" and "multifaceted" in another five-star review. Reviewing the album for Pitchfork, Daniel Felsenthal called it "a one-of-a-kind dispatch from the vibrant, polygenic, and contested lofts of downtown New York" and "a welcome return to the singable, quintessentially Southern melodicism that counterbalanced [Coleman's] dauntless early oeuvre".

== Track listing ==
All compositions by Ornette Coleman.

1. "What Reason Could I Give?" – 3:06
2. "Civilization Day" – 6:04
3. "Street Woman" – 4:50
4. "Science Fiction" – 5:03
5. "Rock the Clock" – 3:16
6. "All My Life" – 3:56
7. "Law Years" – 5:22
8. "The Jungle Is a Skyscraper" – 5:26
- Recorded at Columbia Studio E, NYC on September 9 (tracks 2, 3, 7 and 8), September 10 (track 4) and October 13 (tracks 1, 5 and 6), 1971

== Personnel ==
- Ornette Coleman – alto saxophone, trumpet, violin
- Don Cherry – pocket trumpet (tracks 2–4)
- Bobby Bradford – trumpet (tracks 4, 7–8)
- Carmine Fornarotto, Gerard Schwarz – trumpet (tracks 1 and 6)
- Dewey Redman – tenor saxophone, musette (tracks 1, 4–8)
- Charlie Haden – double bass, electric double bass with wah-wah pedal
- Billy Higgins – drums (tracks 1–4, 6)
- Ed Blackwell – drums (tracks 1, 4–8)
- David Henderson – recitation (track 4)
- Asha Puthli – vocals (tracks 1, 6)
