= Broken Shadows =

Studio album by Ornette Coleman
- Released: 1982
- Recorded: September 9, 1971 and September 7 & 8, 1972
- Genre: Jazz
- Length: 50:37
- Label: Columbia
- Producer: Jim Fishel

Ornette Coleman chronology
Friends and Neighbors: Live at Prince Street (1970)	Broken Shadows (1982)	Science Fiction (1972)

Broken Shadows is an album by the American jazz saxophonist and composer Ornette Coleman recorded in 1971, at the same sessions that produced Science Fiction, but not released on the Columbia label until 1982.

The contents of the album were included in the 2000 compilation The Complete Science Fiction Sessions.

== Reception ==
Professional ratings
Review scores
Source	Rating
AllMusic	3/5 stars
The Rolling Stone Jazz Record Guide	5/5 stars

The AllMusic review by Scott Yanow stated: "Cut prior to Coleman's formation of Prime Time, these performances serve as an unintentional retrospective of his career up to that point".

Robert Palmer of The New York Times called Broken Shadows "a wonderful album," and stated that, in relation to Science Fiction, it is "quite possibly a better album... and certainly in that league." Palmer praised "Good Girl Blues," describing it as "an extravagantly imaginative updating of the Southwestern jump blues that Mr. Coleman played as a young man," and commenting: "The tune is weird, perhaps a little disorienting. Listening to it is something like finding yourself between stations on the radio, with the blues in one ear and an atonal woodwind quintet in the other."

Writing for The Washington Post, Geoffrey Himes commented: "The... release finds Coleman at a midpoint between his turbulent free jazz pioneering and just as turbulent harmolodic work. In 1972, he had slowed down enough to reveal his gift for pensive melodies and populist blues."

== Track listing ==
All compositions by Ornette Coleman

1. "Happy House" – 9:50
2. "Elizabeth" – 10:30
3. "School Work" – 5:40
4. "Country Town Blues" – 6:27
5. "Broken Shadows" – 6:45
6. "Rubber Gloves" – 3:26
7. "Good Girl Blues" – 3:07
8. "Is It Forever" – 4:52
  - Recorded at Columbia Studio E, NYC on September 9, 1971 (tracks 1–5), and September 7 & 8, 1972 (tracks 6–8)

== Personnel ==
- Ornette Coleman – alto saxophone, trumpet, violin
- Don Cherry – pocket trumpet (tracks 1, 2, 4 & 5)
- Bobby Bradford (tracks 1–3 & 5) – trumpet
- Dewey Redman – tenor saxophone, musette (tracks 1–3 & 5–8)
- Charlie Haden – bass
- Billy Higgins (tracks 1, 2, 4 & 5), Ed Blackwell (tracks 1–3 & 5–8) – drums
- Jim Hall – guitar (tracks 7 & 8)
- Cedar Walton – piano (tracks 7 & 8)
- Webster Armstrong – vocals (tracks 7 & 8)
- Uncredited woodwinds (tracks 7 & 8)
