= Ain't Misbehavin' (Hank Jones album) =

Studio album by Hank Jones
- Released: 1979
- Recorded: August 5 & 6, 1978; Fantasy Studios, Berkeley, CA
- Genre: Jazz
- Length: 37:38
- Label: Galaxy; GXY 5123
- Producer: Ed Michel

Hank Jones chronology
The Great Tokyo Meeting (1978)	Ain't Misbehavin' (1979)	Easy to Love (1979)

Ain't Misbehavin' is an album by pianist Hank Jones featuring tunes associated with Fats Waller recorded in 1978 for the Galaxy label and released in 1985.

== Reception ==
Professional ratings
Review scores
Source	Rating
Allmusic	4/5 stars
The Penguin Guide to Jazz Recordings	3/4 stars
DownBeat	4/5 stars

Allmusic awarded the album 4 stars, stating: "When this set (reissued on CD) was recorded, Hank Jones was the pianist in the Broadway show Ain't Misbehavin', a revue that celebrated Fats Waller's music. Jones never sounded like Waller, being a swing-to-bop transition player rather than a stride pianist, and he makes no effort to copy Fats during this brief program. ...Swinging if not particularly memorable music".

DownBeat assigned the album 4 stars. Reviewer Jon Balleras wrote that the album is "Jones’ tribute to one of his first and most formative influences, Fats Waller. Recorded while Jones served as pianist/conductor of the identically titled Broadway musical celebrating Waller’s life, Jones sympathetically and flexibly evokes Waller’s piano style in this small group setting. Although Jones' playing is far more melodically and harmonically intricate . . . Jones’ perception of Waller’s sense of the comic and, above all, of Waller’s rhythmic joie de vivre is complete and compelling".

== Track listing ==
1. "Ain't Misbehavin'" (Fats Waller, Harry Brooks, Andy Razaf) - 6:38
2. "Lounging at the Waldorf" (Waller) - 6:20
3. "Mean to Me" (Fred E. Ahlert, Roy Turk) - 5:41
4. "The Joint is Jumpin'" (Waller, Razaf, J. C. Johnson) - 4:28
5. "Honeysuckle Rose" (Waller, Razaf) - 6:04
6. "Squeeze Me" (Waller, Clarence Williams) - 8:27

== Personnel ==
- Hank Jones - piano
- Richard Davis - double bass
- Roy Haynes - drums
- Bob Ojeda - trumpet (tracks 1, 3 & 5)
- Teddy Edwards - tenor saxophone (tracks 1, 3 & 5)
- Kenny Burrell - guitar (tracks 1, 3 & 5)
