= Salvatore Bonafede =

Italian composer and pianist

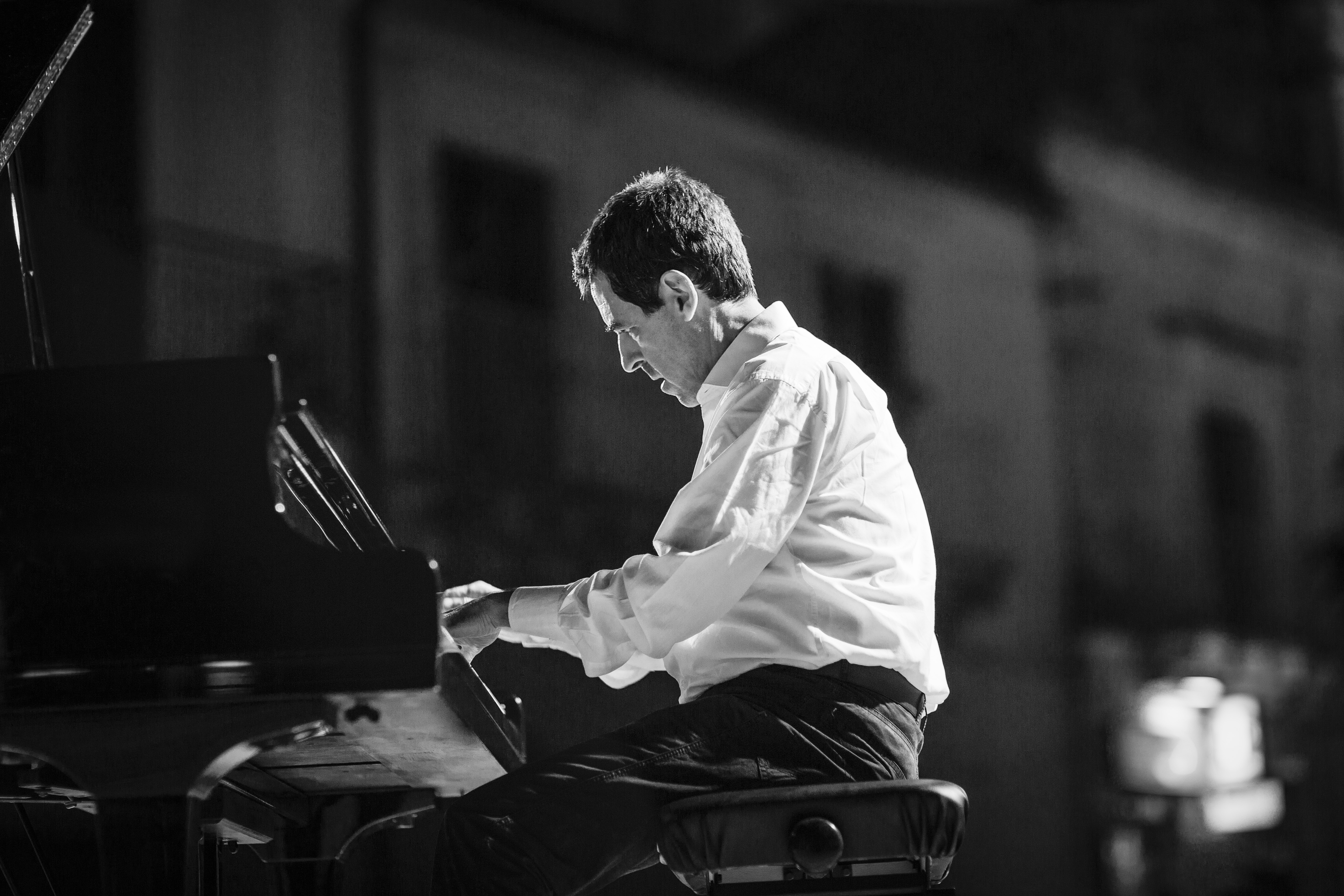
- Salvatore Bonafede in 2015

Background information
- Born: August 4, 1962 (age 64); Palermo, Italy
- Genre: Jazz
- Occupations: Musician, composer
- Instrument: Piano
- Years active: 1975–present
- Labels: Red Records, Fonit Cetra

Salvatore Bonafede (born in Palermo on August 4, 1962) is an Italian composer and pianist.

== Early life ==
The son of jewellers, Salvatore Bonafede was born in Palermo on 4 August 1962. His father, Antonino Bonafede, was a self-taught jazz pianist and a follower of Erroll Garner. Through his father's influence Salvatore became interested in jazz and began playing the piano at the age of four. His early experiences date back to the early 1970s at the Brass Group Jazz Club in Palermo, Italy playing in jam sessions with Dexter Gordon, Joe Albany, Woody Shaw, Irio De Paola and Giorgio Gaslini.

In 1973 he made his first engagement as a jazz pianist in the Italian National Television Rai 1 program Sapere: Jazz in Italy conducted by Franco Cerri, followed by his participation in the television programs Chitarra and Fagotto (Rai 2, 1975), in which he performed with the RAI television orchestra, and Di Jazz in Jazz (Rai 2, 1978).

He studied classical music at the Conservatory of Palermo from 1974 to 1981, where he currently holds the chair in jazz piano. From 1984 to 1986, while performing both as a leader and as a sideman with Bob Berg, Steve Grossman and Lew Tabackin, he was also the pianist of the Brass Group Big Band of Palermo, playing with Sam Rivers, Archie Shepp, Pete Rugolo, Paul Jeffrey, Ernie Wilkins, Lester Bowie and Toshiko Akiyoshi.

== United States (1986-1994) ==
In 1986 he won a scholarship to attend Berklee College of Music in Boston and moved to the U.S.

In Boston he started playing as a sideman in the bands of Roy Okutani, Bill Thompson, Hal Crook, eorge Garzone, Rnd Bruce Gertz, teachers of his at Berklee.

Between 1986 and 1989 he studied percussion with Alan Dawson and also studied privately with Charlie Banacos. He continued his classical piano studies with Emanuel Zambelli at Berklee College and saxophone with Jerry Bergonzi, with whom he started a professional musical partnership which resulted in two tours in Australia (1987 and 1988) and one in Italy (1988) . He also made three albums as a sideman with Jerry Bergonzi.

He collaborated steadily with the Brandeis University Jazz Big Band conducted, in those years, by Ricky Ford.

In 1989 he graduated from Berklee College of Music and in the same year he moved to New York where he stayed until 1994.

Between 1989 and 1994 in New York he studied privately with Paul Bley, Dave Holland, Lee Konitz, Andy LaVerne, Hal Galper and Richie Beirach. He met saxophonist Joe Lovano who hired him as his sideman and with whom he formed a professional bond and friendship. He also, many times, played with musicians Bill Stewart, Joshua Redman, Mark Turner, Bob Mintzer, Charlie Mariano, Randy Brecker, Lew Tabackin, Dewey Redman, Tom Harrell and Judy Silvano. Also in this period he played with the Mel Lewis Orchestra (now called Vanguard Jazz Orchestra) in which he replaced the pianist Kenny Werner for a season at the Village Vanguard.

In addition to his musical activity he taught at Harvard University (Cambridge, Massachusetts, 1988), the South Australian C.A.E School of Music (Adelaide, Australia, 1989), and the Concord Community Music School (Concord, New Hampshire, 1989).

In New York he also started his recording career as leader (both as a pianist and as a composer). In 1990 he recorded his first album for the Japanese label Ken Music, Actor-Actress, leading a quartet featuring Joe Lovano, Cameron Brown and Adam Nussbaum. In 1991, for the same label, he recorded Plays, a second album made up of his own compositions, leading a trio with Marc Johnson and Paul Motian with whom he toured Italy together with Joe Lovano in 1992.

== Back in Italy (1994-present) ==
In 1994 he came back to Italy and settled in Palermo. Since then he has been touring both as a sideman and as a leader with Tom Harrell (1996), John Scofield (1996), Joe Lovano (1997, 2003, 2010); Bobby Watson (1997 and 1998), Sheila Jordan (1999), Norma Winstone (1999, 2000, 2003), Eddie Gomez (2010 to present), and has performed with Maria Pia De Vito, Roberto Ottaviano, Pierre Vaiana, Lee Konitz, Tony Scott, Eliot Zigmund, Peter Erskine, John Abercrombie, Adam Rogers, Kurt Rosenwinkel, Ralph Towner, Esperanza Spalding, Jeff Ballard.

He has taken part in multi-ethnic jazz projects, some of which were conceived by the saxophonist Pierre Vaiana with whom he has been collaborating since 1990 (in France, Belgium, Italy, Tunisia, Algeria, Congo and Haiti) and others by the saxophonist Luigi Cinque (in Italy, Portugal, Spain, Colombia, Brazil, Libya and Turkey).

Since 1997 he has taught at music conservatories in Italy. He has been tenured since 2001 and has been invited to teach master classes and workshops by Italian and international institutes Jazz nights (Lagnau I.E., Switzerland), Facoltà di Lettere e Filosofia (Palermo, Italy), Festival Internazionale del Jazz – Esplorazioni (RoccellaJonica, RC, Italy), Roma Jazz's Cool (Rome, Italy), Saint Louis Music Center (Rome, Italy), Academy of Music in Gdańsk (Poland), ArtEZ Conservatorium (Enschede, Netherlands), Conservatoire communal des Arts Albdelmoumen Bentobel (Constantine, Algeria), Academy of Music Franz Liszt (Weimar, Germany), Académie International d'Eté de Wallonie (Libramont, Belgium), Centre Culturel Fokal (Port-au-Prince, Haiti).

Since 2016 Bonafede has published music education books with Roberta Viviana Giuffrida.

== Cinema and theater ==
Many influences and references to his composing activity derive from the world of motion pictures; his first album, entitled Actor-Actress (1990), and many of his compositions (recorded in approximately 80 albums, 20 of which are his) are dedicated to films, directors and actors.

Since 2001 he has collaborated with directors Daniele Ciprì and Franco Maresco as a soundtrack composer both for the cinema and for the theatre, winning several awards, including Best Soundtrack and a nomination for Nastro d'Argento for Best Score (Il ritorno di Cagliostro) in 2003 and Come inguaiammo il cinema italiano – La vera storia di Franco e Ciccio, in 2004.

Since his return to Sicily he has worked continuously with director Franco Maresco both in cinema (Io sono Tony Scott ovvero come l'Italia fece fuori il più grande clarinettista del jazz, 2010, Belluscone, Una storia siciliana, 2014, winner of the David di Donatello award, Gli uomini di questa città io non li conosco – Vita e teatro di Franco Scaldati, 2015, La mia battaglia. Franco Maresco incontra Letizia Battaglia, 2016), and in the theatre (Lucio, 2014 and Tre di coppie, 2016 by Franco Scaldati). He also takes part in concert-shows conceived by Franco Maresco, such as Tony's Dream– Tributo a Tony Scott and Jass – Ovvero quando il jazz parlava siciliano (inauguration of the Turin International Book Fair 2017 edition, together with Franco Maresco, Stefano Zenni, Gabriele Mirabassi and Alessandro Presti) and Joe Lovano plays John Coltrane –Tributo a John Coltrane (1926-1967), (together with Joe Lovano, Pietro Ciancaglini and Marcello Pellitteri).

In 2004 Bonafede released an album, Journey to Donnafugata, dedicated to the film The Leopard by Luchino Visconti made up of originals and revisited music of Nino Rota. This work kept him busy for two years during which time he went back to the places and the locations in which the film was shot. The project, which started as an album, developed both into live performances and into stage shows.

He has also been chosen by some directors as an actor.

== Discography ==
=== As leader & co-leader ===
- Actor Actress (Ken Music, 1990) with Cameron Brown, Adam Nussbaum, Joe Lovano
- Salvatore Bonafede Trio Plays (Ken Music, 1991) with Marc Johnson, Paul Motian
- Nobody's Perfect (Penta Flowers, 1992) with Giorgio Rosciglione, Ettore Fioravanti, Franco Piana
- You (Beat Records, 1996) piano solo
- Plays Gershwin (Splasc(H), 1998) with Cameron Brown, Michael Sarin
- Ortodoxa (Red Record, 2001) with Pietro Ciancaglini, Roberto Gatto, Fabrizio Bosso, Rosario Giuliani
- Journey to Donnafugata (Cam Jazz, 2004)
- Paradoxa (Red Record, 2005)
- For the Time Being (Cam Jazz, 2005)
- Dream and Dreams (Cam Jazz, 2006)
- Sicilian Opening (Jazz Eyes, 2010)
- Caro Luca (Red Records, 2021)
- SAL (serenity and love) (MEM Music Hong Kong, 2024)
- Live in Carini (Open Jazz Club, 2025) with Dario Deidda, Mimmo Cafiero
- ...E Vui Durmiti Ancora! (Paradoxa, 2026) with BDE (Before Dreams End)
- Mi Votu e Mi Rivotu (Paradoxa, 2026) with BDE (Before Dreams End)
- Cu Ti Lu Dissi (Paradoxa, 2026) with BDE (Before Dreams End)
- Senza Fine (Paradoxa, 2026) with Gaetano Riccobono
- Modus Operandi (Red Records, 2026) with Eddie Gomez, Billy Hart

=== As sideman ===
With Jerry Bergonzi

- Caught in the Act! (Not Fat, 1988)
- Jerry On Red (Red Record, 1989)
- Inside Out (Red Record, 1990)
- Tilt (Red Record, 1991)

With others

- Jamie Baum, Undercurrents (Konnex, 1992)
- Michael Formanek, Low Profile (Enja, 1994)
- Judi Silvano, Dancing Voices (JSL, 1992)

== Cinema ==
- Tutti for Louis - Omaggio a Louis Armstrong 1900-2000 (actor), directed by Daniele Ciprì and Franco Maresco (2001) - Documentary
- Miles gloriosus - Tributo a Miles Davis 1926-1991 (actor), directed by Daniele Ciprì and Franco Maresco (2001) - Documentary
- Il ritorno di Cagliostro (music composer), directed by Daniele Ciprì and Franco Maresco (2003)
- Come inguaiammo il cinema italiano - La vera storia di Franco e Ciccio (music composer), directed by Daniele Ciprì and Franco Maresco (2004)
- Palermo, una città lunga un sogno (music composer), directed by Mario Bellone (2006) – Documentary
- Lavoro Liquido (music composer), directed by Michele Cinque (2008) – Documentary
- Io sono Tony Scott ovvero Come l’Italia fece fuori il più grande clarinettista del jazz (actor), directed by Franco Maresco (2010)
- A tutto tonno (music composer), directed by Antonio Bellia (2010) - Documentary
- Transeuropæ Hotel (music composer and actor), directed by Luigi Cinque (2012)
- Belluscone. Una storia siciliana (music composer), directed by Franco Maresco (2014)
- Gli uomini di questa città io non li conosco – Vita e teatro di Franco Scaldati (music composer), directed by Franco Maresco (2015) - Documentary
- Sicily Jass (music composer and actor), directed by Michele Cinque, (2015)
- La mia battaglia. Franco Maresco incontra Letizia Battaglia (music composer), directed by Franco Maresco (2016) - Documentary

== Television ==
- Sapere: il Jazz in Italia (RAI 1, 1974)
- Chitarra e Fagotto (RAI 2, 1975)
- Di Jazz in Jazz (RAI 2, 1978)
- Tandem (RAI 2, 1986)
- Viva il jazz (RAI 1, 1999)
- Millennium – La Notte del 2000 (RAI1 and RAI2, Italy, 1999–2000)
- En Territorio Intimo (TV series – Spain, from 2000 to 2007)
- Emmerdale (TV series – Finland, 2003)
- Emmerdale Farm (TV series – Sweden, 2003, 2004, 2006, 2007)
- Emmerdale Omnibus (TV series – UK, 2004, 2005)
- I migliori nani della nostra vita (LA7, Italy, 2006)
- Teenage Dreams (TV series Israel, 2006, 2007, 2008, 2013)
- Musicultura Festival (RAI 2, 2007)
- Ai confini della pietà (LA7, 2007)
- Il Caffè (RAI International, 2008)
- Jazz: la musica più comica del mondo (RAI 3, 2009)
- Jazz Life (Red TV, 2009)
- Le stelle di Capri, Hollywood (RAI Extra, 2009)
- Letterature 2009: 8º Festival Internazionale di Roma (RAI 2, 2010)

== Radio ==
- Rai Tre Jazz Club (Rai Radio 3, 2001)
- Invenzioni a due voci (Rai Radio 3, 2001, 2003)
- Rai Radio Tre (Rai radio 3, 2003)
- I concerti del Quirinale (Rai RadioTre, 2003)
- I concerti del mattino (Rai RadioTre, 2003, 2005)
- Zeppelin (Rai Radio Due, 2010)
- Radio3 Suite (Rai Radio 3, 2011)
- Le Monde est un Village (RTBF, Belgio, 2013)

== Theatre ==
- La Ballata del Sale di Salvo Licata (directed by Maurizio Scaparro, 1983)
- Sinfonia dei due Mondi (directed by Jérôme Savary, 1999)
- Marocco (directed by Claudio Collovà, 2000)
- Palermo può attendere (directed by Daniele Ciprì and Franco Maresco, 2002)
- Viva Palermo e Santa Rosalia (directed by Daniele Ciprì and Franco Maresco, 2005)
- Inventario Siculo-Palermitanesco (directed by Daniele Ciprì and Franco Maresco, 2007)
- Al Buio (directed by Romano Usai, 2008)
- Donna di Cuori. Favola nera di una ribelle (directed by Mario Di Caro, 2009)
- Le Notti di Segesta: La Notte del Gattopardo (directed by Alfio Scuderi, 2013)
- Lucio di Franco Scaldati (directed by Franco Maresco, 2014)
- Tre di Coppie di Franco Scaldati (directed by Franco Maresco, 2016)
- La Catastròfa di Paolo Di Stefano (directed by Marie Vaiana, 2016)
- Guerrin Meschino di Gesualdo Bufalino (directed by Carlo Quartucci, 2017)

== DVD ==
- Alentejo Story Concert regia Michele Cinque (MRF5, 2006)
- Jazz Confusion regia Fabio Badolato e Jonny Costantino (BACO Productions, 2006)
- Su contu de Sarroch regia Romano Usai (Art’In Produzioni, 2009)

== Scores ==
- The European Real Book (Sher Music Co., 2005)
- Italian Jazz Real Book (Carish, 2005)
- The Real Easy Book Vol.3 (Sher Music Co., 2007)

== Publications ==
- Grande Dizionario degli Accordi in tutte le Tonalità with Roberta Giuffrida (Volontè & Co., 2016)
- Grande Dizionario degli Accordi con Rivolti in tutte le Tonalità with Roberta Giuffrida (Volontè & Co., 2017)
