= Cab Kaye =

English jazz musician (1921–2000)

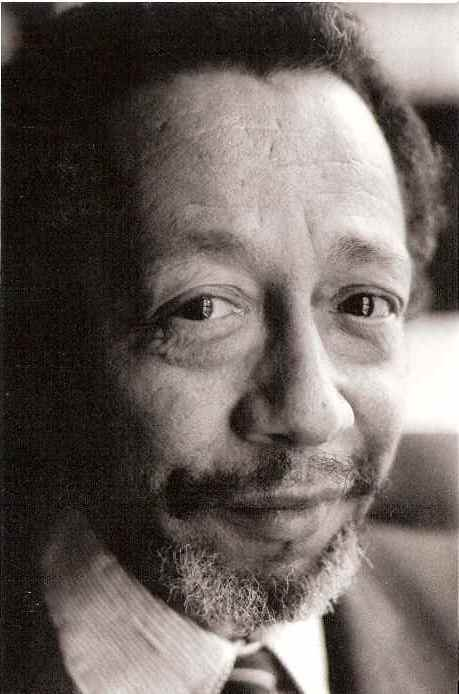
- Photo Dixie Solleveld

Background information
- Also known as: Cab Quaye, Cab Quay, Kwamlah Quaye, Kwamla Quaye, Nii Lante Quaye, Kab Kay
- Born: Nii-lante Augustus Kwamlah Quaye; 3 September 1921; London, England
- Origin: Camden, London, England
- Died: 13 March 2000 (aged 78) Amsterdam, The Netherlands
- Genres: Jazz, blues
- Occupations: Singer, musician, composer
- Instruments: Vocals, piano, guitar, drums
- Years active: 1936–96

Nii-lante Augustus Kwamlah Quaye (3 September 1921 – 13 March 2000), known professionally as Cab Kaye, was an English jazz singer and pianist of Ghanaian descent. He combined blues, stride piano, and scat with his Ghanaian heritage.

== Early life ==
Cab Kaye, also known as Cab Quay, Cab Quaye and Kwamlah Quaye, was born on St Giles High Street in Camden, London, to a musical family. His Ghanaian great-grandfather was an asafo warrior drummer and his grandfather, Henry Quaye, was an organist for the Methodist Mission church in the former Gold Coast, now called Ghana. Cab's mother, Doris Balderson, sang in English music halls and his father, Caleb Jonas Quaye (born 1895 in Accra, Ghana), performed under the name Ernest Mope Desmond as musician, band leader, pianist and percussionist. With his blues piano style, Caleb Jonas Quaye became popular around 1920 in London and Brighton with his band The Five Musical Dragons in Murray's Club with, among others, Arthur Briggs, Sidney Bechet and George "Bobo" Hines.

When Kaye was four months old, his father was killed in a railway accident in Blisworth, Northamptonshire, on 27 January 1922, on his way to perform in a concert. Kaye, his mother, and his sister Norma moved to Portsmouth, where a life insurance policy provided temporary financial support. Between the ages of nine and twelve, he spent three years in hospital while a tumor in his neck was irradiated. British radiation therapy was still in its infancy, and Kaye's treatment was experimental. A scar remained on the left side of his neck.

His first instruments were timpani, introduced to him by a Canadian soldier who taught him how to count and use the mallets. At fourteen, Kaye began to visit nightclubs where black musicians were welcome, such as The Shim Sham and The Nest; he won first prize in a song contest, a tour with the Billy Cotton band. During this tour, he met the African-American trombonist and tap dancer Ellis Jackson. Jackson convinced Cotton to engage Kaye as an assistant and as a singer in his band. Engaged as a tap dancer with Billy Cotton's show band in 1936, Kaye recorded his first song, "Shoe Shine Boy", under the name Cab Quay.

== The war years ==
During 1937, Kaye played drums and percussion with Doug Swallow and his band in April, the Hal Swain Band in the summer, and Alan Green's band in September in Hastings, England. Until 1940, he sang and drummed with the Ivor Kirchin Band, with Steve Race on piano, in the Paramount Dance Hall on Tottenham Court Road, London, where he was one of the only black people around. When a guest was refused entrance because of their skin colour, Kaye refused to perform. The incident led to the regular acceptance of black people, and the Paramount Dance Hall grew into a sort of "Harlem of London". After a short period with Britain's first black swing band leader, Ken Snakehips Johnson (and His Rhythm Swingers), Kaye played in several radio broadcasts. Shortly thereafter he joined the British Merchant Navy, which provided support services to the allies during World War II. Three days after Kaye enlisted, Ken "Snakehips" Johnson and saxophonist David Williams were killed on 8 March 1941, when a bomb fell on the Café de Paris nightclub in London's West End where they were performing. Around this time Kaye's mother was also killed when her house in Portsmouth was the only house on her street to be hit by a bomb.

While on leave from the Merchant Navy, Kaye sang with Don Mario Barretto in London. His ship was hit by a torpedo in the Pacific Ocean in 1942. He was saved, but the convoy continued to be attacked by enemy ships, and during the following three nights two other ships were sunk. These experiences stayed with him for the rest of his life. En route to an Army hospital in New York he was hurt when his plane crashed before landing. While recuperating in New York, he went to concerts and played in clubs in Harlem and Greenwich Village with Roy Eldridge, Sandy Williams, Slam Stewart, Pete Brown, Charlie Parker, Dizzy Gillespie, and Willie "The Lion" Smith. The story was told in a two-page article in Melody Maker (December 1942) headlined: "TORPEDOED... SHIPWRECKED... INJURED... BUT HE MET ALL THE SWING STARS!" After his return to London, Kaye sang in February and April 1943 with clarinettist Harry Parry.

== After the war ==
In 1946, Cab Kaye sang for the British troops in Egypt and India with Leslie "Jiver" Hutchinson's "All Coloured Band". After that, he performed as a singer and entertainer in Belgium. In 1947, he returned to London to sing in the bands of guitarist Vic Lewis, trombonist, Ted Heath, accordionist Tito Burns, and the band Jazz in the Town Hall. That year, he was voted number thirteen by readers of Melody Maker in their annual jazz poll.

From 1948 he performed mainly as leader of his bands, such as the Ministers of Swing with saxophonists Ronnie Scott and Johnny Dankworth and pianist Denis Rose. For the new wave of London musicians from the West Indies, as well as English musicians, Kaye was an inspiration as band leader. In 1949 he played with Tommy Pollard (piano, accordion, vibes), Cecil Jacob "Flash" Winston (drums, vocals and piano) and Paul Fenhoulet's Orchestra. On 13 October 1949 Kaye recorded with clarinettist Keith Bird and The Esquire Six.

In this period he also led Cab Kaye and his Coloured Orchestra and co-led The Cabinettes with Ronnie Ball, featuring "blues singer" Mona Baptiste from Trinidad. Both bands played regularly in the Fabulous Feldman Club (100 Oxford Street, London), featuring Kaye on electric guitar. Kaye's band was, in 1948, the first musical ensemble featuring people of colour to play in Amsterdam's Concertgebouw. With his All Coloured Band, featuring Dave Wilkins, Henry Shalofsky (Hank Shaw) and Sam Walker, Cab Kaye then toured in France, Belgium, Germany, and the Netherlands in 1950 and 1951.

In Paris at the end of the 1940s early 1950s, Kaye met Tadd Dameron, who was playing with Miles Davis. Dameron gave Kaye his first and only piano lesson. In the Club St. Germain, Kaye played with guitarist Django Reinhardt, who had become more interested in bebop. Also in Paris, Kaye reunited with Roy Eldridge, who introduced him to Don Byas. The Ringside was frequented by such jazz musicians as Art Simmons, Annie Ross, James Moody, Pierre Michelot, and Babs Gonzales.

In 1950. Kaye played in the Netherlands. In March 1950, he performed in the Rotterdam club Parkzicht with jazz trumpeter Dave Wilkins from Barbados, Jamaican tenor saxophonist and clarinetist George Tyndale, Sam Walker (tenor sax), Cyril Johnson (piano), Rupert Nurse (bass), Cliff Anderson (drums), and Chico Eyo (bongos). A performance with the Skymasters was recorded by the Dutch radio network AVRO in May 1950. In 1951, Kaye recorded for Astraschall Records in Germany with George Tyndale (tenor sax), Dave Wilkins (trumpet), Sam Walker (tenor sax), Cyril Johnson (piano), Owen Stephens (bass) and Aubrey Henry (drums). Kaye also regularly accompanied saxophonist Don Byas on piano in the early 1950s.

== The 1950s and Hot Sauce ==
Between December 1950 and May 1951, Kaye's Latin American Band was booked by Lou van Rees to tour France, Germany, and the Netherlands (where Kaye met Charlie Parker). In the Netherlands, Kaye played in the newly opened Avifauna in Alphen aan den Rijn, the world's first bird park.

In 1951, Kaye played a small role in the movie Sensation in San Remo directed by Georg Jacoby. Although the New Musical Express announced "Cab Kaye gets Big Film Break" on 20 March 1953, the movie was unsuccessful, though he would return to films. In the Montpellier Buttery Club he organized dance contests: cha-cha, mambo, and jive. In 1952, he recorded with the Gerry Moore Trio on 1 March, and the Norman Burns Quintet on 17 May. From late 1952 to mid-1953, he played with drummer Tommy Jones from Liverpool and bassist/guitarist Brylo Ford from Trinidad. In 1953, Ford and Deacon Jones (drums) played in a trio of that appeared in the movie Blood Orange directed by Terence Fisher.

Kaye led multi-ethnic bands usually consisting of musicians from the UK, Africa, and the West Indies. Later that year he was in the revue Memories of Jolson, a musical with sixteen-year-old Shirley Bassey. The show toured Scotland, but Kaye left after the first performance because he thought the show was racist. He turned to variety shows, according to Melody Maker in 1953, and he founded a theatre booking agency, Black and White Productions, to book small theatre and film roles for himself and other musicians. His career as a businessman was brief, and he returned to music.

In 1953, he worked with Mary Lou Williams. The group included Dizzy Reece (trumpet), Pat Burke (tenor sax), Dennis Rose (piano), Denny Coffey (bass), and Dave Smallman (bongos, congas). They accompanied dancer Josie Woods and performed as Cab Kaye's Jazz Septet at the London Palladium in 1953, as well as using other names. Several appearances followed, including performances with singer Billy Daniels and pianist Benny Payne (New Wimbledon Theatre, 26 July 1953).

Kaye performed in the Kurhaus at Scheveningen in the Netherlands in 1953. That same year, "Cab's Secret" hot sauce was sold in shops on Archer Street (East Finchley) in London. Although popular among Kaye's friends for many years, the sauce failed commercially. At the end of 1953, he formed the cabaret act The Two Brown Birds of Rhythm with Josie Woods. At the Ring Side club in Paris as "Kab Kay" he accompanied Eartha Kitt on piano. In April 1954, he played the role of "Kenneth – the coloured singer" in the film The Man Who Loved Redheads. Kaye received a salary of £35 per day.

During one of his tours of England (20 September 1954), he sang with a band led by pianist Ken Moule and including Dave Usden (trumpet), Keith Barr, Roy Sidwell (tenor saxophone), Don Cooper (bass), Arthur Watts (bass). and Lennie Breslaw (drums). Contracted by impresario Lou van Rees, he toured the Netherlands in 1955–1956 and performed at the Flying Dutchman club in Scheveningen. Van Rees had the idea to form a big band with twelve band leaders who were rarely heard on Dutch radio, including Wil Hensbergen, Max Woiski Sr., vibraphonist Eddy Sanchez, Johnny Kraaykamp, and Wessel Ilcken

Also in 1956, Kaye played at the Sheherazade jazz club in Amsterdam's with his All Star Quintet consisting of Rob Pronk (piano), Toon van Vliet (tenor sax), Dub Dubois (bass) and drummer Wally Bishop. The club, nicknamed "Zade" by friends, was located in the Wagenstraat until 1962 and was a popular meeting place for jazz musicians. Later in 1956 Kaye toured Germany and played in Hamburg, Düsseldorf, and Köln, followed in 1957 by a tour of England with the Eric Delaney Band Show with Marion Williams.

Kaye performed in Cab's Quintet on the British BBC television program Six-Five Special on 31 August 1957 (season 1, episode 29) with Laurence "Laurie" Deniz (1st guitar) and his brother Joe Deniz (guitar), Pete Blannin (bass), and Harry South (piano). Around this time Kaye also performed in Oh Boy!, the first British teenage all-music show. Oh Boy was an ABC show for ITV, produced by Jack Good, who had produced Six-Five Special on which Kaye had appeared. That same year, Kaye was voted eleventh in Melody Maker's Jazz Music Magazine Poll. Kaye appeared again on Six-Five Special on 1 March 1958 (season 1, episode 57).

In 1959, he joined the ensemble of Humphrey Lyttelton in London, which led to the recording of the album Humph Meets Cab (March 1960), with his characteristic witty vocals on pieces such as "Let Love Lie Sleeping".

The Manchester Evening News announced on 25 August 1960 that the next day's BBC TV Jazz Session was to feature the Dill Quintet, the Bob Wallis Storyville Jazzmen, and singer Cab Kaye. In the same year, Kaye came ninth in Melody Maker's Jazz Poll.

== Swinging diplomat ==
On 6 March 1957, the Gold Coast became Ghana, the first sub-Saharan African country to gain its independence. Three years later, on 6 March 1960, Kwame Nkrumah became president of the republic. For Cab Kaye, Ghana's independence was an important political symbol. Two family members in high government positions, Tawia Adamafio and C. T. Nylander, had brought Kaye into contact with Ghanaian politics. During Nkrumah's reign, Kaye was appointed Government Entertainments Officer. Beginning in 1961, he worked at the Ghana High Commission in London as protocol officer. He played a role in getting a Ghanaian passport for Miriam Makeba, whose South African passport had been revoked under the country's apartheid regime.

He discarded the Anglicized version of his name and called himself "Kwamlah Quaye", though some newspapers missed the "h". During the day he worked in the Ghanaian High Commission and at night in Ronnie Scott's Jazz Club. A farewell special, Swinging Diplomat, was broadcast by the BBC in August 1961. A farewell party was organized in Ronnie Scott's club.

Before leaving for Ghana, Kaye and his Kwamlah Quaye Sextetto Africana recorded "Everything Is Go", the song he had written with William "Bill" Davis. With this band he made the first recordings in which he played guitar. This group consisted of Laurence Deniz, born in Cardiff in 1924 to a father from Cape Verde; Chris O'Brien, bongos, and Frank Holder, both from British Guiana (now Guyana) and served in the Royal Air Force (RAF); and Chris Ajilo on claves. "Everything Is Go" was a calypso tribute to American astronaut John Glenn. On 17 February 1962 Kaye received fourth place in the Melody Maker poll of jazz musicians. He left London with plans to work for the Ghanaian Industrial Development Corporation (IDC). On arriving in Accra, he formed a duo with singer Mary Hyde, with whom he regularly performed in the Star and other hotels in Accra.

Kaye performed during a visit by Queen Elizabeth II to Ghana in November 1961. As Entertainments Manager for Ghana Hotels, Kaye was less successful. Although the concerts he organized were popular, the dance competitions were less so. At the Star Hotel in 1963, he joined drummer Guy Warren (later known as "Kofi Ghanaba") and folk singer Pete Seeger who was on a world tour and popular in Ghana. Kaye played in Accra (including the Tip-Toe Gardens) and in Lagos, alternating with performances in New York (at the Village Door in Long Island). On 7 August 1964, he played with Dizzy Gillespie and his quintet in the charity program O'Pataki to support African culture.

== Politics ==
In the early 1960s the Ghanaian Ramblers Dance Band covered Kaye's highlife song "Beautiful Ghana" under the title "Work and Happiness". The song was released by Decca (West Africa) frequently played during Kwame Nkrumah's regime as part of the "Work and Happiness" political program.

Nkrumah was deposed in 1966 after a military coup, leaving Kaye and other supporters of the previous regime in a difficult situation. He had to explain his political views behind the "Work and Happiness" song. His sister Norma was married to J. T. Nelson-Cole in Nigeria and offered Kaye a home base in Lagos. This was the end of Kaye's political career, but the Pan-Africanism of Kwame Nkrumah, calling for a politically united Africa, remained one of the few political ideals he supported for the rest of his life.

Beginning in 1965 he played in New York, Europe, and Africa. He was announced in New York under the name "Nii Lante Quaye" as a special act, as he was in a flyer announcing Cab Kaye as a guest artist in the show of Ed Nixon Jr. (Nick La Tour) in St. Stephan's Methodist Church, Broadway, on 22 May 1966. The show master Cab Kaye was announced in Ghanaian flyers of this time as "MC" (Master of Ceremony) Cab Kaye. He performed regularly on Ghanaian and Nigerian radio and television: on 16 November 1966 in It's Time for Show Biz with the Spree City Stompers from Berlin; on 6 January 1967 with "the Paramount Eight Dance Band" on Ghanaian television's Bandstand; and on 30 July 1967 as MC at the international pop festival in Accra. In May 1968, he performed with his nephews, the Nelson Cole brothers, in Lagos, and then touring through Nigeria. The Nelson Cole brothers were his sister Norma's sons, who formed the Soul Assembly with other artists. In 1996 Kaye played again in Lagos at the Federal Palace Hotel in a program including Fela Kuti and highlife bandleader Bobby Benson.

After his return to England in 1970, he discovered that his daughter Terri Quaye (also known as Theresa Naa-Koshie), his eldest son Caleb Quaye and his band Hookfoot, were more popular than he was. He began his second London career in Mike Leroy's Chez Club Cleo in Knightsbridge accompanied by Clive Cooper (bass) and Cecil "Flash" Winston (drums). Kaye became a much-requested presence on the London jazz circuit. His daughter Terri, who started singing with her father and his bebop jazz band as a young girl, accompanied him at some events. Around 1973 he was accompanied by Mike Greaves (drums, percussion), Phil Bates (bass), and Ray Dempsey (guitar). The following year he was one of the attractions at the Black Arts Festival 1974, organized by the Commonwealth Institute in London. He also made regular appearances at the BBC Club (an exclusive club for BBC employees) with Phil Bates and Tony Crombie.

== Amsterdam: Cab Kaye's Jazz Piano Bar ==
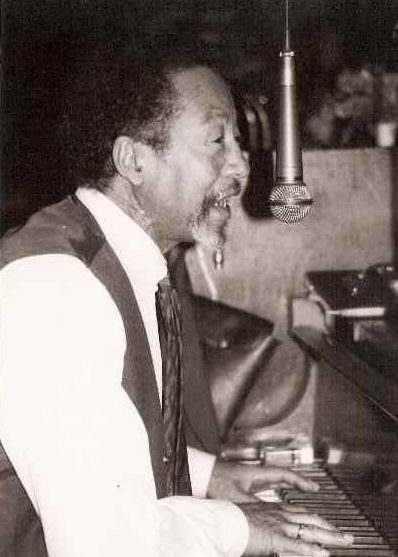
Cab Kaye in his Pianobar in Amsterdam

In the late 1970s, Kaye moved to Amsterdam and became a member of Buma/Stemra, the Dutch copyright organization that oversaw distribution of royalties, and the Dutch Association of Professional Improvising Musicians (BIM). In Amsterdam he performed with jazz musicians such as singer Babs Gonzales, flautist Wally Shorts, trombonist Bert Koppelaar, bassist Wilbur Little, and conductor Boy Edgar (in the Amsterdam Concertgebouw). In the early years in Amsterdam, he rented an apartment from jazz saxophonist Rosa King and became known on the local jazz scene.

He opened Cab Kaye's Jazz Piano Bar in the centre of Amsterdam on 1 October 1979 at Beulingstraat 9, with his Dutch wife Jeannette. When not touring Poland, Portugal, and Iceland, he performed five nights a week in his Piano Bar, a meeting place for jazz musicians. Frequent visitors included Rosa King, Slide Hampton, saxophonist Aart Gisolf, guitarist Dirk-Jan "Bubblin" Toorop, pianist David Mayer, singer Gerrie van der Klei, pianist Cameron Japp, Max Roach, Oscar Peterson, and Pia Beck. Kaye gave many concerts in the Netherlands, including several with Max "Teawhistle" Teeuwisse in Den Oever and four times at the North Sea Jazz Festival. The first North Sea Jazz Festival performance was with his Cab Kaye Quartet on 16 July 1978. The second was on 10 July 1981 with Akwaba Cab Kaye and his Afro Jazz. The third was in July 1982, accompanied by Aart Gisolf and Nippy Noya, and the last was as a soloist on 10 July 1983.

Kaye regularly performed at the Victoria Hotel, Amsterdam, in the second half of the 1980s. On 10 October 1987 he participated in the Night of Hilversum, a polio charity event organized by the Rotary Club, WHO and UNICEF. On 21 May 1988 Cab Kaye's Jazz Piano Bar closed, and he began to be heard in public much less often. His final significant performance was on 8 September 1996 at the Bimhuis in Amsterdam. Many musicians and jazz lovers, including Herman Openneer, Pim Gras, the Dutch jazz drummer John Engels and Rosa King, organized a birthday party for the 75-year-old pianist. He was unable to sing due to his mouth floor cancer but enthusiastically played piano with many musicians. He performed sporadically in smaller venues and privately in Amsterdam's Dapperbuurt. The last time he played piano (including "Jeannette You Are My Love") was on 12 March 2000 at home with Rosa King.

== Private life ==
Although born in London, Kaye considered himself African. He was married three times, first in 1939 to Theresa Austin, a jazz singer and daughter of a sailor from Barbados. He and Theresa often performed together. The couple had two daughters, Terri Quaye (born 8 November 1940, Bodmin), Tanya Quaye, and a son, Caleb Quaye (born 1948, London).

Kaye met his second wife, a Nigerian named Evelyn, in the 1960s in Ghana. They moved back to England. After a brief affair in 1973 with Sharon McGowan, he had a son, Finley Quaye (born 25 March 1974, Edinburgh). Kaye met his son Finley as an adult in 1997 following a concert of Finley's in the rock music venue and cultural centre Paradiso Amsterdam.

Kaye's third wife, Jeannette, was Dutch. After marrying, he settled in the Netherlands and became a Dutch citizen, living in Amsterdam. In the 1990s, he was diagnosed with floor of mouth cancer (oral cancer) and lost the ability to speak properly. He died at the age of 78 on 13 March 2000. He was cremated and his ashes were scattered in the North Sea and in Accra.

== Discography ==
=== As leader ===
- Cab Kaye and His Band, May 1951 (Astraschall)
- Cab Kaye acc. by the Gerry Moore Trio, 1 March 1952 (Esquire)
- Cab Kaye acc. by the Norman Burns Quintet, 17 May 1952 (Esquire)
- Cab Kaye with the Ken Moule Seven, 20 September 1954 (Esquire)
- Cab Kaye Trio, 23 December 1976, Today, (Riff Records, 1977)
- Cab Kaye Trio, 10 July 1981, Cab Kaye Live at the North Sea Jazz Festival 1981 (Philips)
- Cab Kaye live The Key, 20 August 1984 (Keytone)
- Cab Kaye, The Consul of Swing – Victoria Blues, 14 March 1986
- Cab Kaye in Iceland, 18 June 1986 (Icelandic national radio)
- Cab Kaye in Iceland & Africa on Ice, October 1996 (Icelandic national radio)

=== As sideman ===
- Billy Cotton and His Band, 27 August 1936 (Regal Zonophone)
- Billy Cotton & His Orchestra, A Nice Cup of Tea Volume 2, recorded 1936–1941 (Vocalion, 2001)
- Jazz at the Town Hall Ensemble, 30 March 1948 (Esquire)
- Keith Bird and The Esquire Six, 13 October 1949 (Esquire)
- Humphrey Lyttelton Quartet, 15 March 1960, Humph Meets Cab (Columbia)
- Humphrey Lyttelton and His Band, 30 March 1960 (Philips)
- Kwamlah Quaye Sextetto Africana (Melodisc, 1962)
- Kwamlah Quaye Sextetto Africana (Melodisc, 1962)
- Billy Cotton & His Band, Things I Love About the 40s, 16 June 1998
- Ginger Johnson & Friends, London Is the Place for Me, volume 4, 2006 (Honest Jon's)
- Billy Cotton & His Band, Wakey Wakey!, 6 September 2005 (Living Era)
- Humphrey Lyttelton and His Quartet Band featuring Cab Kaye, High Class 1959–60, 24 May 2011
- Kenny Ball's Jazzmen and Cab Kaye and His Quartet (Jazz Club – A BBC Programme, Complete as Broadcast in 1961), 28 September 2013 (DigitalGramophone, 2013)
