= Stars Campaign for Inter-Racial Friendship =

The Stars Campaign for Interracial Friendship or SCIF was set up after the 1958 Notting Hill race riots, by a group of actors, authors, musicians, journalists and television stars.

John Dankworth, whose wife Cleo Laine was also involved in the movement, described the objectives:

Well the objectives of the campaign are largely to counteract any cranky organisations which try to preach the gospel of a master race anywhere [which] seem laughable on the face of it, but they aren't really laughable, because Adolf Hitler started a similar organisation about twenty, twenty-five years ago which caused the deaths of millions and millions of people and the suffering of millions more.

A publication entitled What the Stars Say was distributed to jazz clubs in the west of London.

The ideals of racial tolerance and harmony through the example of those who earn their living in the world of art and entertainment, and in the associated realms of journalism, writing and the productive side of show business. Its aims are: to promote understanding between races and banish ignorance about racial characteristics; to combat instances of social prejudice by verbal and written protests; to set an example to the general public through members personal race relations; and to use all available means to publicise their abhorrence of racial discrimination.

A venue The Harmony Club opened on 19 January 1959 hosted by Josephine Douglas. Members of SCIF Performed at the club, which was open twice a week for six weeks. The club's aim was to allow people from different races and cultures to be able to socialise and dance together despite the prevailing colour bar.

The Murder of Kelso Cochrane in May 1959 provoked a second SCIF publication with a lead article by Frank Sinatra entitled You Can't Hate and be Happy.

After the defeat of Oswald Mosley later in the year, the organisation was dissolved.
