= Blue and Sentimental (album) =

1994 studio album by Cleo Laine

Studio album by Cleo Laine
- Released: 1994
- Recorded: 1994; Clinton Recording Studios, New York City and Studio D Recording Studios, Sausalito, California
- Genre: Vocal jazz
- Label: RCA Victor

Cleo Laine chronology
I Am a Song (1994)	Blue and Sentimental (1994)	Solitude (1995)

Blue and Sentimental is a 1994 studio album by British singer Cleo Laine.

== Track listing ==
1. "The Lies of Handsome Men" (Francesca Blumenthal)
2. "I've Got a Crush on You" (George Gershwin, Ira Gershwin)
3. "Blue and Sentimental" (Count Basie, Mack David, Jerry Livingston)
4. "Afterglow" (Carroll Coates)
5. "Not You Again" (Duncan Lamont)
6. "Primrose Colour Blue" (John Dankworth, Cleo Laine)
7. "What'll I Do?" (Irving Berlin)
8. "Love Me (If It Takes All Night Long)" (Kansas Joe McCoy)
9. "Creole Love Call" (Duke Ellington)
10. "Dreamsville" (Ray Evans, Jay Livingston, Henry Mancini)
11. "A Cryin' Shame" (John Dankworth)
12. "Love Comes and Goes" (Carroll Coates)
13. "Soft Pedal Blues" (Bessie Smith)
