= To Hope! A Celebration =

To Hope! A Celebration is a 1996 live album by the American jazz pianist Dave Brubeck.

The audio CD consists of a recording of a live performance of the Catholic mass as arranged and composed by Brubeck. It is Brubeck's second recording of this piece.

The earlier original vinyl LP 1980 recording (Pastoral Arts Associates (PAA) LP record DRP-8318) of "To Hope! A Celebration By Dave Brubeck (A Mass in the Revised Roman Ritual)" - featuring Dave Brubeck on Piano, Jerry Bergonzi on Tenor Saxophone, Chris Brubeck on Bass Guitar, Randy Jones on Drums, Daisy Newman - Soprano (cantor), Tim Noble - Baritone (cantor), William McGraw - Baritone (priest), The Cincinnati May Festival Chorus (directed by John Leman), The Mt. Washington [Ohio] Presbyterian Church Handbell Choir (directed by Wylene Davies), conducted by Erich Kunzel, recorded in Providence, Rhode Island, has not been re-issued on audio CD.

The later June 12, 1995, recording - released on audio CD by Telarc (Telarc 20 CD-80430), was performed by the Duke Ellington School Of The Arts Show Choir, the Cathedral Choral Society (directed by J. Reilly Lewis) and Orchestra (conducted by Russell Gloyd), at Washington National Cathedral, accompanied by Brubeck and his quartet featuring Bobby Militello on Saxophone.
