= George Tyndale =

Jamaican musician

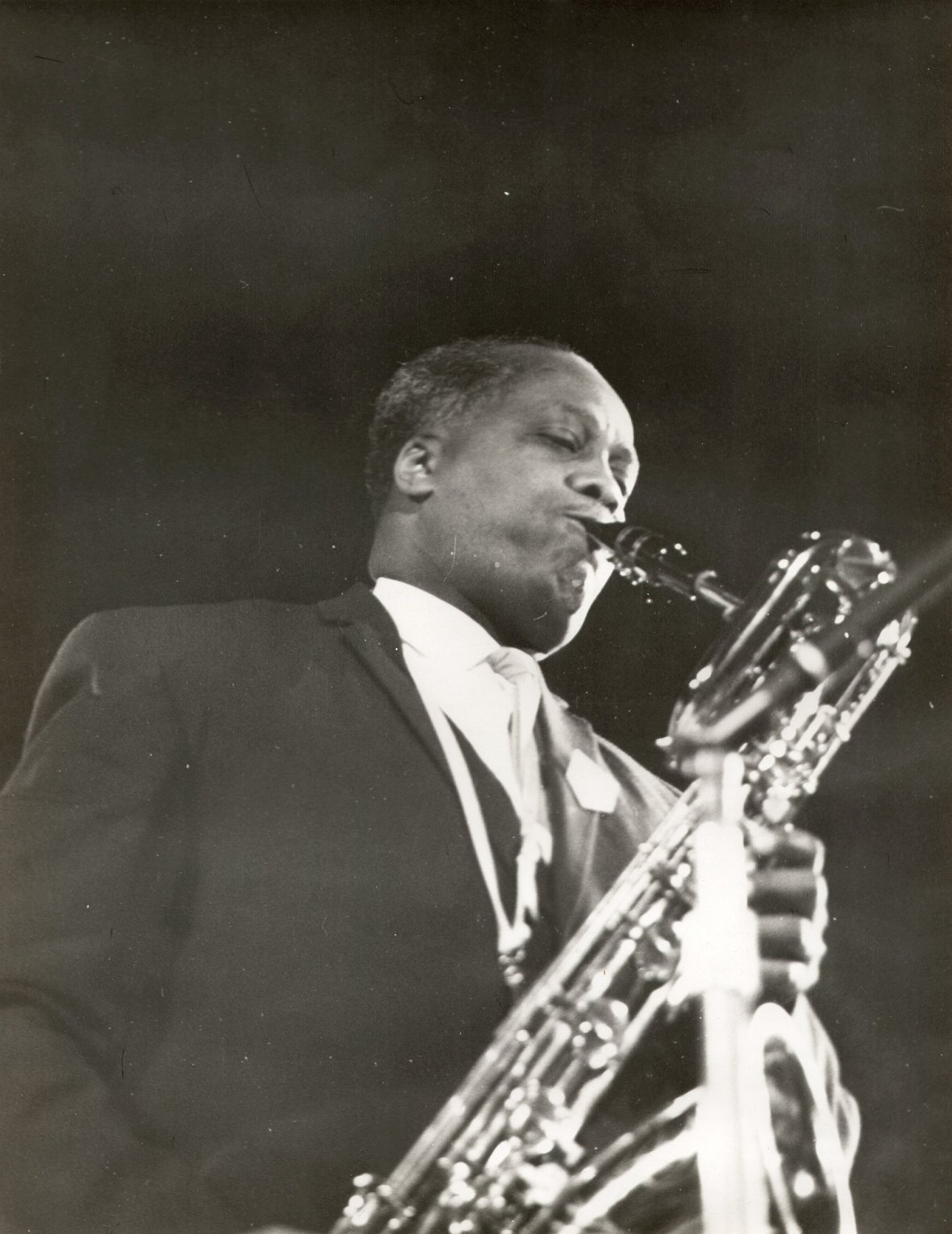
George Tyndale

George Tyndale (Sibornia) [Sky] (15 June 1913 in Manchester, Jamaica – 4 December 1991 in Dorking, England) was a Jamaican tenor saxophonist and clarinetist.

== Early career ==
He started on clarinet and worked in Bermuda and on Canadian cruise ships before taking up saxophone. As a key soloist in the society band of the pianist Milton McPherson, he became a leading tenor saxophonist in Jamaica.

== Move to England ==
In 1945, he moved to England to join Jiver Hutchinson, with whom he remained for five years and made tours of India and Europe. He then worked in Cambridge with the trumpeter Ken Turner. With Cab Kaye he toured Belgium and the Netherlands (1950–51), after which he rejoined Hutchinson to tour Sweden and worked with Joe Harriott.

== Performances ==
An expansive soloist in the style of Ben Webster, Tyndale developed a reputation for reliability as a section player and worked with Ted Heath, Harry Gold, and the Squadronaires. He recorded with Caribbean singers and appeared extensively at nightclubs, in particular with Joe Appleton's band and for a period as a leader at the Sunset, a rendezvous popular with London's black population. Tyndale changed to baritone saxophone on joining John Dankworth’s orchestra in 1960; he then spent several years with semi-professional groups.

== Selected recordings ==
- Jiver Hutchinson: "Cherokee"/"She’s Funny That Way" (1947, Sup.C18167);
- Annie Laurie"/"I Can't Get Started" (1947, Sup. C18167);
- "Exactly Like You"/"Rosetta" (1947, Sup. C18168), Cab Kaye: "Saturday Night Fish Fry"/"School-bop" (1951), 1, Astraschall 4005);
- "Mood Indigo"/"Solitude" (1951, Astraschall 4001);
- Pete Pitterson: "Mango Time" (1951, Esquire 5-053) [ci];
- Ivan Browne: "Little Fly" (1954, London CAY108);
- Rupert Nurse, Lord Kitchener: "Birth of Ghana" (1956, Melodisc 1390);
- "African Waltz" (1960, Col. SEG8137), John Dankworth: "African Waltz", "Moanin’";
- John Dankworth: "The Criminal" (1960, Col. SEG8037)
