= In Their Own Sweet Way =

Studio album by Dave Brubeck
- Released: April 29, 1997
- Recorded: January 1994 in New York City, September 7–8, 1995 at Russian Hall Recording, San Francisco
- Genre: Jazz
- Length: 1:09:04
- Label: Telarc - CD-83355

Dave Brubeck chronology
To Hope! A Celebration (1995)	In Their Own Sweet Way (1997)	The 40th Anniversary Tour of the U.K. (1998)

In Their Own Sweet Way is a 1998 studio album by pianist Dave Brubeck and his quintet. Brubeck was accompanied by his four sons on a recording for the first time.

The album consists of Brubeck's own compositions, with the exception of the final track, "Sweet Georigia Brown". "We Will All Remember Paul" and "My One Bad Habit" were recorded as tributes to Paul Desmond and Ella Fitzgerald respectively. The composition "Bifocal Blues" was originally called "Bitonal Blues" and humorously rechristened in honour of Brubeck's advanced age.

== Reception ==
Professional ratings
Review scores
Source	Rating
Allmusic	4/5 stars
The Penguin Guide to Jazz Recordings	3/4 stars

Richard S. Ginell reviewed the album for Allmusic and wrote that the album "As do most of Dave's Telarc albums, this one has an autumnal tone as the mellowing septuagenarian pianist plays the wise old master, playing in a more lyrical, reflective manner, revisiting past work and contributing a few new tunes. When Dave and Darius play together, Dave still remains the more immediately striking personality while Darius leans more toward mainstream jazz styles. ...Dave Brubeck's Indian summer continues to be an unusually fruitful one".

Ginell praised Darius Brubeck on "Dave 'n Darius", a duet with his father, and highlighted Dan Brubeck's "...cooking New Orleans funk (in 7/4 time!)" on "Sweet Georgia Brown."

== Track listing ==
All compositions by Dave Brubeck unless otherwise noted

1. "In Your Own Sweet Way" – 6:34
2. "Bifocal Blues" – 6:49
3. "Sermon on the Mount" – 7:53
4. "Michael, My Second Son" – 4:21
5. "Ode to a Cowboy" – 7:58
6. "Dave 'N Darius" – 6:48
7. "We Will Remember Paul" – 5:57
8. "Sixth Sense" – 7:32
9. "My One Bad Habit" (Dave Brubeck, Iola Brubeck) – 8:26
10. "Sweet Georgia Brown" (Ben Bernie, Kenneth Casey, Maceo Pinkard) – 6:46

== Personnel ==
- Dave Brubeck - piano
- Matthew Brubeck - cello
- Darius Brubeck - electric piano
- Chris Brubeck - electric bass, bass trombone
- Dan Brubeck - drums

Production

- Bruce Leek, Jack Renner - engineer
