= Paper Moon (album) =

Studio album by The Dave Brubeck Quartet
- Released: 1982
- Recorded: September 1981 at Coast Recorders, San Francisco, California, USA
- Genres: Cool jazz, West Coast jazz
- Length: 41:50 (international edition)
- Label: Concord Jazz
- Producer: Russell Gloyd

The Dave Brubeck Quartet chronology
Tritonis (1980)	Paper Moon (1982)	In Montreux, 1982 (1982)

Professional ratings
Review scores
Source	Rating
AllMusic	4.5/5 stars
The Penguin Guide to Jazz Recordings	3/4 stars

Paper Moon was recorded by the Dave Brubeck Quartet at Coast Recorders in San Francisco, California. The record was released in September 1981 by Concord Jazz, a subsidiary of Concord Records. It was produced by Russell Gloyd and engineered by Ron Davis and Phil Edwards. On this recording, pianist Dave Brubeck is accompanied by his son Chris Brubeck on the bass and bass trombone, with Jerry Bergonzi on tenor sax and Randy Jones on the drums. Paper Moon is Brubeck's third of three Concord recordings featuring this permutation of the Dave Brubeck Quartet; jazz commentator Scott Yanow referred to the album as the "most rewarding of the trio".

== Analysis ==
Stylistically, Paper Moon is typical Dave Brubeck cool jazz, varying only slightly from past Brubeck recordings. The tracks on this album are less hurried than those on Time Out, Brubeck's most well-known recording. The record is characterized by its flowing bass and drums providing a steady accompaniment.

=== "It's Only a Paper Moon" ===
The title track, "It’s Only a Paper Moon", begins with Dave Brubeck's piano, backed by the drummer's fast but light rhythm and the bassist's syncopated plucking. About forty seconds into the track the piano switches to stride style, and at 0:52 the saxophone enters on an improvised solo as Dave Brubeck comps. At 2:38 Dave Brubeck begins his piano solo using block chords. His solo continues until 3:31 when bass player Chris Brubeck, now on bass trombone, takes over. His improvisation dips into the lowest registers, giving the piece a fuller and rougher tone. His solo ends the piece with a repeat of the chorus.

== Track listing ==
1. "Music, Maestro, Please!" (Herbert Magidson, Allie Wrubel) – 8:58
2. "I Hear a Rhapsody" (Jack Baker, George Fragos, Dick Gasparre) – 6:06
3. "Symphony" (Alex Alstone) – 5:10
4. "I Thought About You" (Johnny Mercer, Jimmy Van Heusen) – 5:21
5. "It's Only a Paper Moon" (Harold Arlen, Yip Harburg, Billy Rose) – 5:34
6. "Long Ago (and Far Away)" (Ira Gershwin, Jerome Kern) – 8:03
7. "St. Louis Blues" (W. C. Handy) – 3:10

== Personnel ==
- Dave Brubeck – piano
- Jerry Bergonzi – tenor saxophone
- Chris Brubeck – bass, bass trombone
- Randy Jones – drums
