= The Crossing (Dave Brubeck album) =

Studio album by Dave Brubeck
- Released: October 23, 2001
- Recorded: September, 9–November 19, 2000 in Cleveland, Ohio
- Genre: Jazz
- Length: 1:02:46
- Label: Telarc - CD-83520
- Producer: Russell Gloyd

Dave Brubeck chronology
Dave Brubeck: Live with the LSO (2000)	The Crossing (2001)	Double Live from the U.S.A. and U.K. (2001)

The Crossing is 2001 studio album by pianist Dave Brubeck and his quartet.

Many of the pieces on the album were dedicated to various people in Brubeck's life. "All My Love" was dedicated to his wife, Iola, "Bessie" for his mother, and "Mariel" to his fourth grandchild. "Randy Jones" was a tribute to Brubeck's longtime drummer, Randy Jones.

== Reception ==
Professional ratings
Review scores
Source	Rating
Allmusic	4/5 stars
The Penguin Guide to Jazz Recordings	3/4 stars

Ken Dryden reviewed the album for Allmusic and wrote that "...Dave Brubeck still has the drive that he had some 40 years earlier, both as a performer and composer. All nine compositions appear on disc for the first time, starting with "The Crossing," Brubeck's lively musical vision of a passenger ship getting underway for a long trip across the ocean, though a ship's engines would burn out if they kept up with the intensity of this piece...Overall, this is yet another memorable release by Dave Brubeck".

Reviewing the album for the Jazz Times, Larry Appelbaum wrote that "Dave Brubeck may well be the Energizer Bunny of the jazz world. At the age of 80 he not only maintains a schedule of touring and recording, but his latest finds him writing challenging new pieces and arrangements...There's an elegance to much of Brubeck's work these days, most notably on "Bessie," named and composed in memory of his mother; "All My Love," written for Iola, his wife of 59 years; and the stately waltz "Hold Fast to Dreams," taken from his suite of vocal settings of Langston Hughes poems." Appelbaum reserved criticism for the title track, which he felt was a "set of changes without melody propelled by a pseudo rock beat. It's impressive, however, to hear Militello take this bit of fluff and really cut loose. Talk about making something out of nothing!".

Dave Nathan reviewed The Crossing for All About Jazz and wrote that "Having performed in each of the last seven decades, Brubeck has passed the greatest and sternest test of all, time. He's here with still another quartet from which he gets the most pleasing, mellifluous stream of musical outpouring. Often criticized and diminished by elitist critics and jealous and mostly not very talented jazzers, he can sit back, smile and say "where are they all now?"...Each one of the nine tracks is Brubeck incarnate, rapturous, rhapsodic and remarkable".

== Track listing ==
All compositions by Dave Brubeck:

1. "The Crossing" – 7:17
2. "Day After Day" – 6:45
3. "Mariel" – 8:24
4. "All My Love" – 4:59
5. "¿Por Que No? (Why Not?)" – 5:13
6. "Chasin' Yourself" – 6:59
7. "Bessie" – 7:57
8. "Randy Jones" – 7:29
9. "Hold Fast to Dreams" – 7:43

== Personnel ==
- Dave Brubeck - piano
- Bobby Militello - alto saxophone, flute
- Alec Dankworth - double bass
- Randy Jones - drums

Production

- A. M. Cassandre - cover painting
- Ken Dryden - engineer
- Bob Blumenthal - liner notes
- Russell Gloyd - producer, liner notes
