= Terri Quaye =

English singer, pianist, songwriter and percussionist (born 1940)

- Also known as: Naa-Koshie
- Born: Theresa Quaye; 8 November 1940 (age 85); Bodmin, Cornwall, England
- Education: University of London
- Genre: Jazz
- Occupations: Singer, pianist, songwriter and percussionist
- Instruments: Singing, piano
- Labels
- Father: Cab Kaye
- Relatives: Caleb Quaye; Finley Quaye (half-brother)
- Website: www.terriquaye.com

Terri Quaye, also Theresa Quaye (born 8 November 1940, Bodmin, England), is an English singer, pianist, songwriter and percussionist. She is the daughter of Cab Kaye, older sister of Caleb Quaye and half-sister of Finley Quaye.

Her first professional experience came in 1958, singing with a Latin jazz band led by Ido Martin. She sang accompanied by Colin Purbrook, Leon Cohen, and Brian Lemon, then did a residency with Frank Holder. In Germany, she worked in the group The Merrymakers as a conga player and singer, and played with Carmell Jones, Dave Pike, and Leo Wright. After a trip to Ghana, the birthplace of her grandfather, musician Caleb Quaye (1895–1922), she received her Ga name: Naa-Koshie.

In the 1970s, she worked with Manu Dibango, Syvilla Fort, Harold Mabern, Junie Booth, Richard Davis, Billy Higgins, Archie Shepp, Dudu Pukwana, John Stevens, Trevor Watts, Dr. John, and Art "Shaki" Lewis.

She became more active as an educator and ethnomusicologist in the 1980s, at the Museum of African Art, Smithsonian Institution, Washington, DC, United States, and 1990s, gaining her master's degree in ethnomusicology in 1988 from the University of London. She has also exhibited as an ethnographic photographer. Maplin Art Gallery have her work in their permanent collection. She has done mostly solo piano/vocal work in the 1990s, and opened her own bar in London, Jazzers, 1996–99.

She is now active within the Unitarian church as a lay preacher. Well known as a percussionist in the 1970s and '80s, she now performs as a pianist and vocalist covering jazz standards. She is based on the South Coast of England and recent performances have included the 2022 Swanage Jazz Festival.
