= Jacqui Dankworth =

British jazz singer (born 1963)

- Born: 5 February 1963 (age 63); Northampton, Northamptonshire, England
- Genre: British jazz singer
- Occupation: Singer
- Labels: Candid, Audacious Music, Specific Jazz
- Spouse: Charlie Wood
- Website: www.jacquidankworth.com

Jacqueline Caryl Dankworth MBE (born 5 February 1963) is a British jazz singer. She is the daughter of jazz singer Cleo Laine and musician John Dankworth.

== Career ==
Dankworth was born in Northampton, Northamptonshire, England. She attended St. Christopher School in Hertfordshire and is an alumna and fellow of Guildhall School of Music & Drama. She worked as an actress with the Royal Shakespeare Company, the Royal National Theatre, and in West End theatre. She played Cinderella in the musical Into the Woods and appeared in the film Shoreditch, singing the song "My Man" by Billie Holiday.

In 2003, Dankworth released her first album, As the Sun Shines Down on Me on Candid Records. This album brought her to the attention of Michael Parkinson and BBC Radio 2, and she appeared regularly on air throughout that year. She featured on Courtney Pine's album Devotion, and performed with Pine at the Royal Festival Hall as part of the London Jazz Festival. Dankworth followed the success of As the Sun Shines Down on Me with the 2004 release, Detour Ahead. Her third album, Back to You was released in 2009.

She was appointed Member of the Order of the British Empire (MBE) in the 2019 Birthday Honours for services to music.

Dankworth is married to Charlie Wood, a blues keyboardist and vocalist from Memphis, United States.

== Discography ==
- First Cry with Anthony Kerr (EFZ, 1994)
- New Perspectives Perform Five Housman Settings and Other Jazz Works (Spotlite, 1996) – as the vocalist with the 12-piece ensemble of jazz players and classical musicians from English Serenata. Five composers set A. E. Housman's poetry to jazz: John Dankworth, Patrick Gowers, Andrea Vicari, John C. Williams, and Dick Walter. It was selected as the outstanding UK jazz release of 1996 by the Sunday Times.
- For All We Know with James Pearson (Black Box, 2000)
- As the Sun Shines Down on Me (Candid, 2001)
- Detour Ahead (Candid, 2004)
- Back to You (Audacious, 2009)
- It Happens Quietly (Specific Jazz, 2011)
- Live to Love (Specific Jazz, 2013)
