= Randy Jones (drummer) =

British-American drummer (1944–2016)

Background information
- Born: Randall Hodges Jones; January 23, 1944; Slough, Buckinghamshire, England
- Died: June 13, 2016 (aged 72) The Bronx, New York City, United States
- Genres: Jazz
- Years active: 1960–2016
- Formerly of: Chet Baker; Tony Bennett; Dave Brubeck; Billy Eckstine; Maynard Ferguson; Milt Jackson; Cleo Laine; Gerry Mulligan; Bill Watrous

Randall Hodges Jones (January 23, 1944 – June 13, 2016) was a British-born American jazz drummer.

== Biography ==
Born in Slough, Buckinghamshire, (now Berkshire), Jones was a versatile musician capable of driving a big band, but could also play quite well with smaller units. He started playing professionally when he was 16, touring Germany with an English rock and roll group. In between, he backed up rock and pop artists in television variety shows, while performing on stage or recording in studio.

In 1969, Jones worked with Maynard Ferguson, when Ferguson signed with CBS Records in England and formed a brawny horns and rhythm ensemble with British musicians that performed the then popular jazz/rock fusion style. During the six years that Jones spent with Ferguson, he performed on the classic album series M.F. Horn (1970), M.F. Horn Two (1972), M.F. Horn 3 (1973), and M.F. Horn 4&5: Live At Jimmy's.

Jones moved to the United States in 1972 and based in New York City. He was soon recognized for his work with singing stars such as Tony Bennett, Billy Eckstine and Cleo Laine, as well as for noted instrumentalists like Chet Baker, Milt Jackson, Gerry Mulligan and Bill Watrous.

In 1980, Jones was invited to join the Dave Brubeck Quartet - replacing drummer Charles J. Thorton "Butch Miles," Jr., beginning an association which lasted until the death of Brubeck in 2012. In this period, Jones toured with the quartet throughout the United States, Canada, Europe and Japan, appearing with them on stage and numerous TV shows, while recording several albums for labels as Concord, EMI and Telarc.

In his private life, Jones was an avid collector of classical music records, and his drum solos reflected that interest dynamically, weaving intricate patterns in the Brubeck Quartet's complex time signatures. Some of his most significant records with the quartet includes Tritonis (1980), Paper Moon (1981), So What's New? (1998), The Crossing (2001), Park_Avenue_South (2003) and London Flat, London Sharp (2005), among others.

Jones died in 2016 at the Calvary Hospital in the Bronx at the age of 72, following heart failure.
