= Charlie Wood (musician) =

American musician

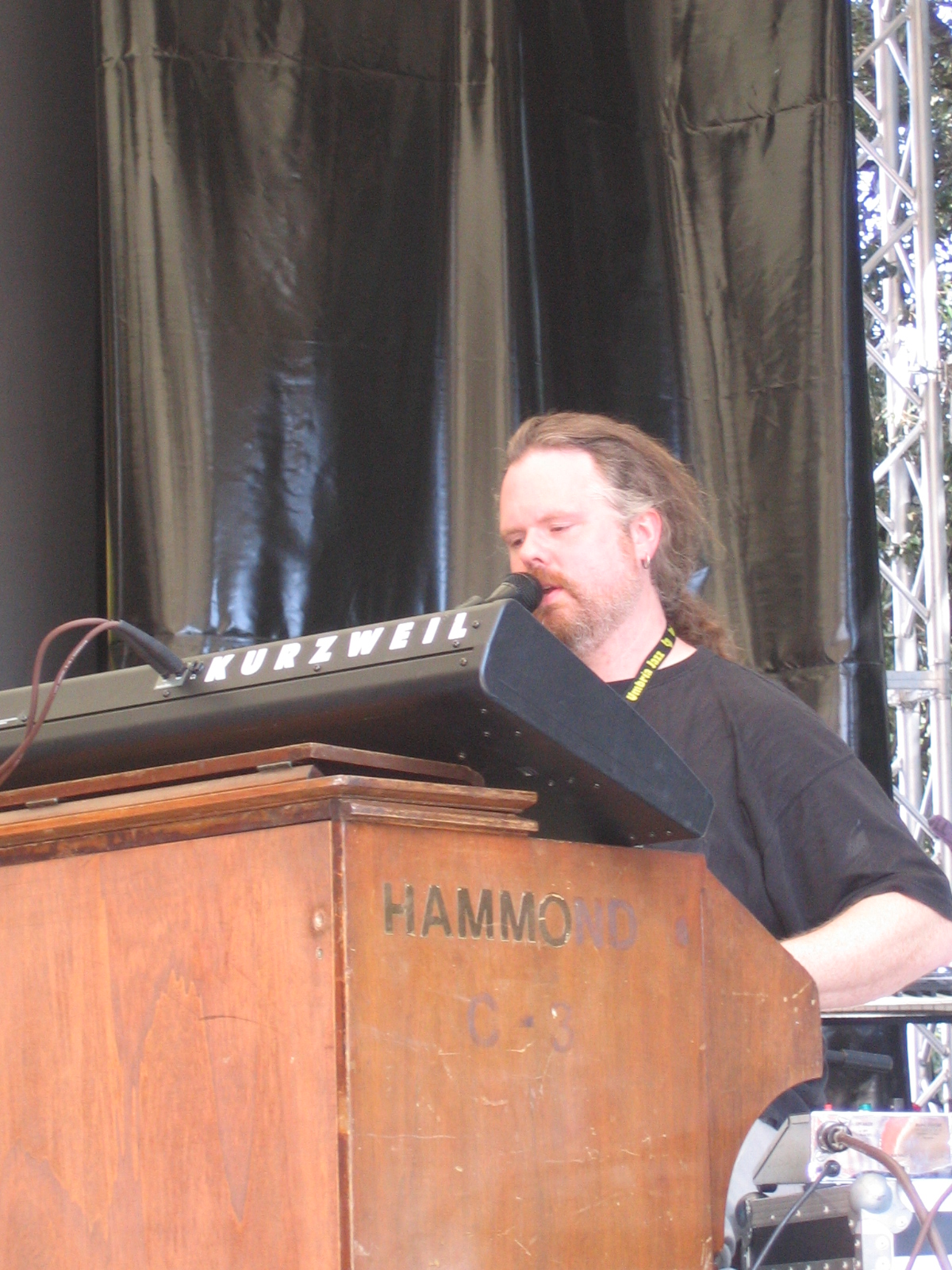
- Wood performing in 2006

Background information
- Instrument: Keyboard
- Label: Archer

Charlie Wood is an American singer, songwriter and keyboardist whose style draws from a wide range of genres including soul, blues, traditional R&B, jazz and popular music.

== Biography ==
Wood’s musical development was first influenced by his hometown of Memphis, Tennessee and then later by New Orleans where, from the age of seventeen, he lived for several years.

In his early twenties, Wood toured the US and Europe as keyboard player for blues guitarist Albert King before returning to Memphis and establishing a residency on the city’s historic Beale Street. This residency lasted for many years, during which time Wood performed with a wide range of musicians including B.B. King, Georgie Fame, Joey DeFrancesco, George Coleman, Mulgrew Miller and Alvin Batiste. Honours received during these years included being awarded the Freedom of the City and a dedicated “Charlie Wood Day” by Memphis City Council, the N.A.R.A.S. “Premier Player Award” for Keyboards and the Beale St. Merchants’ Association Entertainer of the Year” award.

Wood is a prolific recording artist whose first two albums Southbound and Who I Am were released on Ben Sidran's Go Jazz label. These were soon followed by Lucky on Inside Sounds, and Holly-Wood, Somethin' Else and Charlie Wood and the New Memphis Underground on Daddy-O Records. In 2009, Wood signed a multi-album deal with Archer Records ("Flutter and Wow" and "Lush Life") and, since moving to the United Kingdom, he has recorded and released New Souvenirs and Tomorrow Night on Perdido Records.

The majority of Wood's recordings are original compositions which incorporate a wide range of musical styles but primarily soul, blues, jazz and R&B. His lyrics are often characterised by their frankness, wit, wordplay and autobiographical nature. Irma Thomas's recording of one of Wood’s songs, "Never Gonna Stop New Orleans", featured in Harry Shearer’s documentary film. The Big Uneasy. In 2015, Wood's composition “Promised Land” won first prize in the Jazz Category of the USA Songwriting Competition.

In October 2014, Wood became the 136th recipient of a Brass Note on Memphis’s Beale Street.

Wood is now based in Britain and is married to the British jazz singer Jacqui Dankworth.

== Discography ==
- Southbound (Go Jazz 1997)
- Who I Am (Go Jazz 2002)
- Holly-Wood (Daddy-O Records 2004)
- Somethin' Else (Daddy-O Records 2005)
- Lucky (Inside Sounds 2006)
- Charlie Wood and the New Memphis Underground (Daddy-O Records 2007)
- The Memphis Hang (with Jim Shearer) (Summit Records 2008)
- Flutter and Wow (Archer Records 2009)
- Lush Life (Archer Records 2012)
- New Souvenirs (Perdido Records 2014)
- Just You, Just Me (with Jacqui Dankworth) (Perdido Records 2016)
- Tomorrow Night (Perdido Records 2018)
- Your Love Is My Home (Stunt Records, 2026) with Robin Aspland (piano); Daniel Franck (bass); Laurence Cottle (bass); Ian Thomas (drums); Cornelia Nilsson (drums; Áyoe Angelica & Sophie Ziedoy (choir)
