= Park Avenue South (album) =

Live album by Dave Brubeck
- Released: March 25, 2003
- Recorded: July 10–11, 2002
- Venue: Starbucks at 29th and Park Avenue South, Manhattan, New York City
- Genre: Jazz
- Length: 1:11:24
- Label: Telarc
- Producer: Russell Gloyd

Dave Brubeck chronology
Brubeck in Chattanooga (2003)	Park Avenue South (2003)	Brubeck meets Bach (2004)

Park Avenue South is 2003 live album by pianist Dave Brubeck and his quartet. The album was recorded over two nights in a branch of Starbucks in Manhattan.

== Reception ==
Professional ratings
Review scores
Source	Rating
Allmusic	4.5/5 stars
The Penguin Guide to Jazz Recordings	4/4 stars

Ken Dryden reviewed the album for Allmusic and wrote that "The musicians seem very stimulated by the odd surroundings, producing an enticing mix of standards, new Brubeck compositions, and the inevitable "Take Five"...Brubeck wrote the mournful "Elegy" for Norwegian journalist Randi Hultin, who died of cancer before she was able to hear it. The combination of Militello's haunting flute, Michael Moore's matchless arco bass, Randy Jones' soft use of mallets, and the leader's understated piano is powerful enough to hush any audience".

Reviewing the album for the Jazz Times, Doug Ramsey wrote that "We don't know whether Brubeck used his frequent tactic of stimulating his colleagues by launching into standards they don't expect, but freshness and spontaneity of surprise nonetheless saturate...Freshness is Brubeck's stock in trade as he progresses through his ninth decade".

== Track listing ==
1. "On the Sunny Side of the Street" (Dorothy Fields, Jimmy McHugh) – 7:44
2. "Love for Sale" (Cole Porter) – 8:36
3. "Elegy" (Dave Brubeck) – 4:54
4. "Don't Forget Me" (Brubeck) – 11:01
5. "Love Is Just Around the Corner" (Lewis E. Gensler, Leo Robin) – 8:17
6. "On a Slow Boat to China" (Frank Loesser) – 4:46
7. "I Love Vienna" (Brubeck) – 6:41
8. "Crescent City Stomp" (Brubeck) – 6:14
9. "Take Five" (Paul Desmond) – 6:54
10. "Show Me the Way to Go Home" (Irving King) – 6:17

== Personnel ==
- Dave Brubeck – piano, liner notes
- Bobby Militello – alto saxophone, flute
- Michael Moore – double bass
- Randy Jones – drums

Production

- Russell Gloyd – producer
- Erica Brenner, Tommy Moore – editing
- Jack Renner – engineer
- Robert Woods – executive producer
- Robert Friedrich – mixing
- Steve Mazur, James Yates – technical assistance
