= Alec Dankworth =

English jazz bassist and composer (born 1960)

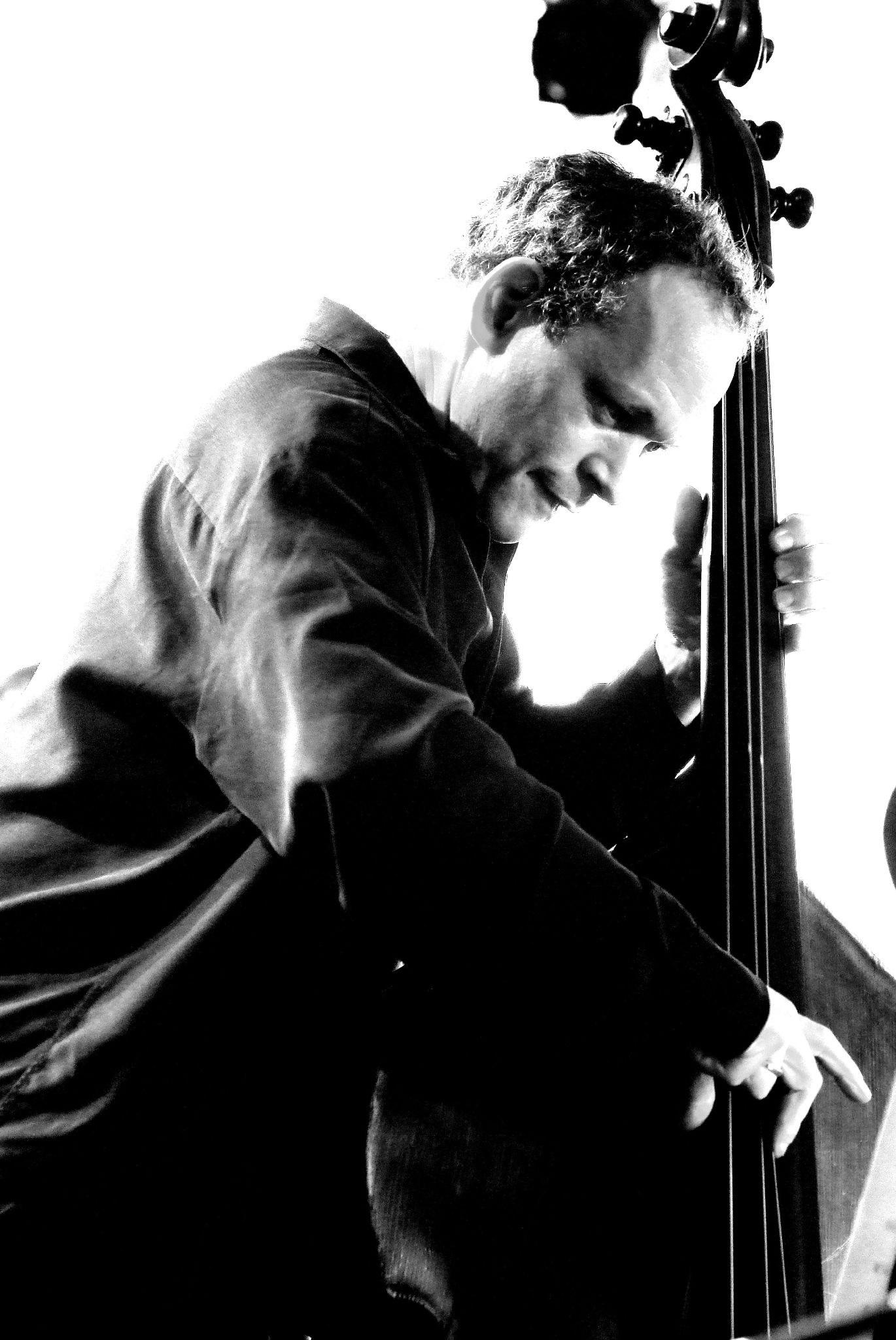
- Dankworth in 2007

Background information
- Born: Alexander William Tamba Dankworth; 14 May 1960 (age 66); Marylebone, London, England
- Instrument: Double bass
- Years active: 1980s–present
- Website: alecdankworth.com

Alexander William Tamba Dankworth (born 14 May 1960) is an English jazz bassist and composer.

== Early life and education ==
Born in London, the son of John Dankworth and Cleo Laine, Alec Dankworth grew up in the villages of Aspley Guise and Wavendon, living at the Old Rectory, Wavendon, where his parents established the Wavendon All-Music Plan (WAP) that includes the Stables Theatre. After attending Bedford School, he studied at the Berklee College of Music in Boston, U.S. in 1978, before joining his parents' quintet.

== Biography ==
Between 1980 and 1983 he toured the United States, Australia, and Europe with them, going on to work with Tommy Chase, the BBC Big Band, and Clark Tracey, with whom he recorded two albums.

Dankworth recorded an arrangement of Duke Ellington's Black, Brown, and Beige with violinist Nigel Kennedy in 1986, with whom he also performed Antonio Vivaldi's The Four Seasons. He also played in the 1980s with Dick Morrissey, Spike Robinson, Jean Toussaint, Michael Garrick, Tommy Smith, Julian Joseph, and Andy Hamilton, as well as leading his own quartet.

In 1990 he was invited to join and tour with Dave Brubeck's band, and in 1993 he worked with Abdullah Ibrahim, touring Europe and South Africa. He has played with Mose Allison, Clark Terry, Mel Tormé, Anita O'Day, Peter King, Alan Barnes, David-Jean Baptiste, Van Morrison and Martin Taylor, among others. He also co-led a 14-piece band with his father, John Dankworth: the Alec and John Dankworth Generation Band (or "Generation Band"), with which he has recorded two albums.

In 2013 Dankworth toured with the Ginger Baker Jazz Confusion, a quartet comprising Dankworth on bass, drummer Ginger Baker, saxophonist Pee Wee Ellis and percussionist Abass Dodoo. Dankworth is also a tutor for the National Youth Jazz Collective.

== Discography ==
=== As co-leader ===
With John Dankworth

- Nebuchadnezzar (Ronnie Scott's Jazz House, 1994)
- Rhythm Changes (Ronnie Scott's Jazz House, 1996)

=== As sideman ===
With Dave Brubeck

- The 40th Anniversary Tour of the U.K. (Telarc, 1999)
- Dave Brubeck: Live with the LSO (Telarc, 2000)
- The Crossing (Telarc, 2001)
- Double Live from the U.S.A. and U.K. (Telarc, 2001)
