= London Flat, London Sharp =

Studio album by Dave Brubeck
- Released: 2005
- Recorded: January 2004
- Genre: Jazz
- Length: 58:23
- Label: Telarc

London Flat, London Sharp is an album by Dave Brubeck. It was recorded in 2004 and contains quartet performances of new and previously recorded pieces, most of which were written by Brubeck.

== Recording and music ==
The album was recorded in January 2004. In addition to Brubeck on piano, the musicians were Bobby Militello on alto saxophone, Michael Moore on bass, and Randy Jones on drums. Militello plays flute on "Steps to Peace".

The material is a mix of old and new compositions, most of them written by Brubeck. For the title track, "Brubeck's left hand moves chromatically down the scale in flats as his right simultaneously moves up in sharps at a brisk tempo". "To Sit and Dream" is taken from "Hold Fast to Dreams", a Brubeck composition based on the poems of Langston Hughes. "Ballad of the Rhine" dates back to the 1940s, when Brubeck was in the military.

== Release and reception ==
Professional ratings
Review scores
| Source | Rating |
|---|---|
| AllMusic | 4.5/5 stars |
| The Penguin Guide to Jazz | 4/4 stars |

London Flat, London Sharp was released by Telarc. The AllMusic reviewer wrote that the album was "yet another superb CD by the prolific and ageless Dave Brubeck". The Penguin Guide to Jazz praised the daring of the title track, and commented that "Militello plays one of his best solos on a Brubeck disc".

== Track listing ==
All tracks composed by Dave Brubeck; except where noted.

1. "London Flat, London Sharp" – 4:26
2. "To Sit and Dream" – 5:05
3. "The Time of Our Madness" – 7:27
4. "Unisphere" – 7:00
5. "Steps to Peace" (Derrill Bodley) – 3:22
6. "Forty Days" – 6:21
7. "Cassandra" – 4:16
8. "Yes, We All Have Our Cross To Bear" (Dave Brubeck, Nancy Wade) – 8:00
9. "Mr. Fats" – 7:59
10. "Ballad of The Rhine" – 3:53

== Personnel ==
=== Musicians ===
- Dave Brubeck – piano
- Bobby Militello – alto sax, flute
- Michael Moore – bass
- Randy Jones – drums

=== Production ===
- Russell Gloyd – recording producer
- Jack Renner – recording engineer
- Paul Blakemore – editing, mixing, mastering
