= So What's New? (Dave Brubeck album) =

Studio album by Dave Brubeck
- Released: April 28, 1998
- Genre: Jazz
- Length: 56:57
- Label: Telarc
- Producer: Russell Gloyd, John Snyder

Dave Brubeck chronology
The 40th Anniversary Tour of the U.K. (1998)	So What's New? (1998)	One Alone (2000)

So What's New? is a 1998 studio album by pianist Dave Brubeck and his quartet.

== Reception ==
Professional ratings
Review scores
Source	Rating
Allmusic	4/5 stars
The Penguin Guide to Jazz Recordings	3.5/4 stars

Richard S. Ginell reviewed the album for Allmusic and wrote that the album "...finds Brubeck in a friskier mood than in his previous, somewhat autumnal Telarcs, even willing to take us back to the bombs-away block-chorded Brubeck of the '50s and '60s on "It's Deja-Vu All Over Again." As an improvising pianist, he continues to be on his toes, sometimes falling back upon patented devices like those wide-screen moving tremolos, yet always finding interesting paths to develop". Ginnell felt that "...very few of his themes or conceptions stay in the mind" with the exception of "Marian McPartland" and "Waltzing", concluding that "Though not his best, So What's New is ample testimony to Brubeck's vitality in his Indian summer".

== Track listing ==
All compositions by Dave Brubeck

1. "It's Deja Vu All Over Again" – 4:51
2. "Fourth of July" – 5:16
3. "The Things You Never Remember" – 8:00
4. "Marian McPartland" – 4:44
5. "Brotherly Love" – 6:37
6. "I'm Still In Love with a Girl Named Oli" – 5:15
7. "Her Name is Nancy" – 2:38
8. "Chorale" – 5:37
9. "Sahra" – 4:12
10. "Waltzing" – 7:17
11. "Five For Ten Small Fingers" – 3:00

== Personnel ==
- Dave Brubeck - piano
- Bobby Militello - alto saxophone
- Jack Six - double bass
- Randy Jones - drums

Production

- Michael Bishop - engineer
- Russell Gloyd, John Snyder - producer
