= Tritonis =

Studio album by Dave Brubeck Quartet
- Released: 31 August 1980
- Recorded: 10–11 March 1980
- Genre: Jazz
- Length: 37:52
- Label: Concord Jazz
- Producer: Russell Gloyd, Dave Brubeck, Chris Brubeck

Dave Brubeck Quartet chronology
Back Home (1979)	Tritonis (1980)	Paper Moon (1981)

Professional ratings
Review scores
Source	Rating
Allmusic	4/5 stars
The Penguin Guide to Jazz Recordings	3/4 stars

Tritonis is a 1980 album by the Dave Brubeck Quartet.

== Track listing ==
1. "Brother, Can You Spare a Dime?" (Music: Jay Gorney/Lyrics: Edgar Yipsel "Yip" Harburg - Arr: Dave Brubeck) – 7:08
2. "Like Someone in Love" (Music: Edward Chester "Jimmy Van Heusen" Babcock/Lyrics: John "Johnny" Burke) – 5:39
3. "Theme for June" (Howard Brubeck) – 7:27
4. "Lord, Lord" (Dave Brubeck) – 6:21
5. "Mr. Fats" (Dave Brubeck) – 3:12
6. "Tritonis" (Dave Brubeck) – 8:05

== Personnel ==
- Dave Brubeck – piano
- Jerry Bergonzi – tenor saxophone, clarinet, electric bass guitar
- Chris Brubeck – electric bass guitar, bass trombone
- Randy Jones – drums
