= The 40th Anniversary Tour of the U.K. =

Live album by Dave Brubeck
- Released: June 22, 1999
- Recorded: November 10–12, 1998
- Genre: Jazz
- Length: 1:10:50
- Label: Telarc - 83440
- Producer: Russell Gloyd, Robert Woods

Dave Brubeck chronology
| In Their Own Sweet Way (1997) | The 40th Anniversary Tour of the U.K. (1999) | So What's New? (1999) |

The 40th Anniversary Tour of the U.K. is a 1998 live album by Dave Brubeck and his quartet recorded over three consecutive concerts in the United Kingdom, some 40 years after he had first visited the country.

"Goodbye Old Friend" was written by Brubeck in tribute to saxophonist Gerry Mulligan, his friend and collaborator. It was recorded in an empty auditorium before one of the concerts featured on the album.

== Reception ==
Professional ratings
Review scores
| Source | Rating |
|---|---|
| Allmusic | 4/5 stars |
| The Penguin Guide to Jazz Recordings | 3.5/4 stars |

Jim Newsom reviewed the album for Allmusic and wrote that "Brubeck's unmistakable pianism remains as identifiable as ever, comping and soloing with the same energy he undoubtedly had 40 years earlier."

Reviewing the album for the Jazz Times, Patricia Myers wrote that the album "..isn't simply an excursion in nostalgia...After 40 years, Brubeck's creative genius continues his contributions of rhythmic complexity and remarkable improvisation."

Saxophonist Bobby Militello was particularly praised by reviewers. C. Michael Bailey for All About Jazz described his playing as "...ice dry and his phrasing is linear and sensible" and Newsom wrote that he was "...truly the musical star of the show. The highly regarded Militello shows he can roam across the entire spectrum of alto saxophone tonality, employing a light, delicate tone à la Paul Desmond one minute, then bearing down for some gritty, deep-throated improvisations the next."

== Track listing ==
1. "Someday My Prince Will Come" (Frank Churchill, Larry Morey) - 8:01
2. "The Time of Our Madness" (Dave Brubeck) - 9:54
3. "Oh You Can Run (But You Can't Hide)" (Brubeck) - 9:34
4. "In a Shanty in Old Shanty Town" (Jack Little, Ira Schuster, Joe Young) - 7:18
5. "I Got Rhythm" (George Gershwin, Ira Gershwin) - 6:58
6. "Deep Purple" (Peter DeRose, Mitchell Parish) - 8:38
7. "All of Me" (Gerald Marks, Seymour Simons) - 8:29
8. "The Salmon Strikes" (Brubeck) - 8:45
9. "Goodbye Old Friend" (Brubeck) - 3:11

== Personnel ==
- Dave Brubeck - piano, liner notes
- Bobby Militello - baritone saxophone
- Alec Dankworth - double bass
- Randy Jones - drums

Production

- Anilda Carrasquillo - art direction, design
- Tom Macko - back cover, cover illustration
- Mark Robertson-Tessi - editing
- Matt Manasse, Jack Renner - engineer
- Robert Woods - executive producer
- Alyn Shipton - liner notes
- Barbara Pease Renner - piano preparation
- Russell Gloyd - producer
- Erica Brenner - production supervisor
- Michael Hatch, Simon James - technical assistance
