= Bobby Militello =

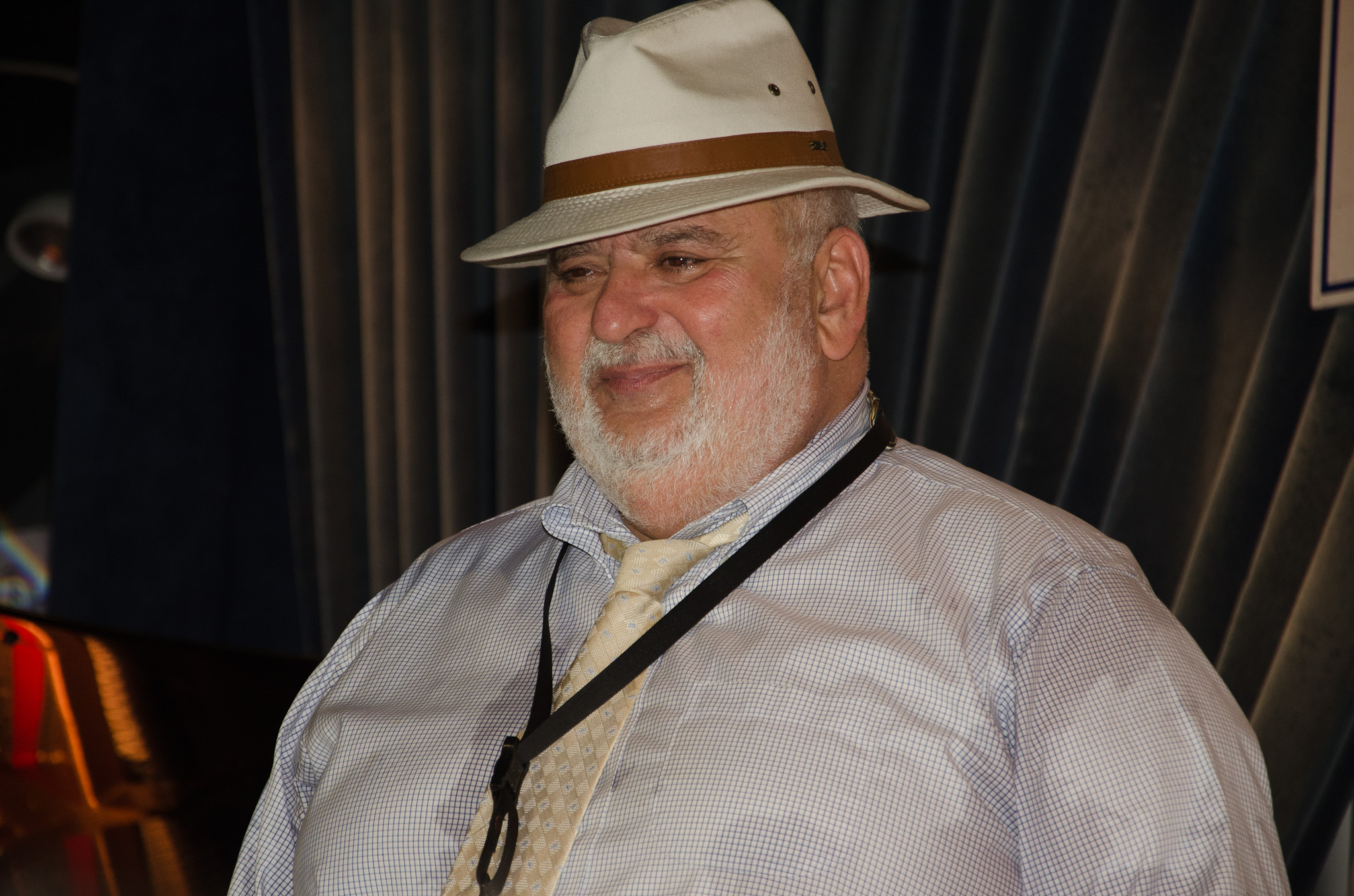
- Bobby Militello at Blue Note Jazz Club

Background information
- Born: Robert Philip Militello; 25 March 1950 (age 76); Buffalo, New York, U.S.
- Genre: Jazz
- Occupation: Musician
- Instruments: Saxophone, flute
- Years active: 1970s–present
- Label: Gordy Records

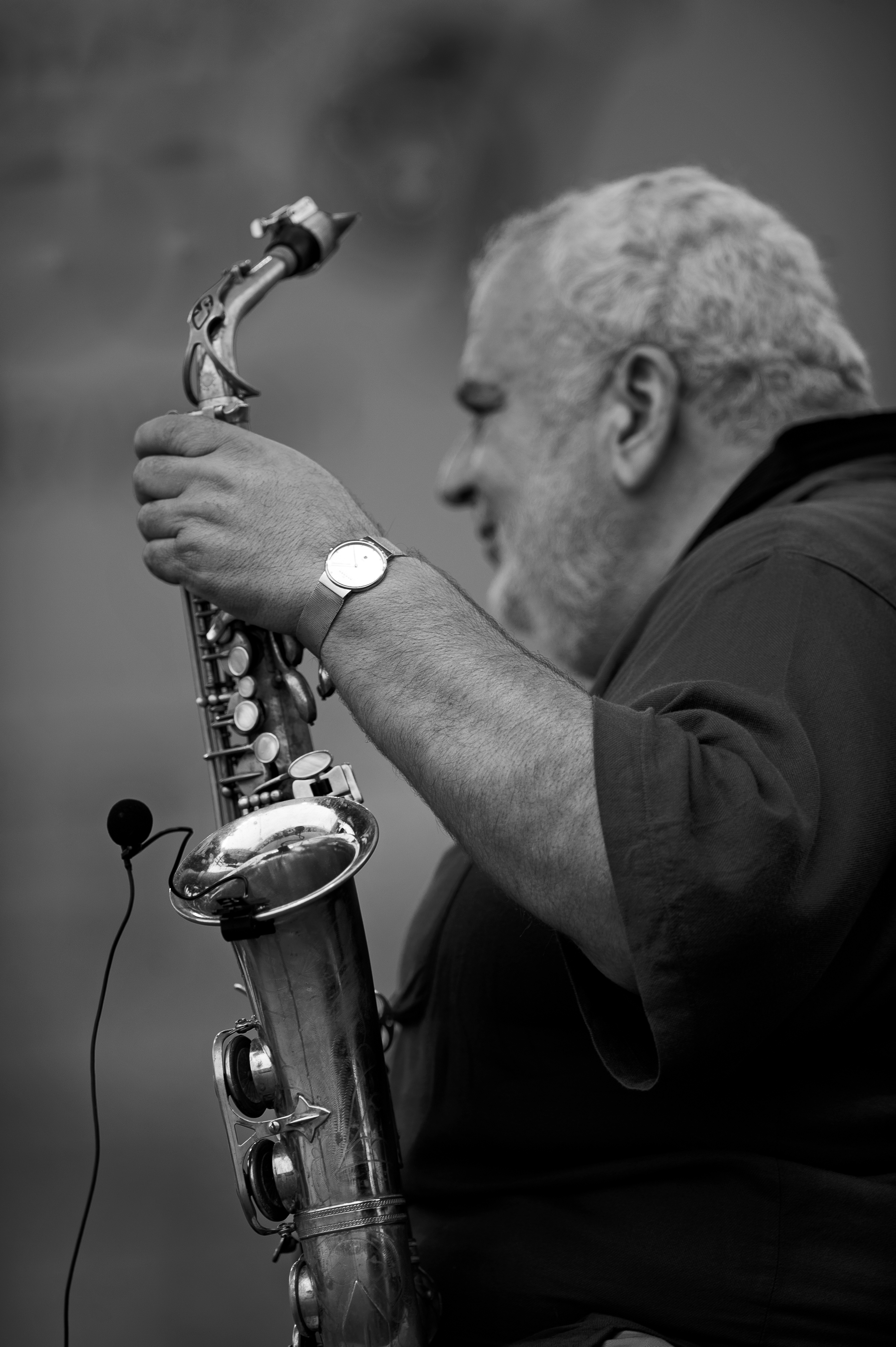

Robert Philip Militello a.k.a. Bobby M. (born March 25, 1950) is an American jazz saxophonist and flautist who was a member of the Dave Brubeck Quartet.

== Career ==
Militello was one of a number of talented musical artists who were mentored by the legendary Sam Scamacca at Buffalo's iconic Lafayette High School in the 1960s. During the 1970s, Militello went on tour with Maynard Ferguson. He returned to Buffalo in the early 1980s and worked as a freelance musician. He moved to Los Angeles and spent the rest of the 1980s and early 1990s as a member of orchestras led by Bill Holman and Bob Florence. He toured and recorded with Dave Brubeck from 1982 to 2012. He leads a quartet that performs concerts dedicated to Brubeck.

== Discography ==
=== As leader ===
- 1982 Blow (Gordy)
- 1993 Heart & Soul (Positive Music)
- 1994 Easy to Love (Positive Music)
- 1995 Straight Ahead (Positive Music)

=== As sideman ===
With Dave Brubeck

- 1991 Quiet as the Moon
- 1996 To Hope! A Celebration
- 1997 So What's New?
- 1998 The 40th Anniversary Tour of the U.K.
- 1999 Hold Fast to Dreams
- 1999 The 40th Anniversary Tour of the U.K
- 2000 Dave Brubeck: Live with the LSO
- 2001 The Crossing
- 2001 Double Live from the U.S.A. and U.K.
- 2002 80th Birthday Concert: Live With the LSO
- 2002 Park Avenue South
- 2003 Classical Brubeck
- 2005 London Flat, London Sharp

With Maynard Ferguson

- 1976 Primal Scream
- 1977 Conquistador
- 1977 New Vintage
- 1978 Carnival
- 1979 Hot
- 1981 Maynard

With others

- 1982 Let's Stay Together, Jean Carn
- 1987 The Bill Holman Band, Bill Holman
- 1988 Body Lines, Rick Strauss
- 1990 Treasure Chest, Bob Florence
- 1991 Strollin' , Charlie Shoemake
- 1992 50th Anniversary Celebration, Kenton Alumni Band
- 1992 Something Cool, Cheryl Bentyne
- 1994 Better Place, Jeff Jarvis
- 1995 Brighter Days, Ken Navarro
- 1995 Contents Under Pressure, Jeff Jarvis
- 1997 A Collection of Great Standards, Michael Civisca
- 1997 Singin' & Swingin' , Nancy Kelly
- 2004 I'd Like You for Christmas, Mary Stahl
- 2006 Midnight in Manhattan, Lisa Hilton
- 2007 After Dark, Lisa Hilton
- 2008 Jazz for Peanuts, David Benoit
- 2017 Remembering Mark Murphy, Nancy Kelly
- 2022 Brazilin Images, César Haas
