= Bruce Gertz =

American jazz musician (born 1952)

- Born: December 15, 1952 (age 73); Providence, Rhode Island, U.S.
- Occupation: Jazz bassist

Bruce David Gertz (born December 15, 1952, Providence, Rhode Island) is an American jazz bassist. He plays both double-bass and electric bass.

Gertz first learned to play guitar, then switched to bass guitar as a teenager, playing with local blues and rock groups. He studied music formally at New England College and Berklee College of Music in the 1970s; after graduating from Berklee in 1976 he taught music there; he is now a professor of music. He worked with George Garzone in the Overtones in the late 1970s and was a co-leader of ensembles with Jerry Bergonzi from 1978 to 1989. He worked with Mike Stern both in the Bergonzi ensembles and with Stern's own quartet. From 1982 to 1985 he was house bassist for the Willow Jazz Cafe in Somerville, Massachusetts. In the 1990s he worked with John Abercrombie, Joey Calderazzo, Ken Cervenka, Adam Nussbaum, Danilo Perez, Dan Reiser, Kurt Rosenwinkel, George Schuller, and others.

== Bibliography ==
- Mastering the Bass. Book 1 (Mel Bay Publications)
- Walkin (Bruce Gertz Music)
- 22 Contemporary Melodic Studies for Electric Bass Vol. 1 (Bruce Gertz Music)
- Let's Play Rhythm (Advance Music)
