= Rupert Nurse =

Trinidadian musician (1910–2001)

- Birth name: Rupert Theophilus Nurse
- Born: 26 December 1910; Port of Spain, Trinidad and Tobago
- Died: 18 March 2001 (aged 90); Arima, Trinidad
- Genres: Jazz, calypso
- Occupation(s): Musician, arranger, record producer
- Instrument(s): Piano, electric piano, double bass, tenor saxophone
- Years active: 1930s-90s

Rupert Theophilus Nurse (26 December 1910 – 18 March 2001) was a Trinidadian musician who was influential in developing jazz and Caribbean music in Britain, particularly in the 1950s.

== Life ==
He was born in Port of Spain, Trinidad, the only child of Arnold Nurse and Gertrude (née Small), and spent some of his childhood in Venezuela before returning to the island to complete his education. He absorbed local calypso music traditions, and started work as a teacher in Tobago. He taught himself piano, and learned arranging skills from a mail order Glenn Miller book, before returning around 1936 to Trinidad where he worked in an electronics business. He also learned to play the tenor saxophone and, with Guyanese saxophonist Wally Stewart, formed the Moderneers (or Modernaires), the first American-style big band in Trinidad. During the Second World War he played with visiting Americans on the island, and began writing jazz arrangements of calypsos.

He travelled to London in 1945, and began playing double bass with guitarist Fitzroy Coleman and pianist Cyril Jones in the Antilles jazz club near Leicester Square. He joined trumpeter Leslie "Jiver" Hutchinson's mostly-black band, with whom he played on radio and toured in Europe, before working with entertainer Cab Kaye in the Netherlands. He also increasingly worked with musicians newly arriving in Britain from the West Indies, including popular pianist Winifred Atwell, and Lord Kitchener (Aldwyn Roberts) and his band; and, along with Lauderic Caton, began experimenting with electronic instruments.

In 1953, Nurse was appointed as musical director of the Melodisc record label established by Emil Shalit, which increasingly sought to release records to appeal to Britain's growing Afro-Caribbean community. He led the label's house band, arranged and produced Kitchener's recordings, and recorded many other musicians of Caribbean origin, including jazz saxophonist Joe Harriott. He also continued to perform as a pianist, and became bandleader at the Sunset Club in Carnaby Street and then at the more up-market Sugar Hill club in St James's, where he met and later recorded with American jazz pianist Mary Lou Williams.

He increasingly used an electric piano and organ, and worked widely in clubs and restaurants in London as a solo performer and with other musicians including steel pan player Hugo Gunning, bassist Coleridge Goode, and pianists Iggy Quail and Russ Henderson. He also taught, devised arrangements for other musicians, and worked as a library cataloguer in London until 1976.

He retired to Arima, Trinidad, but continued to mentor musicians there and write arrangements for them. He died there in 2001, at the age of 90.
