= Jerry Bergonzi =

American jazz saxophonist, composer, and educator (born 1947)

Background information
- Born: October 21, 1947 (age 78); Boston, Massachusetts, United States
- Genres: Jazz
- Occupations: Musician, composer, educator
- Instruments: Tenor saxophone, piano
- Years active: 1970–present
- Labels: Double-Time, Not Fat, Savant, Red, Label Bleu

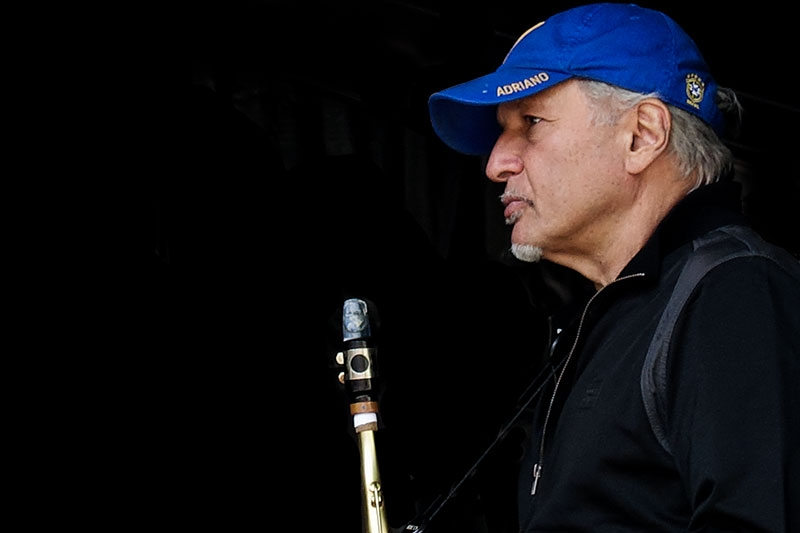
Jerry Bergonzi at the Aarhus Jazz Festival in 2016

Jerry Bergonzi (born October 21, 1947) is an American jazz tenor saxophonist, composer, and educator.

== Early life and education ==
Bergonzi received a B.A. in Music Education from the University of Massachusetts Lowell in 1971 and is the founder of Not Fat Records.

== Career ==
Bergonzi first gained recognition as he became a frequent guest-artist on several Dave Brubeck ensemble tours and recordings during the 1970s, and he held the saxophone chair in the Dave Brubeck quartet from 1979 - 1982. He recorded nine albums with Brubeck, from 1973 to 1981.

Bergonzi teaches at the New England Conservatory of Music in Boston.

He is the author of Inside Improvisation, a multi-volume series of instructional books with play-along CDs and videos, and another series of books about improvisation published by Advance Music. He is also the author of the book/CD set Sound Advice, published by Jamey Aebersold Jazz.

He has recorded on the Blue Note, Red, Not Fat, Concord, Atlantic, Label Bleu, Enja, Columbia, Deux Z, Denon, Canyon, Cadence, Musidisc, Ram, Ninety One, Freelance and Savant recording labels. He has recorded extensively for Double-Time Records.

== Discography ==
As a leader	As sideman
Con Brio (1983); Featuring Bruce Gertz (1985); Uranian Undertow (1986); Caught in the Act (Not Fat, 1988); On Red (1988); Lineage (1989); Inside Out (1989); Etc Plus One (1991); Standard Gonz (Blue Note, 1991); Tilt (1991); Peek a Boo (Evidence; Label Bleu 1993); Vertical Reality (Musidisc, 1995); Just Within (Double Time, 1997); Together for the First Time (1998); On Again (Ram, 1998); Fast Company (Blue Jackel, 1998); Lost in the Shuffle (Double-Time, 1998); Wiggy (Double-Time, 2000); A Different Look (Double-Time, 2001); Live Gonz! (Double-Time, 2002); Intuition (SteepleChase, 2004); Live Gonz II (Double-Time, 2005); Tenor of the Times (Savant, 2006); Tenorist (Savant, 2007); Tenor Talk (Savant, 2008); Saxology (SteepleChase, 2009); Simply Put (Savant, 2009); Three Point Shot (Double Moon/Intuition, 2010); Three for All (Savant, 2010); Convergence (Savant, 2011); 4+1 with Jerry Bergonzi (Effendi, 2011); Sonic Shapes (Stunt, 2011); Shifting Gears (Savant, 2012); Tetragonz (Stunt, 2013); By Any Other Name; Sonora No. 2 Meet Jerry Bergonzi; Intersecting Lines (Savant, 2014); Quintonic (Stunt, 2014); Rigamaroll (Savant, 2015); Spotlight on Standards (Savant, 2016); Inner Journey; Dog Star (Savant, 2017); Seven Rays (Savant 2019); Nearly Blue (Savant 2020)	With Dave Brubeck: 1973 Two Generations of Brubeck; 1974 Brother, the Great Spirit Made Us All; 1979 Back Home; 1980 Tritonis; 1981 Paper Moon; With Joey Calderazzo: 1991 In the Door; 1991 To Know One; With Miles Donahue: 1995 Good Listener; 2003 Standards Vol. 1; 2003 Standards Vol. 2; 2006 In the Pocket; With Daniel Humair: 1991 Edges; 1993 Open Architecture; With Hal Galper: 1994 Just Us; 1995 Rebop; 1999 Let's Call This That; 2018 Cubist; With Bruce Gertz: 1992 Third Eye; 1995 Blueprint; 1996 Discovery Zone; 1998 Shut Wide Open; 1999 Red Handed; With George Gruntz: 1992 Blues 'n Dues Et Cetera; 1996 Sins 'n Wins 'n Funs; With Bob Kaufman: 2001 The Line Between; 2003 Dreaming Out Loud; With Eartha Kitt: 1991 Thinking Jazz; 1995 Standards: Live; With Andy LaVerne: 1994 Spirit of '76; 2001 True Colors; With Nando Michelin: 1996 Facing South; 1997 Common Grounds; 1999 Art; 2000 Chants; 2006 When Einstein Dreams; With Alex Riel: 1994 Emergence; 1998 Unriel; 2000 Rielatin '; 2002 The Riel Deal; With Dave Santoro: 1999 Dave Santoro Standards; 2000 Standards Band II; 2001 The New Standard; With Brooke Sofferman: 1999 Modesty's Odyssey; 2002 The Green Between; 2004 One Stone Two Birds; 2007 Fine Whines; With Richard Sussman: 1978 Free Fall; 2003 Live at Sweet Rhythm; 2012 Continuum; With others: 1987 The Art of the Saxophone, Bennie Wallace; 1993 Sunscreams, Mick Goodrick; 1995 Grey Angel, Jacek Kochan; 2000 Love Everlasting, Bob Moses; 2000 On the Inside Looking In, Dan Wall; 2000 Restoration Comedy, John D'earth; 2001 Global Sound, Dalia Faitelson; 2002 The Complete Miles Davis at Montreux 1973–1991, Miles Davis; 2006 Sometime Ago, Joachim Kühn; 2007 You Don't Know Me, Rebecca Parris; 2008 Eastern Standard Time, Alan Baylock; 2023 Off the Charts, Richard Baratta

== Miscellaneous ==
Bergonzi is also a professional level pianist and bass guitarist.

He plays a mouthpiece by Aaron Drake (Drake "Jerry Bergonzi" Signature Mouthpiece).

Jeff Ellwood compiled and engraved nearly 200 of Bergonzi's original tunes. Bergonzi decided to give the compiled PDF books away for free.

== Gallery ==
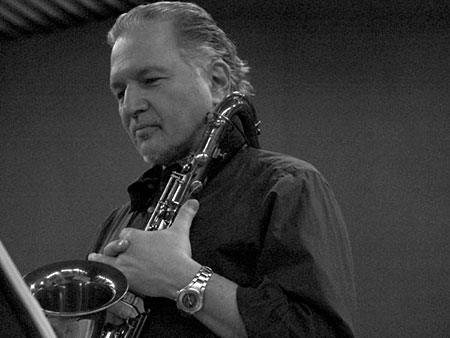

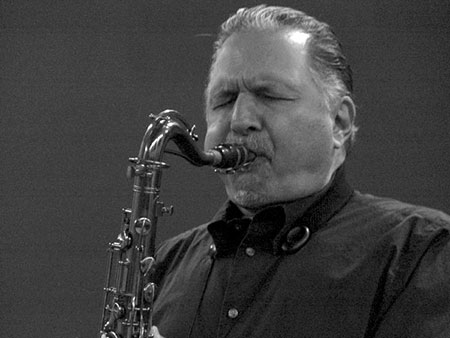

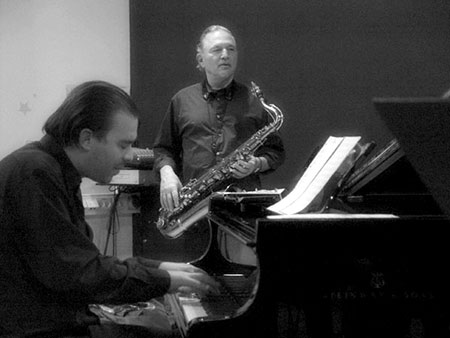
