= John Dankworth =

English composer and musician (1927–2010)

Sir John Dankworth CBE
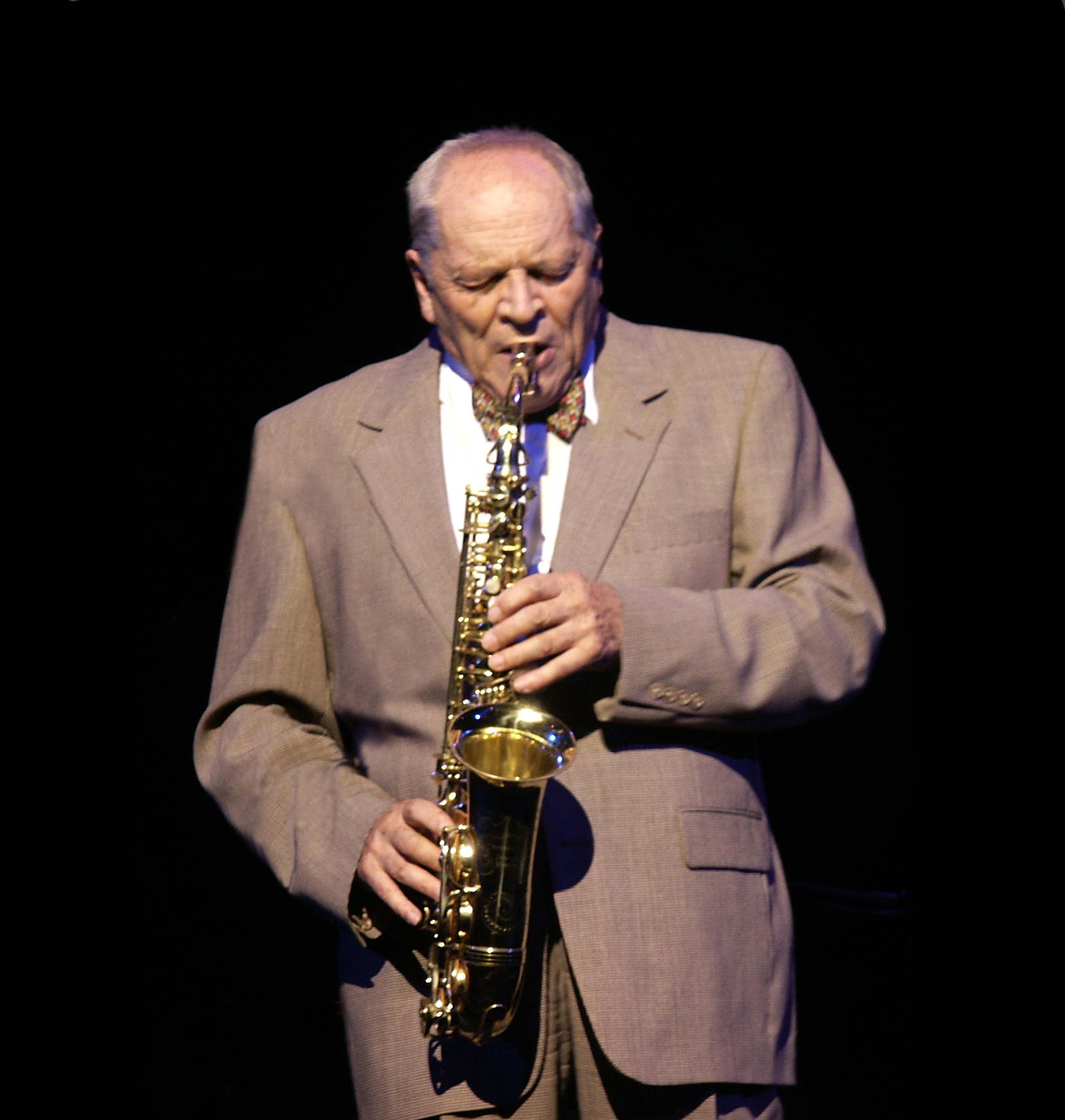
- Dankworth performing at Buxton Opera House on 4 November 2002

Background information
- Born: John Phillip William Dankworth; 20 September 1927; Walthamstow, Essex, England
- Died: 6 February 2010 (aged 82) Marylebone, London, England
- Genres: British jazz; film score
- Occupations: Musician, composer, bandleader
- Instruments: Clarinet, alto saxophone
- Years active: 1946–2009
- Spouses: Cleo Laine (m. 1958)
- Children: Alec; Jacqui

Sir John Phillip William Dankworth CBE (20 September 1927 – 6 February 2010), also known as Johnny Dankworth, was an English jazz composer, saxophonist, clarinettist, and bandleader. With his wife, jazz singer Dame Cleo Laine, he was a music educator and also her music director. The New York Times described him as "one of the leading lights of British jazz." He was also a prolific composer of film soundtracks.

== Biography ==
=== Early years ===
Dankworth was born in Walthamstow, then in Essex (registration district West Ham) in 1927, the son of William Henry Dankworth (1890–1972), sales manager for an electrical insulator works, and Alice Elizabeth (1897–1981), née Houchen. He grew up, within a family of musicians, in Hollywood Way, Highams Park, near Chingford, and attended Selwyn Boys' (Junior) School in Highams Park and later Sir George Monoux Grammar School in Walthamstow. He had violin and piano lessons before settling eventually on the clarinet at the age of 16, after hearing a record by the Benny Goodman Quartet. Soon afterwards, inspired by Charlie Parker, Dankworth learned to play the alto saxophone. He made his first recording in 1944, playing the clarinet on "Good Old Wagon Blues" by Freddie Mirfield and his Garbage Men.

He began his career on the British jazz scene after studying at London's Royal Academy of Music (where his jazz interests were frowned upon) and then national service in the Royal Air Force, during which he played alto sax and clarinet for RAF Music Services. In July 1947, he worked on the Queen Mary in Bobby Kevin's band, and in London with Les Ayling, later in 1947, and with Tito Burns until May 1948. He attended the Paris Jazz Festival in 1949 and played with Charlie Parker. Parker's comments about Dankworth led to the engagement of the young British jazz musician for a short tour of Sweden, with the soprano-saxophonist Sidney Bechet. In 1949, Dankworth was voted Musician of the Year.

=== 1950s ===
In 1950, Dankworth formed a small group, the Dankworth Seven, as a vehicle for his writing activities as well as a showcase for several young jazz players, including himself (alto sax), Jimmy Deuchar (trumpet), Eddie Harvey (trombone), Don Rendell (tenor sax), Bill Le Sage (piano), Eric Dawson (bass) and Tony Kinsey (drums). Vocalist and percussionist Frank Holder also sang and recorded with this ensemble. After three successful years, the group was wound up, although it re-formed for several reunions over the years.

Dankworth formed his big band in 1953. Johnny Dankworth and His Orchestra had a top 10 novelty hit song in 1956 in the UK, "Experiments with Mice" based on "Three Blind Mice", which parodied a number of jazz bands and artists, including Billy May, Benny Goodman, Glenn Miller, Stan Kenton, Sauter-Finegan, and others. By now, Cleo Laine's singing was a regular feature of Dankworth's recordings and public appearances.

The band was earning plaudits from the critics and was invited to the 1959 Newport Jazz Festival, the first British group to receive an invite. The New York Times critic said of this appearance "Mr. Dankworth's group ... showed the underlying merit that made big bands successful many years ago – the swinging drive, the harmonic colour and the support in depth for soloists that is possible when a disciplined, imaginatively directed band has worked together for a long time. This English group has a flowing, unforced, rhythmic drive that has virtually disappeared from American bands". More succinctly, Gerard Lascelles of The Tatler, noted that 'The Dankworth orchestra blew magnificently'. The band performed at the Birdland jazz club in New York City, and shortly afterwards shared the stage with the Duke Ellington Orchestra for a number of concerts. Dankworth's band also performed at a jazz event at New York's Lewisohn stadium where Louis Armstrong joined them for a set.

In 1959, Dankworth became chair of the Stars Campaign for Inter-Racial Friendship, set up to combat the fascist White Defence League. Around this time, he had also refused to travel to South Africa to perform to all-white audiences during Apartheid.

=== 1960s ===
In 1961, Dankworth's recording of Galt MacDermot's "African Waltz" reached the UK Singles Chart, peaked at No. 9, and remained in the chart for 21 weeks. American altoist Cannonball Adderley sought and received Dankworth's permission to record the arrangement and had a minor hit in the US as a result. The piece was also covered by many other groups. In 1967, drummer Ronnie Stephenson's part on "African Waltz" was adapted by the Jimi Hendrix Experience's Mitch Mitchell, to form the basis of the drum part on "Manic Depression".

Dankworth's friendship with trumpeter Clark Terry led to Terry's being a featured soloist on Dankworth's 1964 album The Zodiac Variations, together with Bob Brookmeyer, Zoot Sims, Phil Woods, Lucky Thompson and other guests. Other Dankworth recordings during this period featured many other respected jazz names. Some were full-time members of the Dankworth band at one time or another, like Tony Coe, Mike Gibbs, Peter King, Dudley Moore, George Tyndale, Daryl Runswick, John Taylor, Dick Hawdon and Kenny Wheeler, while others such as Dave Holland, John McLaughlin, Tubby Hayes and Dick Morrissey were occasional participants.

Dankworth began a second career as a composer of film and television scores (often credited as "Johnny Dankworth"). Among his best-known credits are the original themes for two British TV programmes, The Avengers (used from 1961 to 1964) and Tomorrow's World (included on the 1972 LP Lifeline). He also wrote the scores for the films Darling (1965) and Modesty Blaise and Morgan: A Suitable Case for Treatment (both 1966). He appeared in the film All Night Long (1962) with Dave Brubeck and Charles Mingus – playing himself – and played on the theme to the satirical BBC show The Frost Report in 1966.

Dankworth was commissioned to write a piece for the 1967 Farnham Festival; and produced "Tom Sawyer's Saturday"; written for full orchestra and narrator: "a sort of 'Peter and the Wolf' which could be played by most reasonably competent youth orchestras".

During this active period of recording, the Dankworth band nevertheless found time for frequent live appearances and radio shows, including tours in Britain and Europe with Nat King Cole, Sarah Vaughan and Gerry Mulligan, and concerts and radio performances with Lionel Hampton and Ella Fitzgerald.

=== 1970s and 1980s ===
Dankworth's friendship with Duke Ellington continued until the latter's death in 1974. He recorded an album of symphonic arrangements of many Ellington tunes featuring another Ellingtonian trumpet soloist Barry Lee Hall. Dankworth also retained his Ellington links by performing with the Ellington Orchestra under the direction of Duke's son, Mercer Ellington. Dankworth recorded various symphonic albums with Dizzy Gillespie and the Rochester Philharmonic Orchestra and others. Other jazz musicians with whom Dankworth performed include George Shearing, Toots Thielemans, Benny Goodman, Herbie Hancock, Hank Jones, Slam Stewart and Oscar Peterson.

He always had an enthusiasm for jazz education, for many years running the Allmusic summer schools at the Stables in Wavendon near Milton Keynes, a theatre that Laine and he created in January 1970 in their back garden. From 1984 to 1986, Dankworth was professor of music at Gresham College, London, giving free public lectures.

In 1982, Dankworth was awarded an Honorary Doctorate of Music from Berklee College of Music.

=== Later work ===
He appeared with Craig David on Later with Jools Holland on BBC Two. He set up his own record label, Qnotes, in 2003, to reissue some of his old recordings as well as new ones. They include a number with Julian Lloyd Webber, Dudley Moore and members of his family.

Dankworth and Laine's two children are both jazz musicians: Alec Dankworth is a bassist who was also a member of his father's band, and Jacqui Dankworth is a singer.

Dankworth was made a Knight Bachelor in the 2006 New Year's Honours List. He and Dame Cleo Laine were one of the few married couples where both partners held titles in their own right.

He remained an active composer into later life, and he wrote a jazz violin concerto for soloist Christian Garrick to play. This work had its world premiere at the Nottingham Royal Concert Hall on 3 March 2008, in partnership with the Nottingham Youth Orchestra.

In October 2009, at the end of a US tour with his wife, Dankworth was taken ill. The couple cancelled a number of UK concert dates for the following month. Dankworth did return to the concert stage for just one solo at the London Jazz Festival at the Royal Festival Hall, London, in December 2009. He played his sax from a wheelchair. He also played in John & Cleo's Christmas Show from 17 to 20 December 2009 at The Stables in Wavendon.

=== Personal life and death ===
After her divorce from George Langridge became final, in 1957, a year later in 1958 Dankworth married jazz singer Cleo Laine in secret at Hampstead Registry Office. The only witnesses at their wedding were Dankworth's friend, pianist Ken Moule, and arranger David Lindup. The couple had two children, bassist Alec Dankworth and singer Jacqui Dankworth.

On 6 February 2010, Dankworth died at King Edward VII's Hospital in London, from complications of kidney failure and liver failure; he was 82. His death occurred on the afternoon before a show celebrating the 40th anniversary of the foundation of The Stables.

His funeral took place on 1 March 2010 at Milton Keynes Crematorium, followed by a memorial service held at The Stables the same day.

== Discography ==
=== As leader ===
- Experiments with Mice (Parlophone, 1956)
- 5 Steps to Dankworth (Verve, 1957)
- London to Newport (Top Rank, 1959)
- Itinerary of an Orchestra (Parlophone, 1960)
- England's Ambassador of Jazz (Roulette, 1960)
- Collaboration (Roulette, 1962)
- Jazz from Abroad (Roulette, 1963)
- What the Dickens! (Fontana, 1963)
- The Zodiac Variations (Fontana, 1965)
- Modesty Blaise (20th Century Fox, 1966)
- The $1,000,000,000 Collection (Fontana, 1967)
- Off Duty (Fontana, 1969)
- John Dankworth and His Music (Fontana, 1970)
- Full Circle (Philips, 1972)
- Lifeline (Philips, 1973)
- Echoes of Harlem (Compendia, 1988)
- In a Mellow Tone: Tribute to Duke Ellington (Absolute, 2005)
- Spread a Little Happiness with Cleo Laine (Avid, 2006)
- About 42 Years Later with Danny Moss (Avid, 2007)
- Jady Aide with Alec Dankworth (Absolute, 2008)

=== As sideman or guest ===
With Alec Dankworth

- Nebuchadnezzar (1994)
- Rhythm Changes (1996)

With Cleo Laine

- Best Friends (1976)
- Born on a Friday (1976)
- Wordsongs (1978)
- Woman to Woman (1989)
- Live in Manhattan (2001)
- Once Upon a Time (2005)

With others

- Kenny Wheeler, Windmill Tilter (Fontana, 1969)
- Jimmy Witherspoon, Love Is a Five Letter Word (1975)
- Rod Argent, Metro (1984)
- London Symphony Orchestra, Crossing Over the Bridge (1987)
- Al Hirt, Jazzin' at the Pops (1989)
- Jacqui Dankworth, It Happens Quietly (2011)

== Soundtracks ==
=== Film ===
- 1959 We Are the Lambeth Boys
- 1960 The Criminal
- 1960 Saturday Night and Sunday Morning
- 1963 The Servant
- 1965 Darling
- 1965 Return from the Ashes
- 1965 Sands of the Kalahari
- 1966 Morgan!
- 1966 Modesty Blaise
- 1966 The Idol
- 1967 Accident
- 1967 The Last Safari (French "Le Dernier safari")
- 1967 Fathom
- 1968 Salt and Pepper
- 1968 Sleep Is Lovely
- 1968 The Magus
- 1970 The Last Grenade
- 1970 Perfect Friday
- 1971 10 Rillington Place
- 1975 The Kingfisher Caper
- 2000 Gangster No. 1
- 2001 Kiss Kiss (Bang Bang)

=== Television and radio ===
- 1959 The Voodoo Factor
- 1961 Survival
- 1961 The Avengers
- 1964 Rediffusion London startup theme and callsign.
- 1964 "Beefeaters" (theme tune for the ITV series Search for a Star)
- 1965 Tomorrow's World
- 1979 Telford's Change
- 1983 Today (BBC Radio 4)
- 1984 Mitch
- 1989 No Strings
- 1993 Money for Nothing (by Mike Ockrent)
- 2010 ZingZillas (posthumous appearance)
