= Cleo Laine =

British jazz singer (1927–2025)

Dame Cleo Laine DBE
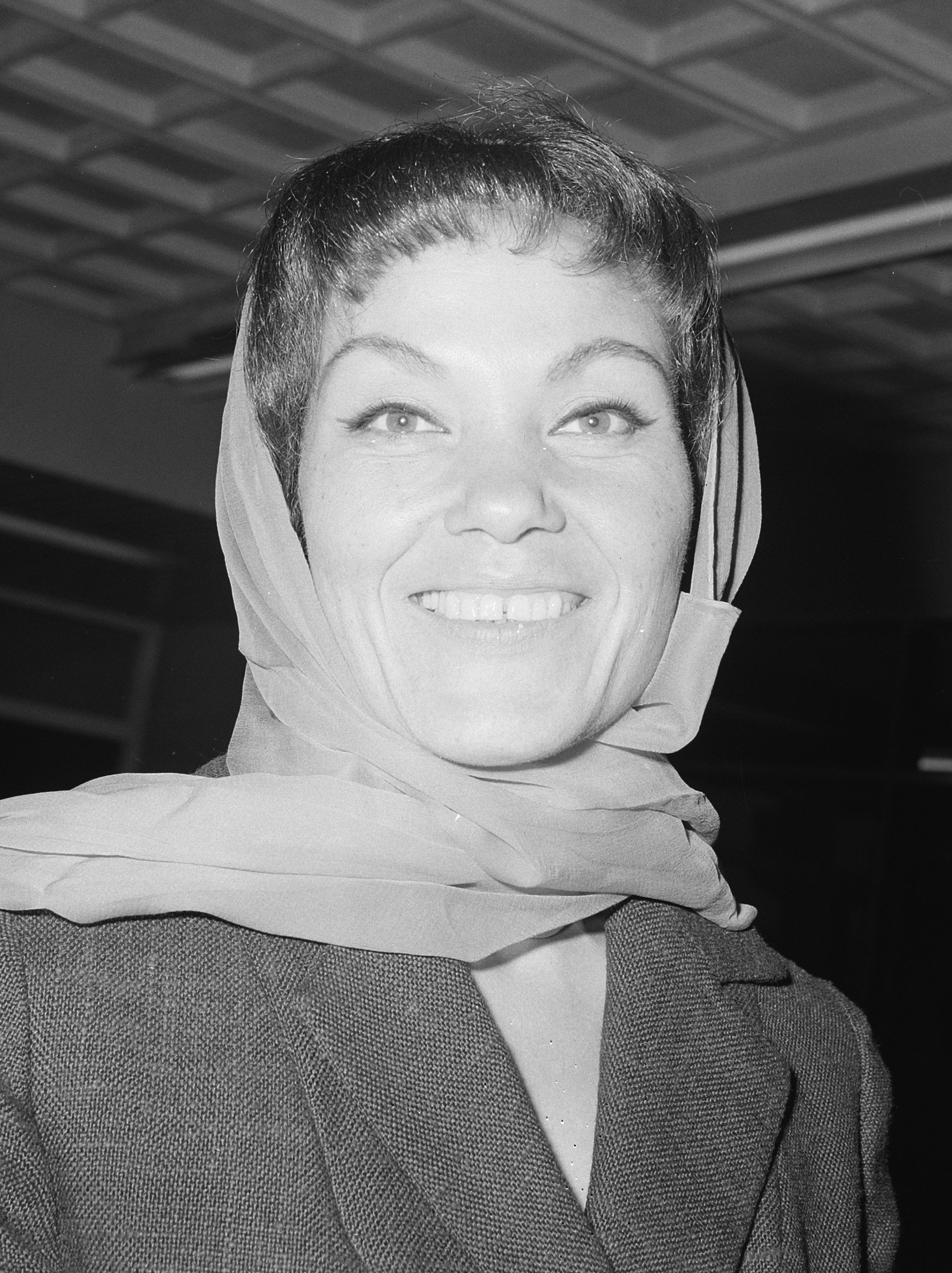
- Laine in 1963

Background information
- Born: Clementine Dinah Bullock; 28 October 1927; Southall, Middlesex, England
- Died: 24 July 2025 (aged 97) Wavendon, Buckinghamshire, England
- Genres: Jazz; pop
- Occupations: Singer; actress
- Years active: 1950s–2018
- Spouses: George Langridge (m. 1946; div. 1957) John Dankworth (m. 1958; died 2010)
- Children: 3, including Alec and Jacqui Dankworth

Dame Cleo Laine, Lady Dankworth (born Clementine Dinah Bullock; 28 October 1927 – 24 July 2025) was a British singer and actress known for her scat singing. She was the wife of jazz composer and musician Sir John Dankworth and the mother of bassist Alec and singer Jacqui Dankworth. Laine had popular success with singles such as "You'll Answer To Me" and appeared in a range of musical theatre productions. She received a number of awards and honours including appointment as an OBE in 1979, and a Grammy in 1986; she became a dame in 1997.

== Early life ==
Laine was born Clementine Dinah Bullock on 28 October 1927, in Southall, Middlesex, the second of three children of Sylvan Alexander Campbell and Minnie Blanche Bullock (née Hitchings) She was registered under the name Clementine Dinah Bullock. Her father was a Jamaican and veteran of the First World War who worked as a building labourer and regularly busked. Her mother was the child of English parents from Wiltshire, both of whom had died some years before their daughter's first marriage to a man named Bullock in 1913.

The family moved constantly, but most of Laine's childhood was spent in Southall. Her parents married in 1933. She was brought up as Clementina Campbell, but it was not until 1953, when she was 26 and applying for a passport for a forthcoming tour of Germany, that Laine found out her real birth name, owing to her parents not being married at the time and her mother registering her with the surname Bullock.

=== Education ===
Laine attended the board school on Featherstone Road, Southall (later known as Featherstone Primary School), and was sent by her mother for singing and dancing lessons at an early age. She, her sister and brother all made uncredited appearances as street urchins in Alexander Korda's 1940 fantasy film The Thief of Baghdad, and afterwards she attended Mellow Lane Senior School in Hayes before going to work as an apprentice hairdresser, a hat-trimmer, a librarian, and in a pawnbroker's shop.

== Career ==
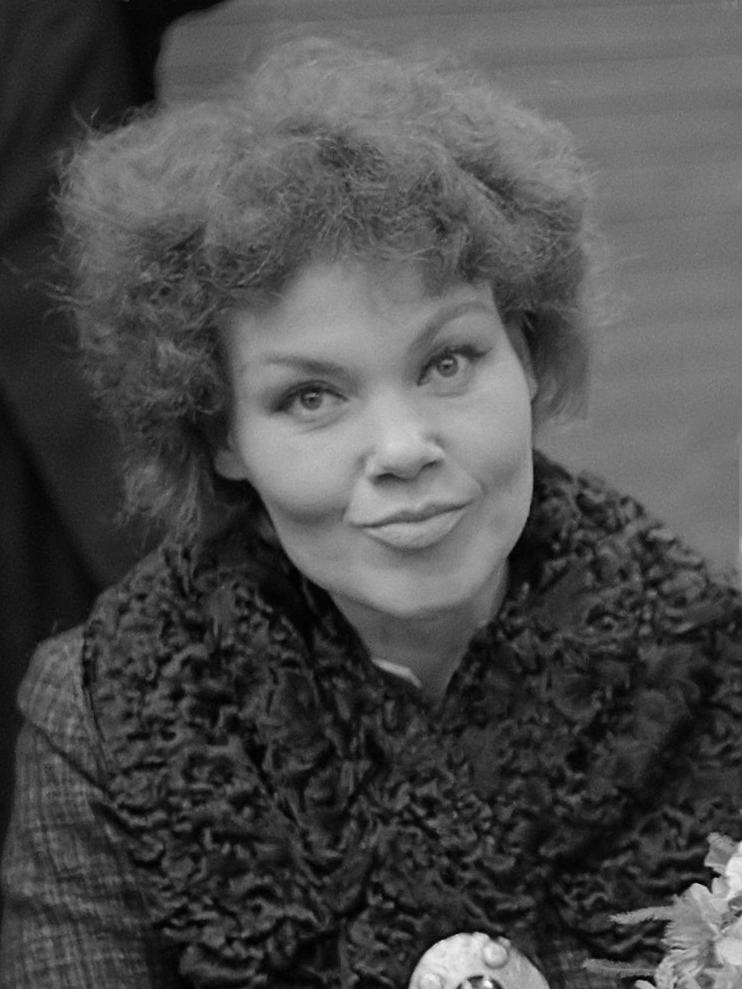
Laine in 1962

At the age of 24 Laine joined John Dankworth's small group, the Johnny Dankworth Seven, after which she adopted the name "Cleo Laine". Laine later played with his big bands, Johnny Dankworth & His Orchestra as well as Johnny Dankworth & His New Radio Orchestra, with which she performed until 1958. Dankworth and Laine married that year. She played the lead in Barry Reckord's play Flesh to a Tiger at London's Royal Court Theatre. The same year, she played the title role in The Barren One, Sylvia Wynter's adaptation of Federico García Lorca's Yerma. This led to other stage work, such as the musical Valmouth in 1959, the play A Time to Laugh in 1962, Boots with Strawberry Jam in 1968, and eventually to her role as Julie in Wendy Toye's production of Show Boat at the Adelphi Theatre in London in 1971. Show Boat had its longest run to date in that London production, 910 performances.

During this period, Laine had two major recording successes. "You'll Answer to Me" reached the British Top 10 while Laine was in the 1961 Edinburgh Festival production of Kurt Weill's opera/ballet The Seven Deadly Sins. In 1964, her Shakespeare and All that Jazz album with Dankworth was well received. Dankworth and Laine founded the Stables theatre in 1970, in what was the old stables block in the grounds of their home. It eventually hosted more than 350 concerts per year.

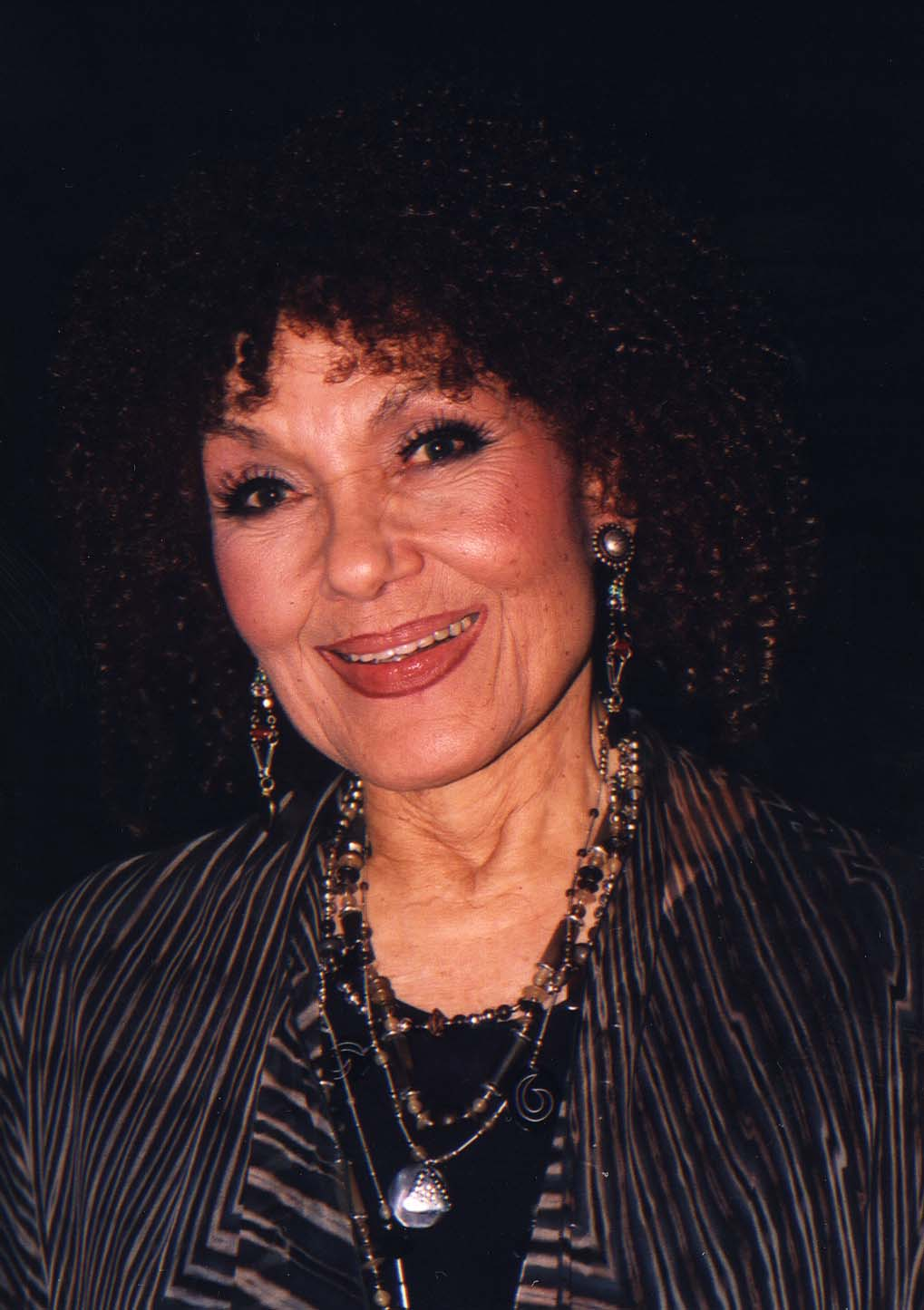
Laine in 1997

In 1972, Laine had a successful tour of Australia; she released six top-100 albums in that country throughout the 1970s. Her first performance in the United States was a concert later that year at New York's Lincoln Center, followed in 1973 by the first of her many Carnegie Hall appearances. Tours of the US and Canada soon followed, and with them a succession of record albums and television appearances, including The Muppet Show in 1977. This led, after several nominations, to her first Grammy award, in recognition of the live recording of her 1983 Carnegie concert. She kept touring into the 21st century, including in Australia in 2005. She performed live in the UK as late as 2018. Other important recordings during that time were duet albums with Ray Charles (Porgy and Bess) as well as Arnold Schoenberg's Pierrot Lunaire, for which she was nominated for a Grammy Award.

Laine played roles in Colette, a musical by Dankworth in 1979; and in Stephen Sondheim's A Little Night Music in 1983 and Franz Lehár's The Merry Widow the following year for Michigan Opera. In 1985 she originated the role of Princess Puffer in The Mystery of Edwin Drood on Broadway, for which she received a Tony nomination. In 1989, she received a Los Angeles critics' award for her portrayal of the Witch in Sondheim's Into the Woods. In May 1992, Laine appeared with Frank Sinatra for a week of concerts at the Royal Albert Hall in London.

In 1978, Derek Jewell of the Sunday Times dubbed her "quite simply the best singer in the world." Laine was billed as having a "five-octave range".

== Personal life and death ==
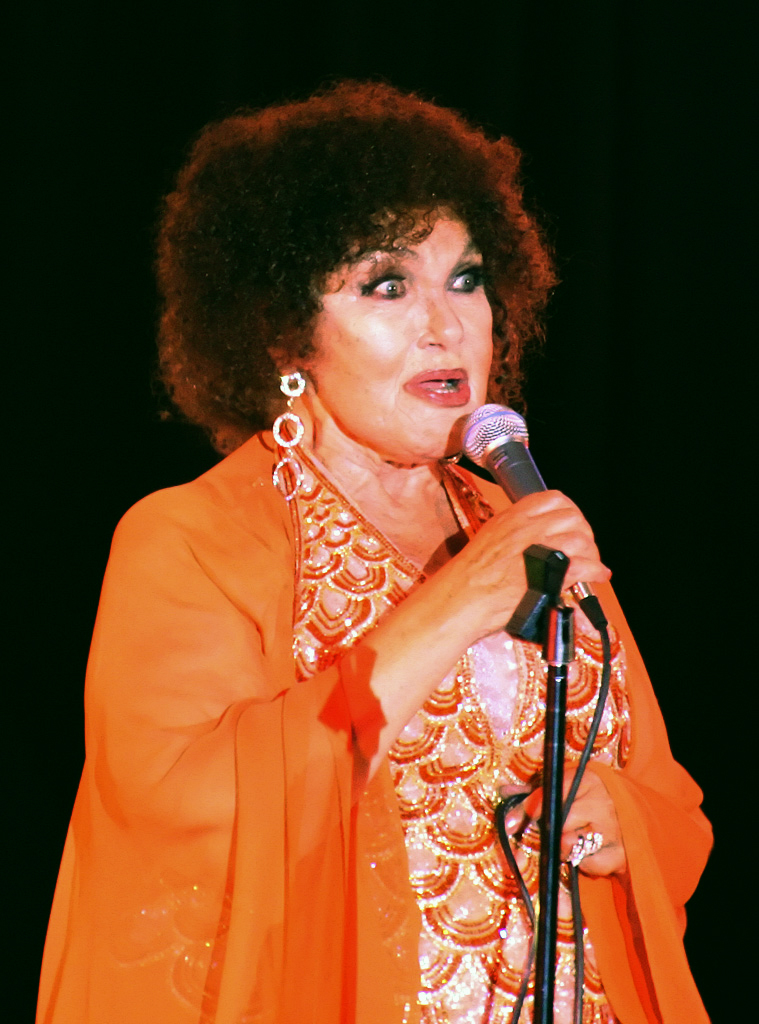
Laine performing at Playa Vista, Los Angeles, in 2007

In 1946, Laine married George Langridge, a roof tiler, with whom she had a son. The couple divorced in 1957. Her son predeceased her, in 2019, aged 72.

In 1958, she married John Dankworth, and the couple had two children, bassist Alec Dankworth and singer Jacqui Dankworth. They remained married until his death on 6 February 2010. That same day, Laine performed at a concert at The Stables to mark the venue's 40th anniversary, and announced Dankworth's death at the end of the show to the shock of the audience.

Laine died at her home in Wavendon, on 24 July 2025, aged 97.

== Awards and honours ==
- Officer of the Order of the British Empire, 1979
- Grammy Award nominations:
  - 1975: Best Pop Vocal Performance, Female (Cleo Laine Live at Carnegie Hall)
  - 1976: Best Classical Vocal Soloist Performance (Cleo Laine Sings Pierrot Lunaire And Songs By Ives)
  - 1977: Best Jazz Vocal Performance (with Ray Charles) (Porgy And Bess)
  - 1983: Best Jazz Vocal Performance, Female (Smilin' Through)
- Grammy Award for Best Jazz Vocal Performance, Female, 1986
- Lifetime Achievement Award, US recording industry, 1991
- Dame Commander of the Order of the British Empire, 1997
- Jazz Lifetime Achievement Silver Medal, Worshipful Company of Musicians, 1998
- Lifetime Achievement Award, BBC Jazz Awards, 2002 (jointly with John Dankworth)
- Gold Award, BBC Jazz Awards, 2008 (jointly with John Dankworth)
- BASCA Gold Badge Award, 2016
- Honorary Fellow 2004–2005, Hughes Hall, University of Cambridge
- A street in Adelaide, South Australia, was named after her.
- Honorary Doctorates from Berklee College of Music (1982), the University of Cambridge (2004), the University of York, Brunel University and University of Luton, and an honorary Master of Arts degree from The Open University (1975).

== Discography ==
Laine's recorded works include the following:

- She's the Tops! (MGM, 1957)
- In retrospect (MGM), 1957
- Jazz Date with Tubby Hayes (Wing, 1961)
- All About Me (Fontana, 1962)
- Shakespeare and All That Jazz (Fontana, 1964)
- Woman to Woman (Fontana, 1966)
- Sir William Walton's Facade with Annie Ross (Fontana, 1967)
- If We Lived on the Top of a Mountain (Fontana, 1968)
- The Unbelievable (Fontana, 1968)
- Soliloquy (Fontana, 1968)
- Portrait (Philips, 1971)
- Feel the Warm (Columbia, 1972)
- An Evening with Cleo Laine & the John Dankworth Quartet (Philips, 1972)
- I Am a Song (RCA Victor, 1973)
- Day by Day (Stanyan, 1973)
- Cleo Laine Live!!! at Carnegie Hall (RCA Victor, 1974)
- A Beautiful Thing (RCA Victor, 1974)
- Sings Pierrot Lunaire (RCA Red Seal, 1974)
- Cleo Close Up (RCA Victor, 1974)
- Spotlight On Cleo Laine (Philips, 1974)
- Easy Livin (Stanyan, 1975)
- Cleo Laine (MGM, 1975)
- Best Friends with John Williams (RCA Victor, 1976)
- Born on a Friday (RCA Victor, 1976)
- Porgy & Bess with Ray Charles (RCA Victor, 1976)
- At the Wavendon Festival (Black Lion, 1976)
- A Lover and His Lass with Johnny Dankworth (Esquire, 1976)
- Return to Carnegie (RCA Victor, 1977)
- Cleo's Greatest Show Hits (RCA Victor, 1978)
- Gonna Get Through (RCA Victor, 1978)
- Cleo Laine Sings Word Songs (RCA Victor, 1978)
- Cleo Laine in Australia with Johnny Dankworth (World Record Club, 1978)
- Cleo's Choice (Marble Arch, 1974)
- Sometimes When We Touch with James Galway (RCA Red Seal, 1980)
- Cleo Laine in Concert (RCA Victor, 1980)
- One More Day (Sepia, 1981)
- Smilin' Through with Dudley Moore (CBS, 1982)
- Let the Music Take You with John Williams (CBS, 1983)
- That Old Feeling (K West, 1984)
- Cleo at Carnegie: The 10th Anniversary Concert (RCA Victor, 1984)
- At the Carnegie: Cleo Laine in Concert (Sierra, 1986)
- The Unforgettable Cleo Laine (PRT, 1987)
- Cleo Sings Sondheim with Jonathan Tunick (RCA Victor, 1988)
- Woman to Woman (RCA Victor, 1989)
- Jazz (RCA Victor, 1991)
- Nothing without You with Mel Tormé (Concord Jazz, 1992)
- On the Town with Michael Tilson Thomas (Deutsche Grammophon, 1993)
- Blue and Sentimental (RCA Victor, 1994)
- Solitude with the Duke Ellington Orchestra (RCA Victor, 1995)
- Quality Time (Sepia, 2002)
- Loesser Genius with Laurie Holloway (Qnote, 2003)
