= Dave Brubeck discography =

Dave Brubeck (1920–2012) was an American jazz pianist and composer.

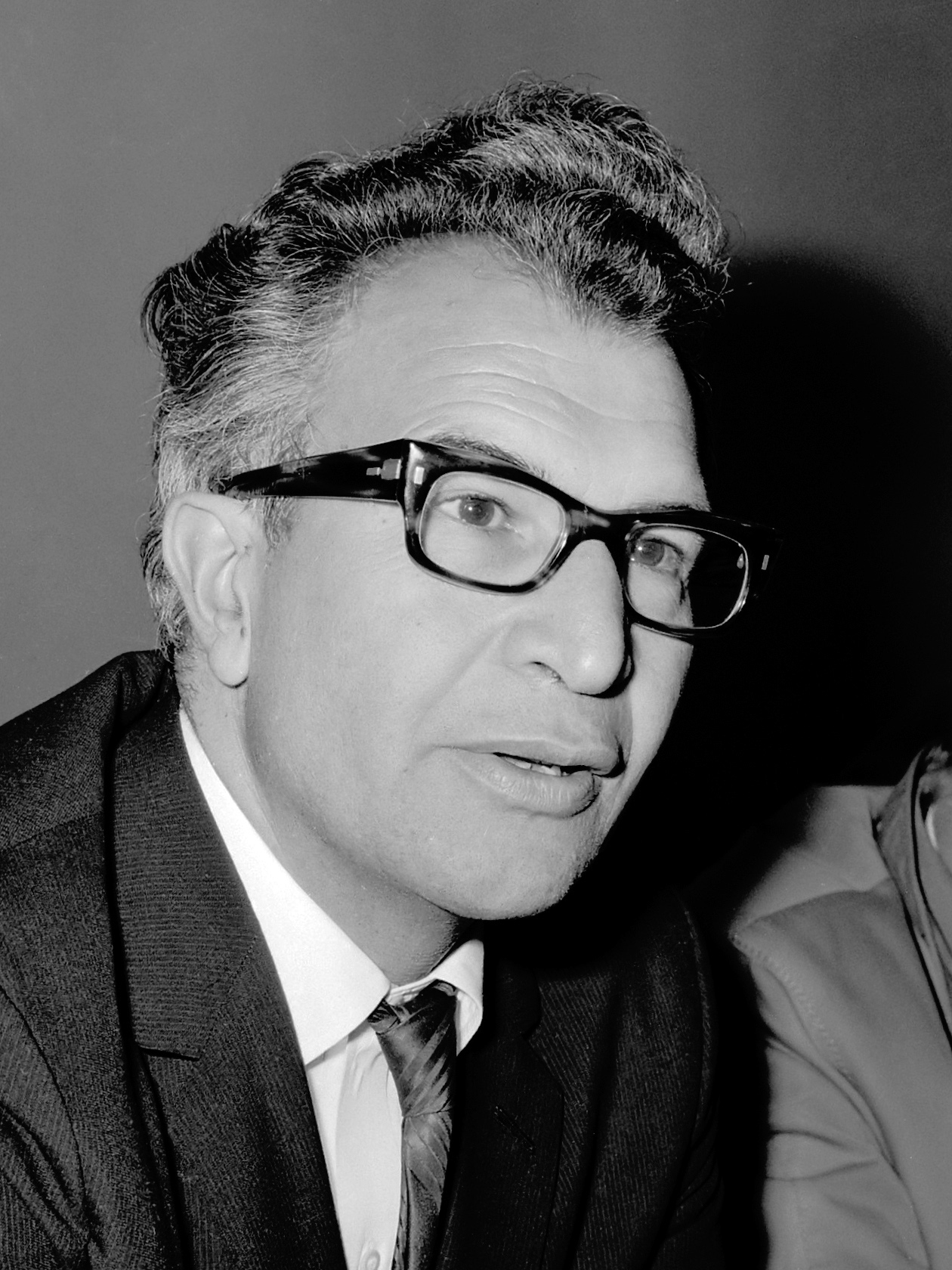
Brubeck in 1964

== As leader ==
Year recorded	Title	Peak positions	Label	Personnel/Notes
Year recorded	Title	US BB	Label	Personnel/Notes
1948	Old Sounds From San Francisco	—	Fantasy	Octet, with Paul Desmond (alto sax), Jack Weeks (bass), Cal Tjader (drums), William O. Smith (clarinet), Bob Collins (baritone sax), Dick Collins (trumpet), David Van Kriedt (tenor sax); 10' LP reissued as part of Dave Brubeck Octet
1949-50	Distinctive Rhythm Instrumentals	—	Fantasy	Trio, with Ron Crotty (bass), Cal Tjader (vibraphone, drums, percussion); 3 Volumes of 10' LPs. Reissued as part of The Dave Brubeck Trio
1950	Distinctive Rhythm Instrumentals	—	Fantasy	Octet, with Paul Desmond (alto sax), Jack Weeks (bass), Cal Tjader (drums), William O. Smith (clarinet), Bob Collins (baritone sax), Dick Collins (trumpet), David Van Kriedt (tenor sax); 10' LP reissued as part of Dave Brubeck Octet
1948–50	Dave Brubeck Octet	—	Fantasy	Octet, with Paul Desmond (alto sax), Jack Weeks (bass), Cal Tjader (drums), William O. Smith (clarinet), Bob Collins (baritone sax), Dick Collins (trumpet), David Van Kriedt (tenor sax); reissue of previous 10' LPs
1950	The Dave Brubeck Trio	—	Fantasy	Trio, with Ron Crotty (bass), Cal Tjader (vibraphone, drums, percussion) (Volumes 1 & 2); reissue of previous 10' LPs
1951	Brubeck/Desmond	—	Fantasy	Quartet, with Paul Desmond (alto sax), Fred Dutton, bass; Herb Barman, drums; reissue contained a track from the 1954 10' LP Jazz Interwoven
1952-53	Jazz at Storyville	—	Fantasy	Quartet, with Paul Desmond (alto sax), Bull Ruther or Ron Crotty, bass; Lloyd Davis, drums; in concert
1952	The Dave Brubeck Quartet	—	Fantasy	Quartet, with Paul Desmond (alto sax), Bull Ruther (bass), Herb Barman and Lloyd Davis (drums; separately); reissue contained a track from the 1954 10' LP Jazz Interwoven
1952	Jazz at the Blackhawk	—	Fantasy	Quartet, with Paul Desmond (alto sax), Ron Crotty (bass), Lloyd Davis (drums); in concert
1953	Jazz at Oberlin	—	Fantasy	Quartet, with Paul Desmond (alto sax), Ron Crotty (bass), Lloyd Davis (drums); in concert
1953	Brubeck & Desmond at Wilshire-Ebell	—	Fantasy	Quartet, with Paul Desmond (alto sax), Ron Crotty (bass), Lloyd Davis (drums); in concert
1953	Jazz at the College of the Pacific	—	Fantasy	Quartet, with Paul Desmond (alto sax), Ron Crotty (bass), Joe Dodge (drums); in concert
1953	Jazz at the College of the Pacific, Vol. 2	—	Original Jazz Classics	Quartet, with Paul Desmond (alto sax), Ron Crotty (bass), Joe Dodge (drums); in concert
1954	Dave Brubeck at Storyville: 1954	8	Columbia	Quartet, with Paul Desmond (alto sax), Ron Crotty or Bob Bates(bass), Joe Dodge (drums); in concert
1954	Jazz Goes to College	8	Columbia	Quartet, with Paul Desmond (alto sax), Bob Bates (bass), Joe Dodge (drums); in concert
1954	Brubeck Time	5	Columbia	Quartet, with Paul Desmond (alto sax), Bob Bates (bass), Joe Dodge (drums)
1954–55	Jazz: Red Hot and Cool	7	Columbia	Quartet, with Paul Desmond (alto sax), Bob Bates (bass), Joe Dodge (drums); in concert
1956	Brubeck Plays Brubeck	—	Columbia	Solo piano
1956	Dave Brubeck and Jay & Kai at Newport	—	Columbia	Quartet, with Paul Desmond (alto sax), Norman Bates (bass), Joe Dodge (drums); in concert; album shared with the J. J. Johnson–Kai Winding Quintet
1957	Jazz Impressions of the U.S.A.	—	Columbia	Quartet, with Paul Desmond (alto sax), Norman Bates (bass), Joe Morello (drums)
1957	Dave Brubeck Plays and Plays and...	—	Fantasy	Solo piano
1957	Reunion	—	Fantasy	Quintet, with Paul Desmond (alto sax), David Van Kriedt (tenor sax), Norman Bates (bass), Joe Morello (drums)
1957	Jazz Goes to Junior College	24	Columbia	Quartet, with Paul Desmond (alto sax), Norman Bates (bass), Joe Morello (drums)
1957	Dave Digs Disney	—	Columbia	Quartet, with Paul Desmond (alto sax), Norman Bates (bass), Joe Morello (drums)
1958	The Dave Brubeck Quartet in Europe	—	Columbia	Quartet, with Paul Desmond (alto sax), Eugene Wright (bass), Joe Morello (drums); in concert
1958	Newport 1958	—	Columbia	Quartet, with Paul Desmond (alto sax), Joe Benjamin (bass), Joe Morello (drums); in concert
1958	Jazz Impressions of Eurasia	—	Columbia	Quartet, with Paul Desmond (alto sax), Joe Benjamin (bass), Joe Morello (drums)
1959	Gone with the Wind	—	Columbia	Quartet, with Paul Desmond (alto sax), Eugene Wright (bass), Joe Morello (drums)
1959	Time Out	2	Columbia	Quartet, with Paul Desmond (alto sax), Eugene Wright (bass), Joe Morello (drums)
1960	The Riddle	—	Columbia	Quartet, with Bill Smith (clarinet), Eugene Wright (bass), Joe Morello (drums)
1960	Southern Scene	—	Columbia	Quartet, with Paul Desmond (alto sax), Eugene Wright (bass), Joe Morello (drums)
1960	Live in Essen, Grugahalle, 1960	—	WDR	Quartet, with Paul Desmond (alto sax), Eugene Wright (bass), Joe Morello (drums)
1960	Brubeck and Rushing	—	Columbia	Quintet, with Paul Desmond (alto sax), Eugene Wright (bass), Joe Morello (drums), Jimmy Rushing (vocals)
1960	Bernstein Plays Brubeck Plays Bernstein	13	Columbia	With Paul Desmond (alto sax), Eugene Wright (bass), Joe Morello (drums), New York Philharmonic
1960	Brubeck à la mode	—	Fantasy	Quartet, with Bill Smith (clarinet), Eugene Wright (bass), Joe Morello (drums)
1960	Tonight Only!	—	Columbia	Quintet, with Paul Desmond (alto sax), Eugene Wright (bass), Joe Morello (drums), Carmen McRae (vocals)
1961	Near-Myth/Brubeck-Smith	—	Fantasy	Quartet, with Bill Smith (clarinet), Eugene Wright (bass), Joe Morello (drums)
1961	Time Further Out	8	Columbia	Quartet, with Paul Desmond (alto sax), Eugene Wright (bass), Joe Morello (drums)
1961	Brandenburg Gate: Revisited	137	Columbia	With Paul Desmond (alto sax), Eugene Wright (bass), Joe Morello (drums), orchestra
1961	Take Five Live	—	Columbia	Quintet, with Paul Desmond (alto sax), Eugene Wright (bass), Joe Morello (drums), Carmen McRae (vocals); in concert
1961	The Real Ambassadors	—	Columbia	Soundtrack for the musical
1961–62	Countdown—Time in Outer Space	24	Columbia	Quartet, with Paul Desmond (alto sax), Eugene Wright (bass), Joe Morello (drums)
1962	Bennett/Brubeck: The White House Sessions, Live 1962	—	Columbia Legacy	with Tony Bennett (vocals); released 2013
1962	Bossa Nova U.S.A.	14	Columbia	Quartet, with Paul Desmond (alto sax), Eugene Wright (bass), Joe Morello (drums)
1962	Brubeck in Amsterdam	—	Columbia	Quartet, with Paul Desmond (alto sax), Eugene Wright (bass), Joe Morello (drums); in concert; released 1969
1963	The Dave Brubeck Quartet at Carnegie Hall	37	Columbia	Quartet, with Paul Desmond (alto sax), Eugene Wright (bass), Joe Morello (drums); in concert
1964	Time Changes	81	Columbia	With Paul Desmond (alto sax), Eugene Wright (bass), Joe Morello (drums), orchestra
1964	Jazz Impressions of Japan	—	Columbia	Quartet, with Paul Desmond (alto sax), Eugene Wright (bass), Joe Morello (drums)
1964	Jazz Impressions of New York	142	Columbia	Quartet, with Paul Desmond (alto sax), Eugene Wright (bass), Joe Morello (drums)
1964	Dave Brubeck in Berlin	—	CBS	Quartet, with Paul Desmond (alto sax), Eugene Wright (bass), Joe Morello (drums); in concert
1962–65	Angel Eyes	122	Columbia	Quartet, with Paul Desmond (alto sax), Eugene Wright (bass), Joe Morello (drums)
1962–65	My Favorite Things	133	Columbia	Quartet, with Paul Desmond (alto sax), Eugene Wright (bass), Joe Morello (drums)
1965	Time In	—	Columbia	Quartet, with Paul Desmond (alto sax), Eugene Wright (bass), Joe Morello (drums)
1966	Anything Goes! The Dave Brubeck Quartet Plays Cole Porter	—	Columbia	Quartet, with Paul Desmond (alto sax), Eugene Wright (bass), Joe Morello (drums)
1966	Jackpot!	—	Columbia	Quartet, with Paul Desmond (alto sax), Eugene Wright (bass), Joe Morello (drums); in concert
1967	Bravo! Brubeck!	—	Columbia	With Paul Desmond (alto sax), Chamin Correa (guitar), Eugene Wright (bass), Joe Morello (drums), Salvatore Agueros (bongo, conga); in concert
1967	Buried Treasures	—	Columbia Legacy	Quartet, with Paul Desmond (alto sax), Eugene Wright (bass), Joe Morello (drums); in concert; released 1998
1967	The Last Time We Saw Paris	—	Columbia	Quartet, with Paul Desmond (alto sax), Eugene Wright (bass), Joe Morello (drums); in concert
1967	Their Last Time Out: The Unreleased Live Concert, December 26, 1967	—	Columbia Legacy	In concert; released 2011
1968	Compadres	—	Columbia	Quartet, with Gerry Mulligan (baritone sax), Jack Six (bass), Alan Dawson (drums); in concert
1968	Blues Roots	—	Columbia	Quartet, with Gerry Mulligan (baritone sax), Jack Six (bass), Alan Dawson (drums)
1968	The Light in the Wilderness	—	Decca	With Gerre Hancock (organ), Frank Proto (bass, del rhuba), William Justus (baritone), David Frerichs (drums, tablas), Miami University A Cappella Singers (vocals), George Barron (director), Erich Kunzel (conductor)
1969	The Gates of Justice	—	Decca	With Robert Delcamp, (organ), Jack Six (bass), Alan Dawson (drums), Cantor Harold Orbach (tenor voice), McHenry Boatwright (bass baritone voice), The Westminster Choir, The Cincinnati Brass Ensemble
1970	Brubeck/Mulligan/Cincinnati	—	Decca	With Gerry Mulligan (baritone sax), Jack Six (bass), Alan Dawson (drums), Cincinnati Symphony Orchestra;
1970	Live at the Berlin Philharmonie	—	Columbia	Quartet, with Gerry Mulligan (baritone sax), Jack Six (bass), Alan Dawson (drums); in concert
1960-68	Summit Sessions	—	Columbia	Released 1970.
1971	The Last Set at Newport	—	Atlantic	Quartet, with Gerry Mulligan (baritone sax), Jack Six (bass), Alan Dawson (drums); in concert
1971	Truth Is Fallen	—	Atlantic	With Chris Brubeck (bass trombone, electric piano, vocals), Peter Madcat Ruth (harmonica, flute, vocals), Jim Cathcart (organ, trumpet, vocals), Stephan Dudash (guitar, violin, vocals), Dave Mason (guitar, viola, vocals), Chris Brown (electric bass, bass, vocals), Lowell Thompson (bongo drums), Peter Bonisteel (percussion), Charlene Peterson (soprano voice), St. John's Assembly, the Cincinnati Symphony Orchestra
1972	We're All Together Again for the First Time	—	Atlantic	Quintet, with Gerry Mulligan (baritone sax), Paul Desmond (alto sax), Jack Six (bass), Alan Dawson (drums); in concert
1973	Two Generations of Brubeck	—	Atlantic	With Darius Brubeck (electric piano, piano, clavinet), Jerry Bergonzi (soprano sax, tenor sax), Chris Brubeck (electric bass, trombone), Dan Brubeck (drums), Randie Powell (percussion), David Powell (double bass), Perry Robinson (clarinet), Peter Madcat Ruth (harmonica), David Dutemple (electric bass), Richie Morales (drums), Stephan Dudash (violin), Dave Mason (guitar), Jimmy Cathcart (electric piano)
1973–74	All the Things We Are	—	Atlantic	One track trio, with Jack Six (bass), Alan Dawson (drums); some tracks quartet, with Lee Konitz (alto sax), Jack Six (bass), Roy Haynes (drums); one track quintet, with Anthony Braxton (alto sax) added; one track quartet with Braxton replacing Konitz
1974	Brother, the Great Spirit Made Us All	—	Atlantic	With Darius Brubeck (electric piano), Jerry Bergonzi (soprano sax, tenor sax), Chris Brubeck (electric bass, trombone), Dan Brubeck (drums), David Powell (double bass), Perry Robinson (clarinet), Peter Madcat Ruth (harmonica, Jew's harp)
1975	1975: The Duets	—	A&M	Duo, with Paul Desmond (alto sax)
1976	25th Anniversary Reunion	—	A&M	Quartet, with Paul Desmond (alto sax), Eugene Wright (bass), Joe Morello (drums)
1977	The New Brubeck Quartet: Live at Montreux	—	Tomato	Quartet, with Darius Brubeck (electric piano), Chris Brubeck (electric bass, trombone), Dan Brubeck (drums). In concert
1978	The New Brubeck Quartet: A Cut Above	—	Direct to Disk	Quartet, with Darius Brubeck (electric piano), Chris Brubeck (electric bass, trombone), Dan Brubeck (drums). In concert
1979	La Fiesta de la Posada (The Festival of the Inn)	—	Columbia	With Richard Lewis (bass), Mel Lewis (drums), Lee Arellano (percussion, vocals), Phyllis Bryn-Julson (Soprano), Gene Tucker (tenor), Jake Gardner (baritone), John Stephens (bass), Dale Warland Singers (chorus), Edith Norberg's Carillon Choristers (chorus), St. Paul Chamber Orchestra, Dennis Russell Davies (conductor)
1979	Back Home	—	Concord	Quartet, with Jerry Bergonzi (tenor sax), Chris Brubeck (bass, trombone), Butch Miles (drums)
1980	Tritonis	—	Concord	Quartet, with Jerry Bergonzi (tenor sax), Chris Brubeck (bass, trombone), Butch Miles (drums)
1981	Paper Moon	—	Concord	Quartet, with Jerry Bergonzi (tenor sax), Chris Brubeck (bass, bass trombone), Randy Jones (drums)
1982	Concord on a Summer Night	—	Concord	Quartet, with William O. Smith (clarinet), Chris Brubeck (bass, bass trombone), Randy Jones (drums)
1982	Aurex Jazz Festival '82	—	Eastworld	Michael Pedicin (tenor sax), Chris Brubeck (electric bass, bass trombone), Randy Jones (drums). In concert
1984	Marian McPartland's Piano Jazz with guest: Dave Brubeck	—	The Jazz Alliance/Concord	Recorded live on air on March 23, 1984
1984	For Iola	—	Concord	Quartet, with William O. Smith (clarinet), Chris Brubeck (bass, bass trombone), Randy Jones (drums)
1985	Reflections	—	Concord	Quartet, with William O. Smith (clarinet), Chris Brubeck (bass, bass trombone), Randy Jones (drums)
1986	Blue Rondo	—	Concord	Quartet, with William O. Smith (clarinet), Chris Brubeck (bass, bass trombone), Randy Jones (drums)
1987	Moscow Night	—	Concord	Quartet, with William O. Smith (clarinet), Chris Brubeck (bass, bass trombone), Randy Jones (drums)
1987	New Wine	—	MusicMasters	with the Montreal International Jazz Festival Orchestra; in concert; released 1990
1988-91	Quiet as the Moon	—	MusicMasters	Soundtrack for the This Is America, Charlie Brown episode "The NASA Space Station"; with Bobby Militello (alto sax, tenor sax, flute), Matt Brubeck (cello), Chris Brubeck (bass, bass trombone), Jack Six (bass), Dan Brubeck (drums), Randy Jones (drums)
1991	Once When I Was Very Young	—	MusicMasters	Quartet with William O. Smith (clarinet), Jack Six (bass), Randy Jones (drums)
1993	Trio Brubeck	—	MusicMasters	With Chris Brubeck (electric bass, bass trombone), Dan Brubeck (drums)
1993	Late Night Brubeck: Live from the Blue Note	—	Telarc	Quartet, with Bobby Militello (alto sax, tenor sax, flute), Jack Six (bass), Randy Jones (drums); in concert
1993	Nightshift: Live at the Blue Note	—	Telarc	Sextet with William O. Smith (clarinet), Bobby Militello (alto sax, tenor sax, flute), Chris Brubeck (electric bass, bass trombone), Jack Six (bass), Randy Jones (drums); In concert
1994	Just You, Just Me	—	Telarc	Solo piano
1994	In Their Own Sweet Way	—	Telarc	Most tracks quintet, with Darius Brubeck (piano), Matt Brubeck (cello), Chris Brubeck (bass, bass trombone), Dan Brubeck (drums)
1995	Young Lions & Old Tigers	—	Telarc	With Chris Brubeck (electric bass), Jack Six (bass), Randy Jones (drums)
1995	To Hope! A Celebration	—	Telarc	With quartet, Cathedral Choral Society and Orchestra
1996	A Dave Brubeck Christmas	—	Telarc	Solo piano
1998	So What's New?	—	Telarc	Quartet, with Bobby Militello (sax, flute), Jack Six (bass), Randy Jones (drums)
1995–98	Double Live from the USA & UK	—	Telarc	Quartet, with Bobby Militello (alto sax), Alec Dankworth and Jack Six (bass; separately), Randy Jones (drums); in concert; released 2001
1998	The 40th Anniversary Tour of the U.K.	—	Telarc	Quartet, with Bobby Militello (alto sax), Alec Dankworth (bass), Randy Jones (drums); in concert
2000	80th Birthday Concert: Live with the LSO	—	Telarc	With Bobby Militello (alto sax, flute), Darius Brubeck (piano), Matt Brubeck (cello), Chris Brubeck (bass, bass trombone), Dan Brubeck (drums); London Symphony Orchestra; in concert
2000	One Alone	—	Telarc	Solo piano; in concert
2000	The Crossing	—	Telarc	Quartet, with Bobby Militello (alto sax, flute), Alec Dankworth (bass), Randy Jones (drums)
2001	The Gates of Justice	—	Naxos	With Michael Moore (bass), Randy Jones (drums), Alberto Mizrahi (cantor), Kevin Deas (bass baritone), Baltimore Choral Arts Society (chorus), Tom Hall (director), The Baltimore Symphony Orchestra, Russell Gloyd (director)
2002	Brubeck in Chattanooga	—	Choral Arts Society of Chattanooga	In concert
2002	Park Avenue South	—	Telarc	Quartet, with Bobby Militello (alto sax, flute), Michael Moore (bass), Randy Jones (drums); in concert
2002	Classical Brubeck	—	Telarc	with the London Symphony Orchestra
2004	Private Brubeck Remembers	—	Telarc	Solo piano; limited edition adds an interview with Brubeck
2004	London Flat, London Sharp	—	Telarc	Quartet, with Bobby Militello (alto sax), Michael Moore (bass), Randy Jones (drums)
2004	Brubeck meets Bach	—	Sony Classical	with the Bach Collegium Munich; in concert
2004	Songs	—	Naxos	with John de Haan and Jane Giering (vocals)
2006	Indian Summer	—	Telarc	Solo piano
2007	Live in '64 & '66	—	Naxos/Jazz Icons	Concerts in Belgium in 1964 and Germany in 1966 (DVD)
1958–2007	50 Years of Dave Brubeck: Live at the Monterey Jazz Festival, 1958-2007	—	Monterey Jazz Festival/Concord	In concert
2010	Lullabies	—	Verve	Solo piano
2020	Time OutTakes	—	Brubeck Editions	Quartet, with Paul Desmond (alto sax), Eugene Wright (bass), Joe Morello (drums)
2022	Live From Vienna 1967	—	Brubeck Editions	Trio, with Eugene Wright (bass), Joe Morello (drums); Recorded live in Vienna November 12, 1967
2023	Live From the Northwest, 1959	—	Brubeck Editions	Quartet, with Paul Desmond (alto sax), Eugene Wright (bass), Joe Morello (drums); Recorded Live April 4 and 5, 1959 in Portland Oregon

=== Compilations ===
- Dave Brubeck's Greatest Hits (Columbia CS 9284 / CL 2484, 1966, No. 134 US)
- Dave Brubeck's All-Time Greatest Hits (Columbia PG 32761, 1977)
- Interchanges '54 (Columbia Jazz Masterpieces 467917 2, 1991)
- Time Signatures: A Career Retrospective (Columbia Legacy C4K 52945, 1992)
- Ballads (Legacy 501795 2, 2001)
- The Essential Dave Brubeck (Columbia Legacy, 2003)

== Guest appearances ==
With Yo-Yo Ma

"Joy to the World" and "Concordia" on Songs of Joy & Peace by Yo-Yo Ma & Friends (Sony Classical, 2008)

Various artists

"Some Day My Prince Will Come" and "Alice in Wonderland" (with Roberta Gambarini) on Everybody Wants to Be a Cat: Disney Jazz Volume 1 (Disney, 2011)
"Heigh-Ho" on Saving Mr. Banks (Original Motion Picture Soundtrack) (Disney, 2013)
