= One Alone (album) =

Studio album by Dave Brubeck
- Released: August 22, 2000
- Recorded: September 3, 1997–April 4, 2000
- Genre: Jazz
- Length: 1:02:28
- Label: Telarc
- Producer: Russell Gloyd, John Snyder

Dave Brubeck chronology
So What's New? (1998)	One Alone (2000)	Dave Brubeck: Live with the LSO (2000)

One Alone is a 2000 studio album by pianist Dave Brubeck. It was the fifth album on which Brubeck performed unaccompanied solo piano, preceded by Brubeck Plays Brubeck (1956), Plays and Plays and... (1957), Just You, Just Me (1994) and A Dave Brubeck Christmas (1996).

== Reception ==
Professional ratings
Review scores
Source	Rating
AllMusic	4/5 stars
The Penguin Guide to Jazz	3.5/4 stars

Ken Dryden reviewed the album for AllMusic and wrote that "This highly recommended CD is yet another of his finest hours". Dryden described the "...unusual chord substitutions to the very familiar "Over the Rainbow"" as "dazzling".

Reviewing the album for the Jazz Times, Larry Appelbaum wrote that "The pieces are played in either ballad or medium tempo, and all the trademark Brubeck characteristics are here: his stacking of chords with moving inner voicings on "I'll Never Smile Again," the wry and audacious polytonality of "Bye Bye Blues" and the superimposition of one meter upon another on "Harbor Lights." Few pianists today take so many risks with standard repertoire, and fewer still with such wit, elegance and taste".

All About Jazz reviewed the album and wrote that "After decades of ground-breaking work, done without a road map or an agenda except for love of the music, Brubeck prevails triumphantly on "One Alone", his many bands that accessorized his music fading from the same level of prominence as Brubeck's sound but never disappearing from memory. ...Performing some of his favorite tunes from the 1930s and 1940s with their deceptively simple melodies, Brubeck not only offers a different perspective on what has been considered the ordinary, but also provides fresh evidence—as if any further evidence were needed—that his style is unmistakable and that his contributions are invaluable".

== Track listing ==
1. "That Old Feeling" (Lew Brown, Sammy Fain) – 6:51
2. "I'll Never Smile Again" (Ruth Lowe) – 4:23
3. "One Alone" (Otto Harbach, Oscar Hammerstein II, Sigmund Romberg) – 6:39
4. "You've Got Me Crying Again" (Isham Jones, Charles Newman) – 3:59
5. "Someone to Watch over Me" (George Gershwin, Ira Gershwin) – 4:22
6. "Just Squeeze Me (But Please Don't Tease Me)" (Duke Ellington, Lee Gaines) – 4:35
7. "Harbor Lights" (Hugh Williams) – 4:08
8. "Things Ain't What They Used to Be" (Mercer Ellington, Ted Persons) – 4:21
9. "Summer Song" (Dave Brubeck) – 5:20
10. "Red Sails in the Sunset" (Williams, Jimmy Kennedy) – 3:58
11. "Weep No More" (Brubeck) – 4:23
12. "Bye Bye Blues" (Dave Bennett, Chauncey Gray, Fred Hamm, Bert Lown) – 5:36
13. "Over the Rainbow" (Harold Arlen, Yip Harburg) – 3:53

== Personnel ==
- Dave Brubeck - piano

Production

- Anilda Carrasquillo - art direction, cover design
- Robert Friedrich - assistant engineer
- James Salzano - cover photo
- John Snyder - engineer, producer
- Michael Bishop, Jack Renner - engineer
- Russell Gloyd - producer
- Elaine Martone - production supervisor
- Mark Conese, Simon James, Mark Nixdorf - technical assistance
