= Dave Brubeck Quartet (album) =

The Dave Brubeck Quartet

Studio album by The Dave Brubeck Quartet
- Released: 1952
- Recorded: September 1952, Hollywood, California
- Genre: Jazz
- Label: Fantasy

The Dave Brubeck Quartet chronology
Dave Brubeck Octet (1950)	The Dave Brubeck Quartet (1952)	Jazz at Oberlin (1953)

Professional ratings
Review scores
Source	Rating
Billboard	8/10 stars

The Dave Brubeck Quartet is a jazz album released by The Dave Brubeck Quartet in several iterations between 1952 and 1962.

== Background ==
The album was first released in 1952, on the Fantasy Records label, as Fantasy 10" LP 3-7. The tracks were recorded in September 1952 at the "Surf Club" in Hollywood, California. In place of Quartet regulars Bob Bates and Joe Dodge, are Wyatt "Bull" Ruther on bass and, depending on the track, either Herb Barman or Lloyd Davis on drums. The liner notes were written by Barry Ulanov. Pressings of this version are on either green or red translucent vinyl.

The album was reissued with an alternate track lineup as 3230 in 1956. In addition to the 1952 recordings, this version includes a track recorded in March 1954 at the University of California. In 1962 the same tracks would be reissued again, some on an album with the same title (8093) and others on an album entitled "Jazz at Storyville" numbered 8080. In the UK and New Zealand the album was issued as the 12" Vogue Records LP LDE 104.

== Personnel ==
- Dave Brubeck - piano
- Paul Desmond - alto sax
- Bull Ruther - bass
- Herb Barman - drums
- Lloyd Davis - drums

== Track listing for Fantasy 3-7 and Vogue LDE 104 ==
1. "This Can't Be Love" (Richard Rodgers, Lorenz Hart)
2. "Look for the Silver Lining" (Jerome Kern, Anne Caldwell)
3. "My Romance" (Richard Rodgers, Lorenz Hart)
4. "Just One of Those Things" (Cole Porter)
5. "Stardust" (Hoagy Carmichael, Mitchell Parish)
6. "Lulu's Back in Town" (Al Dubin, Harry Warren)
7. "Alice in Wonderland" (Bob Hilliard, Sammy Fain)
8. "All the Things You Are" (Jerome Kern, Oscar Hammerstein II)

== Track listing for Fantasy 3230 ==
1. "My Romance"
2. "Just One of Those Things"
3. "Lulu's Back In Town"
4. "All the Things You Are"
5. "Alice in Wonderland"
6. "Stardust"
7. "At a Perfume Counter" (Joseph A. Burke)
