= Desmond: Here I AM =

Compilation album by Paul Desmond Quintet & Quartet
- Released: 2015
- Genre: Jazz
- Length: 66:00
- Label: Fresh Sound; FSRCD 873; Originally released by Fantasy Records in 1954; LP3-21; LP3225

Desmond: Here I AM is a jazz compilation album issued by the Fresh Sound label in 2015. It contains the first two record releases of alto saxophonist Paul Desmond as a leader: Paul Desmond Quintet with The Bill Bates Singers, a 10-inch vinyl record from 1954, and Paul Desmond Quartet Featuring Don Elliott, a 12-inch from 1956, both originally released on the label Fantasy Records.

The album features different lineups led by Desmond, including highlights musicians like tenor saxophonist Dave van Kriedt, trumpeter Don Elliott, guitarist Barney Kessel, drummer Joe Dodge, and bassists Norman Bates and Bob Bates.

The repertoire consists of original compositions by Desmond, Elliott and van Kriedt, as well as a handful of standards, including songs authored by Tom Adair, J. Fred Coots, Matt Dennis, B.G. DeSylva, James Dyrenforth, Carroll Gibbons, Haven Gillespie, Jerome Kern, Gerry Mulligan, and the brothers George and Ira Gershwin.

== Track listing ==
1. Jeruvian (van Kriedt) 3:35
2. Baroque [Choral Prelude] (van Kriedt) 1:43
3. But Happy [Fugue IV] (van Kriedt) 3:03
4. Misty Window (van Kriedt) 3:21
5. Warm Cradle (van Kriedt) 2:49
6. A Garden in the Rain (Dyrenforth-Gibbons) 2:48
7. Soon (G. & I. Gershwin) 2:18
8. Winky (Bill Bates) 2:56
9. Will I Know (Jack Weeks) 2:52
10. Jazzabelle (Desmond) 6:32
11. A Watchmans Carroll (Elliott) 3:04
12. Everything Happens to Me (Adair-Dennis) 5:16
13. Let's Get Away from It All (Adair-Dennis) 4:09
14. Look for the Silver Lining (Kern-DeSylva) 4:44
15. Sacre Blues (Desmond) 6:05
16. You Go to My Head (Coots-Gillespie) 5:43
17. Line for Lyons (Mulligan) 5:26

== Personnel on tracks ==
- 1–5: Paul Desmond Quintet – Dick Collins, trumpet; Paul Desmond, alto sax; Dave van Kriedt, tenor sax; Bob Bates, bass; Joe Dodge, drums. Recorded at Radio Recorders, Hollywood, October 1954.
- 6–9: Paul Desmond Quintet with The Bill Bates Singers. Paul Desmond, alto sax; Barney Kessel, guitar (except on #9); Jack Weeks, trombone (only on #9); Bob Bates, bass; Joe Dodge, drums. The Bill Bates Singers: Sue Allen, Bill Brown, Loulie Jean Norman, Bernie Parke, Bill Thompson, Gloria Wood, vocals. Recorded at Radio Recorders, Hollywood, October/November 1954.
- 10–17: The Paul Desmond Quartet Featuring Don Elliott. Don Elliott, mellophone (trumpet on #13); Paul Desmond, alto sax; Norman Bates, bass; Joe Chevrolet [aka Joe Dodge], drums. Recorded in San Francisco, February 14, 1956.

== Notes ==
- Tracks #1–8, from the 10-inch album (Fantasy LP3-21)
- Tracks #9–17, from the 12-inch album (Fantasy LP3235)
