= Van Kriedt =

van Kriedt or Van Kriedt is a surname. Notable people with the surname include:

- David Van Kriedt (1922–1994), American composer, jazz saxophonist, and music teacher
- Larry Van Kriedt (born 1954), American-born Australian jazz musician
