= Joe Dodge =

American drummer

Background information
- Born: Joseph George Dodge; February 9, 1922; Monroe, Wisconsin, United States
- Died: August 18, 2004 (aged 82) Lake Elsinore, California, United States
- Genre: Jazz
- Occupation: Drummer
- Formerly of: Dave Brubeck Quartet

Joseph George Dodge (February 9, 1922 – August 18, 2004) was an American jazz musician.

A subtle and creative drummer, Dodge will probably always be better known for his role primarily as a timekeeper and accompanist who set a standard for blending propulsive swing, creating an adaptability that allowed him to remain in the background and not interfere with the soloist's line, which even extended to a reluctance to take drum solos.

Born in Monroe, Wisconsin, Dodge was raised and grew up in San Francisco, California. Dodge initially studied to be a symphonic percussionist, but like many young drummers of his generation, he was primarily influenced by Gene Krupa and later listened Jo Jones, Jimmy Crawford and Shelly Manne, different sources of inspiration that helped him to create his own creative style.

During World War II, Dodge fulfilled his military duties from 1942 until 1945. While serving, he played drums in the Coast Artillery band, where he met tenor saxophonist Dave van Kriedt, who introduced him to Dave Brubeck and Paul Desmond. After demobilization in 1946, Dodge worked in several dixieland groups and dance bands around the Bay area.

In 1950, Dodge became tired of road touring and economic instability and was able to get a job working in a bank. Nonetheless, he still kept in touch with Desmond, who arranged for him to play an engagement in an octet led by Brubeck as a temporary replacement for drummer Cal Tjader. By then, the Brubeck octet was playing at the San Francisco Opera House, where they opened the show for Nat King Cole and Woody Herman.

A few years later, Desmond again recommended Dodge to Brubeck. As a result, he became the regular drummer of the Dave Brubeck Quartet, participating with the group in different music venues in the United States while recording five successful albums between 1953 and 1956. During the same period, Dodge was featured in two albums with different formats directed by Desmond.

Late in 1956, Dodge was worn down by the travel and intense schedule with the quartet and wanted to spend more time with his family. He then told Brubeck it was time to look for another drummer and took a day job in San Francisco. Meanwhile, in the Quartet's New York stays, Desmond had heard the Marian McPartland trio at the Hickory House and was impressed with Joe Morello, the drummer who had been working with her since 1953. Desmond then suggested to Brubeck that he should hire Morello and, when Brubeck heard Morello playing, he asked him if he would be interested in joining his group. The drummer did not jump at the opportunity.

In 1957, Dodge had a chance to return to the jazz spotlight when bandleader Stan Kenton offered him a job as a temporary replacement for Mel Lewis, but Dodge decided to turn the offer down. From 1958 until he retired in 1981, he combined his activities working in the liquor business with musical engagements in the evenings.

Dodge kept in contact with Desmond until the saxophonist's death in 1977 and never lost touch with Brubeck. At one point, Dodge played at Brubeck's fiftieth wedding anniversary in 1992 at the Claremont Hotel in Oakland, where he shared time with many of the pianist's former colleagues.

Joe Dodge died in 2004 in Lake Elsinore, California, at the age of 82.

== Discography ==
Year	Album	Leader	Label	Ref
1953	Jazz at the College of the Pacific	Dave Brubeck Quartet	Fantasy Records	
1954	Jazz Goes to College	Dave Brubeck Quartet	Columbia Records	
1954	Paul Desmond Quintet with The Bill Bates Singers	Paul Desmond	Fantasy Records	
1955	Brubeck Time	Dave Brubeck Quartet	Columbia Records	
1955	Jazz: Red Hot and Cool	Dave Brubeck Quartet	Columbia Records	
1956	Dave Brubeck and Jay & Kai at Newport	Dave Brubeck Quartet, J. J. Johnson, Kai Winding	Columbia Records	
1956	Paul Desmond Quartet Featuring Don Elliott	Paul Desmond	Fantasy Records	
