= For Iola =

Live album by Dave Brubeck
- Released: 1985
- Recorded: 1984
- Genre: Jazz
- Label: Concord Jazz
- Producer: Russell Gloyd

Dave Brubeck chronology
Aurex Jazz Festival '82 (1982)	For Iola (1985)	Reflections (1985)

For Iola is an album by the American musician Dave Brubeck, released in 1985. It is credited to his quartet. The album is dedicated to Brubeck's wife, Iola. Brubeck delayed the mailing of the tentative album packaging to Iola, who was in charge of his newsletter, so that she would surprised.

== Production ==
Produced by Russell Gloyd, the album was recorded at the 1984 Concord Jazz Festival. Brubeck was backed by Bill Smith on clarinet, Randy Jones on drums, and Chris Brubeck on electric bass and trombone. Brubeck composed six of the album's songs. "I Hear a Rhapsody" is a version of the jazz standard. "Big Bad Basie" is a tribute to Count Basie. The quartet employed echo effects on the title track.

== Critical reception ==
Professional ratings
Review scores
Source	Rating
AllMusic	3/5 stars
Oakland Tribune	3/4 stars
Omaha World-Herald	3/5 stars
The Penguin Guide to Jazz on CD, LP & Cassette	2.5/4 stars
Times-Colonist	5/5 stars

The Globe and Mail labeled For Iola "pure Brubeck: sincere ... but wooden, rather one-dimensional and rather dated." The Courier News called "I Hear a Rhapsody" "vintage Brubeck ensemble work at its swinging best, with plenty of swirling, smashing chords in the leader's solo." The Oakland Tribune concluded that "Smith's contributions are often fascinating, providing Brubeck with his strongest foil since the late Paul Desmond."

The New York Daily News considered For Iola, "without question, one of Dave Brubeck's better recordings". The Buffalo News opined that "whenever Brubeck plays a piano solo, he crashes around like a wounded hippo in a linen closet." The Omaha World-Herald said that Brubeck is "still a bit too bombastic for his own good".

== Track listing ==
No.	Title	Length
1.	"Polly"
2.	"I Hear a Rhapsody"
3.	"Thank You"
4.	"Big Bad Basie"
5.	"For Iola"
6.	"Summer Song"
7.	"Pange Lingua March"
