= Dave Brubeck Octet =

Studio album by Dave Brubeck Octet
- Released: 1956
- Recorded: 1946–1950
- Genre: Jazz
- Length: 47:24
- Label: Fantasy

Dave Brubeck Octet chronology
Brubeck Trio with Cal Tjader, Volume 2 (1949)	Dave Brubeck Octet (1956)	The Dave Brubeck Quartet (1952)

Professional ratings
Review scores
Source	Rating
AllMusic	4/5 stars
The Penguin Guide to Jazz Recordings	3.5/4 stars

The Dave Brubeck Octet is a jazz album released by the Dave Brubeck Octet in 1956. It compiles the octet's complete recorded output made between 1946 and 1950, which was originally released in other forms. The artwork was credited to Arnold Roth.

== Background ==
Jack Sheedy, the owner of a San Francisco–based record label called Coronet, was talked into making the first recording of an octet and a trio featuring Brubeck. But Sheedy was unable to pay his bills and in 1949 turned his masters over to his record stamping company, the Circle Record Company, owned by Max and Sol Weiss. The Weiss brothers soon changed the name of their business to Fantasy Records.

The first 10 songs on the compilation were recorded between 1946 and 1948 and were released starting in 1950 by Fantasy under the title Old Sounds From San Francisco, first as two EPs then as a single 10-inch LP. The final eight tracks were recorded in 1950 and first released on a 10-inch LP in 1956 under the title Distinctive Rhythm Instrumentals. Later in 1956, Fantasy compiled the tracks from Old Sounds From San Francisco and Distinctive Rhythm Instrumentals and issued the Dave Brubeck Octet album as a 12-inch LP.

Fantasy re-issued the Distinctive Rhythm Instrumentals album in its original 10-inch red vinyl format for Record Store Day 2012.

== Track listing ==
1. The Way You Look Tonight (Dorothy Fields & Jerome Kern) 3:00
2. Love Walked In (George Gershwin & Ira Gershwin) 2:38
3. What Is This Thing Called Love? (Cole Porter) 2:42
4. September in the Rain (Al Dubin & Harry Warren) 2:52
5. Prelude (Dave VanKriedt) 2:12
6. Fugue on Bop Themes (Dave VanKriedt) 2:43
7. Let's Fall in Love (Harold Arlen, Ted Koehler & Cole Porter) 2:23
8. Ipca (William O. Smith) 2:42
9. How High the Moon (Nancy Hamilton & Morgan Lewis) 6:52
10. Serenade Suite (Dave VanKriedt) 4:35
11. Playland at the Beach (Dave Brubeck) 1:30
12. The Prisoner's Song (Guy Massey) 1:05
13. Schizophrenic Scherzo (William O. Smith) 2:14
14. Rondo (Dave Brubeck) 1:33
15. I Hear a Rhapsody (Jack Baker, George Fragos & Dick Gasparre) 2:10
16. You Go To My Head (J. Fred Coots & Haven Gillespie) 4:02
17. Laura (Johnny Mercer & David Raksin) 2:11
18. Closing Theme (Dave Brubeck) 0:33

== Personnel ==
- Dave Brubeck – piano
- Paul Desmond – alto saxophone
- Jack Weeks – bass
- Cal Tjader – drums
- William O. Smith – clarinet & baritone saxophone
- Bob Collins – trombone
- Dick Collins – trumpet
- David Van Kriedt – tenor saxophone
