= Young Lions & Old Tigers =

1995 album by Dave Brubeck

Young Lions & Old Tigers is a 1995 studio album by American jazz pianist Dave Brubeck.

Recorded to celebrate Brubeck's 75th birthday, the album features guests such as Jon Hendricks, Roy Hargrove, Michael Brecker and George Shearing.

== Track listing ==
Written by Dave Brubeck except where stated otherwise.

1. "Roy Hargrove" – 5:26
2. "How High The Moon" – 2:32 (Nancy Hamilton)
3. "Michael Brecker Waltz" – 4:54
4. "Here Comes McBride" – 3:24
5. "Joe Lovano Tango" – 3:49
6. "In Your Own Sweet Way" – 7:49
7. "Joshua Redman" – 6:18
8. "Together" – 5:40
9. "Moody" – 6:56
10. "Gerry-Go-Round" – 4:42
11. "Ronnie Buttacavoli" – 6:39
12. "Deep In A Dream" – 4:40 (Edward Delange, Jimmy Van Heusen)

== Personnel ==
- Dave Brubeck – piano
- Michael Brecker – tenor saxophone (track 3)
- Chris Brubeck – electric bass (tracks 9–11)
- Ronnie Buttacavoli – flugelhorn (track 11)
- Roy Hargrove – trumpet (track 1)
- Jon Hendricks – vocals (track 2)
- Randy Jones – drums (tracks 1, 3, 5, 7, 9–11)
- Joe Lovano – tenor saxophone (track 5)
- Christian McBride – double bass (track 4)
- James Moody – tenor saxophone, vocals (track 9)
- Gerry Mulligan – baritone saxophone (tracks 8, 10)
- Joshua Redman – tenor saxophone (track 7)
- George Shearing – piano (track 6)
- Jack Six – double bass (tracks 1, 3, 5, 7)

Professional ratings
Review scores
Source	Rating
The Penguin Guide to Jazz Recordings	3/4 stars
