= Just You, Just Me (album) =

Studio album by Dave Brubeck
- Released: 1994
- Recorded: January 4, 1994 - Performing Arts Center, State University of New York City, Purchase.; February 15, 1994 - Studio A, Power Station, New York City.; June 29, 1994 - Carriage House Studio, Stamford, Connecticut.
- Genre: Jazz
- Length: 58:28
- Label: Telarc

Professional ratings
Review scores
Source	Rating
AllMusic	3/5 stars
The Penguin Guide to Jazz Recordings	3/4 stars

Just You, Just Me is a 1994 album by Dave Brubeck. This album is the 3rd of Brubeck's solo works preceded by Brubeck Plays Brubeck and Plays and Plays and.... There was a 37-year gap between "Brubeck Plays and Plays" and this album with Brubeck focusing on working with his quartet during that time. Brubeck writes that for this album, "...I prefer to record in the same way as I play at home..." with all of the songs on this album being first takes with no advanced editing. The exception to this is "I Understand" of which Brubeck did three takes playing each in different ways.

== Track listing ==
1. "Just You, Just Me" (Jesse Greer) – 2:59
2. "Strange Meadowlark" (Dave Brubeck) – 4:37
3. "It's the Talk of the Town" (Marty Symes) – 4:14
4. "Variations on Brother, Can You Spare a Dime?" – 7:27
5. "Lullaby" (Dave Brubeck) – 5:08
6. "Tribute to Stephen Foster" – 6:10
7. "I Married an Angel" – 4:11
8. "Music, Maestro, Please!" – 5:03
9. "Briar Bush" (Dave Brubeck) – 4:43
10. "Newport Waltz" (Dave Brubeck) – 3:18
11. "I Understand" – 3:37
12. "More Than You Know" – 6:10

== Personnel ==
=== Musicians ===
- Dave Brubeck – Piano

=== Production ===
- Recording Producer – Russell Gloyd and John Snyder
- Recording Engineer – Jack Renner
- Executive Producer – Robert Woods
- Technical Assistance – Dave Cozzie, Robert Smith, Thomas Knab, and Scott Burgess
- Editor – Jay Newland
- Production Supervisor – Elaine Martone
