= Jazz Impressions of the U.S.A. =

Studio album by Dave Brubeck Quartet
- Released: 1957
- Recorded: November 16 and 26, 1956; February 4, 1957
- Genre: Jazz
- Length: 56:05
- Label: Columbia

Dave Brubeck Quartet chronology
Dave Brubeck and Jay & Kai at Newport (1956)	Jazz Impressions of the U.S.A. (1957)	Reunion (1957)

Professional ratings
Review scores
Source	Rating
Allmusic	3/5 stars

Jazz Impressions of the U.S.A. is a studio album by Dave Brubeck Quartet. It is the first album by the Quartet to feature drummer Joe Morello.

== Track listing ==
All tracks composed by Dave Brubeck

1. "Ode to a Cowboy" – 5:02
2. "Summer Song" – 6:06
3. "Yonder for Two" – 5:00
4. "History of a Boy Scout" – 4:33
5. "Plain Song" – 4:04
6. "Curtain Time" – 4:46
7. "Sounds of the Loop" – 7:29
8. "Home at Last" – 3:52

== Personnel ==
The Dave Brubeck Quartet

- Dave Brubeck - piano
- Paul Desmond - alto saxophone
- Joe Morello - drums
- Norman Bates - bass

Technical

- Arnold Roth - artwork
