= Brubeck à la mode =

Studio album by Dave Brubeck
- Released: January 1961
- Recorded: May–June 1960
- Genre: Jazz
- Label: Fantasy - 3301

Dave Brubeck chronology
Bernstein Plays Brubeck Plays Bernstein (1960)	Brubeck à la mode (1961)	Brubeck and Rushing (1960)

Brubeck à la mode is 1960 studio album by pianist Dave Brubeck and his quartet.

The album comprises compositions by the clarinetist Bill Smith; this was one of three albums that Brubeck and his quartet made with Smith.

In Todd R. Decker's 2014 book Who Should Sing Ol' Man River?: The Lives of an American Song, Decker wrote that the album cover of Brubeck à la mode shows the "...smiling quartet sharing ice cream sodas at a picture-perfect ice cream fountain". Decker wrote how the cover frames the album within the context of the contemporaneous Civil Rights Movement; especially the Greensboro sit-ins and Nashville sit-ins which also took place at lunch counters.

== Reception ==
Professional ratings
Review scores
Source	Rating
AllMusic	2/5 stars
The Penguin Guide to Jazz Recordings	3/4 stars

Scott Yanow of AllMusic wrote that "the music generally swings and there are some fine solos but none of the individual pieces are all that memorable".

Billboard magazine reviewed the album in their January 16, 1961, issue and wrote, "The music is swinging, alive and comes from Smith's pen. Brubeck plays simply and movingly on these sides as do the members of his group."

== Track listing ==
All compositions by Bill Smith except otherwise noted:

1. "Dorian Dance" – 3:28
2. "Peace, Brother" (Eddie DeLange, Jimmy Van Heusen, Bill Smith) – 3:55
3. "Invention" – 4:57
4. "Lydian Line" – 5:25
5. "Catch-Me-If-You-Can" – 1:45
6. "Frisco Fog" – 6:01
7. "The Piper" – 2:47
8. "Soliloquy" – 3:26
9. "One for the Kids" – 3:11
10. "Ballade" – 3:58

== Personnel ==
- Dave Brubeck - piano
- Bill Smith - clarinet
- Eugene Wright - double bass
- Joe Morello - drums

Technical

- Bob Willoughby - cover photography

== See also ==
- Civil rights movement in popular culture
