= Their Last Time Out =

1967 live album by Dave Brubeck, released 2011

Their Last Time Out: The Unreleased Live Concert, December 26, 1967

Live album by Dave Brubeck
- Released: 2011
- Recorded: December 26, 1967 (Pittsburgh, Pa.)
- Venue: Statler Hilton Hotel, Pittsburgh.
- Genre: Cool jazz, post bop
- Length: 1:37:58
- Label: Columbia – 88697 81562 2
- Producer: Russell Gloyd, Didier C. Deutsch

Dave Brubeck chronology
The Last Time We Saw Paris (1967)	Their Last Time Out: The Unreleased Live Concert, December 26, 1967 (2011)	Compadres (1968)

Their Last Time Out: The Unreleased Live Concert, December 26, 1967 is a 1967 live album by Dave Brubeck and his quartet, recorded in Pittsburgh, Pennsylvania on December 26, 1967. It was first released in 2011 by Columbia Records in a double CD format.

== Reception ==
Professional ratings
Review scores
Source	Rating
Allmusic	4/5 stars
Jazzwise	4/5 stars

The album was reviewed by Ken Dryden at Allmusic, who noted that the sound is in mono and was not as well-recorded as previous live releases, while commenting that the performances are of a high calibre and that Brubeck fans would welcome the album as a historic addition to the musician's discography.

Peter Vacher writing for Jazzwise describes the album's atmosphere as being "almost playful at times", characterising Brubeck's piano playing as "splashy", with a "crisp, boppish attack", commending the rhythm section of Wright and Morello for their "wonderfully lithe swing", and noting the "frail beauty" of Desmond's saxophone.

== Track listing ==
=== Disc one ===
1. "Introduction" – 0:39
2. "St. Louis Blues" (W. C. Handy) – 8:43
3. "Three to Get Ready" (Dave Brubeck) – 5:37
4. "These Foolish Things (Remind Me of You)" (Eric Maschwitz, Jack Strachey) – 10:24
5. "Cielito Lindo" (Quirino Mendoza y Cortés, arr. Dave Brubeck) – 4:57
6. "La Paloma Azul" (Traditional, arr. Dave Brubeck) – 5:20
7. "Take the "A" Train" (Billy Strayhorn) – 5:56
8. "Someday My Prince Will Come" (Larry Morey, Frank Churchill) – 6:24

=== Disc two ===
1. "Introduction of the Members of the Quartet" – 1:07
2. "Swanee River" (Stephen Foster, arr. Dave Brubeck) – 10:26
3. "I'm in a Dancing Mood" (Maurice Sigler, Al Goodhart, Al Hoffman) – 3:20
4. "You Go to My Head" (J. Fred Coots, Haven Gillespie) – 8:51
5. "Set My People Free" (Eugene Wright) – 6:30
6. "For Drummers Only" (Joe Morello) – 11:43
7. "Take Five" (Paul Desmond) – 8:18

== Personnel ==
- Dave Brubeck – piano
- Paul Desmond – alto saxophone
- Eugene Wright – bass
- Joe Morello – drums
