= Peter "Madcat" Ruth =

American harmonica player

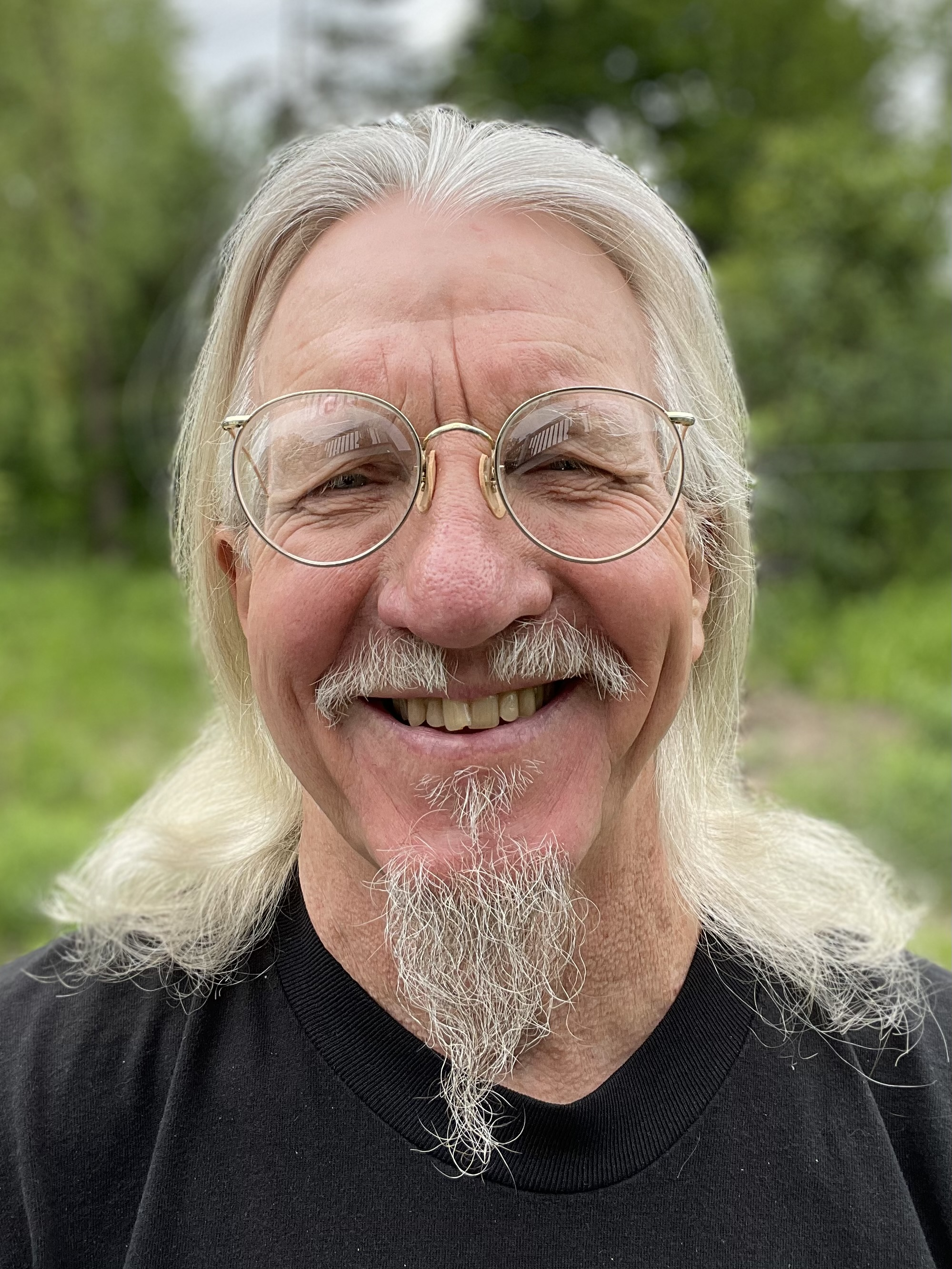
- Ruth in 2022

Background information
- Genres: Folk; blues; country; jazz
- Occupation: Musician
- Instrument: Harmonica
- Years active: 1969–present
- Website: www.petermadcatruth.com

Peter "Madcat" Ruth is an American harmonica player. Since the 1960s, he has performed across many genres, including folk, blues, jazz, and country. In 2006, Ruth won the Grammy Award for Best Classical Recording for his appearance on William Bolcom's Songs of Innocence and of Experience.

== Biography ==
=== Early life ===
Ruth became inspired to play the blues when he heard Sonny Terry and Brownie McGhee. He grew up listening to Chicago blues musicians, and he often visited Maxwell Street, and attended many shows at the Regal Theater in Chicago, as well as the University of Chicago to see artists such as James Brown, Junior Walker and the All Stars, Otis Redding, Mississippi John Hurt, Mississippi Fred McDowell, Big Joe Williams, Sleepy John Estes, Yank Rachell, Robert Pete Williams, and many others, who would become a big influence on him and his music.

In 1963, when he was a freshman in high school, he took guitar lessons at the Old Town School of Folk Music in Chicago, and at the age of 14 began playing folk/blues on guitar and harmonica around the Chicago area in his first band, a duo called The Petey-Tweety Band. At age 18, Ruth began taking harmonica lessons from Big Walter Horton.

=== Musical career ===
==== 1960s ====
In 1968 he met bassist and trombonist Chris Brubeck, son of jazz pianist Dave Brubeck, at a jam session, and Madcat told Chris to let him know if he ever needed a harmonica player. In the spring of 1969, Chris Brubeck invited Madcat to join his rock band, New Heavenly Blue, who were located in Michigan. For the next two years, Madcat played with the band during summers and on weekends while attending Lake Forest College in Illinois.

==== 1970s ====
In 1971, Ruth relocated to Ann Arbor to work full-time with New Heavenly Blue, and they recorded two albums, one for RCA Victor and another for Atlantic Records.

In 1971, Dave Brubeck wrote the cantata "Truth is Fallen", which featured New Heavenly Blue, and was performed with various orchestras, among them the Rochester Philharmonic, the Cincinnati Symphony Orchestra, and the Dallas Symphony Orchestra. New Heavenly Blue also played the music for a touring company performing Jesus Christ Superstar, with Madcat playing all of the saxophone parts on the harmonica.

When New Heavenly Blue disbanded in 1973, Madcat joined the Darius Brubeck Ensemble, a progressive jazz group led by Chris's older brother, Darius. The group was often billed as opening act for the Dave Brubeck Quartet, and at these concerts Madcat was performing with such jazz greats as Gerry Mulligan and Paul Desmond, as well as Dave Brubeck.

In 1974 when the Dave Brubeck Quartet disbanded, Dave invited Madcat to join his new group Two Generations of Brubeck, which featured Dave, and his sons Darius, Chris, and Daniel, as well as clarinetist Perry Robinson and percussionist Muruga Booker. Madcat performed with the band for the next few years, at many high-profile concerts, including an appearance at Carnegie Hall in New York City, on July 2, 1975, at the Newport Jazz Festival.

In 1974, Madcat also joined Chris Brubeck's newly formed progressive rock group, Sky King. In 1975, Sky King released the album Secret Sauce, on Columbia Records, and made an extensive U.S. tour.

==== 1980s ====
In the 1980s, Madcat went solo and began infusing the folk/blues tradition with elements of funk, rock and jazz, recording with the country rock band Blackfoot and Word Jazz vocalist Ken Nordine, as well as a wide variety of other artists. In 1987, Madcat recorded an album with Rock & Roll Hall of Fame inductee and Parliament-Funkadelic bassist Bootsy Collins.

In 1981, Madcat began a longtime association with twin brothers Sandor & Lazlo Slomovits and their band Gemini, performing music written mostly for children and families, and the resulting recordings have won a number of honors, including awards from Parents' Choice Magazine, the American Library Association, the National Parenting Publications (NAPPA), Early Childhood News, and the Wolf Trap Institute for Early Learning Through the Arts.

==== 1990s ====
In 1990, Madcat and guitarist/singer Shari Kane formed the duo Madcat & Kane. They continued to record and tour nationally and internationally until 2014. In the 1990s, Madcat Ruth also recorded with W.C. Handy Award winner Rory Block, as well as blues guitarist Catfish Keith, and folk singer Rosalie Sorrels.

In 1997 Madcat was named "Harmonica Player of the Year" by the Society for the Preservation and Advancement of the Harmonica (SPAH).

In 1998 Madcat teamed up with Chris Brubeck, and guitarist Joel Brown, to form Chris Brubeck's Triple Play, a band that he continues to perform with. That same year, he also started performing with Big Joe Manfra in Brazil, and he has completed thirteen tours in Brazil with Manfra since then.

==== 2000s ====
Ruth also recorded with George Clinton, and he appeared on the 2003 compilation 6 Degrees of P-Funk: The Best of George Clinton & His Funky Family.

In 2005, Homespun Tapes released two DVDs of harmonica techniques taught by Madcat, "Anyone Can Play Harmonica – An Easy Guide to Getting Started", and "The Ins And Outs of Rhythm Harp – Percussive Techniques for Blues Players".

In February 2006 he won the Grammy Award for "Best Classical Recording", for his performance on William Bolcom's Songs of Innocence and of Experience, recorded live at Hill Auditorium at the University of Michigan.

In 2009, Madcat was one of the featured musicians in the documentary film Pocket Full of Soul: The Harmonica Documentary, which was narrated by Huey Lewis.

==== 2010s ====
In 2014, Madcat appeared on Musician/Actor Jeff Daniels recording Days Like These.

In 2017, in honor of John Lee Hooker's 100th birthday anniversary celebration, he performed with Booker Blues All-Stars on a recording called Booker Plays Hooker. The band consists of drummer Muruga Booker, Rock and Roll Hall of Fame inductee Billy Davis (guitar & vocals), Tony "Strat" Thomas (guitar), John Sauter (bass guitar), and Misty Love (former backup singer for Kid Rock) (vocals)

Although he is always involved in many side projects and special guest appearances, Madcat currently plays with Peter Madcat Ruth's C.A.R.Ma. Quartet, with Chris Brubeck's Triple Play, and with The Schrock Brothers Band.
