= Jack Reilly (musician) =

American jazz pianist (1932–2018)

- Born: Jack Aloysius Reilly; January 1, 1932; Staten Island, New York
- Died: May 18, 2018 (aged 86) Toms River, New Jersey
- Genres: Jazz, classical
- Occupation: Musician
- Instrument: Piano
- Years active: 1948–2018
- Labels: Unichrom, Revelation, Borderline
- Website: jackreillyjazz.com

Jack Aloysius Reilly (also known as Sean Petrahn) (January 1, 1932 – May 18, 2018) was an American jazz pianist.

== Career ==
Reilly was born in Staten Island, New York. At age 7, he began classical piano and gave his first recital while still in grammar school. During his teens, he formed a jazz band in high school. This proved to be pivotal in his choice of Jazz as the major musical force in his life. He played in a U.S. Navy band while stationed in Puerto Rico from 1951 to 1953 and it was there that he met Bill Evans. After military duty, Jack received a four year scholarship to the Manhattan School of Music majoring in piano and composition. At school he met many musicians of note who had also been in the military; people like Bill Russo, Phil Woods, Zoot Sims, John Lewis, John LaPorta, and Hall Overton. John LaPorta hired Jack to perform at the Newport Jazz Festival in 1958, the year he graduated from MSM. The critics gave high praise for the quartets performance and raves for Reilly's playing. During this time he also worked with Warren Covington, George Russell, Lennie Tristano, and Jerry Wald. He moved to California briefly in the mid-1960s to study Indian classical music with Ali Akbar Khan, and returned to Manhattan where he composed the large-scale piece Requiem Mass for Chorus and Jazz Quartet. This work was performed in New York with Sheila Jordan, Jack Six, Norman Marnell, Joe Cocuzzo, and the contemporary chorale with Carol Lian conducting.

In 1967, Reilly presented an entire evening of his works (solo, trio) at Carnegie Recital Hall. The New York Times reviewed the concert and singled out Reilly's Liturgical Jazz (The Psalms, sung by Sheila Jordan) as being original, exciting and a true synthesis of the blues and classical music. A second choral work was commissioned by the National Endowment for the Arts, Washington, D.C. It is titled "The Light of The Soul", an oratorio with the Jersey City State Concert Choir conducted by George Hansler and soloists Sherry Kozinsky, Karen Sozio, Theresa Fico, Esther Bell, and Marc Bellson, and Dan Lincoln, reader. The jazz musicians included Jimmy Giuffre (flute and tenor sax), Jack Six (bass), and Joe Cocuzzo (drums).

Reilly served on the faculties of New York University, Berklee College of Music, The Mannes College of Music, and the New School for Social Research. He was chairman of the Department of Jazz Studies at the New England Conservatory of Music as well as the Jazz Program at La Musica A Villa Scarsella in Diano Marina, Italy. Reilly presented lecture/recitals at numerous universities in Europe and in North America including a presentation at the prestigious International Piano Festival and Competition at the University of Maryland.

Reilly died on May 18, 2018, at the age of 86.

== Discography ==
- Tributes (Carousel, 1976)
- Marco Di Marco/Jack Reilly (Modern Jazz, 1980)
- November (Revelation 1983)
- Blue-Sean-Green (Unichrom, 1994)
- The Brinksman (Unichrom, 1994)
- Masks (Unichrom, 1998)
- Here's What I Like! (Unichrom, 1994)
- Tzu-Jan the Sound of the Tarot Vol. 1 (Unichrom, 2000)
- Tzu-Jan the Sound of the Tarot Vol. 2 (Unichrom, 2000)
- Pure Passion (Unichrom, 2002)
- Live in Poland (Unichrom, 2002)
- November (Progressive, 2003)
- Innocence: Green Spring Suite (Unichrom, 2007)

== Compositions and books ==
- A Jazz Requiem – For jazz quintet, jazz vocal soloist, and 62 voice mixed chorus
- Chuang–Tzu – Theme and 8 variations for symphony orchestra
- Concertino – For solo jazz piano (trio optional) with string orchestra
- Concerto for Chromatic Harmonica and Strings
- Orbitals – Concerto for jazz piano trio and symphony orchestra in one movement
- Species Blues – Volume 1 "The Blues Form", Volume 2 "The Song Form", Volume 3 "The Free Form". This is a complete course on the "How" for jazz piano.
- The Harmony of Bill Evans – Volumes 1 & 2. As a musician, Reilly believed Evans to be a musician on the highest plane of consciousness. As an author, Reilly chose to analyze Evans' compositions in order to reveal the depth and richness of them.
- The Harmony of Dave Brubeck – Reilly wrote that Dave Brubeck had been an inspiration to him since the mid–fifties and expressed his gratitude to him for the many beautiful compositions he gave the world.
- The Light of the Soul – Oratorio for narrator, 10 piece jazz ensemble, mixed choir and vocal soloists based on the yoga sutras of Patangeli
- The Silence of the One – 24 piano pieces in all 24 keys
