= Jack Six =

US-american jazz musician

Jack Six (July 26, 1930 – March 14, 2015) was an American jazz double-bassist and composer.

Six was born in Danville, Illinois, and initially learned trumpet as a teenager before switching to bass. He studied at Juilliard in 1955–1956, then played in several big bands, including the Tommy Dorsey band after Dorsey's death (under Warren Covington's direction) and the bands of Claude Thornhill and Woody Herman. In the first half of the 1960s he played with Don Elliott, Jimmy Raney, Kenny Davern, The Dukes of Dixieland, and Herbie Mann; he continued working with Davern alongside Dick Wellstood as the house band for the Ferryboat, a club in Brielle, New Jersey. He became a member of Dave Brubeck's ensemble in 1968, remaining with Brubeck until 1974, and also played with Tal Farlow during this time. In the 1970s he worked with Illinois Jacquet and Jay McShann, among others. He directed musical events at a casino in Atlantic City in the early 1980s and recorded with Susannah McCorkle and Jack Reilly; later that decade he returned to Brubeck's ensemble, remaining with him until he retired in the 1990s.

== Discography ==
With Dave Brubeck

- Blues Roots (Columbia, 1968)
- Compadres (Columbia, 1968)
- The Gates of Justice (Decca, 1969)
- Dave Brubeck Trio with Gerry Mulligan & the Cincinnati Symphony Orchestra (MCA, 1971)
- Summit Sessions (Columbia, 1971)
- The Last Set at Newport (Atlantic, 1972)
- We're All Together Again for the First Time (Atlantic, 1973)
- Live at the Berlin Philharmonie (CBS, 1973)
- All the Things We Are (Atlantic, 1976)
- Quiet as the Moon (MusicMasters, 1991)
- Once When I Was Very Young (MusicMasters, 1992)
- Late Night Brubeck (Telarc, 1994)
- Young Lions & Old Tigers (Telarc, 1995)
- Nightshift (Telarc, 1995)
- To Hope! A Celebration (Telarc, 1996)
- So What's New? (Telarc, 1998)
- Double Live from the USA & UK (Telarc, 2001)

With Herbie Mann

- Herbie Mann's African Suite (United Artists, 1959)
- My Kinda Groove (Atlantic, 1965)
- The Beat Goes On (Atlantic, 1967)

With Jack Reilly

- Blue-Sean-Green (Unichrom, 1994)
- Masks (Unichrom, 1998)
- November (Progressive, 2003)

With others

- Tommy Dorsey, The Tommy Dorsey Orchestra (Brunswick, 1958)
- Dukes of Dixieland, We Gotta Shout! (CBS, 1963)
- Tal Farlow, The Return of Tal Farlow (Prestige, 1970)
- Tal Farlow, Guitar Player (Prestige, 1974)
- Benny Goodman, Live Down Under 1973 (Jazz Band 1997)
- Marty Grosz, I Hope Gabriel Likes My Music (Aviva, 1982)
- Woody Herman, 1954 and 1959 (Status, 1996)
- Illinois Jacquet, Birthday Party Vol. 2 (JRC, 1976)
- Susannah McCorkle, Over the Rainbow (Jazz Alliance, 1996)
- Jay McShann, The Big Apple Bash (Atlantic, 1979)
- Gerry Mulligan, Watching & Waiting (DRG, 1999)
- Gerry Mulligan, The Complete 1972 Berlin Concert (Jazz Row, 2009)
- Richard Peaslee, Passage (Linear B 1980)
- Dave Pike, Manhattan Latin (Decca, 1964)
- Nutty Squirrels, The Nutty Squirrels (Hanover, 1959)
- Francis Thorne, Irving Berlin Songs (CRI, 1988)
- Francis Thorne, Porter On My Mind (CRI, 1990)
