= Bill Smith (jazz musician) =

American clarinetist and composer (1926–2020)

- Also known as: William O. Smith
- Born: William Overton Smith; September 22, 1926; Sacramento, California, U.S.
- Origin: Oakland, California, U.S.
- Died: February 29, 2020 (aged 93) Seattle, Washington, U.S.
- Genres: Jazz, classical, third stream
- Instruments: Clarinet

William Overton Smith (September 22, 1926 – February 29, 2020) was an American clarinetist and composer. He worked extensively in modern classical music, third stream and jazz, and was perhaps best known for having played with pianist Dave Brubeck intermittently from the 1940s to the early 2000s. Smith frequently recorded jazz under the name Bill Smith, but his classical compositions are credited under the name William O. Smith.

== Early life and education ==
Smith was born in Sacramento and grew up in Oakland, California, where he began playing clarinet at the age of ten. He put together a jazz group to play for dances at 13, and at the age of 15 he joined the Oakland Symphony. He idolized Benny Goodman, but after high school, a brief cross-country tour with a dance band ended his romance for the life of a traveling jazz musician. He gave two weeks' notice when the band reached Washington, D.C. Encouraged by an older band member, Smith moved to New York.

He began his formal music studies at the Juilliard School, playing in New York jazz clubs like Kelly's Stables at night. Uninspired by the Juilliard faculty, he returned to California upon hearing and admiring the music of Darius Milhaud, who was then teaching at Mills College in Oakland. At Mills, Smith met pianist Dave Brubeck, with whom he often played until Brubeck's 2012 death. Smith was a member of the Dave Brubeck Octet, and later occasionally subbed for saxophonist Paul Desmond in the Dave Brubeck Quartet. Brubeck's 1960 albums The Riddle and Brubeck à la mode featured Smith performing his own compositions with Brubeck's quartet. Smith rejoined Brubeck's group in the 1990s. He studied composition with Roger Sessions at the University of California, Berkeley, where he was graduated with a bachelor's and a master's degree.

== Career ==
Winning the Prix de Paris presented Smith the opportunity for two years of study at the Paris Conservatory, and in 1957, he was awarded the prestigious Prix de Rome and spent six years in that city. He has since received numerous other awards, including two Guggenheim grants.

After a teaching stint at the University of Southern California, Smith began a thirty-year career at the University of Washington School of Music in Seattle, where he taught music composition and performance, co-leading the forward-thinking Contemporary Group, first with Robert Suderburg, and then with trombonist Stuart Dempster, from 1966 to 1997.

In 1947, Smith composed Schizophrenic Scherzo for the Brubeck Octet, one of the earliest works that successfully integrated jazz and classical techniques, a style that later was given the name "third stream" by Gunther Schuller.

Smith investigated and cataloged a wide range of extended techniques on the clarinet, including the use of two clarinets simultaneously by a single performer, inspired by images of the ancient aulos encountered during a trip to Greece, numerous multiphonics, playing the instrument with a cork in the bell, and the "clar-flute," a technique that involves removing the instrument's mouthpiece and playing it as an end-blown flute. As William O. Smith, he wrote several pioneering pieces that feature many of these techniques, including Duo for Flute and Clarinet (1961) and Variants for Solo Clarinet (1963). In an article titled "Contemporary Clarinet Sonorities" (Selmer Bandwagon no. 67, fall 1972, pp. 12–14), Smith compiled the first comprehensive catalogue of fingerings for clarinet multiphonics. He was among the early composers interested in electronic music, and as a performer he continued to experiment with amplified clarinet and electronic delays. He remained active nationally, internationally, and on the local Seattle music scene until well into his 90s. In 2008, he composed, recorded, and premiered a "jazzopera" (his preferred term) titled Space in the Heart.

== Personal life ==
Smith had four children. He died at age 93 in his home from complications of prostate cancer on February 29, 2020.

== Awards and honors ==
- Prix de Paris
- Phelan Award
- 1958 Rome Prize
- 1960 Guggenheim Fellowship (John Simon Guggenheim Memorial Foundation 2010)
- A Fromm Players Fellowship
- National Academy of Arts and Letters Award
- BMI Jazz Pioneer Award
- International Clarinet Association Honorary Membership

== Works ==
- Concerto for Clarinet and Combo (recorded with Shelly Manne)
- Schizophrenic Scherzo, for clarinet, alto saxophone, tenor saxophone, trumpet, and trombone (1947)
- Concerto for trombone and chamber orchestra (1959)
- Five Pieces for Solo Clarinet (1959)
- Duo, for clarinet and tape (1960)
- Five Pieces, for flute and clarinet (1961)
- Concerto for Jazz Soloist and Orchestra (1962)
- Variants, for solo clarinet (1963)
- Mosaic, for clarinet and piano (1964)
- Random Suite, for clarinet and tape (1965)
- Quadri, for jazz ensemble and orchestra (1968)
- Chronos, for string quartet (1975)
- Five, for brass quintet (1976)
- Five Fragments, for double clarinet (1977)
- Intermission, for soprano, SATB choir, and various instruments (1978)
- Musing, for 3 clarinets and optional dancers (1983)
- Illuminated Manuscript, for wind quintet and computer graphics (1987)
- Jazz Set, for violin and wind quintet (1991)
- Epitaphs, for double clarinet (1993)
- Ritual, for double clarinet (two clarinets, one player), tape, and projections (1993)
- Soli, for flute, clarinet, violin, and cello (1993)
- Five Pages, for 2 clarinets and computer (1994)
- Duet in Two Tempos, for 2 clarinets (1996)
- Explorations, for clarinet and chamber orchestra (1998)

== Discography ==
=== As leader ===
- String Quartet/Capriccio for Violin & Piano/Suite for Violin & Clarinet (Stereo, 1958)
- Folk Jazz (Contemporary, 1961)
- New Dimensions with the American Jazz Ensemble (Epic, 1962)
- The American Jazz Ensemble in Rome: New Sounds...Old World (RCA Victor, 1962)
- Four Chamber Works (Contemporary, 1963)
- Two Sides of Bill Smith (CRI, 1974)
- Sonorities (Edipan, 1978)
- Colours (Edipan, 1983)
- William O. Smith (Edipan, 1990)
- Solo Music (Ravenna Editions, 2001)
- Bill Smith Meets Gianmarco Lanza (Helikonia Jazz, 2004)
- Concert for Mirella (Mox Jazz, 2005)

=== As sideman ===
With Dave Brubeck

- Dave Brubeck Octet (Fantasy, 1956) (Tracks recorded 1946–50)
- The Riddle (Columbia, 1960)
- Brubeck à la mode (Fantasy, 1960)
- Near Myth (Fantasy, 1961)
- Concord On a Summer Night (Concord Jazz, 1982)
- For Iola (Concord Jazz, 1985)
- Reflections (Concord Jazz, 1986)
- Blue Rondo (Concord Jazz, 1987)
- Moscow Night (Concord Jazz, 1988)
- New Wine (MusicMasters, 1990)
- Once When I Was Very Young (MusicMasters, 1992)
- Nightshift (Telarc, 1995)

With others

- Milton Babbitt, New Music for Virtuosos (New World, 1977)
- William Bergsma, String Quartet No. 4/Illegible Canons for Clarinet and Percussion/Fantastic Variations On a Theme from Tristan (Musical Heritage Society, 1977)
- Anthony Braxton, Composition No. 96 (Leo, 1989)
- Tom Collier, Impulsive Illuminations (Origin, 2016)
- Deep Listening Band, The Ready Made Boomerang (New Albion, 1991)
- Harold Farberman, Dedicated to Dolphy (Cambridge, 1966)
- Barney Kessel, Carmen (Contemporary, 1959)
- Gail Kubik, Divertimenti I & II/Sonatina for Piano & Sonatina for Clarinet & Piano (Contemporary, 1964)
- Shelly Manne, Concerto for Clarinet & Combo (Contemporary, 1957)
- Luigi Nono, Sofferte Onde Serene/A Floresta e Jovem e Cheja de Vida (Deutsche Grammophon, 1979)
- Luigi Nono, Voices of Protest (Mode, 2000)
- Red Norvo, Music to Listen to Red Norvo By (Contemporary, 1957)
- Pauline Oliveros, Deep Listening (New Albion, 1989)
