= A Dave Brubeck Christmas =

Studio album by Dave Brubeck
- Released: Sep 17, 1996
- Recorded: June 6 and 8, 1996
- Studio: Ambient Recording Studio; Stamford, Connecticut, U.S.
- Genre: Jazz, Christmas music
- Length: 55:28
- Label: Telarc Jazz Tone #83410
- Producer: John Snyder, Russell Gloyd

Professional ratings
Review scores
Source	Rating
AllMusic	4.5/5 stars
The Encyclopedia of Popular Music	1/5 stars
The Penguin Guide to Jazz Recordings	3/4 stars

A Dave Brubeck Christmas is an album by Dave Brubeck, released in 1996 on Telarc.

== Recording ==
A collection of solo piano pieces, the album was recorded at Ambient Recording Studio in Stamford, Connecticut, between June 6 and 8, 1996. Brubeck also contributed the album's liner notes.

In addition to several Christmas classics, Brubeck included two original compositions, "Run, Run, Run to Bethlehem" and "To Us Is Given."

== Reception ==
In his review, Ken Dryden of AllMusic called "Joy to the World" and "Winter Wonderland" "treasures" and stated that the entire CD is "worth repeated hearings." The album made the top 10 on Billboard's Top Jazz Albums chart, and was listed among the best-selling jazz albums of 1997.

The album peaked at #3 on the Billboard Top Jazz Albums chart.

== Track listing ==
No.	Title	Length
1.	""Homecoming" Jingle Bells"	3:20
2.	"Santa Claus Is Coming To Town"	3:38
3.	"Joy to the World"	2:53
4.	"Away in a Manger"	5:03
5.	"Winter Wonderland"	4:19
6.	"O Little Town of Bethlehem"	5:34
7.	"What Child Is This? (Greensleeves)"	3:27
8.	"To Us Is Given"	3:32
9.	"O Tannenbaum"	3:35
10.	"Silent Night"	4:53
11.	"Cantos Para Pedir las Posadas"	3:59
12.	"Run, Run, Run to Bethlehem"	3:48
13.	""Farewell" Jingle Bells"	2:59
14.	"The Christmas Song"	4:28

== Personnel ==
- Dave Brubeck – piano

=== Production ===
- Tom Bender - technical assistance
- Anilda Carrasquillo - art direction, cover design
- Russell Gloyd, John Snyder - producer
- Kenneth Hamann - engineer
- Elaine Martone - production supervisor
- Tom McCluskey - editing
- Jack Renner - engineer
- Robert Woods - executive producer
