= Jazz at Oberlin =

Live album by Dave Brubeck Quartet
- Released: 1953
- Recorded: March 2, 1953; Oberlin College, Oberlin
- Genre: Jazz
- Length: 37:47
- Label: Fantasy; F 3245 (album) OJCCD-046-2 (CD)

Dave Brubeck Quartet chronology
The Dave Brubeck Quartet (1952)	Jazz at Oberlin (1953)	Jazz at the College of the Pacific (1953)

Professional ratings
Review scores
Source	Rating
Allmusic	4/5 stars
The Penguin Guide to Jazz Recordings	4/4 stars

Jazz at Oberlin is a live album by the Dave Brubeck Quartet. It was recorded in the Finney Chapel at Oberlin College in March 1953, and released on Fantasy Records as F 3245. The Fantasy Records album back cover states that drummer Lloyd Davis had a 103-degree fever during the performance.

Critic Nat Hentoff wrote in Down Beat magazine that the album ranks with the College of the Pacific and Storyville sets "as the best of Brubeck on record", and jazz critic Gary Giddins has written that it would "make many short lists of the decade's outstanding albums".

The concert is credited with making jazz a legitimate field of musical study at Oberlin, and furthermore initiating it as a subject of serious intellectual attention; Wendell Logan, the chair of Oberlin's Jazz Studies Department, described it as "the watershed event that signaled the change of performance space for jazz from the nightclub to the concert hall".

In addition, it was one of the early works in the cool jazz stream of jazz; The Guardian's John Fordham wrote in 2010 that it "indicated new directions for jazz that didn't slavishly mirror bebop, and even hinted at free-jazz piano techniques still years away from realisation"; he further observed that it "marked Brubeck's eager adoption by America's (predominantly white) youth – a welcome that soon extended around the world ... for a rhythmically intricate instrumental jazz".

The album was given 24-bit remastering and reissued in 2010 as part of the Concord label's Original Jazz Classics (OJC) Remasters series. Fordham remarked on "The enthusiasm of the college audience, audible throughout the album".

== Track listing ==
1. "These Foolish Things (Remind Me of You)" (Holt Marvell, Jack Strachey, Harry Link) 6:25
2. "Perdido" (Juan Tizol, Hans Lengsfelder, Ervin Drake) 8:03
3. "Stardust" (Hoagy Carmichael, Mitchell Parish) 6:32
4. "The Way You Look Tonight" (Jerome Kern, Dorothy Fields) 7:43
5. "How High the Moon" (Nancy Hamilton, Morgan Lewis) 9:04

(Times are as given on the CD; the album numbers differ slightly.)

The 10" LP and reel-to-reel version of the album did not include "How High the Moon" and reordered the remaining tracks in a different way. Also, it includes the full version of "The Way You Look Tonight" with Paul Desmond's full solo.

Side A

1. "Perdido" (Juan Tizol, Hans Lengsfelder, Ervin Drake)
2. "Stardust" (Hoagy Carmichael, Mitchell Parish)

Side B

1. "These Foolish Things (Remind Me of You)" (Holt Marvell, Jack Strachey, Harry Link)
2. "The Way You Look Tonight" (Jerome Kern, Dorothy Fields)

== Personnel ==
- Dave Brubeck - piano
- Paul Desmond - alto saxophone
- Lloyd Davis - drums
- Ron Crotty - bass
