= Ron Crotty =

American double-bassist (1929–2015)

- Born: Ronald O Crotty; December 31, 1929; San Francisco, California, U.S.
- Died: May 7, 2015 (aged 85) Berkeley, California, U.S.
- Genres: Jazz; Bebop
- Occupations: Musician, composer
- Instrument: Double bass
- Labels: Fantasy Records
- Formerly of: Dave Brubeck; Vince Guaraldi

Ron Crotty (December 31, 1929 – May 7, 2015), born Ronald O Crotty in San Francisco, raised in Oakland, and was an American jazz bassist. He became known in the late 1940s and early 1950s for work with pianists Dave Brubeck and Vince Guaraldi. He had a younger sister, Anne Crotty Dapper Wells (b.1932, d. 2010)), who died before him in Sidney, British Columbia.

== Career ==
Crotty played the violin and sang as a child in the church choir. When the school orchestra needed a bass player, he started to master this instrument. He was gripped by the bebop and went to San Francisco State University to teach. He played in a bebop band with, among others, Al Molina and met Cal Tjader, who later recommended him to Dave Brubeck when the pianist wanted to start a trio. His work with Brubeck was interrupted by his military service. He was drafted into the Army during the Korean War.

After two years, Crotty returned to Brubeck, now in his quartet with Paul Desmond and Lloyd Davis which became famous with the album Jazz at Oberlin (1953). After a year, he left Brubeck due to hepatitis and returned to San Francisco after years of touring, where his music career was ruined by alcohol and amphetamine addiction. During his time in San Francisco, he performed with pianist Vince Guaraldi and guitarist Eddie Duran and appeared as the Ron Crotty Trio on Modern Music from San Francisco (1956).

Crotty also worked odd jobs on the side to supplement his income. He finally beat his addictions in 1997.

Crotty played regularly in the Oakland Museum café for years, with valve trombonist Frank Phipps and guitarist Tony Corman and other Bay Area jazz musicians. He also had his own group, Ron Crotty & Friends, with which he performed in San Francisco and the surrounding area. A trio album with Phipps and Corman was released in 2009.

Crotty married Joan Joaquin in San Francisco on November 25, 1950. They were divorced within 2 years.

== Death ==
Crotty died in Berkeley, California, on May 7, 2015.

== Discography ==
- Crotty, Corman and Phipps (2009)

=== With Dave Brubeck ===
- Brubeck Trio with Cal Tjader Vol. 1 & 2 (1950)
- Jazz at Oberlin (1953)
- Live in Concert (2002)
- At Welshire Ebell: the Historic 1953 Los Angeles Concert (2006)

Jazz at College of the Pacific. Released 1954

=== With Vince Guaraldi ===
- Modern Music from San Francisco (1956)
