= Dick Collins =

American jazz trumpeter

Richard Harrison Collins (July 19, 1924 – April 19, 2016) was an American jazz trumpeter.

Collins was born in Seattle on July 19, 1924. Several of his parents and grandparents were professional musicians. Collins attended Mills College in 1946–47, where he studied music formally under Darius Milhaud, and moved with Milhaud to Paris for the next academic year. As a student at Mills, he first met Dave Brubeck, and while in Paris he played with Hubert Fol and Kenny Clarke. Once he returned to California, he began playing with Brubeck in his Bay Area-based octet, then completed his bachelor's degree in music at San Francisco State College. In the 1950s he performed and recorded with Charlie Barnet, Charlie Mariano, Nat Pierce, Paul Desmond, Cal Tjader, and Woody Herman. In 1957 he began working with Les Brown, an association that continued for nearly a decade and included worldwide tours.

In 1965, Collins took a position as a music librarian, which he held through 1967, and took a second position from 1971 to 1986, mostly receding from active performance. In later years, he still occasionally performed live or recorded, including with Nat Pierce, Mary Ann McCall, and Woody Herman. He died in Hesperia, California on April 19, 2016, at the age of 91.
