= Dave Brubeck and Jay & Kai at Newport =

Live album by Dave Brubeck Quartet / J. J. Johnson-Kai Winding Quintet
- Released: 1956
- Recorded: July 6, 1956
- Venues: Newport Jazz Festival, Newport
- Genre: Jazz
- Length: 44:15
- Label: Columbia
- Producer: George Avakian

Dave Brubeck chronology
Brubeck Plays Brubeck (1956)	Dave Brubeck and Jay & Kai at Newport (1956)	Jazz Impressions of the U.S.A. (1957)

J. J. Johnson and Kai Winding chronology
Jay and Kai + 6 (1956)	Dave Brubeck and Jay & Kai at Newport (1956)	Jay and Kai (1957)

Dave Brubeck and Jay & Kai at Newport is a split live album featuring selections from Dave Brubeck's Quartet with Paul Desmond and the J. J. Johnson/Kai Winding Quintet performances at the 1956 Newport Jazz Festival which was released on the Columbia label.

== Critical reception ==
Professional ratings
Review scores
Source	Rating
Allmusic	2.5/5 stars
Billboard	(positive)

Allmusic awarded the album 2½ stars and stated "Overall, this album gives one a good look at two of the most popular jazz groups of 1956".

== Track listing ==
1. "In Your Own Sweet Way" (Dave Brubeck) - 9:31
2. "Two Part Contention" (Brubeck) - 11:11
3. "Take the "A" Train" (Billy Strayhorn) - 6:04
4. "I'm in a Dancing Mood" (Al Goodhart, Al Hoffman, Maurice Sigler) - 4:36
5. "Lover, Come Back to Me" (Sigmund Romberg, Oscar Hammerstein II) - 5:32
6. "True Blue Tromboniums" (Kai Winding) - 4:17
7. "NWPT" (J. J. Johnson) - 3:04

== Personnel ==
=== Tracks 1–4 ===
- Dave Brubeck – piano
- Paul Desmond – alto saxophone
- Norman Bates – bass
- Joe Dodge – drums

=== Tracks 5–7 ===
- J. J. Johnson, Kai Winding – trombone, trombonium
- Dick Katz – piano
- Bill Crow – bass
- Rudy Collins – drums
