= Jazz at the College of the Pacific =

Live album by Dave Brubeck Quartet
- Released: Between January and September 1954
- Recorded: December 14, 1953; College of the Pacific, Stockton
- Genre: Jazz
- Length: 40:23
- Label: Fantasy; F 3223

Professional ratings
Review scores
Source	Rating
AllMusic	4.5/5 stars
The Encyclopedia of Popular Music	4/5 stars
The Penguin Guide to Jazz Recordings	3/4 stars
The Rolling Stone Album Guide	4/5 stars

Jazz at the College of the Pacific is a live album by Dave Brubeck Quartet. It was recorded and released in December 1953 on Fantasy Records as F 3223. The cover was designed by Ed Colker and drawn by Arnold Roth. Critic Nat Hentoff wrote in Down Beat magazine that the album "ranks with the Oberlin and Storyville sets as the best of Brubeck on record".

Fantasy released seven additional performances from this concert in 2002 on the album Jazz at the College of the Pacific, Vol. 2.

== Track listing ==
1. "All the Things You Are" (Jerome Kern, Oscar Hammerstein II) 9:12
2. "Laura" (David Raksin, Johnny Mercer) 3:12
3. "Lullaby in Rhythm" (Walter Hirsch, Benny Goodman) 7:25
4. "I'll Never Smile Again" (Ruth Lowe) 5:28
5. "I Remember You" (Victor Schertzinger, Johnny Mercer) 9:12
6. "For All We Know" (J. Fred Coots, Sam M. Lewis) 5:52

== Personnel ==
- Dave Brubeck - piano
- Paul Desmond - alto saxophone
- Ron Crotty - bass
- Joe Dodge - drums
