= Brubeck Plays Brubeck =

Studio album by Dave Brubeck
- Released: July 16, 1956
- Recorded: April 18–19, 1956
- Studio: Dave Brubeck's House, Oakland
- Genre: Jazz
- Length: 36:00
- Label: Columbia
- Producer: George Avakian

Dave Brubeck chronology
Jazz: Red Hot and Cool (1955)	Brubeck Plays Brubeck (1956)	Dave Brubeck and Jay & Kai at Newport (1956)

Professional ratings
Review scores
Source	Rating
Allmusic	3/5 stars
The Penguin Guide to Jazz	3.5/4 stars

Brubeck Plays Brubeck is a jazz album by pianist Dave Brubeck. The cover features design by S. Neil Fujita.

== Track listing ==
All compositions by Brubeck.

1. "Swing Bells" 3:39
2. "Walkin' Line" 2:47
3. "In Your Own Sweet Way" 5:01
4. "Two-Part Contention" 5:39
5. "Weep No More" 3:59
6. "The Duke" 2:54
7. "When I Was Young" 3:19
8. "One Moment Worth Years" 4:55
9. "The Waltz" 3:49

Tracks 1, 2, 3, 5, 7, 8 and 9 recorded on April 18, 1956; tracks 4 and 6 recorded on April 19.

== Personnel ==
- Dave Brubeck - piano
