= Chris Brubeck =

American jazz musician

Christopher William Brubeck (born March 19, 1952) is an American musician and composer, both in jazz and classical music. As a musician, he mainly plays bass guitar, bass trombone, and piano. The son of jazz pianist and composer Dave Brubeck, he joined his father and brothers Darius and Daniel in 1972 to form the New Brubeck Quartet. He later formed the Brubeck Brothers Quartet.

== Biography ==
In his youth, Brubeck took lessons in piano and trombone before teaching himself bass guitar. He graduated from Interlochen Arts Academy. In the early 1970s, he was a member of the rock bands Heavenly Blue and Sky King, but played jazz with his brothers on two albums with guitarist Larry Coryell. This was followed by a trio album with Andy LaVerne. Until 1999, much of his career was spent with folk singer Bill Crofut. Brubeck then led the Brubeck Brothers Quartet, with Dan Brubeck, and Triple Play, with Joel Brown and Peter Madcat Ruth. Beyond performing and recording as a musician, Brubeck has written lyrics for ballads and for his father's numbers such as "Blue Rondo a la Turk" and "Unsquare Dance". He has composed musicals and a concerto for trombone and orchestra.

On September 30, 2023, the Memphis Symphony Orchestra performed the debut of Brubeck's composition, "Confluence: Double Concerto for Classical Guitar, Blues Guitar & Orchestra." The performance featured guitarists Thomas Flippin and Vasti Jackson.

== Discography ==
- Two Generations of Brubeck (Atlantic, 1974)
- A Cut Above (Direct Disk Labs, 1978)
- Live at Montreux (Tomato, 1978)
- See How It Feels (Blackhawk, 1986)
- Unsquare Dance with Bill Crofut (Albany, 1991)
- Red, White, & Blues with Bill Crofut (Albany, 1992)
- Trio Brubeck (Jazz Heritage, 1994)
- Across Your Dreams with Bill Crofut (Crofut, 1995)
- Second Nature (Blue Forest, 2000)
- Bach to Brubeck (Koch, 2000)
- Triple Play Live (Blue Forest, 2000)
- Watching the World (Blue Forest, 2003)
- Convergence with the Czech National Symphony (Koch, 2005)
- Classified (Koch, 2008)
- Live at Arthur Zankel Music Center (Blue Forest, 2011)
- Lifetimes (Blue Forest, 2012)
- Timelines (Blue Forests, 2018)

== Sources ==
- Chris Brubeck biography at his website
- Chris Brubeck biography at his agency
