= Norman Bates (musician) =

American jazz musician

Norman Louis Bates (August 26, 1927, Boise, Idaho – 29 January 2004) was an American jazz double-bass player.

Bates was the brother of Bob Bates. He played in Jimmy Dorsey's band in 1945-46 and with Raymond Scott and Carmen Cavallaro shortly thereafter. In 1948 he played in a trio with Dave Brubeck, and in 1949 with Paul Desmond. He recorded with Jack Sheedy's Dixieland Jazz Band in 1950. After spending four years in the Air Force, Bates played with Wally Rose's Dixieland Band in 1955 and then replaced his brother Bob Bates in Brubeck's quartet, playing on multiple albums from Dave Brubeck and Jay & Kai at Newport (1956) onwards. He also recorded with Desmond's group again in 1956. In 1957 he left Brubeck, and led a trio in San Francisco.
