= David Van Kriedt =

American jazz musician

Dave Van Kriedt, c. 1975

David Van Kriedt (June 19, 1922 – September 29, 1994) was a composer, saxophonist and music teacher.

While Dave Brubeck (1920–2012) and Paul Desmond (1924–1977) became world jazz celebrities, the musician responsible for establishing their partnership was American tenor saxophonist, composer, and arranger David Van Kriedt.

== Career ==
Van Kriedt was born in Berkeley, California. He spent three years at Mills College in Oakland, California, studying composition with Darius Milhaud (1892–1974) and with fellow students formed the Jazz Workshop Ensemble. Later they became known as The Eight, then the Dave Brubeck Octet. Mills College in 1946 was where eight young music students recorded Dave Brubeck's Curtain Music. The personnel for the Octet was, Brubeck – piano; Paul Desmond - alto saxophone; Dave Van Kriedt - tenor saxophone; Bill Smith - clarinet; Dick Collins - trumpet; Bob Collins - trombone; Jack Weeks - bass; Cal Tjader - drums.

The octet played only a few concerts in three years, as club owners were scared by the advanced non-commercial music. In three years at both San Francisco State and Mills College, van Kriedt became proficient in voice and practically every instrument. Van Kriedt was the most influential contributor to The Octet, composing the majority of originals and arranging the standards for it. In 1951 when Russian composer Igor Stravinsky was lecturing at U.C.L.A., he used van Kriedt's composition "Fugue on Bop Themes" to demonstrate counterpoint.

In 1950 Van Kriedt, the Brubecks, Cal Tjader and Jack Weeks moved to Honolulu for some time before going their own separate ways once again.

In 1948 while still a Mills College student, Van Kriedt ventured to France, where he recorded with Kenny Clarke's Be Bop Minstrels. Van Kriedt had the opportunity to play with guitarist Django Reinhardt. Van Kriedt traveled to Norway to meet some family members and learned that his maternal grandfather, Ollie Clausen, an organist, had given music lessons to Edvard Grieg (1843 –1907). Returning to Mills College in 1952, Van Kriedt won first prize in graduate composition.

== Stan Kenton Band ==
In 1955 Van Kriedt joined The Stan Kenton band on tenor saxophone and during his nine months with the band recorded one of Kenton's most definitive albums Contemporary Concepts, featuring arrangements by Bill Holman and one by Gerry Mulligan. In this band Van Kriedt played with musicians including Bill Perkins – tenor sax; Lennie Niehaus and Charlie Mariano - both alto sax; Don Davidson – baritone sax; Carl Fontana - Bob Fitzpatrick – Kent Larson - Gus Chappell – Don Kelly - trombones; Ed Leddy - Bobby Clark - Al Porcino – Sam Noto – Stu Williamson – trumpets; Ralph Blaze - guitar; Max Bennett – bass and Mel Lewis – drums. The album was recorded at Universal Studios in Chicago on July 22, 1955. Van Kriedt toured throughout the United States and Canada and was the featured arranger with the band, appearing at jazz clubs such as the Blue Note in Chicago and Birdland in New York City.

== Dave Brubeck Reunion ==
The 1957 Dave Brubeck's album Reunion was a quintet session featuring eight Van Kriedt compositions: "Strolling", "Shouts", "Prelude", "Divertimento", "Chorale", "Leo's Place", "Darien Mode" and "Pieta". Reunion features a full–voiced Van Kriedt on Tenor (with hand towel in sax bell, to mute his huge sound). Paul Desmond – alto; Brubeck – piano; Norman Bates – bass and Joe Morello – drums. Reunion displays Van Kriedt's great skills both as soloist and composer.

== Later life ==
In 1969 Dave and his wife, Margo immigrated to Australia with 3 of their 5 children. Leaving behind 2 daughters. In 1985, Van Kriedt lectured in composition for a semester at the Northern Rivers CAE in Lismore, NSW, Australia. Students remember him as full of life and pushing them to explore their boundaries at every step. He died, aged 72, in Newcastle, New South Wales, Australia.

== Sources ==
"Dave Brubeck Remembers Paul Desmond" - The following is taken from a film interview recorded at the Montreal Jazz Festival, June 28, 1991. Producer/Interviewer: Paul Caulfield for Mirus Communications Inc.

Article published by Phil Wright (Jazz Journalist, Historian)
