= Columbia Jazz Masterpieces =

Jazz music compilation series

Columbia Jazz Masterpieces was a series of jazz CD, LP and cassette reissues from Columbia Records which began in 1986. Written inside the blue box used on all the album covers "Digitally Remastered Directly from the Original Analog Tapes." In Europe, the series was known as CBS Jazz Masterpieces, with the reissues being released by CBS Records, until 1991, when the Columbia Jazz Masterpieces title was used on all subsequent releases and represses.

Michael Brooks was the producer for the oldest records reissued as part of the series, using the CEDAR process to digitally remaster them.

== Discography ==
- Armstrong, Louis and His All Stars - Louis Armstrong Plays W.C. Handy
- Armstrong, Louis and His All Stars - Satch Plays Fats
- Armstrong, Armstrong - Volume I through VII (comps of Hot Five and other material)
- Baker, Chet - With Strings
- Basie, Count - The Essential, Vol I
- Basie, Count - The Essential, Vol II
- Basie, Count - The Essential, Vol III
- Beiderbecke, Bix - Singin' the Blues 1 and At The Jazz Band Ball 2
- Blakey, Art - The Jazz Messengers
- Brubeck, Dave - Gone With The Wind
- Brubeck, Dave - The Great Concerts
- Brubeck, Dave - Interchanges '54
- Brubeck, Dave - Jazz Goes to College
- Brubeck, Dave - Jazz Impressions of New York
- Brubeck, Dave - Time Out
- Brubeck, Dave - West Side Story
- Brubeck, Dave - Dave Digs Disney (CBS 471250 2, 1994)'
- Bryant, Ray - Con Alma
- Christian, Charlie - Genius of the Electric Guitar
- Clayton, Buck - Jam Sessions From The Vault
- Condon, Eddie & His All-Stars - Dixieland Jam
- Davis, Miles - 58 Sessions
- Davis, Miles - Ballads
- Davis, Miles - Bitches Brew
- Davis, Miles - Cookin' at the Plugged Nickel
- Davis, Miles - In a Silent Way
- Davis, Miles - In Person Friday and Saturday Nights at the Blackhawk
- Davis, Miles - Kind of Blue
- Davis, Miles - Live Miles, More Music from Carnegie Hall
- Davis, Miles - Miles Ahead
- Davis, Miles - Miles & Coltrane
- Davis, Miles - Miles in the Sky
- Davis, Miles - Milestones
- Davis, Miles - On the Corner
- Davis, Miles - Porgy and Bess
- Davis, Miles - Round About Midnight
- Davis, Miles - Sketches of Spain
- Davis, Miles - Someday My Prince Will Come
- Davis, Miles - Sorcerer
- Davis, Miles - "Seven Steps to Heaven" (CBS 466970 2, 1992)
- Eldridge, Roy - Little Jazz, Uptown (w/Gene Krupa & Anita O'Day)
- Ellington, Duke - Blues in Orbit
- Ellington, Duke - The Duke's Men Vol 1 & 2
- Ellington, Duke - Ellington at Newport
- Ellington, Duke - Ellington Indigos
- Ellington, Duke - Ellington Uptown
- Ellington, Duke and Basie, Count - First Time! The Count Meets the Duke
- Ellington, Duke - Jazz Party
- Ellington, Duke - The Okeh Ellington
- Ellington, Duke - Three Suites
- Garner, Erroll - Body and Soul
- Garner, Erroll - Concert by the Sea
- Garner, Erroll - Long Ago and Far Away
- Getz, Stan - Lyrical
- Goodman, Benny - The Benny Goodman Sextet Featuring Charlie Christian: 1939-1941
- Goodman, Benny - Benny Goodman Sextet (CBS 450411 2, 1987)
- Goodman, Benny - Live at Carnegie Hall
- Goodman, Benny - On the Air 1937-1938
- Goodman, Benny - Slipped Disc
- Goodman, Benny - Small Groups 1941-45
- Goodman, Benny - Vol I, Roll 'Em
- Goodman, Benny - Vol II, Clarinet A La King
- Goodman, Benny - Vol III, All The Cats Join In
- Gordon, Dexter - Homecoming
- Hayes, Tubby w/Clark Terry - The New York Sessions
- Herman, Woody - The Thundering Herds
- Hines, Earl - Live at the Village Vanguard
- Holiday, Billie - Lady in Satin
- Holiday, Billie - The Quintessential, Vols. 1-9
- Johnson, J. J. - The Trombone Master
- Lambert, Hendricks & Ross - Everybody's Boppin'
- Mingus, Charles - Ah Um
- Mingus, Charles - Let My Children Hear Music
- Mingus, Charles - Mingus Dynasty (also released as Shoes of the Fisherman)
- Monk, Thelonious - Composer
- Monk, Thelonious - Criss-Cross
- Monk, Thelonious - Monk's Dream
- Monk, Thelonious - Standards
- Monk, Thelonious - Underground
- Rouse, Charlie - Unsung Hero
- Smith, Bessie - Collection
- Smith, Willie w/the Harry James Orchestra - Snooty Fruity
- Webster, Ben - Ben and "Sweets"

=== Various artists ===
- The Bebop Era
- The Jazz Arranger, Vol 1 & 2
- The Sound Of Jazz
- Sample Vol IV through IV
- The Jazz Masters
- Jazz Masterpieces Sampler Vol I
- Jazz Masterpieces Sampler Vol II
- Jazz Masterpieces Sampler Vol III
- Jazz Masterpieces Sampler Vol IV
- Jazz Masterpieces Sampler Vol V
- The 1930s - Big Bands
- The 1930s - Small Combos
- The 1930s - The Singers
- The 1940s - The Small Groups: New Directions
- The 1940s - The Singers
- The 1950s - The Singers
