= The Great Concerts =

Live album by The Dave Brubeck Quartet
- Released: 1988
- Recorded: February 21, 1963; Carnegie Hall, New York City; December 3, 1963; Concertgebouw, Amsterdam; March 5, 1958; Copenhagen
- Genre: Jazz
- Length: 74:00
- Label: Columbia; CK 44215
- Producer: Teo Macero (1–6), Mike Berniker (1–8), Cal Lampley (7–9)

The Great Concerts is a jazz live album by The Dave Brubeck Quartet. It was originally released on LP and CD under the series Columbia Jazz Masterpieces, in 1988. Then, it was re-released in 1998 and again in 2009. It includes live recordings from 1958 and 1963 (see below for an accurate description of the recordings). The pieces were produced by associated producers: the first six tracks were produced by Teo Macero and Mike Berniker; track 7 and 8 by Berniker and Cal Lampley.

Most of the material had been previously released on now out-of-print LPs, In Europe and At Carnegie Hall. However, some of the tracks included here are previously unreleased.

== Track listing ==
1. "Pennies From Heaven" (Johnny Burke, Arthur Johnston) 10:02
2. "For All We Know" (J. Fred Coots, Sam M. Lewis) 9:27
3. "Blue Rondo à la Turk" (Brubeck) 12:02
4. "Take Five" (Desmond) 6:29
5. "Take the "A" Train" (Billy Strayhorn) 5:10
6. "The Real Ambassador" (Brubeck) 7:22
7. "Wonderful Copenhagen" (Frank Loesser) 5:27
8. "Like Someone in Love" (Jimmy Van Heusen, Johnny Burke) 7:17
9. "Tangerine" (Victor Schertzinger, Johnny Mercer) 10:16

Tracks 1, 2, 3, 4 recorded on February 21, 1963 at Carnegie Hall, New York City; tracks 5, 6 recorded on December 3, 1963 at the Concertgebouw, Amsterdam; tracks 7, 8 and 9 recorded on March 5, 1958 in Copenhagen.

== Personnel ==
- Dave Brubeck – piano
- Paul Desmond – alto saxophone
- Gene Wright – double bass
- Joe Morello – drums
