= Newport 1958 (disambiguation) =

Newport 1958 or Live at Newport 1958, etc. can refer to one of several albums recorded at the 1958 Newport Jazz Festival.

- Newport 1958, a Duke Ellington album on Columbia Records
- Newport '58, a Dinah Washington album on EmArcy Records
- Live at Newport '58, a Horace Silver album on Blue Note Records - released in 2008
- At Newport 1958, a Miles Davis album on Columbia Records - released in 1964
- Live at Newport 1958 & 1963, a Sony Records album released in 1994 of live recordings made of Miles Davis and Thelonious Monk at the Newport Jazz Festivals in 1958 and 1963
- Newport 1958, Columbia Records recording of the Dave Brubeck Quartet
- Live at Newport 1958, a Mahalia Jackson recording from Columbia Records

See also:

- At Newport (disambiguation)
- Miles & Monk at Newport, Columbia Records album recorded live at the 1958 (Davis) and 1963 (Monk) Newport Jazz Festivals
- Ray Charles at Newport, Atlantic Records recording of Ray Charles at the 1958 Newport Jazz Festival
- Miles & Coltrane, Columbia Records release includes recordings from the 1958 Newport Jazz Festival
- Jazz on a Summer's Day, a 1960 documentary film set at the 1958 Newport Jazz Festival
