= Time Changes =

Studio album by The Dave Brubeck Quartet
- Released: 1964
- Recorded: November 1963
- Studios: Columbia 30th Street Studio, New York City
- Genres: Cool jazz, West Coast jazz
- Length: 35:00
- Label: Columbia
- Producer: Teo Macero

Dave Brubeck chronology
At Carnegie Hall (1963)	Time Changes (1964)	Dave Brubeck in Berlin (1964)

Professional ratings
Review scores
Source	Rating
Allmusic	2.5/5 stars

Time Changes is a 1964 album by The Dave Brubeck Quartet, based upon the use of time signatures that were unusual in jazz music.

The whole second side of the album, the composition "Elementals", resulted from a relationship with Rayburn Wright, The Eastman School of Music and its "Arranger's Workshop" and an impending concert in Rochester, New York. It was Mr. Brubeck's first orchestral composition.

== Overview ==
"Time Changes" is a continuation of Brubeck's hit albums Time Out, Time Further Out and Countdown—Time in Outer Space, exploring the elements of time in jazz and music, while extending itself into a "do-it-yourself" concerto, which comprises the whole of side two, with orchestral accompaniment. The cover painting is by the internationally acclaimed American abstract painter Sam Francis.

== Track listing ==
On the original vinyl LP:

=== Side A ===
1. "Iberia" - 3:00
2. "Unisphere" - 5:43
3. "Shim Wha" - 4:03
4. "World's Fair" - 2:45
5. "Cable Car" - 3:00
6. 'Theme From Elementals' - 3:09 (CD only)

=== Side B ===
1. "Elementals" - 16:35

== Personnel ==
All pieces composed by Dave Brubeck, except "Shim Wha" by Joe Morello. The album was recorded over various sessions that took place in November 1963.

Musical

- Dave Brubeck — piano
- Paul Desmond — alto saxophone
- Eugene Wright — bass
- Joe Morello — drums
- Rayburn Wright — orchestra conductor
- Fred Plaut, Robert Waller — recording engineers

== External links and sources ==
- https://web.archive.org/web/20121216140255/http://www.davebrubeck.com/live/ davebrubeck.com
- http://www.jazzdisco.org/dave-brubeck/catalog/album-index/ Brubeck discography
