= At Carnegie Hall (Dave Brubeck Quartet album) =

Live album by The Dave Brubeck Quartet
- Released: 1963
- Recorded: February 22, 1963
- Venue: Carnegie Hall (New York City)
- Genre: Jazz
- Length: 1:45:28 (2001 release)
- Label: Columbia
- Producer: Teo Macero

The Dave Brubeck Quartet chronology
Brandenburg Gate: Revisited (1963)	At Carnegie Hall (1963)	Time Changes (1963)

Professional ratings
Review scores
Source	Rating
Allmusic	4.5/5 stars
The Penguin Guide to Jazz Recordings	3.5/4 stars

At Carnegie Hall is a jazz live album by the Dave Brubeck Quartet. It was recorded at the famed Carnegie Hall in New York City on Friday, February 22, 1963. Critic Thom Jurek described it as "one of the great live jazz albums of the 1960s". Critic Jim Santella wrote, "This is timeless music from a classic ensemble. Goosebumps are guaranteed."

Ironically, original expectations for the concert were low. Not only was drummer Joe Morello recovering from a case of the flu at the time, but New York had been suffering from a newspaper strike, and the group was worried that the attendance would be sparse. The worries were groundless: the hall was full.

The original LP had several songs edited (most notably, both "For All We Know" and "Castilian Drums" by over four minutes each), several stage introductions removed and "It's a Raggy Waltz" moved to side 4 due to the time constraints of vinyl LPs. All of these issues were corrected in the 2001 Columbia/Legacy 2CD reissue. The liner notes (by George Simon, jazz critic for the New York Herald Tribune) include extensive comments by Brubeck on each selection.

== Track listing ==
All tracks composed by Dave Brubeck, except where indicated.
Side 1

1. "St. Louis Blues" (W. C. Handy) - 11:00
2. "Bossa Nova U.S.A." - 7:00
3. "For All We Know" (J. Fred Coots, Sam M. Lewis) - 5:00

Side 2

1. "Pennies from Heaven" (Arthur Johnston, Johnny Burke) - 10:40
2. "Southern Scene" - 7:00
3. "Three to Get Ready" - 6:50

Side 3

1. "Eleven-Four" (Paul Desmond) - 3:00
2. "King for a Day" (Dave Brubeck, Iola Brubeck) - 6:35
3. "Castilian Drums" - 10:13

Side 4

1. "It's a Raggy Waltz" - 6:30
2. "Blue Rondo à la Turk" - 11:50
3. "Take Five" (Paul Desmond) - 6:10

=== Columbia/Legacy 2CD reissue (2001) ===
Disc 1

1. "St. Louis Blues" (W. C. Handy) - 11:59
2. "Bossa Nova U.S.A." - 7:24
3. "For All We Know" (J. Fred Coots, Sam M. Lewis) - 9:43
4. "Pennies from Heaven" (Arthur Johnston, Johnny Burke) - 10:18
5. "Southern Scene" - 7:06
6. "Three to Get Ready" - 6:45

Disc 2

1. "Eleven-Four" (Paul Desmond) - 4:21
2. "It's a Raggy Waltz" - 7:14
3. "King for a Day" (Dave Brubeck, Iola Brubeck) - 6:16
4. "Castilian Drums" - 14:22
5. "Blue Rondo à la Turk" - 12:42
6. "Take Five" (Paul Desmond) - 7:17

== Personnel ==
- Dave Brubeck — piano
- Paul Desmond — alto saxophone
- Eugene Wright — double bass
- Joe Morello — drums

Production

- Teo Macero — producer, liner notes
- Peter Rachtman — concert producer
- George T. Simon — liner notes
- Anthony Janek, Fred Plaut, Frank Bruno — engineering
