= Buried Treasures (Dave Brubeck album) =

Live album by Dave Brubeck
- Released: 1998
- Recorded: May 12–14, 1967 in Mexico City, Mexico
- Genre: Jazz
- Length: 55:09
- Label: Columbia
- Producer: Didier C. Deutsch, Russell Gloyd

Dave Brubeck chronology
Bravo! Brubeck! (1965)	Buried Treasures (1998)	The Last Time We Saw Paris (1967)

Buried Treasures is a 1967 live album by Dave Brubeck and his quartet, recorded during their tour of Mexico. It was released in 1998. A second live album recorded on their tour, Bravo! Brubeck!, was released in July 1967.

== Reception ==
Professional ratings
Review scores
Source	Rating
Allmusic	4/5 stars
The Penguin Guide to Jazz Recordings	3/4 stars

The album was reviewed by Scott Yanow at Allmusic who wrote that "The quality is certainly quite high, with Brubeck and Desmond really digging into such songs as "Koto Song" (coming up with some inspired ideas over its vamp), "You Go to My Head," a lengthy "St. Louis Blues," and a fairly concise version of "Take Five," one of the few versions by Brubeck of the hit song that does not have a drum solo. ...the Quartet is heard throughout in prime form. Recommended".

Doug Ramsey reviewed the album for Jazz Times and wrote that "It catches the quartet in as fine fettle...The empathy, the tightness, the ability to anticipate that this band had developed in nearly a decade together was at its peak. "Mr. Broadway," at a furious clip, is pure exhiliration. The listener has to wonder at Wright's and Morello's cohesiveness, let alone their continued swing, under Brubeck's fragmentation of meter in his solo. There is a "Koto Song" with Desmond again proving himself a blues master and Brubeck as delicate as a French impressionist. ...This was an impressive group. Seven months later, Brubeck disbanded it".

== Track listing ==
1. Introduction – 1:30
2. "Mr. Broadway" (Dave Brubeck) – 7:18
3. "Koto Song" (Brubeck) – 7:21
4. "Sweet Georgia Brown" (Ben Bernie, Kenneth Casey, Maceo Pinkard) – 7:38
5. "Forty Days" (Brubeck) – 7:22
6. "You Go to My Head" (J. Fred Coots, Haven Gillespie) – 7:31
7. "Take Five" (Paul Desmond) – 5:10
8. "Saint Louis Blues" (W. C. Handy) – 11:19

== Personnel ==
Performance

- Dave Brubeck — piano, arranger, liner notes
- Paul Desmond — alto saxophone
- Gene Wright — double bass
- Joe Morello — drums

Production

- Steven Berkowitz, Patti Matheny — A&R
- Howard Fitzson — art direction, photography
- Randall Martin — design, reissue design
- Seth Rothstein — director
- Nicholas Bennett — packaging manager
- Hank Parker — photography
- Didier C. Deutsch, Russell Gloyd — reissue producer
- John Jackson — production assistant
- Howard Fritzson — reissue art
- Darcy Proper — remastering, remixing
