= Jazz: Red Hot and Cool =

Live album by The Dave Brubeck Quartet
- Released: 1955 (Vinyl album); 2001 (CD reissue)
- Recorded: October 12, 1954; July 23, 1955; August 9, 1955; Basin Street East, New York City
- Genre: Jazz
- Length: 46:03 (1955); 57:12 (2001)
- Label: Columbia
- Producer: George Avakian

The Dave Brubeck Quartet chronology
Brubeck Time (1955)	Jazz: Red Hot and Cool (1955)	Brubeck Plays Brubeck (1956)

Professional ratings
Review scores
Source	Rating
Billboard	Spotlight pick
The Penguin Guide to Jazz Recordings	3/4 stars

Jazz: Red Hot and Cool is a jazz live album by The Dave Brubeck Quartet. It was recorded during one 1954 and two 1955 performances at the Basin Street East club in New York City. Released originally in 1955, this album was remastered and reissued in 2001, while adding two tracks that were not included in the original album.

This album presents the pre-classic Quartet with Bob Bates on bass and Joe Dodge on drums backing pianist Dave Brubeck and alto saxophonist Paul Desmond, before the bassist Eugene Wright and drummer Joe Morello joined the most experimental Brubeck Quartet of the sixties.

As a result, on the strength of the complex chords of Brubeck and the remarkably cool tone of Desmond, relaxing and calming, Bates and Dodge focus on giving a swinging, but solid and quiet accompaniment to the quartet, without disrupting the discursive flow of ideas between the pianist and the altoist.

== Repertoire ==
This Columbia Records release, recorded in the intimate set of a night club, is notable for introducing Brubeck's composition The Duke, a tribute to the magisterial Duke Ellington which was destined to become a jazz standard in the years to come, due to its cerebral and intricate harmonic structure.

In addition, other highlights came from a book of standards that includes popular tunes composed by Irving Caesar, Mort Dixon, James F. Hanley, Lorenz Hart, Ballard MacDonald, Richard Rodgers, Vincent Youmans, Allie Wrubel, and the brothers Ira and George Gershwin. The two tracks that were included in the reissue are a traditional piece, composed by Vernon Duke, John La Touche and Ted Fetter, and another original created by Brubeck.

== Cover art ==
The cover photograph used for this record was taken by Richard Avedon at hungry i nightclub in San Francisco and was done in partnership with the Helena Rubinstein cosmetics company. It took its title from a new shade of lipstick Rubinstein introduced in the late 1954. According to the liner notes by Brubeck’s longtime producer George Avakian, while the cosmetics company launched an advertising campaign in major fashion magazines in different full-page advertisements, the ladies who bought the lipstick also got a copy of Jazz Combo Tool; a small Columbia six inch, red-orange vinyl record in 78 rpm speed which included excerpts from Eddie Condon and Turk Murphy on its Jazz Combo Hot side, and Pete Rugolo and Brubeck on its Jazz Combo Cool side. In the cover photo, model and actress Suzy Parker leans on a piano at which Dave Brubeck is seated.

== Chart performance ==
The album debuted on Billboard magazine's Best Selling Popular Albums chart in the issue dated November 12, 1955, peaking at No. 7 during a two-week run on the chart. The album would also go on to reach No. 1 on the Best Selling Jazz Packaged Records chart on December 3rd of that year.

== Track list ==
A1 "Lover" (Hart/Rodgers) 5:08
A2 "Little Girl Blue" (Hart/Rodgers) 10:40
A3 "Fare Thee Well, Annabelle" (Wrubel/Dixon) 7:23
B1 "Sometimes I'm Happy" (Caesar/Youmans) 5:23
B2 "The Duke" (Brubeck) 2:46
B3 "Indiana" (B. MacDonald/Hanley) 5:55
B4 "Love Walked In" (I. & G. Gershwin) 8:47

"Taking a Chance on Love" (Duke/La Touche/Fetter) 4:12 *
"Closing Time Blues" (Brubeck) 6:57 *

* Included only in the 2001 reissue.

== Personnel ==
- Dave Brubeck - piano
- Paul Desmond - alto sax
- Bob Bates - double bass
- Joe Dodge - drums

== Charts ==
Chart (1955)	Peak position
US Billboard Best Selling Popular Albums	7
US Billboard Best Selling Jazz Packaged Records	1
