= Jazz Impressions of Eurasia =

Live album by Dave Brubeck
- Released: 1958
- Recorded: July–August 1958
- Studios: Columbia 30th Street Studio, New York City
- Genre: Jazz
- Length: 39:31
- Label: Columbia

Dave Brubeck chronology
| Newport 1958 (1958) | Jazz Impressions of Eurasia (1958) | Gone with the Wind (1959) |

Jazz Impressions of Eurasia is a studio album by pianist Dave Brubeck and his quartet recorded after, and inspired by, their 1958 world tour sponsored by the United States Department of State during which they played 80 concerts in 14 countries, including Turkey, Iran, Iraq, India, Pakistan, and Afghanistan, over three months. In the liner notes to the album, Brubeck notes that "These sketches of Eurasia have been developed from random musical phrases I jotted down in my notebook as we chugged across the fields of Europe, or skimmed across the deserts of Asia, or walked in the alleyways of an ancient bazaar. ... I tried to create an impression of a particular locale by using some of the elements of their folk music within the jazz idiom." The album was recorded in July and August 1958 at the Columbia 30th St. Studios in New York.

== Music ==
Brubeck composed the six pieces for the album—along with "Blue Rondo à la Turk," which appeared on the group's signature album of the following year, Time Out—while on tour across Eurasia. The opening piece, "Nomad," was inspired by the drums that nomads in Kabul used to ward off wild dogs. It opens with Joe Morello's tom-tom riff and includes a Paul Desmond solo described as "a focused beam of moonlight glinting off the caravan's trappings." The Bach-inspired "Brandenburg Gate" features fugue-like interactions between Brubeck and Desmond. This piece was re-recorded three years later in an extended version with symphony orchestra and eventually released on the album Brandenburg Gate: Revisited (1964). Like the opening piece, "The Golden Horn" was inspired by Turkey, specifically the rhythm of "choktasha-keraderam," the Turkish words for "thank you." Likewise, the next piece, subtitled "Dziekuje," comes from the Polish word for "thank you," and was inspired by a visit to a museum dedicated to Frédéric Chopin, where Brubeck was fascinated by a cast of Chopin's hands and by his piano. Brubeck noted that the piece's melody is deliberately "Chopinesque," and it was rapturously greeted by a Polish audience when first performed. "Marble Arch" was inspired by Marble Arch in Hyde Park, London, and features a solo by bassist Joe Benjamin. The concluding "Calcutta Blues" was an ode to the terrible misery, including three raging plagues, that the band witnessed in the city. It also represents the first effort in jazz to incorporate melodic and rhythmic elements of traditional Indian music. Brubeck's piano phrases imitate a sitar, while Morello's extended drum solo imitates a tabla. While in Bombay, Brubeck had joined a jam session with sitarist Abdul Halim Jaffer Khan. Brubeck later noted that Khan's influence made him "play in a different way." The album precedes the somewhat similar concept of The Far East Suite by Duke Ellington and Billy Strayhorn, inspired by a similar State Department world tour, which appeared eight years later.

== Reception ==
Professional ratings
Review scores
| Source | Rating |
|---|---|
| Allmusic | 4/5 stars |
| The Penguin Guide to Jazz Recordings | 3/4 stars |

Billboard magazine featured the album as a "Billboard Pick" in their November 24, 1958 issue and described it as an "excellent six track set which allows Desmond his usual share of honors."

Ken Dryden reviewed the album for Allmusic and wrote that "'Nomad' and 'Brandenburg Gate' are the best-known originals but all of the other selections are equally enjoyable, featuring fine solos from Brubeck and altoist Paul Desmond."

== Track listing ==
All compositions by Dave Brubeck except where noted.

1. "Nomad" (Dave Brubeck, Iola Brubeck) – 7:23
2. "Brandenburg Gate" – 6:55
3. "The Golden Horn" – 5:02
4. "Thank You (Dziekuje)" – 3:35
5. "Marble Arch" – 6:59
6. "Calcutta Blues" – 9:53

== Personnel ==
- Dave Brubeck – piano
- Paul Desmond – alto saxophone
- Joe Benjamin – double bass
- Joe Morello – drums

== See also ==
- 1958 in music
