= The Dave Brubeck Quartet in Europe =

Live album by Dave Brubeck
- Released: 1958
- Recorded: March 5, 1958 in Copenhagen
- Genre: Jazz
- Length: 43:11
- Label: Columbia

Dave Brubeck chronology
Newport 1958 (1958)	The Dave Brubeck Quartet in Europe (1958)	Jazz Impressions of Eurasia (1958)

The Dave Brubeck Quartet in Europe is a live album by pianist Dave Brubeck and his quartet recorded in 1958 in Copenhagen, Denmark. The cartoon on the cover of the album of Brubeck and his quartet was drawn by Arnold Roth.

== Reception ==
Professional ratings
Review scores
Source	Rating
Allmusic	4/5 stars

Ken Dryden reviewed the album for Allmusic and wrote that "...the quartet is in top form, while Brubeck is hardly the heavy-handed pianist that many early critics claimed him to be on these rewarding performances" Dryden praised Paul Desmond's "lyricism and witty quotes especially of note in the extended treatment of the standard "Tangerine"".

== Track listing ==
1. "Wonderful Copenhagen" (Frank Loesser)
2. "My One Bad Habit" (Dave Brubeck, Iola Brubeck)
3. "Tangerine" (Johnny Mercer, Victor Schertzinger)
4. "The Wright Groove" (Eugene Wright)
5. "Like Someone in Love" (Johnny Burke, Jimmy Van Heusen)
6. "Watusi Drums" (D. Brubeck)

== Personnel ==
- Dave Brubeck – piano
- Paul Desmond – alto saxophone
- Eugene Wright – double bass
- Joe Morello – drums
- Arnold Roth – cover artwork
