= Tonight Only! =

Studio album by Dave Brubeck and Carmen McRae
- Released: 1961
- Recorded: 9 September, 14–15 December 1960, New York
- Genre: Jazz
- Length: 43:29
- Label: Columbia
- Producer: Teo Macero

Dave Brubeck chronology
Southern Scene (1960)	Tonight Only! (1961)	Countdown—Time in Outer Space (1960)

Carmen McRae chronology
Something to Swing About (1959)	Tonight Only! (1961)	Sings Lover Man and Other Billie Holiday Classics (1962)

Tonight Only! is a 1961 album by the Dave Brubeck Quartet featuring the singer Carmen McRae.

This was the first of three albums that Brubeck and McRae would make together, they would later work on Take Five Live (1961) and The Real Ambassadors (1962). Brubeck praised McRae's lyrical interpretations of his songs, later stating that "Carmen has added even to my own understanding of the music".

Brubeck's wife, Iola, contributed lyrics to three songs: "Weep No More", "Briar Bush" and "Strange Meadow Lark".

== Reception ==
Professional ratings
Review scores
Source	Rating
Allmusic	3/5 stars

The Billboard magazine review from 5 June 1961 chose Tonight Only! as one of its 'Spotlight Winners of the Week' and commented, "Brubeck teams up with canary Carmen McRae on this package and the results are eminently tasteful and listenable".

The album was reviewed by Scott Yanow at Allmusic who wrote, "One of the more obscure Dave Brubeck albums is really a showcase for the young singer Carmen McRae who performs nine numbers ...McRae is in fine voice but strangely enough all of the songs (except for "Strange Meadowlark") have been long forgotten. Stronger material would have resulted in a more memorable session".

== Track listing ==
1. "Melanctha" – 9:58
2. "Weep No More" (Dave Brubeck, Iola Brubeck) – 2:49
3. "Talkin' and Walkin'" (Eugene Wright) – 4:24
4. "Briar Bush" (D. Brubeck, I. Brubeck) – 2:58
5. "Paradiddle Joe" (Johnny Morris, Fred Parries, Jerry Pugsley) – 2:00
6. "Late Lament" (Paul Desmond) – 6:17
7. "Strange Meadow Lark" (D. Brubeck, I. Brubeck) – 2:38
8. "Tristesse" (D. Brubeck) – 4:58
9. "Tonight Only" (D. Brubeck) – 7:27

Tracks 2, 4, 5, 7, with McRae, were recorded on September 9, 1960; tracks 1 and 8 were recorded December 14, and on the following day, December 15, tracks 3, 6 and 9. Track 8, "Tristesse", is a piano solo by Brubeck.

== Personnel ==
The Dave Brubeck Quartet

- Dave Brubeck – piano
- Paul Desmond – alto saxophone
- Gene Wright – double bass
- Joe Morello – drums

with

- Carmen McRae – vocals (2, 4, 5, 7)

Production

- Teo Macero – producer, liner notes
- Henry Parker – photography
