= Brubeck in Amsterdam =

Live album by Dave Brubeck
- Released: 1969
- Recorded: December 3, 1962 at the Concertgebouw, Amsterdam
- Genre: Jazz
- Length: 44:19
- Label: Columbia - CS 9897

Dave Brubeck chronology
Bossa Nova U.S.A. (1963)	Brubeck in Amsterdam (1969)	Brandenburg Gate: Revisited (1963)

Brubeck in Amsterdam is a 1962 live album by Dave Brubeck and his quartet recorded on 3 December at the Concertgebouw in Amsterdam, though unreleased until 1969. Six of the tracks are from Brubeck's musical The Real Ambassadors.

== Reception ==
Professional ratings
Review scores
Source	Rating
Allmusic	2.5/5 stars

Scott Yanow reviewed the album for Allmusic and wrote that Brubeck and his quartet "...seem inspired during this concert by the fresh material, making this hard-to-find album a bit of a collector's item."

== Track listing ==
All compositions by Dave Brubeck, lyricists indicated:

1. "Since Love Had Its Way" (Iola Brubeck) - 5:57
2. "King for a Day" (I. Brubeck) - 3:00
3. "The Real Ambassador" (I. Brubeck) - 6:31
4. "They Say I Look Like God" (I. Brubeck) - 4:14
5. "Dizzy Ditty" - 2:50
6. "Cultural Exchange" (I. Brubeck) - 5:57
7. "Good Reviews" (I. Brubeck) - 3:55
8. "Brandenburg Gate" - 11:55

== Personnel ==
- Dave Brubeck - piano, producer
- Paul Desmond - alto saxophone
- Eugene Wright - double bass
- Joe Morello - drums
