= Brubeck =

Brubeck may refer to:

- Dave Brubeck (1920–2012), American jazz musician
- Howard Brubeck (1916–1993), American composer, brother of Dave Brubeck
- Darius Brubeck (born 1947), American music educator, son of Dave Brubeck
- Chris Brubeck (born 1951), American musician, son of Dave Brubeck
- Matt Brubeck (born 1961), American musician, son of Dave Brubeck

== See also ==
- 5079 Brubeck, an asteroid named after Dave Brubeck
