= Dave Brubeck in Berlin =

Live album by Dave Brubeck
- Released: 1964
- Recorded: September 1964
- Genre: Jazz
- Length: 33:49
- Label: CBS

Dave Brubeck chronology
Time Changes (1964)	Dave Brubeck in Berlin (1964)	Jazz Impressions of Japan (1965)

Dave Brubeck in Berlin is a 1965 live album by Dave Brubeck recorded at the Berliner Philharmonie in Berlin. The album was only released on LP in Germany, after having been recorded for radio broadcast by WDR Cologne. It was not released in the United States until 1999.

== Reception ==
Professional ratings
Review scores
Source	Rating
Allmusic	4/5 stars

The album was reviewed by Ken Dryden at Allmusic who wrote that "[Paul] Desmond is witty as usual in "St. Louis Blues," though Brubeck adds an amusing Charlie Parker lick in his solo and bassist Eugene Wright also shines." Dryden wrote that Brubeck's "economical solo" on "Koto Song" "...contrasts with his supposed reputation for heavy-handed playing. The group's breezy rendition of "Take the 'A' Train" is followed by the inevitable "Take Five"."

== Track listing ==
1. "St. Louis Blues" (W. C. Handy) - 12:05
2. "Koto Song" (Dave Brubeck) - 7:44
3. "Take the "A" Train" (Billy Strayhorn) - 8:30
4. "Take Five" (Paul Desmond) - 6:30

== Personnel ==
- Dave Brubeck - piano
- Paul Desmond - alto saxophone
- Gene Wright - double bass
- Joe Morello - drums
- Teo Macero - producer
