= Bossa Nova U.S.A. =

Bossa Nova USA

Studio album by Dave Brubeck Quartet
- Released: 1963
- Recorded: 3 January – 25 October 1962
- Genre: Cool jazz
- Length: 40:48
- Label: Columbia
- Producer: Teo Macero

Dave Brubeck Quartet chronology
Bennett/Brubeck. The White House Sessions, Live 1962 (1962)	Bossa Nova USA (1963)	Brubeck in Amsterdam (1963)

Professional ratings
Review scores
Source	Rating
Allmusic	3/5 stars
Billboard	(favorable)
Down Beat	2.5/5 stars
New Record Mirror	4/5 stars

Bossa Nova U.S.A. is a 1963 studio album by the Dave Brubeck Quartet. Columbia released it in the United States as LP record CS 8798 (stereo) and CL 1998 (mono), and in England as SBPG 62127. It was also released by CBS in Australia, as catalog SPB 233.038.

== Background and recording ==
Since 1955, Brubeck had been composing and performing pieces originating from influences outside of the European musical tradition. Bossa Nova USA, released during the U.S. bossa nova craze of the late 1950s and early '60s, fit within this category. It was intended to be "impressionistic" of "the cool wave from Brazil."

All of the album's tracks were recorded in New York City in 1962. Five tracks were recorded on January 3 in a session dedicated to bossa nova. Two tracks were recorded on July 5 in another dedicated session, while two more tracks were recorded on July 12 in a session with an extra track that appeared on the 1965 album My Favorite Things. The last track to be recorded was the title track, laid down on October 25, in a session that included three songs which ended up on other albums. Bossa Nova USA was a departure from Brubeck's "time"-themed series of albums, in that each track is marked simply by a samba-based rhythm.

== Release ==
With a planned 1963 release, the album was designed to appeal to the pop charts. The title track was released as a single (Columbia 42651) in the last week of 1962, featuring "This Can't Be Love" on the B-side. The single met with moderate success, peaking at #69 on the Billboard Hot 100. The album followed soon in early 1963.

== Reception ==
Billboard magazine called Bossa Nova USA "first-class Brubeck". While noting the number of bossa tracks, the magazine especially praised the reworking of "The Trolley Song" as a standout effort. The Age expected the album to be popular with the general public, but noted that "purists will wince." The album found more success with the public than the single, appearing for fifteen weeks on Billboard's album charts, achieving position #14.

In 1998, the album was released in Japan as a CD, in mini LP format, in the "Sony Master Sound" series as Sony Records SRCS 9364.

== Track listing ==
All tracks composed by Dave Brubeck, except where indicated:

No.	Title	Writer(s)	Recording date	Length
1.	"Bossa Nova U.S.A."		October 25, 1962	2:24
2.	"Vento Fresco (Cool Wind)"		January 3, 1962	3:30
3.	"The Trolley Song"	Hugh Martin, Ralph Blane	July 5, 1962	3:04
4.	"Theme for June"	Howard Brubeck	July 12, 1962	4:15
5.	"Coracao Sensivel"	Teo Macero	January 3, 1962	4:10
6.	"Irmao Amigo"		January 3, 1962	3:22
7.	"There'll Be No Tomorrow"	Iola Brubeck, Dave Brubeck	July 12, 1962	5:42
8.	"Cantiga Nova Swing"		January 3, 1962	2:46
9.	"Lamento"		January 3, 1962	4:45
10.	"This Can't Be Love"	Richard Rodgers, Lorenz Hart	July 5, 1962	3:45
Total length:				40:48

== Personnel ==
- Dave Brubeck – piano
- Paul Desmond – saxophone
- Joe Morello – drums
- Eugene Wright – double bass
