= Bernstein Plays Brubeck Plays Bernstein =

Studio album by The Dave Brubeck Quartet
- Released: 1961
- Recorded: January 30 – February 14, 1960
- Genre: Cool jazz, West Coast jazz
- Length: 41:23
- Label: Columbia

Dave Brubeck chronology
Near-Myth (OJC) (1961)	Bernstein Plays Brubeck Plays Bernstein (1961)	Time Further Out (1961)

Professional ratings
Review scores
Source	Rating
AllMusic	4/5 stars

Bernstein Plays Brubeck Plays Bernstein is a 1961 studio album by The Dave Brubeck Quartet. Its title refers to the fact that it consists of both a Brubeck composition conducted by Leonard Bernstein (though the "Brubeck" there is Howard Brubeck, Dave Brubeck's brother) and Bernstein compositions played by the Dave Brubeck Quartet. The title is also an echo of Dave Brubeck's 1956 solo debut album, Brubeck Plays Brubeck.

The whole first side of the album consists of the composition "Dialogues for Jazz Combo and Orchestra", composed by Howard Brubeck and performed by the New York Philharmonic and the Dave Brubeck Quartet, under the direction of Leonard Bernstein. The second side consists of arrangements of five songs from the musicals West Side Story and Wonderful Town, whose music was written by Bernstein.

== Overview ==
The album started to take shape when "Dialogues for Jazz Combo and Orchestra" was premiered at a New York Philharmonic series on December 10, 11 and 13, 1959, with Leonard Bernstein conducting. This was considered at the time to be an early, successful jazz/classical crossover project – similar to those that had already been initiated by the Modern Jazz Quartet, Gunther Schuller and their peers in the study of what Schuller termed "Third Stream" music.

=== The Dialogues ===
"In this work an attempt is made to construct a score giving the orchestra an important part to play which adheres strictly to written notes, while the particular combination, or 'combo', of jazz instruments, is free to improvise on the material of the movement..." —Howard Brubeck (Original LP liner notes)

== Chart performance ==
The album debuted on Billboard magazine's Stereo Action Albums chart in the issue dated December 12, 1960, peaking at No. 13 during a seven-week run on the chart.

== Track listing ==
On the original vinyl LP record:

=== Side A ===
1. "Dialogues for Jazz Combo and Orchestra (Allegro)" – 6:55
2. "Dialogues for Jazz Combo and Orchestra (Andante-Ballad)" – 5:13
3. "Dialogues for Jazz Combo and Orchestra (Adagio-Ballad)" – 4:46
4. "Dialogues for Jazz Combo and Orchestra (Allegro-Blues)" – 5:34

=== Side B ===
1. "Maria" (Leonard Bernstein, Stephen Sondheim) – 3:16
2. "I Feel Pretty" (Leonard Bernstein, Stephen Sondheim) – 5:06
3. "Somewhere" (Leonard Bernstein, Stephen Sondheim) – 4:13
4. "A Quiet Girl" (Leonard Bernstein, Betty Comden, Adolph Green) – 2:23
5. "Tonight" (Leonard Bernstein, Stephen Sondheim) – 3:48

== Personnel ==
The Dialogues for Jazz Combo and Orchestra was composed by Howard Brubeck; the other selections were composed by Leonard Bernstein.

Musical

- Dave Brubeck – piano
- Paul Desmond – alto saxophone
- Eugene Wright – double bass
- Joe Morello – drums
- Leonard Bernstein conducting New York Philharmonic

== Charts ==
Chart (1963)	Peak position
US Billboard Stereo Action Albums	13
