= One Song =

One Song may refer to:

- "One Song" (Disney song), a song from the 1937 Disney film soundtrack Snow White and the Seven Dwarfs
- "One Song" (Tevin Campbell song), a 1991 song by Tevin Campbell
- "One Song" (Prince song), a 1999 song by Prince
- "One Song" (Envy song), a 2013 song by Norwegian duo Envy
- "One Song" (Archie Roach song), a 2022 song by Australian artist, Archie Roach

== See also ==
- One More Song, the second album by Randy Meisner
- One Song at a Time, an album by Jamie Grace
- "One Song for You", a song by Sleater-Kinney from their 1999 album The Hot Rock
- One (disambiguation) § Songs
