= Newport Festival =

Newport Festival may refer to a number of events in the United States:

== Rhode Island ==
- Newport Jazz Festival (begun 1954), a music festival held every August
- Newport Folk Festival (begun 1959), an American annual folk-oriented music festival
- Newport Music Festival (begun 1969), a classical music festival
- Newport International Film Festival (begun 1998), a film festival held in Newport, Rhode Island

== California ==
- Newport Pop Festival, held in Costa Mesa, California, in 1968, or sequel, billed as Newport 69, held in Northridge, California in 1969
- Newport Beach Film Festival (begun 1999), a film festival held in Newport Beach, California

== See also ==
- Isle of Wight Festival, near Newport, England
- At Newport (disambiguation) for music albums recorded at these festivals
- Festivals in Rhode Island
