= Late Lament =

Late Lament may refer to:

- A part of the song "Nights in White Satin"
- A composition by Paul Desmond, first recorded on The Dave Brubeck Quartet album Tonight Only!, and later on his own album Desmond Blue
