= Time In (album) =

Studio album by Dave Brubeck
- Released: June 14, 1966
- Recorded: October 1965
- Genre: Jazz
- Length: 37:44
- Label: Columbia
- Producer: Teo Macero

Dave Brubeck chronology
My Favorite Things (1966)	Time In (1966)	Anything Goes! The Dave Brubeck Quartet Plays Cole Porter (1967)

Professional ratings
Review scores
Source	Rating
Allmusic	4/5 stars
The Penguin Guide to Jazz Recordings	3.5/4 stars

Time In is a 1966 studio album by Dave Brubeck, the last of Brubeck's 'Time' series.

All the compositions on it were written by Dave Brubeck (two co-written with his wife Iola Brubeck) and performed by the Dave Brubeck Quartet. Stylistically, they cover a considerable range, from slow ballads in a West Coast jazz sound, to some of the religiously themed work he began to essay in the later 1960s (Forty Days, which would later appear in his The Light in the Wilderness: An Oratorio for Today), to more driving bebop-influenced numbers.

AllMusic's reviewer Thom Jurek wrote that it was "one of his most musically adventurous. ... of all the 'Time' recordings, this is the least commercial ... Though it is seldom celebrated as such, this is one of Brubeck's finest moments on Columbia."

The Absolute Sound's Jeff Wilson wrote: "This 1965 release ended the Dave Brubeck Quartet’s series of time-themed albums, the most famous being 1959’s Time Out, which contained the ever-popular 'Take Five'. Time In was also one of the final records by a much-loved quartet that included Paul Desmond on alto saxophone. With more than two dozen albums behind them by the time this album was recorded, was the foursome a spent force? Definitely not—and, in fact, one listen to Time In will dispel any notions of the quartet as 'polite jazz'. On the ironically-titled opening track, 'Lost Waltz', the group swings with an urgency that reaches its peak during Brubeck’s vigorous solo. 'Softly, William, Softly' is a deeply expressive ballad, and 'Lonesome' is equally moving. Throughout Time In Brubeck’s compositions bring out the best in Desmond, whose light, airy sound was the musical equivalent of a martini so dry it would have passed inspection by Winston Churchill."

== Track listing ==
1. "Lost Waltz" (Dave Brubeck) 3:52
2. "Softly, William, Softly" (D. Brubeck) 5:38
3. "Time In" (D. Brubeck) 3:57
4. "40 Days" (D. Brubeck) 4:38
5. "Travellin' Blues" (D. Brubeck, Iola Brubeck) 5:57
6. "He Done Her Wrong" (D. Brubeck) 2:14
7. "Lonesome" (D. Brubeck, I. Brubeck) 7:10
8. "Cassandra" (D. Brubeck) 4:18

Bonus Tracks added to 2004 CD issue

1. "Rude Old Man" (Eugene Wright) 2:22
2. "Who Said That?" (D. Brubeck) 3:32
3. "Watusi Drums" (D. Brubeck) 2:23

(Times are as given on the CD; the album numbers differ slightly.)

== Personnel ==
- Dave Brubeck – piano
- Paul Desmond – alto saxophone
- Gene Wright – double bass
- Joe Morello – drums
