= Carmen McRae Sings Lover Man and Other Billie Holiday Classics =

Studio album by Carmen McRae
- Released: 1962
- Recorded: June 29 and July 26, 1961
- Studio: Columbia Studio A, New York City
- Genre: Jazz
- Length: 42:37
- Label: Columbia; CL 1730 (mono), CS 8530 (stereo)
- Producer: Teo Macero, Carmen McRae

Carmen McRae chronology
Tonight Only! (1961)	Carmen McRae Sings Lover Man and Other Billie Holiday Classics (1962)	Take Five Live (1962)

Carmen McRae Sings Lover Man and Other Billie Holiday Classics is a 1962 studio album by jazz singer Carmen McRae, arranged by Norman Simmons, who also provided the piano accompaniment for some songs and produced by Teo Macero. The album was released on Columbia Records on vinyl LP. It was recorded in tribute to McRae's idol, Billie Holiday, who had died two years previously.

== Reception ==
Professional ratings
Review scores
Source	Rating
AllMusic	4.5/5 stars
The Rolling Stone Jazz Record Guide	5/5 stars
The Penguin Guide to Jazz Recordings	4/4 stars

Scott Yanow of AllMusic said that the album was one of McRae's "best recordings of the 1960s. McRae always considered Billie Holiday to be her primary influence, so a tribute album was a natural project for her...Recommended".

== Track listing ==
1. "Them There Eyes" (Maceo Pinkard, Doris Tauber, William Tracey) - 2:45
2. "Yesterdays" (Jerome Kern, Otto Harbach) - 4:52
3. "I'm Gonna Lock My Heart (And Throw Away the Key)" (Jimmy Eaton, Terry Shand) - 2:32
4. "Strange Fruit" (Lewis Allen) - 2:47
5. "Miss Brown to You" (Richard A. Whiting, Ralph Rainger, Leo Robin) - 2:28
6. "My Man" (Maurice Yvain, Jacques Charles, Albert Willemetz, Channing Pollack) - 4:05
7. "I Cried for You (Now It's Your Turn to Cry Over Me)" (Gus Arnheim, Abe Lyman, Arthur Freed) - 2:52
8. "Lover Man (Oh, Where Can You Be?)" (Jimmy Davis, Roger "Ram" Ramirez, James Sherman) - 4:18
9. "Trav'lin' Light" (Trummy Young, Jimmy Mundy, Johnny Mercer) - 2:20
10. "Some Other Spring" (Arthur Herzog, Jr., Irene Kitchings) - 3:02
11. "What a Little Moonlight Can Do" (Harry Woods) - 3:31
12. "God Bless the Child" (Herzog, Billie Holiday) - 3:24
13. "If the Moon Turns Green" (Bernie Hanighen, Paul Coates) - 3:27
14. "The Christmas Song" (Mel Torme, Robert Wells) - 3:55

== Personnel ==
- Carmen McRae - vocals
- Eddie "Lockjaw" Davis - tenor saxophone
- Nat Adderley - cornet
- Norman Simmons - piano, arranger
- Mundell Lowe - guitar
- Bob Cranshaw - double bass
- Walter Perkins - drums
