= Jackpot! (Dave Brubeck album) =

Live album by Dave Brubeck
- Released: February 1968
- Recorded: 1966
- Venue: Tropicana Hotel, Las Vegas
- Genre: Jazz
- Label: Columbia
- Producer: Teo Macero

Dave Brubeck chronology
Anything Goes! The Dave Brubeck Quartet Plays Cole Porter (1965)	Jackpot! (1968)	Bravo! Brubeck! (1967)

Jackpot! is a 1966 live album by Dave Brubeck, recorded at the Tropicana Hotel in Las Vegas. It was released in 1968.

== Reception ==
Professional ratings
Review scores
Source	Rating
Allmusic	1.5/5 stars

The initial Billboard magazine review from February 1968 wrote that "Brubeck is tagged in a live workout...and he comes out ahead all the way. His pianistics are as sharp as ever and so are his efficient aides...". The album was reviewed by Scott Yanow at Allmusic who wrote that "...this LP features eight songs built around the theme of gambling towns such as "Ace in the Hole," "Chicago" and the title cut. The music is certainly upbeat but the out-of-tune piano and crowd noises (this date was recorded live in Las Vegas) are a bit distracting. It's strictly for Brubeck completists."

== Track listing ==
1. "Who's Afraid" (Paul Francis Webster, Alex North) - 3:07
2. "Ace in the Hole" (George Mitchell, James Dempsey) - 6:44
3. "Jackpot" (Dave Brubeck) - 10:59
4. "Out of Nowhere" (Johnny Green, Edward Heyman) - 6:49
5. "You Go to My Head" (J. Fred Coots, Haven Gillespie) - 10:21
6. "Chicago" (Fred Fisher) - 4:03
7. "Rude Old Man" (Eugene Wright) - 2:55
8. "Win a Few, Lose a Few" (Dave Brubeck) - 4:51

== Personnel ==
- Dave Brubeck - piano
- Paul Desmond - alto saxophone
- Gene Wright - double bass
- Joe Morello - drums
- Teo Macero - producer
