= Anything Goes! The Dave Brubeck Quartet Plays Cole Porter =

Studio album by Dave Brubeck
- Released: 1967
- Recorded: December 8, 1965–February 17, 1966
- Genre: Jazz
- Label: Columbia
- Producer: Teo Macero

Dave Brubeck chronology
Time In (1965)	Anything Goes! The Dave Brubeck Quartet Plays Cole Porter (1967)	Jackpot! (1967)

Anything Goes! The Dave Brubeck Quartet Plays Cole Porter is a 1967 studio album by Dave Brubeck and his quartet of music by Cole Porter, recorded between December 8, 1965 and February 17, 1966.

== Reception ==
Professional ratings
Review scores
Source	Rating
Allmusic	2.5/5 stars

The initial Billboard magazine review from February 18, 1967 commented that "Cole Porter's songs easily fit into the jazz treatment offered by the Dave Brubeck Quartet...The album has a pop potential, too".

The album was reviewed by Scott Yanow at Allmusic who wrote "Few surprises occur but the music often swings hard, pianist Brubeck and altoist Paul Desmond take several excellent solos and bassist Eugene Wright and drummer Joe Morello really push the group."

== Track listing ==
1. "Anything Goes" – 5:40
2. "Love for Sale" – 5:18
3. "Night and Day" – 4:55
4. "What Is This Thing Called Love?" – 6:16
5. "I Get a Kick Out of You" – 5:15
6. "Just One of Those Things" – 6:19
7. "You're the Top" – 6:35
8. "All Through the Night" – 8:25
- All compositions by Cole Porter

== Personnel ==
- Dave Brubeck – piano
- Paul Desmond – alto saxophone
- Gene Wright – double bass
- Joe Morello – drums
- Teo Macero – producer
