= Time Out (Dave Brubeck Quartet album) =

Studio album by the Dave Brubeck Quartet
- Released: December 14, 1959
- Recorded: June 25, July 1, and August 18, 1959
- Studios: Columbia 30th Street Studio, New York City
- Genres: Cool jazz; West Coast jazz
- Length: 38:30
- Label: Columbia
- Producer: Teo Macero

Dave Brubeck chronology
The Riddle (1959)	Time Out (1959)	Bernstein Plays Brubeck Plays Bernstein (1961)

Professional ratings
Review scores
Source	Rating
AllMusic	5/5 stars
DownBeat	2/5 stars
The Penguin Guide to Jazz Recordings	4/4 stars
MSN Music (Consumer Guide)	B+
Q	4/5 stars
Tom Hull	A
Uncut	4/5 stars

Time Out is a studio album by the American jazz group the Dave Brubeck Quartet, released in 1959 by Columbia Records. Recorded at Columbia’s 30th Street Studio in New York City, the album is noted for its pioneering use of unconventional time signatures for jazz, including 9/8, 6/4, and 5/4. Musically, it represents a subtle fusion of cool and West Coast influences.

Time Out peaked at number two on the Billboard albums chart and became the first jazz album to sell one million copies. Its standout single, "Take Five", was also the first jazz single to sell over one million copies. By 1963, the album had sold more than 500,000 units, and in 2011, it was certified double platinum by the Recording Industry Association of America, recognizing sales of over two million copies.

The album was inducted into the Grammy Hall of Fame in 2009, and in 2005, it was selected for preservation in the United States National Recording Registry by the Library of Congress as being "culturally, historically, or aesthetically significant".

== Background ==
The album was intended as an experiment using musical styles Brubeck discovered abroad while on a United States Department of State-sponsored tour of Eurasia, such as when he observed in Turkey a group of street musicians performing a traditional Turkish folk song that was played in 9/8 time with subdivisions of 2+2+2+3, a rare meter for Western music.

On the condition that Brubeck's group first record Gone with the Wind (a conventional album of traditional songs of the American South that received negative reviews upon its release), Columbia president Goddard Lieberson took a chance to underwrite and release Time Out. The album produced a Top 40 hit single in "Take Five", composed by Paul Desmond (the only album track not written by Dave Brubeck).

== Music ==
The theme of Time Out is uncommon time signatures.

"Blue Rondo à la Turk" starts in 9/8, with a typically Balkan 2+2+2+3 subdivision into short and long beats (the rhythm of the Turkish zeybek, equivalent of the Greek zeibekiko) as opposed to the more typical way of subdividing 9/8 as 3+3+3, but the saxophone and piano solos are in 4/4. The title plays on Mozart's "Rondo alla Turca" from his Piano Sonata No. 11 and that the band heard the rhythm while traveling in Turkey.

"Strange Meadow Lark" begins with a piano solo that exhibits no clear time signature, but then settles into a fairly ordinary 4/4 swing once the rest of the group joins. "Take Five" is in 5/4 throughout. According to Desmond, "It was never supposed to be a hit. It was supposed to be a Joe Morello drum solo." "Three to Get Ready" begins in waltz-time, after which it begins to alternate between two measures of 3/4 and two of 4/4. "Kathy's Waltz", named after Brubeck's daughter Cathy but misspelled, starts in 4/4, switches to double-waltz time, and finally merges the two. "Everybody's Jumpin'" is mainly in a very flexible 6/4, while "Pick Up Sticks" offers a clear and steady 6/4.

In an article for The Independent, Spencer Leigh speculated that "Kathy's Waltz" inspired the Beatles song "All My Loving" (written by Paul McCartney, credited to Lennon/McCartney). The two songs share similar rhythmic endings to the last phrases of their melodies.

== Legacy ==
The Dave Brubeck Quartet followed Time Out with three similarly named albums that also made use of uncommon time signatures: Time Further Out (1961), Countdown—Time in Outer Space (1962), and Time Changes (1964). Time In (1966), which featured the quartet but was credited only to Brubeck, used more conventional time signatures.

Time Out was one of 50 recordings chosen by the Library of Congress to be added to the National Recording Registry in 2005. It was also listed that year in the book 1001 Albums You Must Hear Before You Die. In 2009, the album was inducted into the Grammy Hall of Fame.

== Reissues ==
In 1997, the album was remastered for compact disc by Legacy Recordings.

In 2009, Legacy Recordings released a special three-disc 50th Anniversary Edition of Time Out. This edition offers a much higher dynamic range than the 1997 remaster. In addition to the complete album, the Legacy Edition includes a bonus disc featuring previously unreleased concert recordings of the same Brubeck Quartet from the 1961, 1963, and 1964 gatherings of Newport Jazz Festival. The Legacy Edition's third disc is a DVD featuring a 30-minute interview with Brubeck in 2003, and an interactive "piano lesson" where the viewer can toggle through four camera angles of Brubeck performing a solo version of "Three to Get Ready".

In 2020, Brubeck's children released the album Time OutTakes on their own record label, Brubeck Editions. The album features alternate takes of "Blue Rondo a la Turk", "Strange Meadowlark", "Take Five", "Three to Get Ready", and "Kathy's Waltz" (now billed as "Cathy's Waltz"), as well as two songs from the same sessions that had not been included on the album, a cover of "I'm In a Dancing Mood" (which Brubeck had previously covered, live and on the album Dave Brubeck and Jay & Kai at Newport) and "Watusi Jam" (a take on Brubeck's composition "Watusi Drums"). The release was chosen as a Critics Pick by The New York Times.

== Track listing ==
All tracks are written by Dave Brubeck, except where noted.

Side one
No.	Title	Writer(s)	Length
1.	"Blue Rondo à la Turk"		6:44
2.	"Strange Meadow Lark"	Dave Brubeck, Iola Brubeck	7:22
3.	"Take Five"	Paul Desmond	5:24

Side two
No.	Title	Length
4.	"Three to Get Ready"	5:24
5.	"Kathy's Waltz"	4:48
6.	"Everybody's Jumpin'"	4:23
7.	"Pick Up Sticks"	4:16

2009 bonus tracks - The Dave Brubeck Quartet Live at Newport, 1961, 1963, 1964
No.	Title	Writer(s)	Length
8.	"St. Louis Blues"	W. C. Handy	7:55
9.	"Waltz Limp"		4:57
10.	"Since Love Had Its Way"		6:19
11.	"Koto Song"		6:00
12.	"Pennies from Heaven"	Arthur Johnston, Johnny Burke	4:49
13.	"You Go to My Head"	J. Fred Coots, Haven Gillespie	9:36
14.	"Blue Rondo à La Turk"		7:22
15.	"Take Five"	Desmond	7:18

== Personnel ==
The Dave Brubeck Quartet

- Dave Brubeck—piano
- Paul Desmond—alto saxophone
- Eugene Wright—bass
- Joe Morello—drums

Production

- Teo Macero—producer
- Pat Maher—engineer
- Fred Plaut—engineer
- S. Neil Fujita—cover artwork
- Seth Rothstein—project director
- Russell Gloyd—reissue producer
- Mark Wilder—reissue remastering
- Cozbi Sanchez-Cabrera—reissue art direction
- Jeff Powell—2024 vinyl reissue lacquer cutter

== Charts ==
Album Billboard (United States)

Year	Chart	Position
1961	Pop Albums	2

Time Out peaked at No. 2 the week of November 27, 1961 on the Billboard Monaural LPs chart, behind only Judy at Carnegie Hall by Judy Garland.

Singles Billboard (United States)

Year	Single	Chart	Position
1961	"Take Five"	Adult Contemporary	5
1961	"Take Five"	Pop Singles	25

Sales and certifications

Time Out was the first jazz album to sell more than a million copies. The album was certified platinum in 1997 and double platinum in 2011. The single, "Take Five", also sold over a million.

Country	Certification	Sales
United States	2× Platinum	2,000,000+
