= Jazz Impressions of Japan =

Studio album by The Dave Brubeck Quartet
- Released: August 10, 1964
- Recorded: June 16–17, 1964; CBS 30th Street Studio, New York City
- Genre: Jazz
- Length: 35:00
- Labels: Columbia; CS 9012
- Producer: Teo Macero

The Dave Brubeck Quartet chronology
Dave Brubeck in Berlin (1963)	Jazz Impressions of Japan (1964)	Jazz Impressions of New York (1964)

Professional ratings
Review scores
Source	Rating
Allmusic	4/5 stars
The Penguin Guide to Jazz Recordings	4/4 stars

Jazz Impressions of Japan is a 1964 album by The Dave Brubeck Quartet. It was recorded on June 16–17, 1964 at the CBS 30th Street Studio, except for "Zen Is When" which was recorded on January 30, 1960. It was released on August 10, 1964. The album, as the back cover of the remastered CD confirms, had been long out-of-print until it was reissued on CD in 2001, then re-released in 2008 and 2009.

In the album booklet, Brubeck talks about the quartet's trip to Japan and provides poignant and interesting information for each piece of the album, explaining what inspired a certain piece, for instance. In fact, the album is a sort of trip diary. This is how Brubeck himself describes the project: "The tunes in this album are personal impressions from the Quartet's tour of Japan, Spring 1964. No one in a brief visit can hope to absorb and comprehend all that is strange to him. Sights and sounds, exotic in their freshness, arouse the senses to a new awareness. The music we have prepared tries to convey these minute but lasting impressions, wherein the poet expects the reader to feel the scene himself as an experience. The poem suggests the feeling."

"Koto Song" is the only piece from the album that became a Brubeck standard; he would record it numerous times in the following years.

== Track listing ==
All pieces by Dave Brubeck, except where noted.

1. "Tokyo Traffic" 5:52
2. "Rising Sun" 4:42
3. "Toki's Theme" (From the CBS-TV series Mr. Broadway) 2:10
4. "Fujiyama" 5:05
5. "Zen Is When" (Bud Freeman, Leon Pober) 2:53
6. "The City Is Crying" 6:02
7. "Osaka Blues" 5:10
8. "Koto Song" 3:02

== Personnel ==
- Dave Brubeck - piano
- Paul Desmond - saxophone
- Eugene Wright - bass
- Joe Morello - drums
