= Allá en el Rancho Grande (song) =

Song by Elvis Presley

from the album Walk a Mile in My Shoes: The Essential '70s Masters (box set)
- Written: 1920s
- Released: 1995 (on the box set Walk a Mile in My Shoes: The Essential '70s Masters)
- Recorded: July 15, 1970
- Genre: Country rock, rockabilly, ranchera
- Length: 2:04
- Label: RCA Records
- Songwriters: Silvano Ramos; Emilio D Uranga (music); J Del Moral (Spanish lyrics); Bartley Costello (English lyrics)

"Allá en el Rancho Grande" is a Mexican song. It was written in the 1920s for a musical theatrical work, but now is most commonly associated with the eponymous 1936 Mexican motion picture Allá en el Rancho Grande, in which it was sung by renowned actor and singer Tito Guízar and with mariachis.

Bing Crosby recorded the song on April 3, 1939 as "El Rancho Grande" and it reached the No. 6 spot in the charts during a ten-week stay in 1939. Crosby recorded the song again in 1954 for the album Bing: A Musical Autobiography.

The song was featured in the film Mexicali Rose (1939) starring Gene Autry. Autry recorded it on March 12, 1940, and it was released on Vocalion Records No. 5513 on August 20, 1940, peaking at no. 11.

Others to record the song are Al Bowlly (as "Give Me My Ranch"), Artie Shaw, Dave Brubeck (on his Bravo! Brubeck! album) and Dean Martin (on his Dino Latino album).

In 1958 the song was covered by Rex Allen on his album Mister Cowboy on the Decca record label.

Elvis Presley sang the song when playing around at the rehearsals for the documentary film That's the Way It Is (on Wednesday, July 15, 1970). His performance was recorded and, in 1995, released by BMG on the box set Walk a Mile in My Shoes: The Essential '70s Masters.

== Musical style ==
The song is a typical ranchera, with mariachi choruses and lyrics dealing with life in a traditional Mexican ranch. The American arrangement of the song was copyrighted as a "rumba", a term largely used in the US to denote Americanized Afro-Cuban and Latin ballroom music According to the book The Course of Mexican Music,

The song "Allá en el rancho grande" has become a staple of contemporary mariachi repertory, an iconic example of the ranchera music genre, with its signature "oom-pah" accompaniment performed in a lively duple meter. The song follows a strophic verse-chorus format that beckons listeners to sing along.

== Track listing of Presley CD ==
Elvis la canta a Mexico "Allá en el Rancho Grande" (promo CD, 1998, BMG Entertainment Mexico, S.A. De C.V.)

1. "Allá en el Rancho Grande"
2. "Guadalajara"
3. "México"
