= Bravo! Brubeck! =

Live album by Dave Brubeck
- Released: July 17, 1967
- Recorded: May 12–14, 1967 in Mexico City, Mexico
- Genre: Jazz
- Length: 50:37
- Label: Columbia
- Producer: Teo Macero

Dave Brubeck chronology
| Jackpot! (1965) | Bravo! Brubeck! (1967) | Buried Treasures (1967) |

Bravo! Brubeck! is a 1967 live album by Dave Brubeck and his quartet, recorded during their tour of Mexico. The quartet were augmented by Chamin Correa on guitar, and the bongo and conga player Salvador Agüero (Rabito). It was released in 1967.

A second live album recorded on their tour, Buried Treasures, was released in 1998.

The album peaked at 9 on the Billboard Top Jazz Albums chart.

== Reception ==
Professional ratings
Review scores
| Source | Rating |
|---|---|
| Allmusic | 4/5 stars |
| The Penguin Guide to Jazz Recordings | 3/4 stars |

The album was reviewed by Scott Yanow at Allmusic who wrote that "One of the better Dave Brubeck LPs from the later period of the Quartet with altoist Paul Desmond, this set is unusual in that it only contains one Brubeck original. ...The results are melodic but swinging treatments of a variety of famous themes".

== Track listing ==
1. Introduction – 1:18
2. "Cielito Lindo" (Traditional) – 5:01
3. "La Paloma Azul (The Blue Dove)" (Traditional) – 6:16
4. "Sobre las Olas (Over the Waves)" (Juventino Rosas) – 3:17
5. "Besame Mucho" (Sunny Skylar, Consuelo Velázquez) – 5:53
6. "Nostalgia de Mexico" (Dave Brubeck) – 4:03
7. "Poinciana" (Buddy Bernier, Nat Simon) – 6:43
8. "Alla en el Rancho Grande" (Emilio de Uranga) – 3:07
9. "Frenesí" (Alberto Dominguez, Leonard Whitcup) – 5:19
10. "Estrellita (Little Star)" (Manuel Ponce) – 4:50
11. "La Bamba" (Traditional) – 4:50

== Personnel ==
Performance

- Dave Brubeck — piano, arranger, liner notes
- Paul Desmond — alto saxophone
- Chamin Correa — guitar
- Gene Wright — double bass
- Salvatore Agueros — bongo, conga
- Joe Morello — drums
- Teo Macero — producer

Production

- Steven Berkowitz, Patti Matheny — A&R
- Howard Fitzson — art direction
- Randall Martin — design, reissue design
- Seth Rothstein — director
- Nicholas Bennett — packaging manager
- Don Hunstein, Hank Parker — photography
- Didier C. Deutsch, Russell Gloyd — reissue producer
- Teo Macero — original recording producer
- John Jackson — production assistant
- Howard Fritzson — reissue art
- Darcy Proper — remastering, remixing
