= Countdown—Time in Outer Space =

Studio album by Dave Brubeck Quartet
- Released: 1962
- Recorded: May 3, 1961 – February 12, 1962
- Genre: Cool jazz
- Length: 37:52
- Label: Columbia
- Producer: Teo Macero

Professional ratings
Review scores
| Source | Rating |
|---|---|
| Allmusic | 4/5 stars |
| Louise D. Stone (The Afro-American) | 4/5 stars |
| Down Beat | 4/5 stars |

Countdown—Time in Outer Space is a studio album released by the Dave Brubeck Quartet in 1962 on Columbia LP record CS 8575 (stereo) and CL 1775 (mono). The front cover features the 1959 painting Orange and Black Wall by Franz Kline. In Australia the album appeared on the Coronet label. It was re-released, for the first time in digital format, in 2004 as part of a compact disc collection titled Dave Brubeck: For All Time. It was again released as part of the box set The Dave Brubeck Quartet: the Columbia Studio Albums Collection 1955–1966. Both CD re-releases feature a bonus track titled "Fatha".

== Recording ==
Dedicated to astronaut John Glenn the album was another in a series of concept albums studying the exploration of unusual meters and polytonality within a jazz context. Recorded between May 3, 1961 and February 12, 1962, it was put on tape in many of the same sessions that appear on Time Further Out. Brubeck encouraged the quartet members towards the development of new time signatures for this album. The first track, "Countdown", is based on a typical "8 to the bar" boogie, stride piano in the manner of Earl Hines or Teddy Wilson, but with two extra notes added in, giving a meter count of 10. Michael Katzif considers the track so smoothly played that some people may be unaware of the unusual time signature. "Eleven Four" uses a pattern of five beats, then two sets of three to create the feel of 11/4. In the track "Why Phillis" some players stick to 3/4 time, others adhere to 4/4, while others move between the time signatures. "Someday My Prince Will Come" had been previously recorded by the Quartet, juxtaposing triple and quadruple meters in the album Dave Digs Disney, but the track was re-done on this album to further realize the rhythmic possibilities of poly-rhythm, including adding a rhythm of 2/4 to the mix. "Castilian Blues" and "Castilian Drums" have time signatures of 5/4, the latter being unsurprisingly a percussion showpiece. The next four tracks, "Fast Life", "Waltz Limp", "Three's a Crowd", and "Danse Duet" were written for a ballet entitled "Maiden in the Tower". Different characters in the performance have themes with different time signatures, and as they interact the interplay and contrasts of the various rhythms are paraded. The album's final track, as originally issued, is a standard blues in 4/4 time, hence the title "Back to Earth".

== Reception ==
On release, Billboard expected the album to be "another smash" because of the "persuasive and exciting performances". Both the monaural and stereo version appeared on the respective Billboard charts. Countdown's first appearance on the Billboard chart was on June 16, 1962. It reached a peak position of No. 24 and remained on the chart for 21 weeks. The St. Petersburg Times called the album "modern jazz at its finest." Louise Stone recommended the album but found it inferior to Brubeck's Fantasy recordings and Jazz Goes to College. The album has been cited as a superior example of utilizing "off" time signatures. The Age stated that the album "breaks new ground." The Seattle Post-Intelligencer called it one of Brubeck's most creative records.

== Track listing ==
All tracks are written by Dave Brubeck except where noted

| No. | Title | Writer(s) | Recording date | Length |
|---|---|---|---|---|
| 1. | "Countdown" | | February 12, 1962 | 2:23 |
| 2. | "Eleven Four" | Paul Desmond | May 25, 1961 | 2:48 |
| 3. | "Why Phillis" | Eugene Wright | June 28, 1961 | 2:17 |
| 4. | "Someday My Prince Will Come" | Frank Churchill, Larry Morey | January 12, 1962 | 6:22 |
| 5. | "Castilian Blues" | | May 3, 1961 | 2:33 |
| 6. | "Castilian Drums" | | May 3, 1961 | 3:52 |
| 7. | "Fast Life" | | June 28, 1961 | 2:57 |
| 8. | "Waltz Limp" | | May 3, 1961 | 4:14 |
| 9. | "Three's a Crowd" | | June 2, 1961 | 2:41 |
| 10. | "Danse Duet" | | June 28, 1961 | 3:45 |
| 11. | "Back to Earth" | | December 16, 1961 | 3:16 |
| Total length: | | | | 37:52 |

=== CD bonus track ===
| No. | Title | Length |
|---|---|---|
| 1. | "Fatha" | 3:47 |

== Personnel ==
- Dave Brubeck – piano
- Paul Desmond – alto saxophone
- Eugene Wright – bass
- Joe Morello – drums
