= Unsquare Dance =

Single by Dave Brubeck

from the album Time Further Out
- B-side: "Camptown Races"
- Released: 1961
- Recorded: 1961
- Genre: Jazz
- Length: 2:00
- Label: CBS
- Songwriter: Dave Brubeck
- Producer: Teo Macero

Official audio
- "Unsquare Dance" on YouTube

"Unsquare Dance" is a composition by jazz pianist Dave Brubeck that was released as a single in 1961. Included on Brubeck's album Time Further Out, the piece reached No. 93 on the Cash Box chart on December 16, 1961.

== Overview ==
Written in 7/4 time, the piece is an example of Dave Brubeck's exploration of time signatures that were uncommon in jazz music of the era. According to Brubeck, it was written during a single trip from his home to the recording studio and was recorded the same day. The composition is based on a blues structure but also has a distinct country and western feel, as implied in the title (a square dance being a fixture of western US culture). "Unsquare Dance" is driven by a strong bass figure, with percussion provided primarily by the rim of the snare drum and hand claps. It combines duple and triple meter.

Sample
Third measure with initial theme development (time 0:22 to 0:34)

The piano enters with descending phrases crossing the 7/4 rhythm. The speed of the piece gradually increases from start to finish. The main theme then develops initially without left accompaniment and then with a characteristic figure based around the use of tenths. A drum solo using rim clicks follows, then a restatement of the theme and a distinctive conclusion.

Brubeck says in his liner notes:

"Unsquare Dance", in 7/4 time, is a challenge to the foot-tappers, finger-snappers and hand-clappers. Deceitfully simple, it refuses to be squared. And the laugh you hear at the end is Joe Morello's guffaw of surprise and relief that we had managed to get through the difficult last chorus.

== Chart performance ==
"Unsquare Dance" was included on the album Time Further Out and became a hit single, peaking at No. 74 on the U.S. Billboard Hot 100 and No. 14 on the U.K.'s Record Retailer chart.
