= Bob Bates (musician) =

American jazz bassist

- Born: September 1, 1923; Pocatello, Idaho, U.S.
- Died: September 13, 1981 (aged 58); San Francisco, California, U.S.
- Genres: Jazz
- Instrument: Double bass

Bob Bates (September 1, 1923 – September 13, 1981) was an American jazz bassist.

== Early life ==
Bates was born in Pocatello, Idaho. His mother was an organist, while his brothers Norman and Jim were also bassists. As a youth, he played tuba, trumpet, and trombone. He then studied classical bass from 1944 to 1948 and played with Sonny Dunham in 1946 and 1947. Bates began performing with Jack Fina in the late 1940s.

== Career ==
Early in the 1950s, Bates played in the Two Beaux & a Peep Trio. He was the bassist in the popular Dave Brubeck Quartet between 1953 and 1955. In addition to Brubeck, Bates also recorded with Paul Desmond in 1954, and Dave Pell in 1956. He stopped playing at around this time.

== Personal life ==
Bates died in 1981 in San Francisco, at the age of 58.

== Discography ==
With Dave Brubeck

- Dave Brubeck at Storyville: 1954 (Columbia, 1954)
- Jazz Goes to College (Columbia, 1954)
- Brubeck Time (Columbia, 1954)
- Jazz: Red Hot and Cool (Columbia, 1954–55)

With Paul Desmond

- Desmond (Fantasy, 1954)

With Dave Pell

- Jazz Goes Dancing (1956)
