= Things Ain't What They Used to Be =

1942 jazz standard by Mercer Ellington and Ted Persons

Single by Johnny Hodges and Orchestra
- B-side: "Squaty Roo"
- Released: March 20, 1942
- Genre: jazz standard
- Length: 3:37
- Label: Bluebird
- Composer: Mercer Ellington
- Lyricist: Ted Persons

"Things Ain't What They Used to Be" is a 1942 jazz standard with music by Mercer Ellington and lyrics by Ted Persons.

== Background ==
In 1941 there was a strike against the American Society of Composers, Authors and Publishers, of which Duke Ellington was a member. Because of the strike he could not air his songs on the radio. Instead, he used songs written by his son Mercer and pianist Billy Strayhorn. Strayhorn's compositions of this time include "Take the 'A' Train", "Chelsea Bridge" and "Day Dream". Mercer wrote "Things Ain't What They Used to Be", "Blue Serge" and "Moon Mist".

Jazz musician and historian Chris Tyle argues that most likely Mercer Ellington came up with the melody and his father then arranged the song for the band. The song is most often played as an instrumental. Lyrics were written by Ted Persons. Johnny Hodges played it first, in Hollywood on July 3, 1941.

== Other versions ==
- Charlie Barnet and His Orchestra (1942). This version went to number eight on the Harlem Hit Parade chart.
- Duke Ellington – Piano Reflections (1953)
- Dave Brubeck - Newport 1958 (1958)
- Charles Mingus – Mingus Dynasty (1960)
- Oscar Peterson with Dizzy Gillespie, Clark Terry, and Eddie Lockjaw Davis – Oscar Peterson Jam/Montreux 77 (1977)

== Popular culture ==
- Duke Ellington played it for the film Cabin in the Sky (1943).
- An instrumental version was frequently played as the closing music for The Tonight Show Starring Johnny Carson by The Tonight Show Band under the direction of Doc Severinsen.
