= Brubeck Time =

Studio album by the Dave Brubeck Quartet
- Released: February 14, 1955
- Recorded: October 12–14 and November 10, 1954
- Studio: Columbia 30th Street (New York City)
- Genre: Jazz
- Length: 40:00
- Label: Columbia
- Producer: George Avakian

The Dave Brubeck Quartet chronology
| Jazz Goes to College (1954) | Brubeck Time (1955) | Jazz: Red Hot and Cool (1955) |

Professional ratings
Review scores
| Source | Rating |
|---|---|
| AllMusic | 4/5 stars |
| The Penguin Guide to Jazz Recordings | 3.5/4 stars |

Brubeck Time is a jazz album by the Dave Brubeck Quartet, a rare studio recording from that period of the band, when it was recording mostly live albums. It was recorded in the fall of 1954, and originally released in 1955 under the Columbia label as CL 622. In 1968, Columbia re-channeled the album for stereo and re-released it as Instant Brubeck under the Harmony label as HS 11253. It was later re-released again on CD in 1991 under the title Interchanges '54 as CK 47032, with the addition of four tracks from Jazz: Red Hot and Cool.

The album features one of the earlier Quartet lineups, with Bob Bates on bass and Joe Dodge on drums. Although now not as famous as some of the band's other albums, in retrospect it has a lot of depth, and those interested in jazz will find it "certainly worth acquiring".

According to a 1955 letter written by Avakian to Brubeck, the cover was "designed around the Boris Artzybasheff painting which was on Time magazine's cover of November 8th [1954]".

== The pieces ==
Most of the pieces in the album are old standards revisited by the quartet. Notable among them is a sparkling and very lively rendition of "Keepin' Out of Mischief Now". There are two original compositions: "Audrey" and "Stompin' for Mili".

=== Audrey ===
This piece was meant to contrast the excitement of "Stompin' For Mili". Brubeck recalls the recording of the piece in a 1955 letter:" 'I would like,' said Gjon [Mili], closing his eyes and raising his hand expressively, 'I would like to see Audrey Hepburn come walking through the woods.' 'Gee,' said Paul wistfully, 'So would I.' 'One,' I said, noticing the glazed expression about Paul's eyes 'two, three, four'. And we played it. Hence, the title."

The piece is a 12-bar blues in the key of B-flat minor; however, the melody of "Balcony Rock", an improvised blues in B-flat Major, recorded on Jazz Goes to College, is used to conclude "Audrey".

There is an "alternate take", released as "Makin' Time", that is rarely heard. It was released on a Columbia compilation LP called I Like Jazz! around 1955.

=== "Stompin' for Mili" ===
This song was recorded for photographer Gjon Mili. Mili had agreed very reluctantly to film the Quartet at work, and the band felt "on pretty shaky ground" at the session. Their first attempt to record was, as a result, very tentative, and Mili's dismissive pronouncement after this "take" made Brubeck's "blood [begin] to boil". The resulting second "take", heard on the album, was an "expression of rage and frustration".

The piece was a development from the classic live recording of Give a Little Whistle/ Oh Lady Be Good in the 1953 Fantasy album Jazz at Storyville, the newer version alternating from major to minor tone during Brubeck's solo. The version of Give a Little Whistle included on the album Jazz at the College of the Pacific vol.2, also recorded in 1953, but issued only in 2002, clearly shows the progression of the original version of Give a Little Whistle/ Oh Lady Be Good into Stomping for Mili, alternating from major to minor tone during the improvised solos by Brubeck and Desmond.

== Chart performance ==
The album peaked at No. 5 on the Billboard Best-Selling Popular Albums chart, during an eleven-week run on it. It was Brubeck's best charting album ever.

== Track listing ==
1. "Audrey" (Brubeck, Desmond) – 3:35
2. "Jeepers Creepers" (Johnny Mercer, Harry Warren) – 4:57
3. "Pennies From Heaven" (Johnny Burke, Arthur Johnston) – 6:28
4. "Why Do I Love You?" (Jerome Kern, Oscar Hammerstein II) – 5:42
5. "Stompin' for Mili" (Brubeck, Desmond) – 5:27
6. "Keepin' Out of Mischief Now" (Andy Razaf, Fats Waller) – 5:06
7. "A Fine Romance" (Jerome Kern, Dorothy Fields) – 3:48
8. "Brother, Can You Spare a Dime?" (Edgar Yipsel Harburg, Jay Gorney) – 5:17

Tracks 1, 2, 7 recorded on October 12, 1954; tracks 5, 8 recorded on October 13; tracks 3, 4 recorded on October 14; track 6 recorded on November 10, 1954.

== Personnel ==
- Dave Brubeck - piano
- Paul Desmond - alto sax
- Bob Bates - double bass
- Joe Dodge - drums

=== Technical personnel ===
- George Avakian – producer
- Nicholas Bennett – packaging manager
- Steven Berkowitz – A&R
- Didier C. Deutsch – producer, reissue producer
- Howard Fritzson – art direction
- Russell Gloyd – producer, reissue producer
- John Jackson – production assistant
- Randall Martin – design
- Patti Matheny – A&R
- Seth Rothstein – director
- Mark Wilder – remixing, remastering
