= The Last Time We Saw Paris =

Live album by Dave Brubeck
- Released: 1968
- Recorded: 1967 in Paris, France
- Genre: Jazz
- Length: 48:56
- Label: Columbia
- Producer: Teo Macero

Dave Brubeck chronology
Buried Treasures (1967)	The Last Time We Saw Paris (1968)	Compadres (1968)

The Last Time We Saw Paris is a 1968 live album by Dave Brubeck and his quartet, recorded in Paris during their final tour.

== Reception ==
Professional ratings
Review scores
Source	Rating
Allmusic	4.5/5 stars

The initial Billboard review of the album from 29 June 1968 felt that "Brubeck fans will cherish this one...The improvisations of "Swanee River" are provocative and imaginative".

The album was reviewed by Scott Yanow at Allmusic who wrote that "this LP is full of timeless performances". Yanow also felt that "Throughout these extended renditions, Brubeck and altoist Paul Desmond rekindle some of the magic from their concerts of the early '50s while also simultaneously showing just how far they had grown as musicians".

== Track listing ==
1. "Swanee River" (Stephen Foster, Dave Brubeck) – 8:47
2. "These Foolish Things (Remind Me of You)" (Eric Maschwitz, Jack Strachey, Harry Link) – 12:21
3. "Forty Days" (Brubeck) – 7:41
4. "One Moment Worth Years" (Brubeck) – 8:03
5. "La Paloma Azul (The Blue Dove)" (Traditional) – 6:54
6. "Three to Get Ready" (Brubeck) – 5:10

== Personnel ==
- Dave Brubeck - piano, arranger, liner notes
- Paul Desmond - alto saxophone
- Gene Wright - double bass
- Joe Morello - drums
- Teo Macero - producer
- Iola Brubeck - liner notes
- Arthur Kendy - engineer
