= Jazz Goes to College =

1954 live album by the Dave Brubeck Quartet

Live album by The Dave Brubeck Quartet
- Released: June 7, 1954
- Recorded: 1954
- Genres: Cool jazz, West Coast jazz
- Length: 51:46
- Label: Columbia
- Producer: George Avakian

The Dave Brubeck Quartet chronology
Paul and Dave's Jazz Interwoven (1954)	Jazz Goes to College (1954)	Brubeck Time (1955)

Original LP Cover
- Alternate LP cover

Jazz Goes to College is a 1954 album documenting the North American college tour of the Dave Brubeck Quartet. It was Dave Brubeck's first album for Columbia Records. He was joined by alto saxophonist Paul Desmond, double bassist Bob Bates, and drummer Joe Dodge. The album was re-released on CD and cassette in the Columbia Jazz Masterpieces (CBS Jazz Masterpieces in Europe) series in 1989 and on CD by Sony International in 2000.

== Background ==
The college tour, in which the group crossed the country visiting major universities and junior colleges, was conceived by Brubeck's wife Iola as a way to introduce jazz to a new audience. Brubeck described encountering resistance at the colleges, some of which were reluctant to allow him to perform, but found following initial forays that the quartet was in much demand. As the quartet traveled across the country, he told the Jazz Education Journal, they would play as many as 90 colleges in a four-month period.

== Composition ==
"Balcony Rock", recorded at the University of Michigan in Ann Arbor, is a heavily improvised tune formed on an eight-bar blues led by alto saxophonist Paul Desmond. "Out of Nowhere" was recorded at the University of Cincinnati and showcases Brubeck's timing, with passages that veer from atonal to melodic. Recorded at Oberlin College, "Le Souk" features aggressive, frenetic piano by Brubeck, Bob Bates' propulsive double bass lines, and a firm backbeat by drummer Joe Dodge. Desmond's melodies feature Middle Eastern influences.

"Take the 'A' Train" has straightforward blows by Desmond and forceful interjections by Dodge. "The Song Is You" showcases Desmond's lithe phrasing. The quartet's reading of "Don't Worry 'Bout Me" expands on Brubeck's bluesy piano with an austere arrangement. The final phrase of "I Want to Be Happy" exemplifies the quartet's energetic performance with a dramatic conclusion.

== Release and reception ==
Retrospective professional reviews
Review scores
Source	Rating
AllMusic	5/5 stars
MSN Music (Expert Witness)	A
The Penguin Guide to Jazz Recordings	3/4 stars

Following the album's release, the quartet was featured on the cover of Time, with the accompanying article describing Brubeck as "the most exciting new jazz artist at work today". Jazz Goes to College enjoyed widespread popularity among college students in the 1950s and early 1960s. It was Columbia's fourth-best-selling pop album of 1954.

In a retrospective five-star review, AllMusic's Lindsay Planer called the album a "perfect representation of the Dave Brubeck Quartet's pre-Time Out (1959) antics in the preferable concert performance setting", and wrote that the quartet's "support of Brubeck is uniformly flawless, ultimately producing what many consider as the most memorable music in the artist's canon." Samuel Chell of All About Jazz viewed it as an "essential recording" of "Brubeck-Desmond's greatest period, before the comparatively sterile, more formulaic studio albums, including Time Out, and found the music "soulful, in the moment, unrepeatable", writing that "the swing is generated internally and, rather than the body responding with visceral approval, the mind rocks and reels." Robert Christgau, writing for MSN Music, applauded Paul Desmond's contributions and said that, particularly on the album's standards, he is "at his lyrical best". Christgau complimented Brubeck's "blocky" solos because, "in rhythm music, blocky generally beats tinkly."

The album sold well, and peaked at No. 8 on the Billboard Best Selling Popular Albums chart, becoming Brubeck's first album to chart.

== Track listing ==
1. "Balcony Rock" (Dave Brubeck, Paul Desmond) (University of Michigan) – 11:55
2. "Out of Nowhere" (Johnny Green, Edward Heyman) (University of Cincinnati) – 8:04
3. "Le Souk" (Brubeck, Desmond) (Oberlin College) – 4:36
4. "Take the 'A' Train" (Billy Strayhorn) (University of Michigan) – 6:10
5. "The Song Is You" (Oscar Hammerstein II, Jerome Kern) (University of Michigan) – 5:38
6. "Don't Worry 'bout Me" (Rube Bloom, Ted Koehler) (University of Michigan) – 8:47
7. "I Want to Be Happy" (Irving Caesar, Vincent Youmans) (University of Michigan) – 6:36

Notes

- Location of recording included in parentheses following composer.
- Track 3 recorded on April 14, 1954; track 4 on March 26 of the same year; recording dates of the remainder unknown.

== Personnel ==
Credits are adapted from Allmusic.

- George Avakian – liner notes, producer
- Bob Bates – double bass
- Dave Brubeck – piano
- Paul Desmond – alto saxophone
- Joe Dodge – drums
