= Take Five Live =

Live album by Carmen McRae
- Released: 1962
- Recorded: September 6, 1961, Basin Street East, New York City
- Genre: Vocal jazz
- Length: 37:17
- Label: Columbia

Carmen McRae chronology
Carmen McRae Sings Lover Man and Other Billie Holiday Classics (1962)	Take Five Live (1962)	Woman Talk (1966)

Professional ratings
Review scores
Source	Rating
Allmusic	3/5 stars
The Rolling Stone Jazz Record Guide	4/5 stars

Take Five Live is a 1962 live album by American jazz singer Carmen McRae with pianist Dave Brubeck, focusing on interpretations of his songs. This was McRae's second album with Brubeck; their first, Tonight Only with the Dave Brubeck Quartet, was released in 1961.

== Track listing ==
All tracks composed by Dave Brubeck and Iola Brubeck; except where indicated

1. "When I Was Young"
2. "In Your Own Sweet Way"
3. "Too Young for Growing Old"
4. "Ode to a Cowboy"
5. "There'll Be No Tomorrow"
6. "Melanctha" (D. Brubeck, Liz Blake)
7. "It's a Raggy Waltz" (D. Brubeck)
8. "Oh So Blue" (D. Brubeck)
9. "Lord, Lord"
10. "Travellin' Blues"
11. "Take Five" (Paul Desmond, I. Brubeck)
12. "Easy as You Go"

== Personnel ==
- Carmen McRae - vocals

The Dave Brubeck Quartet

(except Paul Desmond - alto saxophone)

- Dave Brubeck - piano
- Gene Wright - double bass
- Joe Morello - drums
