= Gone with the Wind (album) =

Studio album by The Dave Brubeck Quartet
- Released: 1959
- Recorded: Apr 22 & 23, 1959
- Genre: Jazz
- Length: 40:06
- Label: Columbia

The Dave Brubeck Quartet chronology
Jazz Impressions of Eurasia (1958)	Gone with the Wind (1959)	Time Out (1959)

Professional ratings
Review scores
Source	Rating
AllMusic	3/5 stars
The Miami News	(favorable)
Seattle Post-Intelligencer	(neutral)
The Penguin Guide to Jazz Recordings	3/4 stars

Gone with the Wind is a jazz album released by The Dave Brubeck Quartet in 1959 on Columbia CL 1347 (monophonic) and CS 8156 (stereo).

The origin of the album came out of the Quartet's desire to create an album of original music using unusual meters they discovered abroad such as in traditional Turkish folk music, a project which became Time Out. However, the label executives insisted that the band first create a more conventional album to cover the risk of their preferred concept.

The album was recorded in Los Angeles, California on April 22 and 23, 1959. It is a concept album paying tribute to the State of Georgia and to the American South more generally. For this album, the quartet members picked personal favorites. Eugene Wright selected "Ol' Man River". "Short'nin Bread" was a pick of Joe Morello. Favored by Paul Desmond were "Lonesome Road" and "Basin Street" with Dave Brubeck choosing "Georgia on my Mind" along with "Swanee River". The album has received such reviews as "All... you would expect from Dave Brubeck", the "most swinging" album recorded up to that point, and as one of the "classic" Dave Brubeck Quartet lineup's lesser efforts. By contrast, Time Out was highly successful and eventually hailed as a landmark achievement in the genre.

== Track listing ==
No.	Title	Writer(s)	Length
1.	"Swanee River"	Stephen Foster	5:55
2.	"The Lonesome Road"	Gene Austin, Nat Shilkret	7:35
3.	"Georgia on My Mind"	Hoagy Carmichael, Stuart Gorrell	6:36
4.	"Camptown Races"	Stephen Foster	1:59
5.	"Camptown Races" (Alternate take)	Stephen Foster	2:09
6.	"Short'nin' Bread"	James Whitcomb Riley	2:29
7.	"Basin Street Blues"	Spencer Williams	4:33
8.	"Ol' Man River"	Oscar Hammerstein II, Jerome Kern	2:28
9.	"Gone with the Wind"	Herbert Magidson, Allie Wrubel	6:22

== Personnel ==
The Dave Brubeck Quartet:

- Paul Desmond - alto sax
- Joe Morello - drums
- Gene Wright - bass
- Dave Brubeck - piano
