= One Song (Disney song) =

Song by Harry Stockwell

from the album Snow White and the Seven Dwarfs
- Recorded: 1937
- Genre: Soundtrack; traditional pop
- Length: 1:27
- Label: Walt Disney
- Composer: Frank Churchill
- Lyricist: Larry Morey

"One Song" is a song from Walt Disney's 1937 animated movie Snow White and the Seven Dwarfs.

== Background ==
It was written by Larry Morey (lyrics) and Frank Churchill (music), and performed by Harry Stockwell (the Prince's voice in the movie). It was also featured in the 1979 stage adaptation of the 1937 animated musical movie.

The melody was most likely inspired by a piano composition "Chant sans paroles, Op. 3" by Polish-Russian composer Henryk Pachulski. "One Song" appears in the film four times (including intro), originally being part of a medley along with "I'm Wishing". Since the release of the film, the song has been recorded by many artists, including Henryk Wars and his Orchestra in 1939 and Dave Brubeck on his 1957 album Dave Digs Disney.
