= Newport 1958 (Dave Brubeck album) =

Live album by Dave Brubeck
- Released: 1958
- Recorded: July 3, 1958
- Venue: Newport, Rhode Island and July 28, 1958 in New York City
- Genre: Jazz
- Length: 49:06
- Label: Columbia - CS 8082

Dave Brubeck chronology
Jazz Impressions of Eurasia (1958)	Newport 1958 (1958)	The Dave Brubeck Quartet in Europe (1958)

Newport 1958 is a live album by pianist Dave Brubeck and his quartet recorded at the 1958 Newport Jazz Festival in Rhode Island of music by and associated with Duke Ellington. Several of the tracks were later re-recorded in New York City due to sound problems with the live Newport recordings.

== Reception ==
Professional ratings
Review scores
Source	Rating
Allmusic	4/5 stars

Ken Dryden reviewed the album for Allmusic and wrote that "The inspired choice of "Jump for Joy" makes for some of the most magical moments, while "Perdido" provides an extended workout for Desmond and Brubeck. ...Brubeck's "The Duke," an elegant tribute to Ellington that showcases Desmond's lyrical alto and the exciting finale of "C Jam Blues" (the latter spotlighting Morello are also highlights".

== Track listing ==
1. "Things Ain't What They Used To Be" (Mercer Ellington, Ted Persons) – 6:54
2. "Jump for Joy" (Duke Ellington) – 5:15
3. "Perdido" (Juan Tizol, Ervin Drake, Hans Lengsfelder) – 12:54
4. "Liberian Suite - Dance No.3" (D. Ellington) – 6:24
5. "The Duke" (Dave Brubeck) – 6:23
6. "Flamingo" (Edmund Anderson, Theodor Grouya) – 6:23
7. "C Jam Blues" (D. Ellington) – 4:53

== Personnel ==
- Dave Brubeck – piano
- Paul Desmond – alto saxophone
- Joe Benjamin – double bass
- Joe Morello – drums
- Irving Townsend – liner notes
