= Brandenburg Gate: Revisited =

Live album by The Dave Brubeck Quartet
- Released: 1963
- Recorded: August 21–22, 1961
- Genre: Jazz
- Length: 34:35
- Label: Columbia

The Dave Brubeck Quartet chronology
Brubeck in Amsterdam (1963)	Brandenburg Gate: Revisited (1963)	The Dave Brubeck Quartet at Carnegie Hall (1963)

Brandenburg Gate: Revisited is a studio album by The Dave Brubeck Quartet accompanied by an orchestra arranged by Howard Brubeck.

The album peaked at 137 on the Billboard 200.

== Reception ==
Professional ratings
Review scores
Source	Rating
Allmusic	3.5/5 stars
The Penguin Guide to Jazz Recordings	3.5/4 stars

Billboard magazine featured the album as a "Billboard Spotlight Pick" in their November 23, 1963 issue.

The album was reviewed by Lindsay Planer at Allmusic who wrote with regards the orchestral accompaniment that "...The subtle tension and liberation that exists between the two arguably disparate aggregates prevent either from overpowering the other. Likewise, spirited leads and improvisations from Brubeck and Desmond keep the elaborate piece agile and firmly rooted in jazz." Planer wrote that Desmond on "Summer Song" "...once again reels off impressive lines that never detract from the tastefully understated string augmentation" and of the "G Flat Theme" that "...What begins as dark and melancholy dissipates into a mid-tempo groove that drives both Brubeck and Desmond into some very interesting spaces as they quickly adapt their sound to the slightly noir, but highly memorable chorus."

== Track listing ==
- All music composed by Dave Brubeck except otherwise noted
1. "Brandenburg Gate" - 18:31
2. "Summer Song" - 4:14
3. "In Your Own Sweet Way" - 5:01
4. "G Flat Theme" (Howard Brubeck) - 3:58
5. "Kathy's Waltz" - 3:02

== Personnel ==
- Dave Brubeck - piano
- Paul Desmond - alto saxophone
- Gene Wright - double bass
- Joe Morello - drums
- Unidentified orchestra
- Howard Brubeck - arranger
- Teo Macero - producer
