= Dave Digs Disney =

Studio album by Dave Brubeck Quartet
- Released: 1957
- Recorded: June 29 & 30 and August 8, 1957
- Genre: Jazz
- Length: 50:17 (reissue)
- Label: Columbia
- Producer: George Avakian

Dave Brubeck Quartet chronology
Jazz Impressions of the U.S.A. (1956)	Dave Digs Disney (1957)	Jazz Goes to Junior College (1957)

Professional ratings
Review scores
Source	Rating
Allmusic	4/5 stars
Disc	4.5/5 stars
The Penguin Guide to Jazz Recordings	3/4 stars

Dave Digs Disney is a 1957 studio album by the Dave Brubeck Quartet. It features jazz renditions of songs from the animated Disney films Alice in Wonderland, Pinocchio and Snow White and the Seven Dwarfs. It is one of Brubeck's most popular albums. The album was reissued in 2011, with remastered recordings and two bonus tracks: "Very Good Advice" (from Alice in Wonderland) and "So This Is Love" (from Cinderella).

The original LP was issued only in mono, though stereo tapes were recorded at the time. The stereo mixes of the album's tracks were not widely available until later re-releases.

== Production ==
Brubecks’s quartet had integrated occasional Disney songs into their live performances for some time, but it took a family trip to Disneyland to convince Brubeck to call up his producer and pitch his idea of an album devoted to Disney songs.

At the time, Disney songs were often considered light pop material below the talents of jazz musicians, yet Brubeck took a financial risk on the album and it paid off. Later, other jazz artists would record Disney songs as well. "Someday My Prince Will Come" most notably became a jazz standard, and was later recorded by Miles Davis and John Coltrane, among others.

== Track listing ==
All tracks written by Frank Churchill and Larry Morey except where noted.

1. "Alice in Wonderland" (Sammy Fain, Bob Hilliard) – 9:24
2. "Give A Little Whistle" (Leigh Harline, Ned Washington) – 7:32
3. "Heigh-Ho (The Dwarfs' Marching Song)" – 3:53
4. "When You Wish Upon A Star" (Leigh Harline, Ned Washington) – 4:49
5. "Some Day My Prince Will Come" – 8:15
6. "One Song" – 4:56

Reissue Bonus Tracks

7. "Very Good Advice" (Sammy Fain, Bob Hilliard) – 5:31
8. "So This Is Love" (Mack David, Al Hoffman, Jerry Livingston) – 5:56

== Personnel ==
- Dave Brubeck - piano
- Paul Desmond - alto saxophone
- Joe Morello - drums
- Norman Bates - bass
