= Jazz Impressions of New York =

Jazz Impressions Of New York

Studio album by Dave Brubeck
- Released: 1965
- Recorded: June 16 to August 21, 1964
- Genre: Jazz
- Length: 44:37
- Label: Columbia
- Producer: Teo Macero, Amy Herot (reissue)

Dave Brubeck chronology
Jazz Impressions of Japan (1964)	Jazz Impressions Of New York (1965)	Angel Eyes (1965)

Professional ratings
Review scores
Source	Rating
AllMusic	2/5 stars
The Penguin Guide to Jazz Recordings	2.5/4 stars

Jazz Impressions of New York is a jazz album released by Dave Brubeck. The compositions were for the television show Mr. Broadway.

Brubeck's theme music was written to convey the "urbane personality" of the main character, yet be "a signature immediately recognizable as Brubeck." The tune has the urgent, polyrhythmic feel of many of Brubeck's other adventures in 3/4 time.

The quartet contained Paul Desmond on alto saxophone, Eugene Wright on acoustic bass, and Joe Morello on drums. However, there were some changes and additions on the final track, "Upstage Rumba", as Brubeck explained:

The Quartet version of this piece actually evolved in the studio when each person upstaged the other by unexpectedly doing something quite out of character. Paul Desmond surprised us first by making his debut on a bass marimba which had been left in the studio from a Latin band session. Then, people came running out of the control booth and, in quite an uncontrollable manner, grabbed the nearest percussion instrument and began to play. My brother Howard was shaking some sort of cylindrical drum with BBs in it; John Lee, a drummer friend of Joe Morello, played on Joe's tom-tom; and Teo Macero, our producer, was master of the claves until he dropped them at the end of the piece (which I consider a final stroke of upstage chicanery).

== Chart performance ==
The album debuted on Billboard magazine's Top LP's chart in the issue dated February 27, 1965, and remained on the chart for four weeks, peaking at number 142.

== Track listing ==
1. "Theme from Mr. Broadway" – 2:30
2. "Broadway Bossa Nova" – 3:16
3. "Autumn In Washington Square" – 5:30
4. "Something to Sing About" – 3:56
5. "Sixth Sense" – 6:57
6. "Spring In Central Park" – 2:29
7. "Lonely Mr. Broadway" – 4:20
8. "Summer on the Sound" – 2:43
9. "Winter Ballad" – 2:45
10. "Broadway Romance" – 5:52
11. "Upstage Rumba" – 4:19

== Charts ==
Chart (1965)	Peak position
US Billboard Top LPs	142
