= Eugene Wright =

American jazz bassist (1923–2020)

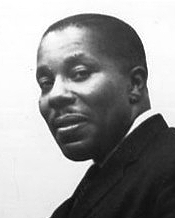
- Wright in 1962

Background information
- Born: Eugene Joseph Wright; May 29, 1923; Chicago, Illinois, U.S.
- Died: December 30, 2020 (aged 97) Los Angeles, California, U.S.
- Genre: Jazz
- Occupation: Musician
- Instrument: Double bass
- Years active: 1958–2020
- Label: Columbia
- Formerly of: The Dave Brubeck Quartet

Eugene Joseph Wright (May 29, 1923 – December 30, 2020) was an American jazz bassist who was a member of the Dave Brubeck Quartet.

== Biography ==
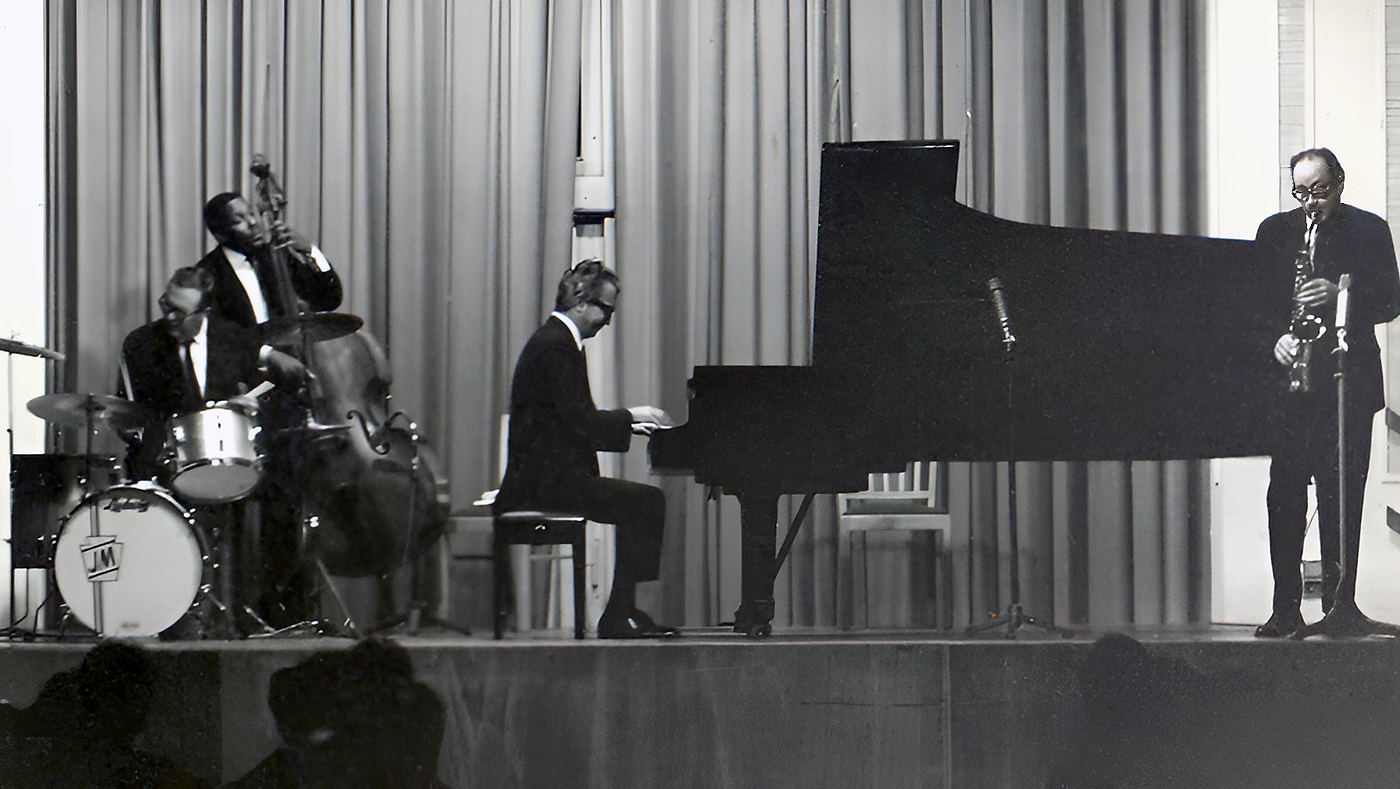
Wright (at left with bass) performing with the Dave Brubeck Quartet in West Germany, 1967.

Wright was born in Chicago, Illinois. He was a cornetist at high school and led the 16-piece band Dukes of Swing in his 20s. He was largely self-taught on bass until his early 30s, when he studied privately with Paul Gregory and others. Walter Page was Wright's idol.

He became more successful at the peak of the swing era, with bandleaders including Count Basie and Erroll Garner. Playing with Billie Holiday and Charlie Parker, after the swing era ended, he demonstrated his versatility in bebop with such musicians as Sonny Stitt as well as in Latin jazz with Cal Tjader.

He also played with Lonnie Simmons, Gene Ammons, and Arnett Cobb in the late 1940s and early 1950s, then worked with Buddy DeFranco from 1952 to 1955, touring Europe with him. He played in the Red Norvo trio in 1955 and toured Australia with them. He was featured in a film short with Charlie Barnet.

Wright's highest profile association was with the Dave Brubeck Quartet, which he joined in 1958. He remained with Brubeck until 1968, as part of the classic line-up with Paul Desmond and Joe Morello, and featured in the quartet's standards "Take Five" and "Blue Rondo à la Turk". He recorded more than 30 albums with the group. Brubeck himself wrote that Wright's steady bass playing "grounded the group", allowing them "to play other tempos and do polyrhythmic things and he wouldn’t budge from this grounded beat".

In 1962, Wright performed in Dave and Iola Brubeck's jazz musical The Real Ambassadors, which featured vocals by Louis Armstrong and Carmen McRae; the work explored, through satire, the role of musicians as cultural ambassadors during the Cold War, and the racism Black jazz musicians often endured. When Wright joined the group, some concert promoters would not allow a Black musician alongside the rest of the White quartet, but Brubeck would refuse to perform without him. In January 1960, Brubeck canceled a 25-date tour of colleges and universities in the American South because 22 of the schools refused to allow Wright to perform onstage in a racially-integrated group.

After leaving Brubeck, Wright led his own ensemble on a tour of Black colleges in 1969 and 1970, then played with Monty Alexander's trio from 1971 to 1974.

He became known as "The Senator" or "Senator Eugene Wright" among jazz musicians. Known for nimble soloing as well as providing rhythmic backing, he worked with many other musicians including Buddy Collette, Vince Guaraldi, Kenny Drew, Gerald Wiggins, Kai Winding, Dottie Dodgion, Jerry Dodgion, Lee Shaw, and Dorothy Donegan.

In his later life, Wright headed the jazz department at the University of Cincinnati and the International Society of Bassists. He was the last surviving member of the classic Dave Brubeck Quartet line-up. He died at an assisted living facility in Los Angeles on December 30, 2020, at the age of 97.

== Discography ==
=== As leader ===
- The Wright Groove (Phillips, 1962)

=== As sideman ===
With Monty Alexander

- Here Comes the Sun (MPS/BASF, 1972)
- We've Only Just Begun (BASF 1972)
- Perception! (MPS/BASF, 1974)

With Gene Ammons

- All Star Sessions (Prestige, 1956)
- Soulful Saxophone (Chess, 1959)
- Jug and Sonny (Chess, 1960)

With Dave Brubeck

- The Dave Brubeck Quartet in Europe (Columbia, 1958)
- Gone with the Wind (Columbia, 1959)
- Time Out (Columbia, 1959)
- The Riddle (Columbia, 1960)
- Brubeck and Rushing (Columbia, 1960)
- Bernstein Plays Brubeck Plays Bernstein (Columbia, 1960)
- Southern Scene (Columbia, 1960)
- Brubeck à la mode (Fantasy, 1960)
- Tonight Only! (Columbia, 1960)
- Near-Myth (Fantasy, 1961)
- Take Five Live (Columbia, 1962)
- Time Further Out (Columbia, 1961)
- The Real Ambassadors (Columbia, 1962)
- Countdown—Time in Outer Space (Columbia, 1962)
- Brandenburg Gate: Revisited (Columbia, 1963)
- Bossa Nova U.S.A. (Columbia, 1962)
- At Carnegie Hall (Columbia, 1963)
- Time Changes (Columbia, 1964)
- Jazz Impressions of Japan (Columbia, 1964)
- Dave Brubeck in Berlin (CBS, 1964)
- Jazz Impressions of New York (Columbia, 1965)
- Angel Eyes (Columbia, 1965)
- Anything Goes! The Dave Brubeck Quartet Plays Cole Porter (Columbia, 1965)
- My Favorite Things (Columbia, 1966)
- Time In (Columbia, 1966)
- Jackpot! (Columbia, 1966)
- Bravo! Brubeck! (Columbia, 1967)
- Buried Treasures (Columbia, 1968)
- The Last Time We Saw Paris (Columbia, 1968)
- Brubeck in Amsterdam (Columbia, 1969)
- Summit Sessions (Columbia, 1971)
- 25th Anniversary Reunion (Horizon, 1977)

With Buddy Collette

- Man of Many Parts (Contemporary, 1956)
- Everybody's Buddy (Challenge, 1958)

With Buddy DeFranco

- The Artistry of Buddy DeFranco (Norgran, 1954)
- Pretty Moods (Norgran, 1954)
- Takes You to the Stars (GNP, 1954)
- In a Mellow Mood (Norgran, 1956)
- Jazz Tones (Norgran, 1956)
- Sweet and Lovely (Verve, 1956)
- Cooking the Blues (Verve, 1958)

With Paul Desmond

- Take Ten (RCA Victor, 1963)
- Bossa Antigua (RCA Victor, 1965)
- Glad To Be Unhappy (RCA Victor, 1965)
- Easy Living (RCA Victor, 1966)

With Kenny Drew

- The Modernity of Kenny Drew (Norgran, 1954)
- The Ideation of Kenny Drew (Norgran, 1954)
- Kenny Drew and His Progressive Piano (Norgran, 1956)

With Sonny Stitt

- Genesis (Prestige, 1975)
- Kaleidoscope (Prestige, 1957)
- Stitt's Bits (Prestige, 1958)

With Cal Tjader

- Tjader Plays Tjazz (Fantasy, 1956)
- Cal Tjader Quartet (Fantasy, 1956)
- The Cal Tjader Quintet Live at Club Macumba San Francisco 1956 (Acrobat Music, 2012)
- Jazz at the Blackhawk (Fantasy 1957)
- Cal Tjader (Fantasy, 1957)
- Mas Ritmo Caliente (Fantasy, 1957)
- Cal Tjader Goes Latin (Fantasy 1959)

With Gerald Wiggins

- The King and I (Challenge, 1957)
- The Loveliness of You (Tampa, 1958)
- Music from Around the World in 80 Days in Modern Jazz (London American, 1958)
