= Miles & Coltrane =

Live album by Miles Davis
- Released: 1988
- Recorded: October 27, 1955; July 3, 1958
- Genre: Jazz
- Length: 46:10
- Label: Columbia
- Producer: George Avakian, Teo Macero

Professional ratings
Review scores
Source	Rating
Allmusic	Allmusic link
Encyclopedia of Popular Music	4/5 stars
The Penguin Guide to Jazz Recordings	3.5/4 stars

Miles & Coltrane is a live album by American jazz musician Miles Davis, released in 1988 by Columbia Records. The music was recorded at two different shows—one on July 4, 1958, at the Newport Jazz Festival, and one from October 27, 1955, in New York. The tracks have been digitally remastered directly from the original analog tapes.

== Track listing ==
1. "Ah-Leu-Cha" (Parker) – 5:49
2. "Straight, No Chaser" (Monk) – 8:48
3. "Fran-Dance" (Davis) – 7:12
4. "Two Bass Hit" (Gillespie, Lewis) – 4:09
5. "Bye Bye Blackbird" (Dixon, Henderson) – 9:16
6. "Little Melonae" (McLean) – 7:20
7. "Budo" (Davis, Powell) – 4:16

== Personnel ==
=== Newport, 1958 (tracks 1–5) ===
- Miles Davis – trumpet
- John Coltrane – tenor saxophone
- Cannonball Adderley – alto saxophone
- Bill Evans – piano
- Paul Chambers – bass
- Jimmy Cobb – drums

=== New York, 1955 (tracks 6, 7) ===
- Miles Davis – trumpet
- John Coltrane – tenor saxophone
- Red Garland – piano
- Paul Chambers – bass
- Philly Joe Jones – drums
- George Avakian – producer
- Michael Berniker – coordinator
- Nathaniel Brewster – research

=== Production ===
- Tim Geelan – mixer
- Amy Herot – coordinator
- Teo Macero – producer
- Jeff Rosen – liner notes
- Allen Weinberg – album cover
