= Pennies from Heaven (song) =

1936 song by Arthur Johnston and Johnny Burke

Single by Bing Crosby and the Georgie Stoll Orchestra
- B-side: "Let's Call a Heart a Heart"
- Published: October 16, 1936, Select Music Publications, Inc., New York
- Released: October 1936
- Recorded: July 24, 1936
- Studio: Recordings Incorporated Studios, 5505 Melrose Avenue, Los Angeles, California
- Genre: Traditional pop
- Length: 3:08
- Label: Decca 947
- Composer: Arthur Johnston
- Lyricist: Johnny Burke

"Pennies from Heaven" is a 1936 American popular song with music by Arthur Johnston and lyrics by Johnny Burke. It was introduced by Bing Crosby with Georgie Stoll and his Orchestra in the 1936 film of the same name.

== Background ==
It was recorded in 1936 by Billie Holiday and afterwards performed by Doris Day, Tony Bennett, Dinah Washington, Clark Terry, Big Joe Turner, Lester Young, Dean Martin, Gene Ammons, Legion of Mary, Guy Mitchell, Harry James and Mandy Patinkin.

The July 24, 1936, recording by Bing Crosby and the Georgie Stoll Orchestra topped the charts for ten weeks in 1936 and was inducted into the Grammy Hall of Fame in 2004. He recorded another version on August 17, accompanied by Louis Armstrong, Frances Langford and the Jimmy Dorsey Orchestra. Crosby recorded the song again for his 1954 album Bing: A Musical Autobiography.

== Other versions ==
On July 21, 1936, at Victor's Hollywood Studio, Eddy Duchin and his Orchestra made the first recording of "Pennies from Heaven." It was released on October 14, 1936, on Victor 25431 and rose to number 2 on the Billboard charts. Jimmy Dorsey also recorded it on August 4, released on Decca 951 in October, and made the chart for one week in December. Then Crosby and Dorsey, along with Armstrong and Frances Langford, made another recording for Decca on August 17, released in October on a 12" Shellac pressing only.

- Billie Holiday's 1936 version with the Teddy Wilson's Orchestra was used in the 1994 film Corrina, Corrina (1994) and appears on the soundtrack.
- Arthur Tracy's 1937 recording of Pennies from Heaven was chosen from hundreds of versions for the 1981 film of that name, with Vernel Bagneris lip-synching to Tracy's voice. The film brought Tracy out of retirement at age 82.
- Count Basie with Jimmy Rushing – The Complete Decca Recordings (1937)
- Louis Armstrong – Louis Armstrong and his All-Stars (1947)
- Dave Brubeck Quartet – Brubeck Time (1954)
- Jimmy Raney with Sonny Clark – Jimmy Raney Quartet (1954)
- Polly Bergen and Gordon MacRae sang a medley which included Pennies from Heaven on her 1958 NBC variety show, The Polly Bergen Show.
- Frank Sinatra recorded two versions, the first one in 1956 with Nelson Riddle for the Songs for Swingin' Lovers! LP and a second one with Count Basie – Sinatra–Basie: An Historic Musical First (1962)
- The Skyliners – The Skyliners (1959) – In the US, this version reached #24 on the Hot 100.
- Louis Prima – The Call of the Wildest (1957)
- Stan Getz with Oscar Peterson – Stan Getz and the Oscar Peterson Trio (1958)
- Marty Robbins – Marty After Midnight (1962)
- Dave Brubeck Quartet with Paul Desmond – At Carnegie Hall (1963)
- Richard 'Groove' Holmes – Get Up & Get It! (1967)
- Regis Philbin – It's Time for Regis! (1968) – also appeared on the soundtrack to the game show Who Wants to Be a Millionaire
- Mandy Patinkin – Mandy Patinkin (1989)
- Marc Secara — You're Everything! (2008)
- Seth MacFarlane performed the song in the film Sing (2016) as Mike, a white mouse who sings in the style of Frank Sinatra.

== See also ==
- List of 1930s jazz standards
