= Time Further Out =

Studio album by The Dave Brubeck Quartet
- Released: November 1961
- Recorded: May & June 1961
- Genres: Cool jazz, West Coast jazz
- Length: 37:02
- Label: Columbia
- Producer: Teo Macero

The Dave Brubeck Quartet chronology
Near-Myth (1961)	Time Further Out (1961)	Brandenburg Gate: Revisited (1961)

Professional ratings
Review scores
Source	Rating
Allmusic	4.5/5 stars
Down Beat (Original Lp release)	2.5/5 stars
The Penguin Guide to Jazz Recordings	3/4 stars

Time Further Out (subtitled Miró Reflections) is a jazz studio album by the Dave Brubeck Quartet released by Columbia Records in November 1961. It features the "classic" lineup of the quartet: pianist and leader Dave Brubeck, alto saxophonist Paul Desmond, bassist Eugene Wright, and drummer Joe Morello. The album was recorded by engineer Fred Plaut and produced by Teo Macero.

== Overview ==
Time Further Out continues the Quartet's exploration of unusual time signatures that began on their 1959 album Time Out. The tracks are ordered by the number of beats per bar: "It's a Raggy Waltz" and "Bluette" are in 3/4; "Charles Matthew Hallelujah", a tribute to Brubeck's newborn son, is in 4/4; "Far More Blue" and "Far More Drums" are in 5/4; "Maori Blues" is in 6/4; "Unsquare Dance" is in 7/4; "Bru's Boogie Woogie" is in 8/8; and "Blue Shadows in the Street" is in 9/8. The time signature of each song is listed on the cover of the album (where they are referred to as "tempos").

=== Cover art ===
Echoing its predecessor Time Out (whose cover featured a painting by S. Neil Fujita), Time Further Out also features a piece of abstract modern art on its cover, this time by the surrealist Catalan artist Joan Miró. The work depicted on the cover is Miró's 1925 painting Calculation. In his liner notes, Brubeck says the album is a "jazz interpretation" of the painting, and was conceived as a "blues suite".

== Track listing ==
All pieces composed by Dave Brubeck.

Side one

1. "It's a Raggy Waltz" (3/4) – 5:12
2. "Bluette" (3/4) – 5:21
3. "Charles Matthew Hallelujah" (4/4) – 2:52
4. "Far More Blue" (5/4) – 4:38

Side two

1. "Far More Drums" (5/4) – 4:00
2. "Maori Blues" (6/4) – 3:54
3. "Unsquare Dance" (7/4) – 2:00
4. "Bru's Boogie Woogie" (8/8) – 2:28
5. "Blue Shadows in the Street" (9/8) – 6:35

== Charts ==
In the United States, the album peaked at #8 on the Billboard 200. On the Billboard Hot 100 singles chart, "Unsquare Dance" peaked at #74.

== Personnel ==
- Dave Brubeck – piano
- Paul Desmond – alto saxophone
- Eugene Wright – double bass
- Joe Morello – drums
