= At Newport =

At Newport or Live at Newport could refer to a number of live albums recorded at the Newport Folk Festival or the Newport Jazz Festival:

- At Newport (Joni Mitchell album), 2023
- At Newport '63, an album by Martial Solal
- At Newport '63 (Joe Williams album), 1963
- At Newport '63 (Lambert, Hendricks & Bavan album), 1963
- At Newport (Cecil Taylor & Gigi Gryce album), 1957
- At Newport 1960, an album by Muddy Waters
- The Coleman Hawkins, Roy Eldridge, Pete Brown, Jo Jones All Stars at Newport, 1957
- Count Basie at Newport, 1957
- Dizzy Gillespie at Newport, 1957
- Duke Ellington and the Buck Clayton All-Stars at Newport, 1956
- Eddie Costa, Mat Mathews & Don Elliott at Newport, 1957
- Ella Fitzgerald and Billie Holiday at Newport, 1958
- Ellington at Newport, a 1956 album by Duke Ellington
- Herbie Mann Live at Newport, a 1963 album by Herbie Mann
- Live at Newport (Christian Scott album), 2008
- Live at Newport (Eddie Harris album), 1970
- Live at Newport, an album by Ian & Sylvia
- Live at Newport (Joan Baez album), 1996
- Live at Newport (John Lee Hooker album)
- Live at Newport (The Kingston Trio album), 1994
- Live at Newport (Lightnin' Hopkins album)
- Live at Newport (McCoy Tyner album)
- Live at Newport (Phil Ochs album), 1996
- Live at Newport, an album by Reverend Gary Davis
- Live at Newport '77, a 1977 album by the Toshiko Akiyoshi – Lew Tabackin Big Band
- Live at Newport II, a 1977 album by the Toshiko Akiyoshi – Lew Tabackin Big Band
- Louis Armstrong and Eddie Condon at Newport, 1956
- Miles & Monk at Newport, a 1964 album by Miles Davis and Thelonious Monk
- New Thing at Newport, a 1965 album by John Coltrane and Archie Shepp
- Nina Simone at Newport, 1960
- The Oscar Peterson Trio with Sonny Stitt, Roy Eldridge and Jo Jones at Newport, 1957
- Red Allen, Kid Ory & Jack Teagarden at Newport, 1957
- The Ruby Braff Octet with Pee Wee Russell & Bobby Henderson at Newport, 1957
- The Teddy Wilson Trio & Gerry Mulligan Quartet with Bob Brookmeyer at Newport, 1957
- Ray Charles at Newport, 1958
- Toshiko and Leon Sash at Newport, a 1957 album by Toshiko Akiyoshi and Leon Sash
- Newport Jazz Festival: Live at Carnegie Hall, a 1973 album by Ella Fitzgerald
- Newport Jazz Festival (1958), an album by Duke Ellington
- Newport '63, a 1993 album by John Coltrane

== See also ==
- Festival (1967 film), a documentary film about the Newport Folk Festival
- Jazz on a Summer's Day, a 1959 documentary film set at the Newport Jazz Festival
