= Howard Brubeck =

American composer and music educator

Howard Rengstorff Brubeck (July 11, 1916 – February 16, 1993) was a composer and music educator and the older brother of jazz pianist Dave Brubeck. His best known work, Dialogues for Jazz Combo and Orchestra, premiered at Carnegie Hall December 10, 1959, with the Dave Brubeck Quartet and Leonard Bernstein conducting the New York Philharmonic and was recorded on Bernstein Plays Brubeck Plays Bernstein in 1961. His California Suite, also from the 1950s, was performed in San Francisco and in Brussels. According to the Grove Dictionary of Music, "The influence of Milhaud – and sometimes echoes of Copland – can be heard in his music; a flair for orchestral writing, secure craftsmanship and sophisticated wit are also in evidence." He wrote liner notes for many of his brother's commercial recordings, and transcribed, edited, and arranged much of his brother's music for publication.

Howard Brubeck was born July 11, 1916, in Concord, California and died February 16, 1993, in La Mesa, California. He earned a Bachelor of Arts in Music from San Francisco State College in 1938 and a Master of Arts in Music from Mills College in 1941, studying with Darius Milhaud, and Domenico Brescia. He taught high school briefly and then became Milhaud's assistant at Mills College. At Mills Brubeck also wrote incidental music for various French plays produced by Milhaud's wife Madeleine. In 1950 Brubeck was appointed composition instructor at San Diego State College. He was hired as chairman of the music department of Palomar Junior College in San Marcos, California in 1953 and promoted to Dean of Humanities in 1966. He retired in 1978. The Brubeck Theater at Palomar College is named in his honor and work there.
