= Take Five =

Jazz standard recorded by the Dave Brubeck Quartet

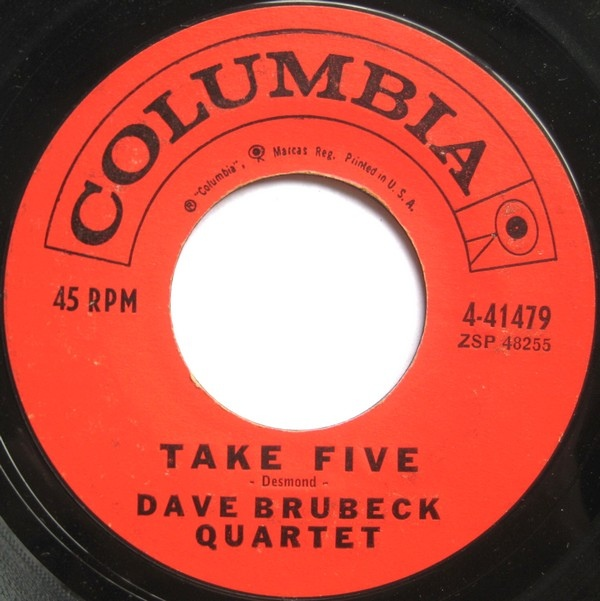

Single by Dave Brubeck Quartet

from the album Time Out
- B-side: "Blue Rondo à la Turk"
- Released: September 21, 1959; May 22, 1961 (reissue)
- Recorded: July 1, 1959
- Studio: CBS 30th Street, New York City
- Genre: Jazz; cool jazz
- Length: 2:55 (single version); 5:28 (album version)
- Label: Columbia 4-41479
- Composer: Paul Desmond
- Producer: Teo Macero

Dave Brubeck Quartet singles chronology
"Jazz Impressions of Eurasia" (1958)	"Take Five" / "Blue Rondo à la Turk" (1959)	"Camptown Races" / "Short'nin' Bread" (1959)

Audio sample
- file; help

"Take Five" is a jazz standard composed by Paul Desmond and originally recorded in 1959 by the Dave Brubeck Quartet for their album Time Out. Written in quintuple time (5/4), the composition is built around a distinctive blues-scale melody in E♭ minor and a recurring two-chord vamp. It became the third track on Time Out, which was released by Columbia Records later that year.

The track emerged after Quartet drummer Joe Morello challenged Desmond to compose a piece in 5/4. Brubeck arranged Desmond’s melodies around Morello’s rhythmic ideas, creating a work in ABA ternary form. Its title refers both to the quintuple meter and the colloquial expression "take five," meaning to take a short break.

Released as a promotional single in September 1959, "Take Five" initially charted modestly but became a sleeper hit in 1961, eventually rising to international popularity. It went on to become the biggest-selling jazz single of all time and remains a staple of radio programming and live performance.

Frequently covered by artists across genres, "Take Five" has been inducted into the Grammy Hall of Fame and is widely regarded as one of the greatest jazz standards ever recorded. In June 2026, CBS News included the song in its list of the 250 essential American songs of the past 250 years.

== Background and recording ==
The Dave Brubeck Quartet's U.S. State Department-sponsored tour of Eurasia in 1958 inspired Brubeck to create an album, Time Out, that experimented with odd time signatures like ones he had encountered abroad. "Take Five" was composed after most of the album's music had been written. The Quartet's drummer, Joe Morello, frequently soloed in 5/4 time and asked Brubeck to compose a new piece to showcase his ability. Brubeck delegated Desmond to write a tune using Morello's rhythm. Desmond composed two melodies, (Note: Desmond's second, bridge melody converts the first five notes of the song "Sunday, Monday, or Always" (a 1943 chart-topper for Bing Crosby) into a rhythmically-altered four-note hook, repeated during a four-bar chord progression that descends diatonically (C♭^{7}-B♭m^{7}-A♭m^{7}-G♭^{7}).) which Brubeck arranged in ternary form.

The Quartet first tried recording "Take Five" on June 25, 1959. It proved so arduous that, after 40 minutes and more than 20 failed attempts, producer Teo Macero suspended the effort because one or another of the members kept losing the beat. This first iteration of the tune used a different rhythmic groove than the final version; it was "driving and fast" with a "lopsided Latin rhythm" while the final version has "a sexy 5/4 Take Five beat" which “sits in the groove”. They successfully recorded the final single and album track in two takes at the next session on July 1. Desmond considered the track a "throwaway". The Quartet first played "Take Five" for a live audience at the Newport Jazz Festival on July 5, 1959.

== Composition ==
"Take Five" is written in the key of E♭ minor, in ternary (ABA) form and in quintuple (5/4) time. According to Alfred Publishing's sheet music published at Musicnotes.com, the song has a moderately fast tempo of 176 beats per minute. The song is known for its distinctive two-chord piano/bass vamp (E♭m-B♭m^{7}), cool jazz saxophone melodies, drum solo, (Note: Featured in the album version but not the single.) and unorthodox meter, from which Dave Brubeck derived its name. Desmond believed the borderline decision to retain his bridge melody was key to the tune gaining popularity.

Rhythmically, the five beats to the bar are split unevenly into 3 + 2 quarter notes; that is, the main accents (and chord changes) are on the first and fourth beats. The album version has ten sections:

Section	Description
Intro	Drum enters, joined by piano after 4 bars and bass after 8 bars to set up 5/4 rhythm with syncopated two-chord (E♭m–B♭m^{7}) vamp
AA	Alto sax plays main melody (A), based on E♭-minor hexatonic blues scale, (Note: With one added note, F♮.) in two similar 4-bar phrases
BB	Alto sax plays bridge melody (B), based on G♭-major scale, in two similar 4-bar phrases
AA	Reprise
Solo 1	Alto sax plays improvised modal solo, based on E♭-minor hexatonic blues scale, (Note: With two extra notes, F♮ and C♮. By contrast, Crist (2019) classifies Desmond's solo as based on the B♭-minor Aeolian scale with one added note, A♮ (the 'blue note' of the E♭-minor hexatonic blues scale).) over vamp (Note: There is an edit in the album track at 2:00 (4 bars after the saxophone solo ends), perhaps to remove a piano solo or to splice the two best solos together.)
Solo 2	Drum fades in playing improvised solo, halfway through which the vamp abruptly crescendoes before fading down to near-silence as solo ends
AA	Reprise, cued by intro vamp played softly before alto sax swiftly rejoins with main melody
BB	Reprise
AA	Reprise
Tag	Alto sax plays repeated 4-note riffs from main melody, ending with final note sustained for 3 bars over vamp

== Release and chart success ==
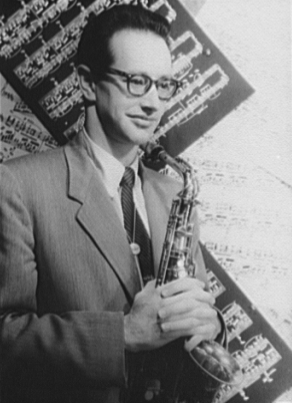
Paul Desmond (1954)

Although released as a promotional single on September 21, 1959, (Note: Almost three months before its parent album Time Out was itself released.) "Take Five" became a sleeper hit in 1961. In May 1961, the track was reissued for radio play and jukebox use, partly in response to its heavy rotation on the radio station WNEW in New York City. That year, it reached No. 25 on the Billboard Hot 100 (October 9), (Note: Its parent album Time Out, likewise reissued in 1961, peaked on November 27 that year at No. 2 on the Billboard Monaural LPs chart (behind only Judy at Carnegie Hall by Judy Garland).) No. 5 on Billboard's Easy Listening chart (October 23) and No. 6 on the UK Record Retailer chart (November 16). In 1962, it peaked at No. 8 both in the New Zealand Lever Hit Parade (January 11) and the Dutch Single Top 100 (February 17). The single is a different recording from the LP version and omits most of the drum solo. It became the first jazz single to surpass a million in sales, reaching two million by the time Brubeck disbanded his 'classic' quartet in December 1967.

Columbia Records quickly enlisted "Take Five" in their doomed launch of the 33 1/3-rpm stereo single in the marketplace. Together with a unique stereo edit of "Blue Rondo à la Turk", they pressed the full album version in small numbers for a promotional six-pack of singles sent to DJs in late 1959.

News of Brubeck's death on December 5, 2012, rekindled the popularity of "Take Five" across Europe, the single debuting in the Austrian Top 40 at No. 73 (December 14) and the French Singles Chart at No. 48 (December 15) while re-entering the Dutch charts at No. 50 (December 15).

Chart performance for "Take Five"
Chart	Peak position
US Billboard Hot 100	25
US Billboard Easy Listening	5
UK Singles (Official Charts)	6
New Zealand (Lever Hit Parade)	8
Australia (Kent Music Report)	7
Netherlands (Single Top 100)	8
Austria (Ö3 Austria Top 40)	73
France (SNEP)	48

== Future within the Quartet ==
Over the next 50 years the group re-recorded it many times, and typically used it to close concerts: each member, upon completing his solo, would leave the stage as in Haydn's Farewell Symphony until only the drummer remained ("Take Five" having been composed to feature Morello's mastery of 5/4 time). Upon his death from lung cancer in 1977, Desmond left the performance royalties for his compositions, including "Take Five", to the American Red Cross, which has since received payments averaging well over $100,000 a year.

== Legacy ==
"Take Five" was positively received both in its release and current times and is the biggest-selling jazz single of all time. In 2020, The New York Times called the standard "among the most iconic records in Jazz". The single was inducted into the Grammy Hall of Fame in 1996. It has received subsequently replay in movie and television soundtracks, giving it continued radio airplay.

"Take Five" was played in a restaurant scene in the 1993 film Manhattan Murder Mystery.

=== Covers and adaptations ===
"Take Five" is considered a jazz standard and has been covered many times in a variety of genres. The first known cover was by Carmen McRae on the 1961 live album Take Five Live, supported by Brubeck, Gene Wright and Morello. For the recording, McRae sang lyrics written by Brubeck's wife Iola; these lyrics would later be used for other vocal recordings.

Desmond wrote and recorded the similar-sounding (and similarly named) composition "Take Ten" for his 1963 solo album Take Ten; he released another rendition of "Take Ten" on his 1973 album Skylark.

Grover Washington Jr. recorded a cover with the subtitle Take Another Five for his 1992 album Next Exit.

Jamaican saxophonist Val Bennett covered the song in 1968 in a roots reggae style, in 4/4 time, and retitled "The Russians Are Coming". Bennett's version became the theme of British television series The Secret Life of Machines in the late 1980s. Al Jarreau recorded an acclaimed scat version of the song for NDR Television in Hamburg, West Germany on October 17, 1975. Moe Koffman recorded a cover for his 1996 album Devil’s Brew. In 2011, a version by Pakistan's Sachal Studios Orchestra won widespread acclaim and charted highly on American and British jazz charts; Brubeck called it "the most interesting" version of Take Five he has heard. Canadian animator Steven Woloshen created the 2003 animated short film Cameras Take Five, which animated an improvised series of abstract lines and figures set to the song.

== Track listing ==
Take Five / Blue Rondo à la Turk (1959)
No.	Title	Length
1.	"Take Five"	2:50
2.	"Blue Rondo à la Turk"	2:59

== Personnel ==
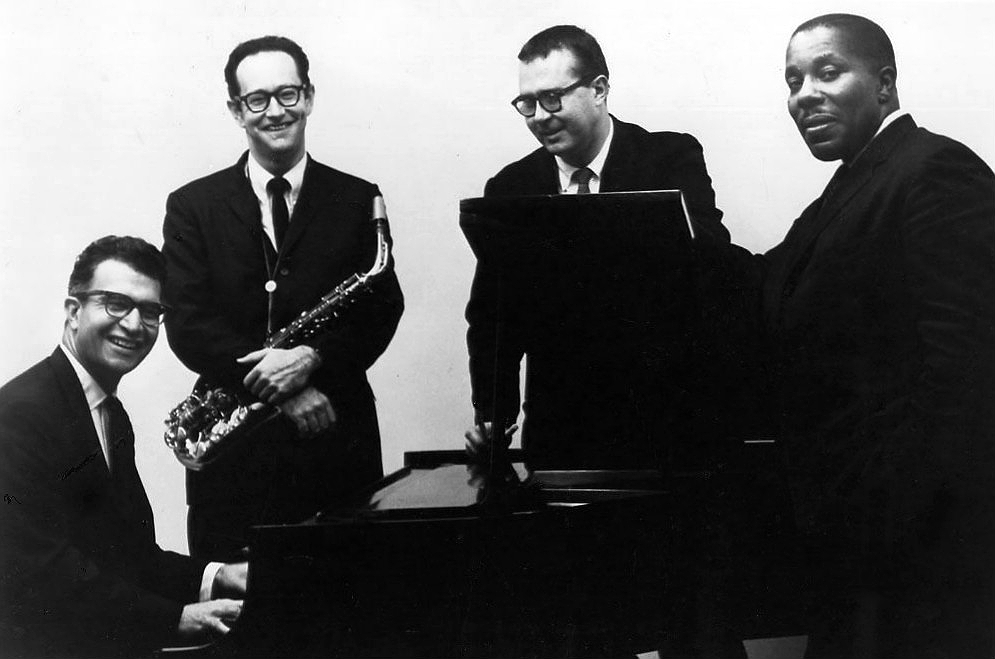
Dave Brubeck Quartet (1962)

- Dave Brubeck – piano
- Paul Desmond – alto saxophone
- Gene Wright – upright bass
- Joe Morello – drums
