= Blue Rondo à la Turk =

Instrumental by Dave Brubeck Quartet

from the album Time Out
- Recorded: 1959
- Genre: Cool jazz
- Length: 6:44
- Label: Columbia
- Composer: Dave Brubeck

"Blue Rondo à la Turk" is a jazz composition by Dave Brubeck. It first appeared on the Dave Brubeck Quartet's album Time Out in 1959, featuring Brubeck on piano, Paul Desmond on alto saxophone, Eugene Wright on double bass, and Joe Morello on drums. It is written in two distinct sections: one in 9/8 time inspired by Turkish aksak rhythms, and one in a conventional swung 4/4. The composition has become a jazz standard.

== History ==
Rhythm of "Blue Rondo à la Turk": the arrows on the tempo dial show the tempo for ♪, ♩, ♩. and the measure beat. Starts slow, and speeds up to approximate the tempo of "Blue Rondo à la Turk".

Brubeck first heard what would become the composition's unconventional rhythm being performed by street musicians in Turkey. Upon asking the musicians where they got the rhythm, one replied: "This rhythm is to us what the blues is to you."

Contrary to popular belief, the piece is not musicially related to the last movement of Wolfgang Amadeus Mozart's "Rondo Alla Turca", the last movement of Piano Sonata No. 11. However, both songs are based on Turkish street musicians; Mozart's having been based on Turkish Janissary bands.

The first section of "Blue Rondo à la Turk" uses a repeating four-bar pattern of additive rhythms that consists of three measures of 2+2+2+3 followed by one measure of 3+3+3:

== Derivative pieces ==
English progressive rock keyboardist Keith Emerson adapted this piece into "Rondo" by the Nice; it appeared on their 1968 album The Thoughts of Emerlist Davjack. Emerson's version was in 4/4 time; Brubeck described it to him as "your 4/4 version which I can't play." Later, Emerson folded the melody into the 14-minute "Finale (Medley)" on the 1993 Emerson, Lake & Palmer live album Live at the Royal Albert Hall, as well as improvisations on the band's rendition of Aaron Copland's "Fanfare for the Common Man". He frequently used "Rondo" as a closing number during performances both with the Nice and Emerson, Lake & Palmer.

On his 1981 album Breakin' Away, American jazz singer Al Jarreau performed a vocal version of the song, with lyrics by himself.

== In popular culture ==
The track is used in the soundtracks of the 2005 comedy film Wedding Crashers, the 2003 Swedish documentary Närvarande, and an Emmy-award winning 2019 episode of The Simpsons entitled "Mad About the Toy".
