= Joe Morello =

American jazz drummer (1928–2011)

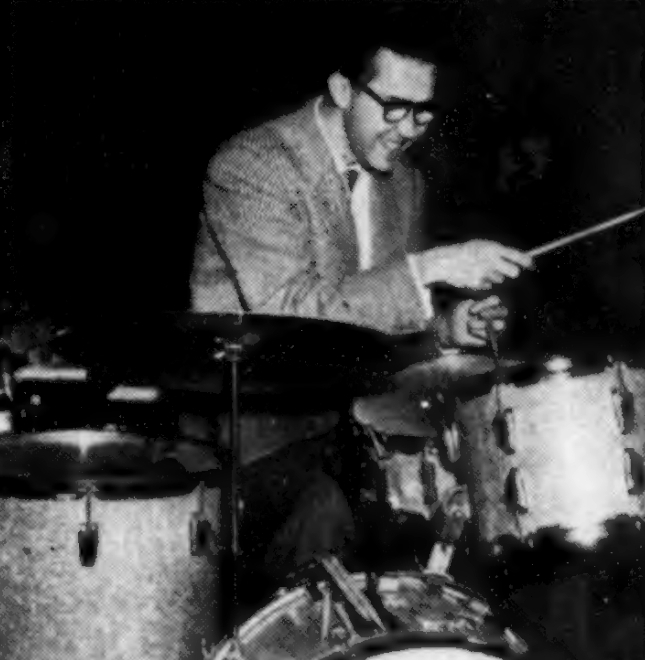
- Morello in a 1960 advertisement

Background information
- Born: Joseph Albert Morello; July 17, 1928; Springfield, Massachusetts, U.S.
- Died: March 12, 2011 (aged 82) Irvington, New Jersey, U.S.
- Genres: Jazz; cool jazz; third stream
- Occupation: Musician
- Instrument: Drums
- Years active: 1954–2011
- Label: Columbia
- Formerly of: The Dave Brubeck Quartet

Joseph Albert Morello (July 17, 1928 – March 12, 2011) was an American jazz drummer best known for serving as the drummer for pianist Dave Brubeck, as part of the Dave Brubeck Quartet, from 1957 to 1972, including during the quartet's "classic lineup" from 1958 to 1968, which also included alto saxophonist Paul Desmond and bassist Eugene Wright. Morello's facility for playing unusual time signatures and rhythms enabled that group to record a series of albums that explored them. The most notable of these was the first in the series, the 1959 album Time Out, which contained the hit songs "Take Five" and "Blue Rondo à la Turk". In fact, "Take Five", the album's biggest hit (and the first jazz single to sell more than one million copies) was specifically written by Desmond as a way to showcase Morello's ability to play in 5/4 time.

Besides playing with Brubeck, Morello also served as an accompanist for other musicians, including Marian McPartland, Tal Farlow and Gary Burton, and recorded his own albums as well. He received numerous accolades during his life, including being named the best drummer by Down Beat magazine five years in a row.

== Biography ==
Joe Morello was born in Springfield, Massachusetts, United States to Joseph Morello and Lillian LaPalme. His father was a French emigrant from Nice of Italian ancestry and his mother hailed from French Canada. Morello suffered from partial vision from birth, and devoted himself to indoor activities. At six years old, he began studying the violin. Three years later, he was a featured soloist with the Boston Symphony Orchestra, playing Mendelssohn's Violin Concerto, and again three years later.

At the age of 15, Morello met the violinist Jascha Heifetz and decided that he would never be able to equal Heifetz's "sound". Therefore, he switched to drumming, first studying with a show drummer named Joe Sefcik and then George Lawrence Stone, author of the noted drum textbook Stick Control for the Snare Drummer. Stone was so impressed with Morello's ideas that he incorporated them into his next book, Accents & Rebounds, which is dedicated to Morello. Later, Morello studied with Radio City Music Hall percussionist, Billy Gladstone.

After moving to New York City, Morello worked with numerous notable jazz musicians including Johnny Smith, Tal Farlow, Stan Kenton, Phil Woods, Sal Salvador, Marian McPartland, Jay McShann, Art Pepper, and Howard McGhee. After a period of playing in McPartland's trio, Morello declined invitations to join both Benny Goodman and Tommy Dorsey's bands, favoring a temporary two-month tour with the Dave Brubeck Quartet in 1955. Morello remained with Brubeck for well over a decade, departing in 1967. Morello later became an in-demand clinician, teacher and bandleader, whose former students include Danny Gottlieb, TigerBill Meligari, Bruce Springsteen E Street Band drummer Max Weinberg, Rich Galichon, Phish drummer Jon Fishman, Gary Feldman, Patrick Wante, Tony Woo, Frankie Valli and the Four Seasons drummer Gerry Polci, Jerry Granelli, RIOT drummer Sandy Slavin, retired Army Blues drummer Steve Fidyk, Glenn Johnson, Pittsburgh drummer Bennett Carlise, Level System author and professional drummer Jeff W. Johnson, Jazz drummer John B. Riley, and Bon Jovi drummer Tico Torres.

Morello appeared in many Brubeck performances and contributed to over 60 albums with Brubeck. On "Take Five", he plays an imaginative drum solo maintaining the 5/4 time signature throughout. Another example of soloing in odd time signatures can be heard on "Unsquare Dance", in which he solos using only sticks without drums in 7/4 time. At the end of the track, he can be heard laughing about the "trick" ending. He also features on "Blue Rondo à la Turk", "Strange Meadow Lark", "Pick-Up Sticks" and "Castilian Drums".

During his career, Morello appeared on over 120 albums. He authored several drum books, including Master Studies, published by Modern Drummer Publications, and also made instructional videos. Morello was the recipient of many awards, including Playboy magazine's best drummer award for seven years in a row, and Down Beat magazine's best drummer award five years in a row. He was elected to the Modern Drummer magazine Hall of Fame in 1988, the Percussive Arts Society Hall of Fame in 1993, and was the recipient of Hudson Music's first TIP (Teacher Integration Program) Lifetime Achievement award in June, 2010.

Morello had poor eyesight from birth and became blind in 1976. Due to his visual impairment, he spent most of his later years teaching rather than primarily performing with bands. However, Morello participated in reunions with Dave Brubeck and the Marian McPartland Trio in his later life.

Morello died at his home in Irvington, New Jersey, on March 12, 2011, aged 82, and is interred at Saint Michael's Cemetery, Springfield, Massachusetts.

Upon his death, Morello's wife Jean gave control of Joe Morello's memorabilia and collections to Marvin Burock, one of Joe's students, who had toured extensively with Morello and who was tasked with transcribing Morello's Modern Drummer articles for ten years.

== Discography ==
=== As leader/co-leader ===
- Collections (Intro, 1957) with Red Norvo, Art Pepper and Gerry Wiggins
- Joe Morello (RCA Bluebird, 1961-62) (Issued in 1989 - Partially reissues It's About Time)
- It's About Time (RCA, 1962)
- Another Step Forward (Ovation, 1969)
- Percussive Jazz (Ovation, 1977)
- Going Places (DMP, 1993)
- Morello Standard Time (DMP, 1994)

=== As sideman ===
With Dave Brubeck

- 1957 Jazz Impressions of the U.S.A.
- 1957 Dave Digs Disney
- 1957 Reunion
- 1958 Jazz Goes to Junior College
- 1958 Jazz Impressions of Eurasia
- 1958 Newport 1958
- 1958 The Dave Brubeck Quartet in Europe
- 1959 Gone with the Wind
- 1959 The Riddle
- 1959 Time Out
- 1960 Brubeck and Rushing
- 1960 Brubeck à la mode
- 1961 Take Five Live
- 1961 Time Further Out
- 1961 Tonight Only!
- 1962 Countdown—Time in Outer Space
- 1962 Music from West Side Story
- 1962 The Real Ambassadors
- 1963 Bossa Nova U.S.A.
- 1963 Brandenburg Gate: Revisited
- 1963 Dave Brubeck Quartet in Amsterdam
- 1961 Near-Myth
- 1963 At Carnegie Hall
- 1964 Dave Brubeck in Berlin
- 1964 Jazz Impressions of Japan
- 1964 Time Changes
- 1965 Angel Eyes
- 1965 Jazz Impressions of New York
- 1965 The Canadian Concert of Dave Brubeck
- 1966 My Favorite Things
- 1966 Time In
- 1966 Anything Goes: The Music of Cole Porter
- 1967 Bravo! Brubeck!
- 1967 Right Now!
- 1967 The Last Time We Saw Paris
- 1968 Jackpot!
- 1971 Summit Sessions
- 1972 Adventures in Time
- 1973 On Campus
- 1976 25th Anniversary Reunion
- 1988 The Great Concerts: Amsterdam Copenhagen Carnegie Hall
- 1991 Live (1956–1957)
- 1992 Live (1954 and 1959)
- 1993 Someday My Prince Will Come
- 1993 St. Louis Blues

With Gary Burton

- 1961 New Vibe Man in Town
- 1962 Who Is Gary Burton?

With Tal Farlow

- 1954 Tal Farlow Quartet
- 1955 The Tal Farlow Album

With Marian McPartland

- 1952 Lullaby of Birdland
- 1955 Marian McPartland in Concert
- 1955 Live At the Hickory House
- 1956 After Dark
- 1957 The Marian McPartland Trio
- 2002 Live at Shanghai Jazz
- 2003 All My Life

With Gil Mellé

- Gil Mellé Quintet/Sextet (Blue Note, 1953)
- Gil Mellé Quintet with Urbie Green and Tal Farlow (Blue Note, 1953)

With Sal Salvador

- 1956 Shades of Sal Salvador
- Juicy Lucy (Bee Hive, 1978)

With Chuck Wayne

- The Jazz Guitarist (Savoy, 1953 [1956])

With others

- 1954 Jimmy Raney Quintet, Jimmy Raney
- 1956 The Middle Road, Jimmy McPartland
- 1957 Dream of You, Helen Merrill
- 1957 Mr. Roberts Plays Guitar, Howard Roberts
- 1958 Sweet Paul Vol. 1 Paul Desmond
- 1961 Jazz Winds from a New Direction, Hank Garland
- 1977 Early Art, Art Pepper
- 1979 The Big Apple Bash, Jay McShann
- 1994 Burning for Buddy: A Tribute to the Music of Buddy Rich, Buddy Rich Big Band
- 1994 The Gamut, Robert Hohner
- 1995 Two Facets of Louis: 1920-1950, Louis Armstrong
- 1997 Burning for Buddy: A Tribute to the Music of Buddy Rich Vol. 2, Buddy Rich Big Band
- 2000 Chega de Saudade, Stan Getz
- 2007 Sings the Ultimate American Songbook Vol. 1, Tony Bennett

== Videography ==
- Joe Morello – Drum Method 1: The Natural approach to Technique (DVD) Hot Licks 2006
- Joe Morello – Drum Method 2: Around the Kit (DVD) Hot Licks 2006
- Joe Morello, Danny Gottlieb: Natural Drumming Lessons 1&2 (DVD) Mel Bay Publications, Inc. 2005
- Joe Morello, Danny Gottlieb: Natural Drumming Lessons 3&4 (DVD) Mel Bay Publications, Inc. 2006
- Joe Morello, Danny Gottlieb: Natural Drumming Lessons 5&6 (DVD) Mel Bay Publications, Inc. 2006
- The Art of Playing with Brushes (DVD) Hudson Music LLC 2007

== Bibliography ==
- New Directions in Rhythm: Studies in 3/4 and 5/4 Time 1963
- Off the Record: A Collection of Famous Drum Solos 1966
- Rudimental Jazz: A Modern Application of Rudiments to the Drum Outfit 1967
- Master Studies: Exercises for the Development of Control and Technique Modern Drummer Publications, Inc. 1983
- Master Studies II: More Exercises for the Development of Control and Technique Modern Drummer Publications, Inc. 2006
- Rudimental Jazz: A Musical Application of Rudiments to the Drumset including CD, Modern Drummer Publications, Classics Series 2010
