= Snow White (2025 soundtrack) =

Disney's Snow White (Original Motion Picture Soundtrack)

Soundtrack album by various artists
- Released: March 14, 2025 (standard); March 20, 2025 (deluxe)
- Recorded: 2022
- Studio: AIR, London
- Genre: Film soundtrack; musical theatre
- Length: 33:01
- Label: Walt Disney
- Producer: Benj Pasek; Justin Paul; Ian Eisendrath; Dave Metzger

Pasek and Paul chronology
Spirited (2022)	Disney's Snow White (2025)

Singles from Disney's Snow White
- 1. "Waiting on a Wish" Released: March 4, 2025

Disney's Snow White (Original Motion Picture Soundtrack) is the soundtrack album to the 2025 film Snow White featuring songs written by the songwriting duo Benj Pasek and Justin Paul, who also produced the album with Ian Eisendrath and David Metzger, the orchestrator of the songs. The film, directed by Marc Webb for Walt Disney Pictures, is a live-action reimagining of Walt Disney's Snow White and the Seven Dwarfs, which was based on the 1812 fairy tale "Snow White" by the Brothers Grimm, the film stars Rachel Zegler as the eponymous title character, alongside Gal Gadot and Andrew Burnap.

The soundtrack was released through Walt Disney Records on March 14, 2025, a week prior to the film's release. It featured 15 songs, four of them were taken from the soundtrack of the original film composed by Frank Churchill and Larry Morey. A deluxe edition of the album was released on March 20, featuring instrumental versions of the songs and the underscore composed by Jeff Morrow.

== Background ==
In May 2019, it was reported that songwriters Benj Pasek and Justin Paul would write new songs for the film, having previously written lyrics for two new songs in Disney's 2019 remake of Aladdin. Jack Feldman joined as an additional lyricist, writing new songs in their collaboration. Together, they wrote five original songs for the film, including a new "I Want" song for Snow White, titled "Waiting on a Wish", teased first in the film's trailer in December, 2024. They also wrote a new "villain song" for the Evil Queen titled "All Is Fair", a new love duet for Snow White and Jonathan titled "A Hand Meets a Hand", which was co-written with Lizzy McAlpine, another duet with the characters, "Princess Problems", and a new opening ensemble number titled "Good Things Grow". The film features four of the eight songs from the original film by Frank Churchill and Larry Morey: "Heigh-Ho", "Whistle While You Work", "The Silly Song" and "Someday My Prince Will Come"; the final of which is heard only instrumentally in the underscore due to the plot changes.

In January 2025, it was revealed that Jeff Morrow had composed the score. Dave Metzger, a frequent collaborator on the music for films made by Walt Disney Animation Studios, served as orchestrator for the songs. Christophe Beck, who also worked on several Disney projects (both animated and live-action), and for whom Morrow served as a protégé, served as score consultant.

== Release ==
On March 4, 2025, the song "Waiting on a Wish" which was teased during the promotional blitzkrieg, released as the lead single from the album. Zegler performed the song live at a promotional tour in Japan, where she also joined with Sakura Kiryu, who voiced for the title character in the Japanese version of the animated film. An unplugged acoustic version, performed by Zegler, was uploaded to YouTube, the same day. The soundtrack was released through Walt Disney Records on March 14, featuring the original songs written by Pasek and Paul, along with the songs from the animated film. A deluxe edition of the album was released on March 20, 2025, featuring instrumental versions of the songs and Morrow's underscore. Morrow's score was separately released on March 21.

== Track listing ==
All tracks are written and produced by Benj Pasek and Justin Paul, except where noted. Ian Eisendrath and David Metzger co-produced the tracks with Pasek and Paul.

Disney's Snow White (Original Motion Picture Soundtrack) – standard edition
No.	Title	Writer(s)	Artist(s)	Length
1.	"Good Things Grow"	Benj Pasek; Justin Paul; Jack Feldman	Hadley Fraser; Krystina Alabado; Dean Boodaghians-Nolan; Jonathan Bourne; Felipe Bejarano; Emilia Faucher; Ensemble	3:42
2.	"Good Things Grow (Villagers’ Reprise)"	Pasek; Paul; Feldman	Vivienne Rowe; Kieron Bell; Freya Rose Mitchell; Leo Cropley; Faucher; Rachel Zegler	0:45
3.	"Waiting on a Wish"	Pasek; Paul; Feldman	Zegler	4:52
4.	"Heigh-Ho"	Frank Churchill; Larry Morey	Jeremy Swift; George Salazar; Jason Kravits; Tituss Burgess; Martin Klebba; Andy Grotelueschen	3:45
5.	"All Is Fair"	Pasek; Paul; Feldman	Gal Gadot; Ensemble	3:32
6.	"Whistle While You Work"	Churchill; Morey	Zegler; Kravits; Salazar; Morrow; Grotelueschen; Burgess; Klebba; Swift	3:02
7.	"Princess Problems"	Pasek; Paul	Andrew Burnap; Zegler	2:18
8.	"The Silly Song"	Churchill; Morey	Kravits; Fletcher Sheridan; Swift; Grotelueschen; Dujonna Gift; Jimmy Johnston; Salazar; Ensemble	1:08
9.	"A Hand Meets a Hand"	Pasek; Paul; Lizzy McAlpine	Zegler; Burnap	4:08
10.	"All Is Fair (Reprise)"	Pasek; Paul; Feldman	Gadot	1:48
11.	"Waiting on a Wish (Reprise)"	Pasek; Paul; Feldman	Zegler	1:20
12.	"Snow White Returns"	Pasek; Paul	Zegler; Ensemble	1:22
13.	"Good Things Grow (Finale)"	Pasek; Paul; Feldman	Zegler; Burnap; Ensemble	1:13
Total length:				33:01

Disney's Snow White (Original Motion Picture Soundtrack) – deluxe edition
No.	Title	Writer(s)	Length
14.	"I Remember"	Jeff Morrow	3:35
15.	"Mirror Mirror"	Morrow	2:01
16.	"Once Upon a Time"	Morrow	0:59
17.	"The Queen's Table"	Morrow	1:03
18.	"The Orchard"	Morrow	2:23
19.	"Animal Friends"	Morrow	3:40
20.	"Don't Be Afraid"	Morrow	1:43
21.	"The Fairest Lives"	Morrow	0:55
22.	"Food Fight"	Morrow	0:58
23.	"Whistling Lesson"	Morrow	0:47
24.	"Unfair Fight"	Morrow	2:41
25.	"Faith in Each Other"	Morrow	0:39
26.	"Jonathan Captured"	Morrow	1:43
27.	"Fearless, Fair, Brave, True"	Morrow	0:40
28.	"The Apple"	Morrow	4:56
29.	"Requiem"	Morrow	2:43
30.	"The Dungeon"	Morrow	2:30
31.	"True Love's Kiss"	Morrow	1:28
32.	"We're Not Afraid"	Morrow	1:44
33.	"Time to Restore Our Kingdom"	Morrow	3:14
34.	"Waiting on a Wish (Main on Ends Version)"	Morrow	1:05
35.	"Good Things Grow (Instrumental)"	Pasek; Paul; Feldman	3:42
36.	"Good Things Grow (Villagers’ Reprise) (Instrumental)"	Pasek; Paul; Feldman	0:45
37.	"Waiting on a Wish (Instrumental)"	Pasek; Paul; Feldman	4:52
38.	"Heigh-Ho (Instrumental)"	Churchill; Morey	3:45
39.	"All Is Fair (Instrumental)"	Pasek; Paul; Feldman	3:32
40.	"Whistle While You Work (Instrumental)"	Churchill; Morey	3:02
41.	"Princess Problems (Instrumental)"	Pasek; Paul	2:18
42.	"The Silly Song (Instrumental)"	Churchill; Morey	1:08
43.	"A Hand Meets a Hand (Instrumental)"	Pasek; Paul; McAlpine	4:08
44.	"All Is Fair (Reprise) (Instrumental)"	Pasek; Paul; Feldman	1:48
45.	"Waiting on a Wish (Reprise) (Instrumental)"	Pasek; Paul; Feldman	1:20
46.	"Snow White Returns (Instrumental)"	Pasek; Paul	1:22
47.	"Good Things Grow (Finale) (Instrumental)"	Pasek; Paul; Feldman	1:13
Total length:			1:47:00

Notes

- The score (tracks 14–34) was also released as a separate album, Snow White (Original Score)

== Critical reception ==
Jonathan Broxton noted "In the end, if you are going to get anything out of this new version of Snow White, it is going to be necessary for you to let go of any preconceptions you have of what Snow White music should sound like, and approach this as essentially a brand new take on the story [...] Taken at face value Pasek & Paul’s songs are good, with “Waiting on a Wish” clearly the standout. Similarly, Jeff Morrow’s score is competent and appropriate, well-structured, and well-orchestrated, and although it is perhaps a little on the anonymous side it nevertheless provides exactly what this film needs, and there are some really excellent highlights." Negatively, Filmtracks based critic wrote "The legacy of the 1937 classic deserved far better than this, especially in the recognition for its music. Reinventing the soundtrack only yields neutral shrugs and insults in the lack of respect shown. Even as a standalone musical, the songs and score in Snow White never achieve synchrony, leaving the whole endeavor as a head-scratcher. None of this remake music was necessary or welcome."

Dani Kessel Odom of Screen Rant complimented the songs as the film's best aspect, praising the lead actors' vocals (especially Zegler's) Pasek and Paul's work "creating songs that fit with the existing music while establishing their own tone"; Odom added that the soundtrack was reminiscent of the works of Alan Menken and Howard Ashman during the Disney Renaissance, with their music "combines the classic Disney sound with the Broadway pop flare for which Pasek & Paul are known". However, writing for the same website, Kieran Hair was critical of the visual accompaniment of the said songs, calling it "boring".

Alison Wilmore of Vulture noted their work "as smooth and unremarkable as river rocks", while Richard Lawson of Vanity Fair described it as "generic “I want” solos and big group numbers" that are mostly repurposed from their soundtrack to The Greatest Showman. Pete Hammond of Deadline Hollywood complimented Pasek and Paul's tunes being "lively and lilting".

== Commercial performance ==
The film's soundtrack reached No. 11 on the Billboard Kid Albums chart and No. 19 on the Billboard Soundtracks chart. The song "Waiting on a Wish" by Rachel Zegler reached No. 74 on the UK Official Singles Sales chart.

Chart performance for Disney's Snow White (Original Motion Picture Soundtrack)
Chart (2025)	Peak position
UK Album Downloads (OCC)	32
UK Compilation Albums (OCC)	29
UK Soundtrack Albums (OCC)	18
US Kid Albums (Billboard)	11
US Top Soundtracks (Billboard)	19

== Release history ==
Release history and formats for Disney's Snow White (Original Motion Picture Soundtrack)
Region	Date	Format(s)	Label(s)	Ref.
Various	March 14, 2025 (standard); March 20, 2025 (deluxe)	Digital download; streaming	Walt Disney Records	
Various	May 9, 2025	LP	Walt Disney Records	
