= Snow White and the Seven Dwarfs (soundtrack) =

- The cover for the original 1938 release by Victor Records.

Soundtrack album by various artists
- Released: January 1938
- Recorded: 1937
- Genres: Soundtrack; traditional pop; musical theater
- Label: Victor

Professional ratings
Review scores
Source	Rating
Music Week	3/5 stars

Snow White and the Seven Dwarfs is the soundtrack from the 1937 Walt Disney film, notable as the first commercially issued soundtrack album. The recording has been expanded and reissued numerous times following its original release in January 1938 as Songs from Walt Disney's Snow White and the Seven Dwarfs (with the Same Characters and Sound Effects as in the Film of That Title).

== Songs ==
All lyrics are written by Larry Morey; all music is composed by Frank Churchill.

No.	Title	Performer(s)	Length
1.	"I'm Wishing"	Adriana Caselotti
2.	"One Song"	Harry Stockwell
3.	"With a Smile and a Song"	Adriana Caselotti
4.	"Whistle While You Work"	Adriana Caselotti
5.	"Heigh-Ho"	The Dwarfs Chorus (Roy Atwell, Pinto Colvig, Billy Gilbert, Otis Harlan & Scotty Mattraw)
6.	"Bluddle-Uddle-Um-Dum (The Dwarfs' Washing Song)"	The Dwarfs Chorus
7.	"The Silly Song (The Dwarfs' Yodel Song)"	The Dwarfs Chorus
8.	"Someday My Prince Will Come"	Adriana Caselotti
9.	"Heigh-Ho" (Reprise)	The Dwarfs Chorus
10.	"One Song" (Reprise)	Harry Stockwell
11.	"Someday My Prince Will Come" (Reprise)	Chorus

=== Songs not used in the film ===
Songs written for the film but not used include two songs for the Dwarfs:

- "Music in Your Soup" (the accompanying sequence was completely animated, though not inked and painted, before being deleted from the film)
- "You're Never Too Old to Be Young" (replaced by "The Silly Song")

== Releases ==
=== Original release ===
The soundtrack was first issued as a collection (Victor J-8) of three 78 rpm singles. Each of the singles became a Top 10 hit simultaneously in February 1938.

==== Track listing ====
- Side 1: "With a Smile and a Song" b/w Side 2: "Dig-a-Dig Dig / Heigh Ho" (Victor 25735)
- Side 3: "I'm Wishing / One Song" b/w Side 4: "Whistle While You Work" (Victor 25736)
- Side 5: "Dwarfs' Yodel Song" b/w Side 6: "Some Day My Prince Will Come" (Victor 25737)

=== Other releases ===
==== 1980s releases ====
1980 - Original Motion Picture Soundtrack Picture Disc LP

Disneyland Records 3101

Side One

1. Overture

I'm Wishing—Snow White

One Song—Prince

2. With a Smile and a Song—Snow White

3. Whistle While You Work—Snow White

4. Heigh Ho—Dwarfs

Side Two

1. Bluddle-Uddle-Um-Dum—Dwarfs

2. A Silly Song—Dwarfs

3. Some Day My Prince Will Come—Snow White

4. Finale

The first ever Snow White compact disc was officially released by Disney in 1987. The recording (first issued on LP record in 1980) was a combination of the film's soundtrack intertwined with the story narrated by Hal Smith.

The first CD to contain just the soundtrack (without additional narration) was a 1988 disc issued by BMG (RCA). It included the same recordings found on the original Victor 1938 shellac records but with the previously deleted lyrics from the "Dwarfs' Yodel Song".

==== 1993 reissue ====
On June 8, 1993, about three weeks before the final North American theatrical release of the film, a digitally remastered soundtrack appeared in stores. In addition to the normal songs and musical orchestration, the album also included the two deleted numbers: "Music In Your Soup" and "You're Never Too Old to Be Young". In the liner notes, dated January 1993, album producers Randy Thornton and Michael Leon shared how the digital restoration was pieced together from seven different original sources. Also included are the lyrics for each song as well as a chart showing what each of the four composers/songwriters (Frank Churchill, Larry Morey, Leigh Harline, and Paul J. Smith) contributed to the final soundtrack.

The 1993 CD was also sold in the Soundtrack Collector's Series. A separate cassette tape was available, too.

==== 1997 reissue ====
In 1997, the album was released as part of the Classic Soundtrack Series. The CD came shrink-wrapped with a round sticker placed on the outside that read, "Digitally Remastered—Includes lyrics and artwork". The insert booklet contained different artwork from the 1993 version but the same song lyrics. The liner notes, dated December 15, 1997, were nearly identical except for an update from producer Randy Thornton: He revealed that seven seconds of music had been omitted from the 1993 edition of "Love's First Kiss (Finale)" and were now included in this new disc.

==== 2001 digital remaster ====
On September 25, 2001, shortly before the film premiered on DVD, the digitally remastered CD was again released in the United States. Like in the previous CDs, the lyrics for each song were included with the insert booklet and there were identical liner notes, but the artwork was changed.

=== 2006 digital remaster and current release ===
On August 28, 2006, Walt Disney Records released what is now the current soundtrack for the classic film. Some tweaks to song titles and timings have since occurred in the digital releases.

==== 2006 Track Listing ====
1. "Overture"
2. "Magic Mirror"
3. "I'm Wishing/One Song"
4. "Queen Theme"
5. "Far into the Forest"
6. "Animal Friends/ With a Smile and a Song"
7. "Just Like a Doll's House"
8. "Whistle While You Work"
9. "Heigh-Ho"
10. "Let's See What's Upstairs"
11. "There's Trouble a-Brewin'"
12. "It's a Girl"
13. "Hooray! She Stays"
14. "Bluddle-Uddle-Um-Dum (The Dwarfs' Washing Song)"
15. "I've Been Tricked"
16. "The Dwarfs' Yodel Song (The Silly Song)"
17. "Some Day My Prince Will Come"
18. "Pleasant Dreams"
19. "A Special Sort of Death"
20. "Why Grumpy, You Do Care"
21. "Makin' Pies"
22. "Have a Bite"
23. "Chorale for Snow White"
24. "Love's First Kiss (Finale)"
25. "Music in Your Soup"
26. "You're Never Too Old to Be Young"

Total Time: 73:57

==== Current (2023) Track listing ====
External audio
- You may hear "Whistle While You Work" performed by Adriana Caselotti in 1937; Here on ucsb.edu
- You may hear "I'm Wishing / One Song" performed by Adriana Caselotti and Harry Stockwell in 1937; Here on ucsb.edu
- You may hear "With A Smile and A Song" performed by Adriana Caselotti in 1937; Here on ucsb.edu

1. "Overture - Snow White"
2. "Magic Mirror"
3. "I'm Wishing / One Song"
4. "Queen Theme"
5. "Far Into the Forest"
6. "Animal Friends / With a Smile and a Song"
7. "Just Like a Doll's House"
8. "Whistle While You Work"
9. "Heigh-Ho"
10. "Let's See What's Upstairs"
11. "There's Trouble a-Brewin'"
12. "It's a Girl"
13. "Hooray! She Stays"
14. "Bluddle-Uddle-Um-Dum (The Dwarf's Washing Song)"
15. "I've Been Tricked"
16. "The Silly Song (The Dwarfs' Yodel Song)"
17. "Some Day My Prince Will Come"
18. "Pleasant Dreams"
19. "A Special Sort of Death"
20. "Why Grumpy, You Do Care"
21. "Makin' Pies"
22. "Have a Bite"
23. "Chorale for Snow White"
24. "Love's First Kiss (Finale)"
25. "Music in Your Soup"
26. "You're Never Too Old To Be Young"

== See also ==
- List of Disney film soundtracks
