= Disney Sing-Along Songs =

Series of compilations of Disney songs with on-screen lyrics

- The original 1986 Disney Sing Along Songs title card.
- Based on: Music from various works by The Walt Disney Company
- Starring: Corey Burton; Eddie Carroll
- Music by: Various composers
- Production company: Walt Disney Home Video/Entertainment
- Distributed by: Buena Vista Home Video/Entertainment
- Running time: Varies
- Country: United States
- Language: English (primarily)

Disney Sing-Along Songs (Note: Also known as Canta con Nosotros in Latin America and Spain, Disney Chantons Ensemble in France, Coleção Cante com Disney in Brazil, Disneys Sing mit uns in Germany, Disney Canta con Noi in Italy and Sing Along Song: Disney Musical World in Japan.) is a series of videos on VHS, Betamax, LaserDisc, and DVD with musical moments from various Disney films, TV shows, and attractions. Lyrics for the songs are sometimes displayed on-screen with the Mickey Mouse icon as a "bouncing ball". Early releases open with a theme song introduction (written by Patrick DeRemer) containing footage featuring Professor Owl and his class, seen originally in 1953 in two Disney shorts, Melody and Toot, Whistle, Plunk, and Boom (voiced then by Bill Thompson). Professor Owl (now voiced by Corey Burton) hosts some of the videos, while either Jiminy Cricket or Ludwig Von Drake host others. Later volumes, as well as the two Christmas videos, do not feature a host at all. Footage of scenes with Jiminy Cricket and Ludwig Von Drake were taken from television programs, including the Walt Disney anthology television series and The Mickey Mouse Club, which featured the characters in the 1950s and 1960s.

== History ==
The first of four distinct waves was issued beginning on October 14, 1986, with Zip-a-Dee-Doo-Dah, which would be followed by five more volumes. The second wave was released beginning on August 14, 1990 with Under the Sea and Disneyland Fun, featuring a new package design and reissued volumes labeled One (1) through Twelve (12) in North America (worldwide, volume numbers). The third wave, which began with 1994's first two volumes of a live-action offshoot set in the style of Disneyland Fun called Mickey's Fun Songs, followed by Circle of Life, saw another new package design and the re-release of all previous volumes (excluding Fun with Music, repackaged as 101 Notes of Fun for markets outside North America). By 1996, this series folded Mickey's Fun Songs (which, at the time, already spawned a third volume released in 1995). Spanish-language editions of some volumes were also released (Disney Canta Con Nosotros). Some songs moved to newer volumes as well. The final release in this wave was Flik's Musical Adventure at Disney's Animal Kingdom on June 8, 1999. In the remixed opening and closing themes, the remixed opening can be heard on Friend Like Me, Circle of Life, Honor to Us All, and Collection of All-Time Favorites, and the remixed closing can be heard on the 1993 edition of Heigh-Ho, as well as Friend Like Me, Circle of Life, and Collection of All-Time Favorites. This wave also abandoned any new volume numbers, included only sporadically. A special three-volume set, called Collection of All-Time Favorites, was released in 1997. There have been over 30 titles released on home video. Newly remastered editions were released on VHS and DVD beginning in 2002, beginning with Very Merry Christmas Songs, featuring a new package design, bonus features, and some new songs. Some DVD releases include individual songs as bonus features. Winnie-the-Pooh Sing a Song volumes were then folded into the Sing Along Songs series. The fourth wave featured Sebastian the Crab (from The Little Mermaid) singing the theme song, replacing Professor Owl.

Following the advent of YouTube's online video-sharing platform, Disney has chosen to release individual sing-along videos on their channel, thus discontinuing the video series.

== List of titles ==
=== Zip-a-Dee-Doo-Dah (1986) ===
Song List
1. The Mickey Mouse Club March (The Mickey Mouse Club TV Series)
2. Zip-a-Dee-Doo-Dah (Song of the South)
3. Following the Leader (Peter Pan)
4. It's a Small World (Disneyland)
5. The Unbirthday Song (Alice in Wonderland)
6. Bibbidi-Bobbidi-Boo (Cinderella)
7. Casey Junior (Dumbo)
8. The Ballad of Davy Crockett (Davy Crockett TV Series)
9. Give a Little Whistle (Pinocchio)
10. Whistle While You Work (Snow White and the Seven Dwarfs)
11. Zip-a-Dee-Doo-Dah Reprise

Volume notes

- Hosted by Professor Owl
- Originally issued to promote the November 21, 1986, theatrical re-release of Song of the South, celebrating the film's 40th Anniversary, and representing the launch of the new series.
- Footage for the song "It's a Small World" was taken from Disneyland Goes to the World's Fair, which aired May 17, 1964. On the song itself, the pitch appears to be shifted one semitone higher on the recording after the snake charmer-style music.
- Ending footage to "Zip-a-Dee-Doo-Dah Reprise" was taken from This is Your Life, Donald Duck, where the Disney gang comes to pay tribute to Mickey, Donald and Goofy.
- Both the 1986 original print and 2001 print featured Sorcerer Mickey with "presents" appearing below it.
- For some reason, the 2001 print starts with the same promo featured at the end of the 1991 print, then goes on to Sorcerer Mickey and then the updated title graphic.
- Known as Cancion del Sur: Zip-a-Dee-Doo-Dah in Spanish, released in Spain.
- Known as Cendrillon: Bibbidi-Bobbidi-Boo in French, released in France and the United States.

=== Heigh-Ho (1987) ===
Song List
1. Heigh-Ho (Snow White and the Seven Dwarfs)
2. Up, Down and Touch the Ground (Winnie the Pooh and the Honey Tree or The Many Adventures of Winnie the Pooh)
3. Hi-Diddle-Dee-Dee (An Actor's Life for Me) (Pinocchio)
4. Yo-Ho (Pirates of the Caribbean)†
5. The Silly Song (The Dwarf's Yodel Song) (Snow White and the Seven Dwarfs)
6. A Cowboy Needs a Horse (A Cowboy Needs a Horse)
7. The Three Caballeros (The Three Caballeros)
8. Theme from Zorro (Zorro TV Series)
9. The Siamese Cat Song (Lady and the Tramp)†
10. Let's Go Fly a Kite (Mary Poppins)
11. Heigh-Ho Reprise

Volume notes

- Hosted by Professor Owl
- Released in 1987 to promote the theatrical re-release of Snow White and the Seven Dwarfs on the film's 50th Anniversary
- Though designated in 1990 as Volume One (just as Snow White is "Animated Feature #1"), Sing Along Songs: Heigh Ho was the second release, preceded by Sing Along Songs: Zip-a-Dee-Doo-Dah (1986). However, it was designated as Volume Four in the UK.
- There is extensive use of footage from Adventures in Music: Melody and Toot, Whistle, Plunk, and Boom throughout the entire program, with a new script synched to the old video.
- The 1993 edition features a preview for all eleven numbered volumes to date.
- Footage of Pirates of the Caribbean in the song Yo Ho was taken from Disneyland: From the Pirates of the Caribbean to the World of Tomorrow, which aired January 21, 1968
- †"The Siamese Cat Song" was cut from the 1996 print, but returns in Honor to Us All and is retained on the Spanish version.
- †"Yo-Ho" was cut from the 1993 and 1996 prints, but is retained on the Spanish version.
- The 1993 edition includes the remixed closing theme, which was also heard on Friend Like Me, Circle of Life, From Hercules and Collection of All Time Favorites.
- Known as Blanca Nieves: Heigh-Ho in Spanish, released in Spain, Latin America, and the United States.
- Known as Blanche-Neige: He Ho in French, released in France and the United States.

=== The Bare Necessities (1987) ===
Song List
1. The Bare Necessities (The Jungle Book)
2. You Are a Human Animal (The Mickey Mouse Club TV Series)
3. Cinderella Work Song (Cinderella)
4. Old Yeller (Old Yeller)
5. Figaro and Cleo (Figaro and Cleo - 1943 cartoon short)
6. Winnie the Pooh (Winnie the Pooh Featurettes)
7. I Wan'na Be Like You (The Jungle Book)
8. Look Out for Mr. Stork (Dumbo)
9. Everybody Wants to Be a Cat (The Aristocats)
10. The Ugly Bug Ball (Summer Magic)
11. The Bare Necessities Reprise

Volume notes

- Hosted by Jiminy Cricket
- Released in 1987 to mark the 20th Anniversary of The Jungle Book.
- Known as El Libro de la Selva: Ritmo en la Selva in Spanish, released in Spain, and only a limited number of copies were released in the United States.
- Known as Le Livre de la Jungle: Il En Faut Peu Pour Être Heureux in French, released in France.

=== You Can Fly! (1988) ===
Song List
1. You Can Fly! (Peter Pan)
2. The Beautiful Briny (Bedknobs and Broomsticks)
3. Colonel Hathi's March (The Jungle Book)
4. I've Got No Strings (Pinocchio)
5. Little Black Rain Cloud (Winnie the Pooh and the Honey Tree or The Many Adventures of Winnie the Pooh)
6. The Merrily Song (The Adventures of Ichabod and Mr. Toad)
7. He's a Tramp (Lady and the Tramp)†
8. Step in Time (Mary Poppins)
9. When I See an Elephant Fly (Dumbo)
10. You Can Fly Reprise

Volume notes

- Hosted by Ludwig Von Drake
- Released in 1988 to mark the 35th Anniversary of Peter Pan.
- †"He's a Tramp" was cut from the 1996 English print, but was retained in the Spanish version.
- Known as Peter Pan: Volorás, Volorás in Spanish, released in Spain, Latin America, and the United States.
- Known as Peter Pan: Tu T'Envoles in French, released in France and the United States.

=== Very Merry Christmas Songs (1988) ===
Song List
1. From All of Us to All of You
2. It's Beginning to Look a Lot Like Christmas†
3. Winnie the Pooh's Jingle Bells†
4. Toyland†
5. All I Want for Christmas Is My Two Front Teeth†
6. Deck the Halls
7. Jingle Bells
8. Joy to the World
9. Up on the Housetop
10. Let It Snow! Let It Snow! Let It Snow!
11. Sleigh Ride
12. Parade of the Wooden Soldiers
13. Winter Wonderland
14. Here Comes Santa Claus
15. Rudolph the Red-Nosed Reindeer
16. Silent Night
17. Seasons of Giving†
18. As Long as There's Christmas†
19. Jingle Bell Rock†
20. Rockin' Around the Christmas Tree†
21. White Christmas†
22. The Best Christmas of All†
23. We Wish You a Merry Christmas

Volume notes

- † Songs featured only on the 2002 release
- The first three prints of the program opened with the song "From All of Us to All of You", sung by Jiminy Cricket, with Mickey Mouse playing the piano. It was cut from the 2002 print, replaced with a voice-over and a Christmas setting instead of transition cards.
- During the end credits shown on the original version, a wide shot still frame background of the Christmas tree from the beginning of Lady and the Tramp is shown.
- Known as Feliz Navidad in Spanish, released in Spain.

=== Fun with Music (1989) ===
Song List
1. Fun with Music (Mickey Mouse Club)
2. Why Should I Worry? (Oliver & Company)
3. With a Smile and a Song (Snow White and the Seven Dwarfs)
4. Let's All Sing Like the Birdies Sing (Disneyland's Enchanted Tiki Room)
5. Cruella de Vil (101 Dalmatians)†
6. All in the Golden Afternoon (Alice in Wonderland)
7. Strolling Through the Park (The Nifty Nineties)
8. Boo Boo Boo (A Symposium on Popular Songs)
9. The Green with Envy Blues (Adventures in Color)
10. Good Company (Oliver & Company)
11. Blue Danube Waltz (Square Peg in a Round Hole)
12. Old MacDonald Had a Band (Toot, Whistle, Plunk, and Boom, Jack and Old Mac)
13. Scales and Arpeggios (The Aristocats)
14. Why Should I Worry? Reprise
15. Cruella de Vil Reprise†

Volume notes

- Co-hosted by Professor Owl and Ludwig Von Drake. At the beginning of the program, Professor Owl hosts. When "All in the Golden Afternoon" ends, Ludwig Von Drake takes over as host. Finally, after "Blue Danube Waltz" is over, Professor Owl takes over as host for the rest of the program.
- The song "Let's All Sing Like the Birdies Sing" includes a montage with Disney birds from Bambi and the Silly Symphonies cartoon Birds in the Spring.
- "Old MacDonald Had a Band" first appeared in the Disney short Jack and Old Mac, but is here credited to the Toot, Whistle, Plunk, and Boom episode of Walt Disney Presents.
- This installment was the first to promote, and feature songs from, a then recently released Disney film (in this case, Oliver & Company). Prior to this, most installments promoted anniversary re-releases of older films.
- Retitled 101 Notes of Fun in the UK and other countries, where it was not released until 1994.
- † "Cruella de Vil" appears in 101 Notes of Fun and replaces "Let's All Sing Like the Birdies Sing". It also replaces the reprise of "Why Should I Worry?".
- The end credits mistakenly credit Eva Gabor, who didn't sing any of the songs in The Aristocats (Robie Lester did), and also does not credit Roscoe Lee Browne (voice of Francis in Oliver & Company), as he sang in the final scene as well.
- Known as 101 Dalmatas: Notas Musicales in Spanish, released in Spain. Also known as 101 Dalmatas: 101 Notas Musicales.
- Known as Les 101 Dalmatiens: 101 Notes de Musique in French, released in France.

=== Under the Sea (1990) ===
Song List
1. Under the Sea (The Little Mermaid)
2. By the Beautiful Sea
3. Never Smile at a Crocodile (Peter Pan)
4. That's What Makes the World Go Round (The Sword in the Stone)
5. Kiss the Girl (The Little Mermaid)
6. At the Codfish Ball
7. Sailing, Sailing/Sailor's Hornpipe
8. A Whale of a Tale (20,000 Leagues Under the Sea)
9. Someone's Waiting for You (The Rescuers)
10. Under the Sea Reprise

Volume notes

- Hosted by Ludwig Von Drake
- The first Disney Sing-Along Songs videocassette to feature familiar tunes not from Disney movies, set to clips from Disney movies and cartoons (merely marked as "Disney scenes").
- The first volume to credit the Quantel Paintbox in the end credits. Mike Bonner was credited as "Paintbox artist" for both this volume and "I Love to Laugh".
- The original 1990 release included a Disneyland 35th anniversary graphic at the beginning of the video.
- Known as La Sirenita: Bajo el Mar in Spanish, released in Spain, Latin America, and the United States.
- Known as La Petite Sirène: Sous L'Ocean in French, released in France and the United States.

=== Disneyland Fun (1990) ===
A full day of Disneyland is shown over Disney hit songs. A remake of Disneyland Fun set at what was then known as Euro Disney Resort was released in 1993 under the name Let's Go to Disneyland Paris!.

Song List

Disneyland

1. Whistle While You Work (Snow White and the Seven Dwarfs)
2. Step in Time (Mary Poppins)
3. I'm Walkin' Right Down the Middle of Main Street U.S.A. (Walt Disney World and Disneyland)
4. Following the Leader (Peter Pan)
5. The Great Outdoors
6. Zip-a-Dee-Doo-Dah (Song of the South)
7. Rumbly in My Tumbly (Winnie the Pooh and the Honey Tree)
8. It's a Small World (Walt Disney World and Disneyland)
9. Making Memories
10. Grim Grinning Ghosts (The Haunted Mansion)
11. The Character Parade (Walt Disney World and Disneyland)
12. When You Wish upon a Star (Pinocchio)

Euro Disneyland

1. Whistle While You Work (Snow White and the Seven Dwarfs)
2. Step in Time (Mary Poppins)
3. I'm Walkin' Right Down the Middle of Main Street U.S.A. (Walt Disney World and Disneyland)
4. Following the Leader (Peter Pan)
5. Zip-a-Dee-Doo-Dah (Song of the South)
6. How D'Ye Do and Shake Hands (Alice in Wonderland)
7. The Unbirthday Song (Alice in Wonderland)
8. Rumbly in My Tumbly (Winnie the Pooh and the Honey Tree)
9. Pecos Bill (Melody Time)
10. It's a Small World (Walt Disney World and Disneyland)
11. Grim Grinning Ghosts (The Haunted Mansion)
12. The Character Parade (Walt Disney World and Disneyland)
13. When You Wish upon a Star (Pinocchio)

Volume notes

- Released in 1990 to mark the 35th Anniversary of Disneyland.
- This was the first Disney theme park Sing-Along video.
- After an introductory sequence, the sing-along commences with footage of the rides and attractions of Disneyland, with the appropriate characters' voice actors/actresses dubbing lines of their costumed character counterparts.
- The 1994 print introduced a new opening graphic for the series.
- This volume was given a DVD release in 2005 as part of the Happiest Homecoming on Earth.
- During "Following the Leader", the kids follow Donald Duck in Disneyland and Peter Pan in Euro Disneyland.
- "Zip-a-Dee-Doo-Dah" includes a rap verse not present in the original version.
- Roger Rabbit from Who Framed Roger Rabbit stars alongside the main Disney characters.
- Let's Go to Disneyland Paris! was released in 1993.
- More modern characters such as Ariel, Beast, Belle, Aladdin, Jasmine, Jafar, Iago, Genie, Launchpad McQuack, Grammi Gummi, Sunni Gummi, and Tummi Gummi appear in Let's Go to Disneyland Paris!
- More dialogue is used in Let's Go to Disneyland Paris! than in Disneyland Fun.
- Known as Vamos a Disneyland Paris in Spanish, released in Spain. There is no Spanish version for Disneyland Fun.
- Known as En Route Pour Euro Disneyland in French, released in France. There is no French version for Disneyland Fun.

=== I Love to Laugh! (1991) ===
Song List
1. I Love to Laugh (Mary Poppins)
2. Ev'rybody Has a Laughing Place (Song of the South)
3. Bluddle-Uddle-Um-Dum (The Washing Song) (Snow White and the Seven Dwarfs)
4. Supercalifragilisticexpialidocious (Mary Poppins)
5. Quack, Quack, Quack, Donald Duck (A Day in the Life of Donald Duck)
6. Oo-De-Lally (Robin Hood)
7. Who's Afraid of the Big Bad Wolf? (The Three Little Pigs)
8. The Wonderful Thing About Tiggers (Winnie the Pooh and Tigger Too or The Many Adventures of Winnie the Pooh)
9. Pink Elephants on Parade (Dumbo)
10. Jolly Holiday (Mary Poppins)

Volume notes

- Hosted by Ludwig Von Drake
- Retitled Supercalifragilisticexpialidocious for the 1994 print, featuring the new graphic at the start and end.
- The 1994 print featured the gold WDHV logo (with blue background) in lieu of the 1986 Sorcerer Mickey WDHV logo.
- Known as Mary Poppins: Supercalifagilistico in Spanish, released in Spain and Latin America.
- Known as Mary Poppins: C'est Bon de Rire in French, released in France and the United States.

=== Be Our Guest (1992) ===
Song List
1. Be Our Guest (Beauty and the Beast)
2. A Spoonful of Sugar (Mary Poppins)
3. Little Wooden Head (Pinocchio)†
4. Bella Notte (Lady and the Tramp)
5. Heffalumps and Woozles (Winnie the Pooh and the Blustery Day or The Many Adventures of Winnie the Pooh)
6. Beauty and the Beast (Beauty and the Beast)
7. The World's Greatest Criminal Mind (The Great Mouse Detective)
8. Chim Chim Cher-ee (Mary Poppins)
9. Once Upon a Dream (Sleeping Beauty)
10. Be Our Guest Reprise

Volume notes

- Hosted by Jiminy Cricket
- † "Little Wooden Head" was cut from prints that had been released since late 1992, but returns in Colors of the Wind.
- Known as La Bella y el Bestia: Nuestro Huésped in Spanish, released in Spain, Latin America, and the United States. Known as Qué Festin in Spain.
- Known as La Belle et la Bête: C'est la Fête in French, released in France and the United States.

=== Friend Like Me (1993) ===
Song List
1. Friend Like Me (Aladdin)
2. Best of Friends (The Fox and the Hound)
3. Something There (Beauty and the Beast)
4. How Do You Do? (Song of the South)
5. Friendship (performed by Mickey, Donald and Goofy)
6. In Harmony (The Little Mermaid TV Series)
7. Let's Get Together (The Parent Trap)
8. That's What Friends Are For (The Jungle Book)
9. A Whole New World (Aladdin)
10. Friend Like Me Reprise

Volume notes

- Hosted by Jiminy Cricket
- This was the first volume to have a different intro to the theme song play over the opening graphics. In place of the standard intro, we hear the last couple of bars of Friend Like Me, with the title Friend Like Me appearing in Disney's Aladdin-style font, framed by blue and purple smoke, continuing into the remixed opening theme. The remixed opening was heard on Circle of Life, Honor to Us All, Collection of All-Time Favorites, and the UK versions of Colors of the Wind and The Hunchback of Notre Dame in Spanish, while the remixed closing theme was also heard on the 1993 edition of Heigh-Ho, as well as Circle of Life, Collection of All-Time Favorites, and Honor to Us All.
- Known as Aladdin: Un Amigo Fiel in Spanish, released in Spain, Latin America, and the United States. Also known as Un Amigo Genial.
- Known as Aladdin: Je Suis Ton Meilleur Ami in French, released in France and the United States.
- Instead of Professor Owl introducing Jiminy Cricket, Jiminy Cricket just shows up at the very beginning of the program.
- This is the first time that Professor Owl did not introduce the host.

=== The Twelve Days of Christmas (1993) ===
The gang spends Christmas at Mickey's Log Cabin and at Disneyland.

Song List
1. Very Merry Christmas
2. Deck the Halls
3. Dear Santa
4. Jingle Bells
5. Snow Ho Ho
6. Hip Hop Noel
7. He Delivers
8. The Twelve Days of Christmas
9. I'd Like to Have an Elephant for Christmas
10. Here Comes Santa
11. O Christmas Tree/We Wish You a Merry Christmas

Volume notes

- No host (voiceover only)
- The song "Here Comes Santa" features highlights of the Disneyland Christmas Fantasy Parade

=== Campout at Walt Disney World (1994) ===
The gang spends time in the great outdoors at Fort Wilderness at Walt Disney World.

Song List
1. Let's Go (Mickey's Fun Songs Theme)†
2. Comin' 'Round the Mountain
3. The Bare Necessities (The Jungle Book)
4. The Caissons Go Rolling Along
5. The Happy Wanderer
6. Oh! Susanna
7. Camptown Races
8. By the Beautiful Sea
9. Don't Fence Me In
10. Turkey in the Straw
11. Talent Roundup
12. Jeepers Creepers
13. Mountain Greenery
14. Take Me Home, Country Roads (John Denver)
15. If You're Happy and You Know It
16. Goodnight Campers

Volume notes

- † "Let's Go" is only present in the original version.
- Originally released as Mickey's Fun Songs - Campout at Walt Disney World, later reissued in the Sing-Along Songs series.
- Christian Buenaventura, Tiffany Burton, Michelle Montoya and Shira Roth from Kidsongs make appearances in the video.

=== Let's Go to the Circus! (1994) ===
Mickey and the gang visit Ringling Bros. and Barnum & Bailey Circus.

Song List
1. Let's Go (Mickey's Fun Songs Theme)†
2. Rainbow World
3. The Circus on Parade
4. Upside Down (Diana Ross)
5. Aba Daba Honeymoon
6. I Wan'na Be Like You (The Jungle Book)
7. The Man on the Flying Trapeze
8. Over and Over Again
9. Those Magnificent Men in Their Flying Machines
10. Make 'Em Laugh (Singin' in the Rain)
11. The Bells
12. Animal Calypso
13. Jump Rope
14. Be a Clown (The Pirate)
15. Join the Circus

Volume notes

- † "Let's Go" is only present in the original version.
- Originally released as Mickey's Fun Songs - Let's Go to the Circus!, later reissued in the Sing-Along Songs series.
- Barry Manilow is reported to have composed the score for this volume and wrote two original songs with Bruce Sussman, though they are credited as written by Andy Belling and Nick Allen.
- This is the only Disney live-action video that doesn't take place at Walt Disney World, even though Disney characters are shown.
- Christian Buenaventura, Tiffany Burton and Michelle Montoya from Kidsongs, along with child actor Tahj Mowry, make appearances in this video.
- David Larible and Eric Michael Gillett make guest appearances in this video.
- Samuel E. Wright is credited as the singer for "Animal Calypso".

=== Circle of Life (1994) ===
Song List
1. Circle of Life (The Lion King)
2. Part of Your World (The Little Mermaid)
3. Prince Ali (Aladdin)
4. I Just Can't Wait to Be King (The Lion King)
5. Belle (Beauty and the Beast)
6. Following the Leader (Peter Pan)†
7. Everybody Wants to Be a Cat (The Aristocats)
8. Hakuna Matata (The Lion King)^
9. The Lion Sleeps Tonight (The Lion King's Timon & Pumbaa)^
10. Yummy Yummy Yummy (The Lion King's Timon & Pumbaa)^
11. W-I-L-D (The Jungle Book 2)^
12. Jungle Rhythm (The Jungle Book 2)^
13. When You Wish Upon a Star (Pinocchio)

Volume notes

- Hosted by Jiminy Cricket (Original edition only. 2003 edition featured voiceover only)
- † "Following the Leader" is only in the UK version and replaces "Everybody Wants to Be a Cat".
- ^ Songs on the 2003 release
- 2003 DVD release includes a Vocabulary Game and Guess That Song. "We Are One" and "Upendi" from The Lion King II: Simba's Pride are shown as a bonus when you complete the Advanced Level of the Vocabulary Game and Song #3 of "Guess That Song" respectively, but they don't have any sing-along lyrics.
- Known as El Rey Leon: El Ciclo Sin Fin in Spanish, released in Spain. Also known as El Ciclo de la Vida.
- Known as Le Roi Lion: Le Cycle de la Vie in French, released in France and the United States.

=== Beach Party at Walt Disney World (1995) ===
Mickey and the gang have a big beach party.

Song List
1. Let's Go (Mickey's Fun Songs Theme)†
2. Celebration (Kool & the Gang)
3. Set Your Name Free
4. Surfin' Safari (The Beach Boys)
5. Three Little Fishies
6. A Pirate's Life (Peter Pan)
7. Part of Your World (The Little Mermaid)
8. Hot, Hot, Hot (Arrow)
9. The Hukilau Song
10. Pearly Shells
11. Limbo Rock (Chubby Checker)
12. Slicin' Sand (Elvis Presley)

Volume notes

- † "Let's Go" is only present in the original version.
- Originally released as Mickey's Fun Songs - Beach Party at Walt Disney World, later reissued in the Sing-Along Songs series.
- Mario "Boo" Bailey and Tiffany Burton from Kidsongs make appearances in this video.

=== Colors of the Wind (1995) ===
Song List
1. Just Around the Riverbend (Pocahontas)
2. Cinderella Work Song (Cinderella)
3. Why Should I Worry? (Oliver & Company)
4. Casey Junior (Dumbo)†
5. Hakuna Matata (The Lion King)†^
6. Oo-De-Lally (Robin Hood)†
7. Little Wooden Head (Pinocchio)
8. Can You Feel the Love Tonight (The Lion King)
9. Higitus Figitus (The Sword in the Stone)
10. Let's All Sing Like the Birdies Sing (Disneyland's Enchanted Tiki Room)†^
11. Colors of the Wind (Pocahontas)

Volume notes

- Hosted by Ludwig Von Drake
- Features the return of "Little Wooden Head", cut from the 1993 edition of Be Our Guest
- Known as Colours of the Wind in the UK, because of spelling differences in UK English and US English.
- VHS edition features updated preview for the 3rd series, plus a preview for the Mickey's Fun Songs three tape series
- † Songs in foreign versions and replace "Cinderella Work Song" and "Why Should I Worry?".
- †^ "Let's All Sing Like the Birdies Sing" only appears in foreign English versions (e.g. UK, Australia, etc.) and is replaced by "Hakuna Matata" in other countries.
- The "Can You Feel the Love Tonight" sing along has a new montage of Disney Lovers.
- The UK version of Colours of the Wind has new lettering and a Mickey bouncing ball with a feather band around its head (applies to releases in other countries).
- The Colors of the Wind laserdisc also included Mickey's Fun Songs: Let's Go to the Circus.
- Known as Pocahontas: Colores en el Viento in Spanish, released in Spain.
- Known as Pocahontas: L'Air du Vent in French, released in France.

=== Topsy Turvy (1996) ===
Song List
1. Topsy Turvy (The Hunchback of Notre Dame)
2. You've Got a Friend in Me (Toy Story)
3. Stand by Me (Timon & Pumbaa Music Video)
4. Father and Son (Aladdin and the King of Thieves)†
5. Streets of Gold (Oliver & Company)
6. The Dwarfs' Yodel Song (The Silly Song) (Snow White and the Seven Dwarfs)
7. On the Open Road (A Goofy Movie)†
8. Out There (The Hunchback of Notre Dame)
9. Family (James and the Giant Peach)
10. The Unbirthday Song (Alice in Wonderland)
11. Mine, Mine, Mine (Pocahontas)†
12. Sing a New Song (Ariel's Undersea Adventures)†
13. Forget About Love (The Return of Jafar)†
14. What's This? (The Nightmare Before Christmas)†
15. Topsy Turvy Reprise

Volume notes

- Retitled as From The Hunchback of Notre Dame in the UK and other countries.
- Segments only (no host)
- † Songs featured in From The Hunchback of Notre Dame which replaced "Stand by Me", "The Dwarfs' Yodel Song (The Silly Song)", "Family", and "The Unbirthday Song".
- Known as El Jorobado de Notre Dame in Spanish, released in Spain.
- Known as Le Bossu de Notre Dame: Charivari in French, released in France.
- The lyrics "It's the day the devil in us gets released. It's the day we mock the pig and shock the priest" were changed to "Good is bad and best is worst and west is east. On the day, we think the most of those with least" to excise religious references. Esmeralda's pole-dancing scene was also cut to discourage sinful thoughts and sensations.
- The beginning of the song "Out There" is cut due to general misery.

=== Pongo and Perdita (1996) ===
Pongo, Perdita, and the puppies prepare for the Bow Wow Ball.

Song List
1. Zip-a-Dee-Doo-Dah (Song of the South)
2. Following the Leader (Peter Pan)
3. Do Your Ears Hang Low? (Traditional)
4. (Going to) The Bow-Wow Ball
5. Hokey Puppy (Hokey Pokey) (Traditional)
6. Pongo (Bingo) (Traditional)
7. Take Me Out to the Ball Game (Traditional)
8. Oh Where, Oh Where Has My Little Dog Gone? (Traditional)
9. Hot Diggity (Dog Ziggity Boom)
10. The More We Get Together (Traditional)

Volume notes

- The "Following the Leader" segment actually used a recording of the version in Disneyland Fun.
- The only volume without sing-along words on the screen, though it is Closed Captioned (CC) for the hearing impaired (as are most volumes), and sing-along lyrics have been added to the 2006 DVD release (though still incomplete)

=== From Hercules (1997) ===
Song List
1. Zero to Hero (Hercules)
2. A Guy Like You (The Hunchback of Notre Dame)
3. Our Miss Minnie (Minnie's Greatest Hits)
4. After Today (A Goofy Movie)
5. Rescue Aid Society (The Rescuers)
6. Take Your Sweet Time (Jungle Cubs-Born to Be Wild)
7. Out of Thin Air (Aladdin and the King of Thieves)
8. Pecos Bill (Melody Time)
9. You Can Fly! (Peter Pan)
10. Adventure is a Wonderful Thing (Winnie the Pooh's Most Grand Adventure) (Known as Pooh's Grand Adventure: The Search for Christopher Robin in the US)
11. In a World of My Own (Alice in Wonderland)
12. One Last Hope (Hercules)

Volume Notes

- Released in all parts of the world except the US
- Segments only (no host)
- In the song "Pecos Bill", Pecos Bill is shown having a cigarette in his mouth, which is censored in Home on the Range: Little Patch of Heaven due to references of tobacco use.
- The verse about the Painted Indians in "You Can Fly!" is cut in this volume, but appears in Home on the Range: Little Patch of Heaven.
- Known as Hércules in Spanish, released in Spain.
- Known as Hercule: Héros de Tous les Héros in French, released in France.

=== Collection of All Time Favorites: The Early Years (1997) ===
Song List
1. Zip-a-Dee-Doo-Dah (Song of the South)
2. Give a Little Whistle (Pinocchio)
3. Whistle While You Work (Snow White and the Seven Dwarfs)
4. Who's Afraid of the Big Bad Wolf? (Three Little Pigs)
5. Casey Junior (Dumbo)
6. The Merrily Song (The Adventures of Ichabod and Mr. Toad)
7. Little Wooden Head (Pinocchio)
8. Heigh-Ho (Snow White and the Seven Dwarfs)
9. When I See an Elephant Fly (Dumbo)
10. The Three Caballeros (The Three Caballeros)
11. Bluddle-Uddle-Um-Dum (The Washing Song) (Snow White and the Seven Dwarfs)
12. Everybody Has a Laughing Place (Song of the South)
13. When You Wish Upon a Star (Pinocchio)

Volume notes

- Hosted by Professor Owl (voiceover only, before all songs)
- Features songs from 1933–1949

=== Collection of All Time Favorites: The Magic Years (1997) ===
Song List
1. You Can Fly! (Peter Pan)
2. The Bare Necessities (The Jungle Book)
3. The Mickey Mouse Club March (The Mickey Mouse Club)
4. Following the Leader (Peter Pan)
5. That's What Makes the World Go Round (The Sword in the Stone)
6. Once Upon a Dream (Sleeping Beauty)
7. Oo-De-Lally (Robin Hood)
8. Bibbidi-Bobbidi-Boo (Cinderella)
9. Bella Notte (Lady and the Tramp)
10. All in the Golden Afternoon (Alice in Wonderland)
11. Higitus Figitus (The Sword in the Stone)
12. A Spoonful of Sugar (Mary Poppins)
13. Scales and Arpeggios (The Aristocats)
14. I Wan'na Be Like You (The Jungle Book)

Volume notes

- Hosted by Professor Owl (voiceover only, before all songs)
- Features songs from 1950–1973

=== Collection of All-Time Favorites: The Modern Classics (1997) ===
Song List
1. Circle of Life (The Lion King)
2. Be Our Guest (Beauty and the Beast)
3. One Last Hope (Hercules)
4. Under the Sea (The Little Mermaid)
5. A Whole New World (Aladdin)
6. Topsy Turvy (The Hunchback of Notre Dame)
7. Colors of the Wind (Pocahontas)
8. Prince Ali (Aladdin)
9. Part of Your World (The Little Mermaid)
10. Zero to Hero (Hercules)

Volume notes

- Hosted by Professor Owl (voiceover only, before all songs)
- Features songs from 1989–1997

=== Honor to Us All (1998) ===
Song List
1. Honor to Us All (Mulan)
2. Zero to Hero (Hercules)
3. The Siamese Cat Song (Lady and the Tramp)
4. Where Do I Go from Here? (Pocahontas II: Journey to a New World)
5. A Guy Like You (The Hunchback of Notre Dame)
6. A Dream Is a Wish Your Heart Makes (Cinderella)
7. We Are One (The Lion King II: Simba's Pride)
8. A Little Thought (Belle's Magical World)
9. On the Open Road (A Goofy Movie)
10. I Won't Say (I'm in Love) (Hercules)
11. Father and Son (Aladdin and the King of Thieves)
12. I'll Make a Man Out of You (Mulan)

Volume notes

- Hosted by Professor Owl (voiceover only, before first song only)
- Features the return of "The Siamese Cat Song", cut from the 1994 edition of Heigh-Ho

=== Happy Haunting - Party at Disneyland! (1998) ===
Mickey and the gang have a spooky halloween party at a haunted house.

Song List
1. It's Halloween
2. Five Little Pumpkins (Traditional)
3. Grim Grinning Ghosts (The Haunted Mansion)
4. Chicken Lips and Lizard Hips (John and Nancy Cassidy)
5. Headless Horseman (The Adventures of Ichabod and Mr. Toad)
6. Five Little Witches
7. Spooky Scary Skeletons
8. Casting My Spell
9. Trick or Treat
10. Monster Mash

Volume notes

- Hosted by the Magic Mirror (Corey Burton)

=== Sing a Song with Pooh Bear (and Piglet Too!) (1999) ===
Song List
1. Winnie the Pooh (Winnie the Pooh Featurettes)
2. Winnie the Pooh (Piglet's Big Movie)†
3. Rumbly in My Tumbly (Winnie the Pooh and the Honey Tree)
4. The Wonderful Thing About Tiggers (Winnie the Pooh and Tigger Too)
5. The Kanga Roo Hop (Kanga & Roo's Song)
6. Try a Little Something New/High and Low Medley (Welcome to Pooh Corner)
7. With a Few Good Friends (Piglet's Big Movie)†
8. The One and Only One (Piglet & Eeyore's Song)
9. The Floating Song (Balloonatics)
10. Harvest What You Grow (Rabbit's Song)
11. Heffalumps and Woozles (Winnie the Pooh and the Blustery Day)
12. Nothing is Too Good for a Friend (The Piglet Who Would Be King)
13. Sing Ho for the Life of a Bear (Piglet's Big Movie)†
14. My Song (Winnie-the-Pooh's Song)

Volume notes

- DVD released in April 2003 as "Sing a Song with Pooh Bear & Piglet Too!", to coincide with the theatrical release of Piglet's Big Movie.
- † Songs seen only in the 2003 edition
- Originally released as Winnie the Pooh: Sing a Song with Pooh Bear, later reissued in the Sing Along Songs series under a new name with new songs. Also released in the UK, albeit only on VHS.
- Featured at the end of the original release from 1999, Gopher hosts "How to Draw", as he shows you how to draw Pooh's face.

=== Flik's Musical Adventure at Disney's Animal Kingdom (1999) ===
Flik, Mickey, Minnie, and the rest of the gang spend the day at Disney's Animal Kingdom.

Song List
1. Welcome to Harambe
2. On Safari
3. I Wan'na Be Like You (The Jungle Book)
4. You Must Have Been a Beautiful Baby (Johnny Mercer and Harry Warren; made famous by Bing Crosby, Bobby Darin, and others)
5. Walk the Dinosaur (Was (Not Was))
6. It's a Bug's World (Based on "It's a Small World")
7. Asia (Based on "The Siamese Cat Song")
8. He Lives in You (The Lion King II: Simba's Pride)
9. Circle of Life (The Lion King)

Volume notes

- Hosted by Flik the Ant from Disney/Pixar's A Bug's Life voiced by Wally Wingert.

=== Winnie the Pooh - Sing a Song with Tigger (2000) ===
Song List
1. The Scrapbook Song
2. The Wonderful Thing About Tiggers (The Many Adventures of Winnie the Pooh)
3. The Whoop-de-Dooper Bounce (The Tigger Movie)
4. Forever and Ever (Pooh's Grand Adventure: The Search for Christopher Robin)
5. Round My Family Tree (The Tigger Movie)
6. I Wanna Scare Myself (Boo! To You!)
7. Playing in the Wood
8. King of the Beasties (King of the Beasties)
9. How to Be a Tigger (The Tigger Movie)
10. Pirates is What We'll Be (Rabbit Marks the Spot)
11. Everything is Right (Pooh's Grand Adventure: The Search for Christopher Robin)
12. The Scrapbook Song Reprise

Volume notes

- Bonus Programming - Tiggerrific Tips on How to Make a Scrapbook!
- Hosted by Tigger, who shows you his scrapbook
- Released in 2000 to promote The Tigger Movie
- This video was not released as a Sing Along Songs volume, rather a "Sing a Song With"..., but otherwise conforms to SAS volume standards.
- Opening credits feature a computer-animated tour of Christopher Robin's bedroom showing his stuffed toys, also shown in Sing a Song with Pooh Bear
- Also features bonus music videos at the end of the video to promote the Walt Disney Gold Classic Collection titles: "A Girl Worth Fighting For" (Mulan), "Scales and Arpeggios" (The Aristocats), "The Best of Friends" (The Fox and the Hound), "Steady as the Beating Drum" (Pocahontas), and "Higitus Figitus" (The Sword in the Stone)

=== Brother Bear - On My Way (2003) ===
Song List
1. On My Way (Brother Bear)
2. Try Again (101 Dalmatians II: Patch's London Adventure)
3. Following the Leader (Peter Pan)
4. Go the Distance (Hercules)
5. I'm Still Here (Treasure Planet)
6. Digga Tunnah (The Lion King 1½)
7. On the Open Road (A Goofy Movie)
8. Aloha, E Komo Mai (Stitch! The Movie)
9. Welcome (Brother Bear)
10. Dance Along: On My Way
11. Dance Along: Try Again
12. Dance Along: Aloha, E Komo Mai

Volume notes

- The first volume to feature a new opening sequence, with the theme song sung by Sebastian from The Little Mermaid
- Hosted by Rutt and Tuke
- Also features Karaoke Mode and three Vocabulary Activities
- "On the Open Road" was presented on Honor to Us All and features a Wilhelm Scream

=== Home on the Range - Little Patch of Heaven (2004) ===
Song List
1. Little Patch of Heaven (Home on the Range)
2. Yodel-Adle-Eedle-Idle-Oo (Home on the Range)
3. Home on the Range - Traditional
4. Oh, Susanna! - Traditional
5. Old MacDonald Had a Farm - Traditional
6. She'll Be Comin' Round the Mountain - Traditional
7. The Farmer in the Dell - Traditional
8. Pecos Bill (Melody Time)
9. A Cowboy Needs a Horse (A Cowboy Needs a Horse)
10. Stanley Rides Again (Stanley's Dinosaur Round-Up)
11. Anytime You Need a Friend (Home on the Range)
12. Dance Along: Little Patch of Heaven
13. Dance Along: Anytime You Need a Friend
14. Dance Along: Yodel-Adle-Eedle-Idle-Oo

Volume notes

- Hosted by Maggie the Cow
- Also features Karaoke Mode and three Vocabulary Activities

=== Disney Princess Sing Along Songs Vol. 1 - Once Upon a Dream (2004) ===
Song List
1. A Dream Is a Wish Your Heart Makes (Cinderella)
2. Part of Your World (The Little Mermaid)
3. A Whole New World (Aladdin)
4. Once Upon a Dream (Sleeping Beauty)
5. I'm Wishing/One Song (Snow White and the Seven Dwarfs)
6. Colors of the Wind (Pocahontas)
7. Beauty and the Beast (Beauty and the Beast)
8. Reflection (Mulan)
9. Like Other Girls (Mulan II)
10. I Won't Say (I'm in Love) (Hercules)
11. Put It Together (Bibbidi Bobbidi Boo) (Cinderella II: Dreams Come True)
12. Sweet Wings of Love (Mickey, Donald, Goofy: The Three Musketeers)
13. If You Can Dream (Featuring all eligible princesses)

Volume notes

- "If You Can Dream" appears to be an original song composed exclusively for this Sing Along Songs volume
- Also features dance alongs, but unlike On My Way and Little Patch of Heaven, the dance alongs are bonus features.

=== Disney Princess Sing Along Songs Vol. 2 - Enchanted Tea Party (2005) ===
Song List
1. So This is Love (Cinderella)
2. Kiss the Girl (The Little Mermaid)
3. Forget About Love (The Return of Jafar)
4. Something There (Beauty and the Beast)
5. Just Around the Riverbend (Pocahontas)
6. Someday My Prince Will Come (Snow White and the Seven Dwarfs)
7. I Wonder (Sleeping Beauty)
8. Honor to Us All (Mulan)
9. Love (Robin Hood)
10. In a World of My Own (Alice in Wonderland)
11. For a Moment (The Little Mermaid II: Return to the Sea)
12. Where Dreams Begin (All New Disney Princess Song)

Volume notes

- DVD includes Princess Tea Time game, Dance Along, Karaoke, Random Play
- "Where Dreams Begin" was newly created for this volume.

=== Disney Princess Sing Along Songs Vol. 3 - Perfectly Princess (2006) ===
Song List
1. In Harmony (The Little Mermaid TV Series)
2. It's What's Inside That Counts (Cinderella II: Dreams Come True)
3. Out of Thin Air (Aladdin and the King of Thieves)
4. A Little Thought (Belle's Magical World)
5. Where Do I Go from Here? (Pocahontas II: Journey to a New World)
6. Whistle While You Work (Snow White and the Seven Dwarfs)
7. All in the Golden Afternoon (Alice in Wonderland)
8. The Work Song (Cinderella)
9. Belle (Beauty and the Beast)
10. Lesson Number One (Mulan II)
11. Here on the Land and Sea (The Little Mermaid II: Return to the Sea)
12. It's Not Just Make Believe (Ella Enchanted)

Volume notes

- Includes Karaoke, Princess Pen Pals, Princess Pals DVD-ROM
