= Snow White (2025 film) =

2025 American musical fantasy film

Disney's Snow White
- Theatrical release poster
- Directed by: Marc Webb
- Screenplay by: Erin Cressida Wilson (Note: Also Greta Gerwig, who is uncredited)
- Based on: Snow White and the Seven Dwarfs by Disney; "Snow White" by the Brothers Grimm
- Produced by: Marc Platt; Jared LeBoff
- Starring: Rachel Zegler; Andrew Burnap; Gal Gadot
- Cinematography: Mandy Walker
- Edited by: Mark Sanger; Sarah Broshar
- Music by: Jeff Morrow
- Production companies: Walt Disney Pictures; Marc Platt Productions
- Distributed by: Walt Disney Studios Motion Pictures
- Release dates: March 12, 2025 (Alcázar of Segovia); March 21, 2025 (United States)
- Running time: 109 minutes
- Country: United States
- Language: English
- Budget: $336.5 million (gross) $271.6 million (net)
- Box office: $205.7 million

Disney's Snow White, or simply Snow White, is a 2025 American musical fantasy film produced by Walt Disney Pictures. It is a live-action remake of Walt Disney's 1937 animated film Snow White and the Seven Dwarfs, itself based on the 1812 fairy tale. Directed by Marc Webb and written by Erin Cressida Wilson, the film stars Rachel Zegler as Snow White, with Andrew Burnap and Gal Gadot in supporting roles. The reimagined story follows the princess Snow White, who escapes assassination by her stepmother, the Evil Queen, and joins with seven magical beings of the forest (Note: Although based on the Seven Dwarfs from the original story, the characters are not referred to as "dwarfs" in the film. The term "magical beings" was used in promotion.) and a rogue bandit named Jonathan to reclaim her kingdom.

Plans for a Snow White remake were confirmed in October 2016, with Wilson attached as a writer. Webb entered talks to direct in May 2019 and was announced as director in September. Principal photography took place in the United Kingdom from March to July 2022, with additional reshoots taking place in London. The film was initially set to be released in March 2024, but faced delays due to the 2023 SAG-AFTRA strike.

Before its release, the film generated significant controversy regarding its color-blind casting, changes to the story, and the reimagining of the Seven Dwarfs. Additional controversy stemmed from Zegler's public critiques of the original film and Donald Trump, as well as her and Gadot's opposing views on the Israeli–Palestinian conflict, leading to calls for boycotts on both political sides.

Snow White premiered at the Alcázar of Segovia in Spain on March 12, 2025, and was released in the United States on March 21, to mixed reviews from critics. One of Disney's most expensive films and its most expensive live-action remake, it was considered by analysts to be a box-office bomb, as it grossed $205.7 million worldwide against a production budget of $336.5 million, losing the studio $170 million. The film later debuted at the top of the viewership charts in the United States upon its release on Disney+.

== Plot ==
Snow White is a princess born to a benevolent king and queen, named for a snowstorm on the day of her birth. She grows up happily as her parents share prosperity with their subjects, but the queen dies of an illness and the king remarries. Before departing to confront a far-off threat warned of by his new wife, the king gifts Snow White a necklace engraved with the words: "Fearless, Fair, Brave, True". He never returns, and the new Queen reveals herself as an evil enchantress obsessed with her own beauty, forcing her subjects to live in poverty and conscripting many into the royal guard. Fearing Snow White's beauty will outshine her own, she confines her stepdaughter to the palace as a scullery maid. Each day, the Queen asks her Magic Mirror who is "the fairest one of all", and the Mirror always responds in her favor.

Years later, Snow White grows into a young woman. One day, while cleaning the castle, she meets Jonathan, a bandit leader who is caught stealing by the Huntsman. The Queen sentences Jonathan to be tied to the palace gates, but Snow White frees him, leading the Magic Mirror to deem her the fairest. Enraged, the Queen orders the Huntsman to take Snow White into the forest, kill her, and bring back her heart in a jeweled box as proof. While Snow White is picking apples in the forest, the Huntsman cannot bring himself to harm her, so he warns her of the Queen's intentions instead. At his urging, Snow White flees deep into the forest.

Lost and frightened, she is befriended by woodland animals who lead her to a secluded cottage, where she falls asleep. She awakens to meet the owners, seven magical beings named Doc, Grumpy, Happy, Bashful, Sleepy, Sneezy, and Dopey, who have returned home from working in a diamond mine. After learning about her story, they agree to let her stay. Meanwhile, the Queen learns from her Magic Mirror that Snow White is alive and imprisons the Huntsman before sending her guards to find the princess.

The next day, when a misunderstanding between the seven miners leaves the cottage a mess and Dopey humiliated, Snow White comforts him, teaching him how to whistle and motivating the others to tidy up their home. She crosses paths with Jonathan, who is wounded fending off the Queen's guards with his fellow bandits, and brings him to the cottage to be treated. The two realize their feelings for each other, and he agrees to help search for her missing father, but is captured and brought to the Queen, who imprisons him. Deducing Snow White's whereabouts, she transforms herself into an old peddler woman and creates a poisoned apple that will put whoever eats it into Sleeping Death and can only be broken by "true love's kiss".

The Queen finds Snow White alone at the cottage, while the animals see through her disguise and race to warn the miners. Manipulating her stepdaughter into taking a bite of the cursed apple, the Queen reveals that she had the king killed and leaves just as the miners return to find Snow White in a death-like sleep, laying her to rest in the forest. With the Huntsman's help, Jonathan escapes the dungeon and reaches the lifeless Snow White. He mournfully kisses her, and she awakens, rallying her friends to overthrow the Queen.

Leading her citizens to the palace, Snow White confronts her stepmother, who conjures a diamond dagger and goads her to take the throne by force. She refuses, and the Queen orders the guards to kill her, but Snow White reminds them of their former peaceful lives. Moved, the guards join the bandits, miners, and citizens in defending Snow White from the Queen, who flees to her Magic Mirror. Snow White follows, as the Mirror declares that her kindness and inner beauty make her the fairest. Angrily destroying the Mirror, the Queen is shattered by her own dark magic, and disappears as the Magic Mirror repairs itself. Snow White is named the new queen with Jonathan at her side as the kingdom celebrates.

== Cast ==
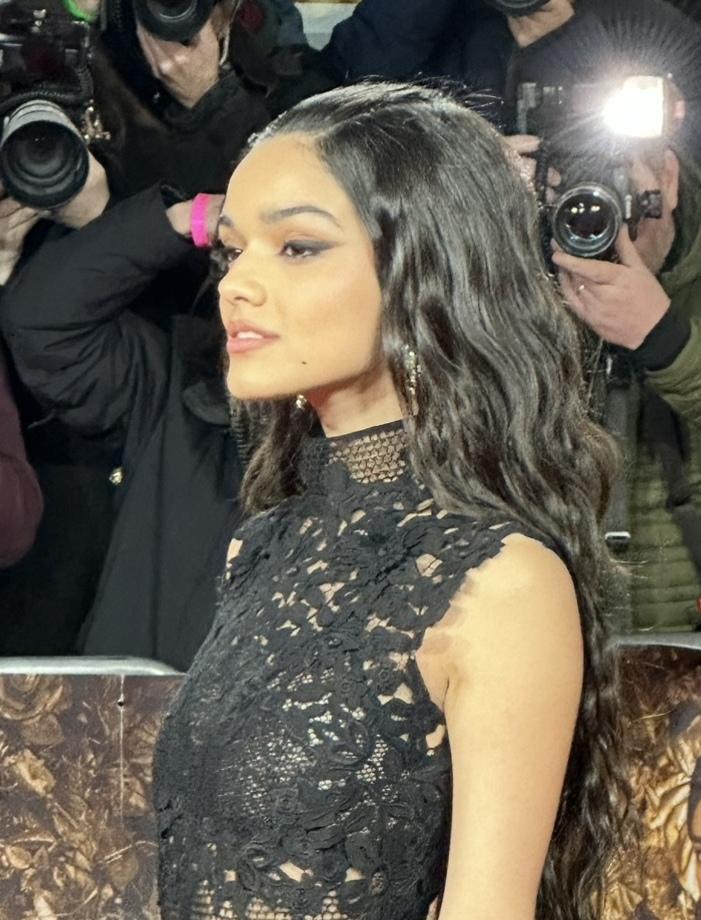
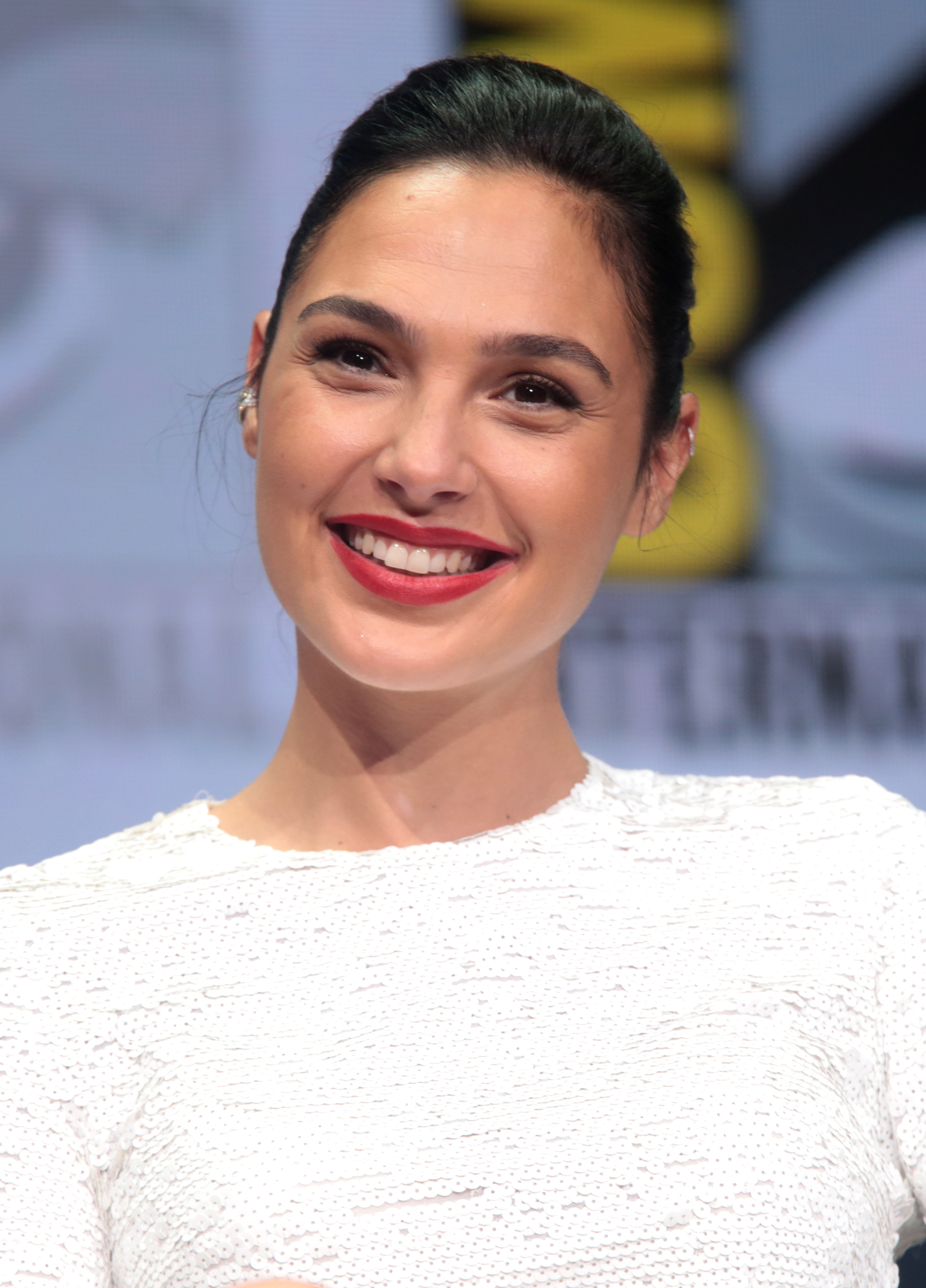
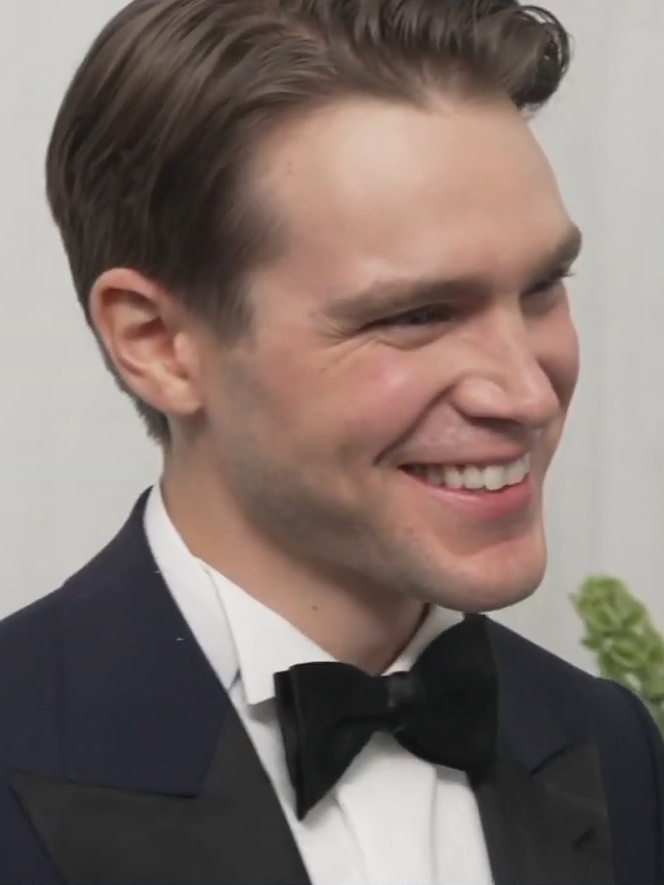
The film stars Rachel Zegler, Gal Gadot and Andrew Burnap.
- Rachel Zegler as Snow White, a fearless, kind and pure-hearted princess who is determined to free her kingdom from her stepmother's evil tyranny.
  - Emilia Faucher as young Snow White
  - Olivia Verrall as baby Snow White
- Gal Gadot as the Evil Queen, Snow White's vain, jealous, and tyrannical stepmother who is obsessed with being the fairest one of all.
- Andrew Burnap as Jonathan, a new character created as Snow White's love interest (partially based on the Prince from the original film) and a rebel who wants to defy the Evil Queen's monarchy.
- Jeremy Swift as the voice and facial capture of Doc, the intelligent leader of the seven magical beings of the forest.
- Martin Klebba as the voice and facial capture of Grumpy, a grouchy magical being of the forest.
- George Salazar as the voice and facial capture of Happy, a cheerful magical being of the forest.
- Tituss Burgess as the voice and facial capture of Bashful, a shy magical being of the forest.
- Andy Grotelueschen as the voice and facial capture of Sleepy, a drowsy magical being of the forest.
- Jason Kravits as the voice and facial capture of Sneezy, a magical being of the forest who sneezes frequently.
- Andrew Barth Feldman as the voice and facial capture of Dopey, a magical being of the forest who doesn't speak but makes other sounds until after Jonathan wakes Snow White from her Sleeping Death. He is ultimately revealed as the narrator.
- Patrick Page as the voice and facial motion-capture of the Magic Mirror, a mirror containing a being that truthfully answers the Evil Queen's question of who is the fairest one of all.
- Ansu Kabia as the Huntsman, an unnamed hunter and the Evil Queen's servant whom she orders to kill Snow White.

Additionally, Hadley Fraser and Lorena Andrea appear as the Good King and the Good Queen (with Krystina Alabado providing the singing voice for the Queen), Snow White's parents. Appearing as Jonathan's team of seven bandits are George Appleby as Quigg who is a "master of the crossbow", Colin Michael Carmichael as Farno, Samuel Baxter as Scythe, Jimmy Johnston as Finch, Dujonna Gift as Maple who is Quigg's love interest, Idriss Kargbo as Bingley, and Jaih Betote as Norwich.

Cast members appearing in minor roles include Anna Sylvester as Guard Paul's Wife, Jon-Scott Clark as Dancer, Dean Nolan, Jonathan Bourne, and Luisa Guerreiro as artisans, Daniel Boyarsky as Guard, Leo Cropley, Kieron Bell, and Vivienne Rowe as village children, Alejandro De Mesa as Competent Servant, John Hyatt as Guard Matthew's Father, and Victoria Alsina as Little Girl Lily. The royal guards consist of Adrian Bower as the captain of the guards, Felipe Bejarano as Guard Paul who used to work as a farmer that also grew cherry trees, Simeon Oakes as Guard Matthew who used to work as a baker, Joshmaine Joseph as Guard William, and Chike Chan as Guard Arthur.

== Production ==
=== Development ===
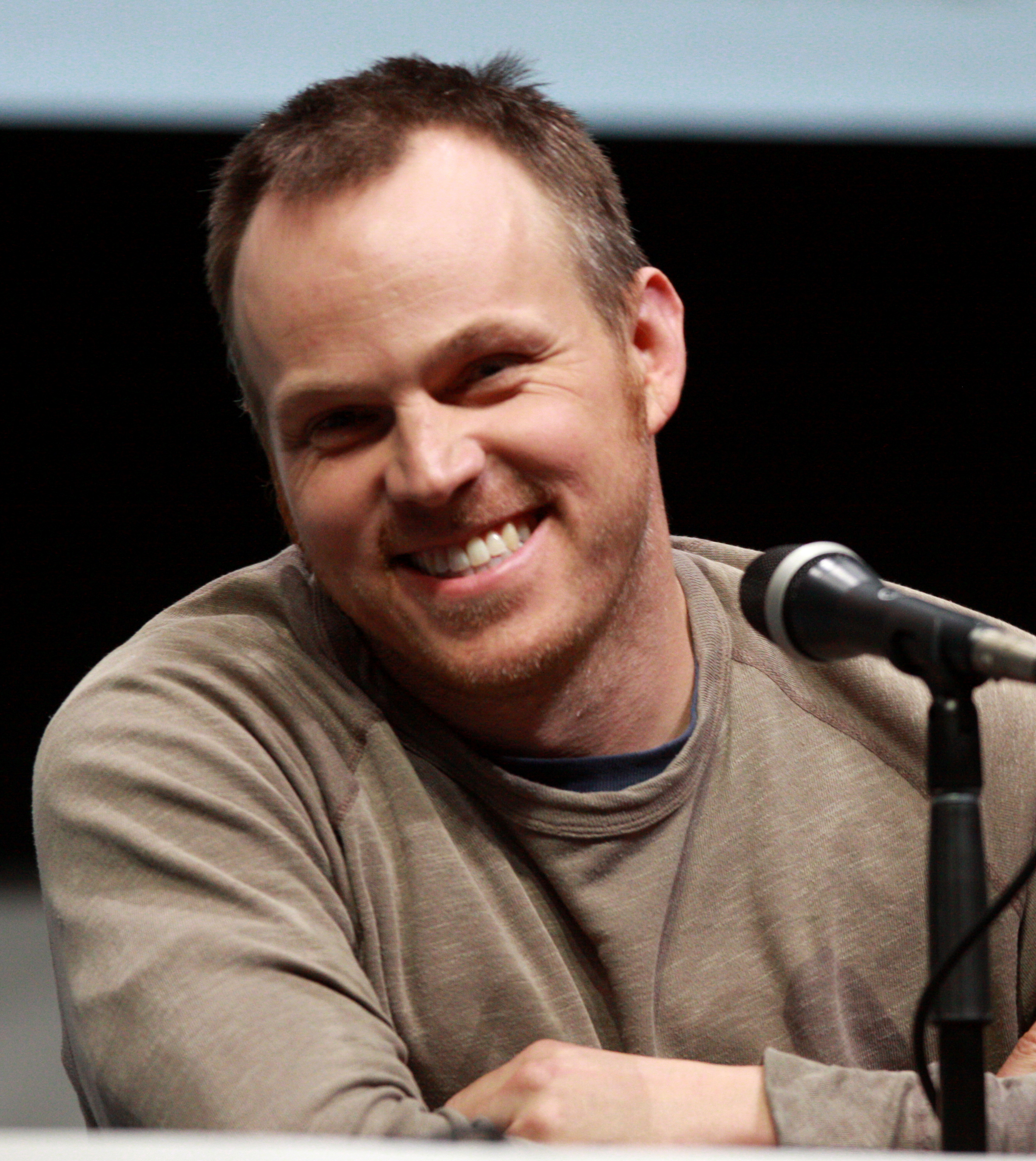
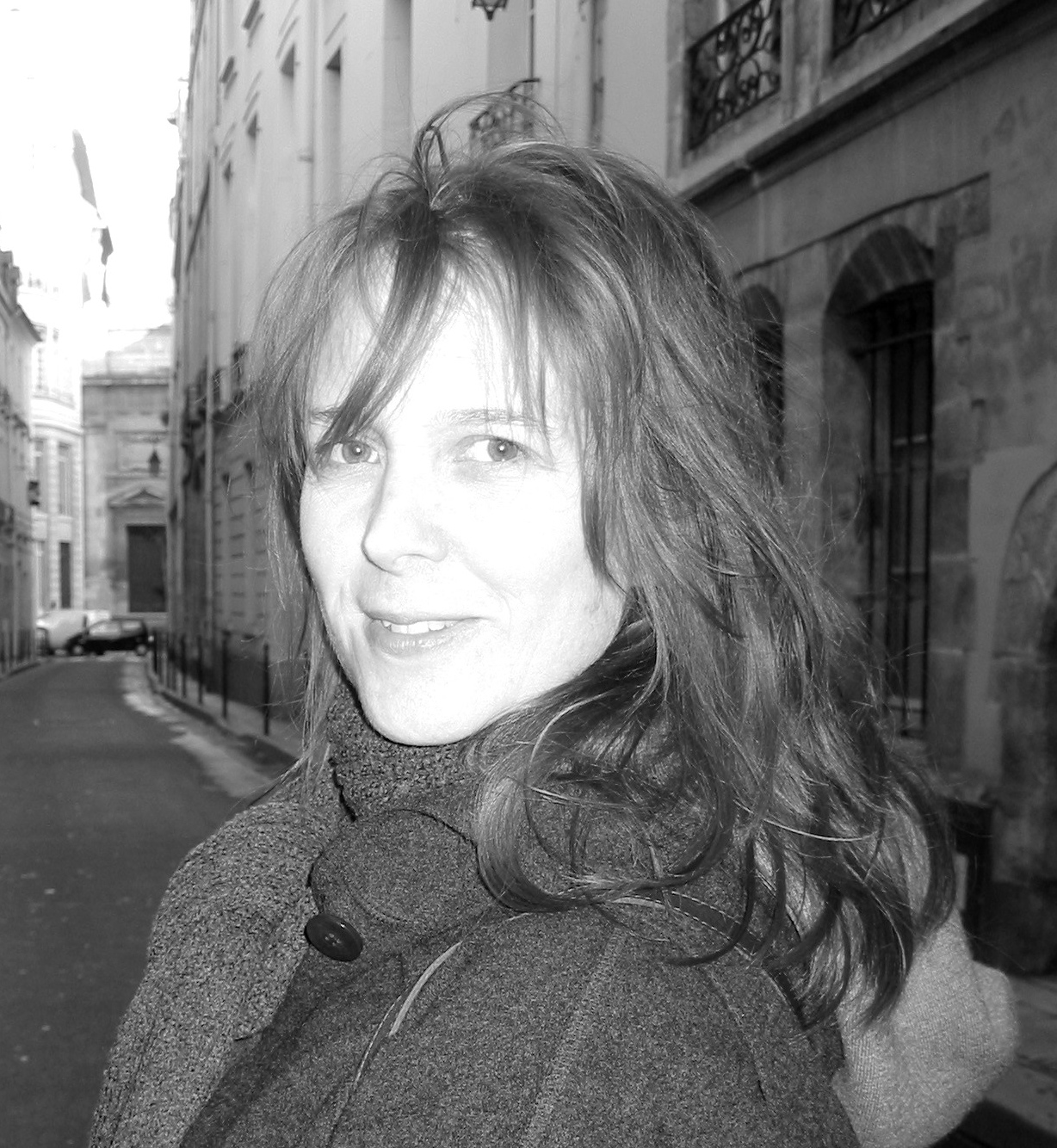
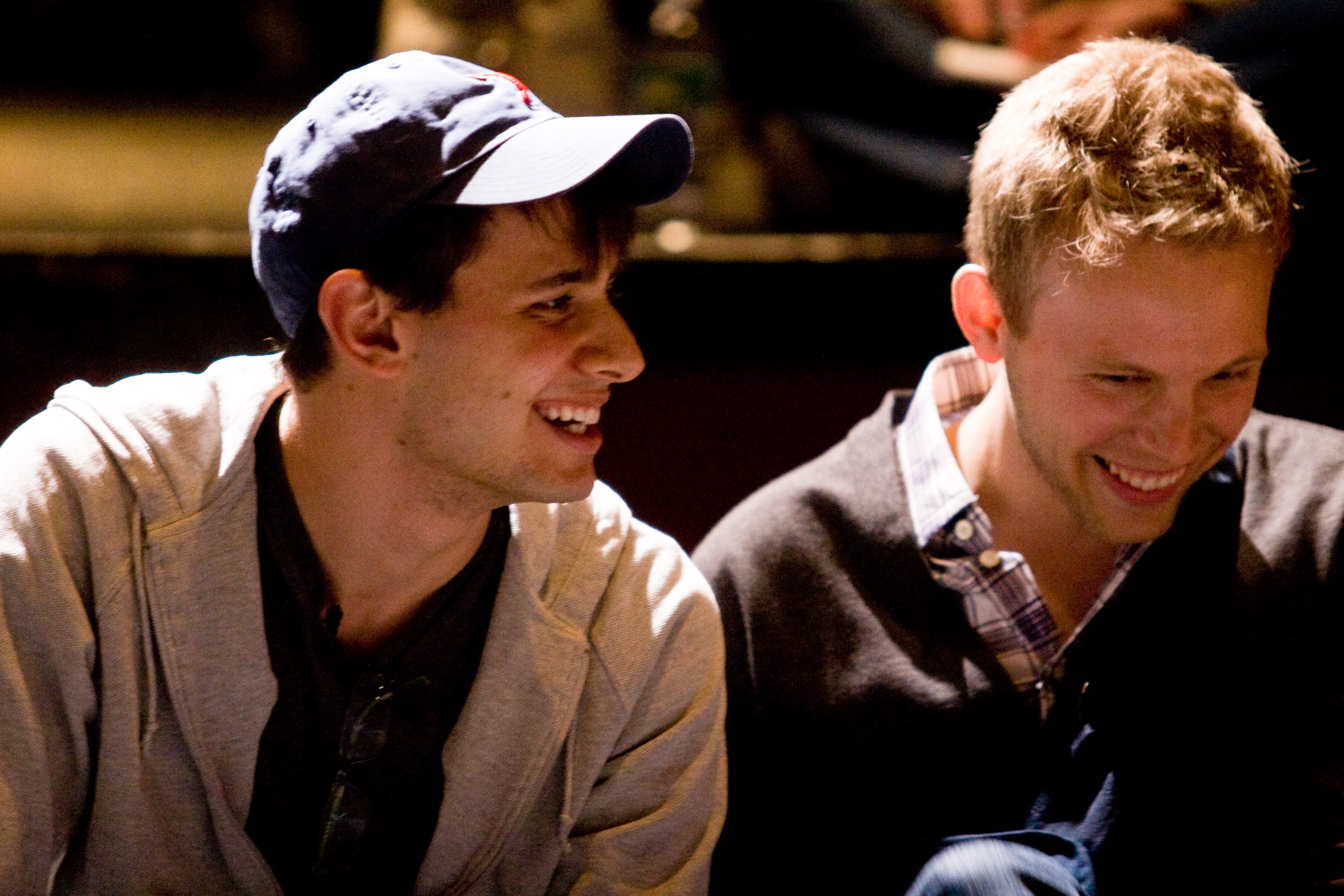
Director Marc Webb, screenwriter Erin Cressida Wilson and songwriters Benj Pasek and Justin Paul

On October 31, 2016, The Hollywood Reporter reported that Walt Disney Pictures was developing a live-action remake of Snow White and the Seven Dwarfs, with Marc Platt, an avid fan of the original film, signed on as lead producer and Erin Cressida Wilson being in talks to write the screenplay. Callum McDougall, in his third producing collaboration with Disney and Platt, serves as an executive producer.

On May 30, 2019, it was reported that Marc Webb was in talks to direct. In November 2021, Greta Gerwig was reported to be co-writing the screenplay. Wilson ultimately received sole credit for the screenplay; Gerwig, Jez Butterworth, Steven Levenson, Jeff Nathanson, Victoria Strouse and Chris Weitz each received an "additional literary material" credit from the Writers Guild of America, although they are not credited in the film itself.

=== Casting ===
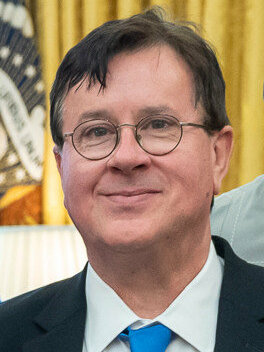
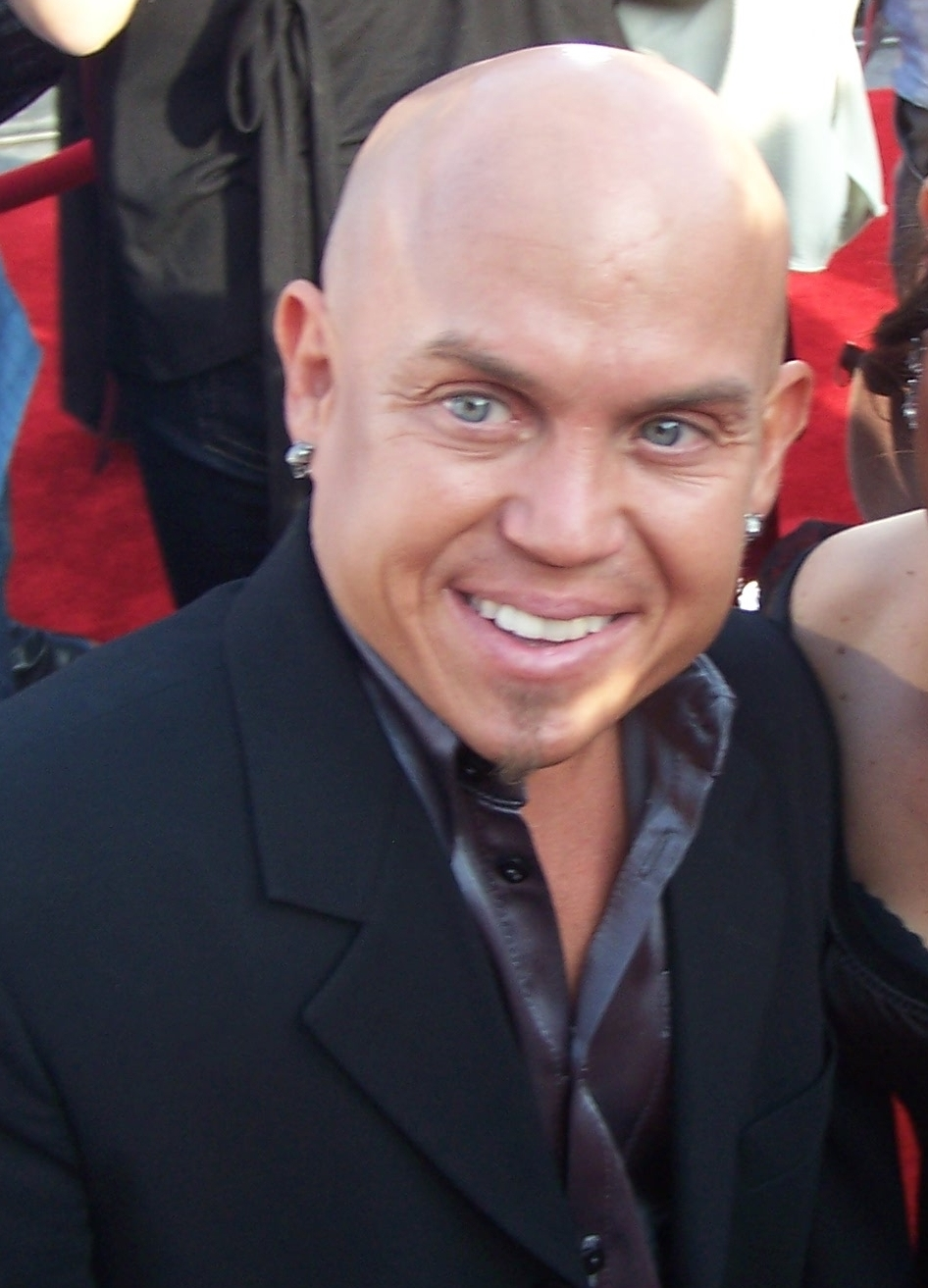
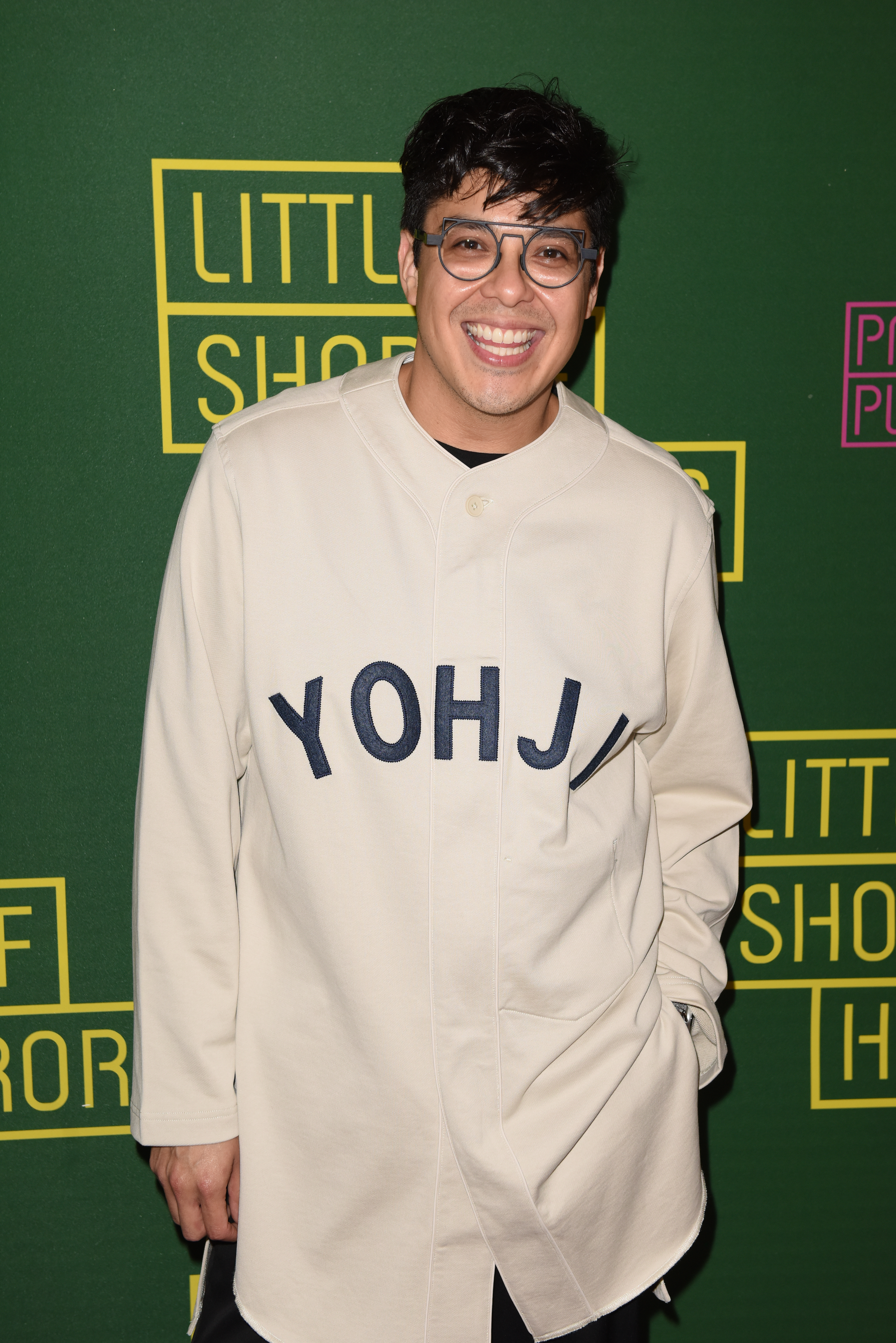
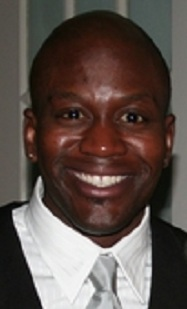
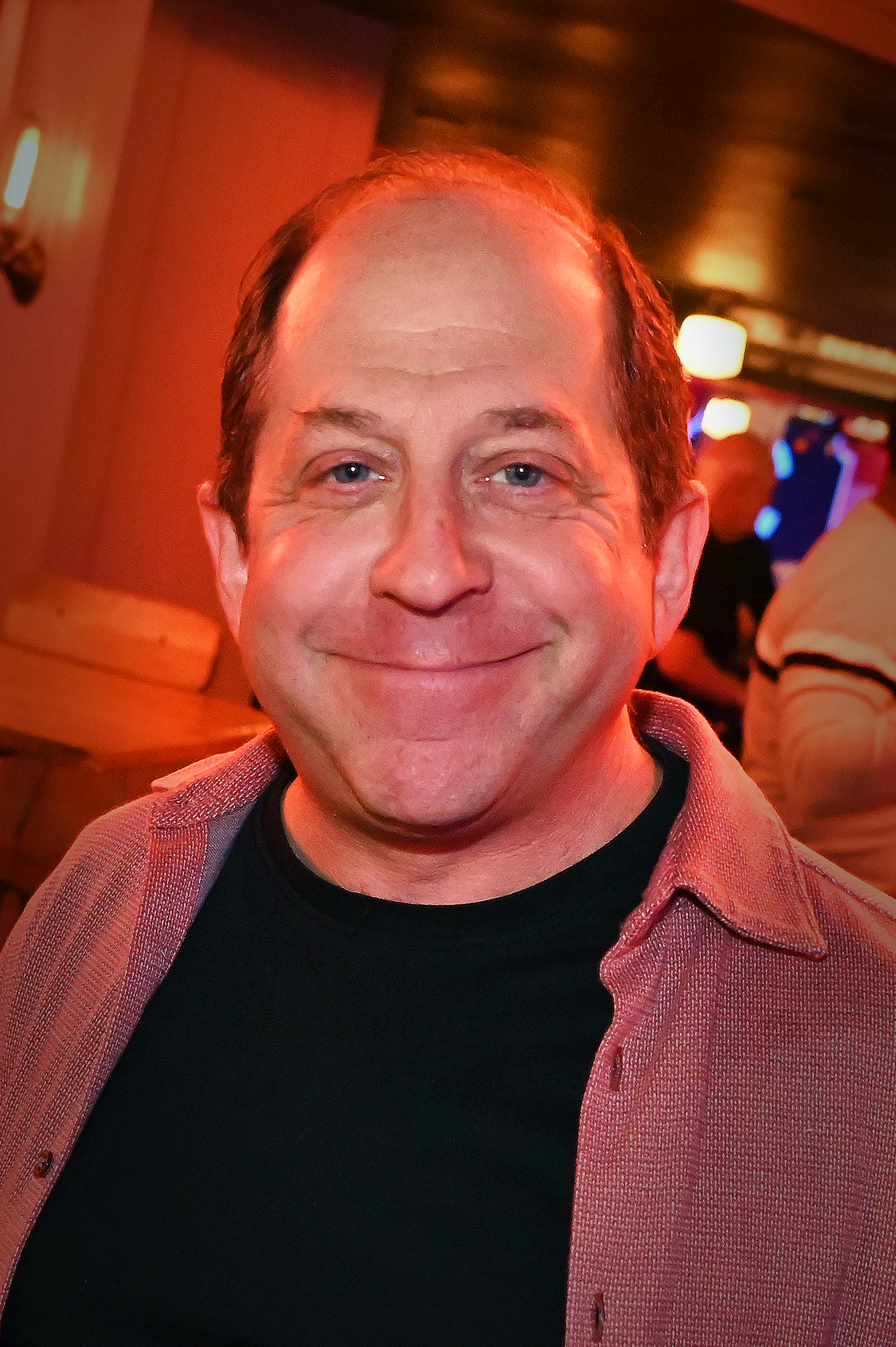
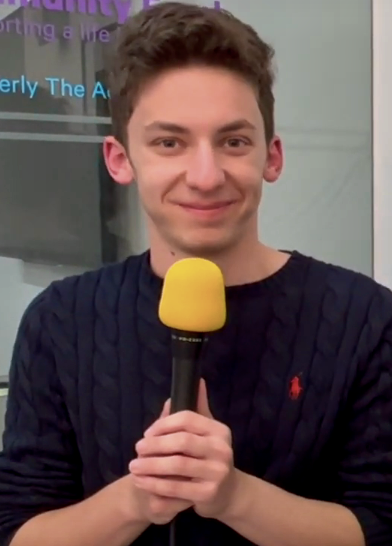
Jeremy Swift, Martin Klebba, George Salazar, Tituss Burgess, Jason Kravits and Andrew Barth Feldman provide the voices for six of the seven miners.

In June 2021, Rachel Zegler was cast in the title role. The casting of an actress of Latina descent as Snow White, who is described in the original Grimm fairy tale as having skin "as white as snow", was met with criticism from some quarters. Zegler responded to the criticism in January 2022, stating that Snow White is popular in Spanish-speaking countries and that casting a Latina actress in the role was significant due to its rarity. Zegler's casting was solidified through a "glowing recommendation" to Webb from Steven Spielberg, who directed Zegler as María in his 2021 film adaptation of West Side Story.

In November 2021, Gal Gadot was cast as the Evil Queen. A new casting search for an actress to star as a younger version of Snow White was launched and Emilia Faucher was cast. On January 12, 2022, Andrew Burnap was cast as a new character named Jonathan in the lead male role, replacing the character of The Prince. At the 2022 Denver Fan Expo, Martin Klebba revealed that he would be portraying Grumpy; Klebba previously played similar dwarf roles in earlier productions based on the "Snow White" fairy tale: in the 2001 made-for-television film Snow White: The Fairest of Them All as Friday, and in the 2012 fantasy comedy Mirror Mirror as Butcher. Colin Michael Carmichael was confirmed to appear as Farno, one of the bandits. Andrew Barth Feldman, Tituss Burgess, Jason Kravits, George Salazar, Jeremy Swift, and Andy Grotelueschen were all cast as the remaining members of the Seven Dwarfs, with Salazar and Grotelueschen both making their film debuts. David Krumholtz auditioned for Grumpy and Sleepy.

=== Writing ===
In October 2024, Zegler explained that the film would feature an altered origin for Snow White's name, with the character being named as an homage to the weather on the night of her birth, after surviving a snowstorm with her parents, a narrative element she stated was inspired by a previous adaptation of the fairy tale. She also faced criticism for comments about modernizing the titular character, particularly regarding the prince's role. At D23 Expo 2022, she stated:

The original cartoon came out in 1937 and very evidently so. There's a big focus on her love story with a guy who literally stalks her. Weird! Weird. So we didn't do that this time. We have a different approach to what I'm sure a lot of people will assume is a love story just because we cast a guy in the movie, Andrew Burnap, great dude. […] But it's really not about her love story at all, which is really, really wonderful. […] All of Andrew's scenes could get cut, who knows? It's Hollywood, baby!

Some criticized these changes as overly feminist, while others accused Zegler of misrepresenting feminism. David Hale Hand, son of the original film's co-director David Hand, called the remake "insulting". The controversy prompted The Daily Wire to announce a competing adaptation titled Snow White and the Evil Queen for their then-newly-launched kids‑streaming platform Bentkey, though it was later scrapped after star Brett Cooper's 2024 departure from the company. Zegler later clarified that the film would still include a love story, expressing sadness that her comments were misunderstood.

In January 2022, actor Peter Dinklage, who has a form of dwarfism, criticised the film for remaking a "backwards story about seven dwarfs living in a cave together". Disney responded that "to avoid reinforcing stereotypes from the original animated film," they were "taking a different approach with these seven characters and have been consulting with members of the dwarfism community." Dinklage's comments drew mixed reactions from other actors with dwarfism, including Jeff Brooks, Katrina Kemp, and Dylan Postl, who felt Dinklage may have been denying roles to people with dwarfism.

Photos published by the Daily Mail in July 2023 led to speculation that the dwarfs had been reimagined as one actor with dwarfism and six non-dwarf actors of diverse backgrounds. Disney initially called the photos fake, then said that while they did come from production, they were unofficial. These rumoured changes were criticised as overly politically correct and reducing opportunities for dwarf actors. Jason "Wee Man" Acuña of Jackass criticized Disney, asking "why are you hiring 'Snow White and the seven average people?'" The actors in the photos appear to have featured in the film as the seven bandits, rather than as dwarfs.

The final film features seven CGI characters resembling the 1937 dwarfs, though they are never called "dwarfs" in the film. It also avoids Snow White being relegated to the dwarfs' maid; upon arriving at the cottage, she falls asleep, and the dwarfs agree to let her stay for her safety. During the musical number "Whistle While You Work", all the characters share in cleaning up the home.

In addition, other traditional plot points are also reimagined: the huntsman spares Snow White's life and, instead of placing an animal heart in a box as in the original, uses an apple, eliminating the need for animal death while preserving the deception. The film also reframes Snow White's identity; her destiny is to be a fair and fearless leader, and the classic song "Someday My Prince Will Come" is replaced with "Waiting On A Wish," a solo about her "hope to become her father's daughter and the kind leader she was raised to be." Prince Charming is also replaced by Jonathan, a bandit leader, whose relationship with Snow White evolves from mutual skepticism to earned respect and love.

=== Filming ===
Filming took place in London, England from March to July 2022.

A fire damaged the production set on March 15 at Pinewood Studios; the stage was under construction when a tree caught fire according to a worker, leading to the blaze. A source from Disney confirmed that "no filming was underway". The shooting schedule was also reconfigured for Zegler to travel to Los Angeles to present at the 94th Academy Awards ceremony on March 27, in support of her West Side Story colleagues. While Zegler was attending the ceremony, Gadot began filming her scenes. Unlike in the original, her character sings and dances. On April 22, Gadot confirmed that she had completed filming her scenes, much later adding that she enjoyed playing the role of the first Disney villain and that she was able to make a more dramatic role by changing her voice due to the film being a musical. On July 13, Zegler revealed that filming had wrapped. Mandy Moore, known for her work on La La Land, choreographed the musical sequences.

Disney was unsatisfied with the film's original cut and ordered reshoots, which took place in June 2024. The resulting cut of the film replaced some of the originally intended ending with a new scene involving the Evil Queen and the Magic Mirror. The track "Snow White Returns" was also a late addition to the film. Much of the plotline involving the bandits was excised, as was a song titled "Hidden in My Heart", which was described by The New York Times as a "second-act…tear-jerker sung by one of the miners." Visual effects for the film were provided by Moving Picture Company, Framestore, Day For Nite, Passion Pictures, Vitality Visual Effects, Cheap Shot VFX, Lola Visual Effects, and Crafty Apes.

=== Costumes ===
Sandy Powell, who previously designed the costumes for Disney's 2015 remake of Cinderella and Mary Poppins Returns, was in charge of the costumes for the film. Powell started developing the film's costumes approximately four months before filming began, and the design and construction process continued throughout the five-month production. A team of approximately one hundred fifteen people worked on creating more than one thousand costumes.

For Snow White, Powell said that she decided to remain faithful to the visual identity of the original Snow White while adapting it for the film's aspects, explaining that the design retained the character's well-known color palette but introduced subtle changes to create a more realistic and period-appropriate appearance. She stated, "[She] knew [she] couldn't deviate too far from the iconic color palette of the original Snow White but wanted to create a new version nonetheless." While Snow White's main costume retained its blue bodice with puffed sleeves, it also included a removable blue overskirt that tore away during a forest escape sequence, revealing a yellow skirt made from specially dyed silk beneath and forming a silhouette similar to the animated character. The costume also added long sleeves to its bodice to give it "a more period feel reminiscent of the Middle Ages." In an interview with Hello!, Powell explained that she intentionally kept the character's look recognizable because of the cultural importance of the original Disney design. She said, "Everybody knows what Snow White looks like, so there was no way [she] could change it. [She] just did a different version." She also noted that the character's iconic red headband was removed early in the film to reflect Snow White's growth throughout the film because she felt it appeared "too childlike."

For the Evil Queen, Powell took inspiration from the glamorous evening gowns of the 1930s Golden Age of Hollywood. She explained in an interview with People that the character's wardrobe was designed to reflect "glamour and sophistication and yet be intimidating." The costumes featured sleek silhouettes and luxurious materials such as sequins, velvet, and richly colored fabrics. According to Powell, the designs were intended to evoke the figure-hugging, bias-cut gowns worn by classic Hollywood stars while still maintaining a shape reminiscent of medieval fashion. The character's color palette progressed through darker tones to convey a sense of authority and intimidation. Powell also explained that the outfit "had to have a clean silhouette without too much detail to showcase the jewels she accumulates," adding that the crown was inspired by stained-glass windows and the colors of the character's gemstones. The Evil Queen's iconic outfit from the 1937 original film, which was only worn during the musical sequence "All Is Fair", reportedly took 159 days to complete with a team of artisans working on its design. Powell noted that the character's wardrobe was meant to project the image of someone "imposing" and impeccably dressed.

== Music ==
Songwriters Benj Pasek and Justin Paul, who previously wrote the lyrics for two new songs for Disney's 2019 remake of Aladdin, wrote new songs alongside Jack Feldman as additional lyricist, including a new "I Want" song for Snow White, titled "Waiting on a Wish". They also wrote a new "villain song" for the Evil Queen, titled "All Is Fair", a new love duet for Snow White and Jonathan titled "A Hand Meets a Hand" (written in collaboration with Lizzy McAlpine), and a new opening ensemble number titled "Good Things Grow". The film features four of the eight songs from the original film by Frank Churchill and Larry Morey: "Heigh-Ho", "Whistle While You Work", "The Silly Song" and "Someday My Prince Will Come", the last of which is heard instrumentally. In January 2025, it was revealed that Jeff Morrow had composed the score. Dave Metzger, a frequent collaborator on the music for films made by Walt Disney Animation Studios, served as orchestrator for the songs. Christophe Beck, who also worked on several Disney projects (both animated and live-action) and for whom Morrow served as a protégé, served as score consultant. On March 4, 2025, it was announced that the soundtrack album would be released on March 14 by Walt Disney Records, with "Waiting on a Wish" released to the public that same day as the lead single. A deluxe edition of the album was released on March 20, 2025, featuring instrumental versions of the songs and Morrow's underscore.

== Marketing ==
On September 9, 2022, during Disney's 2022 D23 Expo presentation, a 30-second first-look trailer as well as first-look images were previewed. There were quick flashes of several major settings, including Snow White's cottage in the woods, the intricately designed interior of the Queen's castle, and the moss-covered forest. There were also short glimpses of Gadot as the Evil Queen questioning her magic mirror, Zegler as Snow White, and Snow White's hand falling with the poisoned apple toppling along with her. Gadot said about her role that playing the Evil Queen was "very different than what [she] had done before. [She is] used to playing the other end of where the heart should be", but she found it very "delightful" to "get under her skin". The title logo was also revealed.

On October 27, 2023, Disney released the official first image of the film with Zegler as Snow White as well as Bashful, Doc, Dopey, Grumpy, Happy, Sleepy, and Sneezy. Zegler confirmed that there is a lot of CGI, which made her feel "nervous". Footage of Gadot as the Evil Queen was shown at the 2024 CinemaCon. Disney presented new footage and a behind-the-scenes look during the 2024 CineEurope. The 2024 D23 Expo presented a sneak preview with a clip of the musical number "Whistle While You Work" along with the first trailer.

The trailer for Snow White was released on YouTube in August 2024 and became the most disliked film trailer on the platform, garnering an estimated nearly one million dislikes and over 82,000 likes within three weeks, according to available data from browser extensions that display an approximation of YouTube dislikes.

The first full trailer debuted at D23 Brazil in November 2024 before eventually being released onto YouTube on December 3, 2024. Stuart Heritage of The Guardian criticized the visual effects for the animals and dwarves. He said the dwarves "look like someone has snuck into Disneyland, grabbed the statues from Snow White's Enchanted Wish and wrapped them in human flesh, as a serial killer would with a gift for their mother" and "like someone has shaved the Sonic the Hedgehog from that first Sonic the Hedgehog trailer that everyone hated." Polygon's Petrana Radulovic wrote, "The new Snow White looks like it's putting in more of a plot, likely one where our plucky heroine will stand up to her despotic tyrant of a stepmother in a YA dystopian plotline out of 2014. Maybe it'll work, storywise! Visually, though, everything seems like it's working on the same budget as ABC Family's Once Upon a Time." An international trailer featuring Snow White's origins was released on December 19, 2024. A featurette showing a behind-the-scenes look and how it would honor the legacy of the 1937 film was released on February 20, 2025. The press tour began in Tokyo on March 5, 2025, with Zegler joining her Japanese dub counterpart Sakura Kiryu to perform "Waiting on a Wish" live for the first time. On March 10, 2025, the day tickets for the film went on sale, Disney released new posters, a TV spot, and a film clip. Zegler later appeared on the March 17, 2025 episode of Jimmy Kimmel Live! to give the first live television performance of "Waiting on a Wish".

At least $70 million was spent on marketing, which, combined with the main production budget, gave Disney a total investment of $350 million for the film.

=== Printed adaptations ===
A tie-in novelization of the film written by Elizabeth Rudnick, and an original novel written by Lauren Blackwood and illustrated by Serena Malyon titled Snow White: Fair & Sinister Heart were both published by Disney Publishing Worldwide on March 25, 2025. The original novel takes place after Snow White eats the poisoned apple and falls into an enchanted sleep, sending her consciousness into the dangerous, gem-filled dream world of Diamant, where she must find the Ruby Heart to save herself and her kingdom.

== Release ==
=== Theatrical ===
During the 2022 D23 Expo Presentation, it was announced that Snow White would be released in 2024. On September 15, 2022, the film was announced to have a release date of March 22, 2024. However, in October 2023, it was delayed a year to March 21, 2025, with the 2023 SAG-AFTRA strike cited as the rationale for the delay. The theatrical release included engagements in IMAX, Dolby Cinema, 4DX, ScreenX and D-BOX.

The European premiere took place on March 12, 2025, at Spain's Alcázar of Segovia, which inspired the castle in the original film, to give the film a more elaborate showing at a "fairytale" venue. A Hollywood premiere without regular red-carpet press took place at the El Capitan Theatre on March 15, 2025, due to the controversies surrounding Zegler and Gadot's political views. In Gadot's honor, the film's first premiere in Israel took place on March 19, 2025, at the Planet Cinema in Rishon LeZion, with prominent figures from Israel attending.

The film was re-released in 1,000 theatres in the United States on May 9, 2025, during the Mother's Day weekend, making $335,000.

=== Home media ===
Snow White was released for digital download on May 13, 2025, and on Ultra HD Blu-ray, Blu-ray, and DVD on June 24. The home media releases include deleted scenes, a gag reel, and featurettes. A special two-movie collection of the film and the animated movie, Snow White and the Seven Dwarfs, was also released. Snow White was released on the streaming service Disney+ on June 11, 2025.

In the United States, Snow White debuted at No. 2 on Fandango at Home's top 10 digital sales and rental chart for the week ending May 18, shortly after its May 13 release for premium digital rental and purchase. the film later ranked No. 5 on the same chart for the week ending May 25, and later placed No. 8 for the week ending June 1. Snow White ranked No. 4 on the overall disc sales chart for the week ended July 5, with 62% of its unit sales from DVD, 36% from Blu-ray, and 2% from 4K Ultra HD. It placed No. 7 on the Blu-ray chart, according to Circana's VideoScan chart. In the United Kingdom, Snow White ranked No. 6 on the U.K. Official Film Chart for the week ending May 28. The film subsequently ranked No. 8 for the week ending June 4.

Streaming analytics firm FlixPatrol, which monitors daily updated VOD charts and streaming ratings across the globe, reported that Snow White became the most-streamed film on Disney+ in the U.S. following its release on the platform. Analytics company Samba TV, which gathers viewership data from certain smart TVs and content providers, reported that the film experienced a 405% spike in viewership over its first five days on Disney+ following its streaming debut, compared to its performance during the PVOD release. Nielsen Media Research, which records streaming viewership on certain American television screens, calculated that Snow White was streamed for 581 million minutes from June 9–15, making it the fifth most-streamed film that week. In the following week, June 16–22, Snow White was streamed for 284 million minutes, ranking as the sixth most-streamed film. During the week of June 23–29, Snow White placed eighth with 161 million minutes viewed.

== Reception ==
=== Box office ===
Snow White grossed $87.2 million in the United States and Canada, and $118.5 million in other territories for a worldwide total of $205.7 million. Deadline Hollywood estimated the film would lose Disney around $115 million.

In the United States and Canada, Snow White was released alongside The Alto Knights and Ash, and was projected to gross $45–55 million from 4,200 theaters in its opening weekend. It was initially projected to gross $63–70 million, with analysts comparing this projection to the $69.4 million opening of Maleficent (2014) and believing that the film would overcome its controversies and fare well financially, given there being no strong competition against it on opening weekend, but in late February, projections were lowered. The film made $16 million on its first day, including an estimated $3.5 million in Thursday previews. It went on to debut to $42.2 million, slightly below projections but still managing to top the box office due to little competition; the low opening was attributed by The Hollywood Reporter to "so-so audience scores and underwhelming reviews". Business Insider reported that the film's behind-the-scenes controversies likely had little impact on its box-office performance, while Deadline reported that the film's financial performance could primarily be attributed to its marketing, the source material failing to resonate with younger audiences, and negative buzz surrounding the film's visuals. In its second weekend, the film made $14.3 million (dropping 66%), finishing second behind newcomer A Working Man, and then $6.1 million in its third weekend, falling to fourth.

Producer Marc Platt's son Jonah Platt attributed Snow White's underperformance in its opening week partly to Zegler's social media post supporting Palestine. Box-office analysts largely disagreed with the view that the film's underperformance could be attributed to political controversies and instead attributed it to the film's failure to resonate with critics and audiences. Some actors and musicians have defended Zegler's comments.

=== Critical response ===
The film received mixed reviews. On the review aggregator website Rotten Tomatoes, 39% of 277 critics' reviews are positive, with an average rating of 5.1/10; the consensus reads: "Snow White is hardly a grumpy time at the movies thanks to Rachel Zegler's luminous star turn, but its bashful treatment of the source material along with some dopey stylistic choices won't make everyone happy, either." Metacritic, which uses a weighted average, assigned the film a score of 50 out of 100, based on 51 critics, indicating "mixed or average" reviews. Audiences polled by CinemaScore gave the film an average grade of "B+" on an A+ to F scale, while those surveyed by PostTrak gave it an average rating of three out of five stars, with 43% saying they would definitely recommend it. The Hollywood Reporter noted that Disney's previous theatrical remakes earned CinemaScores around the "A" range. The BBC reported that British film critics have mostly panned the film, while US critics were more positive.

At best, reviews from Entertainment Weekly and IGN considered Snow White one of the best Disney live-action remakes. Lukewarmly, Nell Minow of RogerEbert.com concluded it was only "fair", with "none of it has the sweetness and imagination of the animated feature". At worst, Rolling Stone called it the blandest and the New York Post "awkward" and instantly forgettable. Nicholas Barber of the BBC recommended watching the film as an "identity crisis" in tone, pacing and storytelling.

In general, critics praised Zegler's performance but were not as favorable towards Gadot and the computer-animated dwarfs. Katcy Stephan of Variety lauded Zegler as a "shining supernova" and her character as having "newfound depth through her fervent desire to become the leader her father believed she could be." Pete Hammond of Deadline Hollywood praised Zegler as "ideal in [her] lead role" and "terrific". Daniel Bayer of AwardsWatch wrote, "[Marc] Webb gets the job done with minimal muss and fuss, and whenever Zegler is onscreen, the film manages to conjure up some of that good old Disney magic."

Reviewers heavily discussed, and mostly appreciated, the film's modernization and expansion of themes of the source material. Critics like Dan Rubins of Slant found the modernization typical of remakes at the time, with David Rooney of The Hollywood Reporter noting its female-empowerment formula being typical in modern fairy-tale films. However, Witney Seibold of /Film wrote the film "seems to have thoughts in its head" despite its surface-level writing. Amy Nicholson of the Los Angeles Times described as "a fascinating case study" of the "impossible contradictions" of turbulent contemporary times. Peter Bradshaw of The Guardian was in the minority, hating the film's "tiresome pseudo-progressive additions".

=== Accolades ===
Award	Date of ceremony	Category	Recipient	Result	Ref.
The Queerties	March 11, 2025	Next Big Thing	Snow White	Nominated	
Chita Rivera Awards for Dance and Choreography	May 19, 2025	Outstanding Choreography in a Feature Film	Mandy Moore	Nominated	
Golden Trailer Awards	May 29, 2025	Best Animation/Family	Snow White: "Slay"	Nominated	
Golden Raspberry Awards	March 14, 2026	Worst Picture	Disney's Snow White	Nominated	
Golden Raspberry Awards	March 14, 2026	Worst Remake, Rip-off or Sequel	Snow White	Nominated	
Golden Raspberry Awards	March 14, 2026	Worst Supporting Actor	All Seven Artificial Dwarfs	Won	
Golden Raspberry Awards	March 14, 2026	Worst Screen Combo	All Seven Dwarfs	Won	
Golden Raspberry Awards	March 14, 2026	Worst Director	Marc Webb	Nominated	
Golden Raspberry Awards	March 14, 2026	Worst Screenplay	Erin Cressida Wilson (Note: Full nomination for "Erin Cressida Wilson and a bunch of others too numerous to mention. Drawing from the original fairy tale by the Brothers Grimm.")	Nominated	
National Film Awards UK	July 1, 2026	Best International Film	Snow White	Nominated	

=== Boycotts ===
In August 2024, after the trailer for Snow White premiered, Boycott, Divestment and Sanctions (BDS) and the Palestinian Campaign for the Academic and Cultural Boycott of Israel (PACBI) called for a boycott of the film due to Gadot's past service in the Israel Defense Forces (IDF) (Note: All Israeli Jews must legally serve in the IDF.) and pro-Israel stance. Boycott calls grew as Gadot and Zegler openly took opposing sides on the Israeli–Palestinian conflict, with Gadot supporting Israel and Zegler supporting Palestine. Before the film's release, Gadot received death threats, attributed to her stance, which led Disney to provide additional security for her. Despite their opposing views, Gadot and Zegler had a positive relationship with each other during the film's production.

Another call to boycott was made by Republican supporters in November 2024 following the U.S. presidential election, as Zegler posted "Fuck Donald Trump" and criticized those who voted to re-elect him, saying, "May Trump supporters and Trump voters and Trump himself never know peace." Zegler later issued a public apology, saying she did not intend any harm with her message.

In March 2025, several Arab organizations and individuals opposed to Israeli policies launched a digital campaign against the film, particularly targeting Gadot due to her past military service. Groups from Jordan, Kuwait, Bahrain, Tunisia, UAE, and Egypt, called for a regional boycott, arguing that screening the film supports the Israeli occupation and the IDF's treatment of Palestinians. Later in April, the film was officially banned in Lebanon, and it was pulled from theaters in Kuwait.

By April 2025, over 91% of reviews of Snow White on IMDb were one star, which led to the site flagging the film with a notice of unusual activity due to concerns of review bombing.

== See also ==
- List of films about witchcraft
- List of remakes and adaptations of Disney animated films
