= Saving Mr. Banks (soundtrack) =

Saving Mr. Banks (Original Motion Picture Soundtrack)

Soundtrack album by Thomas Newman
- Released: December 10, 2013
- Recorded: 2013
- Studio: Newman Scoring Stage (Los Angeles); Capitol (Hollywood)(non-score)
- Genre: Film score
- Length: 45:57; 1:09:18 (Deluxe edition)
- Label: Walt Disney
- Producer: Thomas Newman; Bill Bernstein

Thomas Newman chronology
Side Effects (2013)	Saving Mr. Banks (Original Motion Picture Soundtrack) (2013)	Get on Up (2014)

Saving Mr. Banks: Original Motion Picture Soundtrack is the soundtrack album of the 2013 drama film Saving Mr. Banks, written and composed by American film composer Thomas Newman.

The album features twenty-five tracks of Newman's score, as well as four re-recordings of songs written by Richard M. Sherman and Robert B. Sherman as performed by the film's cast, and two standalone songs ("One Mint Julep" and "Heigh-Ho"). Walt Disney Records released two editions of the soundtrack on December 10, 2013: a single-disc and a two-disc digipak deluxe edition, with the latter containing original demo recordings by the Sherman Brothers and selected songs from Mary Poppins.

Newman's score was critically lauded and received several accolade recognitions for Best Musical Score, including Academy Award, BAFTA, Grammy Award, and Critics' Choice Award nominations.

== Track listing ==
No.	Title	Writer(s)	Performer(s)	Length
1.	"Chim Chim Cher-ee (East Wind)"	Richard M. Sherman, Robert B. Sherman	Colin Farrell	1:04
2.	"Travers Goff"		Thomas Newman	2:06
3.	"Walking Bus"		Thomas Newman	2:10
4.	"One Mint Julep"	Rudy Toombs	Ray Charles	1:31
5.	"Uncle Albert"		Thomas Newman	1:34
6.	"Jollification"		Thomas Newman	1:18
7.	"The Mouse"		Thomas Newman	0:57
8.	"Leisurely Stroll"		Thomas Newman	1:34
9.	"Chim Chim Cher-ee (Responstible)"	Richard M. Sherman, Robert B. Sherman	Jason Schwartzman, B. J. Novak, and Emma Thompson	0:26
10.	"Mr. Disney"		Thomas Newman	0:35
11.	"Celtic Soul"		Thomas Newman	1:20
12.	"A Foul Fowl"		Thomas Newman	2:04
13.	"Mrs. P. L. Travers"		Thomas Newman	1:16
14.	"Laying Eggs"		Thomas Newman	1:08
15.	"Worn to Tissue"		Thomas Newman	0:54
16.	"Heigh-Ho"	Frank Churchill, Larry Morey	The Dave Brubeck Quartet	2:11
17.	"Whiskey"		Thomas Newman	1:21
18.	"Impertinent Man"		Thomas Newman	0:38
19.	"To My Mother"		Thomas Newman	3:44
20.	"Westerly Weather"		Thomas Newman	1:58
21.	"Supercalifragilisticexpialidocious"	Richard M. Sherman, Robert B. Sherman	Jason Schwartzman, B. J. Novak, and Emma Thompson	0:05
22.	"Spit Spot!"		Thomas Newman	1:49
23.	"Beverly Hills Hotel"		Thomas Newman	0:38
24.	"Penguins"		Thomas Newman	1:18
25.	"Pears"		Thomas Newman	0:55
26.	"Let's Go Fly a Kite"	Richard M. Sherman, Robert B. Sherman	Jason Schwartzman, B. J. Novak, Bradley Whitford, Melanie Paxson, and Emma Thompson	1:55
27.	"Maypole"		Thomas Newman	0:59
28.	"Forgiveness"		Thomas Newman	2:00
29.	"The Magic Kingdom"		Thomas Newman	1:05
30.	"Ginty My Love"		Thomas Newman	3:12
31.	"Saving Mr. Banks (End Title)"		Thomas Newman	2:12
Total length:				45:57

All tracks are written by Richard M. Sherman and Robert B. Sherman.

Saving Mr. Banks (Original Motion Picture Soundtrack – Two-Disc Deluxe Edition) (Disc 2)
No.	Title	Artist(s)	Length
1.	"The Pearly Song" (Demo)	Richard M. Sherman, Robert B. Sherman	1:30
2.	"Chim Chim Cher-ee" (Demo)	Richard M. Sherman, Robert B. Sherman	2:39
3.	"Tuppence a Bag" (Demo)	Richard M. Sherman	2:55
4.	"Let's Go Fly a Kite" (Demo)	Richard M. Sherman	1:44
5.	"A Spoonful of Sugar"	Julie Andrews	4:07
6.	"Supercalifragilisticexpialidocious"	Julie Andrews and Dick Van Dyke	2:02
7.	"Chim Chim Cher-ee"	Julie Andrews, Dick Van Dyke, Karen Dotrice, and Matthew Garber	2:46
8.	"Feed the Birds"	Julie Andrews	3:50
9.	"Let's Go Fly a Kite"	David Tomlinson, Dick Van Dyke, and the Londoners	1:48
Total length:			23:21

== Personnel ==
- Thomas Newman – conductor
- Michael Zainer – assistant music editor
- Bill Bernstein – music editor
- J.A.C Redford – orchestration
- Bill Bernstein – producer
- Matt Sullivan – music supervisor
- Leslie Morris – orchestra contractor
- Shinosuke Miyazawa – assistant engineer
- Mitchell Leib – executive in charge of music
- Scott Holtzman - music business affairs
- Sylvia Krask - music business affairs
- Steve Gerdes – art direction

== Reception ==
Professional ratings
Review scores
Source	Rating
AllMusic	5/5 stars
Filmtracks	4/5 stars

John Stanley of the San Francisco Chronicle positively compared Thomas Newman's music to the works of his father's [Alfred Newman]. Daniel Schweiger of Film Music Magazine, wrote that Newman's music was " a beautifully thematic, and anachronistically wondrous score".

=== Accolades ===
List of awards and nominations
Award	Date of ceremony	Category	Recipients and nominees	Result
Academy Awards	March 2, 2014	Best Original Score	Thomas Newman	Nominated
British Academy Film Awards	February 16, 2014	Best Film Music	Thomas Newman	Nominated
Broadcast Film Critics Association	January 16, 2014	Best Score	Thomas Newman	Nominated
Grammy Awards	February 8, 2015	Best Score Soundtrack for Visual Media	Thomas Newman	Nominated
Houston Film Critics Society	December 15, 2013	Best Original Score	Thomas Newman	Nominated
Phoenix Film Critics Society	December 17, 2013	Best Original Score	Thomas Newman	Nominated
St. Louis Gateway Film Critics Association	December 16, 2013	Best Musical Score	Thomas Newman	Nominated
Washington D.C. Area Film Critics Association	December 9, 2013	Best Score	Thomas Newman	Nominated
