= 2025 in United States politics and government =

Events in 2025 pertaining to politics and government in the United States.

== National politics ==
=== Presidency ===
President Joe Biden issued several executive orders and moved to enact multiple progressive policies in his final month as president, including banning new oil and gas drilling along most coasts and designating the Chuckwalla and Sáttítla Highlands National Monuments. He awarded the Presidential Medal of Freedom to eighteen individuals, primarily philanthropists, Democratic politicians, and donors. Several national crises occurred during Biden's final month, such as the 2025 New Orleans truck attack and the January 2025 Southern California wildfires. He continued to release prisoners from Guantanamo Bay Naval Base, leaving fifteen men by the time he will conclude office, though he asked a federal appellate court to block a plea deal entered by Khalid Sheikh Mohammed, one of the perpetrators of the September 11 attacks.

=== Congress ===
The 119th United States Congress began at 12 p.m. EST on January 3, 2025, following the adjournment of the 118th Congress. Leading up to an election to elect the speaker of the House, incumbent representative Mike Johnson of Louisiana's bid appeared uncertain amid opposition from the Freedom Caucus despite an endorsement from Trump. Johnson was re-elected after initially not receiving enough votes to be re-elected; Representatives Thomas Massie of Kentucky voted for Tom Emmer, while Keith Self of Texas and Ralph Norman of South Carolina voted for other representatives until the two switched their votes for Johnson.

=== Supreme Court ===
The Supreme Court is set to hear several cases, including TikTok v. Garland.

== Events ==
=== January ===
- January 3:
  - The 119th United States Congress begins. John Thune becomes the Senate Majority Leader, while Mike Johnson is re-elected as speaker of the House.
  - Judge Juan Merchan upholds President-elect Donald Trump's felony conviction, but signals that he will sentence him to an unconditional discharge.
  - President Joe Biden blocks the proposed acquisition of U.S. Steel by Nippon Steel.
- January 4 – Biden awards the Presidential Medal of Freedom to 18 individuals.
- January 6:
  - Electoral College vote count: Congress votes to certify Trump's victory.
  - Biden issues a ban on new oil and gas drilling along most coasts.
- January 9 – The funeral of former President Jimmy Carter takes place.
- January 10:
  - Vice President-elect JD Vance resigns from the United States Senate.
  - President-elect Donald Trump is sentenced to an "unconditional discharge" for 34 counts of falsifying business records in his New York hush money case.
- January 11 - Special counsel Jack Smith resigns from the Department of Justice after completing his investigation into Trump's involvement in the January 6 riots and his mishandling of government records.
- January 20 - Donald Trump is sworn as the 47th president of the United States, while JD Vance is sworn in as the 50th vice president of the United States.
- January 23 - Donald Trump's proposed birthright citizenship order is temporarily blocked by Senior Judge of the United States District Court for the Western District of Washington John C. Coughenour.
- January 27 - Donald Trump signed executive order that ban transgender individuals from military service.
- January 28 - federal judge passed a restraining order to block Trump adminstrations federal funding pause on grants and loans.
- January 29 - Donald Trump signs a legislation into law which mandates the federal detention and custody of undocumented immigrants.
- January 31 - The Department of Justice submits request seeking the names of thousands of FBI employees who participated in or handled investigations related to the January 6 Capitol attack.

=== February ===
- February 1 - President Donald Trump impose and additional 25% tariff on Canada and Mexico; 10% tariff on goods from China.
- February 2 - Federal employees across the country was offered to resign from their positions and many at the Education Department were placed on paid leave associated with DEI.
- February 3 - President Trump agreed to last minute short term pause on the expected 25% tariffs for Canada and Mexico.
- February 4 - During a joint white house conference with Israeli Prime Minister Benjamin Netanyahu, President Trump suggested clearing, depopulating and redeveloping it into "the Riviera of the Middle East".
- February 5 - President Trump signed executive order to ban transgender athletes from participating in girls' and women's sports.
- February 6 - The Trump administration presents a proposal for restructuring of the United States Agency for International Development (USAID).
- February 7 - President Trump signed executive order against South Africa targeting land expropriation policies and initiating restrictions on foreign assistance allocations.
- February 8 - Civil liberties and labor networks filed emergency lawsuits regarding the validity of early executive actions regarding federal staffing rollbacks.
- February 9 - President Trump signed executive order federal departments to rename Gulf of Mexico with the Gulf of America.
- February 10 - 25% mandatory tariffs were issued on all imported steel and aluminum articles.
- February 11 - American schoolteacher Marc Fogel is released by Russian authorities.
- February 12 - President Trump conducts a 90-minute phone conversation with Russian President Vladimir Putin.
- February 13 - The United States Senate confirm the executive nomination of Robert F. Kennedy Jr. as the Secretary of Health and Human Services.
- February 14 - President Trump signed executive orders against compulsory student COVID-19 vaccination mandates.
- February 15 - Hamas released American-Israeli civilian Sagui Dekel-Chen.
- February 16 - 13 soon to be immigration judges, 2 serving judges fired by Trump administration.
- February 17 - "No Kings Day" rallies against mass federal workforce terminations across the US.
- February 18 - President Trump signed executive order opposing the operational independence of federal regulatory bodies.
- February 19 - President Trump signed Executive Order 14217, titled "Commencing the Reduction of the Federal Bureaucracy,"
- February 20 - Senate votes to formally confirm Kash Patel nomination to serve as the Director of the Federal Bureau of Investigation (FBI).
- February 21 - President Trump and Secretary of Defense Pete Hegseth removed multiple senior U.S. military officers including Charles Q. Brown Jr., the Chairman of the Joint Chiefs of Staff.
- February 22 - Co-leader of the Department of Government Efficiency (DOGE) Elon Musk issued administrative ultimatum, via mass emails demanding that federal employees submit a 5 bullet point work justification.
- February 23 - President Trump via Truth Social sent a formal congratulations for Friedrich Merz, after his conservative Christian Democratic Union (CDU) won a snap federal election.
- February 24 - President Trump hosted French President Emmanuel Macron at the White House.
- February 25 - House Republicans passed a legislative resolution through the lower chamber, toward enacting $4.5 trillion in tax breaks and $2 trillion in spending cuts.
- February 26 - Chief Justice John Roberts blocked the Trump administration from liquidating $2 billion in previously approved foreign assistance awards that had been frozen under recent White House directives.
- February 27 - President Trump hosted British then Prime Minister Keir Starmer at the White House.
- February 28 - Globally televised highly contentious meeting engaged between President Trump, Vice President JD Vance and Ukrainian President Volodymyr Zelenskyy at the Oval Office.

=== March ===
- March 1 - English was designated as the Official Language of The United States.
- March 2 - The United States suspends all active planning and execution of offensive cyber operations against Russia.
- March 3 - U.S.A. Suspends All Military Aid to Ukraine.
- March 4 - president Trump delivers first Congress address of second term.
- March 5 - Trump rejected Canadian Prime Minister request to halt 25-percent tariffs.
- March 6 - US pauses tariffs on some Canadian, Mexican products for 1 month.

== See also ==
- Timeline of the Joe Biden presidency (2024 Q4–January 2025)
- Timeline of the Donald Trump presidency (2025 Q1)
