= Heigh-Ho =

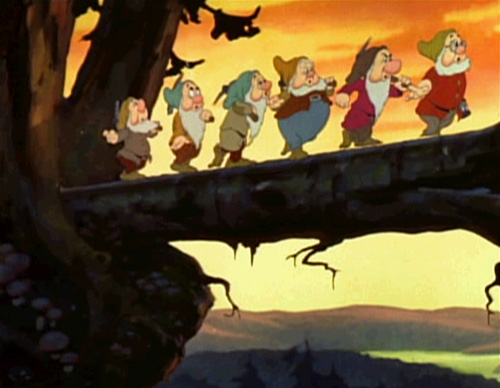
- Six of the Seven Dwarfs (top center, right to left; Doc, Grumpy, Happy, Sleepy, Bashful, and Sneezy; Dopey cannot be seen) walking across a log while singing the song

Song by Roy Atwell, Otis Harlan, Billy Gilbert, Pinto Colvig, Scotty Mattraw

from the album Snow White and the Seven Dwarfs
- Released: January 1938
- Recorded: 1937
- Composer: Frank Churchill
- Lyricist: Larry Morey

"Heigh-Ho" is a song from Walt Disney's 1937 animated film Snow White and the Seven Dwarfs, written by Frank Churchill (music) and Larry Morey (lyrics). It is sung by the group of Seven Dwarfs as they work at a mine with diamonds and rubies, and is one of the best-known songs in the film. The other Dwarf Chorus songs are "Bluddle-Uddle-Um-Dum" (the washing-up song) and "The Silly Song". The song is actually only sung by six dwarfs due to Dopey being completely mute.

The expression "heigh-ho" was first recorded in 1553 and is defined as an expression of "yawning, sighing, languor, weariness, disappointment". Eventually, it blended meanings with the similarly spelled "hey-ho". The phrase "hey-ho" first appeared in print in 1471, according to the Oxford English Dictionary, which says it has nautical origins, meant to mark the rhythm of movement in heaving or hauling.

The song was recorded by Horace Heidt and his Brigadiers, with vocal chorus sung by The Kings and Glee Club, for Brunswick Records in January, 1938 (Brunswick 8074). The record made it to No. 4 on Your Hit Parade in April 1938 and stayed on the charts for 10 weeks.

== In Disney-related media ==
Trailer featuring "Heigh-Ho"

=== Film, stage and television ===
Donald Duck sings this song in "The Volunteer Worker" and "The Riveter". In The Goodies final series special "Snow White 2" the trio and the dwarfs sing the song in the beginning.

In Gremlins, during the local movie theatre scene, the gremlins were watching the film, and singing along with the song.

The song was also featured in the 1979 stage adaption of the 1937 animated musical film. In the 1988 Disney animated film Oliver & Company, Tito sings "Heigh-Ho, Heigh-Ho, it's off to work we go" when he is rescuing Jenny.

The song appears in the 2025 live-action remake of the original animated film, being extended and featuring new lyrics.

=== Music ===
The song appears, with altered lyrics, at the finale of Walt Disney's Enchanted Tiki Room at Disneyland and Walt Disney World's Magic Kingdom, and is also used at the Seven Dwarfs Mine Train attraction. In 1955, Jack Pleis recorded it for his album, Music from Disneyland.

Los Lobos recorded a Spanish-language cover of this song for their 2009 album Los Lobos Goes Disney. On the 2011 album V-Rock Disney, which features visual kei artists covering Disney songs, Cascade covered this song. Dave Brubeck's version of the song appears on the soundtrack to the 2013 film Saving Mr. Banks.

Also Louis Amstrong recorder a pop version for this song.

== See also ==
- Snow White and the Seven Dwarfs (soundtrack)
