= The Silly Song =

Song by Otis Harlan, Billy Gilbert, Pinto Colvig, Roy Atwell, and Scotty Mattraw
- Released: 1937
- Composer: Frank E. Churchill
- Lyricist: Larry Morey

"The Silly Song", also known as "The Dwarfs' Yodel Song", is a song from Walt Disney's 1937 animated film Snow White and the Seven Dwarfs sung by Otis Harlan, Billy Gilbert, Pinto Colvig, Roy Atwell, and Scotty Mattraw. This features an instrument septet. The Seven Dwarfs yodel in this song. The melody is taken from the Irish folk song "Peggy Lettermore". The song also appears in the 2025 live-action remake of the film.

== Synopsis of the number ==
After discovering Snow White in their house and having dinner, the dwarfs throw a party for Snow White. In the song, Happy and Bashful each sing about something silly, both of which are followed by a chorus. After which, the dwarfs all take turns dancing with Snow White. A little more than halfway through the song, Dopey climbs onto Sneezy's shoulders while wearing a long cloak so that he could seem like a tall enough dance partner for Snow White. They dance with her for a little while, and then she lets them dance on their own. Dopey's dance is abruptly ended when Sneezy lets out a really big sneeze causing Dopey to pop out, fly upward and out of the coat, and safely into the cottage's rafters.

The scene includes a controversial moment when Snow White kicks the cymbal Dopey is holding and he puts it on his head like a Chinese hat (a joke repeated 33 years later in The Aristocats when a Siamese Cat named Shun Gon puts a Cymbal on his head during the Everybody Wants to be a Cat number).

This song includes a drum solo by Dopey, driven by his pursuit of a pesky housefly, an organ solo by Grumpy, and a lute solo by Doc. This segment is immediately followed by the "Someday My Prince Will Come" segment.

An additional verse for Sneezy is found on the 1938 Snow White Soundtrack 78 record. Verses for Doc are not used during the song in the movie.

In the 2025 live-action remake, the song is shortened to just its chorus being sung twice by the dwarfs along with members of Jonathan's seven bandits.

== Personnel ==
Grumpy: finely carved pump-organ.
Sleepy: clarinet-like wind-instrument, similar to a tárogató or soprano saxophone in sound, shaped like a fish.
Bashful: concertina.
Sneezy: yodel; also lute.
Dopey: drum-kit.
Doc: double-bass-like instrument (without a bow) called a swanette; also Sneezy's lute.
Happy: yodel; also Doc's swanette and Dopey's drum-kit at the end.

== Disney Sing-Along Edits ==
The song is featured on the Disney Sing-Along Songs volumes, "Heigh Ho" and "Topsy Turvy". Since it is a fairly long number with not many lyrics to sing along to, the versions on the Sing-Alongs are edited down. The following edits were made for such videos:

- After Bashful's verse and the following chorus, the sing-along versions immediately cut to Dopey and Sneezy coming out to the dance floor in the coat.
- Doc's lute solo is cut from both sing-along versions.
- After Sneezy sneezes Dopey out of the coat, there is a shot of Dopey showing where he landed in the rafters. This clip was cut from the version on "Heigh Ho" but was restored for "Topsy Turvy".
