= Whistle While You Work =

Song from Snow White, 1937 Disney film

"Whistle While You Work" is a song with music written by Frank Churchill and lyrics written by Larry Morey for the 1937 animated Disney film Snow White and the Seven Dwarfs. It was performed in the film by voice actress Adriana Caselotti as Snow White. It was also featured in the 1979 stage adaptation. A rewritten version appears in the 2025 live-action remake of the original film, performed by Rachel Zegler as the titular character, along with the seven magical beings. (Note: The characters are not referred to as "dwarfs" in the film. The term "magical beings" was used in promotion.)

== Covers and parodies ==
External audio
- You may hear "Whistle While You Work" sung by Adriana Caselotti in 1937; Here on ucsb.edu
- You may hear "Whistle While You Work" interpreted by Shep Fields and his Rippling Rhythm Orchestra with John Serry Sr in 1937; Here on Archive.org

- Shep Fields collaborated with John Serry Sr. to record the song for Bluebird Records in 1937.
- The song is whistled by one of the toys created by Mr. Poppins, played by Donald Meek, in the 1938 film You Can't Take It With You.
- The song was covered in the form of rock-and-roll by Alvin and the Chipmunks for their 1959 debut album Let's All Sing with The Chipmunks and would later be adapted into a musical segment on The Alvin Show in 1962.
- Louis Armstrong recorded a cover of the song for his album Disney Songs the Satchmo Way in 1968. Armstrong's cover was used in a Samsung Galaxy Note 7 commercial.
- The song was covered by The Kidsongs Kids for the Kidsongs video A Day at Camp, released in 1989.
- Sony Music included a Children's Chorus version on the 3-CD release Favorite Children's Songs in 2004.
- A children's parody version of the song often uses lyrics such as "Hitler is a jerk, Mussolini is a weenie." (Or in a more vulgar vein, "...Mussolini bit his weenie, now it doesn't squirt (or "work" in another version)!" or "...Mussolini chopped his weenie, now it doesn't work!" ) Several variants are cited in Iona and Peter Opie's survey, The Lore and Language of Schoolchildren. One variant is "Whistle While You Work. Hitler is a jerk, Mussolini is a meanie and the Japs are worse."
- The Dad's Army episode "The Deadly Attachment" contains a scene in which Private Pike sings a parody of the song mocking Hitler to a captured German officer. This prompts the prisoner to add Pike's name to a list of names for whom retribution will be sought after the war ends, after Captain Mainwaring inadvertently gives it away by exclaiming "Don't tell him, Pike!" after the prisoner asks what it is.
- Django Reinhardt and Ray Ventura et ses Collégiens recorded a version entitled "Sifflez en travaillant" in the jazz guitar and swing style, featured on the album "Intégrale Django Reinhardt Vol 7 (1937-1938)".
- NRBQ covered the song as part of the track "Medley Four" in the 1988 tribute album Stay Awake: Various Interpretations of Music from Vintage Disney Films.
- Ying Yang Twins interpolated the song in 2000's "Whistle While You Twurk".
- English singer Katy Tiz makes references to Whistle While You Work in her song and video for Whistle (While You Work It).
