= Larry Morey =

American screenwriter (1905–1971)

Lawrence L. Morey (March 26, 1905 – May 8, 1971) was an American lyricist and screenwriter. He co-wrote some of the most successful songs in Disney films of the 1930s and 1940s, including "Heigh-Ho", "Some Day My Prince Will Come", and "Whistle While You Work", and was also responsible for adapting Felix Salten's book Bambi, A Life in the Woods into the 1942 Disney film Bambi.

== Career ==
He was born in Los Angeles, California. Larry was born with a skeletal limb abnormality. His left arm was not fully formed and caused his mother to reject him at birth, saying "he would never amount to anything." She abandoned him to the care of his father, George T. Morey, a traveling musical ventriloquist. When he was only six years old, his father left him in a boarding house in Los Angeles and went on the road performing throughout California. Larry attended UCLA, then went to work for Warner Bros. and Paramount, for whom he wrote the lyrics to "The World Owes Me a Living", composed by Leigh Harline and sung by Shirley Temple in the film Now and Forever. He joined Disney in 1933, and wrote songs for several animated shorts, including The Wise Little Hen and The Grasshopper and the Ants. Working with composer Frank Churchill, he then wrote some 25 songs for Disney's first full-length cartoon, Snow White and the Seven Dwarfs, in 1937. Eight of their songs were used in the film, including "Heigh-Ho", "Some Day My Prince Will Come", "Whistle While You Work", and "I'm Wishing", and the film was nominated for an Academy Award for Best Original Score. It is little known that Larry could only peck at the piano, due to his withered arm, but was very talented musically. Walt Disney used to say that a talented artist only had one great work in them, and would release them after he felt they had used that creativity. He said that Larry Morey was his one exception. Once Walt Disney was giving a tour of the studio to some guests, and they came upon Larry Morey leaning back in a chair with his eyes closed. Mr. Disney told the visitors to not disturb him because he was working. Larry had a great love for Japanese culture. He created a script about a cricket, set in the Japanese Edo period, that was never published. He named it Happy Mountain.

In 1938 Morey collaborated with composer Albert Hay Malotte on the title song for Ferdinand the Bull, which won an Academy Award for Best Animated Short Film, and he worked with Frank Churchill on the score for The Reluctant Dragon in 1941. The following year he and Perce Pearce were responsible for adapting the book Bambi into the animated film of the same name. With Churchill, Morey was responsible for the film score, and both it and the song "Love Is a Song" were nominated for Oscars. In 1949, he received another Academy Award nomination, with composer Eliot Daniel, for the song "Lavender Blue (Dilly Dilly)", sung by Burl Ives in the film So Dear to My Heart.

Morey died at the age of 66 in Santa Barbara, California.
