= Feel No Fret =

Studio album by Average White Band
- Released: March 7, 1979
- Studios: Compass Point, Nassau, Bahamas
- Genres: Blue-eyed soul, funk, soul, disco
- Labels: RCA (UK), Atlantic (US)
- Producers: Average White Band, Gene Paul

Average White Band chronology
| Warmer Communications (1978) | Feel No Fret (1979) | Shine (1980) |

Feel No Fret is the seventh album by Scottish funk and R&B band Average White Band (also AWB) released in 1979 on the RCA label in the United Kingdom and the Atlantic label in North America.

It reached No. 15 in the UK charts, with 15 weeks in total on the charts, and No. 32 in the US charts. In Canada it reached just No. 86.

The album was rereleased in 1994 on the Atlantic & Atco, Rhino Entertainment Remasters Series as "Feel No Fret... and More," containing 4 Bonus Tracks from the 1980 "Shine" sessions.

== Critical reaction ==
Professional ratings
Review scores
| Source | Rating |
|---|---|
| AllMusic | 2.5/5 stars |
| Christgau's Record Guide | C |

AllMusic called the album "the most uneven album they recorded in the '70s", with positives including "Atlantic Avenue", "When Will You Be Mine", and their cover of the Bacharach and David song "Walk on By".

== Track listing ==
Side 1

1. "When Will You Be Mine" (Gorrie, Average White Band)
2. "Please Don't Fall In Love" (Ball, Gorrie)
3. "Walk On By" (Hal David, Burt Bacharach) - (#91 Hot 100 - # 32 R&B single) # 18 UK chart
4. "Feel No Fret" (Stuart, Average White Band, Gorrie, Ferrone)

Side 2

1. "Stop the Rain" (Gorrie, Stuart)
2. "Atlantic Avenue" (Ferrone, Gorrie, Average White Band) - # 24 UK chart
3. "Ace of Hearts" (Ferrone, Gorrie, Stuart)
4. "Too Late to Cry" (Stuart)
5. "Fire Burning" (Gorrie, White)

1994 Rhino/Atlantic Reissue as "Feel No Fret... and More"

1–9 Original album tracks (as above)

10. "Kiss Me"(Hamish Stuart)
11. "Love Won't Get In The Way" (Alan Gorrie, Gavin Christopher, Hamish Stuart)
12. "Love Gives, Love Takes Away" (Alan Gorrie)
13. "Growing Pains" (Alan Gorrie, David Foster, Hamish Stuart)

== Personnel ==
Average White Band

- Alan Gorrie – vocals; guitar (tracks 1–3, 6), bass (tracks 4, 5, 7–9)
- Hamish Stuart – vocals; bass (tracks 1–3, 6), guitar (tracks 4, 5, 7–9)
- Roger Ball – keyboards, synthesizer, alto saxophone
- Malcolm Duncan – tenor saxophone
- Steve Ferrone – drums, percussion
- Onnie McIntyre – guitar, vocals

Additional musicians

- Luis Carlos Dos Santos – surdo on "Atlantic Avenue"
- Zeca de Cuica – cuica on "Atlantic Avenue"
- Airto Moreira – percussion on "Atlantic Avenue"
- Mike Brecker – tenor saxophone on "Stop The Rain" and "Fire Burning"
- Randy Brecker – trumpet on "Stop The Rain" and "Fire Burning"
- Lew Delgatto – baritone saxophone on "Stop The Rain" and "Fire Burning"
- Luther Vandross – additional background vocals on "Too Late To Cry"

Production

- Recorded at Compass Point Studios, Nassau, Bahamas
- Recording Engineer Gene Paul assisted by Benji Armbrister
- Mixed at Soundmixers, New York.
- Remix Engineer Gene Paul assisted by Tim Bomba
- Mastered at Atlantic Studios, New York
- Mastering Engineer: George Piros
