= Warmer Communications =

Studio album by Average White Band
- Released: March 1978
- Recorded: 1978
- Genres: Funk, soul
- Length: 44:43
- Label: Atlantic
- Producer: Arif Mardin

Average White Band chronology
Benny and Us (1977)	Warmer Communications (1978)	Feel No Fret (1979)

Professional ratings
Review scores
Source	Rating
AllMusic	4/5 stars

Warmer Communications is a studio album released by Average White Band. The title is a play on Warner Communications, parent company of AWB's Atlantic Records label at the time of the album's release.

The album was rereleased in 1994 on the Atlantic & Atco, Rhino Entertainment Remasters Series as Warmer Communications... and More, containing as bonus tracks AWB's two live performances from The Atlantic Family Live at Montreux (Atlantic #2-3000 June 1, 1978).

== Track listing ==
1. "Your Love Is a Miracle" (White, Gorrie) – 6:04
2. "Same Feeling, Different Song" (Stuart, White, Gorrie, Ball) – 5:16
3. "Daddy's All Gone" (James Taylor) – 4:38
4. "Big City Lights" (Ferrone, Gorrie, Stuart) – 4:52
5. "She's a Dream" (Stuart) – 5:36
6. "Warmer Communications" (Gorrie, Ferrone, Ball, Stuart) – 4:07
7. "The Price of the Dream" (Gorrie, White) – 3:59
8. "Sweet & Sour" (Gorrie, Stuart, Ball) – 4:50
9. "One Look Over My Shoulder (Is This Really Goodbye?)" (Ball, Gorrie, Stuart) – 3:55

1994 Rhino Reissue as "Warmer Communications... and More" 1–9 Original album tracks (as above)

10. "McEwan's Export" (Live) (Alan Gorrie) – 8:58
11. "Pick Up the Pieces" (Live) (Roger Ball, Hamish Stuart, AWB) – 21:40

== Personnel ==
Average White Band

- Alan Gorrie – Bass, Guitar, Lead and Backing Vocals
- Hamish Stuart – Bass, Guitar, Lead and Backing Vocals
- Roger Ball – Keyboards, Alto Saxophone, String Arrangements, Horn Arrangements
- Malcolm Duncan – Tenor Saxophone, Soprano Saxophone
- Onnie McIntyre – Guitar, Vocals
- Steve Ferrone – Drums, Percussion

with:

- Cornell Dupree – guitar on "Daddy's All Gone"
- Michael Brecker – flute on "She's a Dream", additional tenor saxophone and flute
- Randy Brecker – additional trumpet
- Ray Barretto – additional percussion and congas
- Lew Delgatto – additional baritone saxophone and flute
- Marvin Stamm – additional trumpet
- Barry Rogers, Tom Malone – additional trombone
- Rubens Bassini – additional percussion

== Charts ==
Chart (1978)	Peak position
Billboard Top LPs	28
Billboard Soul LPs	12
RPM Canada	31

=== Singles ===
Year	Single	Chart positions
Year	Single	US R&B
1978	"Your Love Is a Miracle"	33
