= Burning for Buddy: A Tribute to the Music of Buddy Rich =

Studio album by various artists with the Buddy Rich Big Band
- Released: October 4, 1994
- Recorded: May 1994
- Studios: Power Station, New York City
- Genre: Big band
- Length: 75:48
- Label: Atlantic
- Producer: Neil Peart

Burning for Buddy tribute chronology
| Burning for Buddy: A Tribute to the Music of Buddy Rich (1994) | Burning for Buddy: A Tribute to the Music of Buddy Rich, Vol. 2 (1997) |

Professional ratings
Review scores
| Source | Rating |
|---|---|
| Allmusic | (link) |
| MusicHound Rock | 3/5 stars |

Burning for Buddy, Volume 1 is a 1994 Buddy Rich tribute album produced by Rush drummer/lyricist Neil Peart. The album is composed of performances by various rock and jazz drummers, all accompanied by the Buddy Rich Big Band. A follow-up Burning for Buddy...Volume 2 recording was released in 1997 and both recording sessions were also covered in a 5-hour documentary video released on VHS in 1996, reissued on DVD in 2006, The Making of Burning for Buddy....

== Track listing ==
| No. | Title | Writer(s) | Drummer | Length |
|---|---|---|---|---|
| 1. | "Dancing Men" (arr. John LaBarbera) | John LaBarbera | Simon Phillips | 6:36 |
| 2. | "Mercy, Mercy, Mercy" (arr. Phil Wilson) | Joe Zawinul | Dave Weckl | 5:05 |
| 3. | "Love for Sale" (arr. Pete Myers) | Cole Porter | Steve Gadd | 4:27 |
| 4. | "Beulah Witch" (arr. Harold Wheeler) | Don Menza | Matt Sorum | 4:28 |
| 5. | "Nutville" (arr. Greg Hopkins) | Greg Hopkins | Steve Smith | 5:06 |
| 6. | "Cotton Tail" (arr. John LaBarbera) | Duke Ellington | Neil Peart | 4:32 |
| 7. | "No Jive" (arr. Bob Mintzer) | Bob Mintzer | Manu Katche; Mino Cinelu | 5:44 |
| 8. | "Milestones" (arr. Herbie Phillips) | Miles Davis | Billy Cobham | 5:03 |
| 9. | "The Drum Also Waltzes, Pt. 1" | Max Roach | Max Roach | 1:03 |
| 10. | "Machine" (arr. Bill Reddie) | Bill Reddie | Rod Morgenstein | 3:43 |
| 11. | "Straight, No Chaser" (arr. John LaBarbera) | Thelonious Monk | Kenny Aronoff | 3:38 |
| 12. | "Slow Funk" (arr. Bob Mintzer) | Bob Mintzer | Omar Hakim | 5:29 |
| 13. | "Shawnee" (arr. Mike Barone) | Mike Barone | Ed Shaughnessy | 3:05 |
| 14. | "Drumorello" | Joe Morello | Joe Morello | 3:09 |
| 15. | "The Drum Also Waltzes, Pt. 2" | Max Roach | Max Roach | 0:42 |
| 16. | "Lingo" (arr. C. Batchelor) | Bill Bruford | Bill Bruford | 4:31 |
| 17. | "Ya Gotta Try" (arr. Sammy Nestico) | Sammy Nestico | Marvin "Smitty" Smith | 3:14 |
| 18. | "Pick Up the Pieces" (arr. Arif Mardin) | Roger Ball; Malcolm Duncan; Alan Gorrie; Onnie McIntyre; Robbie McIntosh; Hamish Stuart | Steve Ferrone | 5:35 |
| Total length: | | | | 1:15:10 |
