= School Boy Crush =

Single by Average White Band

from the album Cut the Cake
- Released: June 1975
- Genre: Disco, R&B, funk
- Label: Atlantic
- Songwriters: Roger Ball, Malcolm "Molly" Duncan, Steve Ferrone, Alan Gorrie, Onnie McIntyre, Hamish Stuart

"School Boy Crush" is a song from Average White Band's 1975 album, Cut the Cake.

It has been heavily sampled in hip hop, rap and R&B songs such as:

1. "Ain't 2 Proud 2 Beg" by TLC
2. "Wanna B Where U R (Thisizzaluvsong)" by Floetry
3. "Watch Me Do My Thing" by Immature featuring Juanita "Smooth" Stokes and Kel Mitchell as Ed from Good Burger
4. "One Nite Stand" by Father MC
5. "Microphone Fiend" by Eric B. & Rakim
6. "New Agenda" by Janet Jackson
7. "Tear Shit Up" by Kurious
8. "Halftime" by Nas
9. "Life Is...Too Short" by Too Short
10. "What Goes On" by Artifacts
11. "Think About It (Special Ed)" by Special Ed
12. "Listen Me Tic (So So Def Remix)" by Ini Kamoze featuring Da Brat & Jermaine Dupri
13. "Shy Guy" by Diana King
