= Soul Searching (Average White Band album) =

Studio album by Average White Band
- Released: June 24, 1976
- Recorded: 1975–1976
- Genre: Funk, soul
- Label: Atlantic
- Producer: Arif Mardin

Average White Band chronology
Cut the Cake (1975)	Soul Searching (1976)	Person to Person (1976)

Professional ratings
Review scores
Source	Rating
AllMusic	4/5 stars

Soul Searching is the fourth album released by Average White Band. It was certified platinum by the RIAA for sales of over 1 million copies.

== Track listing ==
1. "Overture" (Average White Band, Ball, Stuart) - 2:14
2. "Love Your Life" (Average White Band, Gorrie, Stuart) - 4:49
3. "I'm the One" (Average White Band, Ball, Gorrie, Stuart) - 4:18
4. "A Love of Your Own" (Stuart, Ned Doheny) - 5:28
5. "Queen of My Soul" (Stuart) - 6:05
6. "Soul Searching" (Gorrie, Stuart) - 3:15
7. "Goin' Home" (Ball, Average White Band, Gorrie, Stuart) - 4:36
8. "Everybody's Darling" (Ball, Stuart) - 3:31
9. "Would You Stay" (Ball, Stuart) - 5:33
10. "Sunny Days" (Ferrone, Stuart, Gorrie) - 3:14
11. "Digging Deeper" (Average White Band, Ball, Gorrie) - 2:43

== Personnel ==
Average White Band

- Alan Gorrie – bass, guitar, lead and backing vocals
- Hamish Stuart – bass, guitar, lead and backing vocals
- Roger Ball – keyboards, alto saxophone, string arrangements, horn arrangements
- Malcolm Duncan – tenor saxophone
- Onnie McIntyre – guitar, backing vocals
- Steve Ferrone – drums, percussion

with:

- Michael Brecker – tenor saxophone
- Randy Brecker – trumpet
- Jim Mullen – guitar
- Kenneth Bichel – synthesizer
- Seymour Barab, Alan Shulman, Jesse Levy – cello
- Carlos Martin – percussion, conga
- Barry Rogers – trombone
- Marvin Stamm – trumpet
- Ronnie Cuber – baritone saxophone
- David Brigati, Eddie Brigati – backing vocals

== Charts ==
Year	Album	Chart positions		
Year	Album	US	US R&B	Canada
1976	Soul Searching	9	2	20

=== Singles ===
Year	Single	Chart positions		
Year	Single	US	US R&B	US Dance
1976	"Queen of My Soul"	40	21	—
1976	"Soul Searching"	—	—	4
1977	"A Love of Your Own"	101	35	—
