= AWB (album) =

Studio album by The Average White Band
- Released: 23 August 1974
- Recorded: December 1973 – May 1974
- Studios: Atlantic, New York City; Criteria, Miami
- Genres: Funk, soul
- Length: 40:24
- Label: Atlantic
- Producer: Arif Mardin

The Average White Band chronology
Show Your Hand (1973)	AWB (1974)	Cut the Cake (1975)

alternative cover
- Expanded 2CD re-issue cover

AWB also known as The White Album and also AWB '74 (The White Album) is the second studio album by the Scottish funk and soul band Average White Band, released on 23 August 1974.

AWB topped Billboard's Pop Albums and Black Albums charts. Its million-selling single "Pick Up the Pieces" knocked Linda Ronstadt's "You're No Good" out of #1 on Billboard's Hot 100. In Canada, the album was #2 for 3 weeks to Elton John's Greatest Hits.

A 2004 expanded re-issue from Sony/Columbia in the UK includes a bonus CD with several demo session recordings made before the group joined Atlantic Records – taken from the so-called "Clover Sessions," recorded at Clover Studios, Los Angeles, CA, in 1973. This album was eventually released as How Sweet Can You Get?

AWB was the final Average White Band album to feature the band's original drummer Robbie McIntosh, who died in late September 1974, a month after the album's release.

== Reception ==
Professional ratings
Review scores
Source	Rating
AllMusic	4.5/5 stars
Christgau's Record Guide	A−
Tom Hull – on the Web	B+

== Track listing ==
Side one

1. "You Got It" (Roger Ball, Hamish Stuart, Alan Gorrie) – 3:38
2. "Got the Love" (Stuart, Ball, Robbie McIntosh) – 3:52
3. "Pick Up the Pieces" (Average White Band) – 3:58
4. "Person to Person" (Average White Band) – 3:38
5. "Work to Do" (O'Kelly Isley, Ronald Isley, Rudolph Isley) – 4:21

Side two

1. "Nothing You Can Do" (Gorrie, Stuart, Ball) – 4:06
2. "Just Wanna Love You Tonight" (Ball, Gorrie) – 3:57
3. "Keepin' It to Myself" (Gorrie) – 3:52
4. "I Just Can't Give You Up" (Stuart) – 3:24
5. "There's Always Someone Waiting" (Gorrie) – 5:38

All songs arranged by Average White Band. All horn parts arranged by Roger Ball.

Bonus track on 1995 Rhino re-issue (Rhino 71588)
11. "Pick Up the Pieces" – 21:40 (from The Atlantic Family Live at Montreux)

=== Expanded 2CD re-issue (2004) ===
Disc one

Original release

Disc two – The Clover Sessions / How Sweet Can You Get?

1. "Person to Person"
2. "Keepin' It To Myself"
3. "There's Always Someone Waiting"
4. "McEwan's Export"
5. "Got the Love"
6. "Work to Do"
7. "Just Want to Love You Tonight"
8. "Pick Up the Pieces"
9. "I Just Can't Give You Up"
10. "How Sweet Can You Get (Mark 1)"

Bonus tracks on 2005 Columbia-Europe re-issue (Columbia 520204)
11. "How Sweet Can You Get (Mark 1)"
12. "McEwan's Export"

== Personnel ==
=== Average White Band ===
- Alan Gorrie – lead vocals (on "Keepin' It To Myself" and "There's Always Someone Waiting"), co-lead vocals (on "You Got It", "Work To Do", "Nothing You Can Do", and "Just Wanna Love You Tonight"), background vocals, bass, guitar (on "You Got It")
- Hamish Stuart – lead vocals (on "Got The Love", "Person To Person", and "I Just Can't Give You Up"), co-lead vocals (on "You Got It", "Work To Do", "Nothing You Can Do", and "Just Wanna Love You Tonight"), background vocals, lead guitar, bass (on "You Got It")
- Roger Ball – keyboards, alto & baritone saxophones
- Molly Duncan – tenor saxophone
- Onnie McIntyre – background vocals, guitar, guitar solo on "Work To Do"
- Robbie McIntosh – drums, percussion

=== Additional musicians ===
- Ralph MacDonald – congas, percussion
- Michael Brecker – tenor saxophone
- Randy Brecker – trumpet
- Marvin Stamm – trumpet
- Mel Davis – trumpet
- Glenn Ferris – trombone
- Ken Bichel – mellotron (on "Just Wanna Love You Tonight")

=== Other musicians ===
(Live at Montreux bonus track)

- Sonny Fortune – alto saxophone
- Jaroslav Jakubovič – baritone saxophone
- David "Fathead" Newman – alto saxophone
- Dick Morrissey – tenor saxophone
- Herbie Mann – flute
- Don Ellis – trumpet
- Lew Soloff – trumpet
- Gil Rathel – trumpet
- Barry Rogers – trombone
- Alan Kaplan – trombone
- Jim Mullen – guitar
- Richard Tee – electric piano
- Raphael Cruz – percussion
- Sammy Figueroa – percussion

==== Production ====
- Gene Paul – mixing, engineering (NYC)
- Lewis Hahn – engineering (NYC)
- Karl Richardson – engineering (Miami)
- Steve Klein – engineering (Miami)
- Ron Albert – engineering (Miami)
- Howard Albert – engineering (Miami)
- Jimmy Douglass – engineering (additional recording)
- Bobby Warner – engineering (additional recording)
- Dennis King – mastering engineer
- Arif Mardin – production, mixing
- Alan Pariser – direction
- Alan Gorrie – logo concept
- Tim Bruckner – front cover drawing
- Barry Feinstein – design & photography

=== Other Album Notes ===
"AWB would like to express their deep appreciation to Jerry Wexler, Alan Pariser and Bruce McCaskill."

== Chart positions ==
=== Album ===
==== Weekly ====
Chart (1975)	Peak position
Australia (Kent Music Report)	22
Canada Top Albums/CDs (RPM)	2
New Zealand Albums (RMNZ)	40
UK Albums (Official Charts)	6
US Billboard 200	1

==== Year-end ====
Chart (1975)	Position
Canada Top Albums/CDs (RPM)	14
US Billboard 200	8

=== Singles ===
Year	Single	Chart	Position
1974	"Pick Up The Pieces"	Disco Singles	10
1974	"Work To Do"	Disco Singles	10
1975	"Pick Up The Pieces"	Pop Singles	1
1975	"Pick Up The Pieces"	Black Singles	5

== See also ==
- List of Billboard 200 number-one albums of 1975
- List of Billboard number-one R&B albums of 1975
