= Cupid's in Fashion =

Cupid’s in Fashion

Studio album by Average White Band
- Released: 1982
- Studios: Sigma Sound, New York City
- Genres: Blue-eyed soul, funk, soul
- Label: Arista
- Producer: Dan Hartman

Average White Band chronology
Shine (1980)	Cupid’s in Fashion (1982)	Aftershock (1989)

Alternative Album Art

Cupid's in Fashion is the ninth album by the Average White Band (also AWB), a Scottish funk and R&B band. It was released in 1982 on the Arista label and peaked at No. 49 in the R&B album charts.

== Track listing ==
Side 1

1. "You’re My Number One" (Dan Hartman)
2. "Easier Said Than Done" (Kashif)
3. "You Wanna Belong" (Roger Ball, Vivian Cherry)
4. "Cupid’s in Fashion" (Hamish Stuart, Alan Gorrie, Roger Ball, White)
5. "Theatre of Excess" (Alan Gorrie, White)

Side 2

1. "I Believe" (Keith Forsey, Harold Faltermeyer)
2. "Is it Love That You’re Running From" (Alan Gorrie)
3. "Reach Out I'll Be There" (Holland-Dozier-Holland)
4. "Isn’t it Strange" (Hamish Stuart, Ned Doheny)
5. "Love’s a Heartache" (Ned Doheny)

== Personnel ==
Average White Band

- Alan Gorrie – lead vocals, bass, guitar and keyboards
- Hamish Stuart – lead vocals, guitar and bass
- Roger Ball – keyboards and alto saxophone
- Steve Ferrone – drums
- Malcolm Duncan – tenor saxophone and flute
- Onnie McIntyre – guitar and vocals

Additional musicians

- Jeff Bova – synthesiser
- Randy Brecker – trumpet and flugelhorn
- Dan Hartman – piano and background vocals
- Sammy Figueroa – percussion
- Mark Gray – synthesiser solo on “Love’s a Heartache”
- Joe Melotti – background vocals on “Cupid’s in Fashion”
- Richie Stotts – guitar sound effect on “Theatre of Excess”
- Robert Ball – horn and synthesiser arrangements
- Alan Gorrie and Hamish Stuart – vocal arrangements

Production

- Producer: Dan Hartman
- Recorded at Sigma Sound Studios, New York
- Engineers: Mike Hutchinson, Jay Mark and Don Hartman
- Assistant Engineer: Glenn Rosenstein
- Additional Recording at The Schoolhouse, Westport
- Album Art Direction/Design: Mike Doud of Larchmont Photography
- Album Photography: Jules Bates of Artrouble
