= Show Your Hand (album) =

Studio album by Average White Band
- Released: 13 September 1973
- Recorded: November 1972 – April 1973
- Studio: RG Jones, London, UK
- Genre: Funk
- Length: 39:52
- Label: MCA
- Producer: Robin Turner, Average White Band

Average White Band chronology
Show Your Hand (1973)	AWB '74 (The White Album) (1974)

Alternative cover
- 1975 re-issue cover

Professional ratings
Review scores
Source	Rating
AllMusic (link)	3.5/5 stars
Christgau's Record Guide	B+

Show Your Hand is the debut album by Scottish funk band Average White Band, likely recorded at RG Jones Recording Studios, Wimbledon, London, and released in 1973 by MCA Records. After the success of AWB, the album was re-issued in 1975 with a new title, Put It Where You Want It, a different opening track and new cover artwork. The re-issued version finally made it to the Billboard Top 200, peaking at No. 39, and No. 69 in Canada.

== Track listing ==
Side one

1. "The Jugglers" (Alan Gorrie) – 4:55
2. "This World Has Music" (Bonnie Bramlett, Gorrie, Leon Ware) – 5:45
3. "Twilight Zone" (Roger Ball, Gorrie) – 5:12
4. "Put It Where You Want It" (Joe Sample, Gorrie, Layne) – 4:00

Side two

1. "Show Your Hand" (Gorrie) – 3:40
2. "Back in '67" (Ball, Gorrie, Robbie McIntosh) – 4:00
3. "Reach Out" (AWB, Ball) – 4:00
4. "T.L.C." (AWB, Gorrie) – 8:20

On the 1975 MCA re-issue the song "The Jugglers" is replaced by "How Can You Go Home".

== Personnel ==
Average White Band

- Malcolm Duncan – tenor saxophone
- Hamish Stuart – guitars, lead and backing vocals
- Onnie McIntyre – guitars, backing vocals
- Roger Ball – piano, clavinet, alto saxophone
- Alan Gorrie – bass, lead and backing vocals
- Robbie McIntosh – drums, percussion

Technical

- Nick Sykes – engineer
- John Pasche – design, artwork
