= All the Way =

All the Way may refer to:

== Film and television ==
- All the Way (1998 film), an Australian comedy directed by Marque Owen
- All the Way (2001 film), a film directed by Shi Runjiu
- All the Way (2016 film), an adaptation of Robert Schenkkan's play (see below)
- All the Way (TV series), a 1988 Australian television series
- All the Way... A Decade of Song (TV program), a 1999 American TV special by Celine Dion
- "All the Way" (Buffy the Vampire Slayer), a 2001 television episode
- "All the Way" (Happy Days), a 1974 television episode

== Literature ==
- All the Way (play), a 2012 play about U.S. President Lyndon B. Johnson by Robert Schenkkan
- All the Way, a novel by Andy Behrens, basis for the film Sex Drive

== Music ==
=== Albums ===
- All the Way (Allstar Weekend album) or the title song, 2011
- All the Way (Brenda Lee album), 1961
- All the Way (Calloway album) or the title song, 1989
- All the Way (Diamanda Galás album), 2017
- All the Way (Etta James album), 2006
- All the Way (Etta Jones album), 1999
- All the Way (Frank Sinatra album) or the title song (see below), 1961
- All the Way (Growing album), 2008
- All the Way... A Decade of Song, by Céline Dion, 1999
  - All the Way... A Decade of Song & Video, a video release by Céline Dion, 2001
- All the Way... and Then Some!, by Sammy Davis Jr., 1958
- All the Way, by Jimmy Scott, 1992

=== Songs ===
- "All the Way" (BigXthaPlug song), 2025
- "All the Way" (Craig David song), 2005
- "All the Way" (Eddie Vedder song), 2008
- "All the Way" (Frank Sinatra song), 1957, covered by many
- "All the Way" (Jason McCoy song), 1996
- "All the Way" (Timeflies song), 2014
- "All the Way", by !!! from As If, 2015
- "All the Way", by Blasted Mechanism, 2007
- "All the Way", by Busted from Busted, 2002
- "All the Way", by Jacksepticeye and the Gregory Brothers, 2016
- "All the Way", by Jackson Wang from Magic Man, 2022
- "All the Way", by Jeremih and Chance the Rapper from Merry Christmas Lil' Mama, 2016
- "All the Way", by Journey from Arrival, 2000
- "All the Way", by Kiss from Hotter Than Hell, 1974
- "All the Way", by Lonestar from Lonely Grill, 1999
- "All the Way", by Matt Brouwer from Where's Our Revolution, 2009
- "All the Way", by Mikuni Shimokawa, 2003
- "All the Way", by Nebula from Charged, 2001
- "All the Way", by New Order from Technique, 1989
- "All the Way", by Playa from Cheers 2 U, 1998
- "All the Way", by the Professionals from The Professionals, 1991
- "All the Way", by the Ramones from End of the Century, 1980
- "All the Way", by Ratt from Ratt, 1999
- "All the Way", by Reykon, the theme song for Univision's coverage of the 2015 CONCACAF Gold Cup
- "All the Way...", by Ladytron from Witching Hour, 2005
- "All the Way (Stay)", by Jimmy Eat World from Surviving, 2019

== See also ==
- "All the Ways", a 2019 song by Meghan Trainor
- All the Way Live, a 2000 album by Trouble Funk
- "All the Way Live", a 2018 song by the Go! Team from Semicircle
- All the Way Up (disambiguation)
- Go All the Way (disambiguation)
- Let's Go All the Way (disambiguation)
