= The Atlantic Family Live at Montreux =

Live album by Various Artists
- Released: 1978
- Recorded: 1977, Montreux, Switzerland
- Genre: Jazz
- Length: 73:25
- Label: Atlantic
- Producer: Arif Mardin

Professional ratings
Review scores
| Source | Rating |
|---|---|
| Allmusic (link) | 3/5 stars |

The Atlantic Family Live at Montreux is a live recording made at the 1977 Montreux Jazz Festival. It featured the Don Ellis Orchestra together with the Average White Band and guest musicians. It was originally released as a double album on vinyl.

== Track listing ==
LP1 side A

1. "Bahia (Na Baixa Do Sapateiro)" (16:32)

LP1 side B

1. "Jadoo" (10:34)
2. "Everything Must Change" (6:21)

LP2 side A

1. "McEwan's Export" (8:58)
2. "One To One" (9:10)

LP2 side B

1. "Pick Up the Pieces" (21:40)

== Personnel ==
- Ben E. King - lead vocals
- Sonny Fortune - alto sax
- David "Fathead" Newman - alto sax
- Roger Ball - alto sax
- Herbie Mann - flute
- Dick Morrissey - tenor sax
- Molly Duncan - tenor sax
- Klaus Doldinger - tenor sax
- Michael Brecker - tenor sax
- Jaroslav Jakubovic - saxophone
- Don Ellis - trumpet
- Gilman Rathel - trumpet
- Lew Soloff - trumpet
- Randy Brecker - trumpet
- Alan Kaplan - trombone
- Barry Rogers - trombone
- Richard Tee - electric piano
- Jim Mullen - guitar
- Hamish Stuart - guitar
- Rafael Cruz - percussion
- Sammy Figueroa - percussion
- Rubens Bassini - percussion
- Alan Gorrie - bass
- Steve Ferrone - drums
- Onnie McIntyre - guitar

Backing Vocals:

- Alfa Anderson
- Diane Sumler
- Diva Gray
- Krystal Davis
- Luther Vandross
- Peter Cox
- Robin Clark

Other credits:

- Engineer - Gene Paul
- Producer - Arif Mardin
