= Aftershock (Average White Band album) =

Studio album by Average White Band
- Released: 1989
- Label: Track
- Producer: John Robie

Average White Band chronology
Cupid's in Fashion (1982)	Aftershock (1989)	Soul Tattoo (1997)

Professional ratings
Review scores
Source	Rating
AllMusic	1/5 stars

Aftershock is an album by the R&B band Average White Band, released in 1989. Three original bandmembers returned; Alex Ligertwood joined on vocals. Chaka Khan sang on two of the album's songs. Track Records, the band's label, was unable to effectively promote Aftershock. The album was a moderate success in Europe.

== Track listing ==
1. "The Spirit of Love" (Alan Gorrie, Eliot Lewis) – 4:05
2. "Sticky Situation" (Gorrie, Matthew Noble, Kevin Calhoun) – 4:29
3. "Aftershock" (Gorrie, Dennis Lambert, Franne Golde) – 4:07
4. "Love at First Sight" (Billy Beck, Darwin Dortch, Glen Rupp, Rick Brown, F. Adams) – 4:47
5. "I'll Get Over You" (Gorrie, Noble, Calhoun) – 4:32
6. "Later We'll Be Greater" (Lewis, Roger Ball, John Robie) – 3:52
7. "Let's Go All the Way" (Gorrie, Lewis) – 5:53
8. "We're in Too Deep" (Gorrie, Lewis) – 3:54
9. "Stocky Sachoo-a-Shun" (Gorrie, Noble, Calhoun) – 1:38

== Personnel ==
- Alan Gorrie – Bass, Guitar, Keyboards, Vocals
- Onnie McIntyre – Guitar, Vocals
- Roger Ball – Saxophone, Synthesizer horns
- Alex Ligertwood – Lead and Background vocals
- Eliot Lewis – Keyboards, Programming, Guitar, Vocals, Drums, Percussion

Additional musicians

- Ronnie Laws – Soprano Saxophone
- Chaka Khan – Vocals
- Billy Beck – Keyboards
- Ohio Players – Background vocals and chorus
