= Cut the Cake (album) =

Studio album by Average White Band
- Released: June 10, 1975
- Recorded: November 1974 – March 1975
- Genres: Funk, soul
- Length: 42:02
- Label: Atlantic
- Producer: Arif Mardin

Average White Band chronology
AWB '74 (The White Album) (1974)	Cut the Cake (1975)	Soul Searching (1976)

Singles from Cut The Cake
- 1. "Cut The Cake" Released: March 25, 1975; 2. "If I Ever Lose This Heaven" Released: May 23, 1975; 3. "School Boy Crush" Released: September 23, 1975; 4. "Cloudy" Released: March 27, 1976

Professional ratings
Review scores
Source	Rating
Allmusic	3.5/5 stars
Christgau's Record Guide	C+

Cut the Cake is the third album released by Average White Band, released in 1975. The hit title track reached No. 10 on the Billboard pop singles chart. It was dedicated to "our friend and brother Robbie McIntosh".

== Recording notes ==
The follow-up album to the immensely successful AWB in 1974, recording was plagued by creative and artistic differences, with several members of the band walking out of the studio on three occasions. One point of conflict was the band's mourning for original drummer Robbie McIntosh, who died of a heroin overdose in 1974. Producer Arif Mardin considered pulling the plug on the project due to this tension but ultimately persevered and oversaw its completion.

== Track listing ==
Side A

1. "Cut the Cake" (Average White Band, Gorrie, McIntosh) – 4:07
2. "School Boy Crush" (Average White Band, Stuart, Ferrone, Gorrie) – 4:58
3. "It's A Mystery" (Stuart, Average White Band, McIntosh) – 3:34
4. "Groovin' the Night Away" (Average White Band, Stuart) – 3:42
5. "If I Ever Lose This Heaven" (Leon Ware, Pam Sawyer) – 5:00

Side B

1. "Why" (Ball, Stuart, Gorrie) – 3:57
2. "High Flyin' Woman" (Average White Band, McIntyre, Gorrie) – 3:47
3. "Cloudy" (Stuart, Gorrie) – 4:18
4. "How Sweet Can You Get" (Ball, Stuart, Gorrie) – 3:57
5. "When They Bring Down the Curtain" (Gorrie, Ball) – 4:42

== Personnel ==
Average White Band

- Alan Gorrie – vocals, bass, guitar on "Cut the Cake" and "School Boy Crush"
- Hamish Stuart – vocals, guitar, bass on "Cut the Cake" and "School Boy Crush"
- Roger Ball – keyboards, synthesizer, alto and baritone saxophones, arranger (Dundee horns)
- Malcolm Duncan – tenor saxophone
- Onnie McIntyre – guitar, backing vocals
- Steve Ferrone – drums, percussion

with:

- Ray Barretto – congas on "It's a Mystery" and "When They Bring Down the Curtain"

Technical

- Gene Paul – engineer, recording
- Neal Schwartz, Peter Granet – additional recording
- Bob Defrin – art direction
- Vincent Topazio – cover illustration

== Charts ==
Year	Chart positions		
Year	US	US R&B	Canada
1975	4	1	11

=== Singles ===
Year	Single	Chart positions			
Year	Single	US	US R&B	US Dance	UK
1975	"Cut the Cake"	10	7	13	31
1975	"If I Ever Lose This Heaven"	39	25	—	—
1975	"School Boy Crush"	33	22	—	—

== See also ==
- List of number-one R&B albums of 1975 (U.S.)
