= Permissive (film) =

1970 British film by Lindsay Shonteff

- Film Poster
- Directed by: Lindsay Shonteff
- Written by: Jeremy Craig Dryden
- Produced by: Jack Shulton
- Starring: Maggie Stride; Gay Singleton; Gilbert Wynne; Forever More
- Cinematography: John C. Taylor
- Edited by: Jackson Bowdell
- Music by: Forever More; Comus
- Production company: Shonteff Films
- Distributed by: Tigon Films
- Release date: 1970
- Running time: 90 minutes
- Country: United Kingdom
- Language: English

Permissive is a 1970 British exploitation drama film directed by Lindsay Shonteff and starring Maggie Stride, Gay Singleton and Gilbert Wynne. It was written by Jeremy Craig Dryden, and depicts a young girl's progress through the rock music groupie subculture of the time.

== Plot ==
Suzy arrives in London with nowhere to stay. She meets a friend, Fiona, a groupie who has settled into a relationship with Lee, bass player and singer with the band Forever More. At first Suzy is just one of many girls who follow the groups and make themselves sexually available to musicians and their hangers-on (a type represented by Forever More's road manager Jimmy). When the band go on tour she is left behind. For some time she lives on the streets with Pogo, a gentle hippie drifter who is eventually killed in a road accident.

After the accident Suzy meets Fiona again. She becomes accepted as part of Forever More's entourage, and develops the glamorous style and hard attitude of an experienced groupie. She makes a play for Lee and ousts Fiona from her status as his 'old lady.' As the band are about to leave their hotel and move on, Suzy finds Fiona lying in the bath with her wrists slashed, barely alive. They lock eyes unsmiling, and Suzy walks out and shuts the door.

== Cast ==
- Maggie Stride as Suzy
- Gay Singleton as Fiona
- Gilbert Wynne as Jimmy
- Alan Gorrie as Lee, Forever More
- Stuart Francis as Kip, Forever More
- Mick Travis as Mick, Forever More
- Onnie Mair as Onnie, Forever More
- Debbie Bowen as Lacy
- Robert D'Aubigny as Pogo
- Titus Groan as themselves
- Stuart Cowell as Nick, Titus Groan
- Nicola Austine as Coral
- Nicole Yearne as groupie
- Suzy Randall as groupie
- Juliet Adams as groupie
- Linda Dean as groupie
- Greta Nelson as groupie
- Maria Vasilou as groupie
- Sussana East as groupie
- Cathy Howard as groupie
- Samantha Bond as groupie
- Maria Frost as groupie
- Louisa Livingstone as groupie
- Madeleine Collinson as groupie
- Mary Collins as groupie
- John Allen as roadie
- Eric Simpson as roadie
- Joyce Crossley as woman
- C. Reeves as technician
- Bill Hibbert as policeman
- N. Tathan as policeman

== Production ==
Forever More were a genuine performing band, although the band members play characters other than themselves in the film. Songs from the soundtrack appear on their 1970 album Yours – Forever More. Alan Gorrie went on to commercial success as a member of the Average White Band.

The cult folk band Comus provided the film's opening title theme and other incidental music and songs.

== Reception ==
The Monthly Film Bulletin wrote: "This curiously elliptical account of a groupie's life involves a dispirited road manager, a singularly uninspiring group, an endless succession of anaemic groupies, and a drop-out who announces that "the world is my scene, man" before being arbitrarily knocked down by a truck. The actors do what they can with a thin script, while director Lindsay Shonteff resorts to a frantic series of flashbacks and flashes forward – one shot is repeated at least six times. But his pyrotechnics merely succeed in emphasising the inordinate foolishness of the whole enterprise." Kine Weekly wrote: "Because of its background (and foreground) of pop music this film is slanted towards a young audience that its X certificate, quite rightly, legally debars from seeing. It has a sort of semi-documentary atmosphere, particularly in the flatness of the dialogue and the smallness of the acting. In particular Maggie Stride in the central role of Suzy seems to specialise in a colourless discontent. Gay Singleton shows more life as Fiona, but the men in the story are shadowy characters."

In Offbeat: British Cinema's Curiosities, Obscurities and Forgotten Gems, Gary Ramsay wrote: "Of interest to musicologists and cineastes alike, Permissive is a compelling, if grubby, portrayal of London life and the underground music scene, as the 1960s hippy dream dissolved into the troubled murk of the 1970s. Known at various times as Suzy Superscrew and The Now Child, even the gloss of a recent high definition DVD makeover by the BFI (under its admirable Flipside programme), can't disguise the coating of grime covering Lindsay Shonteff's cautionary tale of sexploitation and pub rock."

== Home media ==
Permissive was released on DVD and Blu-ray in the UK as part of the BFI's Flipside series on 25 January 2010. The disc also includes the feature film Bread (Stanley Long, 1971) and the short 'Ave You Got a Male Assistant Please Miss? (Graham Jones, Jon Astley, 1973).
