= Cut the Cake =

Cut the Cake may refer to:

- "Cut the Cake" (song), a 1975 hit for Average White Band
- Cut the Cake (album), an album by Average White Band
- Cut the Cake (horse), a racehorse who won the New Zealand Derby in 2003
