= The Senate (band) =

Scottish white soul cover band

The Senate was a Scottish white soul cover band active in Europe in the mid-late 1960s. This group included the now late drummer Robbie McIntosh, who would later be a member of The Average White Band, Alex Ligertwood who went on to a successful career that included vocal work for Santana and saxophonist Robert Mather who later immigrated to Canada and eventually founded Superior Emergency, a successful fire truck manufacturing company. Jim McAra, another Scottish guitarist/singer, who became a founder member of the Dundee-based band. Mafia, joined the Senate in 1968.

The Senate released four LPs including Sock It to You One More Time and one recording on RCA Italia titled Piper Club Dance, which were distributed in Europe and Latin America (but not in the United States). The cover art of this album featured Italian actress Mita Medici.

The Senate was also the backup band for Big Maybelle, when she toured the United Kingdom in late 1960s.

They were also the 'touring' band for Garnet Mimms, and recorded a live album at the Club AGoGo Newcastle, which featured the hit song, "As Long As I Have You", released in 1967.
