= Freelandia =

Counter culture US air travel club (1973–1974)

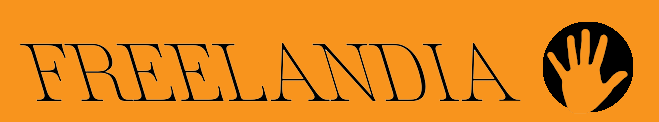
- Freelandia logo (reconstructed)
IATA	ICAO	Call sign
FR	FRL	FREELANDIA
- Commenced operations: September 18, 1973
- Ceased operations: April 1974
- Fleet size: 1 Douglas DC-8-20
- Destinations: Newark; Los Angeles
- Headquarters: Los Angeles, California; United States
- Founder: Kenneth Moss

Freelandia was a counter-culture air travel club that operated for about seven months starting September 1973. Air travel clubs were a non-profit membership form of air transport that side-stepped regulation by the Civil Aeronautics Board (CAB), the now-defunct Federal agency that, at the time, provided tight economic regulation of most US air transportation. Freelandia passengers were obliged to become members as well as pay for tickets. Freelandia operated a single Douglas DC-8 in a striking dark-yellow livery. Poor revenue resulted in cessation of operations in April 1974 after its aircraft was repossessed for non-payment of rent. Oddly, the DC-8 was Freelandia's second aircraft, the first was a Convair 880 that it never operated.

The club, and its founder, Kenneth Moss, came in for heavy criticism when it was discovered Moss had arranged matters so he'd make a substantial profit if Freelandia succeeded. Freelandia and Moss were later charged with false advertising and fraudulent business practices by the State of California. In early 1976, Moss was convicted of involuntary manslaughter for the drug death of drummer Robbie McIntosh during a September 1974 party at Moss's home.

See External links for photos of Freelandia's aircraft.

== History ==
Company founder Kenneth Moss made $1.5 million in the stock market before he was 26 (equivalent to $13,200,000 in 2025). He invested $1.15 million (equivalent to $8,300,000 in 2025) of his own funds into the company, and received operational certification from the Federal Aviation Administration (FAA) on August 7, 1973. The company was founded as a non profit; Moss said income in excess of operating costs would be donated to worthy causes such as free clinics, free schools, and artists. To avoid CAB regulation, it was structured as an air travel club, with members voting on where the company's planes would fly. The club was based in Los Angeles's Sherman Oaks neighborhood. The company said that it had obtained landing rights in Hong Kong, Yugoslavia, and South America.

Its one DC-8-21 was painted entirely in a semi-dark yellow with a waving hand as its logo on the tail. It was equipped with 149 seats with first class leg room and a 7-seat lounge that would allow the passengers to mingle. Freelandia claimed the aircraft was six years old; it was, in fact, first delivered in 1960, making it 13 years old. Many of the seats were later removed and replaced with pillows with seat belts. It was decorated in what the company described as a "far-out chocolate-and-cream color". In-flight service offered organic food, rock music, and a waterbed. Entertainment options included books, chess, video games, and a pinball machine. All of the company's flight personnel had at least 10,000 hours flight experience. The company planned to add additional aircraft to its fleet every time the membership increased by 8,000.

Fares were announced as $69 from Honolulu to San Francisco, $12.50 from San Francisco to Los Angeles, $69 from Los Angeles to New York, and $100 from New York to Brussels. Accessing those fares required club membership, with an annual fee of $50 for adults and $25 for kids under 12. The advertised fares were about $30 cheaper than other airlines for the flight from San Francisco to Honolulu, and about $200 less than usual for flights from the West Coast to Brussels. The company stated three thousand people had signed up with the club before its first flight. Its first flight took place on September 18, 1973, from San Francisco to Honolulu.

== Demise ==
Operations ended within a year of its creation due to low sales. In November 1973, overseas flights were scrapped because the company could not fill the flights. In April 1974, the company's aircraft was repossessed by the leasing company for non-payment. It flew an estimated 40 or 50 flights, mostly coast to coast, only once to Europe, before operations ceased, but interest from members wasn't enough to fill the flights to make them profitable. Despite saying that flights to Hawaii would occur three times per month, it only flew there twice and the second time it had trouble obtaining fuel for the return flight.

In late 1974, the company and its founder were charged in a civil suit by the State of California for false advertising and fraudulent business practices. While the company had been set up as a non-profit business, the founder also set up three other for-profit corporations that were paid by the company to perform various services. Rolling Stone claimed that the founder stood to make several million dollars from the venture.

In 1976, Moss settled the suit for $60,000, but paid no money because his net worth was listed as less than $1,000.

== Moss scandal ==
After Freelandia airline operations ceased, founder Kenneth Moss was implicated in the death of Robbie McIntosh, drummer of the Average White Band. Moss was charged with murder and unlawfully providing narcotics during a party at his home in September 1974. He pleaded guilty to involuntary manslaughter and was sentenced to 120 days in jail and four years' probation. Moss served three months at a Malibu work farm.

== Fleet ==
- 1 Convair 880 (not operated)
- 1 Douglas DC-8-21

== See also ==
- List of defunct airlines of the United States
- Air travel club
