= Gene Paul =

Recording engineer

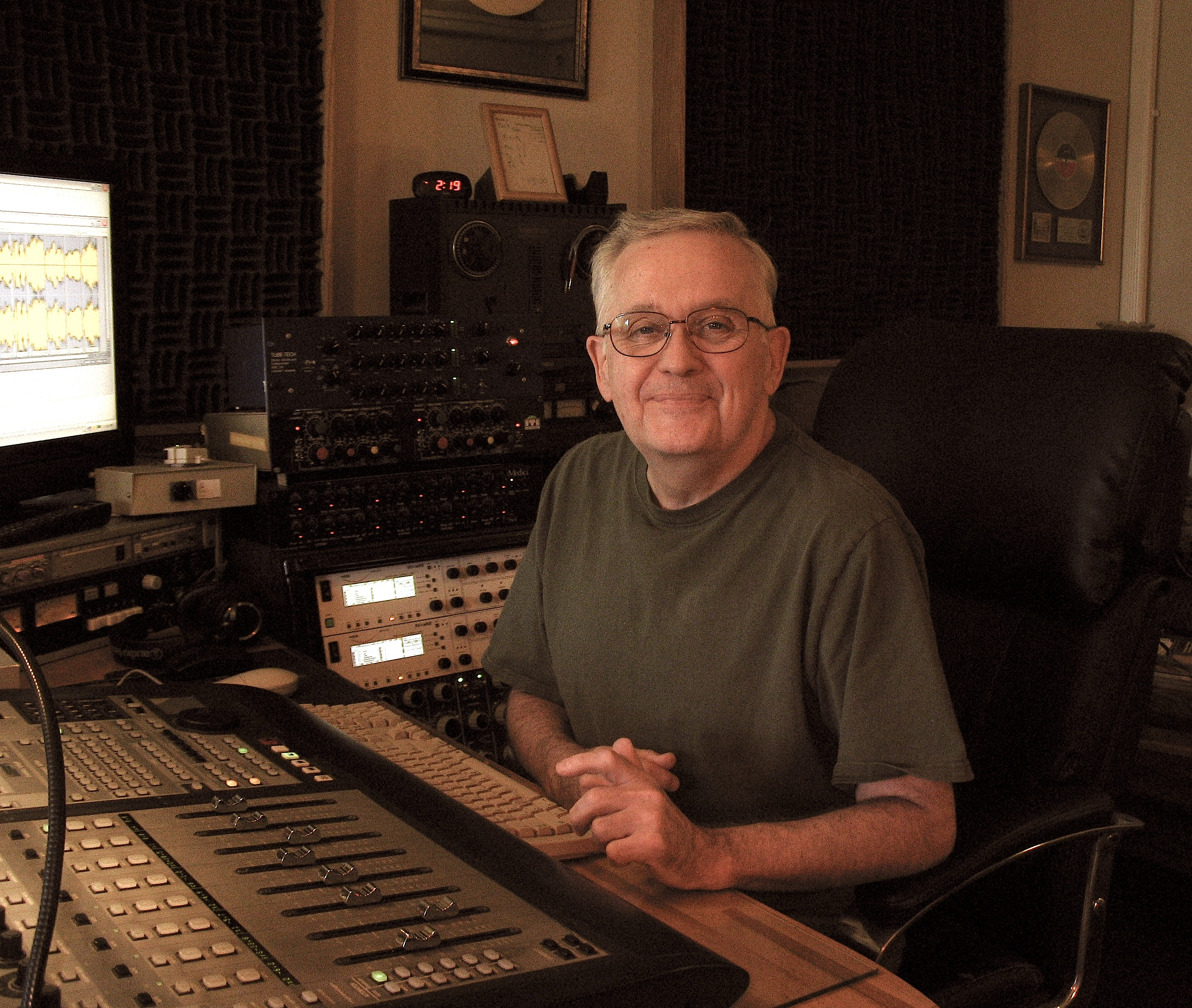
- Gene Paul at G&J Audio in 2012

Background information
- Born: August 20, 1944 (age 81); Hollywood, California, U.S.
- Occupations: Audio recording / mixing / mastering engineer, producer and musician
- Instrument: Drums
- Years active: 1959–present
- Website: www.gandjaudio.com

Gene William Paul (born August 20, 1944) is an American audio recording / mixing / mastering engineer, producer and musician. He was an engineer at Atlantic Recording Studios during their famed 1960s–80s period and is currently the chief mastering engineer at G&J Audio, a mixing and mastering studio for major and independent labels focused on reissues and new recordings. He has worked on thousands of projects, and has engineered 9 Grammy Award-winning albums with 29 total nominations in 15 different categories. He has engineered many hit recordings, including 7 #1's on the Billboard National Charts, 6 #1's on the Pop Charts, 10 #1's on the Jazz Charts and 5 #1's on the R&B Charts.

== Early years ==
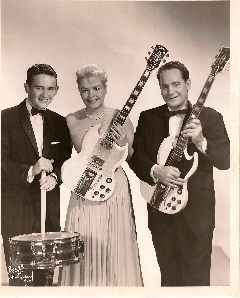
Gene Paul, Mary Ford & Les Paul in the mid-1960s

Gene Paul is the son of the guitarist and inventor Les Paul, the inventor of the solid-body electric guitar and early innovator of multitrack recording. Gene spent his youth developing his engineering skills in the family recording studio and spent a decade as the drummer in his father's touring band from 1959 to 1969, with singer Mary Ford (his stepmother) for the first half. "Without even knowing it, I was being taught about presenting music, which was a great experience. I worked on putting the shows together with dad. I watched him record his own music as well as groups. If he said, 'Do you want to know about this?' I'd say, 'Yes.' And I'd go set up a mic. By the time I grew up, I knew how to record."

== Atlantic Records ==
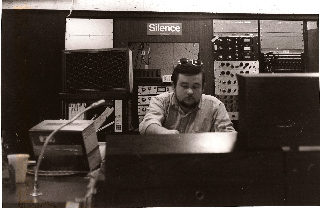
Gene Paul at Atlantic Records in the 1970s

His career took off after joining Atlantic Records in 1969 where he quickly became a world-renowned engineer and producer. "The people there, like Tom Dowd, Arif Mardin, Joel Dorn, Ahmet Ertegun, they were all gentle people. You would think that they were all superstars, but they never acted that way. Being at Atlantic was like being welcomed into someone's house. It was a house of music. You never knew who was going to come in, one day Aretha [Franklin], the next The Modern Jazz Quartet, King Curtis, Gladys Knight. ... It was truthfully hard to go home at night."

== Mastering ==
In the 1980s, Paul began working with Atlantic Records producer Joel Dorn and Atlantic Records engineer Joel Kerr to restore and remaster the recordings of rare live performances by famous artists. This led Paul & Kerr to form DB Plus Digital Services, an independent mastering studio which operated in New York City from 1987 to 2009. In 2010, he became Chief Mastering Engineer at G&J Audio, a mixing and mastering studio for major and independent labels focused on reissues and new recordings, alongside Kerr and engineer Jamie Polaski.

== Grammy Awards ==
Gene Paul has engineered 9 Grammy Award-winning albums with 29 total nominations in 15 different categories. (Years listed are album release dates.)

Year	Artist	Album	Label	Producer	Category	Role
1970	Aretha Franklin	Don't Play That Song	Atlantic Records	Arif Mardin, Jerry Wexler, Tom Dowd	WINNER: Best R&B Vocal Performance, Female	Recording Engineer
1971	Aretha Franklin	"Bridge Over Troubled Water" (single)	Atlantic Records	Arif Mardin, Jerry Wexler, Tom Dowd	WINNER: Best R&B Vocal Performance, Female	Recording Engineer
1971	Aretha Franklin	Young, Gifted and Black	Atlantic Records	Arif Mardin, Jerry Wexler, Tom Dowd	WINNER: Best R&B Vocal Performance, Female	Recording Engineer
1973	Roberta Flack	Killing Me Softly	Atlantic Records	Joel Dorn	WINNER: Record of the Year	Recording Engineer
1973	Roberta Flack	"Killing Me Softly with His Song" (single)	Atlantic Records	Joel Dorn	WINNER: Best Pop Vocal Performance, Female	Recording Engineer
1974	Average White Band	AWB	Atlantic Records	Arif Mardin	Best R&B Instrumental Performance (for "Pick Up the Pieces")	Recording Engineer
1975	Average White Band	Cut the Cake	Atlantic Records	Arif Mardin	Best R&B Vocal Performance, Male (for "Cut the Cake")	Recording Engineer
1978	Average White Band	Warmer Communications	Atlantic Records	Arif Mardin	Best R&B Instrumental Performance (for "Sweet & Sour")	Recording Engineer
1995	John Coltrane	Heavyweight Champion: The Complete Atlantic Recordings	Rhino Records	Joel Dorn	Best Historical Album	Mastering Engineer
1997	Various Artists	Cuba: I Am Time	Blue Jackel Entertainment	Jack O'Neil	Best Historical Album	Mastering Engineer
1997	Various Artists	Cuba: I Am Time	Blue Jackel Entertainment	Jack O'Neil	Best Boxed or Special Limited Edition Package	Mastering Engineer
1998	Arkadia Jazz All Stars	Thank You, John! Our Tribute to John Coltrane	Arkadia Jazz	Bob Karcy	Best Jazz Instrumental Solo (soloist: David Liebman)	Mastering Engineer
1998	Arkadia Jazz All Stars	Thank You, Gerry! Our Tribute to Gerry Mulligan	Arkadia Jazz	Bob Karcy	Best Jazz Instrumental Solo (soloist: Randy Brecker)	Mastering Engineer
1998	Benny Golson	Tenor Legacy	Arkadia Jazz	Bob Karcy	Best Jazz Instrumental Solo (for "Body and Soul")	Mastering Engineer
1999	Joanne Brackeen	Pink Elephant Magic	Arkadia Jazz	Bob Karcy	Best Jazz Instrumental Solo (for "In Vogue")	Mastering Engineer
2000	Bobby Sanabria	Afro-Cuban Dream... Live & in Clave!!!	Arabesque Recordings	Bobby Sanabria	Best Latin Jazz Album	Mastering Engineer
2003	Shirley Horn	May the Music Never End	Blue Note Records	Shirley Horn	Best Jazz Vocal Album	Mastering Engineer
2003	Kurt Elling	Man in the Air	Blue Note Records	Bill Traut	Best Jazz Vocal Album	Mastering Engineer
2004	Norah Jones	Feels Like Home	Blue Note Records	Norah Jones, Arif Mardin	WINNER: Best Female Pop Vocal Performance (for "Sunrise")	Mastering Engineer
2004	Maria Schneider Orchestra	Concert in the Garden	ArtistShare	Maria Schneider	WINNER: Best Large Jazz Ensemble Album	Mastering Engineer
2005	Rick Moranis	The Agoraphobic Cowboy	WEPI / ArtistShare	Tony Scherr	Best Comedy Album	Mastering Engineer
2005	John Hollenbeck Large Ensemble	A Blessing	Omnitone Records	John Hollenbeck	Best Large Jazz Ensemble Album	Mastering Engineer
2005	Various Artists	Songs from the Neighborhood: The Music of Mister Rogers	Nostalgia Records	Dennis Scott	WINNER: Best Musical Album for Children	Mastering Engineer
2007	Maria Schneider Orchestra	Sky Blue	ArtistShare	Maria Schneider	WINNER: Best Instrumental Composition (for "Cerulean Skies")	Mastering Engineer
2007	Maria Schneider Orchestra	Sky Blue	ArtistShare	Maria Schneider	Best Large Jazz Ensemble Album	Mastering Engineer
2007	Bobby Sanabria	Big Band Urban Folktales	Jazzheads	Bobby Sanabria	Best Latin Jazz Album	Mastering Engineer
2009	Leslie Mendelson	Swan Feathers	Rykodisc	Joel Dorn	Best Engineered Album, Non-Classical	Mastering Engineer
2011	Fred Hersch	Alone at the Vanguard	Palmetto	Fred Hersch	Best Improvised Jazz Solo (for "Work")	Mixing & mastering engineer
2011	Various Artists	All About Bullies... Big and Small	Cool Beans Music	Steve Pullara	Best Musical Album for Children	Mastering Engineer

== Recordings ==
In addition to the Grammy Awards listed above, Gene Paul has engineered many hit recordings, including 7 #1's on the Billboard National Charts, 6 #1's on the Pop Charts, 10 #1's on the Jazz Charts and 5 #1's on the R&B Charts.

Year	Artist	Album	Chart Position	Role
1961	Eddie Harris	"Exodus" (single)	#16 R&B, #36 US	Remastering Engineer
1968	Eddie Harris	"It's Crazy" (single)	#88 US	Remastering Engineer
1969	Eddie Harris & Les McCann	Swiss Movement	#1 Jazz, #2 R&B, #29 US	Remixing & Remastering Engineer
1969	R.B. Greaves	R.B. Greaves	#24 R&B, #85 US	Mixing Engineer
1971	Eddie Harris & Les McCann	Second Movement	#1 Jazz, # 41 US	Recording and Remastering Engineer
1971	Les McCann	Invitation to Openness	#8 Jazz	Remastering Engineer
1971	Donny Hathaway	Donny Hathaway	#6 R&B, #89 US	Recording Engineer
1972	Roberta Flack & Donny Hathaway	Roberta Flack & Donny Hathaway	#3 US, #2 R&B, #10 Jazz	Recording Engineer
1972	Cream	Live Cream Volume II	#27 US	Remixing Engineer
1972	Herbie Mann	Hold On, I'm Coming	#7 Jazz	Mixing Engineer
1973	Bette Midler	Bette Midler	#6 US	Recording Engineer
1973	Hall & Oates	Abandoned Luncheonette	#33 US	Recording Engineer
1973	Willie Nelson	Shotgun Willie	#41 US	Recording Engineer
1973	Les McCann	Layers	#5 Jazz	Remastering Engineer
1973	Modern Jazz Quartet	Blues on Bach	#34 Jazz	Recording and Mixing Engineer
1973	Donny Hathaway	Extension of a Man	#18 R&B, #69 US	Recording Engineer
1973	Bee Gees	Mr. Natural	#178 US	Recording Engineer
1974	Modern Jazz Quartet	The Complete Last Concert	#34 Jazz	Mixing Engineer
1976	The Rolling Stones	Black and Blue	#1 US	Recording Engineer
1976	Willie Nelson	The Troublemaker	#1 Country, #60 US	Recording Engineer
1977	Ben E. King	Benny & Us	#14 R&B, #33 US	Recording Engineer
1979	Bette Midler	Thighs and Whispers	#65 US	Recording Engineer
1983	Paul Simon	Hearts and Bones	#35 US	Recording Engineer
1993	David "Fathead" Newman	Bigger & Better	#10 Jazz, #42 R&B	Remastering Engineer
1998	Various Artists	Jazz for the Open Road	#1 Jazz	Mastering Engineer
1998	Various Artists	Jazz for the Quiet Times	#1 Jazz	Mastering Engineer
1999	Various Artists	Jazz for When You're Alone	#1 Jazz	Mastering Engineer
1999	Various Artists	Jazz for a Lazy Day	#4 Jazz	Mastering Engineer
2000	Various Artists	Jazz for a Rainy Afternoon	#1 Jazz	Mastering Engineer
2000	Jane Monheit	Never Never Land	#2 Jazz	Mixing & Mastering Engineer
2000	Various Artists	Jazz for When You're in Love	#9 Jazz	Mastering Engineer
2001	Jane Monheit	Come Dream with Me	#1 Jazz	Mixing & Mastering Engineer
2002	Jane Monheit	In the Sun	#2 Jazz	Recording, Mixing & Mastering Engineer
2003	Various Artists	Jazz for Those Peaceful Moments	#4 Jazz	Mastering Engineer
2007	Mocean Worker	Cinco de Mowo!	#16 Electronic	Mastering Engineer
