= Let's Go All the Way =

Let's Go All the Way may refer to:

- Let's Go All the Way (Sly Fox album), 1985
  - "Let's Go All the Way" (Sly Fox song), the title song
- "Let's Go All the Way", a song by Average White Band from Aftershock
- Let's Go All the Way (Norma Jean album), 1964
  - "Let's Go All the Way" (Norma Jean song), the title song
- "Let's Go All the Way", a song by Raydio from Raydio
- "Let's Go All the Way", a song by React

== See also ==
- Go All the Way (disambiguation)
