= Burning for Buddy: A Tribute to the Music of Buddy Rich, Vol. 2 =

Studio album by various drummers with the Buddy Rich Big Band
- Released: June 24, 1997
- Recorded: May 1994; May 20, 1996
- Studios: Power Station, New York City; Electric Lady, New York City
- Genre: Big band
- Length: 71:43
- Label: Atlantic
- Producer: Neil Peart

Burning for Buddy tribute chronology
Burning for Buddy: A Tribute to the Music of Buddy Rich (1994)	Burning for Buddy: A Tribute to the Music of Buddy Rich, Vol. 2 (1997)

Professional ratings
Review scores
Source	Rating
Allmusic	(link)

Burning for Buddy: A Tribute to the Music of Buddy Rich, Vol. 2 is a 1997 Buddy Rich tribute album produced by Rush drummer/lyricist Neil Peart. It is a follow-up to 1994's Burning for Buddy: A Tribute to the Music of Buddy Rich and both recording sessions were also released in a 5-hour documentary DVD video in 2006, The Making of Burning for Buddy....

== Track listing ==
1. "Moment's Notice" – 3:31
  Drums performed by Steve Smith
2. "Basically Blues" – 6:08
  Drums performed by Steve Gadd
3. "Willowcrest" – 4:51
  Drums performed by Bill Bruford
4. "In a Mellow Tone" – 6:17
  Drums performed by Gregg Bissonette
5. "Time Check" – 3:47
  Drums performed by Dave Weckl
6. "Goodbye Yesterday" – 6:15
  Drums performed by Simon Phillips
7. "Groovin' Hard" – 5:29
  Drums performed by David Garibaldi
8. "Big Swing Face" – 4:27
  Drums performed by Kenny Aronoff
9. "Standing up in a Hammock" – 2:54
  Drums performed by Marvin "Smitty" Smith
10. "Take the "A" Train" – 6:11
  Drums performed by Joe Morello
11. "One O'Clock Jump" – 7:46
  Drums performed by Neil Peart
12. "Them There Eyes" – 2:33
  Drums performed by Steve Arnold
13. "Channel One Suite" – 11:34
  Drums performed by Buddy Rich
