= Blues on Bach =

Studio album by Modern Jazz Quartet
- Released: 1974
- Recorded: November 26–27, 1973
- Studios: Atlantic Recording Studios, New York City
- Genre: Jazz
- Length: 41:27
- Labels: Atlantic; QD 1652
- Producer: Nesuhi Ertegun

Modern Jazz Quartet chronology
In Memoriam (1974)	Blues on Bach (1974)	The Last Concert (1975)

Milt Jackson chronology
In Memoriam (1974)	Blues on Bach (1974)	Goodbye (1974)

Professional ratings
Review scores
Source	Rating
Allmusic	4/5 stars
The Penguin Guide to Jazz Recordings	3.5/4 stars
The Rolling Stone Jazz Record Guide	3/5 stars

Blues on Bach is an album by the American jazz group the Modern Jazz Quartet recorded in 1973 and released on the Atlantic label. The album includes five arrangements by John Lewis of pieces by Johann Sebastian Bach, interspersed with four original blues pieces "on" [the name] "Bach"—in keys (and with titles) that spell out in order the name B-A-C-H.

The five pieces arranged from Bach originals are: "Regret?" from chorale prelude "The Old Year Has Now Passed Away"; "Rise Up in the Morning" from the 140th cantata "Sleepers Wake"; "Precious Joy" from the 147th cantata "Jesu, Joy of Man's Desiring"; "Don't Stop This Train" from the fugue by Johann Peter Kellner BWV Anh. 180 wrongly attributed to Bach; and "Tears from the Children" from the Prelude 8 in E♭ minor from Book I of "The Well-Tempered Clavier".

For the four blues pieces, the "spelling" of the titles follows the system Bach and his German contemporaries used, in which the letter B indicates B♭, and the letter H is B♮. So, the four blues pieces that spell the name B-A-C-H are in the keys of B♭ (major), A (minor), C (minor) and B (major).

== Reception ==
The Allmusic review stated "This album has an interesting concept, alternating four original blues with five adaptations of melodies [sic] from classical works by Bach. The Modern Jazz Quartet had long been quite adept in both areas, and despite a certain lack of variety on this set (alternating back and forth between the two styles somewhat predictably), the music is largely enjoyable".

== Track listing ==
1. "Regret?" (based on Bach) – 2:04
2. "Blues in B Flat" (John Lewis) – 4:56
3. "Rise Up in the Morning" (Bach) – 3:28
4. "Blues in A Minor" (Lewis) – 7:53
5. "Precious Joy" (Bach) – 3:12
6. "Blues in C Minor" (Milt Jackson) – 7:58
7. "Don't Stop This Train" (Bach) – 1:45
8. "Blues in H (B)" (Jackson) – 5:46
9. "Tears from the Children" (Bach) – 4:25

== Personnel ==
The Modern Jazz Quartet

- Milt Jackson – vibraphone
- John Lewis – piano, harpsichord
- Percy Heath – bass
- Connie Kay – drums

Production

- Nesuhi Ertegun – producer
- Gene Paul – engineer (recording, mixing)
- Buddy Endress – photography
