= Jaroslav Jakubovič =

Czech jazz saxophonist and composer

- Birth name: Jaroslav Jakubovič
- Born: 1948; Czechoslovakia
- Genres: Jazz
- Occupation(s): saxophonist, composer, record producer
- Instrument(s): Baritone saxophone, flute, clarinet
- Years active: 1970s–present
- Labels: Columbia Records, VMM Records
- Website: facebook.com/jaroslav.jakubovic1

Audio sample
- "Good Old Days" from Coincidence (2009): file; help

Jaroslav Jakubovič (born 1948) is a Czech-born Israeli jazz saxophonist, composer and record producer.

== Biography ==
Born in Czechoslovakia, Jakubovič emigrated to Israel, via Switzerland in 1968, as a result of the Warsaw Pact invasion of Czechoslovakia. He then enrolled at Berklee College of Music, where he studied composition and arranging. He then married and moved to New York City, where he was signed by the prestigious label Columbia Records. Jakubovič was particularly active as a session musician in New York in the 1970s and worked with such prominent musicians as Paul Simon, the Jackson 5, Bette Midler, Ray Charles, Lionel Hampton and Buddy Rich.

He returned briefly to the Czech Republic in 1998, at the invitation of President Havel, but returned properly only in 2009 to play at the Usti International Jazz and Blues Festival.

In 1985, he recorded the instrumental album Waiting For Messiah featuring jazz adaptations of the songs of Shalom Hanoch. The album was re-issued in 2009. In 2000 he moved back to New York and established a jazz-folk ensemble playing original compositions and covers of well-known songs. His 2009 album Coincidence was recorded with such well-known jazz musicians as Randy Brecker and Adam Nussbaum.

In 2010, Jakubovič appeared at the Red Sea Jazz Festival alongside his son Daniel on guitar.

In February 2015, Jakubovič performed the world premier of Sara and Avraham, his concerto for saxophone, piano and symphony orchestra, with the Prague Symphony Orchestra at the Smetana Hall in Prague. The programme for the concert, which was held under the auspices of Gary Koren, Ambassador of Israel in the Czech Republic, also included Jakubovič's variations on Porgy and Bess by George Gershwin, and featured Czech pianist Emil Viklický and conductor Elli Jaffe.

== Reception ==
Reviewing the 2009 album Coincidence for DownBeat magazine, Shaun Brady said:

The music that Jakubovic has penned for the album also maintains a pop accessibility throughout, with strong grooves and vivid melodies that almost cry out for lyrics to sing along with. (Though the two cuts that do feature vocals are both digressions—" "New York Blues" is just that, a straightforward blues belted by Broadway vet Ula Hedwig, and "Gaudeamus Igitur" is a curious swingvocal arrangement of the old Latin graduation song, too precious by far.) Sixties soul-jazz is the well from which Jakubovic draws his strongest inspiration, the most obvious touchstone being Cannonball Adderley’s Zawinul-era output. The gospel-tinged pining of "Mercy, Mercy, Mercy" is evoked several times, most notably on the wistful "Good Ol’ Days," which spotlights the fluttery suppleness of the leader’s bari playing. "Say What?" is a fairly conscious echo of "Compared to What" while "Bouncing Czech Dobry" is a Lee Morgan-style burner.

== Discography ==
=== As leader/co-leader ===
- 1978: Checkin' In – with Ralph MacDonald, Hugh McCracken, Buddy Williams, Pat Rebillot, and Jon Faddis, among others (Columbia)
- 1979: Blast – Blast with John Scofield and Ula Hedwig (Columbia JC 36012)
- 1997: Sax (Israeli Love Without Words) (SISU Home Entertainment), reissued 2007
- 1998: Sax 2 (Israeli Love Without Words), reissued 2008
- 2009: Coincidence – with Randy Brecker, Phil Markowitz, Adam Nussbaum, George Mraz, Tom "Bones" Malone and Ula Hedwig (VMM Records: VMM02)
- 2010: Skylight: Extreme World Fusion (VMM Records: VMM04) (all songs written and arranged by Jaroslav Jakubovic)

=== As sideman ===
- 1974: Bill Watrous – Manhattan Wildlife Refuge – Bill Watrous (Columbia KC 33090)
- 1975: Bill Watrous and the Manhattan Wildlife Refuge – (Columbia PC 33701)
- 1976: Majesty Music – Miroslav Vitouš (Artista)
- 1977: Herbie Mann & Fire Island – Herbie Mann & Fire Island (Atlantic SD 19112)
- 1978: Boys in the Trees – Carly Simon (Elektra 6E-128)
- 1978: Live at Montreux – The Atlantic Family (Atlantic SD 2–3000)
- 2005: Losing Time – Daniel J
- 2012: Live At Last – Bette Midler (Friday Music FRM-29000)

=== Compilations ===
- 2003: Muzicã De Relaxare 3 (with Francisco Garcia (guitar) and Stefan Nicolai (panpipes): Albert Hit Factory – 0010308–4, cassette, Romania)
