= Cut the Cake (song) =

Single by Average White Band

from the album Cut the Cake
- B-side: "Person to Person"
- Released: March 25, 1975
- Genre: Funk
- Length: 3:34 (single version): 4:09 (album version)
- Label: Atlantic
- Songwriter(s): Average White Band
- Producer(s): Arif Mardin

Average White Band singles chronology
"Pick Up the Pieces" (1974)	"Cut the Cake" (1975)	"If I Ever Lose This Heaven" (1975)

"Cut the Cake" is a song written and performed by Average White Band. It was featured on their 1975 album Cut the Cake. The song was arranged by Roger Ball and produced by Arif Mardin.

The song nominated for the Grammy Award for Best R&B Performance by a Duo or Group with Vocals at the 1976 Grammy Awards, but it lost to "Shining Star" by Earth, Wind & Fire.

== Chart performance ==
"Cut the Cake" reached No. 7 on the U.S. R&B chart, No. 10 on the U.S. pop chart, No. 13 on the U.S. dance chart, No. 16 in Canada, and No. 31 on the UK Singles Chart in 1975. The song ranked No. 71 on Billboard magazine's Top 100 singles of 1975 and No. 151 on the Canadian year-end chart.

AWB re-released the song in 1986 where it reached No. 34 on the U.S. R&B chart and No. 45 on the UK Singles Chart.

== Other versions ==
- Jeff Golub released a version of the song on the 2002 various artists album KKSF 103.7 - Sampler 13: Smooth Jazz.

== Sampling ==
- AWB's version was sampled by Chill Rob G on his 1989 song "Dope Rhymes" from the album Ride the Rhythm.
