= All the Way (1998 film) =

- Directed by: Marque Owen
- Written by: Marque Owen
- Starring: André Eikmeier; Bronwyn Jones; Matt Boesenberg
- Production company: Fresh Films Productions
- Distributed by: Beyond Films
- Release date: 1998
- Running time: 81 mins
- Country: Australia
- Language: English

All the Way is a 1998 Australian comedy film about friends who decide to make a pornographic movie. The movie was independently funded and picked up for distribution by Beyond.
