= Eliot Lewis =

American rock, R&B and soul singer

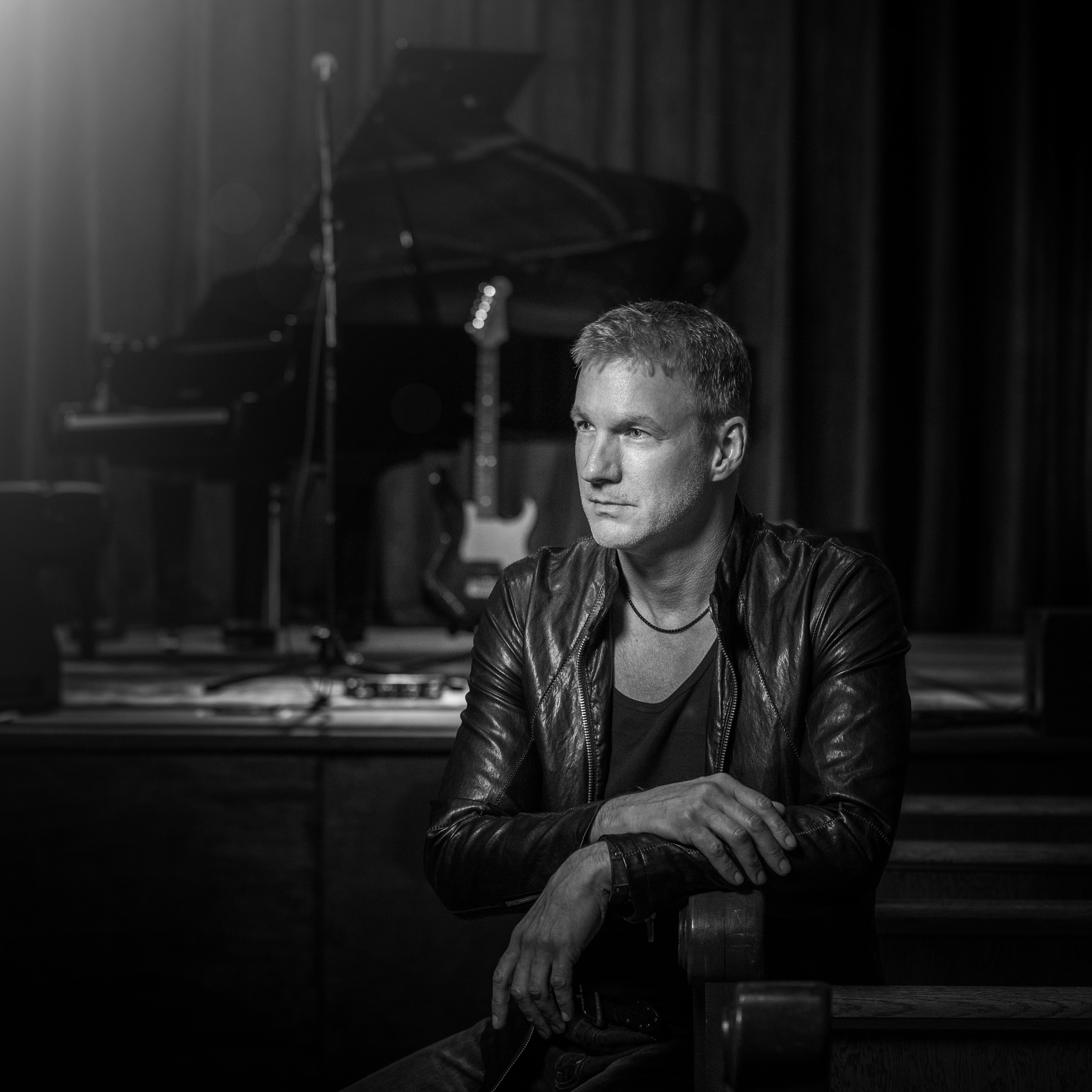
- Eliot Lewis in 2020

Background information
- Born: March 10, 1962 (age 64)
- Origin: Norwalk, Connecticut, United States
- Genres: Soul; R&B; pop rock
- Instruments: Vocals; guitar; keyboards
- Years active: 1989–present
- Website: Official website

Eliot Lewis (born March 10, 1962) is an American rock, and soul singer, multi-instrumentalist and solo artist. He is best known for his work with Average White Band (1989–2002) and Hall & Oates (2003–2023). Lewis was the original featured musician on Live from Daryl's House, an Internet-based show hosted by Daryl Hall that now can be seen on its popular YouTube channel. In addition, Lewis maintains his own successful solo career as well as a prolific output of music.

== Early career ==
Lewis grew up in Norwalk, CT, the youngest of three children, in what he describes as a very musical environment. Although his mother was a classical pianist, Lewis’ first instrument was the drums, which he discovered at age 10. When he was 12 years old, he formed his first band, Take Off, with three childhood friends. Richard Totoian, the father of Take Off's bass player Kevin Totoian, worked for several major record labels and was instrumental in exposing young Eliot to many of the artists of the day, including The Who, Elton John, and Alice Cooper. He even arranged a jam session for the boys at his house with Peter Frampton.

At age 16, Lewis picked up the guitar and began writing his own songs. A few years later, recognizing technology's potential impact on music, he taught himself keyboards and bass, and learned to program synthesizers. Today, Lewis plays five instruments, and is a completely self-contained songwriter and musician.

In his early 20s, Lewis was introduced to Dan Hartman, a singer, songwriter, and record producer responsible for hits such as "Free Ride," "Relight My Fire," and "I Can Dream About You." Lewis began working with Hartman, collaborating on music for some of the day's top stars and working on albums like Joe Cocker’s Unchain My Heart and Tina Turner’s Simply the Best.

A few years later, Lewis signed his first publishing deal with Sony Tunes, where he collaborated with many other songwriters, including Porter Carroll Jr. of the band Atlantic Starr. After several years with Sony, Lewis signed with Warner Chappell Music, then produced a number of releases for RCA.

== Average White Band ==
In the late 1980s, Lewis met Alan Gorrie, one of the founders of the Scottish R&B group Average White Band. AWB had disbanded in 1983, but Lewis and Gorrie began writing together. Lewis wrote a number of songs, including "Spirit of Love," and when AWB reformed in 1989 to record AfterShock, Gorrie asked Lewis to play on the album and co-produce it. Lewis became an official member of AWB when the record was complete. He spent 13 years in AWB, playing guitar, bass, and keyboards, and singing lead vocals on hits including "School Boy Crush" and "Walk On By".

Lewis left AWB in 2002 to focus on his own music.

== Hall and Oates ==
A little more than a year after leaving AWB, Lewis got a call from singer and songwriter Daryl Hall, whom he'd met through Gorrie. Hall needed a keyboard player for a short tour supporting some new solo material, and Lewis agreed to join him. At the end of the tour, Lewis was invited to be a permanent member of both Hall's solo band and the Daryl Hall and John Oates band. He has been with both groups longer than any member except Hall, Oates, saxophonist Charlie DeChant, and bassist/guitarist T-Bone Wolk.

As a member of the Hall & Oates band, Lewis has played some of the world's most famous venues, including the Hollywood Bowl and Japan's Budokan Arena. He has also performed on popular television shows such as "The Voice," "Late Night with Conan O'Brien," and "Jimmy Kimmel Live." Lewis appeared with the Hall & Oates band in the 2010 feature film You Again He played with the Live From Daryl's House band on the anchor float in the Pasadena Tournament of Roses Parade in 2014, and with the Hall & Oates band at the 2014 Rock and Roll Hall of Fame induction ceremony.

In April 2023, Lewis announced his departure from both bands to focus on his own music.

== Live from Daryl's House ==
Live from Daryl's House is a critically acclaimed webcast started by Hall in late 2007. The show features Hall and his band, including Lewis, playing live, unrehearsed songs with guest artists such as veterans Smokey Robinson, Todd Rundgren, and Rob Thomas, and new acts like Fitz and the Tantrums, the Dirty Heads, and JOHNNYSWIM.

Lewis is the only member of the Live from Daryl's House band (besides Hall himself) who has played on every episode. While he generally is on keyboards, Lewis has played guitar on several songs; LFDH episode 63, with ZZ Top’s Billy Gibbons, features several guitar solos by Lewis. He played bass on episode No. 18 with The Doors' Robby Krieger and Ray Manzarek.

Along with his departure from the Hall & Oates band, Lewis announced his plans to depart Live from Daryl's House to pursue his solo career.

== Solo artist ==
In addition to working with other artists, Lewis has recorded and independently released seven solo CDs. Lewis plays all the instruments and sings backup and harmonies.

The title song from his first CD, "Get Back What You Give," released in 2000, earned Lewis an award in the John Lennon Songwriting Contest.

His CD, "Live And Up Front," released in November 2013, is his first live recording, and includes songs played during solo dates in Ohio.

In August 2014, Lewis debuted his latest studio CD, an EP titled "Crusade.”

Lewis frequently takes his one-man act on the road, playing clubs, festivals, and intimate venues around New England and parts of the Midwest. His performances focus mostly on his own material, but include tunes from AWB and Hall & Oates, plus some of his favorites songs from artists he has worked with on Live From Daryl's House. While touring the country with Hall & Oates, Lewis occasionally plays solo gigs after the band's shows, with bandmates sometimes joining him on stage.

In January 2015, Lewis released his first music video, "Crusade," directed and produced by Jay Johnson and Ronald Michael, from the CD "Crusade."

In 2022, Lewis collaborated with Big Scenic Nowhere for their cover of the Hall & Oates song "Sara Smile".

== Influences ==
Lewis describes his current style as influenced by classic rock, soul, funk, and blues. Musicians who influenced his musical style include Jeff Beck, Jimmy Page, John Bonham, Jack Bruce, Stevie Wonder, and Billy Preston.

He also lists the late musician Tom Wolk as a personal influence. Lewis describes Wolk, longtime band member and musical director for Hall and Oates, as "an amazing person to be around, and not just a very nice guy, he was a masterful musician."

== Photography ==
Besides being an accomplished musician, Lewis is recognized as a talented photographer. He has documented his travels with Hall & Oates, shooting landscapes of places the band has played, backstage scenes, and portraits of band members and audiences. His work has been showcased in several New England galleries, and featured on album covers and in Hall & Oates’ promotional materials.

Lewis became interested in photography as a teen and worked in a photo-processing lab before breaking into the music business. He shot occasionally while with AWB, but took up photography again in earnest when he joined Hall & Oates. In 2003, Hall invited Lewis to bring his camera to a video session for the duo's album Our Kind of Soul. Lewis took a few candid shots, one of which became the cover of the album. Since then, Lewis has taken photos for the band's promotional materials and shot the cover of Hall's 2010 solo release Laughing Down Crying.

== Brazil ==
In June 2014, Lewis gave his first international interview to Brazil, for the journalist Brina Guglielmo. The interview was given and published in the newspaper "Tribuna Popular," a local newspaper of the city of Pinhalzinho, São Paulo, Brazil.

== The White House ==
In March 2015, Lewis was in The White House with President Barack Obama and First Lady Michelle Obama. In his own words: "This is definitely one of the highlights of my career. Thank you Daryl & John for giving me this experience and so happy to have shared it with this amazing band."

== Solo albums ==
=== Standing On Top of the World (2006) ===
1. Standing On Top of the World
2. Cloud No. 9
3. Never Tell Me
4. Innocent (Instrumental)
5. Hello It's Me (Todd Rundgren cover)
6. History
7. The Island (Instrumental)
8. I'll Try
9. Future Plans (Instrumental)
10. Over And Out

=== 6 and One (2010) ===
1. Galaxy Quest
2. Adventure
3. Jetstream (Instrumental)
4. She's Gone (Hall & Oates cover song)
5. Truth (Instrumental)
6. Love Don't Lie
7. Lost
8. Helpless (Instrumental)
9. Get Back What You Give
10. Go Ahead (Instrumental)

=== Enjoy The Ride (2012) ===
1. Determination
2. One Life
3. Dirty (Instrumental)
4. Start to Finish
5. Enjoy The Ride (Instrumental)
6. Soul of the City
7. House on the Corner of the Block
8. Innocence (Instrumental)
9. Highway
10. Earth And Back (Instrumental)

=== Live And Up Front (2013) ===
1. Introduction (featuring Corrie Lewis)
2. Never Tell Me
3. Determination
4. Adventure
5. Enjoy The Ride (Instrumental)
6. Live And Learn
7. One Life
8. Soul of the City
9. Helpless (Instrumental)
10. Get Back What You Give
11. Lost

=== Crusade (2014) ===
1. Crusade
2. Soundtrack
3. Sonic Soldier (instrumental)
4. History
5. Back to Basics
