= Go All the Way =

Go All the Way may refer to:

- "Go All the Way" (song), a 1972 song by the Raspberries
- Go All the Way (The Isley Brothers album), 1980, or the title song
- Go All the Way (China album), 1991
- Go All the Way, a 1981 album by Kojo
- Goin' All the Way! (1981) film
- Going All the Way (1997) film

== See also ==
- Let's Go All the Way (disambiguation)
