= Robbie McIntosh (drummer) =

Scottish drummer (1950-1974)

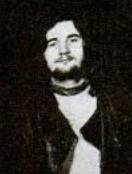
- McIntosh in 1974

Background information
- Born: Robert Broderick James McIntosh; 6 May 1950; Dundee, Scotland
- Died: 22 September 1974 (aged 24) Los Angeles, California, U.S.
- Instrument: Drums
- Years active: 1965–1974
- Formerly of: The Senate; Average White Band; Chuck Berry

Robert Broderick James McIntosh (6 May 1950 – 22 September 1974) was a Scottish drummer from Dundee who was a founder-member of the Average White Band (AWB).

== Early life ==
His father was Bonar Sullivan, better known as Bonar Colleano, an American-born actor (whose family were circus entertainers from Australia with Aboriginal and Irish roots), who had a successful career in films, especially in the UK. Colleano was not married to Robbie's mother, as he got her pregnant while he was filming near an army base in Dundee, and thus he was given his mothers surname.

McIntosh was raised in Broughty Ferry and later in West End. He was raised by his grandmother and aunt. He started drumming as a teenager while attending Harris Academy.

== Career ==
By the time he was fifteen or sixteen, McIntosh was gigging in clubs. He had been a member of the late 1960s bands the Senate with Alex Ligertwood, and Mal and the Primitives, followed by Brian Auger's Oblivion Express, appearing on the band's early albums Oblivion Express (1971), Better Land (1971) and Second Wind (1972). He also recorded two tracks that appear on the Herbie Mann album London Underground (1973).

In late 1971, McIntosh joined Average White Band, with Alan Gorrie, Michael Rosen (who soon left), Molly Duncan, Onnie McIntyre, and Roger Ball. Despite forming in London, all of its members are Scottish. A year later, he and McIntyre recorded the drums and guitar on "My Ding-a-Ling" for Chuck Berry.

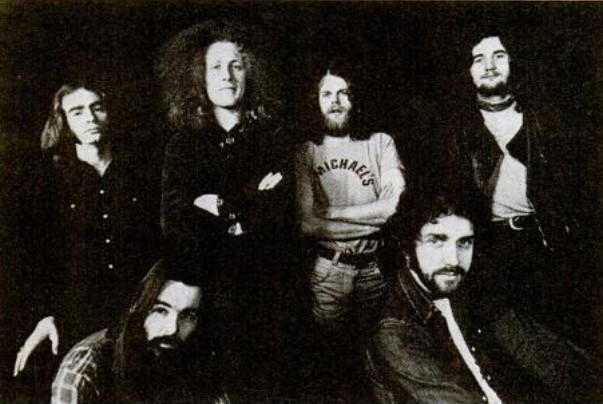
McIntosh (top right) with the Average White Band in 1974.

The Average White Band are best known for their 1974 instrumental "Pick Up the Pieces", which was recorded and released before McIntosh's death, however initially failed to crack the UK charts; a month after McIntosh died, the bands second album, AWB, which featured the song, was released in America, where it topped the charts, and soon after had a resurgence in Britain, peaking at number six. Gorrie recalled: "I remember the day when we got the news that the single and album were both number 1 on the Billboard Chart. We were stationed in a mansion called MACH 2, by the water in Long Island, which belonged to Ahmet Ertegun, the head of Atlantic Records. We all lived there and had a room set up with all our gear where we wrote the bulk of Cut The Cake. It was a weird moment to celebrate this success, considering that Robbie had died only five months previously. So it was a slightly hollow feeling."

== Personal life ==
At the time of his death, McIntosh was married to Edith St. Louis, who was nicknamed "Didi", whose parents were part of the Windrush generation. They had one son, Brandon.

== Death ==
McIntosh died of an accidental heroin overdose at a party following a concert at the Troubadour in Los Angeles. According to a contemporary report in Time, McIntosh and fellow band member Alan Gorrie took what they thought was cocaine, but was in fact heroin laced with morphine. Gorrie was saved by the intervention of fellow party-goer Cher, who kept him conscious long enough to recover. The party host, Kenneth Moss, a 30-year-old millionaire who founded the short-lived airline Freelandia, was subsequently indicted for murder by a grand jury. Moss pleaded guilty to involuntary manslaughter and was sentenced to 120 days in jail and four years' probation.

McIntosh is buried in Barnhill Cemetery, Dundee. His replacement as drummer in the AWB was Steve Ferrone, previously of Bloodstone, who had replaced McIntosh before in Brian Auger's Oblivion Express.

In January 1975, the band played a benefit show for McIntosh's widow, Edith, at the Marquee Club in London. According to Edith, she was so traumatised by his death, she moved to Spain in order to immserse herself in a new culture and language, saying "I didn’t want to speak English again, I went to a country where I didn’t understand anyone, and no one understood me", but eventually moved back to Dundee.

In 2024, Edith released the book Pick Up The Pieces, an autobiography about her grief and the celebration of McIntosh's life.

== Discography ==
With Brian Auger's Oblivion Express

- A Better Land (1971)
- Brian Auger's Oblivion Express (1971)
- Second Wind (1972)

With Chuck Berry

- The London Chuck Berry Sessions (1972)

With Average White Band

- Show Your Hand (1973)
- AWB (1974)

With Herbie Mann

- London Underground (1974)
