= All the Way Up (disambiguation) =

"All the Way Up" is a 2016 single by Fat Joe and Remy Ma.

All the Way Up may also refer to:

- All the Way Up (film), a 1970 British comedy film
- "All the Way Up" (Emily Osment song), a 2009 single
