= Pick Up the Pieces (Average White Band song) =

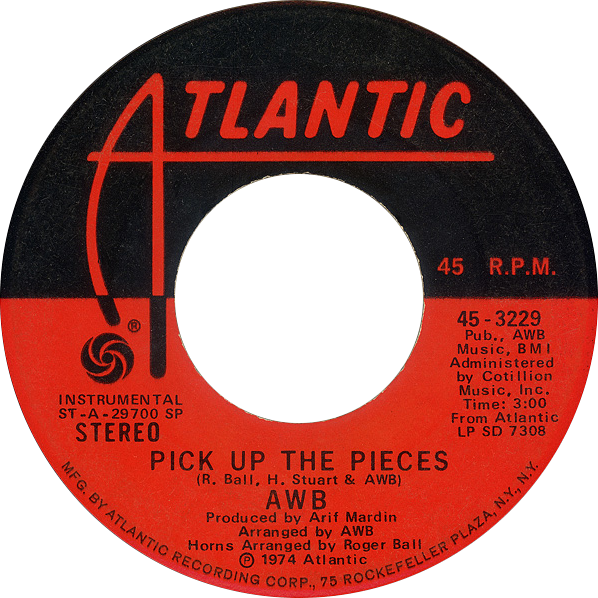
- Side A of the American single

Single by Average White Band

from the album AWB
- B-side: "Work to Do"
- Released: July 1974
- Genre: Funk; disco; R&B
- Length: 3:59 (album version); 3:00 (single version)
- Label: Atlantic
- Songwriters: Roger Ball, Malcolm Duncan, Alan Gorrie, Onnie McIntyre, Hamish Stuart, Robbie McIntosh
- Producer: Arif Mardin

Average White Band singles chronology
"Put It Where You Want It" (1974)	"Pick Up the Pieces" (1974)	"Cut the Cake" (1975)

Official audio
- "Pick Up the Pieces" on YouTube

Alternative release
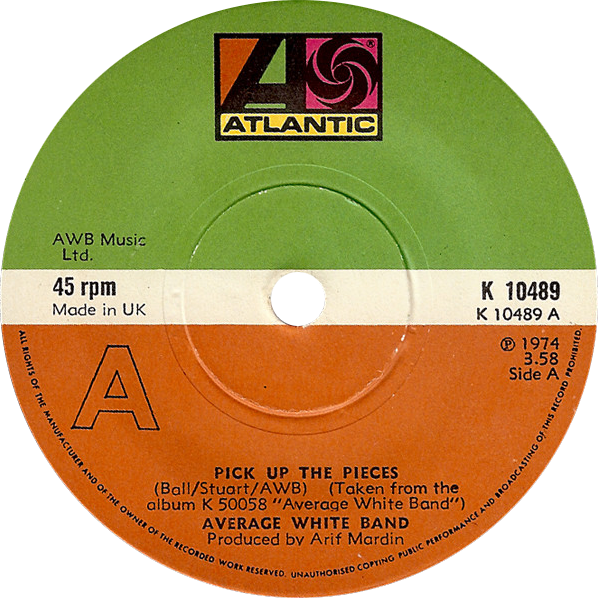
- Side A of the British single

"Pick Up the Pieces" is a song by the Average White Band from their second album, AWB. On the single, songwriting credit was given to founding member and saxophonist Roger Ball and guitarist Hamish Stuart individually and the entire band collectively. It is essentially an instrumental, apart from the song's title being shouted at several points in the song.

== Background ==
The guitar line of the song came from Hamish Stuart, while Roger Ball wrote the first part of the horn melody. The song was produced by Arif Mardin. According to Malcolm 'Molly' Duncan, he had disagreed with releasing the song as a single because the song is a "funk instrumental played by Scotsmen with no lyrics other than a shout". He also said about the shouts of "Pick up the pieces": "It's about picking yourself up when things aren't going well. We'd spent a lot of time making no money whatsoever, so it felt very relevant."

The song was included as an extended long version on the live Person to Person album (1976) (18:06) and on the various artists albums The Atlantic Family Live at Montreux (1977) (21:40) and Burning for Buddy: A Tribute to the Music of Buddy Rich (1994) (5:38). The tenor saxophone solo on the Montreux version is by Michael Brecker. The solo on the original release is by Molly Duncan.

== Chart performance ==
"Pick Up the Pieces" was released in the United Kingdom in July 1974 but failed to chart. When the album was released in the United States in October 1974, radio stations there started to play the song, and on 22 February 1975, it went to the top of the US pop singles chart and peaked at number five on the soul charts. Billboard ranked it as the No. 21 song for 1975. In Canada, it reached number 4 on the weekly charts, and number 44 on the year-end chart. After its North American success, the song charted in the UK and climbed to number six. "Pick Up the Pieces" also made it to number eleven on the US disco chart.

== Certifications ==
Region	Certification	Certified units/sales
United Kingdom (BPI)	Silver	200,000^{‡}
United States (RIAA)	Gold	1,000,000^{^}
^{^} Shipments figures based on certification alone.^{‡} Sales+streaming figures based on certification alone.
