= Average White Band =

Scottish rhythm and blues band

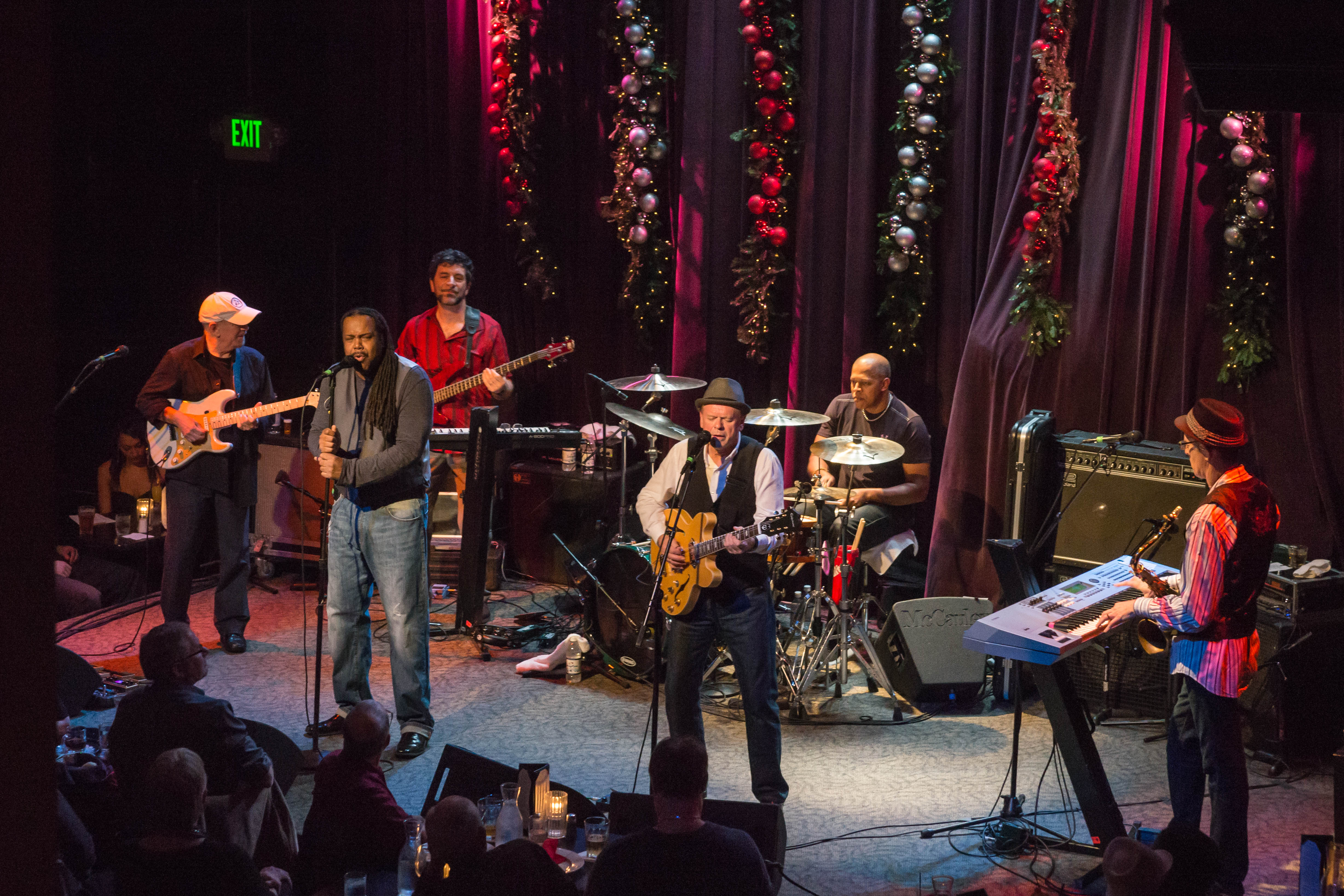
- Average White Band in 2013

Background information
- Also known as: AWB
- Origin: Dundee, Scotland
- Genres: Blue-eyed soul, funk, R&B, soft rock
- Years active: 1971–1983, 1989–2024
- Labels: Atlantic, RCA, MCA, Rhino, Arista
- Spinoffs: The 360 Band
- Past members: Alan Gorrie; Onnie McIntyre; Fred Vigdor; Cliff Lyons; Rocky Bryant; Brent Carter; Rob Aries; Roger Ball; Malcolm "Molly" Duncan; Robbie McIntosh; Michael Rosen; Hamish Stuart; Steve Ferrone; Eliot Lewis; Alex Ligertwood; Tiger McNeil; Peter Abbott; Fred "Catfish" Alias; Adam Deitch; Brian Dunne; Klyde Jones; Morris Pleasure; Monte Croft

The Average White Band (also known as AWB) were a Scottish funk and R&B band that had a series of soul and disco hits between 1974 and 1980. They were best known for their million-selling instrumental track "Pick Up the Pieces", and their albums AWB and Cut the Cake. The band name was initially proposed by Bonnie Bramlett. They have influenced others, such as the Brand New Heavies, and been sampled by various musicians, including the Beastie Boys, Public Enemy, TLC, the Beatnuts, Too Short, Ice Cube, Eric B. & Rakim, Nas, A Tribe Called Quest, Christina Milian, and Arrested Development, making them the 15th most sampled act in history.

== Career ==
=== Formation ===
AWB was formed in late 1971 in London by Alan Gorrie, and Malcolm "Molly" Duncan, with Owen "Onnie" McIntyre, Michael Rosen (trumpet), Roger Ball, and Robbie McIntosh joining them in the original line-up. Hamish Stuart quickly replaced Rosen. Duncan and Ball, affectionately known as the Dundee Horns, studied at Duncan of Jordanstone College of Art (now part of the University of Dundee, but which at the time was part of the Dundee Institute of Art and Technology, now known as Abertay University), and were previously members of Mogul Thrash. Gorrie and McIntyre had been members of Forever More. McIntyre and McIntosh were used as session musicians on Chuck Berry's recording of "My Ding-a-Ling".

According to Duncan, members of the band had played together before in Scotland, but had moved to London separately and met up by chance at a Traffic concert. They decided to jam together; a friend, Bonnie Bramlett, heard them and remarked: "This is too much for the average white man," which became adapted as the name of the band.

=== Breakthrough ===
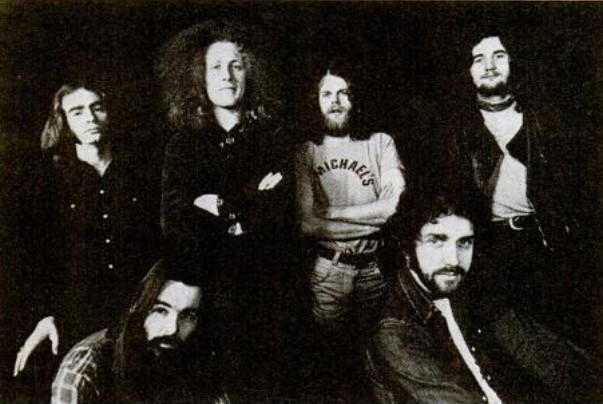
The band in 1974. Top row, left to right: Onnie McIntyre, Hamish Stuart, Alan Gorrie, Robbie McIntosh. Bottom row, left to right: Roger Ball, Molly Duncan.

The band's breakthrough was a support slot at Eric Clapton's comeback concert in 1973. MCA Records released their debut album, Show Your Hand (1973), which sold poorly. Bruce McCaskill, who was Clapton's tour manager, liked the band's music and agreed to manage them. He borrowed money to take them to the US and to promote them. McCaskill had many contacts from his days with Clapton and managed to get Atlantic Records to sign them. The band relocated to Los Angeles and released the follow-up, AWB, better known as The White Album. It reached No. 1 and was the first of many with producer Arif Mardin.

McIntosh died of a heroin overdose at a Los Angeles party on 23 September 1974. Gorrie also overdosed, but Cher kept him conscious until medical help arrived. The NME reported in January 1975 that AWB played a benefit show for McIntosh's widow at the Marquee Club in London. McIntosh was replaced by Steve Ferrone, previously of Bloodstone, who had replaced McIntosh before in Brian Auger's Oblivion Express.

In 1975, the single "Pick Up the Pieces", taken from the No. 1 AWB album, reached No. 1 on the US Billboard Hot 100 chart. The song knocked Linda Ronstadt's "You're No Good" out of No. 1 and sold over one million copies. It was awarded a gold disc by the R.I.A.A. in March 1975. It also prompted The J.B.'s, James Brown's backup band, to record and release a song in reply, "Pick Up the Pieces, One by One", under the name AABB (Above Average Black Band). It was both a tribute to AWB's knowledge of funk and a tongue-in-cheek play on the Scottish band's name.

AWB followed up with the LPs Cut the Cake (1975) and Soul Searching (1976), both big sellers and yielding further Top 40 singles. Cut the Cake was dedicated by the surviving band members to McIntosh's memory. A double live album Person To Person was issued in late 1976. Their next LP, Benny & Us, was a collaboration with Ben E. King.

=== Later career ===
After several more albums, Warmer Communications (1978), Feel No Fret (1979) and after a switch to the U.S. Arista label, Shine (1980) and Cupid's in Fashion (1982), AWB's audience and sales dwindled. The group initially disbanded by 1983. Their 1980 disco hit "Let's Go Round Again" (UK No. 12), was covered in the late 1990s by Louise.

Ferrone went on to work with Duran Duran and later with Tom Petty and The Heartbreakers from 1994 until Petty's death in 2017. Hamish Stuart joined Paul McCartney's touring group. In 1985 Gorrie released a solo album, Sleepless Nights.

The classic lineup of Gorrie, McIntyre, Ball, Stuart, Duncan and Ferrone reunited for one last time at the Atlantic Records 40th Anniversary in 1988. Gorrie, McIntyre, and Ball then continued in 1989 to record Aftershock. Alex Ligertwood (ex-Santana, Jeff Beck Group and another veteran of Brian Auger's Oblivion Express) also appeared on this album, replacing lead singer Hamish Stuart, along with Eliot Lewis who co-wrote with Gorrie and joined the band. Ligertwood left after the album's recording and drummer Tiger McNeil joined for the reunited band's live shows. McNeil was with the group until 1994. He was then succeeded by Peter Abbott (ex-Blood, Sweat & Tears), who in turn was replaced by Fred "Catfish" Alias in September 1998. Drummer Adam Deitch did a two-year stint with AWB from 1999 to 2001.

Average White Band has continued recording (1997's Soul Tattoo, 1999's Face to Face) and touring since. Ball worked on Soul Tattoo with the group but was replaced by Fred Vigdor (aka Freddy V.) in 1996.

Brian Dunne took over the drum chair in 2001 and when Eliot Lewis left the band in September 2002 to pursue other musical opportunities (including a stint with Hall and Oates), he was replaced by Klyde Jones.

Their line-up as of 2002 became Alan Gorrie (bass guitar, guitar, lead and backing vocals), Klyde Jones (keyboards, bass guitar, guitar, lead and backing vocals), Onnie McIntyre (guitar, vocals), Freddy V (sax, keyboards, vocals), and Brian Dunne (drums).

Dunne was replaced by Rocky Bryant as drummer as of the 2006 tour. After Jones left in 2011 to join Hall and Oates, Monte Croft (keyboards, bass, guitar) and former Earth, Wind & Fire member Morris Pleasure (keyboards, bass, guitar) came in to do brief stints before Rob Aries arrived in 2013.

Brent Carter (ex-Tower of Power) has been singing with AWB since 2011.

In July 2015, Malcolm 'Molly' Duncan, Steve Ferrone and Hamish Stuart reunited to form The 360 Band. This is in essence one half of the classic AWB. They released an album titled Three Sixty in 2017 and performed live together along with supporting musicians. As of 2019, Alan Gorrie and Onnie McIntyre are the only two original members left in the Average White Band.

Original tenor sax player Molly Duncan died on 8 October 2019, shortly after it had been announced that he had been diagnosed with terminal cancer.

In June 2023, AWB announced their final tour, Let's Go Round Again One Last Time. "That it's finally coming to an end is going to mean a highly emotional tour next year, but one which will mean we bow out at the top level," Gorrie said. "Please join us in a final celebration of that journey, and to a last hurrah of epic proportions with your presence and your aye-ready appreciation!"

The final concert was made into a concert film titled Final Note, released in 2025.

== Members ==
Final members

- Alan Gorrie – bass, guitars, vocals, keyboards (1971–1982, 1989–2024)
- Owen "Onnie" McIntyre – guitars, backing vocals (1971–1982, 1989–2024)
- Fred Vigdor – tenor saxophone, keyboards, backing vocals (1996–2024)
- Rocky Bryant – drums (2006–2024)
- Brent Carter – vocals (2011–2024)
- Rob Aries – keyboards, bass (2013–2024)
- Cliff Lyons – alto saxophone (2015–2024)

Former members

- Roger Ball – alto saxophone, keyboards (1971–1983, 1989–1996)
- Malcolm "Molly" Duncan – tenor saxophone (1971–1983; died 2019)
- Robbie McIntosh – drums (1971–1974; his death)
- Michael Rosen – trumpet, guitar (1971)
- Hamish Stuart – guitar, bass, vocals (1971–1983)
- Steve Ferrone – drums (1974–1983)
- Eliot Lewis – keyboards, guitar, bass, percussion, vocals (1989–2002)
- Tiger McNeil – drums (1989–1994)
- Alex Ligertwood – vocals (1989; died 2026)
- Peter Abbott – drums (1994–1998)
- Fred "Catfish" Alias – drums (1998–1999)
- Adam Deitch – drums (1999–2001)
- Klyde Jones – keyboards, guitar, bass, vocals (2002–2011)
- Morris Pleasure – keyboard, bass, guitar (2011, 2013)
- Monte Croft – keyboard, bass, guitar (2011–2013)

== Discography ==
=== Studio albums ===
Year	Title	Peak chart positions					Certifications
Year	Title	UK	AUS	US	US R&B	CAN	Certifications
1973	Show Your Hand	—	—	39 (Note: Charted in 1975 when re-issued as Put It Where You Want It.)	39	69	
1974	AWB	6	22	1	1	2	RIAA: Gold; BPI: Silver
1975	Cut the Cake	28	71	4	1	11	RIAA: Gold
1976	Soul Searching	60	81	9	2	20	RIAA: Platinum
1977	Benny & Us (with Ben E. King)	—	—	33	14	—	
1978	Warmer Communications	—	85	28	12	31	RIAA: Gold
1979	Feel No Fret	15	99	32	30	86	BPI: Silver
1980	Shine	14	—	116	38	—	
1982	Cupid's in Fashion	—	—	—	49	—	
1989	Aftershock	—	—	—	69	—	
1997	Soul Tattoo	—	—	—	—	—	
2003	Living in Colour	—	—	—	—	—	
2018	Inside Out	—	—	—	—	—	
"—" denotes releases that did not chart or were not released in that territory.

=== Live albums ===
Year	Title	Peak chart positions	
Year	Title	US	US R&B
1976	Person to Person (double album)	28	9
1999	Face to Face	—	—
2006	Soul & the City	—	—
2011	Live at Montreux 1977 (recorded at the Montreux Jazz Festival, 10 July 1977)	—	—
2013	Times Squared (recorded at B. B. King's, New York, NY, 18 March 2009)	—	—
2015	Access All Areas (recorded at Nottingham's Theatre Royal, summer 1980)	—	—
2016	AWB R&B	—	—
2024	Live At The Rainbow Theatre 1974	—	—
"—" denotes releases that did not chart or were not released in that territory.

=== Compilation albums ===
Year	Title	Peak chart positions		Certifications
Year	Title	UK	US	Certifications
1980	Volume VIII (contains 5 hits and 4 unreleased songs)	—	182	
1992	Pickin' Up The Pieces: The Best of Average White Band	—	—	
1994	The Best Of The Average White Band - Let's Go Round Again	38	—	BPI: Silver
1997	Pick Up The Pieces and Other Hits	—	—	
2005	Greatest & Latest	—	—	
2006	The Very Best Of	—	—	
2009	Pick Up The Pieces (The Very Best Of)	—	—	
2014	All The Pieces - The Complete Studio Recordings 1971–2003	—	—	
2019	Gold	99	—	
2020	Anthology	—	—	
2024	'50’ – A 50th Anniversary Celebration	—	—	
"—" denotes releases that did not chart or were not released in that territory.

=== Singles ===
Year	Title	Peak chart positions						Certifications	Album
Year	Title	UK	US	US R&B	US Dance	AUS	CAN	Certifications	Album
1973	"Put It Where You Want It"	—	—	—	—	—	—		Show Your Hand
1973	"Show Your Hand"	—	—	—	—	—	—		Show Your Hand
1973	"This World Has Music"	—	—	—	—	—	—		Show Your Hand
1974	"The Jugglers"	—	—	—	—	—	—		Show Your Hand
1974	"How Can You Go Home"	—	—	—	—	—	—		Put It Where You Want It (Note: This was the title for the 1975 re-issue of Show Your Hand. The track was originally a non-album single.)
1974	"You Got It"	—	—	—	—	—	—		AWB
1974	"Nothing You Can Do"	—	—	—	—	—	—		AWB
1974	"Pick Up the Pieces"	6	1	5	11	38	4	BPI: Silver; RIAA: Gold	AWB
1975	"Cut the Cake"	31	10	7	13	—	16		Cut the Cake
1975	"If I Ever Lose This Heaven"	—	39	25	—	—	—		Cut the Cake
1975	"School Boy Crush"	—	33	22	—	—	41		Cut the Cake
1976	"Cloudy"	—	—	55	—	—	—		Cut the Cake
1976	"Everybody's Darling"	—	—	—	—	—	—		Soul Searching
1976	"I'm the One"	—	—	—	—	—	—		Soul Searching
1976	"Queen of My Soul"	23	40	21	—	—	83		Soul Searching
1976	"A Love of Your Own"	—	—	35	—	—	—		Soul Searching
1977	"Goin' Home"	—	—	—	—	—	—		Soul Searching
1977	"Get It Up" (with Ben E. King)	—	—	21	—	—	—		Benny and Us (with Ben E. King)
1977	"A Star in the Ghetto" (with Ben E. King)	—	—	25	—	—	—		Benny and Us (with Ben E. King)
1977	"Fool for You Anyway" (with Ben E. King)	—	—	—	—	—	—		Benny and Us (with Ben E. King)
1977	"Imagine" (with Ben E. King)	—	—	—	—	—	—		Benny and Us (with Ben E. King)
1977	"Get It Up for Love" (with Ben E. King)	—	—	—	—	—	—		Benny and Us (with Ben E. King)
1978	"One Look Over My Shoulder (Is This Really Goodbye?)"	—	—	—	—	—	—		Warmer Communications
1978	"Your Love Is a Miracle"	—	—	33	—	—	—		Warmer Communications
1978	"Big City Lights"	—	—	—	—	—	—		Warmer Communications
1978	"Same Feeling, Different Song"	—	—	—	—	—	—		Warmer Communications
1978	"She's a Dream"	—	—	—	—	—	—		Warmer Communications
1979	"Walk On By"	46	92	32	—	—	—		Feel No Fret
1979	"When Will You Be Mine"	49	—	—	—	—	—		Feel No Fret
1979	"Atlantic Avenue"	—	—	—	—	—	—		Feel No Fret
1979	"Feel No Fret"	—	—	—	—	—	—		Feel No Fret
1980	"Let's Go Round Again"	12	53	40	24	—	—		Shine
1980	"For You, for Love"	46	—	60	—	—	—		Shine
1980	"Into the Night"	—	—	—	—	—	—		Shine
1982	"Easier Said Than Done"	—	—	—	—	—	—		Cupid's in Fashion
1982	"Cupid's in Fashion"	—	—	—	—	—	—		Cupid's in Fashion
1982	"You're My Number One"	—	—	—	—	—	—		Cupid's in Fashion
1982	"I Believe"	—	—	—	—	—	—		Cupid's in Fashion
1986	"Cut the Cake" (re-issue)	—	—	—	—	66	—		—N/a
1988	"The Spirit of Love" (featuring Chaka Khan and Ronnie Laws)	—	—	47	—	—	—		Aftershock
1989	"Sticky Situation"	—	—	—	—	—	—		Aftershock
1994	"Let's Go Round Again" (re-issue/remix)	56	—	—	—	—	—		—N/a
1996	"Every Beat of My Heart"	—	—	—	—	—	—		Soul Tattoo
1997	"Back to Basics"	—	—	—	—	—	—		Soul Tattoo
"—" denotes releases that did not chart or were not released in that territory.

=== Other contributions ===
- Wish You Were Here (1974) – Average White Horns on "Just a Chance" and "Should I Smoke" – arranged by Roger Ball
- Up (1976) – Morrissey–Mullen
- The Atlantic Family Live at Montreux (1977)
- The Cosmos Theme (1978) – written by Alan Gorrie and Steve Ferrone, and recorded by the band under the pseudonym "The Cosmic Highlanders"

== Bibliography ==
- The New Musical Express Book of Rock, 1975, Star Books, ISBN 0-352-30074-4
