= Forever More (band) =

- Photo of band taken from album liner notes

Background information
- Genres: Progressive rock

Forever More was a late 1960s and early 1970s progressive rock band. Forever More were signed to RCA New York and produced two LPs on that label. Both LPs were recorded at Olympic Studios in London, at the end of 1969/early 1970. Forever More's first LP, "Yours" was released in 1970. Forever More's second LP, "Words on Black Plastic" was not released until early 1971. Both albums were produced by Ray Singer and Simon Napier-Bell, who were known as Rocking Horse Productions. Vic Smith was the engineer on "Yours". They released 2 further albums "Glencoe" (1972) and "Spirit Of Glencoe" (1973). Glencoe disbanded in February 1974 and in March 1974 a third LP was made with a different line up and name as “Loving Awareness”

== Discography ==
Cover of the digitally remastered CD of both albums released in 2007

- Yours - Forever More (1970)
- Words on Black Plastic (1971)
- Forever More: Yours + Words On Black Plastic (2007)
