= Steve Ferrone =

English drummer (b. 1950)

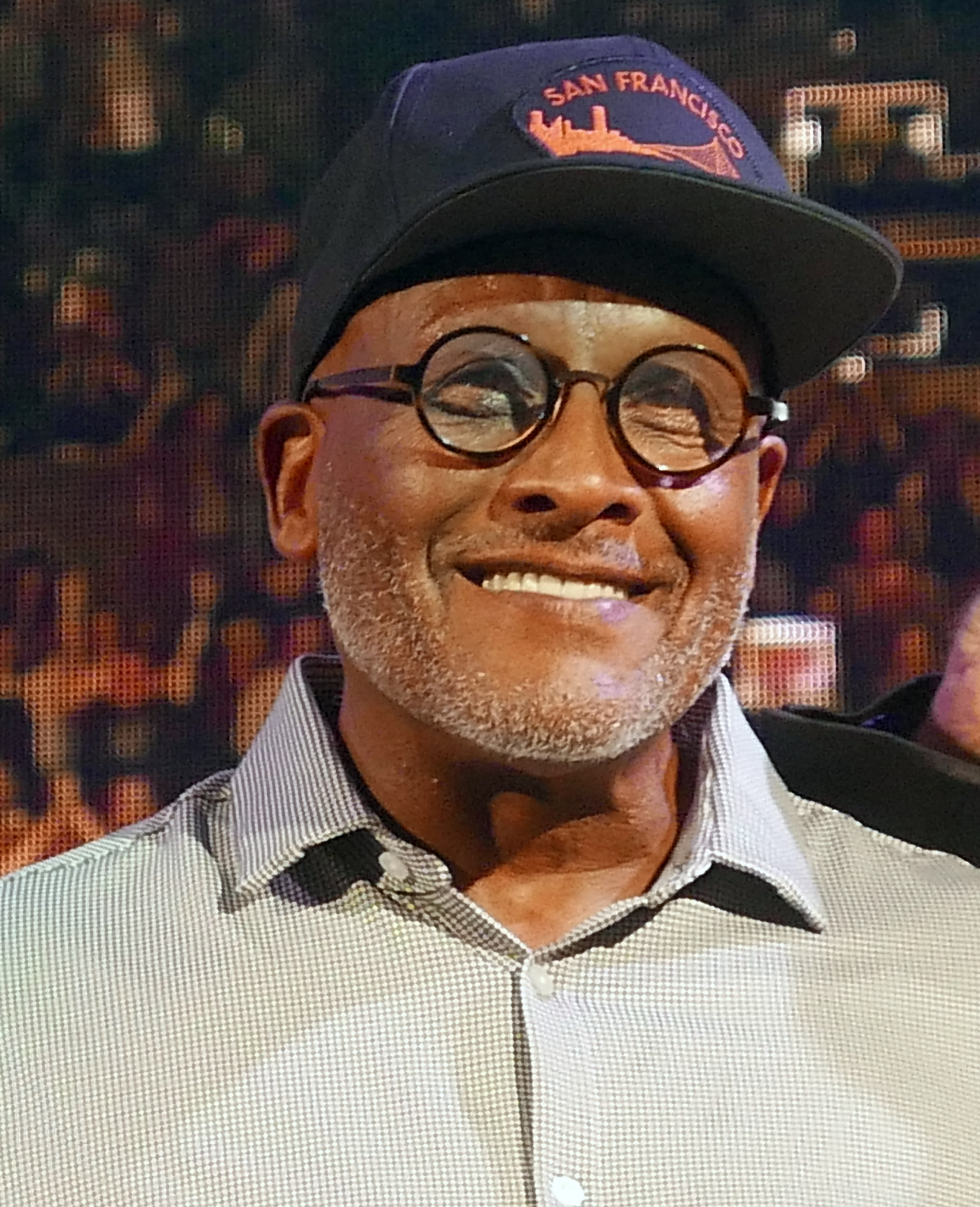
- Ferrone in 2017

Background information
- Born: Stephen Arthur Anthony Ferroni; 25 April 1950 (age 76); Brighton, Sussex, England
- Genres: Rock; funk; R&B; blues; pop
- Occupation: Musician
- Instrument: Drums
- Years active: 1968–present
- Formerly of: Average White Band; Tom Petty and the Heartbreakers
- Website: steveferrone.com

Stephen Arthur Anthony Ferrone (born Ferroni; 25 April 1950) is an English drummer. He was a member of the rock band Tom Petty and the Heartbreakers from 1994 to 2017, replacing original drummer Stan Lynch, and was part of the "classic lineup" of the Average White Band in the 1970s. Ferrone has recorded and performed with Michael Jackson, Eric Clapton, Roxy Music, Phil Collins, George Harrison, Duran Duran, Stevie Nicks, Laura Pausini, Christine McVie, Rick James, Slash, Chaka Khan, Bee Gees, Scritti Politti, Howard Jones, Aerosmith, Al Jarreau, Mick Jagger, Johnny Cash, Todd Rundgren and Pat Metheny. Ferrone also hosts The New Guy radio show on SiriusXM's Tom Petty Radio.

== Musical career ==
Ferrone played with the band Bloodstone, appearing on their 1975 album Riddle of the Sphinx. He then began playing with Brian Auger's band Oblivion Express, which had previously featured drummer Robbie McIntosh.

McIntosh later joined the Average White Band; however, just after releasing their first number-one album, he died of a heroin overdose. Ferrone was asked to join AWB in his place and stayed with them for the next eight years, recording and playing concert tours to support several hit albums, until AWB broke up in 1982.

Since appearing on Chaka Khan's 1978 debut album, Ferrone went on to play on most of her subsequent albums in the 80s, including "Naughty" with former AWB band member Hamish Stuart. In 1985, Ferrone joined the Saturday Night Live house band and was there for the 1985–86 season. He contributed as session drummer for Duran Duran on the Notorious, Big Thing, Duran Duran, and Thank You albums. He also toured with Duran Duran on the Strange Behaviour Tour in support of Notorious. He also toured and recorded with Eric Clapton from 1986 to 1992. During rehearsals in London for the George Harrison tour, he played drums for Duran Duran at Abbey Road Studios and recorded "Ordinary World". In 1991, Ferrone played drums on the George Harrison tour in Japan including three nights at the Tokyo Dome.

Ferrone met guitarist Mike Campbell of Tom Petty and the Heartbreakers when the two played a show with George Harrison as part of his Hari and the Hijack band at Royal Albert Hall. He became the band's full-time drummer after the departure of original drummer Stan Lynch in 1994. Ferrone's first album with the band was Tom Petty's second solo outing Wildflowers, released that same year. His first live performance as a member of the Heartbreakers was in Louisville, Kentucky on 28 February 1995.

In November 2002, Ferrone set up Drumroll Studios in Burbank, California with financial advisor Alan Arora and the technical expertise of producer John Jones, with whom he had worked since Duran Duran's "Ordinary World" in 1992. Later, they were joined by guitarist and producer Steve Postell. Together they recorded and produced albums and tracks for a variety of musical acts, as well as film and TV scores.

In 2010, Ferrone played on the eponymous first solo album by Slash, and joined the Italian band Pooh. He also worked on a collaborative project with composer and musician Eric Alexandrakis, guitarist and composer Warren Cuccurullo, and producer and songwriter Anthony J. Resta. Explaining the purpose of that project in a Modern Drummer news release, Alexandrakis said, "The four of us decided to create a scoring collective to pursue scoring projects in TV themes, film and advertising." In August 2018, he was announced as drummer for Dire Straits Legacy prior to their first US tour, consisting of 10 dates.

On 10 July 2019, Ferrone was inducted into the Brighton Music Walk of Fame in his hometown of Brighton, England. That same year, he recorded session drums for Stroke 9's studio album, Calafrio.

As of July 2024, Ferrone is on the road as the drummer for Mike Campbell's solo project, The Dirty Knobs.

== Personal life ==
Stephen Arthur Anthony Ferrone was born on 25 April 1950 in Brighton, Sussex to a Sierra Leonean father and English mother. Due to appearing Mediterranean at birth, a midwife suggested calling him Tony Ferroni, with his other middle name Arthur taken from his grandfather; after his skin darkened a few days later, his birth certificate was altered to change his surname from Ferroni to Ferrone. When he was 47, Ferrone sought out information regarding his biological father. Startled by the revelation from his mother that his father's surname was in fact Nicholson, Ferrone confided in Tom Petty who assured him that Steve Ferrone was a better name for a drummer than Steve Nicholson.

== Discography ==
- 1974: Live Oblivion Vol. 1 – Brian Auger's Oblivion Express
- 1974: Straight Ahead – Brian Auger's Oblivion Express
- 1974: Burglar – Freddie King
- 1975: Riddle of the Sphinx – Bloodstone
- 1975: Cut the Cake (album) – Average White Band (AWB)
- 1976: Soul Searching – AWB
- 1976: Larger Than Life – Freddie King
- 1976: Person To Person (live) – AWB
- 1976: Real Thing – Real Thing
- 1977: Benny & Us – AWB
- 1977: Burnin' At The Stake – Domenic Troiano Band
- 1977: Up – Morrissey–Mullen
- 1977: The Atlantic Family Live at Montreux
- 1978: Warmer Communications – AWB
- 1978: Chaka – Chaka Khan
- 1978: Roberta Flack – Roberta Flack
- 1979: Feel No Fret – AWB
- 1979: Castles in the Air – Felix Cavaliere
- 1979: Thighs and Whispers – Bette Midler
- 1980: Naughty – Chaka Khan
- 1980: Invisible Man's Band – Invisible Man's Band
- 1980: Shine – AWB
- 1980: Volume VIII – AWB
- 1981: What Cha' Gonna Do for Me – Chaka Khan
- 1981: Love All the Hurt Away – Aretha Franklin
- 1982: Cupid's in Fashion – AWB
- 1982: Changes – Keni Burke
- 1982: Jeffrey Osborne – Jeffrey Osborne
- 1982: Chaka Khan – Chaka Khan
- 1982: Instant Love – Cheryl Lynn
- 1983: Hearts and Bones – Paul Simon
- 1983: Stay With Me Tonight – Jeffrey Osborne
- 1983: In Your Eyes – George Benson
- 1983: Robbery – Teena Marie
- 1983: Emergency – Melissa Manchester
- 1984: I Feel For You – Chaka Khan
- 1984: Don't Stop – Jeffrey Osborne
- 1984: Christine McVie – Christine McVie
- 1985: Glow – Rick James
- 1985: Cupid & Psyche 85 – Scritti Politti ("Wood Beez (Pray Like Aretha Franklin)", "Don't Work That Hard" and "Absolute")
- 1985: She's the Boss – Mick Jagger
- 1985: Gettin' Away with Murder – Patti Austin
- 1985: 20/20 – George Benson
- 1985: Take No Prisoners – Peabo Bryson
- 1985: Say You Love Me – Jennifer Holliday
- 1986: Souliloquy – Dick Morrissey
- 1986: Destiny – Chaka Khan
- 1986: Notorious – Duran Duran
- 1986: L Is for Lover − Al Jarreau
- 1986: One to One – Howard Jones
- 1986: Good to Go Lover – Gwen Guthrie
- 1986: Back in the High Life – Steve Winwood ("Freedom Overspill")
- 1986: Enough Is Enough – Billy Squier
- 1986: Three Hearts in the Happy Ending Machine – Daryl Hall
- 1987: Red Hot Rhythm & Blues – Diana Ross
- 1987: Two Stories – The Williams Brothers
- 1987: Humansystem – TM Network
- 1988: Big Thing – Duran Duran
- 1988: Oasis – Roberta Flack
- 1988: Positive – Peabo Bryson
- 1988: The Corporate World – Gail Ann Dorsey
- 1988: C.K. – Chaka Khan
- 1988: More Than Friends – Jonathan Butler
- 1989: A Night to Remember – Cyndi Lauper
- 1989: When All the Pieces Fit – Peter Frampton
- 1989: One – Bee Gees
- 1989: Cosmic Thing – B52's
- 1989: Journeyman – Eric Clapton
- 1989: City Streets – Carole King
- 1990: I'm Your Baby Tonight – Whitney Houston
- 1990: Making Every Moment Count – Peter Allen
- 1990: Composition – Anita Baker
- 1990: Oltre – Claudio Baglioni
- 1991: 24 Nights – Eric Clapton
- 1991: Inside Out – Clive Griffin
- 1991: Love Life – Akiko Yano
- 1992: Unplugged – Eric Clapton
- 1992: Road to Freedom – Grayson Hugh
- 1992: Live in Japan – George Harrison with Eric Clapton and Band
- 1992: The Right Time – Etta James
- 1992: The Woman I Am – Chaka Khan
- 1992: Secret Story – Pat Metheny
- 1993: Spin 1ne 2wo – Spin 1ne 2wo
- 1993: The Wedding Album – Duran Duran
- 1993: The Sun Don't Lie – Marcus Miller
- 1993: Tutte Storie – Eros Ramazzotti
- 1993: Head to Head – Jonathan Butler
- 1993: Soul on Board – Curt Smith
- 1993: Taxi – Bryan Ferry
- 1993: Love Remembers – George Benson
- 1993: Independence – Lulu
- 1993: Clive Griffin – Clive Griffin
- 1994: Wildflowers – Tom Petty
- 1994: Letters Never Sent – Carly Simon
- 1994: Hold On – Alan Frew
- 1994: Mamouna – Bryan Ferry
- 1994: Rhythm of Love – Anita Baker
- 1994: That Secret Place – Patti Austin
- 1995: Playback – Tom Petty and the Heartbreakers
- 1995: Shadow Man – Sasha Gracanin featuring Mick Taylor
- 1995: New Beginning – Tracy Chapman
- 1995: HIStory: Past, Present and Future, Book I – Michael Jackson
- 1995: Thank You – Duran Duran
- 1996: Las Cosas Que Vives – Laura Pausini
- 1996: Unchained – Johnny Cash
- 1996: I'm Doing Fine – Dan Hill
- 1996: Sutras – Donovan
- 1996: Songs and Music from She's the One – Tom Petty and the Heartbreakers
- 1996: Falling into You – Céline Dion
- 1998: One Moment in Time – John Jones
- 1998: Another World – Brian May
- 1999: Echo – Tom Petty and the Heartbreakers
- 1999: Breakdown – Melissa Etheridge
- 1999: Timbre – Sophie B. Hawkins
- 2001: Trouble in Shangri-La – Stevie Nicks
- 2002: The Last DJ – Tom Petty and the Heartbreakers
- 2002: Twisted Angel – LeAnn Rimes
- 2002: Escapology – Robbie Williams
- 2003: It Up: Steve Ferrone and Friends Live at La Ve Lee
- 2003: Dragonfly – Ziggy Marley
- 2004: Live at Shibuya Public Hall – Tokyo, Japan 1983 — George Duke Band
- 2004: Freak Out – Chris Catena
- 2004: In The Meantime – Christine McVie
- 2004: My Everything – Anita Baker
- 2004: Peace... Back by Popular Demand – Keb' Mo'
- 2004: Come As You Are — Mindi Abair
- 2004: Keep It Simple — Keb' Mo'
- 2006: More Head – Steve Ferrone's Farm Fur
- 2006: Fast Man Raider Man – Frank Black
- 2006: Suitcase — Keb' Mo'
- 2007: "Zen Blues Quartet" – with Tim Scott, Jeff Young and John March
- 2008: The Black and White Years – The Black and White Years
- 2009: black n white album – John Jones
- 2009: The Live Anthology – Tom Petty and the Heartbreakers
- 2009 "Zen Blues Quartet, Again and Yet again" with Mike Finnigan, Tim Scott and John March
- 2010: Slash – Slash
- 2010: Mojo – Tom Petty and the Heartbreakers
- 2010: Dove Comincia il Sole – Pooh
- 2010: I Feel Like Playing – Ronnie Wood
- 2011: In Your Dreams – Stevie Nicks
- 2011: Dedicated – A Salute to the 5 Royales – Steve Cropper
- 2014: Live – Steve Ferrone & Friends
- 2014: Hypnotic Eye – Tom Petty and the Heartbreakers
- 2014: Fly Rasta – Ziggy Marley
- 2015: Today Is Christmas – LeAnn Rimes
- 2015: Postcards In Real Time – Unquiet Nights
- 2016: Ziggy Marley – Ziggy Marley
- 2017: Three Sixty – The 360 Band
- 2017: Bidin' My Time – Chris Hillman
- 2018: Traces – Steve Perry
- 2021: Mo'Live – Steve Ferrone & Friends II
- 2024: Vagabonds, Virgins & Misfits - Mike Campbell & The Dirty Knobs
