= Molly Duncan =

Scottish saxophonist (1945–2019)

- Born: Malcolm Duncan; 24 August 1945; Montrose, Angus, Scotland
- Died: 8 October 2019 (aged 74) Bocholt, North Rhine-Westphalia, Germany
- Formerly of: Average White Band, Ray Charles, Tom Petty, Buddy Guy, Ben E. King, Dire Straits, Bryan Ferry

Malcolm "Molly" Duncan (24 August 1945 – 8 October 2019) was a Scottish tenor saxophonist, and founding member of Average White Band.

== Early life ==
Duncan was born in Montrose, the second of four children. His father was an architect.

Duncan attended Duncan of Jordanstone College of Art in Dundee, where he met Roger Ball and Alan Gorrie; Duncan and Ball, both of whom played saxophone, were known as the Dundee Horns.

== Career ==
In 1971, Duncan, Ball, Gorrie, Hamish Stuart, Onnie McIntyre, and Robbie McIntosh formed Average White Band. The band are perhaps best known for their 1974 US number one "Pick Up the Pieces", on which Duncan played the saxophone solo. The band disbanded in 1982.

After the Average White Band ended, Duncan became a session saxophonist. He recorded with artists including Johnny Hates Jazz, Curiosity Killed the Cat, Tom Petty, Eurythmics, Buddy Guy and Feargal Sharkey. He also played horns on Dire Straits' Brothers in Arms album in 1985.

He collaborated with other studio musicians to form Knee Deep, a funk and fusion group; and Cold Sweat and the Horny Horns. In the 1990s, he worked with club music band Intense, which featured his son Dan. In July 2015, Duncan, along, with Steve Ferrone and Hamish Stuart reunited to form The 360 Band. This was in essence one half of the original Average White Band. They released an album titled Three Sixty in 2017 and performed live together along with supporting musicians.

== Death ==
Duncan died at his home in Bocholt, Germany on 7 October 2019, at age 74, shortly after it had been announced that he had been diagnosed with terminal lung cancer. He was survived by his son Dan and his partner Christine.
