= Onnie McIntyre =

Scottish musician (born 1945)

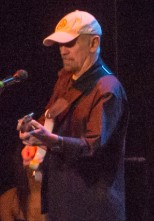
- McIntyre in 2013

Background information
- Also known as: Onnie Mair
- Born: 25 September 1945 (age 80); Lennoxtown, Scotland
- Genres: Funk, R&B, rock
- Instruments: Guitar, bass, vocals
- Years active: 1964–present
- Formerly of: Forever More, Average White Band

Owen "Onnie" McIntyre (born 25 September 1945), known earlier in his career as Onnie Mair, is a Scottish musician, best known for being a member of Average White Band. Along with bassist Alan Gorrie he was a constant member of the band from 1972 until the band's retirement in 2024.

== Early life ==
McIntyre was born in Lennoxtown. His family moved to Auchinairn, where he attended Auchinairn Primary school.

== Career ==
In 1964, McIntyre was a member of the band the In Crowd as lead guitarist. McIntyre left the band in 1966 and was replaced by Hugh Nicholson. In 1967, McIntyre joined The Scots of St. James, who in 1968 changed their name to Hopscotch. By 1969, McIntyre was in the progressive rock band Forever More, under the name Onnie Mair, with guitarist Mick Strode, drummer Stuart Francis, and bassist Alan Gorrie, the latter of whom he later formed Average White Band with.

McIntyre formed Average White Band in late 1971. The band are best known for their 1974 instrumental "Pick Up the Pieces", which the entire band was credited as songwriters to. In 1972, McIntyre played guitar on Chuck Berry's "My Ding-a-Ling" along with Average White Band drummer Robbie McIntosh.

The original Average White Band split up in 1982, and McIntyre worked from home to help with wife and young son, writing jingles for adverts and work as a session musician, as well as working in a fine arts company in New York. In 1989, McIntyre, bassist Alan Gorrie, and saxophonist Roger Ball reformed the band.

McIntyre has been a session guitarist/composer for albums released by Paul Korda, Roy Young, Dick Morrissey, Ben E. King, Kate Taylor, Chaka Khan, Carly Simon, Passport, Jesse Rae, The Phil Collins Big Band, Tommi Mischell, Tony Monaco, Charles Earland, Jeff Golub, Freddy V., and Arif Mardin.

McIntyre and Gorrie owned the "Average White Band", and continued to be in the group until 2024, when the band retired following a farewell tour.
