= Alan Gorrie =

Scottish musician

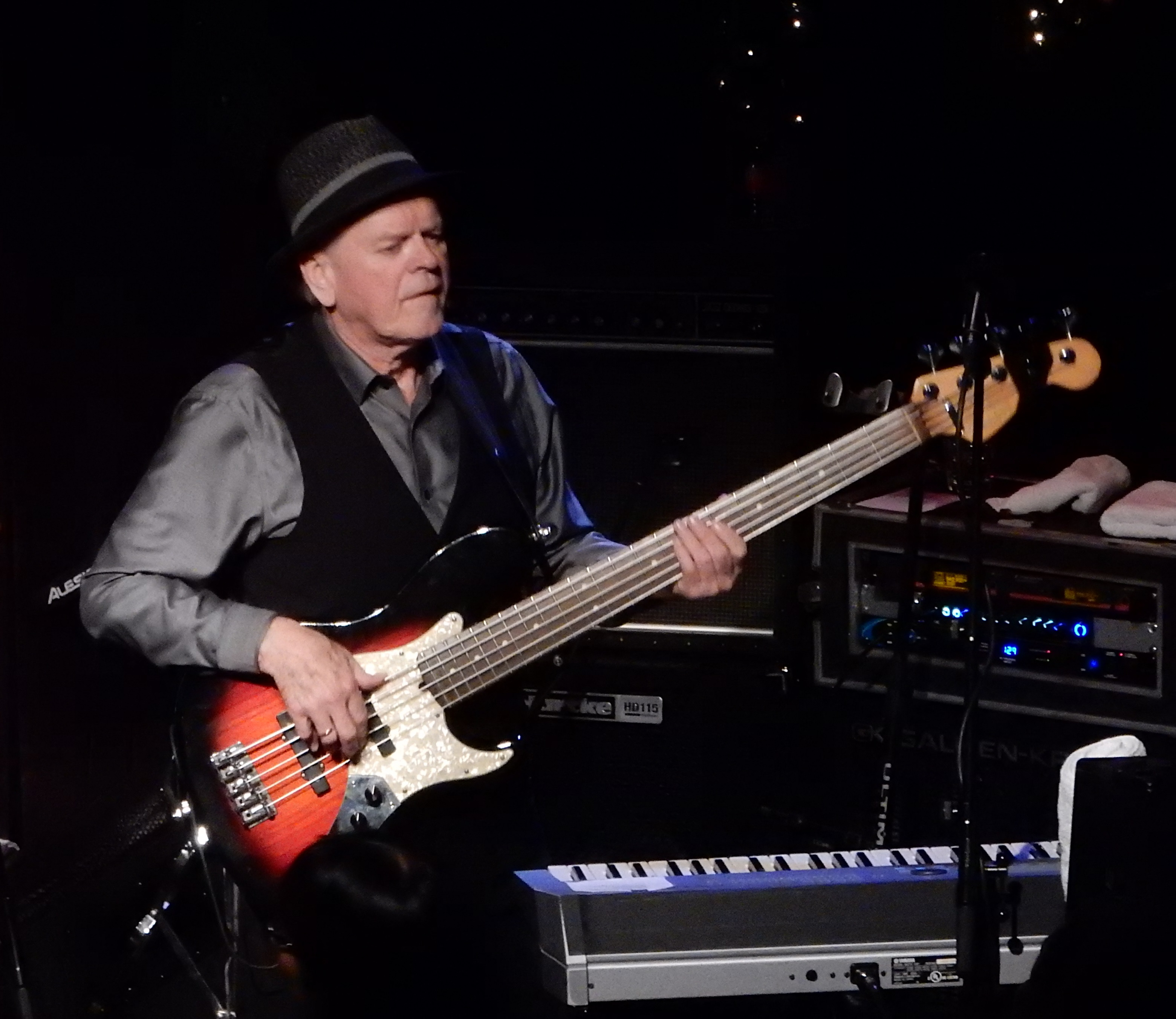
- Gorrie performing with Average White Band in Seattle, 2019

Background information
- Born: 19 July 1946 (age 80); Perth, Scotland
- Genres: Funk, rhythm and blues
- Instruments: Bass guitar, guitar, keyboard
- Years active: 1965–present
- Formerly of: Forever More, Average White Band

Alan Edward Gorrie (born 19 July 1946) is a Scottish bassist, guitarist, keyboardist and singer. He was a founding member of the Average White Band and was one of two original members in the group's final line-up alongside Onnie McIntyre.

== Early life ==
Gorrie was born and raised in Perth. His father was a jazz pianist.

Gorrie started playing bass at the age of ten, after his father introduced him to the music of jazz upright bassist Ray Brown. His other bass influences include James Jamerson and Donald "Duck" Dunn. Gorrie's vocal influences include Marvin Gaye, Wilson Pickett, Otis Redding, Al Green, and Steve Winwood, as well as Doug Martin, a local club singer; one of his inspirations for playing the guitar is Bobby Womack.

Gorrie attended Duncan of Jordonstone College of Art, but dropped out.

== Career ==
Gorrie's first professional came when he was a teenager, when he formed The Vikings. The band became the resident band at the La Bamba club in Falkirk.

Gorrie moved to London in late 1966 with Robbie McIntosh and Molly Duncan. In the late 1960s, he played in Forever More, a progressive rock band. Gorrie appeared in Lindsay Shonteff's 1970 exploitation film Permissive, and also composed the scores for Shonteff's films The Yes Girls (1971) and The Fast Kill (1972).

Gorrie and another Forever More bandmember, Owen "Onnie" McIntyre, formed the Average White Band in London in 1972. They became a successful funk/R&B group, topping record charts internationally with the AWB album and "Pick Up the Pieces" single. Average White Band disbanded in 1982, and Gorrie worked with Daryl Hall, and also worked as a songwriter, writing for artists including Smokey Robinson, Ronnie Milsap and Jaki Graham. In 1985, he released his first solo album, Sleepless Nights.

In 1989, Gorrie reformed AWB with McIntyre and saxophonist Roger Ball. Gorrie and McIntyre continued to tour until 2024, when the band retired following a farewell tour. Although the band has retired, Gorrie mentioned using the free time working on writing new material.

== Personal life ==
Gorrie lives in Connecticut. In 2006, Gorrie got back into painting again after joining an art institute.

== Solo discography ==
- Sleepless Nights (1985)
- The Fast Kill (1972) at IMDb
