= Hamish Stuart =

Scottish musician (born 1949)

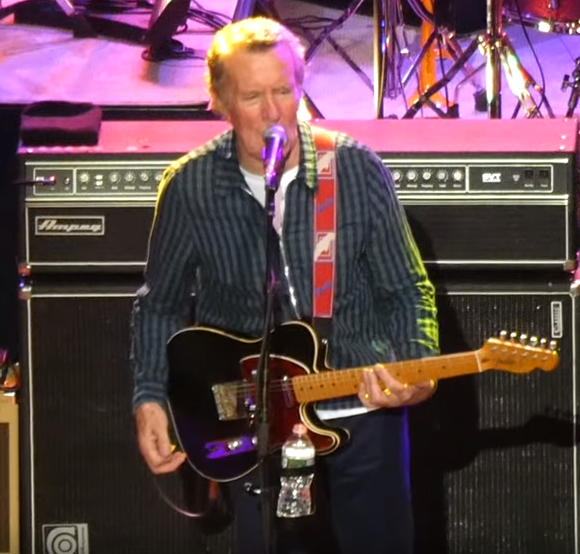
- Stuart performing in 2019

Background information
- Born: James Hamish Stuart; 8 October 1949 (age 76); Glasgow, Scotland
- Origin: London, England
- Genres: Jazz; R&B; funk; rock; pop; soul
- Occupations: Musician; composer; record producer
- Instruments: Guitar; bass; vocals
- Years active: 1964–present
- Member of: Ringo Starr & His All-Starr Band
- Formerly of: Average White Band; Paul McCartney Band; The 360 Band

James Hamish Stuart (born 8 October 1949) is a Scottish guitarist, bassist, singer, composer and record producer. He was an original member of the Average White Band.

== Biography ==
Born in 8 October 1949 in Glasgow, Scotland, Stuart was raised in the Muirend section. He attended Queens Park School before leaving to form his first professional band, the Dream Police, in 1964, featuring himself on lead guitar.

The band recorded three singles on Decca Records before Stuart was invited to join the recently formed Average White Band (AWB) in the summer of 1972, replacing guitarist Michael Rosen.

Remaining with the band until its 1982 breakup, Stuart went on to work with Chaka Khan, George Benson, David Sanborn, and Aretha Franklin.

Stuart also wrote or co-wrote vehicles for other artists, such as Atlantic Starr's 1986 hit "If Your Heart Isn't in It", as well as songs for Jeffrey Osborne, George Benson, Smokey Robinson, and Diana Ross.

Stuart joined Paul McCartney’s band (where he switched between guitar and bass as necessary with McCartney) for McCartney's 1989 comeback album Flowers in the Dirt and went on to appear on several other albums and McCartney's world tours of 1989 and 1993.

After collaborating on numerous albums for other artists, he recorded his first solo album, Sooner or Later, in 1999, 17 years after leaving the Average White Band, which he released on his own record label, Sulphuric Records.

Apart from playing with his own group, the Hamish Stuart Band, and with his fellow Glaswegian guitarist and friend Jim Mullen, Stuart has also produced Gordon Haskell and the Swedish singer-songwriter Meja.

In 2006, Stuart toured as the bass player with Ringo Starr & His All-Starr Band. He joined Starr again for a 2008 tour, where he performed "Pick Up The Pieces" and "Work to Do". He once again toured with Ringo in 2019 playing "Pick Up the Pieces", "Work to Do", and "Cut the Cake". Although the tour paused because of COVID-19 precautions, it resumed in 2022, completing tour dates initially planned for 2020.

In 2007, he produced and appeared as a guest vocalist on the album All About the Music, by The AllStars collective.

In July 2015, Stuart reunited with his AWB bandmates Malcolm "Molly" Duncan and Steve Ferrone to form The 360 Band. This is in essence one third of the original Average White Band. They released an album titled Three Sixty in 2017 and have been performing live together along with supporting musicians.

Since 2019, he has toured as a featured member of Ringo Starr & His All-Starr Band.

He is the curator, along with partner Claire Houlihan and friend Tom Sutton-Roberts, of the annual mOare Music festival, held in the village of Oare, Faversham, Kent.

In recognition of his unique contribution to music, Stuart was awarded with a BASCA Gold Badge award in 2016.

== Personal life ==
Since approximately 1996, Stuart has lived with his partner, New Zealand-born restaurateur Claire Houlihan.

== Discography ==
=== Albums ===
List of albums, with selected details
| Title | Details |
|---|---|
| Sooner or Later | Released: 1999; Format: CD; Label: Sulphuric Records (SUCCD001) |
| Let It Snow | Released: 2003; Format: CD; Label: Sulphuric Records (SUCCD005) |

== See also ==
- Average White Band
