= I Remember Clifford (song) =

Jazz composition by Benny Golson

Composition by Benny Golson

from the album Jazz Lab
- Written: 1956
- Genre: Jazz
- Composer: Benny Golson

"I Remember Clifford" is an instrumental jazz threnody written by jazz tenor saxophonist Benny Golson in memory of Clifford Brown, the influential and highly regarded jazz trumpeter who died in an auto accident at the age of 25. Brown and Golson had previously worked together in Lionel Hampton's 1953 band.

The song was first recorded by Donald Byrd and Gigi Gryce on the album Jazz Lab in February 1957.

== Notable recordings ==
- Bob Acri, Bob Acri (Blujazz, 2004)
- Art Blakey and the Jazz Messengers, 1958 – Paris Olympia (Fontana, 1958)
- Donald Byrd and Gigi Gryce, Jazz Lab (Columbia, 1957)
- George Cables, Circle (Contemporary, 1979)
- Ray Charles, My Kind of Jazz (Tangerine, 1970)
- Peter Delano, Peter Delano (Verve, 1993)
- Kenny Dorham, This Is the Moment! (Riverside, 1958)
- Don Ellis, Shock Treatment (Columbia, 1968)
- Art Farmer, Benny Golson, in the Jazztet, Meet the Jazztet (Argo, 1960)
- Stan Getz and Kenny Barron, People Time: The Complete Recordings (Universal/Sunnyside, 1991)
- Dizzy Gillespie, Dizzy Gillespie at Newport (Verve, 1957)
- Benny Golson, Stockholm Sojourn (Prestige, 1964)
- Roy Hargrove and the Jazz Networks, The Tokyo Sessions (Novus/RCA, 1991)
- Woody Herman, Woody Live East and West (CBS, 1967)
- Milt Jackson, Bags' Opus (United Artists, 1958)
- Quincy Jones, The Birth of a Band! (Mercury, 1959)
- John Lewis, The Wonderful World of Jazz (Atlantic, 1961)
- The Manhattan Transfer, Vocalese (Atlantic, 1985)
- Hugh Masekela, Almost Like Being in Jazz (Chisa, 2005)
- Carmen McRae, Carmen for Cool Ones (Decca, 1958)
- Helen Merrill, Brownie: Homage to Clifford Brown (Verve, 1995)
- Modern Jazz Quartet, European Concert (Atlantic, 1960)
- Modern Jazz Quartet, Dedicated to Connie (Atlantic, recorded May 1960, released 1995)
- J.R. Monterose, J.R. Monterose is Alive in Amsterdam Paradiso (Heavy Soul, 1969)
- James Moody, Moody with Strings (Argo, 1960)
- Lee Morgan, Lee Morgan, Vol. 3 (Blue Note, 1957)
- Oscar Peterson, Something Warm (Verve, 1962)
- Bud Powell with Don Byas, A Tribute to Cannonball (Columbia, 1961): released in 1979
- Buddy Rich, Blues Caravan (Verve, 1961)
- Sonny Rollins with Thad Jones, Now's the Time (RCA Victor, 1964)
- Masayoshi Takanaka, Brasilian Skies (Kitty, 1978)
- Arturo Sandoval, I Remember Clifford (GRP, 1992)
- Dinah Washington, The Queen (Mercury, 1959)
- Bill Wurtz, Jazz Green Giant (2014)
