= The Sheriff (album) =

Studio album by Modern Jazz Quartet
- Released: 1964
- Recorded: May 16–17 and December 20, 1963; New York City
- Genre: Jazz
- Length: 30:21
- Label: Atlantic 1414
- Producer: Nesuhi Ertegun

Modern Jazz Quartet chronology
Lonely Woman (1962)	The Sheriff (1964)	Collaboration (1964)

Milt Jackson chronology
Vibrations (1964)	The Sheriff (1964)	Much in Common (1964)

Professional ratings
Review scores
Source	Rating
Allmusic	3/5 stars
The Penguin Guide to Jazz Recordings	3/4 stars
Record Mirror	3/5 stars

The Sheriff is an album by American jazz group the Modern Jazz Quartet featuring performances recorded in 1963 and released on the Atlantic label.

== Reception ==
The AllMusic review stated: "The Sheriff features the Modern Jazz Quartet in fine swinging form. The program is not as sharply focused as on some of the earlier Atlantic releases, but it is compelling nonetheless".

== Track listing ==
All compositions by John Lewis, except as indicated

1. "The Sheriff" - 2:41
2. "In a Crowd" - 3:05
3. "Bachianas Brasileiras" (Heitor Villa-Lobos) - 5:44
4. "Mean to Me" (Fred E. Ahlert, Roy Turk) - 4:24
5. "Natural Affection" - 4:08
6. "Donnie's Theme" - 4:13
7. "Carnival" (Luiz Bonfá) - 6:06

== Personnel ==
MJQ

- Milt Jackson - vibraphone
- John Lewis - piano
- Percy Heath - bass
- Connie Kay - drums

Production

- Nesuhi Ertegun - producer
- Tom Dowd - recording engineer
- Stanislaw Zagórski - cover art
