= 1953: An Exceptional Encounter =

Live album by Ben Webster and Modern Jazz Quartet
- Released: February 13, 2001
- Recorded: February 21 & 28, 1953
- Venue: Birdland, New York City
- Genre: Jazz
- Length: 40:01
- Label: The Jazz Factory

Ben Webster chronology
The Jeep Is Jumping (1990)	1953: An Exceptional Encounter (2001)

Modern Jazz Quartet chronology
In A Crowd (1997)	1953: An Exceptional Encounter (2001)

1953: An Exceptional Encounter is a live album by Ben Webster and the Modern Jazz Quartet that was recorded for a radio broadcast in 1953 and released in 2001.

== Track listing ==
No.	Title	Length
1.	"Confirmation" (Charlie Parker)	5:27
2.	"You Are Too Beautiful" (Rodgers and Hart)	3:51
3.	"Oh, Lady Be Good!" (George Gershwin/Ira Gershwin)	5:25
4.	"The Nearness of You" (Hoagy Carmichael/Ned Washington)	5:38
5.	"Poutin'" (Ben Webster)	4:57
6.	"Danny Boy" (Frederic Weatherly)	4:37
7.	"Billie's Bounce" (Charlie Parker)	4:27
8.	"Cotton Tail" (Duke Ellington)	5:39

== Personnel ==
- Ben Webster – tenor sax
- John Lewis – piano
- Milt Jackson – vibes
- Percy Heath – double bass
- Kenny Clarke – drums
