= In Memoriam (Modern Jazz Quartet album) =

Studio album by Modern Jazz Quartet
- Released: 1974
- Recorded: November 5–6, 1973
- Studio: CBS Studios, New York City
- Genre: Jazz
- Length: 33:51
- Label: Little David LD 3001
- Producer: John Lewis and Teo Macero

Modern Jazz Quartet chronology
The Legendary Profile (1972)	In Memoriam (1974)	Blues on Bach (1974)

Milt Jackson chronology
Sunflower (1974)	In Memoriam (1974)	Blues on Bach (1974)

Professional ratings
Review scores
Source	Rating
Allmusic	2/5 stars
The Rolling Stone Jazz Record Guide	3/5 stars

In Memoriam is an album by American jazz group the Modern Jazz Quartet recorded in 1973 and released on the Little David label.

== Background ==
On the Album In Memoriam, recorded a year before the start of their hiatus, the Modern Jazz Quartet was accompanied by an orchestra conducted by Maurice Peress. Pianist John Lewis wrote the title composition in tribute to Walter Keller, his piano teacher at the University of New Mexico. He composed "Jazz Ostinato" around 1960 during the third stream era; it is based on three ostinato figures, the third of which he said was originally conceived as backing "for an Ornette Coleman – Eric Dolphy approach". Furthermore, the piece contains homages to Arnold Schoenberg and Igor Stravinsky, prompting Lewis to comment that it "also plays a part in the memorium". The group had previously recorded the adagio from "Concierto de Aranjuez" with the guitarist Laurindo Almeida on their 1964 album Collaboration.

== Reception ==
The Allmusic review stated "despite some stimulating moments, the music is often quite dry. It's one of the classic group's lesser releases".

== Track listing ==
All compositions by John Lewis except as indicated

1. "In Memoriam – First Movement" – 8:40
2. "In Memoriam – Second Movement" 9:03
3. "Jazz Ostinato" – 6:19
4. "Adagio from the Guitar Concerto: Concerto de Aranjuez" (Joaquín Rodrigo) – 9:49

== Personnel ==
Musicians

- Milt Jackson – vibraphone
- John Lewis – piano
- Percy Heath – bass
- Connie Kay – drums
- Unnamed symphony orchestra conducted by Maurice Peress

Production

- John Lewis – producer
- Teo Macero – producer
- Stanley Tonkel – recording engineer
- Gene Paul – re-mix engineer
- John Lewis – re-mix engineer
- Edd Kolakowski – Steinway piano technician
