= Three Windows =

Studio album by Modern Jazz Quartet
- Released: 1987
- Recorded: March 16–20, 1987; New York City
- Genre: Jazz
- Length: 51:38
- Label: Atlantic 81761-1
- Producer: Nesuhi Ertegun

Modern Jazz Quartet chronology
Topsy: This One's for Basie (1985)	Three Windows (1987)	The Complete Last Concert (1988)

Professional ratings
Review scores
Source	Rating
Allmusic	3/5 stars
The Penguin Guide to Jazz Recordings	3/4 stars

Three Windows is an album by American jazz group the Modern Jazz Quartet featuring performances recorded with the New York Chamber Symphony in 1987 and released on the Atlantic label.

== Reception ==
The Allmusic review stated "Nice music overall although this is not one of the most essential MJQ releases".

== Track listing ==
All compositions by John Lewis

1. "Three Windows" - 8:13
2. "Kansas City Breaks" - 6:29
3. "Encounter in Cagnes" - 12:28
4. "Django" - 7:54
5. "A Day in Dubrovnik" - 16:34

== Personnel ==
- Milt Jackson - vibraphone
- John Lewis - piano
- Percy Heath - bass
- Connie Kay - drums, percussion
- New York Chamber Symphony conducted by John Lewis
