= MJQ & Friends: A 40th Anniversary Celebration =

Studio album with 1 live recording by Modern Jazz Quartet
- Released: February 1994
- Recorded: June 1992 (Power Station, New York City), April 1993 (Skyline Studios, New York City and Conway Studios, Los Angeles), July 1993 (the Montreux Jazz Festival, Montreux)
- Genre: Jazz
- Length: 71:23
- Label: Atlantic 82538-2
- Producer: Ahmet Ertegun and Arif Mardin

Modern Jazz Quartet chronology
For Ellington (1988)	MJQ & Friends: A 40th Anniversary Celebration (1994)	Dedicated to Connie (1995)

Professional ratings
Review scores
Source	Rating
Allmusic	4.5/5 stars
The Penguin Guide to Jazz Recordings	3/4 stars

MJQ & Friends: A 40th Anniversary Celebration is an album by American jazz group the Modern Jazz Quartet featuring performances recorded in New York City, Los Angeles and at the Montreux Jazz Festival with guest artists including Bobby McFerrin, Take 6, Phil Woods, Wynton Marsalis, Illinois Jacquet, Harry "Sweets" Edison, Branford Marsalis, Jimmy Heath, Freddie Hubbard and Nino Tempo and released on the Atlantic label.

== Reception ==
The Allmusic review stated "It's an enjoyable and varied set".

== Track listing ==
1. "Bags' Groove" (Milt Jackson) – 5:01
2. "All the Things You Are" (Oscar Hammerstein II, Jerome Kern) – 5:57
3. "Cherokee" (Ray Noble) – 6:08
4. "(Back Home Again in) Indiana" (James F. Hanley< Ballard MacDonald) – 7:44
5. "Come Rain or Come Shine" (Harold Arlen, Johnny Mercer) – 5:28
6. "Willow Weep for Me" (Ann Ronell) – 6:14
7. "Memories of You" (Eubie Blake, Andy Razaf) – 4:16
8. "Blues for Juanita" (Jackson) – 3:55
9. "There Will Never Be Another You" (Mack Gordon, Harry Warren) – 4:40
10. "Easy Living" (Ralph Rainger, Leo Robin) – 4:10
11. "Django" (John Lewis) – 7:43
12. "Darn That Dream" (Eddie DeLange, Jimmy Van Heusen)(Live) – 5:16
13. "Billie's Bounce" (Charlie Parker) – 4:45

== Personnel ==
- Milt Jackson – vibraphone
- John Lewis – piano
- Percy Heath – bass
- Connie Kay, Mickey Roker – drums, percussion
- Bobby McFerrin (tracks 1 & 13), Take 6 (track 1) – vocals
- Wynton Marsalis (tracks 3 & 6), Harry "Sweets" Edison (tracks 4 & 7) – trumpet
- Freddie Hubbard – flugelhorn (track 9)
- Phil Woods – alto saxophone (tracks 2 & 11)
- Jimmy Heath (track 8), Illinois Jacquet (track 4 & 7), Branford Marsalis (tracks 5 & 10), Nino Tempo (track 12) – tenor saxophone
