= Django (composition) =

Jazz song by John Lewis

Instrumental by the Modern Jazz Quartet

from the album: Modern Jazz Quartet, Vol. 2; Django
- Released: 1955; 1956
- Recorded: December 23, 1954
- Genre: Jazz
- Length: 7:03
- Composer: John Lewis
- Producer: Bob Weinstock

"Django" is a 1954 jazz standard written by John Lewis as a tribute to the Belgian-born jazz guitarist Django Reinhardt. It was a signature composition of the Modern Jazz Quartet, of which Lewis was the pianist and musical director.

== Background and structure ==
I was tremendously impressed. Then I heard some record he made with members of the Teddy Hill band, Including a duet with Bill Coleman that was unbelievable. I definitely got to know his music when he came to this country in 1947 to play with Duke Ellington. He came down to a club where we were working on Fifty-second Street, and we played overtime to make a good impression. It was wonderful to watch the change that took place in his playing, from things that were made in 1937 to things he was doing at the time he died. He kept changing. And I was so sorry when he died. I would have liked to spend more time with him.

— John Lewis on Django Reinhardt

Lewis wrote "Django" in 1954 as a tribute to his friend, the Belgian-born jazz guitarist Django Reinhardt, who died the previous year. It begins with a 20-bar theme that was described by Ted Gioia in his book The Jazz Standards as dirge-like and mournful. The entry for "django" in the original edition of the Real Book only contained the chord changes for this theme. It is followed by solo sections in modified Thirty-two-bar AABA form, where the first two A sections contain six bars instead of eight, the eight-bar B section contains a pedal point on the tonic, and the final twelve-bar A section contains a boogie bass motif. The solo sections are separated by interludes in double-time derived from the introductory theme. The composition ends with a full repeat of the introductory section.

First recorded on December 23, 1954 by the Modern Jazz Quartet, it appeared on the group's 1955 10-inch album The Modern Jazz Quartet, Vol. 2 (PRLP 170) and their 1956 12-inch LP Django (PRLP 7057), as well as being released as a 45 RPM single with part 1 on side A and part 2 on side B. It was one of the Modern Jazz Quartet's signature compositions, with the group's bassist Percy Heath recalling that "If we didn't play 'Django' in a concert, we risked getting stoned. I mean in the thrown-at sense." Miles Davis described "Django" as one of the best compositions ever, and in their book Clawing at the Limits of Cool, Salim Washington and Farah Griffin said, "It is almost like a poem in its economy and poignancy. With remarkable restraint and almost no concessions to the extroverted tendencies of jazz, the slow and dirgelike 'Django' sustains an intensity and pathos made all the more beautiful through restraint." It was listed on the NPR 100, the 100 most important American musical works of the 20th century compiled by NPR editors, and was ranked #357 on the Songs of the Century, a list of the top 365 songs of the 20th century compiled by the Recording Industry Association of America and the National Endowment for the Arts.

== Notable versions ==
In 1992 Heath observed, "The original version with Kenny is of sentimental value but the one in the last concert is my favorite." Here all the elements of Lewis's skill and the MJQ's interpretive power are as one: the evocative Gypsy feeling in the main theme, recalling the Adagio of Mendelssohn's Octet; the eloquently stout bass motif; the congruence of delicacy and force, discipline and spontaneity, tragedy and joy.

— Gary Giddins

Apart from the 1954 recording, the Modern Jazz Quartet recorded "Django" on three other studio albums, 1960's Pyramid, 1965's Jazz Dialogue (with the All-Star Jazz Band), and 1987's Three Windows (with the New York Chamber Symphony). They also released it on the live albums European Concert, The Complete Last Concert, Reunion at Budokan 1981, Together Again: Live at the Montreux Jazz Festival '82, MJQ & Friends: A 40th Anniversary Celebration, and Dedicated to Connie. Lewis recorded the piece on solo piano on his album Evolution (1999) and with a small group on Evolution II (2000) and performed it with the violinist Svend Asmussen on European Encounter (1962) and with the vocalist Helen Merrill on Django (1976). He also arranged it for the Jazztet on The Jazztet and John Lewis (1961). Lewis and Gunther Schuller arranged the album The Modern Jazz Society Presents a Concert of Contemporary Music (1955), on which "Django" appears, and Schuller's 1961 album Jazz Abstractions contains three variations on "Django".

Other notable versions include those by:

- The Johnny Smith Quartet on The Johnny Smith Quartet (1955)
- The Vince Guaraldi Trio on Vince Guaraldi Trio (1956)
- The Ray Bryant Trio on Ray Bryant Trio (1957) and Con Alma (1961)
- Michel Legrand with Miles Davis on Legrand Jazz (1959)
- Gil Evans on Great Jazz Standards (1959)
- Dorothy Ashby on Dorothy Ashby (1962) and Django/Misty (1984)
- Stéphane Grappelli on Feeling + Finesse = Jazz (1962)
- Charlie Byrd on The Guitar Artistry of Charlie Byrd (1963)
- Joe Pass on For Django (1964) and What Is There to Say (1990)
- Grant Green on Idle Moments (1965)
- Oscar Peterson in a trio on Eloquence (1965) and solo on Tracks (1970)
- Blood, Sweat & Tears on No Sweat (1973; introduction only)
- Lindsey Buckingham and Stevie Nicks on Buckingham Nicks (1973; introduction only)
  - Madison Cunningham and Andrew Bird playing a re-interpreted Buckingham Nicks tribute version on Cunningham Bird (2024; introduction only)
- Tete Montoliu solo on Songs for Love (1974) and in a trio on The Man from Barcelona (1991)
- Bill Evans and Eddie Gómez on Montreux III (1975)
- Wynton Marsalis on Hot House Flowers (1984)
- Joe Sample on Invitation (1993)
- John McLaughlin with Jeff Beck on The Promise (1995)
- Gary Burton with Mulgrew Miller on For Hamp, Red, Bags, and Cal (2001)
- Roland Hanna Trio on Milano, Paris, New York: Finding John Lewis (2002)

== See also ==
- List of post-1950 jazz standards
