= Much in Common =

Studio album by Ray Brown and Milt Jackson
- Released: 1964
- Recorded: January 13–14, 1964
- Genre: Jazz
- Length: 36:55
- Label: Verve
- Producer: Jim Davis

Ray Brown chronology
| Ray Brown with the All-Star Big Band (1962) | Much in Common (1964) | Ray Brown / Milt Jackson (1965) |

Milt Jackson chronology
| The Sheriff (1964) | Much in Common (1964) | Collaboration (1964) |

Much in Common is an album by bassist Ray Brown and vibraphonist Milt Jackson recorded in 1964 and released on the Verve label.

== Reception ==
The Allmusic review by Michael G. Nastos awarded the album 3½ stars, describing "two jazz giants in the prime of their careers, playing music not readily identifiable aside from their work with Oscar Peterson (Brown) or MJQ (Jackson) around this time".

Professional ratings
Review scores
| Source | Rating |
|---|---|
| Allmusic | 3.5/5 stars |

== Track listing ==
1. "Much in Common" (Ray Brown)– 3:54
2. "When the Saints Go Marching In" (Traditional) – 3:58
3. "I'm Going to Live the Life I Sing About in My Song" (Thomas A. Dorsey) – 4:21
4. "Gravy Blues" (Ray Brown) – 3:31
5. "Swing Low, Sweet Chariot" (Traditional) – 2:47
6. "What Kind of Fool Am I?" (Leslie Bricusse, Anthony Newley) – 4:07
7. "Sometimes I Feel Like a Motherless Child" (Traditional) – 3:38
8. "Just for a Thrill" (Lil Hardin Armstrong, Don Raye) – 4:02
9. "Nancy (With the Laughing Face)" (Phil Silvers, Jimmy Van Heusen) – 3:37
10. "Give Me That Old Time Religion" (Traditional) – 2:00

- Recorded at A&R Studios in New York City on January 13 (tracks 1–3, 5, 7 & 10) & January 14 (tracks 4, 6, 8 & 9), 1964

== Personnel ==
- Milt Jackson – vibes
- Ray Brown – bass
- Kenny Burrell – guitar
- Wild Bill Davis – organ (tracks 1–3, 5, 7 & 10)
- Hank Jones – piano (tracks 4, 6, 8 & 9)
- Albert Heath – drums
- Marion Williams – vocals (tracks 2, 3, 5, 7 & 10)
