= Django (album) =

Studio album by Modern Jazz Quartet
- Released: 1956 (digitally remastered edition released 1987)
- Recorded: June 25, 1953 (4–7), New York, NY; December 23, 1954 (1,2,8) and January 9, 1955 (3), Hackensack, NJ
- Genre: Cool jazz Third stream Post bop
- Length: 39:00
- Label: Prestige Records
- Producer: Ira Gitler (4–7) and Bob Weinstock (1,2,3,8)

Modern Jazz Quartet chronology
Concorde (1955)	Django (1956)	Fontessa (1956)

Milt Jackson chronology
Meet Milt Jackson (1956)	Django (1956)	The Jazz Skyline (1956)

Django is an album by the Modern Jazz Quartet, first released on 12-inch LP in 1956.

== Overview ==
The actual sessions had taken place in June 1953, December 1954, and January 1955, and (as Prestige Records had yet to enter the 12-inch LP era) were first released on two 10-inch albums, entitled Modern Jazz Quartet (PRLP 160, 1953, whose second side contained "The Queen's Fancy", "Delauney's Dilemma", "Autumn In New York" and "But Not For Me") and The Modern Jazz Quartet, Vol. 2 (PRLP 170, 1955, containing "Django", "One Bass Hit", "Milano" and "La Ronde Suite"). The first session took place in New York, but the eventual Hackensack, New Jersey sessions were engineered by Rudy Van Gelder; the whole album was reissued in 2006 as part of the Rudy Van Gelder Remasters collection.

"Django" (like the other original material on the album) was composed by the group's pianist and musical director, John Lewis. It is one of his best-known compositions, written in memory of the Belgian Romani guitarist Django Reinhardt. Another tune is "Delauney's Dilemma", a jaunty tribute to the French jazz critic Charles Delaunay. The lengthy "La Ronde Suite", with discrete sections emphasizing each group member's contributions, is in fact a version of the standard "Two Bass Hit", written by Lewis for Dizzy Gillespie and recorded by, among others, Miles Davis on Milestones. Gillespie's own tune, "One Bass Hit", is also included as a feature for bassist Percy Heath.

Vibraphonist Milt "Bags" Jackson can be heard grunting and humming throughout the quieter numbers, which include renditions of the Gershwins' "But Not For Me" and the Vernon Duke standard "Autumn In New York".

== Reception ==
Professional ratings
Review scores
Source	Rating
Allmusic	4/5 stars
The Penguin Guide to Jazz Recordings	3.5/4 stars

Writing for All About Jazz, Douglas Payne described Django as "classic jazz in construction and execution" and said it was "the place to begin appreciating the many and great virtues of one of jazz's finest aggregates". AllMusic's Lindsay Planer wrote that "In terms of seminal Modern Jazz Quartet entries, it is hard to exceed the variety of styles and performances gathered on Django."

== Track listing ==
1. "Django" (John Lewis) – 7:03
2. "One Bass Hit" (Dizzy Gillespie) – 2:59
3. "La Ronde Suite" (Lewis) – 9:38
4. "The Queen's Fancy" (Lewis) – 3:12
5. "Delauney's Dilemma" (Lewis) – 4:01
6. "Autumn In New York" (Vernon Duke) – 3:40
7. "But Not for Me" (George Gershwin, Ira Gershwin) – 3:44
8. "Milano" (Lewis) – 4:23

== Personnel ==
- Milt Jackson — vibraphone
- John Lewis — piano
- Percy Heath — bass
- Kenny Clarke — drums
