= Improvised Meditations and Excursions =

Improvised Meditations & Excursions

Studio album by John Lewis
- Released: 1959
- Recorded: May 7–8, 1959
- Genre: Jazz
- Label: Atlantic; SD-1313 (stereo), 1313 (mono)
- Producer: Nesuhi Ertegun

John Lewis chronology
European Windows (1958)	Improvised Meditations & Excursions (1959)	Odds Against Tomorrow (Soundtrack) (1959)

Professional ratings
Review scores
Source	Rating
AllMusic	4/5 stars

Improvised Meditations & Excursions is a jazz recording by John Lewis released in 1959.

== Track listing ==
All tracks composed by John Lewis, except where indicated.

=== Side 1 ===
1. "Now's the Time" (Charlie Parker)
2. "Smoke Gets in Your Eyes" (Jerome Kern)
3. "Delaunay's Dilemma"
4. "Love Me"

=== Side 2 ===
1. "Yesterdays" (Jerome Kern)
2. "How Long Has This Been Going On" (George Gershwin)
3. "September Song" (Kurt Weill, Maxwell Anderson)

== Liner notes ==
The liner notes by Horst Lippmann, a German jazz critic of the time, provide additional notes and influences in Lewis' jazz work on this and some of his other releases.

== Personnel ==
On "Now's The Time", "Smoke Gets In Your Eyes", "Delaunay's Dilemma" and "September Song":

- John Lewis – piano
- George Duvivier – bass
- Connie Kay – drums

On "Love Me", "Yesterdays" and "How Long Has This Been Going On":

- John Lewis – piano
- Percy Heath – bass
- Connie Kay – drums

All tracks engineered by Earle Brown and Frank Abbey.
