= Sunflower (Milt Jackson album) =

Studio album by Milt Jackson
- Released: 1973
- Recorded: December 12–13, 1972
- Studios: Van Gelder Studio, Englewood Cliffs, NJ
- Genre: Jazz
- Length: 42:42
- Label: CTI
- Producer: Creed Taylor

Milt Jackson chronology
The Legendary Profile (1972)	Sunflower (1973)	In Memoriam (1974)

Sunflower is an album by vibraphonist Milt Jackson recorded in 1972 and released on the CTI label. Assisting Jackson are trumpeter Freddie Hubbard, a star-studded rhythm section composed chiefly of Miles Davis alumni, and, on the first track, string and woodwind accompaniment, courtesy of Don Sebesky.

In 1997, Sunflower was reissued on compact disc under Sony Music Entertainment through their catalog label Legacy Recordings and Epic Records.

== Reception ==
The Allmusic review by Thom Jurek awarded the album 4½ stars stating "While Sunflower sometimes feels more like a group session rather than a Jackson-led one, that's part of its exquisite beauty". Reviewing a 1979 LP reissue for The Los Angeles Times, jazz writer Leonard Feather assigned it 4 stars, noting that "[t]he reissues on CTI continue to remind us how much vibrant talent was brought together on that label in its pre-fusion days."

Professional ratings
Review scores
Source	Rating
Allmusic	4.5/5 stars
Los Angeles Times	4/5 stars

== Track listing ==
All compositions by Milt Jackson except where noted

1. "For Someone I Love (What's Your Story)" - 10:20
2. "What Are You Doing the Rest of Your Life?" (Alan Bergman, Marilyn Bergman, Michel Legrand) - 7:06
3. "People Make the World Go Round" (Thom Bell, Linda Creed) - 8:28
4. "Sunflower" (Freddie Hubbard) - 10:01
5. "SKJ" - 6:47 Bonus track on CD reissue
- Recorded at Rudy Van Gelder Studio in Englewood Cliffs, New Jersey on December 12 & 13, 1972

== Personnel ==
- Milt Jackson – vibes
- Freddie Hubbard - trumpet, flugelhorn
- Herbie Hancock - piano
- Jay Berliner - guitar
- Ron Carter - bass
- Billy Cobham - drums
- Ralph MacDonald - percussion
- Romeo Penque - alto flute, English horn, oboe
- Phil Bodner - flute, alto flute, piccolo, English horn
- George Marge - clarinet, bass clarinet, alto flute, English horn
- Max Ellen, Paul Gershman, Emanuel Green, Charles Libove, Joe Malin, David Nadien, Gene Orloff, Elliot Rosoff, Irving Spice - violin
- Charles McCraken, George Ricci, Alan Shulman - cello
- Margaret Ross - harp
- Don Sebesky - arranger, conductor
