= Reunion at Budokan 1981 =

Live album by Modern Jazz Quartet
- Released: 1981
- Recorded: October 19–20, 1981
- Venue: Nippon Budokan, Tokyo, Japan
- Genre: Jazz
- Length: 50:35
- Label: Atlantic, Pablo
- Producer: John Lewis, Ikuzo Orita

Modern Jazz Quartet chronology
Concert in Japan '66 (1976)	Reunion at Budokan 1981 (1981)	Together Again: Live at the Montreux Jazz Festival '82 (1982)

Professional ratings
Review scores
Source	Rating
Allmusic	4/5 stars

Reunion at Budokan 1981 is a live album by American jazz group the Modern Jazz Quartet featuring performances recorded at their reunion concert at the Nippon Budokan in 1981 and released on the Pablo label.

== Reception ==
The Allmusic review stated "the group's two biggest 'hits', "Bags' Groove" and "Django" are among the highlights of this excellent release".

== Track listing ==
All compositions by John Lewis except as indicated

1. Introduction - 3:01
2. "Softly, as in a Morning Sunrise" (Oscar Hammerstein II, Sigmund Romberg) - 6:07
3. "The Cylinder" (Milt Jackson) - 5:32
4. "Really True Blues" (Jackson) - 5:37
5. "The Golden Striker" - 5:53
6. "Odds Against Tomorrow" - 9:09
7. "The Jasmin Tree" - 4:04
8. "Bags' Groove" (Jackson) - 5:41
9. "Django" - 5:31

== Personnel ==
The Modern Jazz Quartet

- Milt Jackson - vibraphone
- John Lewis - piano
- Percy Heath - bass
- Connie Kay - drums

Production

- Ikuzo Orita – producer
- John Lewis – producer
- Hiroki Imao – executive producer
- Yuichi Shima – engineer
- Keishi Akasaka – design (cover)
