= Dedicated to Connie =

Live album by Modern Jazz Quartet
- Released: 1995
- Recorded: May 27, 1960
- Venue: Ljubljana, Slovenia
- Genre: Jazz
- Length: 118:32
- Label: Atlantic 7567-82763-2
- Producer: Ahmet Ertegun & John Lewis

Modern Jazz Quartet chronology
MJQ & Friends: A 40th Anniversary Celebration (1994)	Dedicated to Connie (1995)	In A Crowd (1997)

Dedicated to Connie is a live album by American jazz group the Modern Jazz Quartet featuring performances recorded in Slovenia in May 1960 and released in 1995 on the Atlantic label following drummer Connie Kay's death. The album was also released by Jazz Life in 1990 as Modern Jazz Quartet In Concert.

== Reception ==
Professional ratings
Review scores
Source	Rating
Allmusic	4.5/5 stars
Penguin Guide to Jazz	4/4 stars

The Allmusic reviewer commented: "Lewis has stated that the group never played better than during this concert. Although that statement is debatable, the MJQ certainly sounds in prime form throughout the easily recommended release".

The Penguin Guide to Jazz awarded the release a "Crown" signifying a recording that the authors "feel a special admiration or affection for".

== Track listing ==
All compositions by John Lewis except as indicated

Disc One:

1. "The Little Comedy/La Cantatrice/Harlequin/Fontessa" - 23:05
2. "'Round Midnight" (Thelonious Monk) - 4:09
3. "The Cylinder" (Milt Jackson) - 6:02
4. "Bags' Groove" (Jackson) - 5:28
5. "Odds Against Tomorrow" - 8:12
6. "It Don't Mean a Thing (If It Ain't Got That Swing)" (Duke Ellington, Irving Mills) - 5:13
7. "A Social Call" (Gigi Gryce) - 4:52

Disc Two

1. "Django" - 4:40
2. "I Should Care" (Sammy Cahn, Axel Stordahl, Paul Weston) - 6:14
3. "How High the Moon" (Nancy Hamilton, Morgan Lewis) - 7:51
4. "Colombine/Pulcinella" - 9:22
5. "Spanish Steps" - 4:08
6. "Pyramid (Blues for Junior)" (Ray Brown) - 10:41
7. "Milt Meets Sid" (Jackson) - 3:40
8. "I Remember Clifford" (Benny Golson, Jon Hendricks) - 6:03
9. "Vendome" - 2:42 MOG
10. "Skating in Central Park" - 6:10

== Personnel ==
- Milt Jackson - vibraphone
- John Lewis - piano
- Percy Heath - bass
- Connie Kay - drums
