= Topsy: This One's for Basie =

Studio album by Modern Jazz Quartet
- Released: 1985
- Recorded: June 3–4, 1985
- Studio: RCA Studios, NYC
- Genre: Jazz
- Length: 43:11
- Label: Pablo 2310-917
- Producer: John Lewis

Modern Jazz Quartet chronology
Echoes (1984)	Topsy: This One's for Basie (1985)	Three Windows (1987)

Professional ratings
Review scores
Source	Rating
Allmusic	4/5 stars
The Penguin Guide to Jazz Recordings	3/4 stars

Topsy: This One's for Basie is an album by American jazz group the Modern Jazz Quartet featuring performances recorded in 1985 and released on the Pablo label.

== Reception ==
The Allmusic review stated "Overall this CD gives listeners a fine example of the music of The MJQ during the 1980s".

== Track listing ==
All compositions by John Lewis except as indicated

1. "Reunion Blues" (Milt Jackson) - 4:09
2. "Nature Boy" (eden ahbez) - 5:03
3. "Topsy Part 2" (Edgar Battle, Eddie Durham) - 4:40
4. "D and E" - 8:27
5. "Valeria" - 6:46
6. "Milano" - 5:50
7. "Le Cannet" - 8:16

== Personnel ==
- Milt Jackson - vibraphone
- John Lewis - piano
- Percy Heath - bass
- Connie Kay - drums
