= Fontessa =

Studio album by Modern Jazz Quartet
- Released: 1956
- Recorded: January 22 and February 14, 1956
- Studio: New York City and Van Gelder Studio, Englewood Cliffs, NJ
- Genre: Jazz
- Length: 36:28
- Label: Atlantic
- Producer: Nesuhi Ertegun

Modern Jazz Quartet chronology
Django (1956)	Fontessa (1956)	At Music Inn (1956)

Milt Jackson chronology
Ballads & Blues (1956)	Fontessa (1956)	At Music Inn (1956)

Fontessa is a 1956 album by the Modern Jazz Quartet released on Atlantic Records. It was the first of their albums released on Atlantic. The album was released in the USA in mono on the black Atlantic label with catalogue number 1231. It was released in the USA in stereo on the green Atlantic label with catalogue number SD 1231. The prefix SD stands for Stereo Disc. The current internationally available CD release is the mono version. A Japanese CD exists of the stereo version. Additionally both mono and stereo versions were released in many other territories, for example the UK with London LTZ-K 15022 for the mono and London SAH-K 6031 for the stereo. The 11-minute title tune by the group's pianist and musical director John Lewis was inspired by Commedia dell'arte, and the four characters depicted in it are pictured on the cover. Lewis wrote of it in the liner notes:

Fontessa is a little suite inspired by the Renaissance Commedia dell’Arte. I had particularly in mind their plays which consisted of a very sketchy plot and in which the details, the lines, etc. were improvised. This suite consists first of a short Prelude to raise the curtain and provide the theme. The first piece after the Prelude has the character of older jazz and improvised parts are by the vibraphone. This piece could perhaps be the character of Harlequin. The second piece has the character of less older jazz and the improvised parts are played by the piano. The character here could perhaps be Pierrot. The third piece is of a still later jazz character and develops the main motif. The improvised parts are by the drums. This character could perhaps be Pantaloon. The opening Prelude closes the suite. Fontessa is the three-note main motif of the suite and is perhaps a substitute for the character of Colombine.

— John Lewis

The Modern Jazz Quartet later made a full album based on this theme, The Comedy (1962). The title track was released on a 45-rpm 7-inch EP with the track being split across the two sides.

The mono version of the album has a good recorded sound quality as one would expect from an important 1956 jazz release. The stereo version is marred by a number of technical flaws. The first of these is a very powerful mains hum consisting of a 60 Hz tone and its harmonics at 120 Hz and 180 Hz. The second flaw is a remarkably high level of tape hiss. Lastly, the level of the bass playing is much lower than that of the mono release. The combination of these errors would seem to suggest that the stereo recording was experimental in nature and that these recordings were probably only released after commercial pressure for a stereo version. The quality of the stereo image is high despite these flaws and it is possible to get a true sense of space and position of the players.

Track 5, "Bluesology", features a different take on the mono and stereo versions of the record. A recent multi-CD retrospective release featured the mono version of the album, with the stereo version of this tune as a bonus track.

== Reception ==
Professional ratings
Review scores
Source	Rating
Allmusic	4.5/5 stars
The Rolling Stone Jazz Record Guide	5/5 stars
The Penguin Guide to Jazz Recordings	3.5/4 stars

The Allmusic review described the album as "a particularly strong all-around set", saying that Lewis's "Versailles" and the title track "show the seriousness of the group (and the influence of Western classical music)", while other pieces "look toward the group's roots in bop and permit the band to swing hard". It was ranked No. 25 on a list of "The 100 Jazz Albums That Shook The World" compiled by the British jazz magazine Jazzwise; they said the album "delivered a perfect blueprint for the many MJQ advances of the next decade".

== Track listing ==
1. "Versailles" (John Lewis) – 3:22
2. "Angel Eyes" (Earl Brent, Matt Dennis) – 3:48
3. "Fontessa" (Lewis) – 11:12
4. "Over the Rainbow" (Harold Arlen, E.Y. Harburg) – 3:50
5. "Bluesology" (Milt Jackson) – 5:04
6. "Willow Weep for Me" (Ann Ronell) – 4:47
7. "Woody 'n' You" (Dizzy Gillespie) – 4:25

== Personnel ==
- John Lewis – piano
- Milt Jackson – vibraphone
- Percy Heath – double bass
- Connie Kay – drums
