= The Complete Last Concert =

Live album by Modern Jazz Quartet
- Released: 1988 (complete), 1975 (initial)
- Recorded: November 25, 1974
- Venue: Avery Fisher Hall, New York City
- Genre: Jazz
- Length: 148:05
- Label: Atlantic 81976-2
- Producer: İlhan Mimaroğlu

Modern Jazz Quartet chronology
Three Windows (1987)	The Complete Last Concert (1988)	For Ellington (1988)

Modern Jazz Quartet chronology
Blues on Bach (1974)	The Last Concert (1975)	Concert in Japan '66 (1976)

Milt Jackson chronology
Olinga (1974)	The Last Concert (1975)	The Milt Jackson Big 4 (1975)

More from the Last Concert

Professional ratings
Review scores
Source	Rating
AllMusic	5/5 stars
The Penguin Guide to Jazz Recordings	3.5/4 stars
The Rolling Stone Jazz Record Guide	4/5 stars

The Complete Last Concert is a double CD live album by American jazz group the Modern Jazz Quartet featuring performances recorded at Avery Fisher Hall in 1974 and released on the Atlantic label originally as a double album The Last Concert (1975) and More from the Last Concert (1981) before the complete edition was released in 1988.

== Reception ==
The AllMusic review stated, "The Modern Jazz Quartet broke up after the concert documented on this double CD. It would be nearly seven years before the group got back together again but it certainly went out on top". The Penguin Guide to Jazz Recordings includes the album in its suggested core collection.

== Track listing ==
All compositions by John Lewis except as indicated

Disc One:

1. "Softly, as in a Morning Sunrise" (Oscar Hammerstein II, Sigmund Romberg) - 6:25
2. "The Cylinder" (Milt Jackson) - 5:28
3. "Summertime" (George Gershwin, Ira Gershwin, DuBose Heyward) - 7:49
4. "Really True Blues" (Jackson) - 5:27
5. "What's New?" (Johnny Burke, Bob Haggart) - 7:12
6. "Blues in A Minor" - 7:46
7. "Confirmation" (Charlie Parker) - 4:53
8. "'Round Midnight" (Thelonious Monk) - 7:34
9. "A Night in Tunisia" (Dizzy Gillespie, Frank Paparelli) - 5:21
10. "Tears from the Children" (Johann Sebastian Bach) - 5:00
11. "Blues in H (B)" (Jackson) - 5:28
12. "England's Carol" - 5:42

Disc Two:

1. "The Golden Striker" - 5:26
2. "One Never Knows" - 7:23
3. "Trav'lin'" - 5:38
4. "Skating in Central Park" - 6:32
5. "The Legendary Profile" (Jackson) - 4:30
6. "Concierto de Aranjuez" (Joaquín Rodrigo) - 10:50
7. "The Jasmine Tree" - 4:05
8. "In Memoriam" - 16:47
9. "Django" - 6:09
10. "Bags' Groove" (Jackson) - 6:40

== Personnel ==
- Milt Jackson - vibraphone
- John Lewis - piano
- Percy Heath - bass
- Connie Kay - drums
