= Concorde (album) =

Studio album by Modern Jazz Quartet
- Released: 1955 (digitally remastered edition released 1995)
- Recorded: July 2, 1955
- Studio: Van Gelder Studio, Hackensack, New Jersey
- Genre: Cool jazz Third stream Post bop
- Length: 35:38
- Label: Prestige; PR 7005
- Producer: Ira Gitler and Bob Weinstock

Modern Jazz Quartet chronology
Wizard of the Vibes (1952)	Concorde (1955)	Django (1956)

Milt Jackson chronology
Milt Jackson Quartet (1955)	Concorde (1955)	Roll 'Em Bags (1956)

Concorde is an album by the Modern Jazz Quartet, recorded in New York on July 2, 1955, and first released that year as an LP, Prestige 7005, with liner notes by Ira Gitler. The album was reissued in 2008 as part of the Rudy Van Gelder Remasters collection.

The album is the first to feature drummer Connie Kay, who replaced Kenny Clarke in 1955. It is also the first Modern Jazz Quartet LP conceived from the beginning as a long playing record; previous MJQ recordings had been released as 78's, 10 inch 33's or reissues of these formats on a 12-inch LP. The liner notes acknowledge the additional playing time of the LP format by asking the listener to regard this album as a performance set "at one of America's leading jazz rooms".

== Reception ==
Professional ratings
Review scores
Source	Rating
AllMusic	4/5 stars
The Rolling Stone Jazz Record Guide	5/5 stars
The Penguin Guide to Jazz Recordings	3/4 stars

Writing for AllMusic, Lindsay Planer described the transition between percussionists as "both smooth and sensible". He highlighted the interpretation of the songs in the Gershwin medley as "nothing short of definitive", saying that "All manner of post-bop jazz listeners will find much to enjoy throughout Concorde."

== Track listing ==
1. "Ralph's New Blues" (Milt Jackson) – 7:08
2. "All of You" (Cole Porter) – 4:31
3. "I'll Remember April" (Gene de Paul, Patricia Johnston, Don Raye) – 5:09
4. "Gershwin Medley: Soon; For You, for Me, for Evermore; Love Walked In; Our Love Is Here to Stay" (George Gershwin, Ira Gershwin) – 7:54
5. "Softly, as in a Morning Sunrise" (Oscar Hammerstein II, Sigmund Romberg) – 7:54 (Note: The eight-bar introduction to this track (and the outro) are adapted from the canon a 2 Violini in unisono movement of The Musical Offering by Johann Sebastian Bach.)
6. "Concorde" (John Lewis) – 3:42

== Personnel ==
- Milt Jackson – vibraphone
- John Lewis – piano
- Percy Heath – bass
- Connie Kay – drums
