= Billie's Bounce =

Composition by Charlie Parker
- Released: 1945
- Recorded: November 1945
- Genre: Jazz
- Label: Savoy
- Composer: Charlie Parker

"Billie's Bounce" (also known as "Bill's Bounce") is a jazz composition written in 1945 by Charlie Parker in the form of a 12 bar F blues. Some sources claim that the song was dedicated to Dizzy Gillespie's agent, Billy Shaw, although according to Ross Russell, Shaw's "name was misspelled" accidentally. However, others claim that the song was in fact dedicated to Shaw's secretary, who was called Billie. The original recording by Charlie Parker and His Re-Boppers was inducted into the Grammy Hall of Fame in 2002.

Originally an instrumental, lyrics were added later by Jon Hendricks and by Eddie Jefferson.

== Personnel ==
The original 1945 recording was performed by the following lineup:

- Charlie Parker – E♭ alto saxophone
- Miles Davis – B♭ trumpet
- Dizzy Gillespie – piano (Gillespie also plays trumpet in other recordings from the same session)
- Curley Russell – bass
- Max Roach – drums

== Renditions ==
- Ben Webster and the Modern Jazz Quartet – 1953: An Exceptional Encounter (1953)
- Shelly Manne – The Three and the Two (1954)
- Metronome All-Stars – Metronome All-Stars 1956 (1956)
- Stan Getz and J. J. Johnson – Stan Getz and J.J. Johnson at the Opera House (1957)
- Wes Montgomery – Fingerpickin (1957)
- Bud Powell – Bud Plays Bird (1958)
- Red Garland – Dig It! (recorded in 1957–58, released in 1962)
- Betty Roche – Singin' & Swingin' (1960)
- Clare Fischer – Surging Ahead (1963)
- Don Byas – Anthropology (1963)
- Dexter Gordon – Billie's Bounce (1964)
- Albert Ayler – My Name Is Albert Ayler (Debut, 1964)
- George Benson – Giblet Gravy (1968)
- Vince Guaraldi Trio – It's a Mystery, Charlie Brown (soundtrack) (recorded 1973, released 2026)
- Ella Fitzgerald – Montreux '77 (1977)
- Johnny Griffin – Birds and Ballads (1978)
- Robert Wyatt – Radio Experiment Rome, February 1981 (recorded 1981, released 2009)
- Bobby Enriquez, with Abraham Laboriel, Alex Acuna, and Poncho Sanchez –The Prodigious Piano of Bobby Enriquez (1981)
- Keith Jarrett – Still Live (1986); Tokyo '96 (1998)
- Milcho Leviev and Dave Holland – Up & Down (1987)
- Manfred Mann's Earth Band – Masque (1987)
- Oscar Peterson – Encore at the Blue Note (1990)
- Dizzy Gillespie – To Bird with Love (Telarc, 1992)
- David Murray – Saxmen (1993)
- Tina May – Tina May – Live in Paris (2000)
- The Stimulators – Style (2006)
- Frank Morgan – A Night in the Life (2007)

== See also ==
Charlie Parker's Savoy and Dial Sessions
