= Plastic Dreams (album) =

Studio album by Modern Jazz Quartet
- Released: 1971
- Recorded: May 24, 1971; New York City
- Genre: Jazz
- Length: 36:23
- Label: Atlantic 1589
- Producer: Arif Mardin

Modern Jazz Quartet chronology
Space (1969)	Plastic Dreams (1971)	The Legendary Profile (1972)

Milt Jackson chronology
Memphis Jackson (1970)	Plastic Dreams (1971)	Reunion Blues (1972)

Professional ratings
Review scores
Source	Rating
Allmusic	3.5/5 stars
The Penguin Guide to Jazz Recordings	3/4 stars

Plastic Dreams is an album by American jazz group the Modern Jazz Quartet, augmented by a brass section on three tracks, recorded in 1971 and released on the Atlantic label.

== Reception ==
At the time of its original release the Gramophone reviewer stated "Plastic Dreams is an auspicious release for it lacks much of the pretentiousness which I have learned to dread ever since I first saw the Quartet in Paris in 1956".

The Allmusic review stated "Plastic Dreams has never been a critic's favorite, and was an album that mystified many of the group's longtime followers... Plastic Dreams was as close as the MJQ ever got to making a pop album... Indeed, as a whole Plastic Dreams does seem like a final refinement of several idealistic threads found throughout the MJQ's studio work stretching back to about 1960, with generous room made for new directions".

== Track listing ==
All compositions by John Lewis except as indicated

1. "Walkin' Stomp" - 4:45
2. "Dancing" (Milt Jackson) - 5:14
3. "Plastic Dreams" - 5:22
4. "Variations on a Christmas Theme" (Traditional, arranged Lewis) - 4:25
5. "Trav'lin'" - 4:41
6. "Piazza Navona" - 6:36
7. "England's Carol" (Traditional, arranged Lewis) - 5:20

== Personnel ==
- Milt Jackson - vibraphone
- John Lewis - piano, harpsichord
- Percy Heath - bass
- Connie Kay - drums
- Joe Newman, Snooky Young - trumpet (tracks 4–6)
- Garnett Brown - trombone (tracks 4–6)
- Jimmy Buffington - French horn (tracks 4–6)
- Don Butterfield - tuba (tracks 4–6)
