= The Legendary Profile =

Studio album by Modern Jazz Quartet
- Released: 1972
- Recorded: June 1, 1972
- Studio: Atlantic Recording Studios, New York City
- Genre: Jazz
- Length: 35:37
- Label: Atlantic 1623
- Producer: John Lewis

Modern Jazz Quartet chronology
Plastic Dreams (1971)	The Legendary Profile (1972)	In Memoriam (1974)

Milt Jackson chronology
Cherry (1972)	The Legendary Profile (1972)	Sunflower (1973)

Professional ratings
Review scores
Source	Rating
Allmusic	3/5 stars
The Rolling Stone Jazz Record Guide	3/5 stars

The Legendary Profile is an album by American jazz group the Modern Jazz Quartet recorded in 1972 and released on the Atlantic label.

== Reception ==
The Allmusic review stated "This is an MJQ album that, for most fans, is somewhat off their beaten path. At a time when they had left Apple records, returning to the Atlantic label, and when fusion was just getting started, the group incorporates more Brazilian music in the mix, and John Lewis plays Fender Rhodes electric piano on two tracks... Not an essential item in their catalog, this is reserved strictly for completists".

== Track listing ==
All compositions by John Lewis except as indicated

1. "The Legendary Profile" (Milt Jackson) - 4:53
2. "Valeria" - 4:30
3. "Misty Roses" (Tim Hardin) - 6:54
4. "The Martyr" (Jackson) - 6:41
5. "What Now My Love (Et Maintenant)" (Gilbert Bécaud, Carl Sigman) - 5:42
6. "Romance" - 6:57

== Personnel ==
The Modern Jazz Quartet

- Milt Jackson - vibraphone
- John Lewis - piano, electric piano
- Percy Heath - bass
- Connie Kay - drums

Production

- John Lewis – producer
- Lew Hahn – engineer
- Richard Mantel – art direction, design
- Buddy Endress – photography
