= Together Again: Live at the Montreux Jazz Festival '82 =

Together Again! Live at the Montreux Jazz Festival '82

Live album by Modern Jazz Quartet
- Released: 1982 (Japan), 1985 (US)
- Recorded: July 25, 1982
- Venue: Montreux Jazz Festival, Montreux, Switzerland
- Genre: Jazz
- Length: 51:09
- Label: Pablo Live; Japan: 28MJ 3212; US: D 2308-244
- Producer: Norman Granz

Modern Jazz Quartet chronology
Reunion at Budokan 1981 (1981)	Together Again! Live at the Montreux Jazz Festival '82 (1982)	Echoes (1984)

Milt Jackson chronology
Memories of Thelonious Sphere Monk (1982)	Together Again! Live at the Montreux Jazz Festival '82 (1982)	Two of the Few (1983)

Professional ratings
Review scores
Source	Rating
Allmusic	4/5 stars
The Penguin Guide to Jazz Recordings	2.5/4 stars

Together Again: Live at the Montreux Jazz Festival '82 is a live album by American jazz group the Modern Jazz Quartet featuring performances recorded at the Montreux Jazz Festival in 1982 and released on the Pablo label.

== Reception ==
The Allmusic review stated "the band still had its enthusiasm and the ability to make the veteran material sound fresh and swinging".

== Track listing ==
All compositions by John Lewis except as indicated

1. "Django" - 5:47
2. "The Cylinder" (Milt Jackson) - 5:18
3. "The Martyr" (Jackson) - 8:43
4. "Really True Blues" (Jackson) - 5:39
5. "Odds Against Tomorrow" - 8:53
6. "The Jasmine Tree" - 4:42
7. "Monterey Mist" (Jackson) - 4:05
8. "Bags' New Groove" (Jackson) - 4:15
9. "Woody 'n' You" (Dizzy Gillespie) - 3:47

== Personnel ==
The Modern Jazz Quartet

- Milt Jackson - vibraphone
- John Lewis - piano
- Percy Heath - bass
- Connie Kay - drums

Production

- Norman Granz – producer
- Joe Tarantino – engineer (mastering)
- Nobuharu Kondo – photography
