= The Modern Jazz Quartet & Orchestra =

Studio album by Modern Jazz Quartet
- Released: 1961
- Recorded: June 3–4, 1960; Stuttgart, West Germany
- Genre: Jazz
- Length: 42:16
- Label: Atlantic 1359
- Producer: Nesuhi Ertegun

Modern Jazz Quartet chronology
European Concert (1960)	The Modern Jazz Quartet & Orchestra (1961)	The Comedy (1962)

Milt Jackson chronology
Bags & Trane (1961)	The Modern Jazz Quartet & Orchestra (1961)	Very Tall (1962)

Professional ratings
Review scores
Source	Rating
Allmusic	4/5 stars

The Modern Jazz Quartet & Orchestra is an album by American jazz group the Modern Jazz Quartet featuring performances recorded in West Germany in 1960 with an Orchestra and released on the Atlantic label.

== Reception ==
The Allmusic review stated "this is a successful effort worth listening to several times".

== Track listing ==
All compositions by John Lewis except as indicated

1. "Around the Blues" (Andre Hodeir) - 8:25
2. "Divertimento" (Werner Heider) - 8:17
3. "England's Carol" - 6:20
4. "Concertino for Jazz Quartet and Orchestra: First Movement" (Gunther Schuller) - 6:42
5. "Concertino for Jazz Quartet and Orchestra: Second Movement - Passacaglia" (Schuller) - 6:38
6. "Concertino for Jazz Quartet and Orchestra: Third Movement" (Schuller) - 5:54

== Personnel ==
- Milt Jackson – vibraphone
- John Lewis – piano
- Percy Heath – bass
- Connie Kay – drums
- Unnamed orchestra conducted by Werner Heider and Gunther Schuller
