= For Ellington =

Studio album by Modern Jazz Quartet
- Released: 1988
- Recorded: February 1–3, 1988; New York City
- Genre: Jazz
- Length: 51:32
- Label: East West 90926-2
- Producer: Nesuhi Ertegun

Modern Jazz Quartet chronology
The Complete Last Concert (1988)	For Ellington (1988)	MJQ & Friends: A 40th Anniversary Celebration (1994)

Professional ratings
Review scores
Source	Rating
Allmusic	4/5 stars

For Ellington is a tribute album by American jazz group the Modern Jazz Quartet featuring performances of compositions associated with Duke Ellington recorded in 1988 and released on the East West label.

== Reception ==
The Allmusic review stated "This is a tribute album that works quite well... The ballads sometimes get a little sleepy but on a whole this is a very enjoyable release".

== Track listing ==
All compositions by Duke Ellington except as indicated

1. "For Ellington" (John Lewis) - 8:01
2. "Jack the Bear" - 5:04
3. "Prelude to a Kiss" (Ellington, Irving Gordon, Irving Mills) - 5:05
4. "It Don't Mean a Thing (If It Ain't Got That Swing)" (Ellington, Mills) - 5:45
5. "Ko Ko" - 5:44
6. "Maestro E.K.E." (Milt Jackson) - 5:37
7. "Sepia Panorama" - 5:32
8. "Rockin' in Rhythm" (Harry Carney, Ellington, Mills) - 6:33
9. "Come Sunday" - 4:11

== Personnel ==
- Milt Jackson - vibraphone
- John Lewis - piano
- Percy Heath - bass
- Connie Kay - drums, percussion
