= Echoes (Modern Jazz Quartet album) =

Album by American jazz group the Modern Jazz Quartet

Studio album by Modern Jazz Quartet
- Released: 1984
- Recorded: March 6, 1984; New York City
- Genre: Jazz
- Length: 44:51
- Label: Pablo Today 2312-142
- Producer: Modern Jazz Quartet

Modern Jazz Quartet chronology
| Together Again: Live at the Montreux Jazz Festival '82 (1982) | Echoes (1984) | Topsy: This One's for Basie (1985) |

Professional ratings
Review scores
| Source | Rating |
|---|---|
| Allmusic | 4.5/5 stars |
| The Penguin Guide to Jazz Recordings | 3/4 stars |

Echoes is an album by American jazz group the Modern Jazz Quartet featuring performances recorded in 1984 and released on the Pablo label.

== Reception ==
The Allmusic review stated "The MJQ's return was one of the happiest events in jazz of the 1980s".

== Track listing ==
All compositions by John Lewis except as indicated

| No. | Title | Writer(s) | Length |
|---|---|---|---|
| 1. | "That Slavic Smile" | | 8:00 |
| 2. | "Echoes" | Milt Jackson | 7:08 |
| 3. | "The Watergate Blues" | Percy Heath | 6:04 |
| 4. | "The Hornpipe" | | 8:16 |
| 5. | "Connie's Blues" | Milt Jackson | 7:29 |
| 6. | "Sacha's March" | | 7:54 |

== Personnel ==
- Milt Jackson - vibraphone
- John Lewis - piano
- Percy Heath - bass
- Connie Kay - drums
