= Vibrations (Milt Jackson album) =

Studio album by Milt Jackson
- Released: 1964
- Recorded: February 23–24, 1960; March 14, 1961
- Genre: Jazz
- Length: 36:26
- Label: Atlantic
- Producer: Nesuhi Ertegun

Milt Jackson chronology
| Invitation (1963) | Vibrations (1964) | The Sheriff (1964) |

Vibrations is an album by vibraphonist Milt Jackson featuring performances recorded in 1960 and 1961 and released on the Atlantic label in 1964.

== Reception ==
The Allmusic review awarded the album 3 stars.

Professional ratings
Review scores
| Source | Rating |
|---|---|
| Allmusic | 3/5 stars |

== Track listing ==
All compositions by Milt Jackson except as indicated

1. "Darbin and The Redd Fox" (James Moody) - 4:56
2. "Algo Bueno" (Dizzy Gillespie) - 4:12
3. "Mallets Towards None" (Tom McIntosh) - 4:33
4. "Blue Jubilee" (McIntosh) - 4:27
5. "Vibrations" - 3:57
6. "Let Me Hear the Blues" - 6:04
7. "Melancholy Blues" - 3:20
8. "Sweet Georgia Brown" (Ben Bernie, Maceo Pinkard, Kenneth Casey) - 4:57

- Recorded in New York City on February 23, 1960 (tracks 3 & 4), February 24, 1960 (tracks 1, 2, 6 & 8) and March 14, 1961 (tracks 5 & 7)

== Personnel ==
- Milt Jackson – vibes
- Henry Boozier – trumpet (tracks 1–4 & 8)
- Tom McIntosh – trombone (tracks 1–4 & 8)
- Jimmy Heath – tenor saxophone (tracks 1–4, 6 & 8)
- Tate Houston – baritone saxophone (tracks 1–4 & 8)
- Kenny Burrell – guitar (tracks 5 & 7)
- Tommy Flanagan – piano
- George Duvivier (tracks 5 & 7), Alvin Jackson (tracks 1–4, 6 & 8) – bass
- Connie Kay – drums
