= Music from Odds Against Tomorrow =

Soundtrack album by Modern Jazz Quartet
- Released: 1959
- Recorded: October 9–10, 1959
- Studio: Olmsted Sound Studios, New York City
- Genre: Jazz
- Length: 32:12
- Label: United Artists; UAL 4063, 4072, 5072

Modern Jazz Quartet chronology
At Music Inn Volume 2 (1959)	Music from Odds Against Tomorrow (1959)	Third Stream Music (1960)

Milt Jackson chronology
The Ballad Artistry of Milt Jackson (1959)	Music from Odds Against Tomorrow (1959)	Third Stream Music (1960)

Patterns cover

Professional ratings
Review scores
Source	Rating
Allmusic	4.5/5 stars
Record Mirror	3/5 stars

Music from Odds Against Tomorrow (also released as Patterns) is an album by American jazz group the Modern Jazz Quartet featuring interpretations of the soundtrack score for the 1959 motion picture Odds Against Tomorrow. It was released on United Artists Records, the label that the films' production company United Artists had founded two years earlier for its film soundtracks. The album was recorded with the Modern Jazz Quartet and a 22-piece orchestra.

Pianist John Lewis wrote and arranged the original score. Although he had already written music for No Sun in Venice, this was the first time Lewis—given early 16 mm film proofs—composed along the story-line rather than delivering “a set of isolated pieces”. Gunther Schuller, who organized the orchestra for the original soundtrack recordings, noticed that “it can serve its purpose in the film. But it can also stand as absolute music apart from the original situation.”

== Reception ==
The Allmusic review states "all of the selections have their memorable moments and it is good to hear this classic unit playing such fresh material".

== Track listing ==
All compositions by John Lewis

1. "Skating in Central Park" - 6:07
2. "No Happiness for Slater" - 5:18
3. "A Social Call" - 4:45
4. "Cue No. 9" - 5:00
5. "A Cold Wind Is Blowing" - 7:29
6. "Odds Against Tomorrow" - 3:33

== Personnel ==
- Milt Jackson - vibraphone
- John Lewis - piano
- Percy Heath - bass
- Connie Kay - drums

== See also ==
- John Lewis, Odds Against Tomorrow (Original Music From The Motion Picture Soundtrack) (1959)
