= Space (Modern Jazz Quartet album) =

Studio album by Modern Jazz Quartet
- Released: October 4, 1969
- Recorded: 1969
- Studio: Trident Studios, London
- Genre: Jazz
- Length: 33:24
- Label: Apple; SAPCOR 10 (UK) / STAO 3360 (US)
- Producer: John Lewis

Modern Jazz Quartet chronology
Under the Jasmin Tree (1968)	Space (1969)	Plastic Dreams (1971)

Professional ratings
Review scores
Source	Rating
Allmusic	3/5 stars
The Penguin Guide to Jazz Recordings	3/4 stars
Tom Hull	B

Space is an album by American jazz group the Modern Jazz Quartet featuring performances recorded in 1969 and released on the Apple label.

== Reception ==
The Allmusic review by Scott Yanow stated: "Overall this is an average but worthy outing from a group whose excellence could always be taken for granted".

== Track listing ==
Side one

1. "Visitor from Venus" (John Lewis) – 5:40
2. "Visitor from Mars" (John Lewis) – 7:18
3. "Here's That Rainy Day" (Jimmy Van Heusen, Johnny Burke) – 4:20

Side two

4. "Dilemma" (Miljenko Prohaska) – 5:48
5. "Adagio from Concierto de Aranjuez" (Joaquín Rodrigo) – 10:18

== Personnel ==
- Milt Jackson - vibraphone
- John Lewis - piano
- Percy Heath - double bass
- Connie Kay - drums, percussion
