= European Concert =

Jazz album by the Modern Jazz Quartet

Live album by Modern Jazz Quartet
- Released: 1960
- Recorded: April 11–13, 1960
- Venues: Stockholm and Gothenburg, Sweden
- Genre: Jazz
- Length: 76:17
- Labels: Atlantic SD 2-603 (orig. as Atlantic 1385 and 1386)
- Producer: Nesuhi Ertegun

Modern Jazz Quartet chronology
Pyramid (1960)	European Concert (1960)	The Modern Jazz Quartet & Orchestra (1961)

Milt Jackson chronology
Pyramid (1960)	European Concert (1960)	Soul Meeting (1961)

Professional ratings
Review scores
Source	Rating
Allmusic	5/5 stars
The Rolling Stone Jazz Record Guide	5/5 stars

European Concert is a live album by American jazz group the Modern Jazz Quartet featuring performances recorded in Sweden in April 1960 and originally released in two consecutive volumes on the Atlantic label.

== Reception ==
The AllMusic review stated, "Long considered one of, if not the classic album from the Modern Jazz Quartet, European Concert defines them simultaneously as a recording entity as well as a working band".

== Track listing ==
All compositions by John Lewis except as indicated

1. "Django" – 5:32
2. "Bluesology" (Milt Jackson) – 4:39
3. "I Should Care" (Sammy Cahn, Axel Stordahl, Paul Weston) – 5:33
4. "La Ronde" – 3:07
5. "I Remember Clifford" (Benny Golson, Jon Hendricks) – 5:15
6. "Festival Sketch" – 4:40
7. "Vendome" – 2:45
8. "Odds Against Tomorrow" – 6:57
9. "Pyramid (Blues for Junior)" (Ray Brown) – 8:45
10. "It Don't Mean a Thing (If It Ain't Got That Swing)" (Duke Ellington, Irving Mills) – 5:36
11. "Skating in Central Park" – 6:10
12. "The Cylinder" (Jackson) – 6:28
13. "'Round Midnight" (Thelonious Monk) – 3:51
14. "Bags' Groove" (Jackson) – 5:13
15. "I'll Remember April" (Gene de Paul, Patricia Johnston, Don Raye) – 4:54

Tracks 5, 6, 9, 12, 14 and 15 recorded in Stockholm, April 11; tracks 1 – 4, 8, 11 recorded in Gothenburg, April 12; tracks 7, 10, 13 recorded in Stockholm, April 13.

== Personnel ==
- Milt Jackson – vibraphone
- John Lewis – piano
- Percy Heath – bass
- Connie Kay – drums
