= The Comedy (album) =

Studio album by Modern Jazz Quartet
- Released: 1962
- Recorded: October 20, 1960 and January 22–24, 1962; New York City
- Genre: Jazz
- Length: 34:35
- Label: Atlantic 1390
- Producer: Nesuhi Ertegun

Modern Jazz Quartet chronology
| The Modern Jazz Quartet & Orchestra (1961) | The Comedy (1962) | Lonely Woman (1962) |

Milt Jackson chronology
| Bags Meets Wes! (1962) | The Comedy (1962) | Lonely Woman (1962) |

Professional ratings
Review scores
| Source | Rating |
|---|---|
| Allmusic | 2/5 stars |

The Comedy is an album by American jazz group the Modern Jazz Quartet featuring performances recorded in 1960 and 1962 and released on the Atlantic label.

== Background ==
The tracks, which form a suite of seven movements by the Modern Jazz Quartet's pianist and musical director John Lewis, were inspired by characters from Commedia dell'arte, and followed on from his first depiction of the theatrical form on the title track of the 1956 album Fontessa. Lewis later recalled: "The main thing about the commedia dell'arte was that the things they did were principally improvised until Carlo Goldoni started to write them down. It reminded me very much of the way jazz developed from small groups of musicians traveling place to place and having to make sure they satisfied the local audience."

== Reception ==
In his book Visions of Jazz, Gary Giddins summarized the reception of the album as follows: The critical response ranged from 'frequently ponderous', with Jackson asked to execute 'some fairly mechanical ideas' (Martin Williams), to 'the Modern Jazz Quartet's greatest single achievement, the peak to which all their preceding work together leads' with 'some of the most astonishing passages' Jackson ever recorded (Max Harrison).

The Allmusic review stated "This is the type of album that led many bop purists to criticize the Modern Jazz Quartet (and John Lewis in particular) for being overly influenced by Western classical music".

== Track listing ==
All compositions by John Lewis

1. "Spanish Steps" – 5:35
2. "Columbine" – 4:10
3. "Pulcinella" – 4:20
4. "Pierrot" – 3:23
5. "La Cantatrice" – 4:58
6. "Harlequin" – 6:58
7. "Piazza Navona" – 5:11

== Personnel ==
- Milt Jackson – vibraphone
- John Lewis – piano
- Percy Heath – bass
- Connie Kay – drums
- Diahann Carroll – vocals (track 5)
