= Connie Kay =

American drummer (1927–1994)

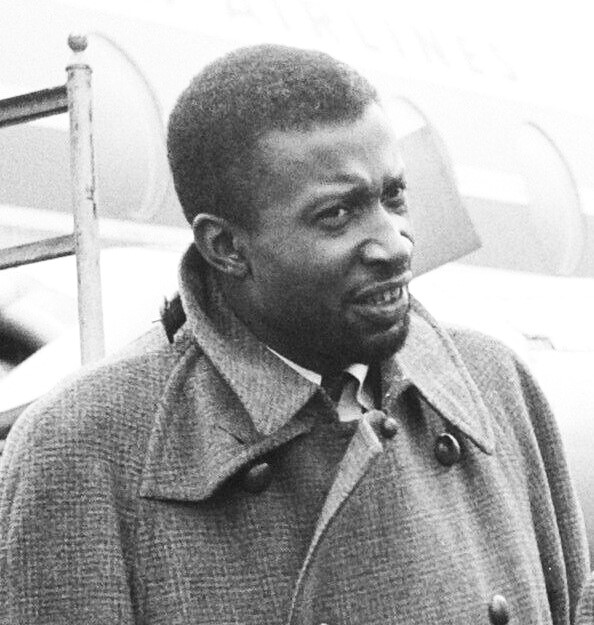
- Kay in 1961

Background information
- Born: Conrad Henry Kirnon; April 27, 1927; Tuckahoe, New York, U.S.
- Died: November 30, 1994 (aged 67) New York City, U.S.
- Genres: Jazz
- Occupation: Musician
- Instrument: Drums
- Years active: 1940s–1990s
- Formerly of: The Modern Jazz Quartet

Conrad Henry Kirnon (April 27, 1927 – November 30, 1994) known professionally as Connie Kay, was an American jazz and R&B drummer, who was a member of the Modern Jazz Quartet.

== Biography ==
Self-taught on drums, Kay began performing in Los Angeles in the mid-1940s. His drumming is recorded in The Hunt, the recording of a famous Los Angeles jam session featuring the dueling tenors of Dexter Gordon and Wardell Gray on July 6, 1947. He recorded with Lester Young's quintet from 1949 to 1955 and with Stan Getz, Coleman Hawkins, Charlie Parker, and Miles Davis.

Kay did R&B sessions for Atlantic Records in the early to mid-1950s, and he was featured on hit records such as "Shake, Rattle and Roll" by Big Joe Turner and Ruth Brown's "(Mama) He Treats Your Daughter Mean".

Kay joined the Modern Jazz Quartet in 1955, replacing original drummer Kenny Clarke. He remained through the group's dissolution in 1974 and occasional reunions into the 1990s. In addition to his MJQ compatriots, he had an enduring partnership with cool jazz altoist Paul Desmond through the first half of the 1960s. He played drums on several of Irish singer-songwriter Van Morrison's albums: Astral Weeks, one song on Saint Dominic's Preview, and four songs on Tupelo Honey.

Kay was known for incorporating percussion instruments alongside his drum kit, such as timpani, small cymbals, triangle, bell tree, and darbukas, the latter referred to as "exotic-looking" drums in a 2006 article.

In 1989, Kay received an honorary doctorate of music from Berklee College of Music.

Kay had a stroke in 1992, but recovered enough to resume performing. He died of cardiac arrest in Manhattan in 1994 at the age of 67. He also played with Benny Goodman's Orchestra at the Carnegie Hall 40th Anniversary Concert on January 17, 1978. Kay never recorded as a session leader.

== Discography ==
=== With the Modern Jazz Quartet ===
- The Modern Jazz Quartet at the Music Inn Volume 1 (3D, 1956)
- One Never Knows (Atlantic, 1957)
- Patterns (United Artists, 1960)
- The Modern Jazz Quartet Plays for Lovers (Prestige, 1965)
- Concorde (Prestige, 1955)
- Fontessa (Atlantic, 1956) included "Versailles"
- The Modern Jazz Quartet Plays No Sun in Venice (Atlantic, 1957)
- The Modern Jazz Quartet (Atlantic, 1957)
- The Modern Jazz Quartet and the Oscar Peterson Trio at the Opera House (Verve, 1957)
- Lost Tapes: Germany 1956–1958 (Jazzhaus, 1956–1958 [2013])
- The Modern Jazz Quartet at Music Inn Volume 2 (Atlantic, 1959)
- Music from Odds Against Tomorrow (United Artists, 1959)
- Pyramid (Atlantic, 1960)
- European Concert (Atlantic, 1960 [1962])
- Dedicated to Connie (Atlantic, 1960 [1995])
- The Modern Jazz Quartet & Orchestra (Atlantic, 1960)
- Third Stream Music (Atlantic, 1960)
- The Comedy (Atlantic, 1962)
- Lonely Woman (Atlantic, 1962)
- A Quartet is a Quartet is a Quartet (Atlantic, 1963)
- Collaboration (Atlantic, 1964) – with Laurindo Almeida
- The Modern Jazz Quartet Plays George Gershwin's Porgy and Bess (Atlantic, 1965)
- Jazz Dialogue (Atlantic, 1965) with the All-Star Jazz Band
- Concert in Japan '66 (Atlantic [Japan], 1966)
- Blues at Carnegie Hall (Atlantic, 1966)
- Place Vendôme (Philips, 1966) – with The Swingle Singers
- Under the Jasmin Tree (Apple, 1968)
- Space (Apple, 1969)
- Plastic Dreams (Atlantic, 1971)
- The Only Recorded Performance of Paul Desmond With The Modern Jazz Quartet (Finesse/Columbia, 1971 [1981]) – with Paul Desmond
- The Legendary Profile (Atlantic, 1972)
- In Memoriam (Little David, 1973)
- Blues on Bach (Atlantic, 1973)
- The Last Concert (Atlantic, 1974)
- Reunion at Budokan 1981 (Pablo, 1981)
- Together Again: Live at the Montreux Jazz Festival '82 (Pablo, 1982)
- Echoes (Pablo, 1984)
- Topsy: This One's for Basie (Pablo, 1985)
- Three Windows (Atlantic, 1987)
- For Ellington (East West, 1988)
- Rose of the Rio Grande (Capitol, 1989)
- MJQ & Friends: A 40th Anniversary Celebration (Atlantic, 1993)
- A Night at the Opera (Jazz Anthology, 1994)
- Live at the Theatre Royal, Bath (BBC, 2001)

=== As sideman ===
With Cannonball Adderley

- Know What I Mean (Riverside, 1961)

With Chet Baker

- Chet (Riverside, 1959)
- Baker's Holiday (Limelight, 1965)

With Ruth Brown

- Ruth Brown (Atlantic, 1957)
- Miss Rhythm (Atlantic, 1959)

With Miles Davis

- Miles Davis at Newport 1955–1975: The Bootleg Series Vol. 4 (Columbia Legacy, 2015)

With Paul Desmond

- First Place Again (Warner Bros., 1959)
- Desmond Blue (RCA Victor, 1961)
- Two of a Mind (RCA Victor, 1962) with Gerry Mulligan
- Take Ten (RCA Victor, 1963)
- Bossa Antigua (RCA Victor, 1964)
- Glad To Be Unhappy (RCA Victor, 1964)
- Easy Living (RCA Victor, 1963–65 [1966])
- Pure Desmond (CTI, 1975)

With Bill Evans & Bob Brookmeyer

- The Ivory Hunters (United Artists, 1959)

With Dexter Gordon and Wardell Gray

- The Hunt (Savoy, 1947 [1977])

With Coleman Hawkins

- Disorder at the Border (Spotlite, 1952 [1973])

With Jimmy Heath

- Swamp Seed (Riverside, 1963)

With Scott Hamilton

- The Grand Appearance (Progressive, 1979)

With Milt Jackson

- Milt Jackson Quartet (Prestige, 1955)
- Plenty, Plenty Soul (Atlantic, 1957)
- Bean Bags with Coleman Hawkins (Atlantic, 1958)
- Bags' Opus (United Artists, 1958)
- The Ballad Artistry of Milt Jackson (Atlantic, 1959)
- Bags & Trane (Atlantic, 1959)
- Vibrations (Atlantic, 1960–61)
- Big Bags (Riverside, 1962)
- Invitation (Riverside, 1962)
- Statements (Impulse!, 1962)
- For Someone I Love (Riverside, 1963)
- Jazz 'n' Samba (Impulse!, 1964)
- In a New Setting (Limelight, 1964)
- I/We Had a Ball (Limelight, 1965) – 1 track

With John Lewis

- The Modern Jazz Society Presents a Concert of Contemporary Music (Norgran, 1955)
- Afternoon in Paris (Atlantic, 1957) with Sacha Distel
- The John Lewis Piano (Atlantic, 1957)
- The Golden Striker (Atlantic, 1960)
- The Wonderful World of Jazz (Atlantic, 1960)
- Essence (Atlantic, 1962)

With Jay McShann

- The Big Apple Bash (Atlantic, 1979)

With James Moody

- The Blues and Other Colors (Milestone, 1969)

With Van Morrison

- Astral Weeks (Warner Bros., 1968)
- Tupelo Honey (Warner Bros., 1971)
- Saint Dominic's Preview (Warner Bros., 1972)

With Joe Newman

- The Happy Cats (Coral, 1957)

With Sonny Rollins

- Sonny Rollins at Music Inn (MetroJazz, 1958)

With Michel Sardaby

- Night Cap (Sound Hills, 1970)

With Lucky Thompson

- Lucky Strikes (Prestige, 1964)

With Bobby Timmons

- Born to Be Blue! (Riverside, 1963)

With Randy Weston

- Piano á la Mode (Jubilee, 1957)
