= Collaboration (Modern Jazz Quartet and Laurindo Almeida album) =

Live album by Modern Jazz Quartet with Laurindo Almeida
- Released: 1964
- Recorded: July 21, 1964
- Venue: RCA Webster Hall, New York City
- Genre: Jazz
- Length: 38:00
- Label: Atlantic 1429
- Producer: Nesuhi Ertegun

Modern Jazz Quartet chronology
The Sheriff (1964)	Collaboration (1964)	Plays George Gershwin's Porgy and Bess (1965)

Milt Jackson chronology
Much in Common (1964)	Collaboration (1964)	Jazz 'n' Samba (1964)

Professional ratings
Review scores
Source	Rating
Allmusic	4.5/5 stars
The Rolling Stone Jazz Record Guide	4/5 stars

Collaboration is an album by American jazz group the Modern Jazz Quartet with Brazilian guitarist Laurindo Almeida featuring performances recorded at Webster Hall in 1964 and released on the Atlantic label.

== Reception ==
The Allmusic review stated "the music is very memorable".

== Track listing ==
All compositions by John Lewis except as indicated

1. "Silver" - 3:40
2. "Trieste" - 5:22
3. "Valeria" - 5:47
4. "Fugue in A Minor" (Johann Sebastian Bach) (BWV 947)- 3:46
5. "One Note Samba" (Antonio Carlos Jobim, Newton Mendonça) - 5:06
6. "Foi A Saudade" (Djalma Ferreira) - 2:34
7. "Concierto de Aranjuez" (Joaquín Rodrigo) - 11:45

== Personnel ==
- Milt Jackson – vibraphone
- John Lewis – piano
- Percy Heath – bass
- Connie Kay – drums
- Laurindo Almeida – guitar
