= Modern Jazz Quartet =

American jazz ensemble

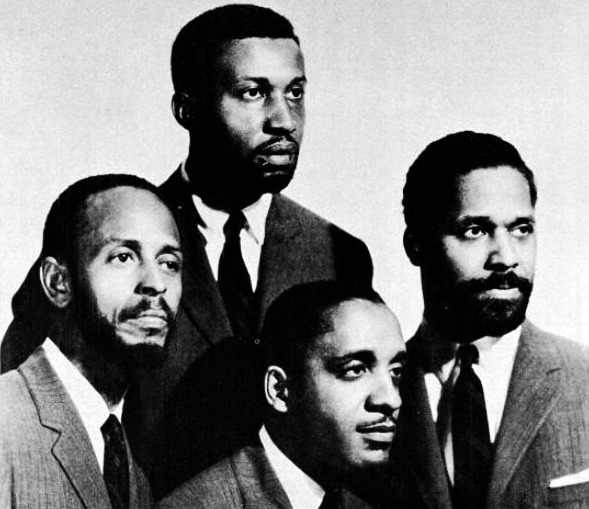
- Modern Jazz Quartet in 1964; Left to right: Percy Heath, Connie Kay, Milt Jackson, John Lewis

Background information
- Also known as: The Quartet, The MJQ
- Origin: New York City, U.S.
- Genres: Jazz; third stream; cool jazz
- Years active: 1952–1974; 1981–1997
- Labels: Prestige (UK Esquire), Atlantic (UK London), Apple, Douglas
- Past members: Kenny Clarke; Milt Jackson; John Lewis; Percy Heath; Connie Kay; Mickey Roker; Albert Heath

The Modern Jazz Quartet (MJQ) was a jazz ensemble established in 1952 that blended classical music, cool jazz, blues and bebop. The quartet consisted of John Lewis (piano), Milt Jackson (vibraphone), Percy Heath (double bass), and various drummers, most notably Kenny Clarke (from 1952 to 1955) and Connie Kay (from 1955 to 1994).

The group grew out of the rhythm section of Dizzy Gillespie's big band from 1946 to 1948, which consisted of Lewis, Jackson, and Clarke along with bassist Ray Brown. They recorded as the Milt Jackson Quartet in 1951 and Brown left the group, being replaced on bass by Heath. During the early-to-mid-1950s they became the Modern Jazz Quartet, Lewis became the group's musical director, and they made several recordings with Prestige Records, including the original versions of their two best-known compositions, Lewis's "Django" and Jackson's "Bags' Groove". Clarke left the group in 1955 and was replaced as drummer by Kay, and in 1956 they moved to Atlantic Records and made their first tour to Europe.

Under Lewis's direction, they carved their own niche by specializing in elegant, restrained music that used sophisticated counterpoint inspired by Baroque music, yet nonetheless retained a strong blues feel. Noted for their elegant presentation, they were one of the first small jazz combos to perform in concert halls rather than nightclubs. They were initially active into the 1970s until Jackson quit in 1974 due to frustration with their finances and touring schedule, but re-formed in 1981. They made their last released recordings in 1992 and 1993, with Mickey Roker sometimes substituting for Kay due to Kay's health issues. After Kay's death in 1994, the group operated on a semi-active basis, with Percy Heath's brother Albert Heath on drums until the group disbanded permanently in 1997.

== History ==
=== Background, formation, departure of Kenny Clarke, and Prestige recordings (1946–1955) ===
Two of the four founding members of the Modern Jazz Quartet, pianist John Lewis and drummer Kenny Clarke, met and first performed together in 1944 while stationed with the US army in France during World War II. In 1946, they reconnected in New York, where Clarke, who had joined his friend Dizzy Gillespie's big band, introduced Gillespie to Lewis, who went on to replace Thelonious Monk as the band's pianist. The band's rhythm section now consisted of Lewis (piano), Milt Jackson (vibraphone), Ray Brown (bass), and Clarke (drums). On Gillespie's encouragement, they began to perform improvised renditions of jazz standards as a standalone unit between sets of the big band's music, as an entr'acte, a practice that had been accepted in jazz since Benny Goodman introduced his trio in 1935. Jackson later recalled: "From the first time we performed in that band as a quartet, we became prominent and a part of the band. We would play fifteen to twenty minutes, two or three tunes, and everybody loved it, including Dizzy and the band." Upon the dissolution of Gillespie's band, the rhythm section considered continuing as a quartet under Jackson's name, but they went in their own directions for the next three years. On August 18, 1951, they made a recording as the Milt Jackson Quartet for Gillespie's record label, Dee Gee Records. Brown then left the group to concentrate on working with his wife, singer Ella Fitzgerald, and was replaced as bassist by Percy Heath, who had also performed with Gillespie. The quartet was incorporated on January 14, 1952, as the Modern Jazz Society, Inc., of which the Modern Jazz Quartet became the working entity. Three or four names were considered, including the New Jazz Quartet, before the group decided to use the name Modern Jazz Quartet. In a 1992 interview, Lewis said of the name: "It was an arbitrary name, the quickest name we could get cleared for a corporation in New York state. It had nothing to do with a description of the music." Heath later recalled a conversation between the group members that occurred in Jackson's Cadillac on the way home from a nightclub date that led up to the creation of the Modern Jazz Quartet:

John had this idea to write some different music for the instruments that were in the quartet, and wrote "Vendome" and a few other very orchestrated pieces. He wasn't interested in writing for Milt Jackson's quartet, so we became a partnership, a corporation—the Modern Jazz Quartet was the performing entity. John's vision for the group was to change the music from just a jam session, or rhythm section and soloist idea, to something more. We were all equal members, and the dress, the wearing of tuxedos, and trying to perform in concert rather than always in nightclubs, was part of what he envisioned to change the whole attitude about the music.

In April 1952 they recorded for Hi-Lo Records as the Milt Jackson Quartet and also made a record for Blue Note Records with Lou Donaldson on saxophone as the Milt Jackson Quintet, later released on Wizard of the Vibes; the latter record contained the first recording of "Bags' Groove", which would become a signature song of the Modern Jazz Quartet. In November of that year they accompanied Charlie Parker in a live recording at Birdland. For Prestige Records, they made their first recordings as the Modern Jazz Quartet on December 22, 1952 which, on Prestige CEO Bob Weinstock's insistence, were released under the group name Milt Jackson and the Modern Jazz Quartet. These recordings contained the original version of Lewis's composition "Vendome", the Quartet's first experiment with combining jazz and fugal counterpoint. Between 1953 and early 1955 the group recorded the tracks that were eventually released on the album Django (1956), including their first recording of Lewis's composition "Django", another signature piece for the Quartet. In 1953 they also accompanied Ben Webster and Sonny Rollins on live recordings, the former being released in 2001 as 1953: An Exceptional Encounter. In October 1953, the Quartet began its first major booking at Birdland, which was followed by appearances in Boston, San Francisco, Los Angeles, Philadelphia, and Carnegie Hall. Reviewing their appearance at Birdland, Nat Hentoff wrote: "If the success of the Modern Jazz Quartet depended only on the support of jazz musicians, this could be the most in-demand unit in the country." Heath recalled:

We had a hard time getting people to quiet down and listen. At that time in nightclubs, people were talking about hanging out. In order to break that down, instead of trying to play over the conversation, we'd use reverse psychology and play softer. Suddenly, they knew we were up there and realized the conversation was louder than the music. Of course, if it got too loud, we'd come off – just stop playing and walk off. It didn't take long for them to realize they were wasting their time because we weren't going to entertain them in that sense. We didn't have funny acts, we didn't have any costumes. We were conservatively dressed, we played conservative music, and if you didn't listen you didn't get it. We were four instruments going along horizontally, contrapuntally. There was no backup and soloist, the concept was changing.

In January 1955, they returned to Birdland, and on the last night of that engagement, Clarke announced that he was quitting the band. He later said that he did so because "I wouldn't be able to play the drums my way again after four or five years of playing eighteenth-century drawing-room jazz". Lewis recalled "He was trying to find himself. There was a change in the music, but it was early when Kenny left so it was easy to handle and adjust to. If we had to make the change later, it would have been a disaster. We had to give up a lot of pieces we played when Kenny left." Heath commented "It had to change, because there is no other Kenny Clarke. Kenny didn't want to have such orchestrated music because he was an innovator and didn't want his part dictated." Jackson said "The three years Kenny was in the group was an experimental stage. We were still looking for a direction." Monte Kay, who had by then become the group's manager, suggested that Clarke be replaced by Connie Kay (no relation), who joined the group the day after Clarke had left. The group members had come to have various responsibilities besides playing their instruments: Lewis was the musical director, Jackson handled public relations, Heath managed the finances, and Kay organized the accommodation and transportation. On July 2, 1955, the Modern Jazz Quartet recorded their last album with Prestige Records, Concorde; its title track was Lewis's second major fugue-influenced piece for the group.

=== Move to Atlantic Records and international success (1956–1974) ===
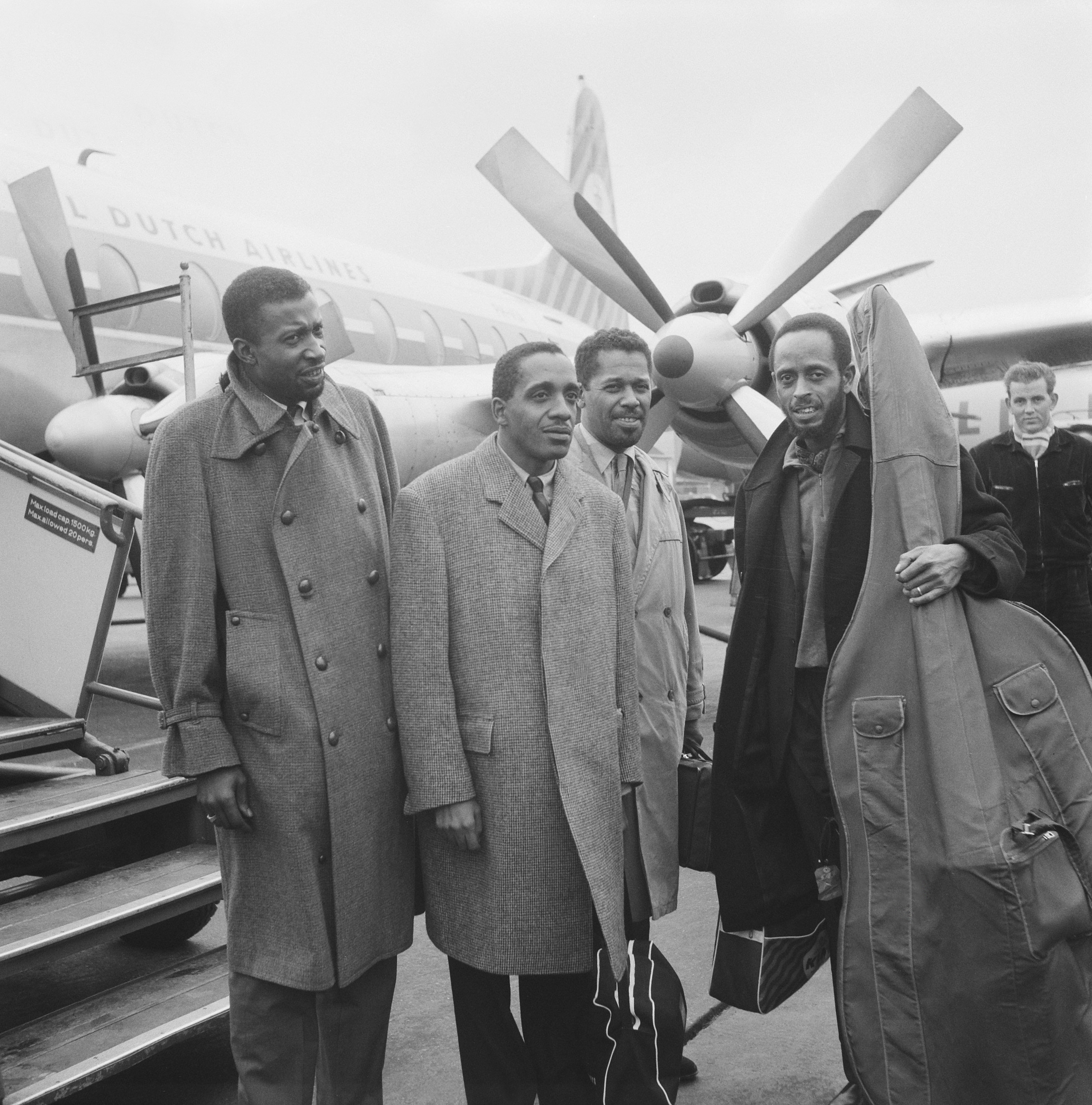
Modern Jazz Quartet at Schiphol Airport (1961)

In 1956, the Modern Jazz Quartet moved to Atlantic Records, which was switching from singles to LPs and began focusing on jazz under the guidance of Nesuhi Ertegun, who signed the group to the company and worked with them as a producer. In that year, they recorded the album Fontessa and had their first formal collaboration with an invited guest, clarinetist Jimmy Giuffre, recorded as The Modern Jazz Quartet at Music Inn. In October of that year the Quartet took their first trip to Europe, where they recorded for South German Radio (SDR), performed on a month-long Birdland All-Star tour with Bud Powell, Miles Davis, and Lester Young, and had a two-week residency at Club Saint-Germain in Paris. The next year they came back to Europe on their own, performing 88 concerts in four months in Germany, France, and the British Isles, receiving rave reviews. In 1957, they also recorded a self-titled studio album, the live album The Modern Jazz Quartet and the Oscar Peterson Trio at the Opera House, and Lewis's first film soundtrack, for No Sun in Venice. The group recorded The Modern Jazz Quartet at Music Inn Volume 2 with Sonny Rollins in 1958 and 1959 saw Lewis's creation of the soundtrack for the film Odds Against Tomorrow, originally recorded with an orchestra and released in an arrangement for the Quartet as Music from Odds Against Tomorrow (1960). In 1960, they released Pyramid and European Concert, and contributed to the third stream movement with Third Stream Music (with Jimmy Giuffre 3) and The Modern Jazz Quartet & Orchestra. In 1962 they released The Comedy, containing a suite by Lewis inspired by characters from Commedia dell'arte, and Lonely Woman, whose title track was one of the first recorded covers of a composition by free jazz pioneer Ornette Coleman. They followed up with The Sheriff and Collaboration with guitarist Laurindo Almeida (1964), along with The Modern Jazz Quartet Plays George Gershwin's Porgy and Bess and Jazz Dialogue with the All Star Jazz Band (1965). They released a collaboration with the Swingle Singers, Place Vendôme (1966), and three live albums, Concert in Japan '66 (in Japan only), Blues at Carnegie Hall (1966), and Live at the Lighthouse (1967).

They then moved from Atlantic to Apple Records, for which they released Under the Jasmin Tree (1968) and Space (1969). Lewis, who produced these albums, recalled: "Monte Kay was a friend of the president of the Beatles' company, and he felt we weren't getting the attention we should have, so we went there and had two good records." Returning to Atlantic, they released Plastic Dreams (1971) and The Legendary Profile (1972). In 1973 they recorded the last two studio albums before their hiatus, In Memoriam (with an orchestra conducted by Maurice Peress) and Blues on Bach, both of which were released the next year). During this period, they performed annual Christmas concerts at the New York City Town Hall; a recording of performances from 1971 with Paul Desmond on saxophone was released in 1981.

=== Hiatus, reunion, and final years (1974–1997) ===
It was nothing personal. In '74, when I decided to leave, the biggest reason was I was not just disappointed but bitterly disappointed about the financial outcome of what I felt was a major contribution by the group to music. To see other people making so much more money than we would ever see, that was a disappointment to me. I thought this group would make as much money as any group in jazz, or in music for that matter, because of what we stood for in the musical profession.

— Jackson on quitting the group

In July 1974, Jackson quit the group, later citing frustration with their finances as his primary reason. He was also unhappy with the group's touring schedule, which by then had become year-round rather than the previous arrangement in which they had vacations during the northern hemisphere summer. Jackson had previously used the downtime to play and record music that was not in the style of the Modern Jazz Quartet, but felt saddled in the group after they also began playing at summer jazz festivals around 1970. The jazz magazine DownBeat compared their breakup to "the abrupt disintegration of Mt. Rushmore". In November 1974 they performed a farewell concert at Avery Fisher Hall, later released as a series of two albums and then as a complete package, The Complete Last Concert (1988). They had occasional reunion concerts, never going more than eighteen months without playing together, before reuniting in 1981 for a tour of Japan, recorded as Reunion at Budokan 1981 for Pablo Records. They recorded three more albums for Pablo, Together Again: Live at the Montreux Jazz Festival '82 (1982), Echoes (1984), and Topsy: This One's for Basie (1985), before returning to Atlantic, recording Three Windows (1987, with the New York Chamber Symphony) and For Ellington (1988).

Kay had a stroke in 1992 and during his recovery was replaced by drummer Mickey Roker, who performed on some tracks on the group's last released recording, MJQ & Friends: A 40th Anniversary Celebration (recorded 1992–1993, released 1994). Kay died in November 1994, after which the group operated on a semi-active basis; the 1995 album Dedicated to Connie, a recording of a 1960 concert in Slovenia, was released in his memory. In February 1995, Albert Heath, Percy Heath's brother, became the quartet's percussionist. Percy Heath had become tired of touring by 1997 and the group permanently disbanded in that year after a final recording date. In October 1999, Jackson died, followed by Lewis in March 2001 and Heath in April 2005.

== Style and public image ==
The Modern Jazz Quartet played in a cool jazz style that combined bebop and the blues with classical elements. There was a marked contrast in styles between Jackson's rhythmically complex blues-based solos and Lewis's restrained manner of playing and classically influenced pieces.

One of the first small jazz combos to perform in concert halls rather than nightclubs, the group was noted for habitually wearing formal attire at concerts, inspired by the bands of Duke Ellington and Jimmie Lunceford. In his book Visions of Jazz, Gary Giddins summed up their legacy with an explanation of the jazz scene in 1992: "... Young bands customarily performed in concert and at festivals, often in tailored suits. Composition was as widely vaunted for small ensembles as improvisation, and flawless intonation was considered vital. Such traditional jazz devices as polyphony, riffs, breaks, boogie bass, mutes, and fugal counterpoint, as well as a repertory that ranges over the entire history of the music, were everywhere apparent. You could say that the Modern Jazz quartet now resided in a world at least partially of its own making."

== Honors and legacy ==
The Modern Jazz Quartet earned a variety of honors, including the first NAACP award for cultural contributions in the field of music in 1957, top billing on numerous jazz magazine polls, and honorary doctorates from Berklee College. The Modern Folk Quartet, which was most active in the 1960s, took their name as a conscious parallel with the Modern Jazz Quartet.

== Discography ==
=== As primary artist ===
Recording date	Title	Label	Year released	Notes
1952-04-07	Wizard of the Vibes (aka Milt Jackson (1956)[12"])	Blue Note	1952	[10"] the one of three recording sessions has identical personnel to the Modern Jazz Quartet of the time plus Lou Donaldson in this compilation album.
1953-02-21, -23	1953: An Exceptional Encounter	The Jazz Factory	2001	Live with Ben Webster. Released after the breakup.
1952-12-11, 1954-06-16	The Modern Jazz Quartet and Milt Jackson Quintet	Prestige	1953; 1954	These two [10"] albums were combined in a compilation album M J Q (1956)
1953-06-25, 1954-12-23, 1955-01-09	Django	Prestige	1956	
1955-07-02	Concorde	Prestige	1955	
1956-01-22, 1956-02-14	Fontessa	Atlantic	1956	
1956-08-26, 1959-09-23	Third Stream Music	Atlantic	1960	with guests the Jimmy Giuffre 3 (with Jim Hall and Ralph Pena) and the Beaux Arts String Quartet
1956-08-28	The Modern Jazz Quartet at Music Inn	Atlantic	1956	Live with guest Jimmy Giuffre
1956-10-26, 1956-11-09, 1957-11-10, 1958-10	Lost Tapes: Germany 1956–1958	Jazzhaus	2013	with the Harold Banter Ensemble (1 track) and the Orchester Kurt Edelhagen (2 tracks)
1957-04-05	The Modern Jazz Quartet	Atlantic	1957	
1957-04-04, 1957-08-28	The Modern Jazz Quartet Plays No Sun in Venice	Atlantic	1958	Film score of No Sun in Venice (1957)
1957-10-19	The Modern Jazz Quartet and the Oscar Peterson Trio at the Opera House	Verve	1957	Live with the Oscar Peterson Trio
1958-08-03, -31	The Modern Jazz Quartet at Music Inn Volume 2	Atlantic	1959	Live with guest Sonny Rollins
1959-08-22, -25, 1959-12-21, 1960-01-15	Pyramid	Atlantic	1960	
1959-10-09, -10	Music from Odds Against Tomorrow (also released as Patterns (1960))	United Artists	1959	Film score of Odds Against Tomorrow (1959)
1960-04-11 – -13	European Concert	Atlantic	1960	[2LP] Live
1960-05-27	Dedicated to Connie	Atlantic	1995	[2CD] Live recorded in Ljubljana. Also released as Modern Jazz Quartet in Concert (Jazz Life, 1990)[2CD]
1960-06-03, -04	The Modern Jazz Quartet & Orchestra	Atlantic	1961	
1960-10-20, 1962-01-22, -23, -24	The Comedy	Atlantic	1962	
1962-01-24, -25, -29, 1962-02-02	Lonely Woman	Atlantic	1962	
1963-09-20 – -22	In A Crowd (also released as Live At Monterey)	Douglas	1996	Live at the Monterey Jazz Festival. Released after the breakup.
1963-05-16, -17, 1963-12-20	The Sheriff	Atlantic	1964	
1964-07-21	Collaboration	Atlantic	1964	Live with Laurindo Almeida
1964-07-23, -26, 1965-04-26	The Modern Jazz Quartet Plays George Gershwin's Porgy and Bess	Atlantic	1965	
1965-05-27, 1965-06-25	Jazz Dialogue	Atlantic	1965	with The All Star Jazz Band
1966-03-14	Concert in Japan '66	Atlantic	1976	[2LP] Live at Kōsei Nenkin Kaikan, Tokyo. Japan only.
1966-04-27	Blues at Carnegie Hall	Atlantic, Philips	1966	Live at Carnegie Hall, NYC
1967-03-16, -17	Live at the Lighthouse	Atlantic	1967	Live at Lighthouse Café, CA
1967-12-12	Under the Jasmin Tree	Apple	1968	
1969	Space	Apple	1969	
1971-05-24	Plastic Dreams	Atlantic	1971	
1972-06-01	The Legendary Profile	Atlantic	1972	
1973-11-05, -06	In Memoriam	Little David	1974	
1973-11-26, -27	Blues on Bach	Atlantic	1974	
1974-11-25	The Complete Last Concert	Atlantic	1988	[2CD] Live includes The Last Concert (1975)[2LP] and More from the Last Concert (1981)
1981-10-19, -20	Reunion at Budokan 1981	Atlantic, Pablo	1981	Live at Nippon Budokan
1982-07-25	Together Again: Live at the Montreux Jazz Festival '82	Pablo	1982	Live at the Monterey Jazz Festival
1984-03-06	Echoes	Pablo	1984	
1985-06-03, -04	Topsy: This One's for Basie	Pablo	1985	
1987-03-16 – -20	Three Windows	Atlantic	1987	
1988-02-01 – -03	For Ellington	East West	1988	
1992 summer	A Night at the Opera	Jazz Door	1994	Unofficial. Live at Opera Philadelphia.
1992–06, 1993–04, 1993–07	MJQ & Friends: A 40th Anniversary Celebration	Atlantic	1994	1 live track. 40th Anniversary.

Compilations

- The Quartet (Savoy, 1956) – contains recordings by the Modern Jazz Quartet and the Milt Jackson Quartet
- M J Q (Prestige, 1956) – combined The Modern Jazz Quartet (1953) and Milt Jackson Quintet (1954)
- Plays for Lovers (Prestige, 1960)
- The Modern Jazz Quartet (Prestige, 1972)[2LP]
- The Art of The Modern Jazz Quartet – The Atlantic Years (Atlantic, 1973)[2LP]
- A Proper Introduction to the Modern Jazz Quartet: La Ronde (Past Perfect, 2002)
- The Complete Modern Jazz Quartet Prestige & Pablo Recordings (Prestige/Pablo/Fantasy, 2003)[4CD]
- The Modern Jazz Quartet & Jimmy Giuffre – Complete Recordings (Lone Hill, 2005)
- The MJQ in the Movies (Giant Steps, 2010)
- Under The Jasmin Tree / Space (Apple, 2010) – includes "Yesterday"
- The Complete Atlantic Studio Recordings of The Modern Jazz Quartet 1956–64 (Mosaic, 2011)[7CD]
- Original Album Series – The Modern Jazz Quartet (Warner, 2012)[5CD]

=== As sidemen ===
- Bob Brookmeyer & Bill Evans, The Ivory Hunters (United Artists, 1959) – Rhythm section; Percy Heath & Connie Kay. also released as As Time Goes By.
- Paul Desmond, The Only Recorded Performance of Paul Desmond With The Modern Jazz Quartet (Finesse/Columbia, 1981) – live rec. 1971 at The Town Hall
- Sonny Rollins, Sonny Rollins with the Modern Jazz Quartet (Prestige, 1956) – compilation
- The Swingle Singers, Place Vendôme (Philips, 1966)
- Ben Webster, Rare Live Performance 1962 (Musidisc, 1975) – radio live in 1953. reissued as 1953: An Exceptional Encounter (The Jazz Factory, 2001).

== Filmography ==
- 2005: The Modern Jazz Quartet: 35th Anniversary Tour
- 2007: 40 Years of MJQ
- 2008: Django
