= New York Chamber Symphony =

Chamber orchestra in New York City

The New York Chamber Symphony (NYCS) was an American chamber orchestra based in New York City. It was active from 1977 to 2002.

It was founded in 1977 by its founding music director Gerard Schwarz, and Omus Hirshbein. Its original name was the Y Chamber Symphony, and it was the resident ensemble at the 92nd Street Y, where Hirshbein was director of music programming. The orchestra changed its name to the New York Chamber Symphony in 1986 and in 1996 moved to Lincoln Center's Alice Tully Hall. It also performed, in two seasons, four free concerts in Central Park presented by the Naumburg Orchestral Concerts, (1999–2000). and conducted several tours.

The orchestra's membership included many of New York City's finest classical musicians, a number of whom teach at the Juilliard School, the Peabody Conservatory, Yale University, and the Eastman School of Music.

Guest artists who have performed with the New York Chamber Symphony early in their careers include Itzhak Perlman, Yo-Yo Ma, Nadja Salerno-Sonnenberg, Dawn Upshaw, Emanuel Ax, Gil Shaham, Yefim Bronfman, Joshua Bell, Hélène Grimaud, Horacio Gutiérrez, and Hilary Hahn.

It was also known for its performances of contemporary music, commissioning works from composers such as David Diamond, Bright Sheng, Richard Danielpour, and Aaron Jay Kernis. Each year, it presented and recorded concerts of world premieres by American composers, under the sponsorship of the Master Musicians Collective. In 1993, the symphony won an award from the American Society of Composers, Authors and Publishers (ASCAP) for its commitment to new music programs. In June 2000, the orchestra received a $100,000 challenge grant from the Knight Foundation to begin work on a new music/audience development project designed to accomplish the selection of new music by the orchestra musicians and their audiences.

The orchestra has released more than 20 recordings. It has recorded works by such American composers as Paul Creston, David Diamond, Howard Hanson, and Walter Piston, as part of Delos Records' American Masters Series. It has also recorded for the Angel/EMI, Nonesuch, Pro Arte, and RCA Red Seal labels. The orchestra has received three Grammy Award nominations for its recordings of works by Aaron Copland and Howard Hanson.

In 2000, the symphony was engaged to play for Brazil's 500th-anniversary celebration at Lincoln Center.

In 2002 the New York Chamber Symphony cancelled its upcoming (2002–2003) season after Schwarz announced his decision to resign his post as music director after the 2001–2002 season (the symphony's 25th), in order to focus on his new position as director of the Royal Liverpool Philharmonic Orchestra and his ongoing commitment to the Seattle Symphony. A successor could not be found, nor funding secured to continue the symphony's activities.
