= Milt Jackson =

American jazz vibraphonist (1923–1999)

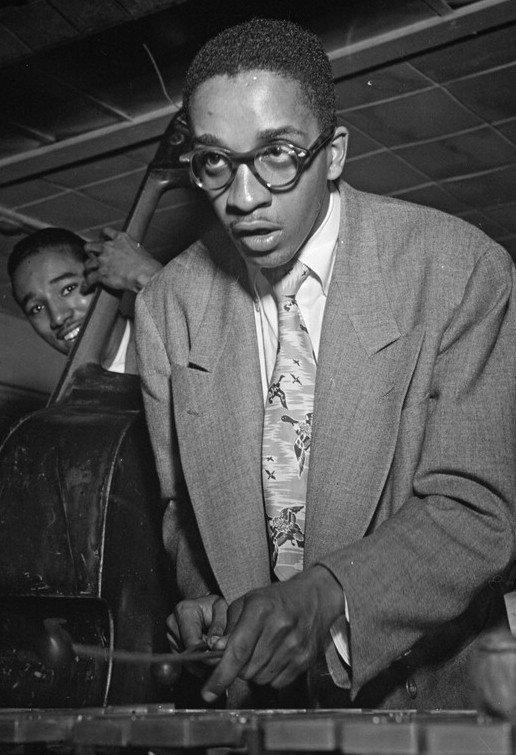
- Jackson with bassist Ray Brown, c. 1947

Background information
- Born: Milton Jackson; January 1, 1923; Detroit, Michigan, U.S.
- Died: October 9, 1999 (aged 76) New York City, U.S.
- Genres: Hard bop; Afro-Cuban jazz; modal jazz; mainstream jazz; post-bop
- Occupations: Musician; soloist; composer; bandleader
- Instruments: Vibraphone; piano
- Years active: 1940s-1999
- Labels: Impulse!; Atlantic; CTI; Prestige; Apple
- Formerly of: The Modern Jazz Quartet

Milton Jackson (January 1, 1923 – October 9, 1999), nicknamed "Bags", was an American jazz vibraphonist. He is especially remembered for his cool swinging solos as a member of the Modern Jazz Quartet and his penchant for collaborating with hard bop and post-bop players. A very expressive player, Jackson was particularly fond of the twelve-bar blues at slow tempos. On occasion, he also sang and played piano.

== Biography ==
Jackson was born on January 1, 1923, in Detroit, Michigan, United States, the son of Manley Jackson and Lillie Beaty Jackson. Like many of his contemporaries, he was surrounded by music from an early age, particularly that of religious meetings: "Everyone wants to know where I got that funky style. Well, it came from church. The music I heard was open, relaxed, impromptu soul music" (quoted in Nat Hentoff's liner notes to Plenty, Plenty Soul). He started on guitar when he was seven, and then on piano at 11.

While attending Miller High School, he played drums, timpani and violin, and also sang in the choir. At 16, he sang professionally in a local touring gospel quartet called the Evangelist Singers. He took up the vibraphone at 16 after hearing Lionel Hampton play the instrument in Benny Goodman's band. Jackson was discovered by Dizzy Gillespie, who hired him for his sextet in 1945, then his larger ensembles. Jackson quickly acquired experience working with the most important figures in jazz of the era, including Woody Herman, Howard McGhee, Thelonious Monk, and Charlie Parker.

In the Gillespie big band, Jackson fell into a pattern that led to the founding of the Modern Jazz Quartet: Gillespie maintained a former swing tradition of a small group within a big band, and his included Jackson, pianist John Lewis, bassist Ray Brown, and drummer Kenny Clarke (considered a pioneer of the ride-cymbal timekeeping that became the signature for bop and most jazz to follow) while the brass and reeds took breaks. When they decided to become a working group in their own right, around 1950, the foursome was known at first as the Milt Jackson Quartet, becoming the Modern Jazz Quartet (MJQ) in 1952. By that time Percy Heath had replaced Ray Brown.

Known at first for featuring Jackson's blues-heavy improvisations almost exclusively, in time the group came to split the difference between these and Lewis's more ambitious musical ideas. Lewis had become the group's musical director by 1955, the year Clarke departed in favour of Connie Kay, boiling the quartet down to a chamber jazz style, that highlighted the lyrical tension between Lewis's mannered, but roomy, compositions, and Jackson's unapologetic swing.

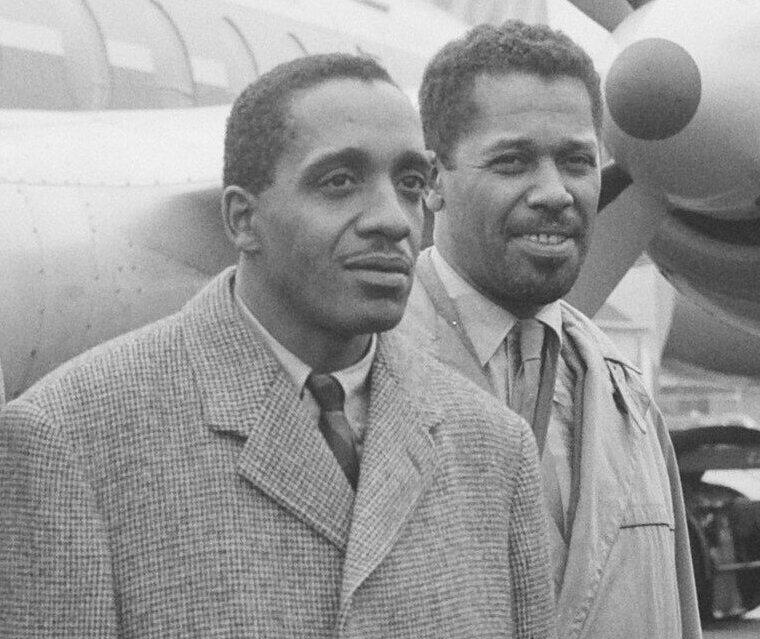
Jackson and John Lewis in Amsterdam

The MJQ had a long independent career of some two decades until disbanding in 1974, when Jackson split with Lewis. The group reformed in 1981, however, and continued until 1993, after which Jackson toured alone, performing in various small combos, although agreeing to periodic MJQ reunions. From the mid-1970s to the mid-1980s, Jackson recorded for Norman Granz's Pablo Records, including Jackson, Johnson, Brown & Company (1983), featuring Jackson with J. J. Johnson on trombone, Ray Brown on bass, backed by Tom Ranier on piano, guitarist John Collins, and drummer Roy McCurdy.

In 1989, Jackson was awarded an Honorary Doctorate of Music from the Berklee College of Music.

His composition "Bags' Groove" is a jazz standard. ("Bags" was a nickname given to him by a bass player in Detroit. "Bags" referred to the bags under his eyes.) He was featured on the NPR radio program Jazz Profiles. Some of his other signature compositions include "The Late, Late Blues" (for his album with Coltrane, Bags & Trane), "Bluesology" (an MJQ staple), and "Bags & Trane".

Jackson died of liver cancer in Manhattan, New York at the age of 76. He was married to Sandra Whittington from 1959 until his death; the couple had a daughter.

== Discography ==
=== As leader/co-leader ===
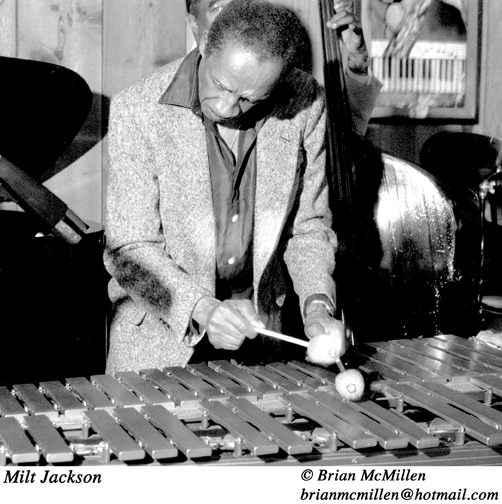
Jackson at Bach Dancing & Dynamite Society, Half Moon Bay, California, 1980s.

Recording date	Title	Label	Year released	Notes
1948-02	Howard McGhee and Milt Jackson	Savoy	1955	with Howard McGhee
1948-07-02, 1951-07-23, 1952-04-07	Wizard of the Vibes also released as Milt Jackson	Blue Note	1952	[10"] with Thelonious Monk
1955-05-20	Milt Jackson Quartet	Prestige	1955	
1955-10-28	Opus de Jazz	Savoy	1956	
1949-01-25, 1956-01-05	Roll 'Em Bags	Savoy	1956	
1949-02-23, 1954-11-01, 1955-02-07, 1956-01-05	Meet Milt Jackson	Savoy	1956	
1956-01-23	The Jazz Skyline	Savoy	1956	
1956-01-23	Jackson's Ville	Savoy	1956	
1956-01-17, -21, 1956-02-14	Ballads & Blues	Atlantic	1956	
1957-01-05, -07	Plenty, Plenty Soul	Atlantic	1957	
1957-05-21, 1957-06-10, -17	Bags & Flutes	Atlantic	1957	
1957-09-12, 1958-04-10	Soul Brothers	Atlantic	1958	with Ray Charles
1958-04-10	Soul Meeting	Atlantic	1961	with Ray Charles
1958-09-12	Bean Bags	Atlantic	1959	with Coleman Hawkins
1958-12-28, -29	Bags' Opus	United Artists	1959	
1959-01-15	Bags & Trane	Atlantic	1961	with John Coltrane
1959-05-01, 1959-09-09, -10	The Ballad Artistry of Milt Jackson	Atlantic	1959	
1960-02-23, -24, 1961-03-14	Vibrations	Atlantic	1964	
1961-12-14, -15	Statements	Impulse!	1962	
1961-12-18, -19	Bags Meets Wes!	Riverside	1962	with Wes Montgomery
1962-06-19, -20, 1962-07-05	Big Bags	Riverside	1962	
1962-08-30, 1962-10-31, 1962-11-07	Invitation	Riverside	1963	
1963-03-18, 1963-08-05	For Someone I Love	Riverside	1966	
1963-05-16, -17, 1963-12-20	Milt Jackson Quintet Live at the Village Gate	Riverside	1967	live
1964-01-13, -14	Much in Common	Verve	1964	with Ray Brown
1964-08-06, -07	Jazz 'n' Samba	Impulse!	1964	
1964-12-09, -14, -28	In a New Setting	Limelight	1965	
1965-01-04, -05	Ray Brown / Milt Jackson	Verve	1965	with Ray Brown
1965-08-12	Milt Jackson at the Museum of Modern Art	Limelight	1965	live
1966-12-15	Born Free	Limelight	1967	
1968-05-09, 1968-06-03, -17	Milt Jackson and the Hip String Quartet	Verve	1968	
1969-08-01, -02	That's the Way It Is	Impulse!	1970	live featuring Ray Brown
1969-08-01, -02	Just the Way It Had to Be	Impulse!	1970	live featuring Ray Brown
1969-10-09, -10	Memphis Jackson	Impulse!	1970	with the Ray Brown Big Band
1972-12-12, -13	Sunflower	CTI	1973	
1972-12, 1973-12	Goodbye	CTI	1974	with Hubert Laws
1974-01	Olinga	CTI	1974	
1975-07	The Milt Jackson Big 4	Pablo	1975	live
1975-08	The Big 3	Pablo	1975	with Joe Pass and Ray Brown
1976-03	At The Kosei Nenkin	Pablo	1977	[2LP] live
1976-03	At the Kosei Nenkin vol. 2: Centerpiece	Pablo	2002	Posthumous release, mostly unissued tracks from the live session
1976-04	Feelings	Pablo	1976	
1977-02	Quadrant	Pablo	1977	with Joe Pass, Ray Brown, and Mickey Roker
1977-06	Soul Fusion	Pablo	1978	with The Monty Alexander Trio
1977-07	Montreux '77	Pablo	1977	with Ray Brown
1978-01-18	Milt Jackson & Count Basie & the Big Band, Vol. 1	Pablo	1978	with Count Basie
1979-01	Milt Jackson & Count Basie & the Big Band, Vol. 2	Pablo	1979	with Count Basie
1979-11-11	Loose Walk	Palcoscenico	1980	with Sonny Stitt
1980-01-21	All Too Soon: The Duke Ellington Album	Pablo	1980	with Ray Brown, Mickey Roker & Joe Pass
1980-04-14	Night Mist	Pablo/OJC	1981	
1981-11-30	Ain't But a Few of Us Left	Pablo	1982	with Oscar Peterson
1982-04-23, -24	A London Bridge	Pablo	1988	live
1982-04-23, -24	Mostly Duke	Pablo	1991	live
1982-04-28	In London: Memories of Thelonious Sphere Monk	Pablo	1982	live at Ronnie Scott's Jazz Club, London
1983-01-20	Two of the Few	Pablo	1983	with Oscar Peterson
1983-05-25, -26	Jackson, Johnson, Brown & Company	Pablo	1983	with J. J. Johnson
1983-11-30, 1983-12-01	Soul Route	Pablo	1984	
1988-03-28, -30	Bebop	EastWest	1988	
1993	Reverence and Compassion	Qwest/WB	1993	
1994?	The Prophet Speaks	Qwest/WB	1994	with Joshua Redman and Joe Williams
1995	Burnin' in the Woodhouse	Qwest/WB	1995	
1997	Sa Va Bella (For Lady Legends)	Qwest/WB	1997	
1998-06-09, -10	Explosive!	Qwest/WB	1999	with the Clayton-Hamilton Jazz Orchestra
1998-11-24 – -26	The Very Tall Band	Telarc	1999	live at Blue Note with Oscar Peterson and Ray Brown

Compilations

- I/We Had a Ball (Limelight, 1965) – rec. 1964
- All Star Bags (Blue Note, 1976)[2LP] – rec. 1952-1957
- Milt Jackson (Quintessence Jazz Series) (Pickwick, 1979)
- The Best of Milt Jackson (Pablo, 1980)

=== As leader of the Modern Jazz Quartet ===
Jackson (left) in Seattle, Washington, c. 1980

- Vendome (Prestige, 1952)
- Modern Jazz Quartet, II (Prestige, 1955)
- Concorde (Prestige, 1955)
- Fontessa (Atlantic, 1956)
- The Modern Jazz Quartet at Music Inn (Atlantic, 1956)
- The Modern Jazz Quartet (Atlantic, 1957)
- The Modern Jazz Quartet and the Oscar Peterson Trio at the Opera House (Verve, 1957)
- The Modern Jazz Quartet Plays No Sun in Venice (Atlantic, 1958) – film score rec. 1957
- The Modern Jazz Quartet at Music Inn Volume 2 (Atlantic, 1958)
- Music from Odds Against Tomorrow (United Artists, 1959) – soundtrack
- Third Stream Music (Atlantic, 1960) – rec. 1959–1960, including Sketch for Double String Quartet (1959)
- Pyramid (Atlantic, 1960)
- The Modern Jazz Quartet & Orchestra (Atlantic, 1960)
- European Concert (Atlantic, 1960) – live
- The Comedy (Atlantic, 1962) – recorded in 1960-1962
- Lonely Woman (Atlantic, 1962)
- A Quartet is a Quartet is a Quartet (Atlantic, 1963)
- Collaboration with Laurindo Almeida (Atlantic, 1964)
- The Modern Jazz Quartet Plays George Gershwin's Porgy and Bess (Atlantic, 1965) – rec. 1964–1965
- Jazz Dialogue with the All-Star Jazz Band (Atlantic, 1965)
- Concert in Japan '66 (Atlantic [Japan], 1966)
- Blues at Carnegie Hall (Atlantic, 1966)
- Place Vendôme with The Swingle Singers (Philips, 1966)
- Under the Jasmin Tree (Apple, 1968) – rec. 1967
- Space (Apple, 1969)
- Plastic Dreams (Atlantic, 1971)
- The Legendary Profile (Atlantic, 1972)
- In Memoriam (Little David, 1973)
- Blues on Bach (Atlantic, 1974) – rec. 1973
- The Last Concert (Atlantic, 1974)
- The Only Recorded Performance of Paul Desmond With The Modern Jazz Quartet with Paul Desmond (Finesse/Columbia, 1981) – rec. 1971
- Reunion at Budokan 1981 (Pablo, 1981)
- Together Again: Live at the Montreux Jazz Festival '82 (Pablo, 1982)
- Echoes (Pablo, 1984)
- Topsy: This One's for Basie (Pablo, 1985)
- Three Windows (Atlantic, 1987)
- For Ellington (East West, 1988)
- MJQ & Friends: A 40th Anniversary Celebration (Atlantic, 1994) – rec. 1992–1993
- Dedicated to Connie (Atlantic, 1995) – live rec. 1960
- Lost Tapes: Germany 1956–1958 (Jazzhaus, 2013) – live rec: 1956–1958

=== As a member ===
- CTI All-Stars, CTI Summer Jazz at the Hollywood Bowl (CTI, 1991)[2CD] – rec. 1972

=== As sideman ===
With Miles Davis

- Quintet / Sextet (Prestige, 1956) – rec. 1955
- Bags' Groove (Prestige, 1957) – rec. 1954
- Miles Davis and the Modern Jazz Giants (Prestige, 1959) – rec. 1954–1956

With Dizzy Gillespie

- The Complete RCA Victor Recordings (Bluebird, 1995) – rec. 1937–1949
- Dee Gee Days: The Savoy Sessions (Savoy, 1976) – rec. 1951–1952
- The Dizzy Gillespie Big 7 (Pablo, 1975)
- Dizzy Gillespie Jam (Pablo, 1977)
- Musician, Composer, Raconteur (Pablo, 1982) – rec. 1981

With Oscar Peterson

- Very Tall (Verve, 1962) – rec. 1961
- Reunion Blues (MPS, 1972) – rec. 1971
- The Oscar Peterson Big 6 at Montreux (Pablo, 1975)

With others

- Cannonball Adderley, Things Are Getting Better (Riverside, 1959) – rec. 1958
- Count Basie, Jam Session at the Montreux Jazz Festival 1975 (Pablo, 1975)
- Dee Dee Bridgewater, Dear Ella (Verve, 1997)
- Wini Brown, Miss Brown For You (Savoy Jazz, 1986) – rec. 1947–1949
- Benny Carter, The King (Pablo, 1976)
- Ray Charles, Just Between Us (Columbia, 1988)
- Kenny Clarke, Telefunken Blues (Savoy, 1955) – rec. 1954–1955
- Roy Eldridge, What It's All About (Pablo, 1976)
- Steve Miller, Born 2 B Blue (Capitol, 1988)
- Hank Mobley, Hank Mobley and His All Stars (Blue Note, 1957)
- Don Sebesky, Giant Box (CTI, 1973)
- The Temptations, For Lovers Only (Motown, 1995)
- Big Joe Turner, Nobody In Mind (Pablo, 1976)
- Stanley Turrentine, Cherry (CTI, 1972)
- Dinah Washington, Mellow Mama (Delmark, 1992) – rec. 1945
