= The Swingles discography =

Recordings by a cappella vocal group

The Paris-based Swingle Singers recorded regularly for Philips in the 1960s and early 1970s and the successor London-based group continued to record, for Columbia / CBS, Virgin Classics and other record labels from 1974 to the present.

== The Swingle Singers (Paris, 1962 – 1973) ==
- Jazz Sébastien Bach (1963) Philips – a.k.a. Bach's Greatest Hits
- Going Baroque / de Bach aux Baroques (1964) Philips
- Swinging Mozart (1965) Philips – a.k.a. Anyone for Mozart?
- Les Romantiques (1965) Philips – a.k.a. Getting Romantic
- Swingling Telemann (1966) Philips – a.k.a. Rococo À Go Go
- Place Vendôme with the Modern Jazz Quartet (1966) Philips – a.k.a. Encounter
- Sounds of Spain: Concerto d'Aranjuez (1967) Philips – a.k.a. Spanish Masters
- Operazione San Pietro (movie soundtrack) (1968) C.A.M.
- Noëls Sans Passeport (1968) Philips – a.k.a. Christmastime
- Jazz Sébastien Bach, Vol. 2 (1968) Philips – a.k.a. Back to Bach
- American Look (1969) Philips
- Sinfonia: Luciano Berio conducting the New York Philharmonic and Swingle Singers (1969) Columbia / CBS
- Faisceaux-Diffractions / Swingle Novae (1972) Barclay / Inédits ORTF (The Swingle Singers appear on Michel Zbar's Swingle Novae, the second side of this LP.)
- The Joy of Singing (1972) Philips – a.k.a. Les 4 Saisons, "Le Printemps"
- Bitter Ending (1972) Epic

== Swingle II / The Swingles / The (New) Swingle Singers (London, 1974 – present) ==
- Madrigals / Love Songs for Madrigals and Madriguys (1974) CBS 80147 / Columbia
- Words & Music (1974) CBS
- Rags and All that Jazz (1976) CBS
- Lovin' You: Words and Music Vol. 2 (1976) CBS 81546
- Baroque (1976) CBS
- Luciano Berio and Swingle II - A-Ronne / Cries Of London (1976) Decca
- English and French Songs (1977) RCA
- Pieces of Eight (1977) CBS 82305
- Swingle Bells (1978) Moss Music Group / EMI
- No Time to Talk (1979) CBS
- Swingle Skyliner (1979) Moss Music Group / EMI
- Folio (1980) Moss Music Group / EMI
- The Swingle Singers "Live" in New York '82 (2006) Swing CD R01 (archive release)
- Reflections (1985)
- Instrumentals (1986), Polydor
- Live at Ronnie Scott's (1987)
- The Swingle Singers Christmas Album (1987) Swing CD 3 - Made in England
- Nothing But Blue Skies (1988) TRAX (Modem 1009)
- Azio Corghi: Mazapegul, Ballet for vocal octet and oboe composed in 1985, recorded on Dischi Ricordi CRMCD 1006 (1988)
- 1812 (1989) Swing CD4, reissued by Virgin Classics (1995) – a mix of 8 studio and 7 live tracks
- The Bach Album (1991) Swing CD5, reissued by Virgin Classics as Bach Hits Back (1994) augmented of 5 tracks
- A Cappella Amadeus, A Mozart Celebration (1991) Virgin Classics
- Around the World, Folk Songs (1991) Virgin Classics – a.k.a. (Around the World) Folk Music
- Luciano Berio: Sinfonia, Eindrücke (1992) Erato – performance with the Orchestre National de France conducted by Pierre Boulez
- Notability (1993) Swing CD7
- The Story of Christmas (1994) Swing CD8, reissued by Primarily A Cappella (1998)
- Pretty Ring Time (1994) Swing CD9
- New World (1995) Swing CD10
- The Swingle Singers Sing Irving Berlin (1996) Sanctuary Records. Re-issue of Nothing But Blue Skies, The Irving Berlin Songbook, a.k.a. A Celebration of the Voice a.k.a. Top Hat White Tie and Tails (2009)
- The Swingle Singers, Live! (1997) Swing CD11
- Screen Tested (1998) Swing CD12
- Noels San Passeport) (2000)
- Ticket to Ride - A Beatles Tribute (1999) Swing CD15, reissued by Primarily A Cappella (2002)
- Keyboard Classics (2000) Swing CD16, reissued by Primarily A Cappella (2002) – a.k.a. Dabadaba Classics, King
- Live in Japan (2001) Swing CD17 (recorded in December 2000)
- Mood Swings (2002) Swing CD18 – Primarily A Cappella, a.k.a. Dabadaba Swing, King
- Retrospective: The 40th Anniversary Show (2003) Swing CD19 - Primarily A Cappella (live)
- Unwrapped (2004) Swing CD20 - Signum – a.k.a. Just Voices: A Cappella Christmas (Evosound)
- The Swingle Singers (2005)
- Dido's Lament (2005) Swing CD S01 – EP
- Beauty and the Beatbox (2007) Signum – with beatbox artist, Shlomo
- Anthology (2009)
- A Celebration of the Voice (2009)
- Ferris Wheels (2009) Swing CD22
- Spotlight on Bach {2010)
- Yule Songs (2011) Swing CD23 – EP
- Back to Bach (2012)
- Weather to Fly (2013) World Village
- Deep End (2015)
- Yule Songs II (2015)
- Folklore (2017)
- A Cappella Christmas Favorites (2018)
- Snapshots, Volume 1 (2020)
- Snapshots, Volume 2 (2021)
- Theatreland (2024)

== Notable compilations ==
- Anyone for Mozart, Bach, Handel, Vivaldi? (1986) Philips / Phonogram France – a single disc combining Anyone for Mozart? (a.k.a. Swinging Mozart) and Going Baroque (a.k.a. de Bach aux Baroques), minus one track from the latter ("Allegro" from Händel's Concerto Grosso Op. 6)
- Compact Jazz: The Swingle Singers (1987) Mercury – a single disc compilation of the complete Place Vendôme collaboration of the Paris-based Swingle Singers with the Modern Jazz Quartet (a.k.a. Encounter), complemented with 6 tracks from Getting Romantic and 3 tracks from Spanish Masters / Sounds of Spain
- Compilation Album (Reflections & Live at Ronnie Scotts) (1989) Swing CD1/2
- Jazz Sebastian Bach (2000) Philips / Phonogram – a single disc combining Bach's Greatest Hits (a.k.a. Jazz Sébastien Bach) and Back to Bach (a.k.a. Jazz Sébastien Bach 2)
- Swingle Singers (2005) Philips – 11 disc boxed set of all 11 Philips recordings (from 1963~1972) by the original Swingle Singers
- (Best of) The Swingle Singers (2005) Virgin Classics – a single disc compilation of 15 tracks from the 4 albums from the London-based group published in the early 1990s by Virgin Classics: 1 track from 1812, 5 tracks from Bach Hits Back, 5 tracks from Around the World, Folk Songs and 4 tracks from A Cappella Amadeus, A Mozart Celebration. The same compilation had been published by Virgin France in 1991 with the title Swingle Singers La Compilation
- The Swingle Singers: Anthology (2009) Virgin Classics – 4 disc boxed set of the 4 previously released Virgin Classics albums from the London-based group of the late 1980s / early 1990s
- Swing Sing (2009) Sony – a single disc compilation of tracks from Swingle II (London) recordings of the 1970s on CBS Records, culled from Rags and All that Jazz (complete), Lovin' You: Words and Music vol. 2 (6 tracks), Words and Music (2 tracks) and No Time to Talk (1 track)
- Collection (2011) (SWINGCD-B1) - box set of 3 previously released SWINGCD albums: Ticket To Ride (1999), Keyboard Classics (2000), and Mood Swings (2002)

== Other recordings ==
- Idsteiner Schloss Konzerte 79/80
- Sonnets of Desolation / Visions and Spels (1984) Composers Recordings, Inc. (CRI) SD 515 – "features The New Swingle Singers on side one performing Ben Johnston's "Sonnets of Desolation" and the New Verbal Workshop on side two performing Johnston's "Visions and Spels"
- Let's All Get Together (1984) – with Ad Libitum and The Bengt Hallberg Trio

== References and external links ==
- The Swingles website
- Swingle Singers discography at allmusic.com
- The Swingle Singers at singers.com
- Olive Simpson discography
- www.singers.com
- bbc.uk
- discogs.com
- microgroove.jp Philips discography
- latitude45arts.com
