= Compact Jazz: The Swingle Singers =

Compilation album by The Swingle Singers
- Released: 1987
- Recorded: 1965–1967
- Genre: Vocal jazz
- Length: 60:24
- Label: Mercury

Alternative cover / title
- Universal (Japan) release

Professional ratings
Review scores
Source	Rating
Allmusic	4.5/5 stars

Compact Jazz: The Swingle Singers is a compilation album of previously released tracks from 3 Philips Swingle Singers recordings: Place Vendôme (a.k.a. Encounter) (7 tracks / complete), Getting Romantic (a.k.a. Les Romantiques) (6 tracks) and Spanish Masters (a.k.a. Sounds of Spain) (3 tracks).

== Track listing ==
1. "Air for G String" (Bach) (Note: Arranged by John Lewis) (Note: Arranged by Ward Swingle) (Note: tracks from Place Vendôme) – 5:37
2. "Zortzico" (Albéniz) (Note: tracks from Getting Romantic) – 2:05
3. "Scherzo" ("Sonata op. 24 for violin and piano") (Beethoven) – 1:11
4. "Three Windows" (John Lewis) – 7:09
5. "Aranjuez" (after the "Adagio", 2nd movement of the Concierto de Aranjuez) (Vidre) (Note: tracks from Spanish Masters) – 4:18
6. "When I am Laid in Earth" ("Dido's Lament") (Purcell) – 5:03
7. "Tango in D Major" (No. 2 from "España" op. 165) – 2:12
8. "Etude Op. 25 No. 2" (Chopin) – 1:27
9. "Vendome" (Lewis) – 3:31
10. "Le Marche de Limoges" ("Pictures at an Exhibition") (Mussorgsky) – 1:23
11. "Little David's Fugue" ("Sascha") (Lewis) – 4:15
12. "Andante" (Quartet op. 44 no. 1) (Mendelssohn) – 3:28
13. "Ricercare à 6" (from "The Musical Offering") (Bach){ – 6:29
14. "Romance Espagnole" ("Jeux Interdits" / "Spanish Romance") (anonymous) – 2:34
15. "Alexander's Fugue" (Lewis) – 4:50
16. "Little Prelude and Fugue" ("Album for the Young") (Schumann) – 2:09

== Personnel ==
The Swingle Singers:

- Christiane Legrand – soprano
- Jeanette Baucomont – soprano
- Claudine Meunier – alto
- Alice Herald – alto
- Ward Swingle – tenor, arranger
- Claude Germain – tenor
- Jean Cussac – bass
- José Germain – bass

Rhythm section:

- Daniel Humair – drums
- Guy Pedersen – double bass

The Modern Jazz Quartet:

- John Lewis – piano
- Milt Jackson – vibraphone
- Percy Heath – double bass
- Connie Kay – drums
