= Swingle Singers (Philips boxed set) =

Box set by The Swingle Singers
- Released: 2005
- Recorded: 1963–1972
- Genre: Vocal jazz
- Length: ~5 hours 30 minutes
- Label: Philips

Swingle Singers,... ("two-fer" re-issue series)

Compilation album
- Released: 2000–2005
- Recorded: 1963–1972
- Length: ~5 hours (~1 hour per 2 CD release)
- Label: Philips / Emarcy

The 2005 Philips boxed set, Swingle Singers is a compilation of all eleven of the Paris-based Swingle Singers' recordings made for Philips between 1963 and 1972. Ten of the eleven disks included in this boxed set had also been re-issued previously by Philips (Emarcy) in five "two-fer" compilation sets over the preceding five years.

== Contents ==
- Disk 1: Jazz Sébastien Bach a.k.a. Bach's Greatest Hits (1963)
- Disk 2: Jazz Sébastien Bach Vol. 2 a.k.a. Back to Bach (1968)
- Disk 3: Noëls Sans Passeport a.k.a. Christmastime (1968)
- Disk 4: Going Baroque / de Bach aux Baroques (1964)
- Disk 5: Swinging Mozart a.k.a. Anyone for Mozart? (1965)
- Disk 6: Les Romantiques a.k.a. Getting Romantic (1965)
- Disk 7: Swingling Telemann a.k.a. Rococo Á Go Go (1966)
- Disk 8: Les Quatre Saisons a.k.a. The Joy of Singing (1972)
- Disk 9: Sounds of Spain: Concerto d'Aranjuez a.k.a. Spanish Masters (1967)
- Disk 10: American Look (1969)
- Disk 11: Place Vendôme a.k.a. Encounter (1966)

== Personnel ==
The Swingle Singers = 8 voices: 2 sopranos, 2 altos, 2 tenors and 2 basses (accompanied by only a drummer and double bassist)

- Christiane Legrand – soprano
- Jeanette Baucomont – soprano (1963–1968)
- Nicole Darde – soprano (1969–1972)
- Claudine Meunier – alto
- Anne Germain – alto (1963–1965)
- Alice Herald – alto (1965–1966)
- Hélène Devos – alto (1967–1972)
- Ward Swingle – tenor, arranger
- Claude Germain – tenor (1963–1966)
- Joseph Noves – tenor (1967–1972)
- Jean Cussac – bass
- Jean Claude Briodin – bass (1963–1964)
- José Germain – bass (1965–1972)

Rhythm section:

- Andre Arpino – drums (1963)
- Gus Wallez – drums (1963–1964)
- Daniel Humair – drums (1965–1968)
- Bernard Lubat – drums (1968)
- Roger Fugen – drums (1969–1972)
- Pierre Michelot – double bass (1963)
- Guy Pedersen – double bass (1964–1968)
- Jacky Cavallero – double bass (1969–1972)

The Modern Jazz Quartet (on Encounter / Place Vendôme only):

- John Lewis – piano
- Milt Jackson – vibraphone
- Percy Heath – double bass
- Connie Kay – drums
