= Rococo Á Go Go =

Studio album by The Swingle Singers
- Released: 1966
- Recorded: 1966
- Genre: Vocal jazz
- Label: Philips
- Producer: Pierre Fatosme

The Swingle Singers chronology
Getting Romantic (1965)	Rococo Á Go Go (1966)	Encounter / Place Vendôme (1966)

alternative cover
- U.S. LP cover

Rococo Á Go Go (released as Swingling Telemann in France) is the fifth album released by the Swingle Singers. The album was nominated for a 1966 Grammy Award.

All tracks from this album are also included on the 11 disk Philips boxed set, Swingle Singers.

== Track listing ==
Tracks 1 - 5 from Concerto for flute, violin & strings in E minor ("Concerto à Sei"), TWV 52:e3 (Telemann)

1. "Allegro" – 2:27
2. "Adagio" – 1:25
3. "Presto" – 1:08
4. "Adagio" – 0:34
5. "Allegro" – 2:08
6. "21e ordre for harpsichord (Pièces de clavecin, IV) (Couperin) – 2:51
7. "Overture: La Lyra, suite for strings & continuo in E flat major, TWV 55 (Telemann) – 1:43
8. "Work(s) ~ Unspecified Fugue in D minor (Muffat) – 3:03
9. "Trio for flute, violin & continuo in E major" (Essercizii Musici No. 9/1) (Telemann) – 1:27
10. "Concerto for oboe d'amore, strings & continuo in A major," TWV 51:A2 ~ Lar (Telemann) – 3:09
11. "Le Coucou, rondeau for harpsichord in E minor" (Pièces de clavecin, Suite N (Daquin) – 1:42
12. "Sonata for recorder & continuo in E minor," SF. 764 (Op. 2/4 or in D min) (Marcello) – 1:54
13. "Work(s) ~ Sonata in C minor: Allegro" (Quantz) – 1:49
14. "Work(s) ~ Sonata in C minor: Andante Moderato" (Quantz) – 2:59
15. "Work(s) ~ Sonata in C minor: Vivace" (Quantz) – 1:57

== Personnel ==
Vocals:

- Jeanette Baucomont – soprano
- Christiane Legrand – soprano
- Alice Herald – alto
- Claudine Meunier – alto
- Ward Swingle – tenor, arranger
- Claude Germain – tenor
- Jean Cussac – baritone
- José Germain – bass

Rhythm section:

- Guy Pedersen – double bass
- Daniel Humair – drums
