= Operazione San Pietro (soundtrack) =

Soundtrack album by The Swingle Singers
- Released: 1968
- Genres: Soundtrack; Vocal jazz
- Length: 24:20
- Label: C.A.M.
- Producer: Pierre Fatosme

The Swingle Singers chronology
| Spanish Masters (1967) | Operazione San Pietro (1968) | Christmastime (1968) |

Operazione San Pietro (Operation St. Peter's) is a soundtrack album for the 1967 Lucio Fulci movie of the same name - with music by Ward Swingle performed by The Swingle Singers.

== Track listing ==
1. "Titoli: Operazione San Pietro" – 1:54
2. "Operazione Recupero" – 1:48
3. "Francescani All'attacc" – 1:43
4. "Sua Eminenza" – 1:01
5. "Tre Imbroglioni Per Un Cardinale" – 1:46
6. "Il Clero Alla Riscossa" – 1:09
7. "Meglio La Liberta'" – 0:57
8. "L' Americana" – 1:54
9. "Flash" – 1:46
10. "Verso La Capitale" – 1:41
11. "Grand Hotel" – 1:49
12. "Fuga In Bulldozer" – 1:50
13. "One Dollar" – 1:40
14. "Furtivo" – 1:32
15. "L' Indecisione Del Cajella" – 1:10

== Personnel ==
=== Vocals ===
- Jeanette Baucomont – soprano
- Christiane Legrand – soprano
- Hélène Devos – alto
- Claudine Meunier – alto
- Ward Swingle – tenor, arranger
- Joseph Noves – tenor
- Jean Cussac – bass
- José Germain – bass

=== Rhythm section ===
- Guy Pedersen – double bass
- Daniel Humair or Bernard Lubat – drums
