= Going Baroque =

Studio album by The Swingle Singers
- Released: 1964
- Recorded: 1964
- Genre: Vocal jazz
- Length: 24:37
- Label: Philips
- Producer: Pierre Fatosme

The Swingle Singers chronology
Jazz Sébastien Bach (1963)	Going Baroque (1964)	Anyone for Mozart? (1965)

alternative cover
- U.S. LP cover

Going Baroque (released as Going Baroque: de Bach aux Baroques in France) is the second album released by the Paris-based Swingle Singers. The album was a 1965 Grammy Award winner for "Best Performance by a Chorus."

Tracks from this album are also included on the CD re-issue / compilation, Anyone for Mozart, Bach, Handel, Vivaldi? and on the 11 disk Philips boxed set, Swingle Singers.

== Track listing ==
1. "Badinerie" from Ouvertüre H-Moll, BWV 1067 (J.S. Bach) – 1:21
2. "Aria And Variations" ("The Harmonious Blacksmith") from Cembalo suite in E-Dur (G.F. Händel) – 2:25
3. "Gigue" from Cello suite Nr. 3 C-Dur, BWV 1009 (J.S. Bach) – 1:21
4. "Largo" from Cembalo konzert F-Moll, BWV 1056 (J.S. Bach) – 3:02
5. "Praeludium Nr. 19 A-Dur" (Note: from The Well-Tempered Clavier, Book I) BWV 864 (J.S. Bach) – 1:11
6. "Praeambulum" from Partita Nr. 5 G-Dur BWV 829 (J.S. Bach) – 2:27
7. "Fuga" from Concerto Op. 3 'L'Estro Armonico' Nr. 11 D-Moll (Vivaldi) – 2:24
8. "Allegro" from Concerto Grosso Op. 6 A-Moll (G.F. Händel) – 3:16
9. "Praeludium Nr. 7 Es-Dur" (Note: from The Well-Tempered Clavier, Book II) BWV 876 (J.S. Bach) – 2:42
10. "Solfegietto C-Moll" (C.P.E. Bach) – 0:57
11. "Frühling" (Spring) (W.F. Bach) – 1:35
12. "Praeludium Nr. 24 H-Moll" (Note: from The Well-Tempered Clavier, Book II) BWV 893 (J.S. Bach) – 1:56

== Personnel ==
Vocals:

- Jeanette Baucomont – soprano
- Christiane Legrand – soprano
- Anne Germain – alto
- Claudine Meunier – alto
- Ward Swingle – tenor, arranger
- Claude Germain – tenor
- Jean Cussac – bass
- Jean Claude Briodin – bass

Rhythm section:

- Guy Pedersen – double bass
- Gus Wallez – Percussion
