= Anyone for Mozart, Bach, Handel, Vivaldi? =

Compilation album by The Swingle Singers
- Released: 1986
- Recorded: 1964–1965
- Genre: Jazz pop
- Length: 49:55
- Label: Philips/Verve

2 CD reissue (c. 2001)
- Going Baroque... + Swinging Mozart

Professional ratings
Review scores
Source	Rating
Allmusic	4/5 stars

Anyone for Mozart, Bach, Handel, Vivaldi? is a CD compilation re-issue of music by the Swingle Singers. It combines tracks from two previous LP releases, Going Baroque (tracks 6 – 16) and Swinging Mozart (a.k.a. Anyone for Mozart?) (tracks 1 – 5).

== Track listing ==
1. "Piano Sonata No. 15 in C major" ("Sonata semplice") K. 545 (W. A. Mozart) – 6:19
  1. "Allegro"
  2. "Andante"
  3. "Allegretto"
2. "Variations (12) on 'Ah, vous dirai-je maman' for piano in C major" K. 265 (K. 300e) (Mozart) – 5:51
3. "Piano Sonata No. 13 in B flat major" K. 333 (K. 315c) ~ Allegro (Mozart) – 2:51
4. "Sonata for violin & piano No. 29 in A major" (fragment), K. 402 (K. 385) (Mozart) – 2:52
5. "Serenade No. 13 for strings in G major" ("Eine kleine Nachtmusik") K. 525 (Mozart) – 10:16
  1. "Allegro"
  2. "Romance"
  3. "Menuetto"
  4. "Rondo"
6. "Badinerie" from Orchestral Suite No. 2 in B minor, BWV 1067 (J.S. Bach) – 1:21
7. "Air" from Suite for keyboard (Suite de piece), Vol.1, No.5 in E major (G.F. Händel) – 2:25
8. "Gigue" from Suite for solo cello No. 3 in C major, BWV 1009 (J.S. Bach) – 1:21
9. "Largo" from Concerto for harpsichord, strings & continuo No. 5 in F minor, BWV 1056 (J.S. Bach) – 3:02
10. "Prelude" Prelude and Fugue, for keyboard No. 19 in A major BWV 864 (BC L98) (J.S. Bach) – 1:11
11. "Praeambule" Partita for keyboard No. 5 in G major, BWV 829 (BC L5) (J.S. Bach) – 2:27
12. "Fugue" from Concerto for 2 violins, cello, strings & continuo in D minor ("L'estro armonico" No. 11), Op. 3/11, RV 565 (Vivaldi) – 2:24
13. "Prelude" from Prelude and Fugue, for keyboard No. 7 in E flat major BWV 876 (BC L110) (J.S. Bach) – 2:42
14. "Solfeggio, for piano in C minor," H. 220, Wq. 117/2 (C.P.E. Bach) – 0:57
15. "Frühling" (Spring) (W.F. Bach) – 1:35
16. "Prelude" from Prelude and Fugue, for keyboard No. 24 in B minor" BWV 893 (BC L127) (J.S. Bach) – 1:56

== Personnel ==
Vocals:

- Jeanette Baucomont – soprano
- Christiane Legrand – soprano
- Anne Germain – alto
- Alice Herald – alto (tracks 1 - 5)
- Claudine Meunier – alto (tracks 6 - 16)
- Ward Swingle – tenor, arranger
- Claude Germain – tenor
- Jean Cussac – baritone
- José Germain – bass (tracks 1 - 5)
- Jean Claude Briodin – bass (tracks 6 - 16)

Rhythm section:

- Guy Pedersen – double bass
- Daniel Humair – drums (tracks 1 - 5)
- Gus Wallez – percussion (tracks 6 - 16)
