= American Look =

Studio album by The Swingle Singers
- Released: 1969
- Genre: Vocal jazz
- Length: 29:48
- Label: Philips
- Producer: Pierre Fatosme

The Swingle Singers chronology
Back to Bach (1968)	American Look (1969)	Sinfonia (Berio) (1969)

American Look is a 1969 album by the Swingle Singers on the Philips Records label. All tracks from this album are also included on the 11 disk Philips boxed set, Swingle Singers.

== Track listing ==
1. Country Dances (invention for vocal ensemble: "Arkansas Traveller" / "College Hornpipe" / "Devil's Dream" / "Old Zip Coon" / "Virginia Reel" / "Pop Goes the Weasel") – 2:15
2. "When Jesus Wept" (William Billings) – 2:07
3. Negro Spirituals (for vocal ensemble: "Joshua Fit the Battle of Jericho" / "Swing Low, Sweet Chariot" / "Little David" / "Deep River") – 3:52
4. Patriotic Songs (invention for vocal ensemble: "Dixie" / "Yankee Doodle" / "Battle Hymn of the Republic") – 2:07
5. "He's Gone Away" (trad.) – 2:12
6. "Saint's Fugue" (based on "When the Saints Go Marchin' In" for vocal ensemble) (Swingle) – 2:18
7. Stephen Foster Medley: "Old Folks at Home"; "Beautiful Dreamer"; "Camptown Races"; "Jeannie with the Light Brown Hair" (Foster) – 3:26

from the opera, Porgy and Bess (Gershwin):

8. "My Man's Gone Now" – 2:51
9. "It Ain't Necessarily So" – 1:59
10. "Summertime" – 1:58
11. "I Got Plenty of Nothin'" – 2:03
12. "Bess You Is My Woman" – 2:40

== Personnel ==
Vocals:

- Christiane Legrand – soprano
- Nicole Darde – soprano
- Hélène Devos – alto
- Claudine Meunier – alto
- Ward Swingle – tenor, arranger
- Joseph Noves – tenor
- Jean Cussac – bass
- José Germain – bass

Rhythm section:

- Jacky Cavallero – double bass
- Roger Fugen – drums
