= The Joy of Singing =

Studio album by The Swingle Singers
- Released: 1972
- Genres: a cappella, baroque
- Length: 32:05
- Label: Philips

The Swingle Singers chronology
Sinfonia (Berio) (1969)	The Joy of Singing (1972)	Bitter Ending (1972)

alternative cover

The Joy of Singing, a.k.a. Les 4 Saisons ("Le Printemps") is a 1972 album by the Swingle Singers on the Philips Records label. All tracks from this album are also included on the 11 disk Philips boxed set, Swingle Singers.

== Track listing ==
Tracks 1–3 from Vivaldi's Four Seasons (Note: Violin Concerto, for violin, strings & continuo in E major ("La Primavera," The Four Seasons; "Il cimento" No. 1), Op.8/1, RV 269)

1. "Allegro" (Vivaldi) – 3:06
2. "Largo" (Vivaldi) – 2:43
3. "Allegro (Danse pastorale)" (Vivaldi) – 3:19
4. "Canon in D major," instrumental arrangement (Pachelbel) – 4:23
5. "Sinfonia," Cantata No. 209, "Non sa che sia dolore," BWV 209 (BC G50) (Bach) – 3:32
6. "Adagio," Concerto for oboe, strings & continuo in D minor, SF. 935 (Marcello) – 3:06
7. "Le nozze di Figaro" ("The Marriage of Figaro"), opera, K. 492~Ouverture (Mozart) – 3:58
8. "Allegro," Concerto for 2 violins, strings & continuo in D minor ("Double"), BWV 1043 (Bach) – 3:50
9. "Fugue - Molto Allegro," String Quartet No. 14 in G major ("Spring"), K. 387 (Mozart) – 4:08

== Personnel ==
Vocals:

- Christiane Legrand – soprano
- Nicole Darde – soprano
- Hélène Devos – alto
- Claudine Meunier – alto
- Ward Swingle – tenor, arranger
- Joseph Noves – tenor
- Jean Cussac – bass
- José Germain – bass

Rhythm section:

- Jacky Cavallero – double bass
- Roger Fugen – drums
