= Bitter Ending =

Studio album by The Swingle Singers
- Released: 1972
- Length: ~30 minutes
- Label: Epic 80544

The Swingle Singers chronology
The Joy of Singing (1972)	Bitter Ending (1972)

Swingle II chronology
Madrigals (1974)

Bitter Ending is a recording of a work for eight voices composed by Andre Hodeir as commissioned by Ward Swingle. The work is performed by the Swingle Singers with a jazz quintet. This was the last work by Hodeir and is inspired by James Joyce's Finnegans Wake

== Personnel ==
- Roger Guérin – trumpet
- Pierre Gossez – saxophone
- Jean-Louis Chautemps – saxophone
- Jacques (Jacky) Cavallero – double bass
- Marcel Sabiani – drums

The Swingle Singers:

- Christiane Legrand – soprano
- Nicole Darde – soprano
- Hélène Devos – alto
- Claudine Meunier – alto
- Ward Swingle – tenor, arranger
- Joseph Noves – tenor
- Jean Cussac – bass
- José Germain – bass
