= Place Vendôme (Swingle Singers with MJQ album) =

Studio album by The Swingle Singers with the Modern Jazz Quartet
- Released: 1966
- Recorded: September 27 and October 30, 1966 in Paris
- Genre: Vocal jazz
- Length: 37:07
- Label: Philips
- Producer: Pierre Fatosme

Swingle Singers chronology
Rococo Á Go Go (1966)	Place Vendôme (1966)	Spanish Masters (1967)

Modern Jazz Quartet chronology
Blues at Carnegie Hall (1966)	Place Vendôme (1966)	Live at the Lighthouse (1967)

Milt Jackson chronology
Blues at Carnegie Hall (1966)	Place Vendôme (1966)	Milt Jackson Quintet Live at the Village Gate (1967)

alternative cover
- U.S. LP cover

Professional ratings
Review scores
Source	Rating
Allmusic	2.5/5 stars

Place Vendôme (released as Encounter in the U.S.) is an album released by the Swingle Singers performing with the Modern Jazz Quartet. This album as Encounter was a 1968 Grammy award nominee for Best Performance By A Chorus.

All tracks from this album are also included on the Mercury compilation CD Compact Jazz: The Swingle Singers and the 11 disk Philips boxed set, Swingle Singers.

== Track listing ==
1. "Sascha" (Little David's Fugue) (John Lewis) – 4:18
2. "Orchestral Suite No. 3 in D major," (aka "Air on the G String") BWV 1068 (J. S. Bach) – 5:41
3. "Vendôme" (Lewis) – 3:32
4. "The Musical Offering" (Musikalisches Opfer), for keyboard and chamber instruments, BWV 1079 (Bach) – 6:34
5. "When I am Laid in Earth" (from Dido and Aeneas), soprano aria ("Dido's Lament") (Henry Purcell) – 5:05
6. "Alexander's Fugue" (Lewis) – 4:53
7. "Three Windows" (Lewis) – 7:10

== Personnel ==
The Swingle Singers:

- Jeanette Baucomont – soprano
- Christiane Legrand – soprano
- Alice Herald – alto
- Claudine Meunier – alto
- Ward Swingle – tenor, arranger
- Claude Germain – tenor
- Jean Cussac – bass
- José Germain – bass

The Modern Jazz Quartet:

- John Lewis – piano
- Milt Jackson – vibraphone
- Percy Heath – double bass
- Connie Kay – drums
