= Back to Bach =

Studio album by The Swingle Singers
- Released: 1968
- Recorded: 1968
- Genre: Vocal jazz
- Length: 30:56
- Label: Philips
- Producer: Pierre Fatosme

The Swingle Singers chronology
Christmastime (1968)	Back to Bach (1968)	American Look (1969)

alternative cover
- U.S. LP cover

Back to Bach (released as Jazz Sébastien Bach, Vol. 2 in France) is a 1968 album released by the Paris-based Swingle Singers.

All tracks from this album are also included on the CD re-issue / compilation, Jazz Sebastian Bach (combined with all tracks from 1963's Bach's Greatest Hits a.k.a. Jazz Sébastien Bach (Vol. 1)) and also on the 11 disk Philips boxed set Swingle Singers.

== Track listing ==
all compositions by J.S. Bach

1. "Vivace" from Concerto for 2 violins, strings & continuo in D minor ("Double"), BWV 1043 – 3:19
2. "Prelude and Fugue, for keyboard No. 10 in E minor" (WTC I), BWV 855 (BC L89) – 3:01
3. "Choral" from Cantata No. 147, "Herz und Mund und Tat und Leben," BWV 147 (BC A174) – 3:28
4. "Gavotte" from Partita for solo violin No. 3 in E major, BWV 1006 – 2:30
5. "Prelude and Fugue, for keyboard No. 1 in C major" (WTC I), BWV 846 (BC L80) – 3:22
6. "Fugue" from Prelude and Fugue, for organ in G major, BWV 541 (BC J22) – 3:19
7. "Adagio" from Sonata for violin & keyboard No. 3 in E major, BWV 1016 – 3:56
8. "Prelude and Fugue, for keyboard No. 3 in C sharp major" (WTC I), BWV 848 (BC L82) – 3:18
9. "Prelude" from "Nun komm der Heiden Heiland" (II), chorale prelude for organ (Achtzehn Choräle No. 8), BWV 659 (BC K82) – 3:30
10. "Fugue" for keyboard No. 21 in B flat major" (WTC I), BWV 866 (BC L100) – 1:24

== Personnel ==
Vocals:

- Jeanette Baucomont – soprano
- Christiane Legrand – soprano
- Hélène Devos – alto
- Claudine Meunier – alto
- Ward Swingle – tenor, arranger
- Joseph Noves – tenor
- Jean Cussac – bass
- Jose Germain – bass

Rhythm section:

- Pierre Michelot – double bass
- Bernard Lubat or Daniel Humair – drums
