= Christmastime (The Swingle Singers album) =

Studio album by The Swingle Singers
- Released: 1968
- Recorded: September 1967 – February 1968
- Genres: Christmas music Vocal jazz
- Length: 31:13
- Label: Philips
- Producer: Pierre Fatosme

The Swingle Singers chronology
Operazione San Pietro (1968)	Christmastime (1968)	Back to Bach (1968)

alternative cover

alternative cover

Christmastime (released as Noëls Sans Passeport in France and Christmas with the Swingle Singers in the Netherlands) is an album of Christmas songs released by the Swingle Singers in 1968 on the Philips Records label. It was reissued with the title Christmas Album (1980). All tracks from this album are also included on the 11 disk Philips boxed set, Swingle Singers.

== Track listing ==
1. Medley: "Jingle Bells" (Pierpont) / "Il Est Ne Le Divin Enfant" / "Es Ist Ein Ros' Entsprungen" – 3:47
2. Medley: "God Rest Ye Merry Gentlemen" / "The First Nowell" / "Go Tell It On the Mountain" – 3:13
3. "Stille Nacht, Heilige Nacht" ("Silent Night") (Gruber, Mohr) – 2:35
4. Medley: "Deck The Halls With Boughs Of Holly" / "What Child Is This?" – 3:12
5. Medley: "O Jul Med Din Glede" / "Komt, Verwondert U Hier Mensen" / "Away in a Manger" – 3:53
6. Medley: "Les Anges dans nos Campagnes" / "Oh Tannenbaum" / "Bel Astre Que J'Adore" – 3:15
7. Medley: "El Noi de la Mare" / "Hanej, Nynej, Jezisku" ("Rocking Carol") / "Canzone Dei Zampognari" – 2:46
8. Medley: "We Three Kings Of Orient Are" (Hopkins) / "The Holly And The Ivy" – 3:11
9. "White Christmas", (Irving Berlin) – 2:12
10. Medley: "Stchedrivka" ("Carol of the Bells") / "Dag Visen" / "O Sanctissima" – 3:09

== Personnel ==
- Pierre Fatosme – producer, engineer

Vocals:

- Jeanette Baucomont – soprano
- Christiane Legrand – soprano
- Hélène Devos – alto
- Claudine Meunier – alto
- Ward Swingle – tenor, arranger
- Joseph Noves – tenor
- Jean Cussac– bass
- José Germain – bass

Rhythm section:

- Guy Pedersen – double bass
- Daniel Humair or Bernard Lubat – drums
