= Spanish Masters =

Studio album by The Swingle Singers
- Released: 1967
- Genre: Vocal jazz
- Length: 29:56
- Label: Philips
- Producer: Pierre Fatosme

The Swingle Singers chronology
Encounter / Place Vendôme (1966)	Spanish Masters (1967)	Operazione San Pietro (1968)

alternative cover
- U.S. LP cover

Spanish Masters (released as Sounds of Spain / Concerto d'Aranjuez in France) is the seventh album released by the Paris-based Swingle Singers. All tracks from this album are also included on the 11 disk Philips boxed set, Swingle Singers.

== Track listing ==
Side 'A':

1. "Romanza Andaluza," for violin & piano, Op. 22/1 (Pablo de Sarasate) – 2:50
2. "Concierto de Aranjuez," for guitar & orchestra: Adagio (Joaquín Rodrigo) – 4:22
3. "Spanish Dances" (12), in 4 volumes for piano, Op. 37, H. 142, DLR 1:2: 6. Rondalla Aragonesa in D major (Enrique Granados) – 2:33
4. "España," album leaves (6) for piano, Op. 165, B. 37: 2. Tango in D major (Isaac Albéniz) – 2:15
5. "Suite española No. 1, for piano, Op. 47, B. 7: 1. Granada" (Albéniz) – 2:49

Side 'B':

1. "Suite española No. 1, for piano, Op. 47, B. 7: 3. Sevilla" (Albéniz) – 3:44
2. "Jeux Interdits" ("Spanish Romance" / "Romance Espagnole"), for guitar (Anonymous) – 2:38
3. "Spanish Dances" (2) (Morceaux charactéristiques), for piano, Op. 164, B. 36: Tango in A minor (Albéniz) – 3:25
4. "Keyboard Sonata No. 84 in D major" (Allegro) (Antonio Soler) – 3:02
5. "Spanish Dances" (12), in 4 volumes for piano, Op. 37, H. 142, DLR 1:2: 5. Andaluza in E minor (Granados) – 2:18

== Personnel ==
Vocals:

- Jeanette Baucomont – soprano
- Christiane Legrand – soprano
- Hélène Devos – alto
- Claudine Meunier – alto
- Ward Swingle – tenor, arranger
- Joseph Noves – tenor
- Jean Cussac – bass
- José Germain – bass

Rhythm section:

- Guy Pedersen – double bass
- Daniel Humair – drums
