= Anyone for Mozart? =

Anyone For Mozart?

Studio album by The Swingle Singers
- Released: 1965
- Recorded: 1965
- Genre: Vocal jazz
- Length: 28:09
- Label: Philips
- Producer: Pierre Fatosme

The Swingle Singers chronology
Going Baroque (1964)	Anyone For Mozart? (1965)	Getting Romantic (1965)

alternative cover
- U.S. LP cover

Professional ratings
Review scores
Source	Rating
Allmusic	4.5/5 stars

Anyone for Mozart? (released as Swinging Mozart in France) is the third album released by the Swingle Singers. The album was a 1966 Grammy Award winner for "Best Performance by a Chorus."

All tracks from this album are also included on the CD re-issue / compilation, Anyone for Mozart, Bach, Handel, Vivaldi? and on the 11 disk Philips boxed set, Swingle Singers.

== Track listing ==
all compositions by (W.A. Mozart)

1. "Variations (12) on Ah, vous dirai-je maman for piano in C major" K. 265 (K. 300e) – 5:49
2. "Sonata for violin & piano No. 29 (Note: Credited as No. 37) in A major" (fragment), K. 402 (K. 385) – 2:54
3. "Piano Sonata No. 15 in C major" ("Sonata semplice") K. 545 ~ Allegro – 2:11
4. "Piano Sonata No. 15 in C major" ("Sonata semplice") K. 545 ~ Andante – 2:41
5. "Piano Sonata No. 15 in C major" ("Sonata semplice") K. 545 ~ Allegretto – 1:25
6. "Serenade No. 13 for strings in G major" ("Eine kleine Nachtmusik") K. 525 ~ Allegro – 3:24
7. "Serenade No. 13 for strings in G major" ("Eine kleine Nachtmusik") K. 525 ~ Romance – 2:47
8. "Serenade No. 13 for strings in G major" ("Eine kleine Nachtmusik") K. 525 ~ Menuetto – 1:23
9. "Serenade No. 13 for strings in G major" ("Eine kleine Nachtmusik") K. 525 ~ Rondo – 2:44
10. "Piano Sonata No. 5 in G major" K. 283 (K. 189h) ~ Allegro (Note: Some / most French releases indicates the final track is "Allegro" from Piano Sonata No. 5 (K283) while some / most U.S. releases and compilations indicate this "Allegro" is from Piano Sonata No. 14 (K 333)) – 2:51

== Personnel ==
Vocals:

- Jeanette Baucomont – soprano
- Christiane Legrand – soprano
- Alice Herald – alto
- Anne Germain – alto
- Ward Swingle – tenor, arranger
- Claude Germain – tenor
- Jean Cussac – bass
- José Germain – bass

Rhythm section:

- Guy Pedersen – double bass
- Daniel Humair – drums
