= Bach's Greatest Hits =

Jazz Sébastien Bach

Studio album by The Swingle Singers
- Released: 1963
- Recorded: 1963
- Genre: Vocal jazz
- Length: 31:38
- Label: Philips
- Producer: Pierre Fatosme

The Swingle Singers chronology
Jazz Sébastien Bach (1963)	Going Baroque (1964)

alternative cover
- U.S. LP cover

Jazz Sébastien Bach (released as Bach's Greatest Hits in North America) is the debut album released by the Paris-based Swingle Singers. The album was a 1964 Grammy Award winner for "Best Performance by a Chorus" and the group also won the 1964 Grammy Award for "Best New Artist". It peaked at No. 15 on the Billboard Top LPs chart during the week of 11 January 1964.

All tracks from the album are included on the CD reissue / compilation Jazz Sebastian Bach (together with all tracks from 1968's Jazz Sébastien Bach Vol. 2) and on the 11 disk Philips boxed set Swingle Singers.

== Track listing ==
All compositions by J. S. Bach

Side 1:

1. "Fugue in D Minor", Contrapunctus 9 from The Art of the Fugue – 2:14
2. "Prelude for Organ Chorale No. 1" (Choral-Prelude BWV 645 "Wachet auf, ruft uns die Stimme", from the Schübler Chorales) – 2:38
3. "Aria" from Suite No 3 in D – 3:17
4. "Prelude No 12 in F Minor" from The Well-Tempered Clavier, Book II – 2:12
5. "Bourrée II" from The English Suite No 2 – 1:44
6. "Fugue No 2 in C Minor" from The Well-Tempered Clavier, Book I – 1:16
7. "Fugue No 5 in D" from The Well-Tempered Clavier, Book I – 1:38

Side 2:

1. "Prelude No 9 in E" from The Well-Tempered Clavier, Book II – 3:19
2. "Sinfonia" from The Partita No 2 – 4:54
3. "Prelude No 1 in C" from The Well-Tempered Clavier, Book II – 1:56
4. "Canon" (4-Part Canon BWV 1073) – 1:53
5. "Two Part Invention No 1 in C" – 1:22
6. "Fugue No 5 in D" from The Well-Tempered Clavier, Book II – 3:15

== Personnel ==
Vocals:

- Jeanette Baucomont – soprano
- Christiane Legrand – soprano
- Anne Germain – alto
- Claudine Meunier – alto
- Ward Swingle – tenor, arranger
- Claude Germain – tenor
- Jean Cussac – bass
- Jean Claude Briodin – bass

Rhythm section:

- Pierre Michelot – double bass
- Gus Wallez – drums
- Andre Arpino – drums
