= Getting Romantic =

Studio album by The Swingle Singers
- Released: 1965
- Recorded: 1965
- Genre: Vocal jazz
- Length: 28:35
- Label: Philips
- Producer: Pierre Fatosme

The Swingle Singers chronology
Anyone for Mozart? (1965)	Getting Romantic (1965)	Rococo Á Go Go (1966)

alternative cover

Professional ratings
Review scores
Source	Rating
AllMusic	2/5 stars

Getting Romantic (released as Les Romantiques in France) is the fourth album released by The Swingle Singers.

All tracks from this album are also included on the 11 CD Philips boxed set, Swingle Singers.

== Track listing ==
1. "Sonata for violin & piano No. 5 in F major" ("Spring"), Op. 24: Scherzo (Beethoven) – 1:13
2. "Piano Sonata No. 12 in A flat major" ("Funeral March"), Op. 26: Allegro (Beethoven) – 2:35
3. "Etude for piano No. 6 in E flat minor" Op. 10/6, CT. 19 (Chopin) – 3:29
4. "Etude for piano No. 14 in F minor" Op. 25/2, CT. 27 (Chopin) – 1:30
5. "Waltz for piano No. 7 in C sharp minor" Op. 64/2, CT. 213 (Chopin) – 3:15
6. "Album für die Jugend (Album for the Young) for piano", Op. 68: Petit Prelude et Fugue (Schumann) – 2:13
7. "Song Without Words for piano No. 34 in C major" ("Spinnerlied"), Op. 67/4 (Mendelssohn) – 2:03
8. "Pictures at an Exhibition (Kartinki s vïstavski), for piano: Le Marche de Limoges" (Mussorgsky) – 1:26
9. "String Quartet No. 3 in D major" Op.44/1: Andante (Mendelssohn) – 3:31
10. "Zortzico, for piano in B minor" B. 43 (Albéniz) – 2:07
11. "String Quartet No. 13 in A minor" ("Rosamunde"), D. 804 (Op. 29): Andante (Schubert) – 5:13

== Personnel ==
Vocals:

- Jeanette Baucomont – soprano
- Christiane Legrand – soprano
- Alice Herald – alto
- Claudine Meunier – alto
- Ward Swingle – tenor, arranger
- Claude Germain – tenor
- Jean Cussac – bass
- José Germain – bass

Rhythm section:

- Guy Pedersen – double bass
- Daniel Humair – drums
