= Jazz Sebastian Bach =

Compilation album by The Swingle Singers
- Released: 2000
- Recorded: 1963 & 1968
- Genre: Vocal jazz
- Length: 62:45
- Label: Philips

2 CD ("two-fer") re-issue (c. 2000)
- Jazz Sébastien Bach + Jazz Sébastien Bach Vol. 2

Professional ratings
Review scores
Source	Rating
The Northern Echo	4/5 stars

Jazz Sebastian Bach is a compilation album/re-issue of music by the Paris-based Swingle Singers. It combines the tracks from two previous releases:

- Tracks 1–13 from the 1963 album Bach's Greatest Hits, also known as Jazz Sébastien Bach Volume 1.
- Tracks 14–23 from the 1968 album Back to Bach, also known as Jazz Sébastien Bach Volume 2.

== Track listing ==
All compositions by J.S. Bach

1. "Fugue in D Minor" from The Art of the Fugue – 2:14
2. "Prelude for Organ Chorale No 1" – 2:38
3. "Aria" from Suite No 3 in D – 3:17
4. "Prelude No 12 in F Minor" from The Well-Tempered Clavier, Book II (WTC II)" – 2:12
5. "Bourrée II" from The English Suite No 2" – 1:44
6. "Fugue No 2 in C Minor" (WTC I) – 1:16
7. "Fugue No 5 in D" (WTC I) – 1:38
8. "Prelude No 9 in E" (WTC II) – 3:19
9. "Sinfonia" from The Partita No 2 – 4:54
10. "Prelude No 1 in C" (WTC II) – 1:56
11. "Canon" – 1:53
12. "Two Part Invention No 1 in C" – 1:22
13. "Fugue No 5 in D" (WTC II) – 3:15
14. "Vivace" from Concerto for 2 violins, strings & continuo in D minor ("Double"), BWV 1043 – 3:19
15. "Prelude and Fugue, for keyboard No. 10 in E minor" (WTC I), BWV 855 (BC L89) – 3:01
16. "Choral" from Cantata No. 147, "Herz und Mund und Tat und Leben," BWV 147 (BC A174) – 3:28
17. "Gavotte" from Partita for solo violin No. 3 in E major, BWV 1006 – 2:30
18. "Prelude and Fugue, for keyboard No. 1 in C major" (WTC I), BWV 846 (BC L80) – 3:22
19. "Fugue" from Prelude and Fugue, for organ in G major, BWV 541 (BC J22) – 3:19
20. "Adagio" from Sonata for violin & keyboard No. 3 in E major, BWV 1016 – 3:56
21. "Prelude and Fugue, for keyboard No. 3 in C sharp major" (WTC I), BWV 848 (BC L82) – 3:18
22. "Prelude" from "Nun komm der Heiden Heiland" (II), chorale prelude for organ (Achtzehn Choräle No. 8), BWV 659 (BC K82) – 3:30
23. "Fugue" for keyboard No. 21 in B flat major" (WTC I), BWV 866 (BC L100) – 1:24

== Personnel ==
Vocals:

- Jeanette Baucomont – soprano
- Christiane Legrand – soprano
- Claudine Meunier – alto
- Anne Germain – alto (tracks 1 - 13)
- Hélène Devos – alto (tracks 14 - 23)
- Ward Swingle – tenor, arranger
- Claude Germain – tenor (tracks 1 - 13)
- Joseph Noves – tenor (tracks 14 - 23)
- Jean Cussac – bass
- Jean Claude Briodin – bass (tracks 1 - 13)
- Jose Germain – bass (tracks 14 - 23)

Rhythm section:

- Pierre Michelot – double bass (tracks 1 - 13)
- Guy Pedersen – double bass (tracks 14 - 23)
- Gus Wallez or Andre Arpino – drums (tracks 1 - 13)
- Bernard Lubat or Daniel Humair – drums (tracks 14 - 23)
