= Mimi Perrin =

French jazz pianist

Jeannine "Mimi" Perrin (2 February 1926 – 16 November 2010) was a French jazz pianist, singer, and translator.

== Music career ==
Perrin received private musical instruction, including piano as a child and pursued English studies at Sorbonne. In 1949, she contracted tuberculosis and was treated at a sanatorium. She recovered and hit the French jazz scene in the cabarets of Saint-Germain-des-Prés, coming to prominence in jazz clubs as a pianist in her own trio. She met her husband, an amateur guitar and bass player. Between 1956 and 1958, she was a member of Blossom Dearie's vocal group Blue Stars of France, but worked mostly in studios as a background singer to yé-yé singers and bands.

In 1959, she formed the vocal sextet Les Double Six, which included, among others, Louis and Monique Aldebert, Roger Guérin, Christiane Legrand, Ward Swingle, Eddy Louiss and Bernard Lubat. The band name alluded to the fact that the group used overdubbing in the studio to sing twelve-part songs. The group oriented itself to the vocalese of King Pleasure on one side, and Lambert, Hendricks & Ross on the other, and was quite successful in the early 1960s. Les Double Six completed several European tours and also traveled to North America, recording with Quincy Jones, Dizzy Gillespie, and Ray Charles. Perrin was the leader and principal soloist in the group and established herself solo with John Coltrane's song "Naima" "as one of the great jazz singers." From her ensemble eventually emerged the Swingle Singers, led by Ward Swingle after he left the Double Six. A later group, founded in 1966 by Perrin, did not achieve her previous success, and she abandoned music after another bout of tuberculosis.

From 1972 onwards, she worked as a translator of science fiction and fantasy stories by Roger Zelazny, Robert Sheckley, James Blish, and Dean Koontz, among others. In the 1980s and 1990, she translated more mainstream novels (including Alice Walker's The Color Purple and Louise Erdrich's Tracks and Love Medicine) as well as biographies of Nina Simone, Dizzy Gillespie, Quincy Jones and Steven Spielberg. She was also known for her French rendition of the novels by John le Carré since 1989, and later by Ha Jin, with her daughter Isabelle.
