= Sinfonia (1968 Berio album) =

Luciano Berio: Sinfonia

Studio album by Luciano Berio, The Swingle Singers, The New York Philharmonic
- Released: 1969
- Recorded: 1968
- Length: 26:37
- Label: Columbia

The Swingle Singers chronology
American Look (1969)	Sinfonia (1969)	The Joy of Singing (1972)

Alternative cover

Sinfonia is a 1968 Columbia Records recording of Luciano Berio conducting the New York Philharmonic and The Swingle Singers in the premiere of his four-movement "Sinfonia." The composer would later add a fifth movement.

In 1984, the London-based "New Swingle Singers" recorded the same work (with an added fifth movement) with the Orchestre National de France conducted by Pierre Boulez (Erato).

== Track listing ==
Side 1: "Sinfonia (Beginning)"

1. Section I – 6:31
2. Section II – 4:47

Side 2: "Sinfonia (Conclusion)"

1. Section III – 12:21
2. Section IV – 2:58

== Personnel ==
- Luciano Berio – conductor, composer
- The New York Philharmonic
- The Swingle Singers, as introduced:
  - Christiane Legrand – first soprano
  - Jeanette Baucomont - second soprano
  - Claudine Meunier – first contralto
  - Hélène Devos – second contralto
  - Joseph Noves – first tenor
  - Ward Swingle – second tenor
  - José Germain – first bass
  - Jean Cussac – second bass
