= Rags and All that Jazz =

Studio album by Swingle II
- Released: 1975
- Genres: Ragtime, jazz, a cappella
- Label: CBS
- Producers: Ward Swingle & Terry Edwards

Swingle II chronology
| Words and Music (1974) | Rags and All that Jazz (1975) | Lovin' You: Words and Music Vol. 2 (1976) |

Rags and All that Jazz is the third album by the London-based Swingle II singers, released in 1975 on the CBS label. All tracks from this album were also included in the 2009 Sony Classical compilation Swing Sing.

The original Paris-based The Swingle Singers recorded regularly for Philips in the 1960s and early 1970s, and the successor London-based group (Swingle II) continued to record, for Columbia/CBS, Virgin Classics and other labels from 1974 to the present.

== Track listing ==
- All lyrics by Tony Vincent Isaacs

Side 1

1. "Hotshot" (Scott Joplin) - 2:25
2. "The Wanderer (Solace)" (Scott Joplin) - 3:45
3. "Movie Star (Kansas City Stomp)" (F. 'Jelly Roll' Morton) - 2:10
4. "In a Mist" (Leon 'Bix' Beiderbecke) - 4:25
5. "Mr. Superman (Elite Syncopations)" (Scott Joplin) - 2:12

Side 2

1. "Alligator Crawl" (Thomas 'Fats' Waller) - 3:00
2. "Heliotrope Bouquet" (Scott Joplin) - 2:48
3. "Chicago Breakdown" (F. 'Jelly Roll' Morton) - 3:20
4. "Grandpa's Spells" (F. 'Jelly Roll' Morton) - 1:48
5. "Weeping Willow" (Scott Joplin) - 3:48

== Singers ==
- Olive Simpson & Catherine Bott – sopranos
- Carol Hall & Linda Hirst – mezzo-sopranos
- John Potter & Ward Swingle – tenors
- John Lubbock & David Beavan - basses

== Musicians ==
- Patrick Gowers – keyboards
- Allan Walley – bass guitar and double bass
- Tony McVey - drums

== Production ==
- Arrangements and adaptions: Ward Swingle
- Producers: Ward Swingle & Terry Edwards
- Engineer: Steve Taylor
- Album art direction: Roslav Szaybo (CBS Records)
- Album design/montage: Keith Davis
