= Live at the Lighthouse (Modern Jazz Quartet album) =

Live album by Modern Jazz Quartet
- Released: 1967
- Recorded: March 16–17, 1967
- Venue: Lighthouse Club in Hermosa Beach, California
- Genre: Jazz
- Length: 38:03
- Label: Atlantic 1468
- Producer: Nesuhi Ertegun

Modern Jazz Quartet chronology
Place Vendôme (1966)	Live at the Lighthouse (1967)	Under the Jasmin Tree (1968)

Milt Jackson chronology
Born Free (1967)	Live at the Lighthouse (1967)	Under the Jasmin Tree (1968)

Professional ratings
Review scores
Source	Rating
Allmusic	4/5 stars
The Penguin Guide to Jazz Recordings	3/4 stars

Live at the Lighthouse is a live album by American jazz group the Modern Jazz Quartet recorded by Wally Heider at the Lighthouse Café in 1967 and released on the Atlantic label.

== Reception ==
The Allmusic review stated "This fairly obscure LP by the Modern Jazz Quartet, features fresh material and improvisations that are both swinging and creative".

== Track listing ==
1. "The Spiritual" (John Lewis) - 6:00
2. "Baseball" (Lewis) - 4:03
3. "The Shadow of Your Smile" (Johnny Mandel, Paul Francis Webster) - 5:32
4. "Intima" (Miljenko Prohaska) - 4:12
5. "Novamo" (Milt Jackson) - 5:58
6. "For Someone I Love" (Jackson) - 5:02
7. "What's New?" (Bob Haggart) - 6:14

== Personnel ==
- Milt Jackson - vibraphone
- John Lewis - piano
- Percy Heath - bass
- Connie Kay - drums
