= The Modern Jazz Quartet at Music Inn =

At Music Inn

Live album by Modern Jazz Quartet with Jimmy Giuffre
- Released: 1956
- Recorded: August 28, 1956
- Venue: The Music Inn, Lenox, Massachusetts
- Genre: Jazz
- Length: 40:15
- Label: Atlantic 1247
- Producer: Nesuhi Ertegun

Modern Jazz Quartet chronology
Fontessa (1956)	At Music Inn (1956)	The Modern Jazz Quartet (1957)

Milt Jackson chronology
Fontessa (1956)	The Modern Jazz Quartet at Music Inn (1956)	Plenty, Plenty Soul (1957)

Professional ratings
Review scores
Source	Rating
Allmusic	3/5 stars
The Rolling Stone Jazz Record Guide	4/5 stars

The Modern Jazz Quartet at Music Inn is a live album by American jazz group the Modern Jazz Quartet featuring performances recorded at the Music Inn in Lenox, Massachusetts in 1956, with guest artist Jimmy Giuffre appearing on three numbers, and released on the Atlantic label.

== Reception ==
The Allmusic review stated "This is a worthwhile outing".

== Track listing ==
All compositions by John Lewis except as indicated

1. "Oh Bess, Oh Where's My Bess" (George Gershwin) - 4:27
2. "A Fugue for Music Inn" - 4:42
3. "Two Degrees East, Three Degrees West" - 7:04
4. "Serenade" (David Raksin) - 2:55
5. "Fun" (Jimmy Giuffre) - 5:30
6. "Sun Dance" - 4:14
7. "The Man That Got Away" (Harold Arlen, Ira Gershwin) - 3:32
8. "A Morning in Paris" - 2:51
9. "Variation No. 1 on "God Rest Ye Merry, Gentlemen" - 5:00
- Recorded at The Music Inn in Lenox, Massachusetts on August 28, 1956

== Personnel ==
- Milt Jackson – vibraphone
- John Lewis – piano
- Percy Heath – bass
- Connie Kay – drums
- Jimmy Giuffre – clarinet (tracks 2, 4–5)

== See also ==
- The Modern Jazz Quartet at Music Inn Volume 2 (1959)
