= Words & Music (Swingle II album) =

Studio album by Swingle II
- Released: 1974
- Genre: Adult contemporary
- Label: CBS
- Producers: Ward Swingle & Terry Edwards

Swingle II chronology
Madrigals / Love Songs for Madrigals and Madriguys (1974)	Words & Music (1974)	Rags and All that Jazz (1975)

Words & Music is the second album by the London-based Swingle II singers released in 1974 on the CBS label. The original Paris-based The Swingle Singers recorded regularly for Philips in the 1960s and early 1970s, and the successor London-based group Swingle II continued to record, for Columbia/CBS, Virgin Classics, and other record labels from 1974 to the present.

== Track listing ==
Side 1

1. "The Windmills of Your Mind" (Alan and Marilyn Bergman, Michel Legrand) - 2:22
2. "The Way We Were" (A. Bergman, M. Bergman, Marvin Hamlisch) – 2:21
3. "Maple Leaf Rag ('Satchmo')" (Scott Joplin; arr. Tony Vincent Issacs) - 2:35
4. "Amazing Grace" (Traditional; arranged by Ward Swingle) - 4:17
5. ”Killing Me Softly with His Song" (Norman Gimbel, Charles Fox) – 3:35

Side 2

1. "The Entertainer" (Joplin; arr. Isaacs) - 3:36
2. "Try to Remember" (Tom Jones, Harvey Schmidt) - 2:40
3. "The Fool on the Hill" (John Lennon, Paul McCartney) – 2:29
4. "Where Have All the Flowers Gone?" (Pete Seeger) – 2:53
5. "Bridge over Troubled Water" (Paul Simon) – 4:23

== Singers ==
- Mary Beverley & Olive Simpson – sopranos
- Carol Hall & Linda Hirst – contraltos
- John Potter & Ward Swingle – tenors
- John Lubbock & David Beavan - basses

== Musicians ==
- Ward Swingle – keyboards
- Daryl Runswick – bass guitar
- Chris Karan – drums

== Production ==
- Arrangements and adaptions – Ward Swingle
- Producers – Ward Swingle & Terry Edwards
- Recorded at – CBS Studios, London
- Engineer – Bernie O'Gorman
- Album art direction – Roslav Szaybo (CBS Records)
- Album photography – Colin Gibbs & Alan Jones
