= Love Songs for Madrigals and Madriguys =

Madrigals

Studio album by Swingle II
- Released: 1974
- Length: ~30 minutes
- Label: CBS / Columbia

Swingle II chronology
| Madrigals (1974) | Words and Music (1974) |

The Swingle Singers chronology
| Bitter Ending (1972) |

alternative cover / title
- Columbia (U.S.) LP release

Madrigals (released in the US as Love Songs for Madrigals and Madriguys) is the debut recording of the London-based a cappella group Swingle II, who were the immediate successors to the Paris-based Swingle Singers. The members were all new except for Ward Swingle who arranged and adapted the music for the group.

== Personnel ==
Mary Beverly (first soprano)

Olive Simpson (second soprano)

Carol Hall (first alto)

Linda Hirst (second alto)

John Potter (first tenor)

Ward Swingle (second tenor, keyboards)

John Lubbock (baritone)

David Beavan (bass)

Daryl Runswick (electric bass)

Chris Karan (drums)

== Track listing ==
LP side A:

1. "Il est bel et bon" (Pierre Passereau) – 1:19
2. "O Let Me Live for True Love" (Thomas Tomkins) – 2:47
3. "Mein Lieb will mit mir kriegen" (Hans Leo Hassler) – 1:53
4. "The Silver Swan" (Orlando Gibbons) – 2:52
5. "Mas vale trocar" (Juan del Encina) – 1:55
6. "Though Amaryllis Dance" (William Byrd) – 1:49
7. "Cargado de tantos males" (anon.) – 2:23

LP side B:

1. "Revecy venir du printemps" (Claude Le Jeune) – 2:04
2. "Come Again!" (John Dowland) – 1:45
3. "Je ne saurais ni chanter ni rire" (Mathieu Gascongne) – 1:50
4. "Mir ist ein feins brauns Maidelein" (Caspar Othmayr) – 2:34
5. "Bon jour, mon coeur" (Orlande de Lassus) – 2:25
6. "Pues que me tienes, Miguel" (Francisco Ortega) – 1:49
7. "Farewell, Dear Love" (Robert Jones) – 2:25
