= Jazz Dialogue =

Studio album by Modern Jazz Quartet and The All-Star Jazz Band
- Released: 1965
- Recorded: May 27 and June 25, 1965; New York City
- Genre: Jazz
- Length: 33:36
- Label: Atlantic 1449
- Producer: Nesuhi Ertegun

Modern Jazz Quartet chronology
Plays George Gershwin's Porgy and Bess (1965)	Jazz Dialogue (1965)	Blues at Carnegie Hall (1966)

Milt Jackson chronology
Plays George Gershwin's Porgy and Bess (1965)	Jazz Dialogue (1965)	Milt Jackson at the Museum of Modern Art (1965)

Professional ratings
Review scores
Source	Rating
Allmusic	3/5 stars
The Penguin Guide to Jazz Recordings	3/4 stars

Jazz Dialogue is an album by American jazz group the Modern Jazz Quartet with a big band featuring performances recorded in 1965 and released on the Atlantic label.

== Reception ==
The Allmusic review stated "The music, which is highlighted by new versions of such standbys as "Django," "Ralph's New Blues" and "The Golden Striker," is enjoyable enough although this LP does not live up to its potential".

== Track listing ==
All compositions by John Lewis except as indicated

1. "Home" - 2:51
2. "Django" - 6:08
3. "One Never Knows" - 4:15
4. "Animal Dance" - 3:31
5. "Intima" (Miljenko Prohaska) - 5:13
6. "The Golden Striker" - 5:36
7. "Ralph's New Blues" (Milt Jackson) - 6:28

== Personnel ==
The Modern Jazz Quartet

- Milt Jackson - vibraphone
- John Lewis - piano
- Percy Heath - bass
- Connie Kay - drums

The All-Star Jazz Band

- Bernie Glow, Ernie Royal, Clark Terry, Snooky Young - trumpet
- Jimmy Cleveland, Tony Studd, Kai Winding - trombone
- Charlie Mariano, Phil Woods - alto saxophone
- Richie Kamuca, Seldon Powell - tenor saxophone
- Wally Kane - baritone saxophone
- Howard Collins - guitar
- Jimmy Lewis - electric bass (track 1)

Production

- Nesuhi Ertegun – supervision
- Phil Iehle – engineer (recording)
- Tom Dowd – engineer (recording)
- Haig Adishian – cover design
- Adolph Gottlieb – cover painting
- Philip F. Elwood – liner Notes
