= Under the Jasmin Tree =

Studio album by Modern Jazz Quartet
- Released: December 6, 1968 (UK); February 17, 1969 (US)
- Recorded: December 12, 1967
- Genre: Jazz
- Length: 33:35
- Label: Apple; APCOR 4 (UK) / ST 3353 (US)
- Producer: John Lewis

Modern Jazz Quartet chronology
Live at the Lighthouse (1967)	Under the Jasmin Tree (1968)	Space (1969)

Milt Jackson chronology
Live at the Lighthouse (1967)	Under the Jasmin Tree (1968)	Milt Jackson and the Hip String Quartet (1968)

Professional ratings
Review scores
Source	Rating
Allmusic	3/5 stars
DownBeat	5/5 stars
The Penguin Guide to Jazz Recordings	3/4 stars
Tom Hull	B

Under the Jasmin Tree is an album by American jazz group the Modern Jazz Quartet featuring performances recorded in December 1967 and released on the Apple label. The album was the fourth release on the Beatles' new label and the MJQ were the only jazz act to record for Apple.

== Reception ==
The Allmusic review stated: "The program is more or less standard, poised, painstakingly structured, gently swinging MJQ fare, the group's contrapuntal interplay as telepathic as ever".

== Track listing ==
All compositions by John Lewis.

Side one

1. "The Blue Necklace" – 4:52
2. "Three Little Feelings (Part I)" – 3:48
3. "Three Little Feelings (Part II)" – 4:59
4. "Three Little Feelings (Part III)" – 5:18

Side two

5. "Exposure" – 9:17
6. "The Jasmin Tree" – 5:10

== Personnel ==
The Modern Jazz Quartet

- Milt Jackson - vibraphone
- John Lewis - piano
- Percy Heath - double bass
- Connie Kay - drums, finger cymbals, percussion

Production

- John Lewis – producer
- Bob Dawbarn – sleeve notes
- Alan Aldridge – design (cover)
- Ink Studios – design
