= Plenty, Plenty Soul =

Studio album by Milt Jackson
- Released: 1957
- Recorded: January 5 & 7, 1957
- Genre: Jazz
- Length: 41:27
- Label: Atlantic
- Producer: Nesuhi Ertegun

Milt Jackson chronology
The Modern Jazz Quartet at Music Inn (1956)	Plenty, Plenty Soul (1957)	The Modern Jazz Quartet (1957)

Plenty, Plenty Soul is an album by American jazz vibraphonist Milt Jackson featuring performances recorded in 1957 and released on the Atlantic label.

== Reception ==
The Allmusic review by Scott Yanow stated that "these all-star dates still sound fresh and enthusiastic decades later".

Professional ratings
Review scores
Source	Rating
Allmusic	4.5/5 stars

== Track listing ==
All compositions by Milt Jackson, except as indicated

1. "Plenty, Plenty Soul" (Milt Jackson, Quincy Jones) - 9:33
2. "Boogity Boogity" (Jones) - 4:55
3. "Heartstrings" - 4:53
4. "Sermonette" (Cannonball Adderley) - 5:23
5. "The Spirit-Feel" - 4:22
6. "Ignunt Oil" - 5:35
7. "Blues at Twilight" (Jones) - 6:46

- Recorded in New York City on January 5 (tracks 4–7) and January 7 (tracks 1–3), 1957

== Personnel ==
- Milt Jackson – vibes
- Joe Newman – trumpet
- Jimmy Cleveland – trombone (tracks 1–3)
- Cannonball Adderley – alto saxophone (tracks 1–3)
- Frank Foster (tracks 1–3), Lucky Thompson (tracks 4–7) – tenor saxophone
- Sahib Shihab – baritone saxophone (tracks 1–3)
- Horace Silver – piano
- Percy Heath (tracks 1–3), Oscar Pettiford (tracks 4–7) – bass
- Art Blakey (tracks 1–3), Connie Kay (tracks 4–7) – drums
- Quincy Jones – arranger (tracks 1–3)
