= The John Lewis Piano =

Studio album by John Lewis
- Released: 1958
- Recorded: July 30, 1956, February 21 and August 24, 1957; NYC and the Music Inn in Lenox, MA
- Genre: Jazz
- Length: 36:06
- Label: Atlantic; SD 1272
- Producer: Nesuhi Ertegun

John Lewis chronology
Afternoon in Paris (1957)	The John Lewis Piano (1958)	European Windows (1958)

The John Lewis Piano is an album by pianist and composer John Lewis recorded for the Atlantic label.

== Reception ==
Professional ratings
Review scores
Source	Rating
Allmusic	3/5 stars

Allmusic awarded the album 3 stars stating it contains "introverted interpretations" of "thoughtful and introspective selections".

== Track listing ==
All compositions by John Lewis except as indicated

1. "Harlequin" - 5:14
2. "Little Girl Blue" (Richard Rodgers, Lorenz Hart) - 4:30
3. "The Bad and the Beautiful" (David Raksin) - 4:16
4. "D and E" - 4:19
5. "It Never Entered My Mind" (Rodgers, Hart) - 3:36
6. "Warmeland" (Traditional) - 4:41
7. "Two Lyric Pieces: a) Pierrot, b) Colombine" - 10:58

== Personnel ==
- John Lewis - piano
- Barry Galbraith (tracks 3, 5 & 6), Jim Hall (track 7) - guitar
- Percy Heath - bass (tracks 2 & 4)
- Connie Kay - drums (tracks 1, 2 & 4)
