= Milt Jackson at the Museum of Modern Art =

Live album by Milt Jackson
- Released: 1965
- Recorded: August 12, 1965
- Genre: Jazz
- Label: Limelight
- Producer: Luchi De Jesus

Milt Jackson chronology
Jazz Dialogue (1965)	Milt Jackson at the Museum of Modern Art (1965)	For Someone I Love (1966)

Milt Jackson at the Museum of Modern Art is a live album by vibraphonist Milt Jackson recorded in 1965 at the Museum of Modern Art and released on the Limelight label.

== Reception ==
The Allmusic review by Thom Jurek awarded the album 3 stars stating "This date is red hot for any fan who lives for jazz with rhythm, swing, and soul in equal tonnage".

Professional ratings
Review scores
Source	Rating
Allmusic	3/5 stars

== Track listing ==
All compositions by Milt Jackson except as indicated

1. "The Quota" (Jimmy Heath) – 4:32
2. "Novamo" – 5:45
3. "Enigma" (J. J. Johnson) – 3:40
4. "Turquoise" (Cedar Walton) – 5:15
5. "Chyrise" – 3:20
6. "Montelei" – 4:45
7. "Simplicity & Beauty" (James Moody) – 2:44
8. "Flying Saucer" (Moody) – 5:00
9. "Namesake" – 4:12

- Recorded at The Museum of Modern Art in New York City on August 12, 1965

== Personnel ==
- Milt Jackson – vibes
- James Moody – flute, vocals
- Cedar Walton – piano
- Ron Carter – bass
- Otis "Candy" Finch – drums
