= Edward Randell =

British actor and musician

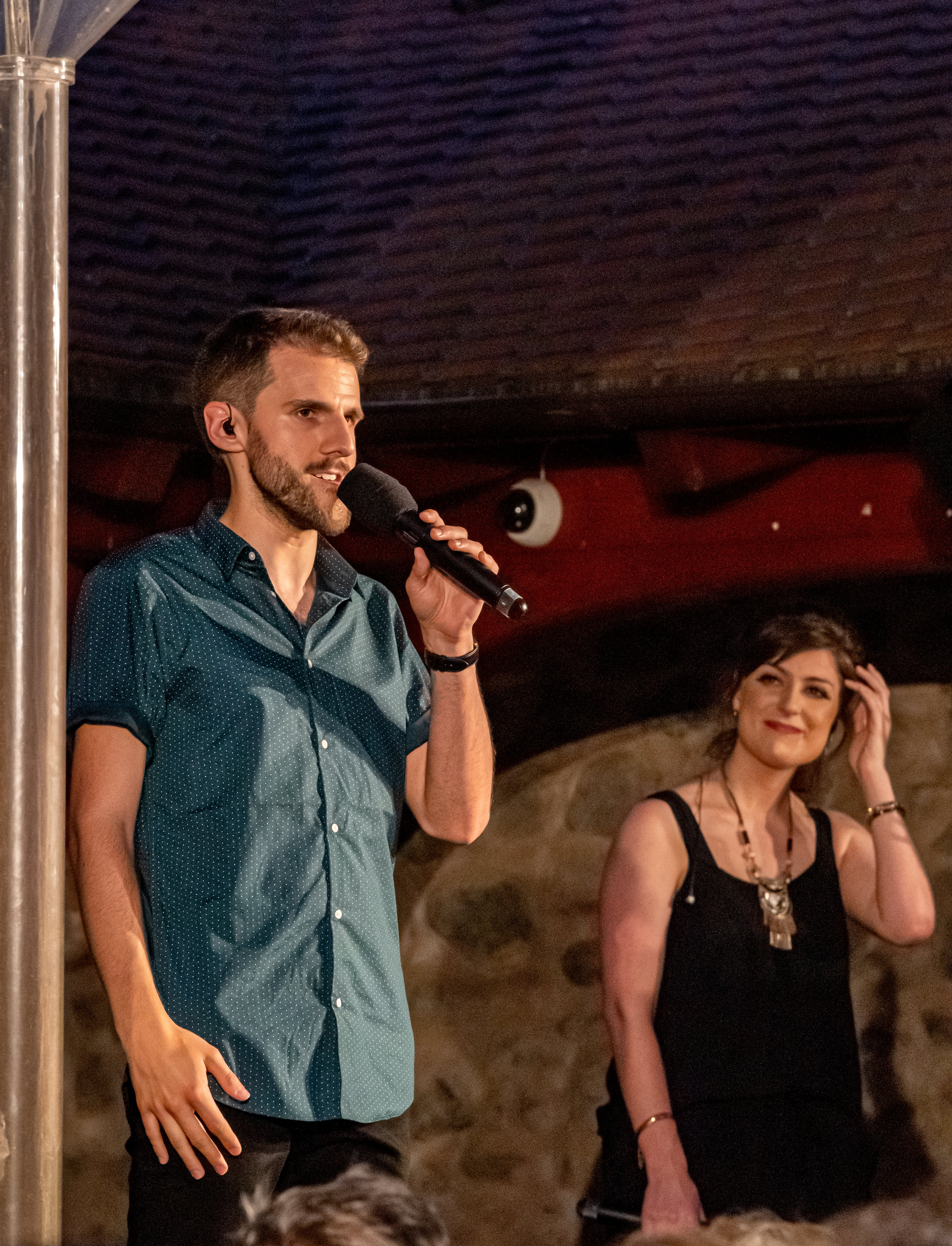
- Edward Randell
- Born: Edward Keith Randell; 2 July 1988 (age 38); Dulwich, Greater London, England
- Occupations: Musician, actor, journalist
- Years active: 2002–present
- Notable work: Harry Potter (film series)
- Website: Edward Randell

Edward Keith Randell (born 2 July 1988) is an English musician and actor, who is perhaps best known for his acting work in the Harry Potter film series and as a bass for the noted international vocal group The Swingle Singers.

He was born in Dulwich, an area of South London, England and was educated at City University London.

His first professional acting role was in the 2002 film adaptation of Harry Potter and the Chamber of Secrets, in which he played wizard and Hogwarts student Justin Finch-Fletchley, a member of Hufflepuff and initially a friend of Harry's. His character is then threatened by a snake, under the presumed influence of Harry (who communicated in Parseltongue), and is later found petrified. Although Randell's character, a member of Dumbledore's Army, features over the course of the book series, Randell himself only appeared in the films once during the series, and the fate of the character in the film series is unknown.

Randell was also a member of the vocal group The Swingles from 2012 to 2022. He is also a freelance journalist, holding a degree in Magazine Journalism from City University London.

== Filmography ==
Year	Title	Role	Notes
2002	Harry Potter and the Chamber of Secrets	Justin Finch-Fletchley	
