= Blues at Carnegie Hall =

Live album by Modern Jazz Quartet
- Released: October 1966
- Recorded: April 27, 1966
- Venue: Carnegie Hall, New York City
- Genre: Jazz
- Length: 42:33
- Label: Atlantic, Philips
- Producer: Nesuhi Ertegun

Modern Jazz Quartet chronology
Jazz Dialogue (1965)	Blues at Carnegie Hall (1966)	Place Vendôme (1966)

Milt Jackson chronology
For Someone I Love (1966)	Blues at Carnegie Hall (1966)	Place Vendôme (1966)

Professional ratings
Review scores
Source	Rating
Allmusic	4/5 stars
The Rolling Stone Jazz Record Guide	4/5 stars

Blues at Carnegie Hall is a live album by American jazz group the Modern Jazz Quartet featuring performances recorded at Carnegie Hall in 1966 at a benefit concert presented by The Manhattan School of Music and released on the Atlantic label.

== Reception ==
The Allmusic review stated "This predictable but consistently swinging set is particularly recommended to fans of vibraphonist Milt Jackson".

== Track listing ==
1. "Pyramid (Blues For Junior)" (Ray Brown) - 7:48
2. "The Cylinder" (Milt Jackson) - 4:56
3. "Really True Blues" (Jackson) - 4:28
4. "Ralph's New Blues" (Jackson) - 5:39
5. "Monterey Mist" (Jackson) - 4:09
6. "Home" (John Lewis) - 3:56
7. "Blues Milanese" (John Lewis) - 6:13
8. "Bags' Groove" (Jackson) - 4:13

== Personnel ==
The Modern Jazz Quartet

- Milt Jackson - vibraphone
- John Lewis - piano
- Percy Heath - bass
- Connie Kay - drums

Production

- Nesuhi Ertegun – superviser
- Joe Atkinson – engineer (recording)
- Phil Iehle – engineer (recording)
- Tom Dowd – engineer (recording)
- Marvin Israel – design (album)
- James Moore – photography (cover)
- Alun Morgan – liner notes
