= Les Double Six =

French vocal jazz group

- Also known as: Double Six of Paris
- Genres: Vocal jazz
- Years active: 1959–1966

Les Double Six (also known as the Double Six of Paris) was a French vocal jazz group established in 1959 by Mimi Perrin. The group established an international reputation in the early 1960s. The name of the group was an allusion to the fact that the sextet used double-tracking techniques to enhance and "fatten" the sound, very much like Brian Wilson of the Beach Boys did in the recording studio. The membership of the group varied from recording to recording. The six members would all sing once to a recording track, then sing the exact duplicate performance again to a second track, "doubling" each individual vocal part.

Singing in French, they performed jazz standards, particularly themes by Quincy Jones and Dizzy Gillespie, adding the poetic or humorous lyrics written by the imaginative Perrin.

Inspired by several American groups, the singers vocalized in the manner of instruments, reconstructing brilliant improvisations of saxophones, trumpets or trombones.

The group was not long-lasting. Because of Perrin's health problems (she had contracted tuberculosis in 1949), Les Double Six dissolved in 1966. They recorded four albums between 1959 and 1964. Many members of the group went on to join the Swingle Singers, which notably reproduced the works of Bach in the jazz vocal style.

The Double Six were nominated for Best Vocal Group Performance at the 1965 Grammy Awards for their LP The Double Six of Paris Sing Ray Charles, but were beaten by The Beatles' "A Hard Day's Night".

== Members ==
(changing according to session, but generally in sextets)

- Mimi Perrin (founder)
- Monique Guérin
- Louis Aldebert
- Ward Swingle (future arranger of the Swingle Singers)
- Jean-Louis Conrozier
- Roger Guérin
- Christiane Legrand
- Claude Germain
- Jacques Denjean
- Jean-Claude Briodin
- Eddy Louiss
- Claudine Barge
- Robert Smart
- Bernard Lubat
- Jef Gilson ( arranger)

== Discography ==
- The Double Six Meet Quincy Jones, Columbia Records (UK), 1960; different piano trios led by Art Simmons
1. "For Lena and Lennie" ("En flânant dans Paris")
2. "French Rat Race" ("La course au rat")
3. "Stockholm Sweetnin'" ("Un coin merveilleux")
4. "Boo's Bloos" ("Au temps des Indiens")
5. "Doodlin'" ("Tout en dodelinant")
6. "Meet Benny Bailey" ("Au bout du fil")
7. "Evening in Paris" ("Il y a fort longtemps")
8. "Count 'em" ("T'as foutu l'camp")

All songs written by Quincy Jones, except "Doodlin'" written by Horace Silver. The US-release on Capitol Records in 1961 was entitled "The Double Six of Paris".

- The Double Six of Paris: Swingin' Singin', Philips Records, 1962 (recorded 1960–1961); accompanied by ensemble
1. "Tickle Toe"
2. "Early Autumn"
3. "Sweets"
4. "Naima"
5. "Westwood Walk"
6. "Night in Tunisia"
7. "A Ballad"
8. "Scrapple from the Apple"
9. "Boplicity"
10. "Moanin'"
11. "Fascinating Rhythm"

The first two albums were reissued together in 1999 on RCA Victor International as Les Double Six with an additional previously unreleased bonus track.

- Dizzy Gillespie and the Double Six of Paris, Philips, 1963; accompanied by ensemble
1. "Emanon"
2. "Anthropology"
3. "Tin Tin Deo"
4. "One Bass Hit"
5. "Two Bass Hit"
6. "Groovin' High"
7. "Ooh-Shoo-Be-Doo-Bee"
8. "Hot House"
9. "Con Alma"
10. "Blue 'n' Boogie"
11. "The Champ"
12. "Ow!"
- The Double Six of Paris Sing Ray Charles, Philips, 1964; accompanied by Jerome Richardson Quartet and Billy Byers
1. "One Mint Julep"
2. "Yes, Indeed"
3. "Georgia on My Mind"
4. "Lonely Avenue"
5. "Sherri"
6. "Let the Good Times Roll By"
7. "Halleluja, I Love Her So"
8. "Hit the Road, Jack"
9. "Ruby"
10. "From the Heart"
11. "Stompin' Room Only"

With Cal Tjader

- Warm Wave (Verve, 1964)
