= Milt Jackson Quintet Live at the Village Gate =

Live album by Milt Jackson Quintet
- Released: 1967
- Recorded: December 9, 1963
- Venue: Village Gate, NYC
- Genre: Jazz
- Length: 53:02
- Label: Riverside; RLP 495
- Producer: Orrin Keepnews

Milt Jackson chronology
Place Vendôme (1966)	Milt Jackson Quintet Live at the Village Gate (1967)	Born Free (1967)

Milt Jackson Quintet Live at the Village Gate is a live album by vibraphonist Milt Jackson featuring Jimmy Heath recorded in 1963 at The Village Gate and released on the Riverside label.

== Reception ==
The Allmusic review by Scott Yanow awarded the album 4 stars stating "Milt Jackson is in typically swinging form".

Professional ratings
Review scores
Source	Rating
Allmusic	4/5 stars
The Penguin Guide to Jazz Recordings	3/4 stars

== Track listing ==
All compositions by Milt Jackson except as indicated

1. "Bags of Blues" - 7:44
2. "Little Girl Blue" (Lorenz Hart, Richard Rodgers) - 4:27
3. "Gemini" (Jimmy Heath) - 9:41
4. "Gerri's Blues" - 7:41
5. "Time After Time" (Sammy Cahn, Jule Styne) - 4:33
6. "Ignunt Oil" - 7:05
7. "Willow Weep for Me" (Ann Ronell) - 4:45 Bonus track on CD reissue
8. "All Members" (Heath) - 7:09 Bonus track on CD reissue

- Recorded The Village Gate in New York City on December 9, 1963

== Personnel ==
- Milt Jackson – vibes
- Jimmy Heath – tenor saxophone – (except 2, 5 and 7)
- Hank Jones – piano
- Bob Cranshaw – bass
- Albert Heath – drums
