= The Modern Jazz Quartet (album) =

Studio album by Modern Jazz Quartet
- Released: 1957
- Recorded: April 5, 1957; New York City
- Genre: Jazz
- Length: 40:11
- Label: Atlantic 1265
- Producer: Nesuhi Ertegun

Modern Jazz Quartet chronology
| The Modern Jazz Quartet at Music Inn (1956) | The Modern Jazz Quartet (1957) | At the Opera House (1957) |

Milt Jackson chronology
| Plenty, Plenty Soul (1957) | The Modern Jazz Quartet (1957) | Bags & Flutes (1957) |

Professional ratings
Review scores
| Source | Rating |
|---|---|
| AllMusic | 3/5 stars |
| The Rolling Stone Jazz Record Guide | 5/5 stars |

The Modern Jazz Quartet is an album by American jazz group the Modern Jazz Quartet featuring performances recorded in 1957 and released on the Atlantic label.

== Reception ==
The Allmusic review stated "Despite the unassuming title, this features a fine rendition of "Night in Tunisia" and a standout "Bags Groove".

== Track listing ==
1. Medley: "They Say It's Wonderful"/"How Deep Is the Ocean"/"I Don't Stand a Ghost of a Chance With You"/"My Old Flame"/"Body and Soul" (Irving Berlin)/(Berlin)/(Victor Young, Ned Washington, Bing Crosby)/(Sam Coslow, Arthur Johnston)/(Frank Eyton, Johnny Green, Edward Heyman, Robert Sour) - 10:12
2. "Between the Devil and the Deep Blue Sea" (Harold Arlen, Ted Koehler) - 6:51
3. "La Ronde: Drums" (John Lewis) - 2:08
4. "Night in Tunisia (Dizzy Gillespie, Frank Paparelli) - 6:08
5. "Yesterdays" (Jerome Kern, Otto Harbach) - 5:08
6. "Bags' Groove" (Milt Jackson) - 5:41
7. "Baden-Baden" (Jackson, Ray Brown) - 4:03

== Personnel ==
- Milt Jackson - vibraphone
- John Lewis - piano
- Percy Heath - bass
- Connie Kay - drums
