= Afternoon in Paris (album) =

Studio album by John Lewis & Sacha Distel
- Released: 1957
- Recorded: December 4 & 7, 1956; Paris, France
- Genre: Jazz
- Length: 43:08
- Label: Atlantic; SD 1267

John Lewis chronology
Grand Encounter (1956)	Afternoon in Paris (1957)	The John Lewis Piano (1957)

Afternoon in Paris is an album by American pianist and composer John Lewis and French guitarist Sacha Distel recorded for the Atlantic label.

== Reception ==
Professional ratings
Review scores
Source	Rating
AllMusic	4/5 stars

AllMusic reviewer Alex Henderson stated that "the part-American, part-French group of improvisers provides an above-average bop album".

== Track listing ==
1. "I Cover the Waterfront" (Johnny Green, Edward Heyman) - 6:51
2. "Dear Old Stockholm" (Traditional) - 6:07
3. "Afternoon in Paris" (John Lewis) - 9:23
4. "All the Things You Are" (Jerome Kern, Oscar Hammerstein II) - 5:16
5. "Bags' Groove" (Milt Jackson) - 6:12
6. "Willow Weep for Me" (Ann Ronell) - 9:31

== Personnel ==
- John Lewis - piano
- Sacha Distel - guitar
- Barney Wilen - tenor saxophone
- Percy Heath (tracks 4–6), Pierre Michelot (tracks 1–3) - bass
- Kenny Clarke (tracks 4–6), Connie Kay (tracks 1–3) - drums
