= The Modern Jazz Quartet at Music Inn Volume 2 =

At Music Inn Volume 2

Live album by Modern Jazz Quartet with Sonny Rollins
- Released: 1959
- Recorded: August 3 & 31, 1958
- Venue: The Music Inn, Lenox, Massachusetts
- Genre: Jazz
- Length: 40:02
- Label: Atlantic 1299
- Producer: Nesuhi Ertegun

Modern Jazz Quartet chronology
Plays No Sun in Venice (1958)	At Music Inn Volume 2 (1959)	Music from Odds Against Tomorrow (1959)

Milt Jackson chronology
Soul Brothers (1958)	At Music Inn Volume 2 (1959)	Bean Bags (1959)

Professional ratings
Review scores
Source	Rating
Allmusic	4.5/5 stars
The Penguin Guide to Jazz Recordings	3/4 stars

The Modern Jazz Quartet at Music Inn Volume 2 is a live album by American jazz group the Modern Jazz Quartet featuring performances recorded at the Music Inn in Lenox, Massachusetts, in 1958, with guest artist Sonny Rollins appearing on two numbers, and released on the Atlantic label.

== Reception ==
The Allmusic review stated "To say that this set works is an understatement. It is a highlight of the group's storied career on Atlantic".

== Track listing ==
All compositions by John Lewis except as indicated

1. "Medley: Stardust/I Can't Get Started/Lover Man" (Hoagy Carmichael, Mitchell Parish/Vernon Duke, Ira Gershwin/Jimmy Davis, Ram Ramirez, James Sherman) - 8:15
2. "Yardbird Suite" (Charlie Parker) - 5:14
3. "Midsömmer" - 7:02
4. "Festival Sketch" - 3:44
5. "Bags' Groove" (Milt Jackson) - 8:38
6. "Night in Tunisia" (Dizzy Gillespie, Frank Paparelli) - 7:03
- Recorded at The Music Inn in Lenox, Massachusetts on August 3 (tracks 1–4) and August 31 (tracks 5 & 6), 1958

== Personnel ==
The Modern Jazz Quartet

- Milt Jackson – vibraphone
- John Lewis – piano
- Percy Heath – bass
- Connie Kay – drums
- Sonny Rollins – tenor saxophone (tracks 5–6)

Production

- Nesuhi Ertegun – recording supervisor
- Tom Dowd – engineer (recording)
- Clemens Kalischer – photography
- Marvin Israel – design (cover)
- Gunther Schuller – liner notes

== See also ==
- The Modern Jazz Quartet at Music Inn (1956)
