= For Someone I Love =

Studio album by Milt Jackson and Big Brass
- Released: 1966
- Recorded: March 18 and August 5, 1963
- Genre: Jazz
- Length: 37:49
- Label: Riverside
- Producer: Orrin Keepnews

Milt Jackson chronology
Milt Jackson at the Museum of Modern Art (1965)	For Someone I Love (1966)	Blues at Carnegie Hall (1966)

For Someone I Love is an album by vibraphonist Milt Jackson featuring big band performances arranged by Melba Liston recorded in 1963 and released on the Riverside label.

== Reception ==
The Allmusic review by Scott Yanow awarded the album 3 stars stating "The well-conceived set is consistently excellent, making this a highly recommended set".

Professional ratings
Review scores
Source	Rating
Allmusic	3/5 stars
The Penguin Guide to Jazz Recordings	3/4 stars

== Track listing ==
All compositions by Milt Jackson except where noted.

1. "Days of Wine and Roses" (Henry Mancini, Johnny Mercer) - 4:25
2. "For Someone I Love (What's Your Story)" - 6:04
3. "(What's Your Story) Morning Glory" (Jack Lawrence, Paul Francis Webster, Mary Lou Williams) - 3:41
4. "Save Your Love for Me" (Buddy Johnson) - 4:21
5. "Extraordinary Blues" - 4:15
6. "Flamingo" (Ted Grouya, Edmund Anderson) - 4:24
7. "Chelsea Bridge" (Billy Strayhorn) - 4:49
8. "Just Waiting" (Melba Liston) - 3:30
9. "Bossa Bags" - 2:52
- Recorded in New York City on March 18, 1963 (tracks 4–6 & 9) and August 5, 1963 (tracks 1–3, 7 & 8)

== Personnel ==
- Milt Jackson – vibes
- Bill Berry (tracks 1–3, 7 & 8), Dave Burns, Thad Jones (tracks 4–6 & 9), Clark Terry, Elmon Wright (tracks 1–3, 7 & 8), Snooky Young – trumpet
- Jimmy Cleveland, Quentin Jackson, Tom McIntosh (tracks 4–6 & 9), John Rains (tracks 4–6 & 9), Willie Ruff (tracks 1–3, 7 & 8) – trombone
- Ray Alonge, Paul Ingraham (tracks 1–3, 7 & 8), Bob Northern (tracks 4–6 & 9), Julius Watkins – French horn
- Major Holley – tuba
- Hank Jones (tracks 4–6 & 9), Jimmy Jones (tracks 1–3, 7 & 8) – piano
- Richard Davis – bass
- Connie Kay (tracks 1–3, 7 & 8), Charlie Persip (tracks 4–6 & 9) – drums
- Melba Liston – arranger, conductor
