= Bags & Flutes =

Studio album by Milt Jackson
- Released: 1957
- Recorded: May 21 and June 10 & 17, 1957
- Genre: Jazz
- Length: 39:12
- Label: Atlantic
- Producer: Nesuhi Ertegun

Milt Jackson chronology
The Modern Jazz Quartet (1957)	Bags & Flutes (1957)	At the Opera House (1957)

Bags & Flutes is an album by American jazz vibraphonist Milt Jackson featuring performances recorded in 1957 and released on the Atlantic label.

== Reception ==
The Allmusic review by Michael G. Nastos stated: "This album is top-notch".

Professional ratings
Review scores
Source	Rating
Allmusic	3/5 stars

== Track listing ==
All compositions by Milt Jackson, except as indicated

1. "Bags' New Groove" - 5:55
2. "Sandy" - 3:56
3. "Midget Rod" - 5:41
4. "I'm Afraid the Masquerade Is Over" (Herb Magidson, Allie Wrubel) - 3:41
5. "Ghana" (Ernie Wilkins) - 5:30
6. "Sweet and Lovely" (Gus Arnheim, Harry Tobias, Jules LeMare) - 4:44
7. "Connie's Blues" - 9:45
  - Recorded in New York City on May 21, 1957 (tracks 1 & 7), June 10, 1957 (tracks 3, 4 & 6) and June 17, 1957 (tracks 2 & 5)

== Personnel ==
- Milt Jackson – vibes
- Bobby Jaspar (tracks 1 & 7), Frank Wess (tracks 2–6) – flute
- Tommy Flanagan (tracks 1 & 7), Hank Jones (tracks 2–6) – piano
- Kenny Burrell – guitar
- Percy Heath – bass
- Art Taylor – drums
