= Born Free (Milt Jackson album) =

Studio album by Milt Jackson
- Released: 1967
- Recorded: December 15, 1966
- Genre: Jazz
- Length: 43:38
- Label: Limelight
- Producer: Luchi De Jesus

Milt Jackson chronology
Milt Jackson Quintet Live at the Village Gate (1967)	Born Free (1967)	Live at the Lighthouse (1967)

Born Free is an album by vibraphonist Milt Jackson recorded in 1966 and released on the Limelight label.

== Reception ==
The Allmusic review by Ken Dryden awarded the album 4 stars stating "This obscure mid-'60s record by Milt Jackson has few surprises, though many jazz fans would be suspicious that the theme from the movie Born Free would turn into a viable jazz vehicle. Jackson's funky treatment of this normally laid-back piece works very well".

Professional ratings
Review scores
Source	Rating
Allmusic	4/5 stars

== Track listing ==
All compositions by Milt Jackson except as indicated

1. "Born Free" (John Barry, Don Black) - 4:05
2. "Bring It Home (To Me)" (Jimmy Heath) - 3:19
3. "Tears of Joy" (Luchi DeJesus, Paul Francis Webster) - 3:31
4. "Whalepool" - 2:25
5. "Some Kinda Waltz" - 3:07
6. "A Time and a Place" (Heath) - 2:37
7. "We Dwell in Our Hearts" (Jack Wohl, Jim Haines, Mitch Leigh) - 3:00
8. "So What" (Miles Davis) - 5:17
9. "The Shadow of Your Smile" (Johnny Mandel, Webster) - 3:59
10. "One Step Down" (Cedar Walton) - 2:48
  - Recorded in New York City on December 15, 1966

== Personnel ==
- Milt Jackson – vibes
- Jimmy Owens – trumpet
- Jimmy Heath – tenor saxophone
- Cedar Walton – piano
- Walter Booker – bass
- Mickey Roker, Otis "Candy" Finch – drums
