= The Modern Jazz Quartet Plays George Gershwin's Porgy and Bess =

Plays George Gershwin's Porgy and Bess

Studio album by Modern Jazz Quartet
- Released: 1965
- Recorded: July 23 & 26, 1964, April 26, 1965
- Venue: RCA Webster Hall, NYC
- Genre: Jazz
- Length: 32:51
- Label: Atlantic 1440
- Producer: Nesuhi Ertegun

Modern Jazz Quartet chronology
Collaboration (1964)	Plays George Gershwin's Porgy and Bess (1965)	Jazz Dialogue (1965)

Milt Jackson chronology
Ray Brown / Milt Jackson (1965)	Plays George Gershwin's Porgy and Bess (1965)	Jazz Dialogue (1965)

The Modern Jazz Quartet Plays George Gershwin's Porgy and Bess is an album by the American jazz group the Modern Jazz Quartet performing the score to George Gershwin's opera Porgy and Bess recorded in 1964-65 and released on the Atlantic label.

== Reception ==
Professional ratings
Review scores
Source	Rating
AllMusic	4.5/5 stars
The Rolling Stone Jazz Record Guide	3/5 stars
Down Beat	3/5 stars

The AllMusic review says, "The Modern Jazz Quartet is alive and well in this effort, thoroughly brewing with overbearing optimism. Lavish in orchestration, shining with dexterity, it is no wonder that it is rare to find such a group that can emulate George Gershwin's work with such spontaneity and prowess".

== Track listing ==
All compositions by George Gershwin

1. "Summertime" - 5:38
2. "Bess, You Is My Woman Now" - 5:37
3. "My Man's Gone Now" - 7:20
4. "I Loves You, Porgy" - 3:21
5. "It Ain't Necessarily So" - 6:23
6. "Oh Bess, O Where's My Bess" - 4:14
7. "There's a Boat Dat's Leavin' Soon for New York" - 4:18

== Personnel ==
- Milt Jackson – vibraphone
- John Lewis – piano
- Percy Heath – double bass
- Connie Kay – drums
