= The Modern Jazz Quartet and the Oscar Peterson Trio at the Opera House =

At the Opera House

Live album by Modern Jazz Quartet & Oscar Peterson Trio
- Released: 1957
- Recorded: October 19, 1957
- Venues: The Opera House, Chicago
- Genre: Jazz
- Length: 37:01
- Label: Verve MGV 8269
- Producer: Norman Granz

Modern Jazz Quartet chronology
The Modern Jazz Quartet (1957)	At the Opera House (1957)	Plays No Sun in Venice (1958)

Milt Jackson chronology
Bags & Flutes (1957)	At the Opera House (1957)	Plays No Sun in Venice (1958)

Oscar Peterson chronology
With Sonny Stitt, Roy Eldridge and Jo Jones at Newport (1957)	At the Opera House (1957)	My Fair Lady (1958)

Professional ratings
Review scores
Source	Rating
Allmusic	4/5 stars

The Modern Jazz Quartet and the Oscar Peterson Trio at the Opera House is a live album by American jazz group the Modern Jazz Quartet and the Oscar Peterson Trio featuring performances recorded in Chicago in 1957 and released as a split album on the Verve label. The tracks by Oscar Peterson were subsequently released on Peterson's 1957 album Oscar Peterson at the Concertgebouw.

== Reception ==
The AllMusic reviewer Scott Yanow stated: "While the MJQ sounds much more introverted than the more exuberant Oscar Peterson Trio, the two popular groups have more similarities than differences".

== Track listing ==
Side One:

1. "D & E Blues" (John Lewis) - 4:08
2. "Now's the Time" (Charlie Parker) - 4:34
3. "'Round About Midnight" (Thelonious Monk) - 3:47

Side Two:

1. "Should I?" (Nacio Herb Brown, Arthur Freed) - 4:28
2. "Big Fat Mama" (Lucky Millinder, Stafford Simon) - 7:24
3. "Indiana" (James F. Hanley, Ballard MacDonald) - 3:55
4. "Joy Spring" (Clifford Brown) - 5:27
5. "Elevation" (Elliot Lawrence, Gerry Mulligan) - 3:18

== Personnel ==
Side One:

- Milt Jackson - vibraphone
- John Lewis - piano
- Percy Heath - bass
- Connie Kay - drums

Side Two

- Oscar Peterson - piano
- Herb Ellis - guitar
- Ray Brown - bass

== See also ==
- Stan Getz and J. J. Johnson at the Opera House (Verve, 1957)
- Ella Fitzgerald, At the Opera House (Verve, 1958)
