= The Modern Jazz Quartet Plays No Sun in Venice =

Plays No Sun in Venice

Soundtrack album by Modern Jazz Quartet
- Released: 1958
- Recorded: April 4, 1957 (track 5 only); New York City; August 24, 1957
- Venue: Music Inn, Lenox, MA (August 1957)
- Genre: Jazz
- Length: 36:27
- Label: Atlantic 1284
- Producer: Nesuhi Ertegun

Modern Jazz Quartet chronology
| At the Opera House (1957) | Plays No Sun in Venice (1958) | At Music Inn Volume 2 (1959) |

Milt Jackson chronology
| At the Opera House (1957) | Plays No Sun in Venice (1958) | Soul Brothers (1958) |

The Modern Jazz Quartet Plays No Sun in Venice (originally titled The Modern Jazz Quartet Plays One Never Knows: Original Film Score for "No Sun in Venice") is a soundtrack album by American jazz group the Modern Jazz Quartet featuring performances recorded in 1957 for Roger Vadim's No Sun in Venice and released on the Atlantic label.

== Reception ==
Professional ratings
Review scores
| Source | Rating |
|---|---|
| Allmusic | 3/5 stars |
| DownBeat | 5/5 stars |

The Allmusic review stated "The music is quite complex and disciplined, making this set of lesser interest to fans who prefer to hear Milt Jackson playing bebop-oriented blues. However the versatile group was perfect for this type of music and these thought-provoking performances reward repeated listenings".

== Track listing ==
All compositions by John Lewis.

1. "The Golden Striker" – 3:39
2. "One Never Knows" – 9:20
3. "The Rose Truc" – 4:55
4. "Cortege" – 7:24
5. "Venice" – 4:26
6. "Three Windows" – 6:43

== Personnel ==
The Modern Jazz Quartet

- Milt Jackson – vibraphone
- John Lewis – piano
- Percy Heath – bass
- Connie Kay – drums

Production

- Nesuhi Ertegun – producer
- Tom Dowd – engineer (recording)
