= Percy Heath =

American jazz bassist (1923–2005)

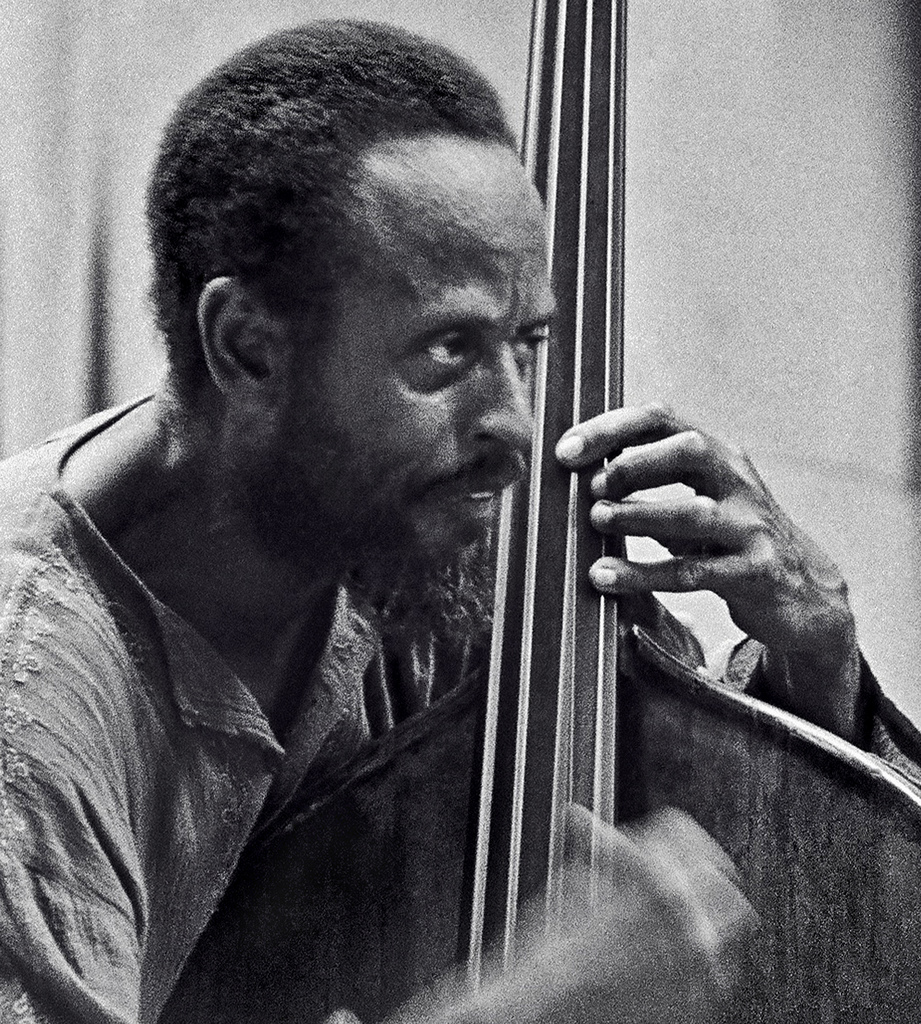
- Heath in New York City, 1977

Background information
- Born: April 30, 1923; Wilmington, North Carolina, U.S.
- Died: April 28, 2005 (aged 81) Southampton, New York, U.S.
- Genres: Jazz; cool jazz
- Occupation: Musician
- Instrument: Double bass
- Years active: 1940s–2003
- Formerly of: The Modern Jazz Quartet; Heath Brothers
- Relatives: Jimmy Heath (brother); Albert Heath (brother)

Percy Heath (April 30, 1923 – April 28, 2005) was an American jazz bassist, brother of saxophonist Jimmy Heath and drummer Albert Heath, with whom he formed the Heath Brothers in 1975. Heath played with the Modern Jazz Quartet throughout their long history and also worked with Miles Davis, Dizzy Gillespie, Charlie Parker, Wes Montgomery, Thelonious Monk and Lee Konitz.

== Biography ==
Heath was born in Wilmington, North Carolina, United States, and spent his childhood in Philadelphia. His father played the clarinet and his mother sang in the church choir. He started playing violin at the age of eight and also sang locally. He was drafted into the Army in 1944, trained with the Tuskegee Airmen, graduating as a 2nd Lieutenant pilot, but saw no combat.

Deciding after the war to go into music, he bought a stand-up bass and enrolled in the Granoff School of Music in Philadelphia. Soon he was playing in the city's jazz clubs with leading artists. In Chicago in 1948, he recorded with his brother on a Milt Jackson album, as members of the Howard McGhee Sextet. After moving to New York in the late 1940s, Percy and Jimmy Heath found work with Dizzy Gillespie's groups. Around this time, Percy was also a member of Joe Morris's band, together with Johnny Griffin.

It transpired that other members of the Gillespie big band, pianist John Lewis, drummer Kenny Clarke, Milt Jackson, and bassist Ray Brown, decided to form a permanent group; they were already becoming known for their interludes during Gillespie band performances that, as AllMusic.com stated, gave the rest of the band much-needed set breaks – that would eventually become known as the Modern Jazz Quartet (MJQ). When Brown left the group to join his wife Ella Fitzgerald's band, Heath joined and the group was officially begun in 1952, with Connie Kay replacing Clarke, who left in January 1955. The MJQ played regularly until it disbanded in 1974; it reformed in 1981 and last recorded in 1993.

In 1975, Percy Heath and his brothers formed the Heath Brothers with pianist Stanley Cowell. Percy would sometimes play the cello instead of the bass in these later performances.

As a sideman, he performed on approximately 300 recording dates in a career of more than 57 years.

In 1989, he received an Honorary Doctorate of Music from Berklee College of Music.

In 2003, at the age of 80, Heath released his first album as a leader through the Daddy Jazz label. The album, entitled A Love Song, garnered rave reviews and served as a fitting coda for his illustrious career. It featured brother Albert Heath on drums, bassist Peter Washington and pianist Jeb Patton.

Percy Heath died, after a second bout with bone cancer, two days short of his 82nd birthday, in Southampton, New York. The month after his death, bassist William Parker recorded the tribute album For Percy Heath.

Heath was an avid striped bass fisherman, and surfcaster, who could be found on many a day, along the surf line of his beloved Montauk Point. He was well respected by the community, and his fellow fishermen. He also relished time away from the stage on his fishing boat, appropriately named "The Fiddler", kept in Montauk as well. On May 27, 2006, a plaque was set into a 5,000lb stone, at Turtle Cove, at Montauk Point, as a memorial. The ceremony was attended by his wife, June, and three sons.

== Discography ==
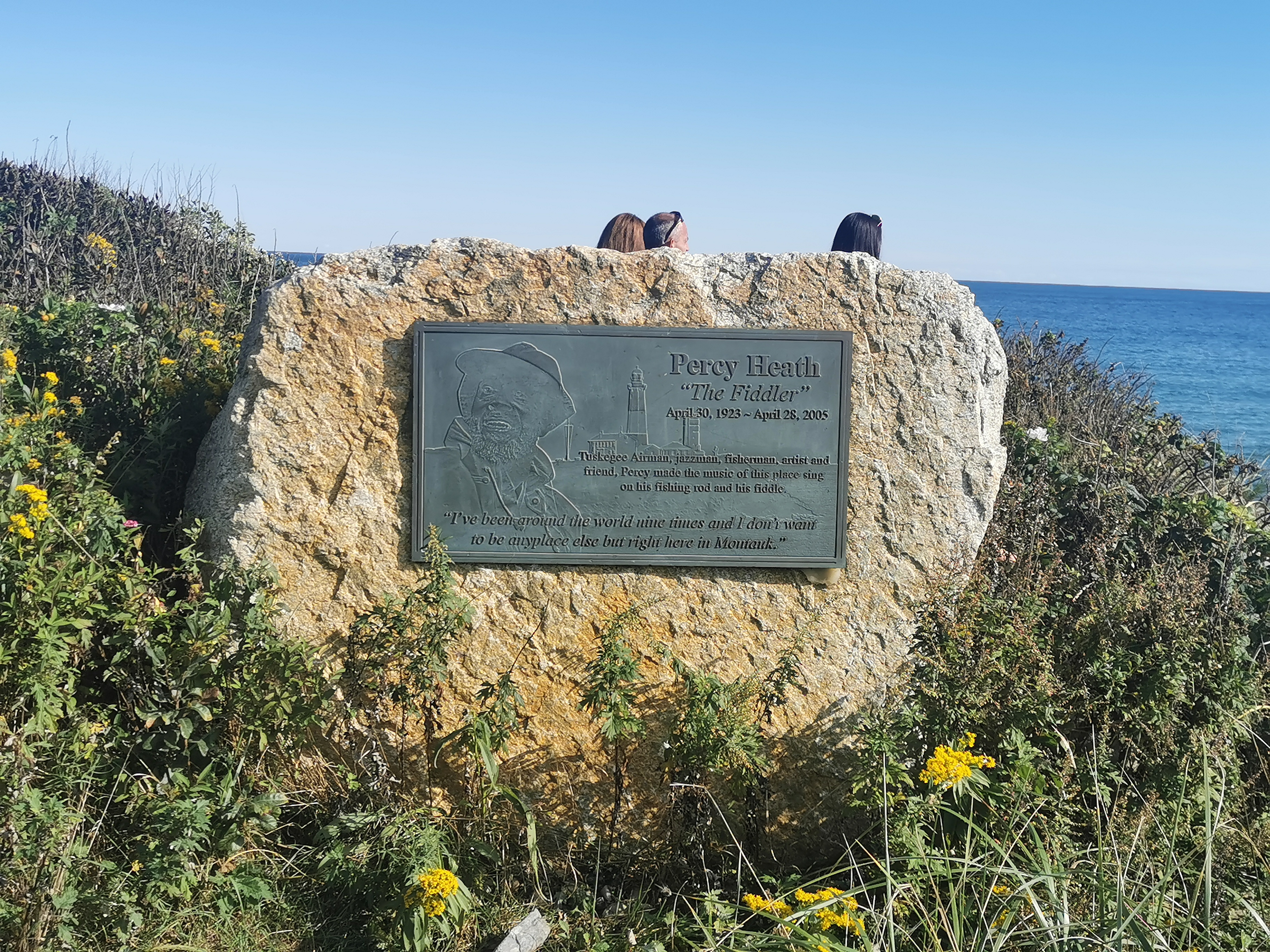
Memorial of Percy Heath in Hamptons

=== As a leader ===
- A Love Song (2003), with Jeb Patton (piano), Peter Washington (bass), Albert "Tootie" Heath (drums)

=== As a member of the Modern Jazz Quartet ===
- Vendome (1952, Prestige 851)
- Modern Jazz Quartet, ii (1954–5, Prestige 170), including "Django" (1954)
- Concorde (1955, Prestige 7005)
- Fontessa (1956, Atlantic 1231), including "Versailles"
- The Modern Jazz Quartet Plays No Sun in Venice (Atlantic, 1957)
- The Modern Jazz Quartet (Atlantic, 1957)
- Third Stream Music (1957, 1959–60, Atlantic. 1345), including "Sketch for Double String Quartet" (1959)
- The Modern Jazz Quartet and the Oscar Peterson Trio at the Opera House (Verve, 1957)
- The Modern Jazz Quartet at Music Inn Volume 2 (Atlantic, 1958)
- Lost Tapes: Germany 1956–1958 (Jazzhaus, 1956–1958 [2013])
- Music from Odds Against Tomorrow (United Artists, 1959)
- Pyramid (Atlantic, 1960)
- European Concert (Atlantic, 1960 [1962])
- Dedicated to Connie (Atlantic, 1960 [1995])
- The Modern Jazz Quartet & Orchestra (Atlantic, 1960)
- The Comedy (1962, Atlantic 1390)
- Lonely Woman (Atlantic, 1962)
- A Quartet is a Quartet is a Quartet (1963, Atlantic 1420)
- Collaboration (Atlantic, 1964), with Laurindo Almeida
- The Modern Jazz Quartet Plays George Gershwin's Porgy and Bess (Atlantic, 1964–65)
- Jazz Dialogue (Atlantic, 1965), with the All-Star Jazz Band
- Concert in Japan '66 (Atlantic [Japan], 1966)
- Blues at Carnegie Hall (Atlantic, 1966)
- Place Vendôme (Philips, 1966), with The Swingle Singers
- Under the Jasmin Tree (Apple, 1968)
- Space (Apple, 1969)
- Plastic Dreams (Atlantic, 1971)
- The Only Recorded Performance of Paul Desmond With The Modern Jazz Quartet (Finesse/Columbia, 1971 [1981]), with Paul Desmond
- The Legendary Profile (Atlantic, 1972)
- In Memoriam (Little David, 1973)
- Blues on Bach (Atlantic, 1973)
- The Last Concert (Atlantic, 1974)
- Reunion at Budokan 1981 (Pablo, 1981)
- Together Again: Live at the Montreux Jazz Festival '82 (Pablo, 1982)
- Echoes (Pablo, 1984)
- Topsy: This One's for Basie (Pablo, 1985)
- Three Windows (Atlantic, 1987)
- For Ellington (East West, 1988)
- MJQ & Friends: A 40th Anniversary Celebration (Atlantic, 1992–93)

=== As sideman (partial list) ===
With Cannonball Adderley

- Know What I Mean with Bill Evans (Riverside, 1961)

With Nat Adderley

- Work Song (Riverside, 1960)

With Paul Bley

- Paul Bley (EmArcy, 1954)

With Clifford Brown

- New Star on the Horizon (Blue Note, 1953)

With Ruth Brown

- Miss Rhythm (Atlantic, 1959)

With Kenny Clarke

- Telefunken Blues (Savoy, 1955)

With Miles Davis

- Miles Davis and Horns (Prestige, 1953)
- Bags' Groove (Prestige, 1954)
- Walkin' (Prestige, 1954)
- Blue Haze (Prestige, 1954)
- Miles Davis Volume 1 (Blue Note, 1955)
- Miles Davis Volume 2 (Blue Note, 1955)
- Quintet/Sextet (Prestige, 1956)
- Miles Davis and the Modern Jazz Giants (Prestige, 1958)
- Miles Davis at Newport 1955–1975: The Bootleg Series Vol. 4 (Columbia Legacy, 2015)

With Paul Desmond

- First Place Again (Wartner Bros., 1959)
- Easy Living (RCA Victor, 1963–65 [1966])

With Art Farmer

- Early Art (New Jazz, 1954)
- The Art Farmer Septet Prestige, 1953–54)
- When Farmer Met Gryce (Prestige, 1954), with Gigi Gryce
- Brass Shout (United Artists, 1959)

With Stan Getz

- Stan Getz Quartets (Prestige, 1949–50 [1955])

With Dizzy Gillespie

- Dee Gee Days: The Savoy Sessions (Savoy, 1951–52 [1976])
- Dizzy and Strings (Norgran, 1954)
- The Bop Session (Sonet, 1975), with Sonny Stitt, John Lewis, Hank Jones and Max Roach

With Benny Golson

- Benny Golson and the Philadelphians (United Artists, 1958)

With Dexter Gordon

- Gotham City (Columbia, 1980 [1981])

With Urbie Green

- Blues and Other Shades of Green (ABC-Paramount, 1955)

With Albert Heath

- Kwanza (The First) (Muse, 1973)

With Jimmy Heath

- Really Big! (Riverside, 1960)
- The Quota (Riverside, 1961)
- Triple Threat (Riverside, 1962)
- Swamp Seed (Riverside, 1963)

With Elmo Hope

- Trio and Quintet (Blue Note, 1953–54)
- Homecoming! (Riverside, 1961)

With Milt Jackson

- Meet Milt Jackson (Savoy, 1954)
- Milt Jackson Quartet (Prestige, 1955)
- Ballads & Blues (Atlantic, 1956)
- Plenty, Plenty Soul (Atlantic, 1957)
- Bags & Flutes (Atlantic, 1957)

With J. J. Johnson

- J Is for Jazz (Columbia, 1956)

With Duke Jordan

- Duke Jordan Trio and Quintet (Signal, 1955)

with Lee Konitz

- Lee Konitz at Storyville (Storyville, 1954)

With John Lewis

- The Modern Jazz Society Presents a Concert of Contemporary Music (Norgran, 1955)
- Grand Encounter (Pacific Jazz, 1956)
- Afternoon in Paris (Atlantic, 1957), with Sacha Distel
- The John Lewis Piano (Atlantic, 1957)

With Howard McGhee

- Howard McGhee and Milt Jackson (Savoy, 1948 [1955]), with Milt Jackson
- The Return of Howard McGhee (Bethlehem, 1955)

With Wes Montgomery

- The Incredible Jazz Guitar of Wes Montgomery (Riverside, 1960)

With Sonny Rollins

- Sonny Rollins at Music Inn (MetroJazz, 1958)

With Michel Sardaby

- Night Cap (Sound Hills, 1970)

With Horace Silver

- Horace Silver Trio & Art Blakey–Sabu (Blue Note, 1953)

With Zoot Sims

- The Brothers (Prestige, 1949)

With Kai Winding

- Jay and Kai (Columbia, 1957)
