= Jean Cussac =

French baritone and music director (1922–2026)

- Born: 31 May 1922; Paris, France
- Died: 25 January 2026 (aged 103) Gujan-Mestras, France
- Genres: Jazz, classical music
- Occupations: Singer, musical director
- Formerly of: The Swingle Singers

Jean Cussac (31 May 1922 – 25 January 2026) was a French baritone and music director.

== Life and career ==
Cussac was born in Paris on 31 May 1922. He studied lyrical singing at the Conservatoire de Paris, and appeared as a baritone both as a soloist and choir member, including in early music and chamber music. He subsequently turned to jazz and joined The Swingle Singers at their creation in 1962, alongside Anne Germain, Jeanette Beaucomont, Christiane Legrand, Jean-Claude Briodin, Claude and José Germain. Together, they recorded many albums and received several awards including the Grammy Award for Best New Artist in 1964 and the Grand Prix du disque of the Académie Charles-Cros.

Also in 1964, he was chosen to be the singing voice of the prince during the redubbing of Snow White and the Seven Dwarfs. After this, he worked regularly with Walt Disney Pictures as a singer. His contributions included One Hundred and One Dalmatians, The Sword in the Stone, Mary Poppins, The Jungle Book and Pinocchio. He also worked as musical director on Dumbo, The Fox and the Hound, The Great Mouse Detective, Lady and the Tramp, which provided an opportunity for him to continue working with his Swingle partners.

As music director, he supervised The Secret of NIMH (1982), Annie and An American Tail (1986) and others.

Cussac also took part in the recording of songs from French films such as The Umbrellas of Cherbourg (1964) and Moi y'en a vouloir des sous (1973) and to albums such as L'Aigle noir by Barbara (1970) and Les Chansons de Sylvain et Sylvette.

He also continued a recording career, including Mozart's Coronation Mass, and Les Malheurs d'Orphée by Darius Milhaud alongside Claudine Collart, Janine Collard, Jacqueline Brumaire, Bernard Demigny and André Vessières. He was also master of music at Les Invalides church in Paris.

Cussac celebrated his 100th birthday in 2022 in a retirement home in Gujan-Mestras. He died there on 25 January 2026, at the age of 103.
