= Christiane Legrand =

French singer (1930–2011)

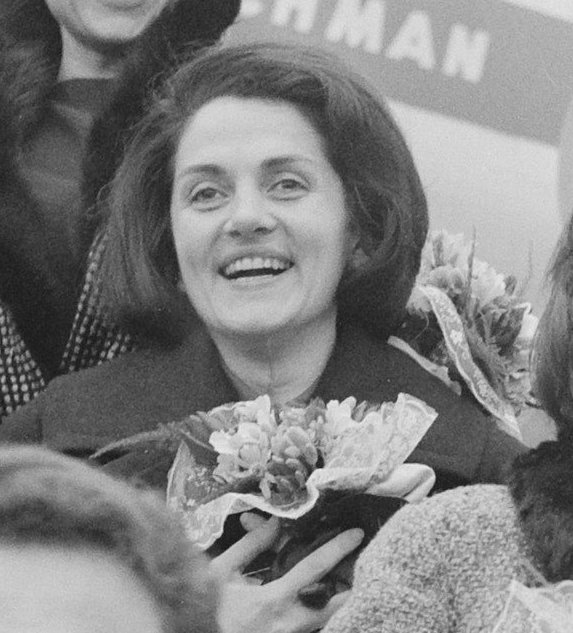

Background information
- Born: 21 August 1930; Aix-les-Bains, Savoie, France
- Died: 1 November 2011 (aged 81) Paris, France
- Occupation: Singer
- Formerly of: Blossom Dearie; The Swingle Singers; Stan Getz

Christiane Legrand (21 August 1930 – 1 November 2011) was a French soprano singer.

== Biography ==
Legrand was born in Aix-les-Bains. Her father Raymond Legrand was a conductor and composer renowned for hits such as Irma la douce, and her mother was Marcelle Ter-Mikaëlian (sister of conductor Jacques Hélian), who married Legrand in 1929. Her maternal grandfather was of Armenian descent and considered a member of the bourgeoisie. Legrand studied piano and classical music from the time she was four. She was taught, amongst others, by the famous classical pianist, Genevieve Joy. Jazz critic and composer André Hodeir discovered her in 1957, and she became the lead singer in the most notable French jazz vocal groups of the 1960s, including Les Double Six.

Legrand was the original lead soprano of The Swingle Singers and was the vocalist who dubbed the part of Madame Emery in Les parapluies de Cherbourg, the music for which was composed by her brother Michel Legrand. She also sang the part of Judith in his Les demoiselles de Rochefort. Her commercial recordings of music for the concert hall included a recording of Laborinthus II of Luciano Berio.

Legrand sang the lead role on the French Disney recording of the score to the film Mary Poppins (1964) and lent her talents to numerous other film projects. Legrand was the featured soprano on the track "Fires (Which Burn Brightly)" on the 1973 Procol Harum album Grand Hotel.

Her niece Victoria Legrand is a member of the American indie pop group Beach House. Another niece, Eugénie Angot, is an equestrian.

== Discography ==
- Elle et ils de Christiane Legrand (Phillips, 1962)
- Jazz Sebastian Bach (Phillips, 1963) (with The Swingle Singers)
- Communications '72 (Verve, 1972) (with Stan Getz)
- Le Brésil de Christiane Legrand (AMI Records, 1972)
- Of Smiles and Tears de Christiane Legrand (Phillips, 1972)
- Nul ne sait de Christiane Legrand (NTI, 1989)
- Chansons d'Amour de Christiane Legrand (Columbia Records, 1994)
