= The Swingles =

British a capella vocal group

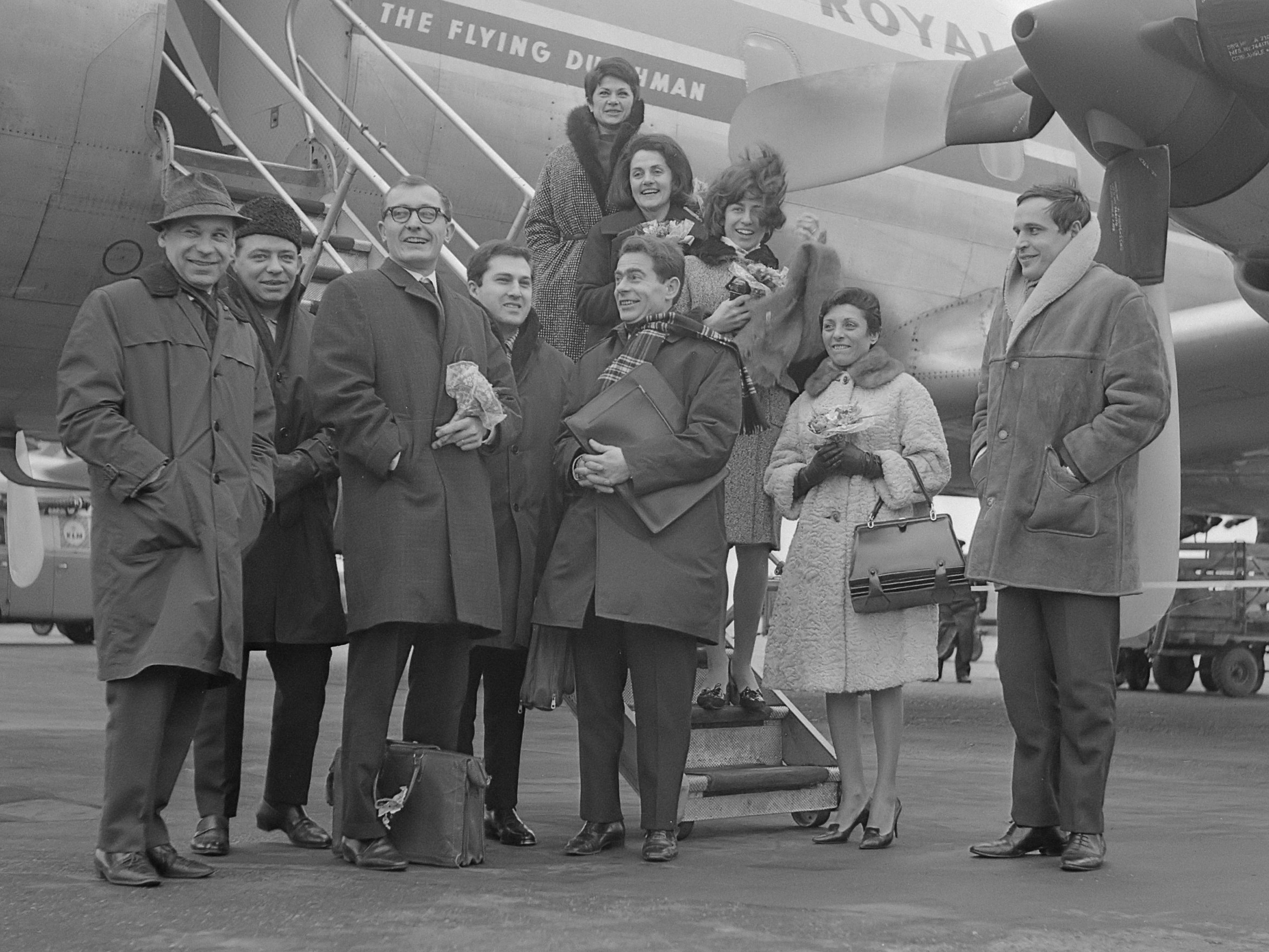
- The original French Swingle Singers in 1964

Background information
- Also known as: The Swingle Singers
- Origin: Paris, France
- Genres: Jazz, classical, vocal pop
- Years active: 1962–present
- Members: Mallika Bhagwat; Sarah Alison; Laura Moisey-Gray; James Botcher; Owen Butcher; Jamie Wright; Tom Hartley
- Past members: See Past members
- Website: theswingles.co.uk

The Swingles are a UK-based a cappella vocal group, originally founded by Ward Swingle in 1962 in France as Les Swingle Singers. In 1973, Swingle disbanded the French ensemble and established a new UK-based iteration, initially known as Swingle II. The group later became known as The New Swingle Singers, and subsequently The Swingle Singers. Since 2014, the group has performed under the name The Swingles.

== History ==
=== French group ===
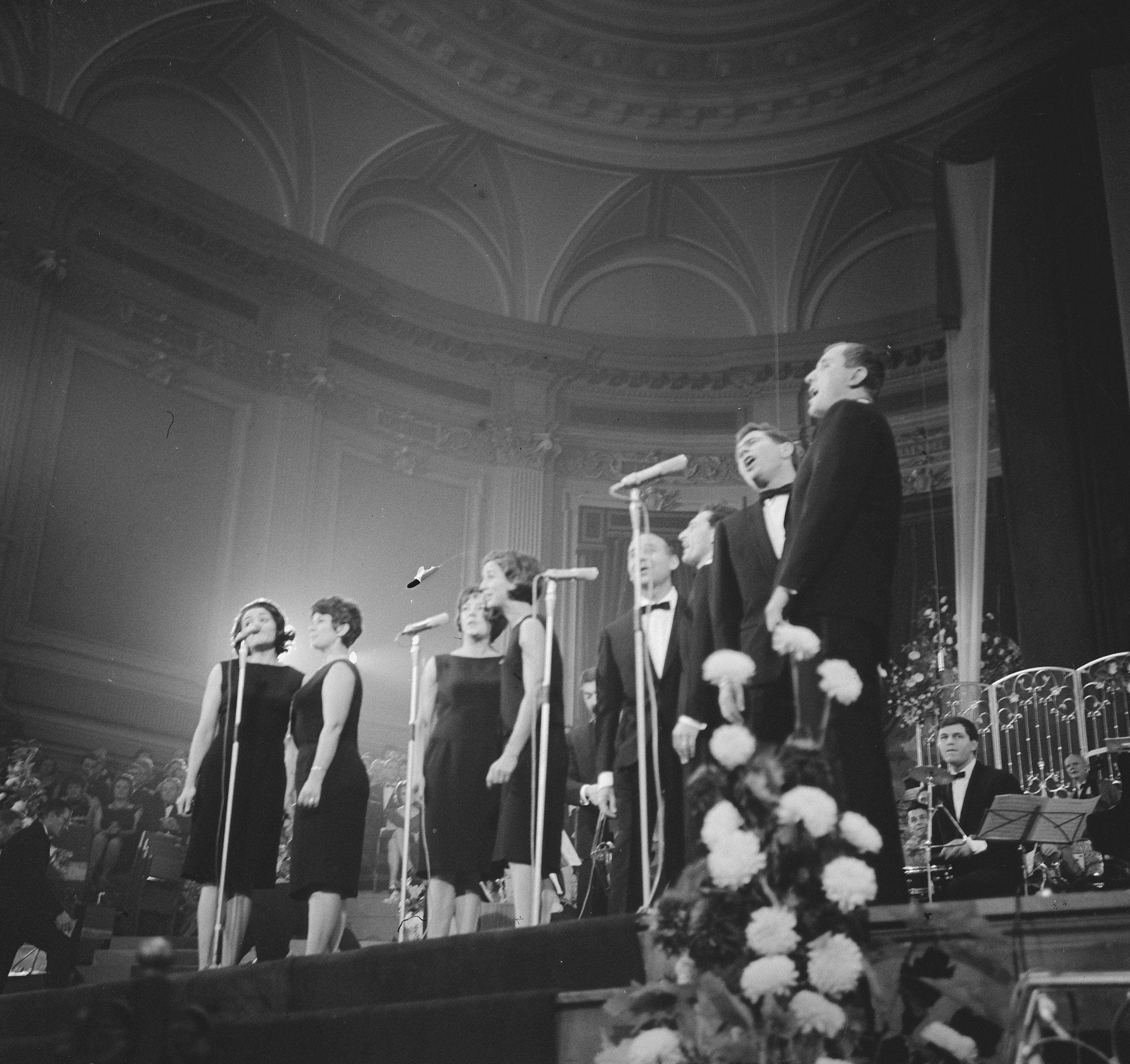
The Swingle Singers at the Grand Gala du Disque in the Concertgebouw, Amsterdam, Netherlands in 1964

The Swingle Singers were formed in Paris in 1962 and directed originally by Ward Swingle (who once belonged to Mimi Perrin's French vocal group Les Double Six). They began as session singers, mainly doing backing vocals for singers such as Charles Aznavour and Edith Piaf. Their original lineup was Anne Germain, Claude Germain, Jeanette Baucomont, Christiane Legrand, Claudine Meunier, Jean-Claude Briodin, and Jean Cussac, with Legrand (sister of Michel Legrand) the original lead soprano. The ensemble sang some jazz vocals for Michel Legrand.

The eight session singers sang through Bach's Well-Tempered Clavier as a sight-reading exercise and found the music to have a natural swing. They recorded their first album Jazz Sébastien Bach as a present for friends and relatives. Many radio stations picked it up and this led to the group recording more albums and winning a total of five Grammy Awards. The French group typically performed and recorded with a double bass and drums as accompaniment.

In 1973, Ward Swingle disbanded the original French group when he and his family moved to England.

=== English group ===
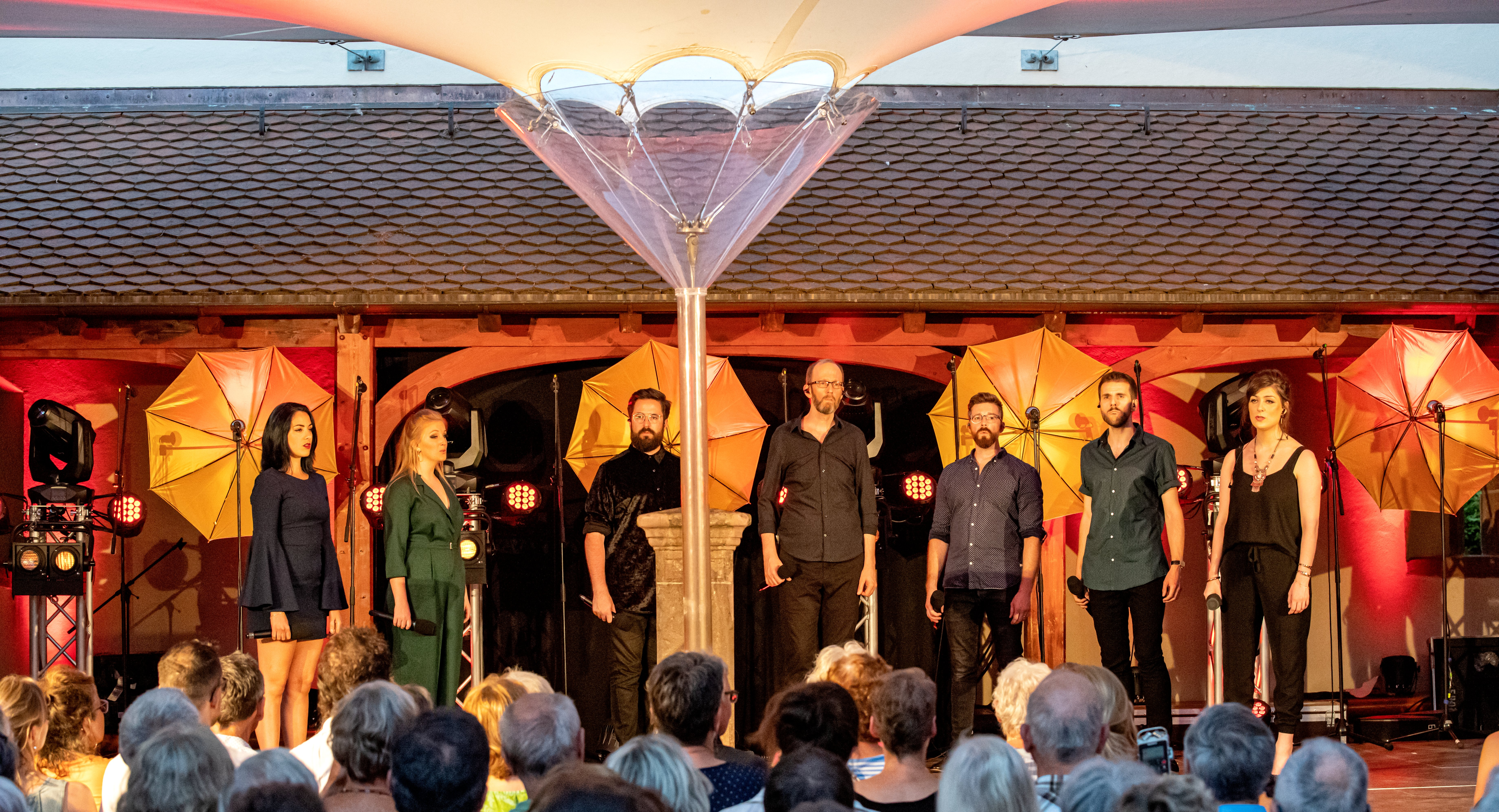
The Swingles at the Black Forest Voices Festival in Kirchzarten, Germany in 2019

In England, Swingle assembled a group of singers with an emphasis moved from classical music to a cappella arrangements of madrigals and then on to other styles. This group debuted Swingle II, and performed and recorded under the name The Swingles, The New Swingle Singers, and The Swingle Singers before settling on The Swingles.

The group has remained continuously active since its formation, with departing members replaced by audition. Ward Swingle continued as a performer in the group until retiring to the United States in 1984 and taking the role of "musical adviser" to the Swingles until his death in 2015.

Until 2011, the group consisted of eight voices: two sopranos, two altos, two tenors and two basses. However, when alto Lucy Bailey left the group in 2011, the Swingles announced the decision not to replace her, but to continue as a seven-person line-up.

The current group performs primarily, but not exclusively, a cappella and over the decades has explored a wide range of styles, from show tunes to rock to avant garde to world folkloric music to straight ahead jazz to classical, including the entire repertoire of the original Swingle Singers. The Swingles are curators of the London A Cappella Festival, based at Kings Place.

As of April 2025, the members are:

- Mallika Bhagwat (soprano, India/UK) (since April 2023)
- Sarah Alison (alto, USA) (as of April 2025)
- Laura Moisey-Gray (alto, UK) (as of April 2025)
- James Botcher (tenor, UK) (since September 2024)
- Owen Butcher (tenor, UK) (since February 2024)
- Jamie Wright (baritone and vocal percussionist, UK) (since January 2020)
- Tom Hartley (bass, UK) (since June 2022)

== Performances and releases ==
An early hit for the group was Bach's "Air on the G String", recorded with the Modern Jazz Quartet; it has been used as the theme tune to a popular Italian TV Show, Superquark, as well as the Swedish Children's program, Beppes godnattstund, hosted by Beppe Wolgers. Luciano Berio wrote his postmodern symphony Sinfonia for eight voices and orchestra in 1968 with the Swingle Singers in mind (appearing on the original premiere recording with the New York Philharmonic). They also premiered Berio's A-Ronne in 1974, which they later recorded. They also recorded Ben Johnston's "Sonnets of Desolation" in 1984.

In 2005, their recording of Bach's Prelude in F Minor was incorporated into the hit single "They", by Jem Griffiths; the piece was also used in the 2006 film The Gigolos. The group's music has a trademark sound and is used frequently on television (The West Wing, Sex and the City, Miami Vice, Glee), in movies (Bach's Fugue in G Minor (BWV 578) in Thank You for Smoking, Mozart's "Horn Concerto No. 4" in Wedding Crashers, Bach's "Prelude No.7 in E flat [The Well Tempered Clavier – Book 2 BWV 876]" in Milk).

The English group sang with French pop star Étienne Daho on his songs "Timide intimité" and "Soudain" from his 1996 album Eden, and with the Style Council on their song "The Story of Someone's Shoe" from the 1988 album Confessions of a Pop Group. They appeared several times on the BBC Television sketch show The Two Ronnies in the early 1970s.

In September 2014, the French blog Dans l'ombre des studios published Swingle Singers' Pavane for a Dead Princess (Maurice Ravel), a previously unreleased 1967 recording.

== Discography ==
- Jazz Sebastien Bach (Philips, 1963)
- Anyone for Mozart? (Philips, 1964)
- Going Baroque (Philips, 1964)
- Les Romantiques (Philips, 1965)
- Place Vendome with the Modern Jazz Quartet (Philips, 1966)
- Rococo a Go Go (Philips, 1966)
- Concerto d'Aranjuez: Sounds of Spain (Philips, 1967)
- J. S. Bach (Philips, 1968)
- Jazz Von Bach Bis Chopin (Philips, 1968)
- Noels Sans Passeport (Philips, 1968)
- Jazz Sebastian Bach Volume 2 (Philips, 1968)
- Sinfonia/Visage with Luciano Berio, The New York Philharmonic, Cathy Berberian (CBS, 1969)
- American Look (Philips, 1969)
- Bitter Ending with Andre Hodeir (Epic, 1972)
- Les 4 Saisons (Philips, 1972)
- The Joy of Singing (Philips, 1972)
- Attention! The Swingle Singers (Fontana, 1973)
- Swinging Bach (Fontana, 1974)
- Jazz Meets Baroque (Fontana, 1976)
- Swingle Bells (Columbia, 1978)
- Swingle Skyliner (Columbia, 1979)
- Folio (MMG, 1980)
- Instrumentals (Polydor, 1986)
- Christmas (Polydor, 1986)
- Sinfonia Eindrucke with Orchestre National De France (Erato, 1986)
- Nothing but Blue Skies (Trax, 1988)
- 1812 (Swingle Singers, 1989)
- The Bach Album (Swingle Singers, 1990)
- A Cappella Amadeus: A Mozart Celebration (Virgin, 1991)
- Around the World/Folk Music/An A Cappella Song Collection (Virgin, 1991)
- Notability (Swingle Singers, 1993)
- Bach Hits Back (Virgin, 1994)
- Pretty Ringtime: English Twentieth Century Songs (Swingle Singers, 1994)
- New World (Swingle Singers, 1995)
- The Story of Christmas (Primarily a Cappella 1998)
- Screen Tested (Swingle Singers, 1998)
- Ticket to Ride (Swingle Singers, 1999)
- Keyboard Classics (Swingle Singers, 2002)
- Mood Swings (Primarily a Cappella 2002)
- Retrospective: The 40th Anniversary Show (Sounds Good 2003)
- Unwrapped (Swingle Singers, 2004)
- Ferris Wheels (Swingle Singers, 2009)
- Weather to Fly (World Village 2013)
- Snapshots, Volume 1 (2020)
- Snapshots, Volume 2 (2021)
- Theatreland (2024)

== Past members ==
In 2025, the past members included:

- Ward Swingle*
- Kym Amps
- Lucy Bailey
- Jacqui Barron
- Federica Basile
- Jeanette Baucomont*
- David Beavan
- Lindsay Benson
- Mary Beverly
- Catherine Bott
- Mike Bradley (drums)
- Sara Brimer
- Jean-Claude Briodin*
- Susan Bickley
- Tom Bullard
- Andrew Busher
- Alan Byers
- Heather Cairncross
- Carol Canning
- Jean Cussac*
- Gavin Cuthberson
- Hélène Devos
- Katelyn Dietz
- Michael Dore
- Deryn Edwards
- Kineret Erez
- Richard Eteson
- Sarah Eyden
- Joanna Forbes L'Estrange
- Kevin Fox
- Anne Germain*
- Claude Germain*
- José Germain
- Joanna Goldsmith-Eteson
- Simon Grant
- Oliver Griffiths
- Carol Hall
- Sharon Hallifay
- Scarlet Halton
- Linda Hirst
- Tobias Hug
- Daniel Humair (drums)*
- Christopher Jay (CJ Neale)
- Lindsay John
- Robert Kearley
- Julie Kench
- Christiane Legrand*
- Alexander L’Estrange (bass viol)*
- John Lubbock
- Helen Massey
- Simon Masterson
- Johanna Marshall
- Claudine Meunier*
- Pierre Michelot (bass viol)*
- Joseph Neves
- Wendy Nieper
- Ben Parry
- Imogen Parry
- Guy Pedersen (bass viol)
- John Potter
- David Porter-Thomas
- Edward Randell
- Jonathan Rathbone
- Michael Robinson
- Jeremy Sadler
- Philip Sheffield
- Olive Simpson
- Jon Smith
- Linda Stevens
- Meinir Thomas
- Nicole Tibbels
- Gus Wallez (drums)*
- Patrick Ardagh Walter
- Rachel Weston
- Clare Wheeler
- Mark Williams

⁎ = Swingle Singers 1962-72 (Only founder Ward Swingle was in both The Swingle Singers and Swingle 2/The Swingles.)
