= Ward Swingle =

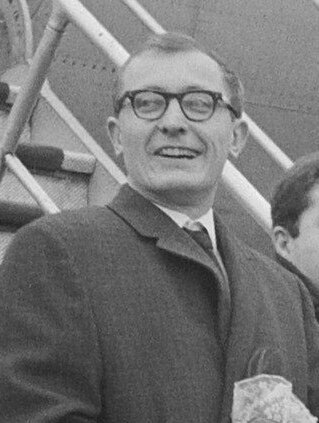
- Swingle at Airport Schipol, Amsterdam, 1964

Background information
- Born: Ward Lamar Swingle; September 21, 1927; Mobile, Alabama, United States
- Died: January 19, 2015 (aged 87) Eastbourne, Sussex, England
- Genres: Jazz, vocal group, classical
- Occupations: Musician, arranger
- Instruments: Vocalist, piano
- Years active: 1951-1990s
- Website: wardswingle.com

Ward Lamar Swingle (September 21, 1927 – January 19, 2015) was an American vocalist and jazz musician who founded The Swingle Singers in France in 1962.

== Life and career ==
Born in Mobile, Alabama, Swingle studied music, particularly jazz, from a very young age. He learned clarinet, oboe and the piano as a child. He played in Mobile-area big bands before finishing high school. Swingle continued his music studies at the Cincinnati Conservatory of Music, from which he graduated summa cum laude in 1950. He also met a French-born violin student, Françoise Demorest, and the couple married in 1952.

Swingle then moved to France in 1951 on a Fulbright scholarship, where he studied piano with Walter Gieseking and also worked as a rehearsal pianist for Les Ballets de Paris. In 1959, he was a founding member of Les Double Six of Paris, which specialised in scat singing of jazz standards. Swingle subsequently applied the scat singing idea to the works of Johann Sebastian Bach. This concept was the foundation for The Swingle Singers, which became fully established by 1962. The Swingle Singers released their albums Jazz Sebastian Bach and Bach's Greatest Hits in 1963. Their early recordings won five Grammy Awards.

Swingle disbanded the original Swingle Singers in 1973. He moved to London and formed an English group, which variously had the names Swingle II and the New Swingle Singers. With the new group, he expanded the earlier group's repertoire to include classical and avant-garde works along with the scat and jazz vocal arrangements.

In 1984, Swingle returned to live in America. Though he remained musical advisor for his London-based group, he devoted most of his time to workshops, guest conducting and the dissemination of his printed arrangements through his publishing company, Swingle Music. His pioneering ideas in new choral techniques produced invitations to conduct the Stockholm and Netherlands Chamber Choirs, the Dale Warland Singers, the Sydney Philharmonia Motet Choir, the BBC Northern Singers and the MENC National Honors Choir at Kennedy Center. In the 2000s he gave a long series of workshops and seminars at universities in both Europe and North America.

In March 1994, Swingle and his wife moved back to France, where he continued his work in arranging, composing and guest conducting. In 1997 he wrote an autobiography and treatise entitled Swingle Singing, in which he defined 'Swingle Singing' techniques with illustrations from his arrangements and compositions.

On February 20, 2004, Swingle was named "Officier de l'Ordre des Arts et des Lettres" (Officer of the Order of Arts and Letters) by the French Minister of Culture and Information.

Swingle died in Eastbourne, England, on 19 January 2015. His widow, their three children, and three grandchildren survived him. Françoise Swingle died in 2017.

== See also ==
- The Swingle Singers discography
