= Max Tschornicki =

German anti-Nazi activist (1903–1945)

Max Tschornicki (9 August 1903 – 20 April 1945) was an activist of the German resistance to Nazism. He and Wilhelm Vogel were the only two inmates who succeeded in escaping the Osthofen concentration camp.

== Life ==
A son of Orthodox Jewish Russian immigrants, Max Tschornicki was born in 1903 in Rüsselsheim. As a student, he belonged to several Jewish youth associations and joined the Independent Social Democratic Party of Germany. Later he became a member of the Social Democratic Party and the Reichsbanner Schwarz-Rot-Gold. After attending high school in Mainz, he studied law and practiced as an attorney in Mainz, defending principally Social Democrats and Reichsbanner members.

Tschornicki was active in the opposition to Nazism. On 24 May 1933 he was arrested on the basis of the Reichstag Fire Decree and imprisoned at Osthofen, one of the first Nazi concentration camps. With the aid of his fiancée and two other inmates, Philipp Wahl and Christoph Weitz, he succeeded in escaping the camp on 3 July 1933. As a result of his escape, security at the camp was significantly tightened, several inmates were severely punished and his family was taken into "protective custody".

He escaped to the Saar, then a League of Nations Mandate, and later to Toulouse and Lyon. After the German occupation of France in 1940 he joined the French Résistance. He was arrested in 1944 and sent to the Auschwitz concentration camp on 11 August 1944. Subsequently, he was moved to other camps. On 20 April 1945, he died of dysentery in Allach-Untermenzing, at a satellite camp of the Dachau concentration camp, nine days before the camp was liberated by Allied forces.

== Biographical works ==
Tschornicki related his experiences as an exile in France to Anna Seghers, who used them in her novel Das siebte Kreuz, written in 1938 and 1939.

The Chawwerusch-Theater in Herxheim adapted Tschornicki's biography as a play in 2013. It adapts texts by Seghers, Stéphane Hessel, Walter Benjamin and Wolf Biermann's translation of the Yiddish workers' song Sol sajn. The play was performed, among other venues, at the memorial site for the Osthofen concentration camp.
