= Transit (2018 film) =

2018 German drama film

- Film poster
- Directed by: Christian Petzold
- Screenplay by: Christian Petzold
- Based on: Transit by Anna Seghers
- Produced by: Antonin Dedet; Florian Koerner von Gustorf
- Starring: Franz Rogowski; Paula Beer
- Cinematography: Hans Fromm
- Edited by: Bettina Böhler
- Music by: Stefan Will
- Production company: Schramm Film
- Distributed by: Piffl Medien
- Release dates: 17 February 2018 (Berlin); 5 April 2018 (Germany)
- Running time: 101 minutes
- Country: Germany
- Languages: German; French
- Box office: US$815,290

Transit is a 2018 German drama film written and directed by Christian Petzold. It is based on Anna Seghers's 1944 novel of the same name and adapted to be set in the present. The film follows a refugee (Franz Rogowski) who impersonates a dead writer in an attempt to flee a fascist state. The film was a critical success and was selected to compete for the Golden Bear in the main competition section at the 68th Berlin International Film Festival.

== Plot ==
Georg, a German political refugee, barely escapes arrest in occupied present-day Paris, France. He attempts to deliver a letter to a famous writer named Franz Weidel but discovers that Weidel has killed himself in a hotel room. He takes Weidel's last manuscript and identity documents, which promise him safe harbor in Mexico. He attempts to flee to Marseille via train with his injured friend, Heinz, but Heinz dies en route. In Marseille, he brings news of Heinz's death to his wife Melissa and son Driss, who live in the city illegally. Georg befriends Driss.

When Georg attempts to turn in Weidel's papers to the Mexican consul, he is mistaken for Weidel and impersonates him, and is given transit visas for himself and Weidel's wife, Marie. He learns that Marie had left Weidel but wishes to reunite with him and has been waiting in Marseille so they can flee together. Driss has an asthma attack, and Georg fetches a doctor, Richard, to care for him. Georg meets the doctor's mistress, who he learns is Marie.

Richard wishes to flee but is consumed by guilt over abandoning Marie. However, when Georg offers her a transit visa, Richard goes ahead and tries to board a departing ship but is forced to give up his spot for French soldiers. Georg and Marie develop a romantic relationship. He comes close to telling her about her husband's death but is unable to do so because she so adamantly believes him to be alive. He learns that Melissa and Driss have fled and witnesses the suicide of a fellow refugee he had known as an acquaintance.

Georg and Marie hail a taxi for the harbor to board their ship, the Montreal, but Georg exits, claiming he has forgotten something. He goes to Richard and sells him his place on the ship. While recounting his story to a bartender, to whom he entrusts Weidel's manuscript, he sees a woman who looks like Marie, but she disappears. He goes to the port to confirm that she has boarded the ship but is told that the Montreal hit a mine off the Balearic Islands and sank with no survivors. He returns to the bar, where he waits for Marie as the French police start sweeping the city to purge it of refugees.

== Cast ==
- Franz Rogowski as Georg
- Paula Beer as Marie Weidel
- Godehard Giese as Richard
- Lilien Batman as Driss, the boy
- Maryam Zaree as Melissa, Driss' mother
- Barbara Auer as Woman with the two dogs
- Matthias Brandt as the barkeeper (and narrator)
- Ronald Kukulies as Heinz
- Antoine Oppenheim as George Binnet
- Sebastian Hülk as Paul
- Emilie de Preissac as the maid at Herr Weidel's place
- Justus von Dohnányi as the conductor refugee
- Alex Brendemühl as the Mexican consul
- Trystan Pütter as the American consul

== Reception ==
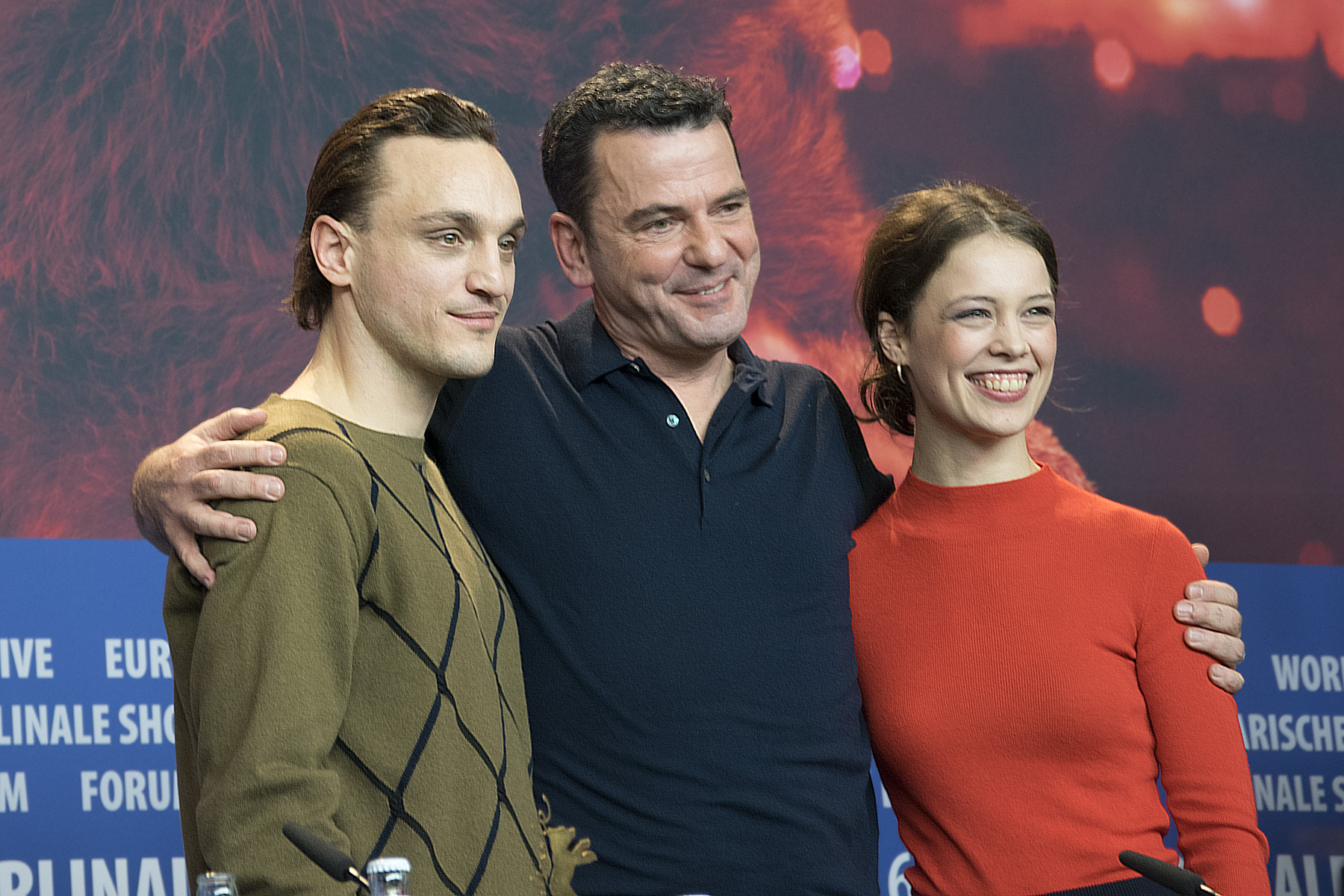
Franz Rogowski, Christian Petzold and Paula Beer at the press conference for Transit at Berlinale 2018

On the review aggregator website Rotten Tomatoes, 95% of 182 critics' reviews are positive, with an average rating of 7.6/10. The consensus reads "Transit lives up to its title with a challenging drama that captures characters - and puts the audience - in a state of flux and exerts an unsettling pull."
