= Easy Living (Paul Desmond album) =

Studio album by Paul Desmond
- Released: 1966
- Recorded: June 5, 14 & 25, 1963, July 14 and September 9, 1964 and June 1, 1965; New York City
- Genre: Jazz
- Length: 67:13
- Label: RCA Victor LPM 3320
- Producer: George Avakian

Paul Desmond chronology
Glad to Be Unhappy (1964)	Easy Living (1966)	Summertime (1968)

Easy Living is an album recorded by American jazz saxophonist Paul Desmond featuring performances recorded between 1963 and 1965 which were released on the RCA Victor label.

== Reception ==
Professional ratings
Review scores
Source	Rating
Allmusic	4.5/5 stars
The Penguin Guide to Jazz Recordings	4/4 stars
Q Magazine	4/5 stars

Allmusic awarded the album 4½ stars stating "As the Paul Desmond/Jim Hall quartet's recording activities gradually came to a halt by 1965, RCA Victor assembled the remains of a number of their later sessions into one last album. These are anything but leftovers, however -- indeed, they constitute the best Desmond/Hall album since Take Ten, more varied in texture and mood, and by and large more inspired in solo content, than Bossa Antigua and Glad to Be Unhappy". Q Magazine called it "Desmond's finest hour" when it was reissued in 1990.

== Track listing ==
All compositions by Paul Desmond except where noted.

1. "When Joanna Loved Me" (Robert Wells, Jack Segal) - 5:48
2. "That Old Feeling" (Sammy Fain, Lew Brown) - 5:49
3. "Polka Dots and Moonbeams" (Jimmy Van Heusen, Johnny Burke) - 5:51
4. "Here's That Rainy Day" (Van Heusen, Burke) - 5:43
5. "Easy Living" (Ralph Rainger, Leo Robin) - 7:08
6. "I've Grown Accustomed to Her Face" (Frederick Loewe, Alan Jay Lerner) - 4:19
7. "Bewitched, Bothered and Bewildered" (Richard Rodgers, Lorenz Hart) - 6:25
8. "Blues for Fun" (Paul Desmond) - 6:28
9. "Rude Old Man" (Eugene Wright) - 5:42 Bonus track on CD reissue
10. "Polka Dots and Moonbeams" [alternate take] (Van Huesen, Burke) - 6:13 Bonus track on CD reissue
11. "Bewitched, Bothered and Bewildered" [alternate take] (Rodgers, Hart) - 7:47 Bonus track on CD reissue

Note

- Recorded Webster Hall on June 5, 1963 (track 3), June 14, 1963 (track 8), June 25, 1963 (track 2) and at RCA Studio A in New York City on July 13, 1964 (track 9), July 14, 1964 (tracks 1 & 10), September 9, 1964 (track 5), September 16, 1964 (track 11) and June 1, 1965 (tracks 4, 6 & 7) .

== Personnel ==
- Paul Desmond - alto saxophone
- Jim Hall - guitar
- Gene Cherico (tracks 3 & 8), Percy Heath (tracks 4, 6 & 7), Eugene Wright (tracks 1, 2, 5 & 9–11) - bass
- Connie Kay - drums
