= Glad to Be Unhappy (album) =

Studio album by Paul Desmond
- Released: 1965
- Recorded: June 10, 1963, July 13 & 14, 1964, August 20, 1964 and September 4, 8 & 16, 1964; Webster Hall and RCA Studio A, New York City
- Genre: Jazz
- Length: 56:51
- Label: RCA Victor LPM 3407
- Producer: George Avakian

Paul Desmond chronology
Bossa Antigua (1965)	Glad to Be Unhappy (1965)	Easy Living (1965)

Glad to Be Unhappy is an album recorded by American jazz saxophonist Paul Desmond featuring performances recorded in 1964 (with one track from 1963) which were released on the RCA Victor label.

== Reception ==
Professional ratings
Review scores
Source	Rating
Allmusic	4/5 stars
The Penguin Guide to Jazz Recordings	3.5/4 stars
DownBeat	3.5/5 stars

Allmusic awarded the album 4 stars, stating, "At first glance, Desmond may seem only peripherally involved with the music-making, keeping emotion at a cool, intellectual arms' length, yet his exceptionally pure tone and ruminative moods wear very well over the long haul. ...A lovely recording, though not the best album in the Desmond/Hall collaboration".

== Track listing ==
1. "Glad to Be Unhappy" (Richard Rodgers, Lorenz Hart) - 5:47
2. "Poor Butterfly" (Raymond Hubbell, John Golden) - 7:20
3. "Stranger in Town" (Mel Tormé) - 6:27
4. "A Taste of Honey" (Ric Marlow, Bobby Scott) - 4:29
5. "Any Other Time" (Paul Desmond) - 5:26
6. "Hi-Lili, Hi-Lo" (Bronisław Kaper, Helen Deutsch) - 4:43
7. "Angel Eyes" (Matt Dennis, Earl Brent) - 6:22
8. "By the River Sainte Marie" (Harry Warren, Edgar Leslie) - 6:17 Bonus track on CD reissue
9. "All Across the City" (Jim Hall) - 4:34 Bonus track on CD reissue
10. "All Through the Night" (Cole Porter) - 5:26 Bonus track on CD reissue
- Recorded at Webster Hall in New York City on June 10, 1963 (track 2) and at RCA Studio A in New York City on July 13, 1964 (track 7), July 14, 1964 (track 4), August 20, 1964 (track 5), September 4, 1964 (tracks 3 & 8), September 8, 1964 (tracks 1 & 6) and September 16, 1964 (tracks 9 & 10).

== Personnel ==
- Paul Desmond - alto saxophone
- Jim Hall - guitar
- Gene Cherico (track 2), Eugene Wright (tracks 1 & 3–10) - bass
- Connie Kay - drums
