= Take Ten =

Studio album by Paul Desmond
- Released: 1963
- Recorded: June 5, 10, 12, 14 & 25, 1963
- Venues: Webster Hall, New York City
- Genre: Jazz
- Length: 37:25
- Label: RCA Victor LPM 2569
- Producer: George Avakian

Paul Desmond chronology
Two of a Mind (1962)	Take Ten (1963)	Bossa Antigua (1964)

Take Ten is an album recorded by American jazz saxophonist Paul Desmond featuring performances recorded in 1963 which were released on the RCA Victor label with cover art by Andy Warhol.

== Background ==
Take Ten was the first small-group jazz album Desmond released as a solo artist under a contract with RCA records. His initial RCA releases were an album featuring him alongside a string orchestra (1961's Desmond Blue), and a small-group session co-lead with Gerry Mulligan (1962's Two of a Mind). With Take Ten, Desmond continued a partnership with guitarist Jim Hall that had begun with the 1959 quartet album First Place Again for Warner Bros. records. In the time between the earlier quartet record with Hall and Take Ten, Desmond (as part of The Dave Brubeck Quartet) had a huge popular hit in 1961 with his composition "Take Five". "Take Five" was recorded in 1959 for the Brubeck Quartet's Time Out album, but only became a hit after the 1961 single release. Take Ten's title track was a 5/4 jazz composition similar to "Take Five" in terms of rhythm, chord structure, and melody. The Take Ten album also reflected the popularity of another early-1960s Billboard Hot 100 U.S. jazz hit, 1962's "Desafinado" recording by jazz saxophonist Stan Getz. "Desafinado" marked the beginning of the bossa nova craze in North America. The Dave Brubeck Quartet (featuring Desmond) recorded Bossa Nova U.S.A. in the fall of 1962, following the popularity of "Desafinado". Take Ten was Desmond's first solo album to incorporate bossa nova. Desmond continued to explore bossa nova in his next album, 1964's Bossa Antigua.

== Chart performance ==
The album debuted on Billboard magazine's Top LP's chart in the issue dated December 28, 1963, peaking at No. 129 during a three-week run on the chart.

== Reception ==
Professional ratings
Review scores
Source	Rating
Allmusic	4.5/5 stars
The Penguin Guide to Jazz Recordings	3/4 stars

Allmusic awarded the album 4½ stars stating "There is not a single track here that isn't loaded with ingeniously worked out, always melodic ideas".

== Track listing ==
All compositions by Paul Desmond except where noted.

1. "Take Ten" – 3:11
2. "El Prince" – 3:38
3. "Alone Together" (Arthur Schwartz, Howard Dietz) – 6:52
4. "Embarcadero" – 4:07
5. "Theme from "Black Orpheus"" (Luiz Bonfá, Antônio Maria) – 4:14
6. "Nancy (with the Laughing Face)" (Jimmy Van Heusen, Phil Silvers) – 6:05
7. "Samba de Orfeu" (Bonfá, Maria) – 4:29
8. "The One I Love (Belongs to Somebody Else)" (Isham Jones, Gus Kahn) – 5:37

CD 2000 reissue only:

9. "Out of Nowhere" – 6:54
10. "Embarcadero" (Alternate Take) – 4:53
11. "El Prince" (Alternate Take) – 5:35

Note

- Recorded at Webster Hall in New York City on June 5, 1963 (track 8), June 10, 1963 (tracks 5 & 7). June 12, 1963 (tracks 2 & 3), June 14, 1963 (tracks 4 & 6) and June 25, 1963 (track 1).

== Personnel ==
- Paul Desmond – alto saxophone
- Jim Hall – guitar
- Gene Cherico (tracks 2–8, 10, 11), Eugene Wright (track 1), George Duvivier (track 9) – bass
- Connie Kay – drums

== Charts ==
Chart (1964)	Peak position
US Billboard Top LPs	129
