= Bridge over Troubled Water (Paul Desmond album) =

Studio album by Paul Desmond
- Released: October 1970
- Recorded: 1969
- Studio: Van Gelder Studio, Englewood Cliffs, NJ
- Genre: Jazz
- Length: 36:21
- Label: A&M SP 3032; Verve reissue
- Producer: Don Sebesky

Paul Desmond chronology
From the Hot Afternoon (1969)	Bridge over Troubled Water (1970)	We're All Together Again for the First Time (1972)

Bridge over Troubled Water is a 1970 studio album by Paul Desmond. It consists of songs recorded by Simon & Garfunkel and arranged by Don Sebesky.

== Reception ==
Professional ratings
Review scores
Source	Rating
AllMusic	3.5/5 stars

Richard S. Ginell of AllMusic said that "Against the odds as determined by bopsters, Desmond finds something beautiful, wistful, and/or sly to say in each of these ten tunes, backed by Herbie Hancock's Rhodes electric piano and a set of ravishing, occasionally overstated (as in "America") orchestrations by Don Sebesky".

== Track listing ==
All songs written by Paul Simon, except "Scarborough Fair/Canticle", a traditional ballad, arranged by Simon and Art Garfunkel.

1. "El Condor Pasa" – 3:05
2. "So Long, Frank Lloyd Wright" – 3:27
3. "The 59th Street Bridge Song (Feelin' Groovy)" – 5:11
4. "Mrs. Robinson" – 2:42
5. "Old Friends" – 3:54
6. "America" – 3:58
7. "For Emily, Whenever I May Find Her" – 4:03
8. "Scarborough Fair/Canticle" – 4:23
9. "Cecilia" – 2:14
10. "Bridge over Troubled Water" – 3:24

== Personnel ==
- Paul Desmond – alto saxophone
- Herbie Hancock – electric piano
- Ron Carter – double bass
- Jerry Jemmott – Fender bass
- Airto Moreira, Bill Lavorgna, João Palma – drums
- Gene Bertoncini, Sam Brown – guitar
- Don Sebesky – arranger
