= Margot Bettauer Dembo =

German-born American translator (1928–2019)

Margot Bettauer Dembo (10 January 1928 – 10 July 2019) was a German-born American translator of fiction and non-fiction. She translated writing from German to English, and is known for her translations of works by Judith Hermann, Robert Gernhardt, Joachim Fest, Ödön von Horvath, Feridun Zaimoglu, and Hermann Kant. Her work won the Helen and Kurt Wolff Translator's Prize and the Goethe-Institut/Berlin Translator's Prize. She translated multiple non-fiction memoirs and historical accounts of World War II, as well as several works of fiction.

== Career ==
Dembo worked as a freelance editor and translator of works from German to English. Her editorial work included editing publications for W.W. Norton and the American Museum of Natural History.

As a translator, Dembo initially focused on works written in and about World War II, in German, especially non-fiction works and memoirs of the Holocaust. These included Jost Hermand's A Hitler Youth in Poland (1998), Ruth Elias' memoir, A Triumph of Hope: From Theresienstadt and Auschwitz to Israel (1999), Solomon Perel's Europa, Europa (1997) and Hans-Joachim Maaz's Behind the Wall – The Inner Life of Communist Germany (1995). She has translated books by Joachim Fest, Zsuzsa Bank, Kristina Dunker, Vicky Baum, Olaf G. Klein, and Anna Seghers. She also translated the scripts for two documentary films, The Restless Conscience: Resistance to Hitler Within Germany 1933-1945, which was nominated for an Academy Award in 1992, and The Burning Wall. Shorter translations by Dembo appeared in Granta and No Man's Land.

Dembo translated writer Judith Hermann's debut book of stories, Sommerhaus, Später, work that won her the Helen and Kurt Wolff Translator's Prize in 2003.

== Biography ==
Dembo was born in Mannheim, Germany on 10 January 1928. Her family emigrated to the United States of America, and she lived in Toms River, in New Jersey, later moving to Ancramdale in New York state. She died on 10 July 2019, in New York.

== Awards and honors ==
- 2003 Helen and Kurt Wolff Translator's Prize for translating to English Judith Hermann's Summerhouse, later (Sommerhaus, Später)
- 1994 Goethe-Institut/Berlin Translator's Prize

== Bibliography ==
Translations from German to English:

- (1998) Ruth Elias, Triumph of Hope: From Theresienstadt and Auschwitz to Israel (John Wiley and Sons) ISBN 9-780-47116-3657
- (1999) Olaf G. Klein, Aftertime (Northwestern University) ISBN 0-810-11504-2
- (2002) Judith Hermann, Summerhouse, Later (Ecco) ISBN 0-060-00686-2
- (2003) Roma Ligocka and Iris Von Finckenstein, The Girl in the Red Coat (Penguin) ISBN 9-780-38533-7403
- (2004) Joachim Fest, Inside Hitler's Bunker:The Last Days of the Third Reich (Farrar, Straus and Giroux) ISBN 0-374-13577-0
- (2005) Zsuzsa Bank, The Swimmer (Harcourt) ISBN 0-151-00932-5
- (2013) Anna Seghers, Transit (New York Review of Books) ISBN 9-781-59017-6252
- (2018) Anna Seghers, The Seventh Cross (New York Review of Books) ISBN 9-781-68137-2129
- (2021) Anna Seghers, The Dead Girls' Class Trip (New York Review of Books) ISBN 9-781-68137-5359
