= Osthofen concentration camp =

Nazi concentration camp

Osthofen
- Nazi concentration camp
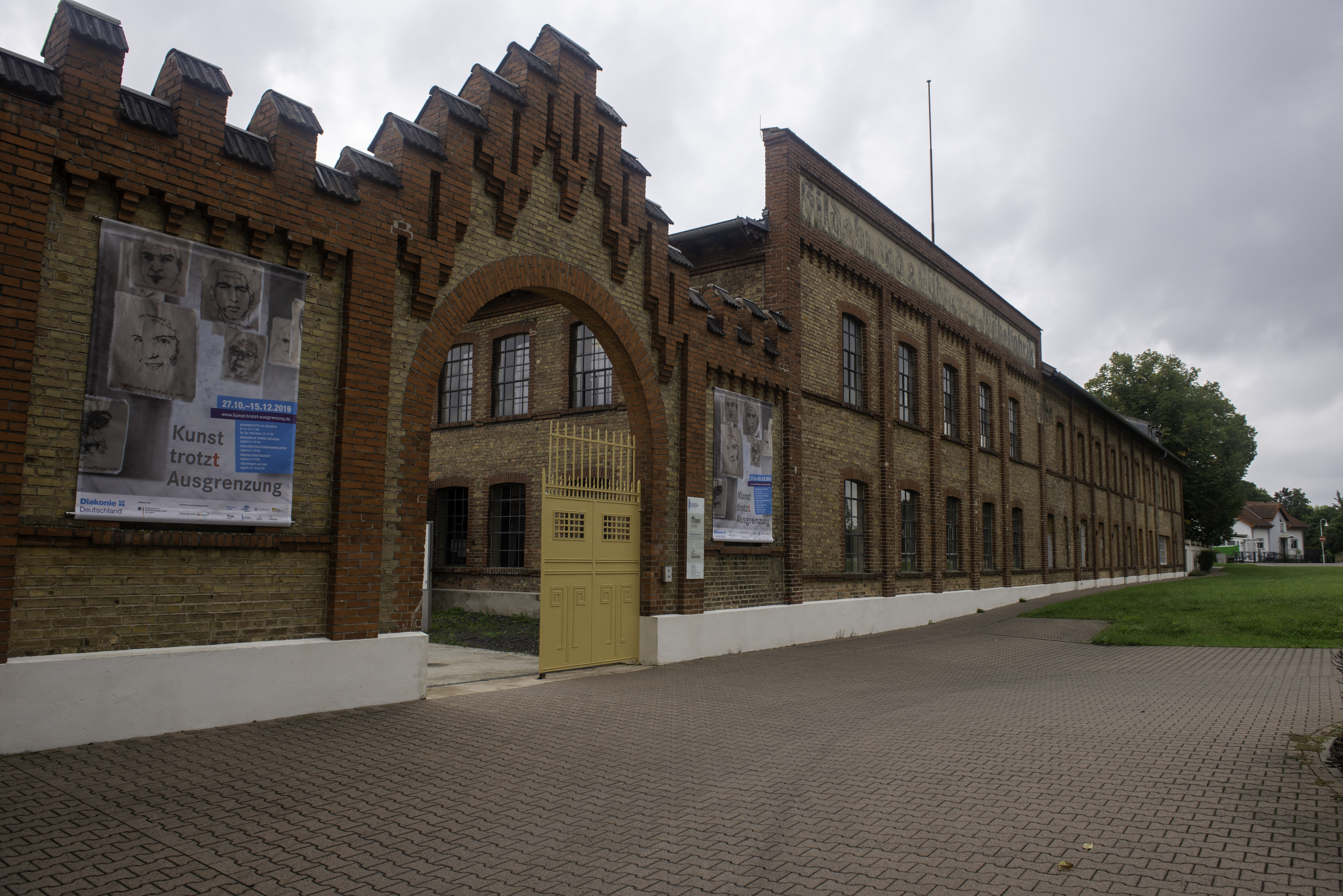
- Entrance to concentration camp memorial, 2019.
- Coordinates: 49°42′28″N 08°19′33″E
- Location: Osthofen, Germany
- Operated by: Hesse Political Police
- Commandant: Karl d'Angelo
- Original use: paper factory
- Operational: March 1933–July 1934
- Inmates: Political prisoners, Jehovah's Witnesses, Seventh-Day Adventists, Jews
- Number of inmates: 3,000
- Notable inmates: Max Dienemann; Carlo Mierendorff; Max Tschornicki
- Website: http://projektosthofen-gedenkstaette.de

The Osthofen concentration camp (German: KZ Osthofen) was an early Nazi concentration camp in Osthofen, close to Worms, Germany. It was established in March 1933 in a former paper factory. The camp was administered by the People's State of Hesse's Political Police, with guards first drawn from SA and SS, later only SS men. The first prisoners were mostly Communists or Social Democrats, but later Jehovah's Witnesses, Seventh-Day Adventists and non-political Jews were also sent to the camp.

Usually, Osthofen held 200 people at a time, with a total of about 3,000 prisoners over the existence of the camp. While none of the inmates died in the camp, many became sick due to the poor living conditions and hygiene. Abuse and humiliation of the prisoners, who were used as unpaid labourers, was common. One of the two prisoners who managed to escape from Osthofen, Max Tschornicki, met the author Anna Seghers in her Paris exile, and her novel The Seventh Cross, describes the conditions at a fictional "Westhofen concentration camp", inspired by Osthofen.

The site of the concentration camp was used as a furniture factory from 1936 to 1976, and the first plaque commemorating the existence of the camp was not installed until 1978. After activist pressure, the camp site was registered as a protected monument in 1989 and eventually turned into a memorial for the concentration camp by the state of Rhineland-Palatinate.

== History ==
The official history of the Osthofen concentration camp begins with a decree by the State Commissar for the Police in Hesse, Werner Best, on 1 May 1933. Anyone arrested for political reasons in Hesse for more than a week or expected to be imprisoned for more than a week was ordered to be sent to Osthofen. By this time, however, the camp had already been operating unofficially for months. After the 28 February 1933 Reichstag Fire Decree, civil liberties in Germany became restricted, and large numbers of Communists were arrested. On 6 March, the empty former paper factory in Ziegelhüttenweg was confiscated from its legal owner, Jewish businessman Karl Joehlinger. Large groups of prisoners began to be sent to the camp from 13 March 1933, with most of the early prisoners Communists or Social Democrats. From summer of 1933, also non-political Jews, Jehovah's Witnesses, Seventh-Day Adventists and others were imprisoned.

The camp was closed in July 1934 as a result of a centralisation of the concentration camps directed by Heinrich Himmler, and the 13 last prisoners were moved to other camps and prisons, including Dachau.

== Administration and guards ==
Osthofen was under the direction of the Hesse Political Police, which later became part of the Gestapo. Karl d'Angelo, a SS Sturmbannführer and the local Osthofen Nazi Party chairman, was made honorary camp leader on orders of Werner Best. Camp doctor was Reinhold Daum, who declared every single new arrival healthy and medically fit for imprisonment even if they had been mistreated. The camp guards were at first drawn mostly from local SA and SS men turned auxiliary police (95 SA and 99 SS, of which 55 served each day) but the SA were replaced by SS in autumn of 1933, significantly worsening conditions for the prisoners. None of the guards were prosecuted for their actions in the camp after 1945.

The existence of the concentration camp was not a secret, and was at the time widely commented on in the press, both locally and internationally. The New York Times reported on the camp and its imprisonment of Jews in August 1933. The camp sign, painted on the building in large letters, was clearly visible from passing trains.

== Conditions in the camp ==
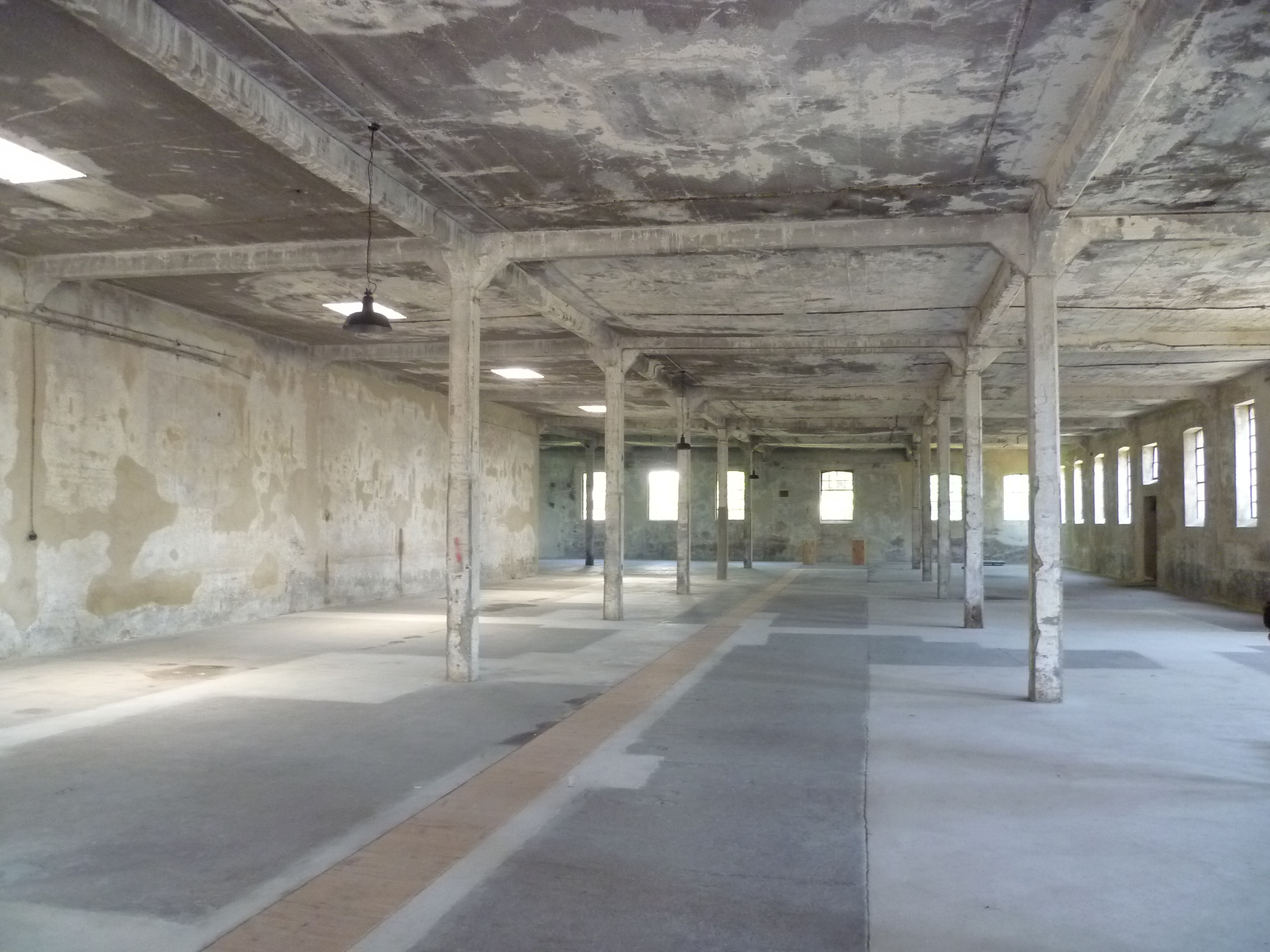
The hall in which prisoners used to sleep

Over the course of its existence, Osthofen held approximately 3,000 people. The average occupancy was about 200 prisoners, who were typically held for two to six weeks, but the length of their stays ranged from one week to one year. The prisoners, all of which were male, were used as unpaid labourers, often for the benefit of D'Angelo or other party members. Despite the poor living conditions and hygiene in the camp, with prisoners originally sleeping on the concrete floor, there are no recorded inmate deaths at Osthofen. Many became sick, however, and contracted chronic urinary tract diseases. The prisoners were routinely abused and humiliated, especially Jews. For example, Ernst Katz was severely beaten on Yom Kippur and forced to eat pork after he regained consciousness. The SPD politician Carlo Mierendorff was forced to straighten nails that his fellow prisoners had to bend. He was also beaten at night by assailants who were claimed to be communists, but that he identified as SA. In a nearby "Camp II", which was used for aggravated detention, prisoners had to spend the nights in wire cages, with lights on that made sleep difficult.

== Site history and legacy ==
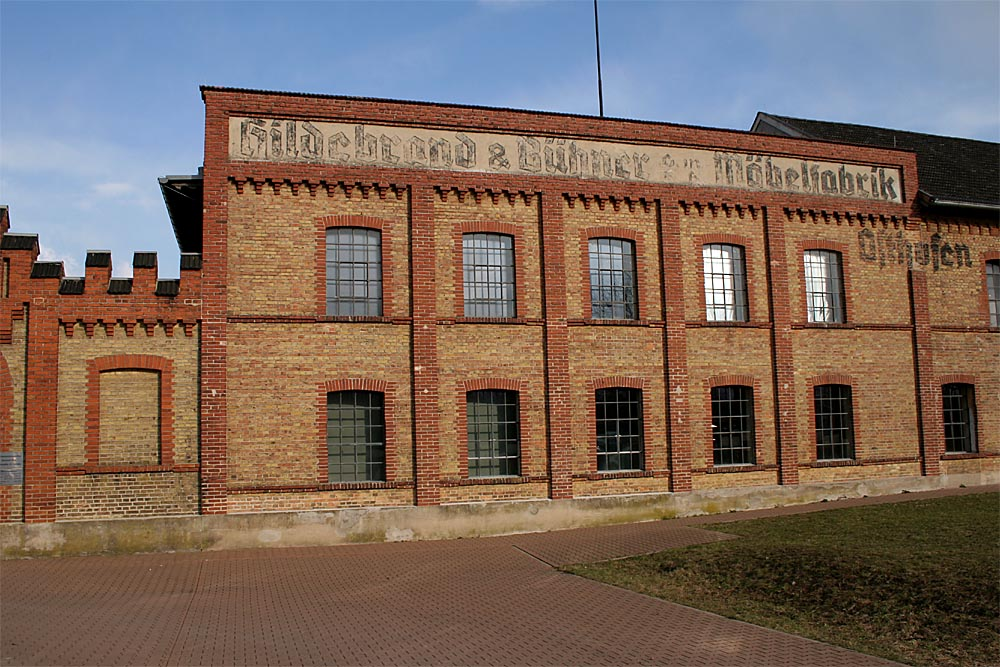
Furniture factory lettering on the wall of the memorial site

The main building was erected in 1872 as a paper factory owned by Gustav Rumpel. Under the ownership of Joseph Kahn, another factory hall was added in 1908. The paper factory was closed in the 1930s. After its use as a concentration camp, the site became a furniture factory from 1936 to 1976.

Former prisoners, supported by the Union of Persecutees of the Nazi Regime, started efforts to commemorate the history in 1972, which was at the time opposed by locals. A first memorial plaque was installed in 1978. A first book with "materials about an almost forgotten concentration camp" was compiled in 1979 by former Buchenwald detainee Paul Grünewald. After further activist involvement by the youth wing of the German Trade Union Confederation and others, the camp building became a protected monument in 1989. The state of Rhineland-Palatinate bought the site in 1991 and turned it into a memorial, which was completed in 2004.

== Literary adaptation ==
In her 1942 novel The Seventh Cross (adapted as a film in 1944), Anna Seghers describes a fictitious "Westhofen" concentration camp located in the same area, clearly referring to Osthofen. Max Tschornicki, one of the two inmates who escaped from Osthofen, had met Seghers in Paris and told her of his experiences in the camp. The novel realistically describes conditions in the camp and the political persecution in Rhenish Hesse. While The Seventh Cross has been called a "memorial" to the Osthofen inmates, its plot, set in 1937, is inspired by an escape from Sachsenhausen concentration camp.

== Notable prisoners ==
- Max Dienemann, rabbi
- Georg Fröba, trade union activist and chairman of the Darmstadt branch of the KPD
- Carlo Mierendorff, SPD politician and member of parliament, imprisoned from 21 June 1933
- Peter Paul Nahm, journalist and politician of the Centre Party
- Max Tschornicki, Jewish lawyer and resistance member, escaped from the camp on 3 July 1933
