= The Dead Stay Young =

1949 novel by Anna Seghers

The Dead Stay Young (Die Toten Bleiben Jung) is a 1949 novel by German author Anna Seghers. The book describes the lives of a group of people related to each other by their involvement in a political crime at the end of World War I. The novel traces the lives of the perpetrators and of the lover of the victim, a young communist, including that of their children. Doing so, Seghers sketches a panorama of German society during the Weimar republic and the years of the Nazi state. The novel ends in the final days of World War II. One of Seghers' aims was to describe the entire social and political spectrum of Germans in these years, ranging from communists secretly working in Germany between the end of World War I and the end of World War II to officers of the German Wehrmacht, and from urban centres to farmer's villages. Her sympathies are clearly on the side of those resisting the National Socialist government.
