= The Best Thing for You (album) =

Studio album by Chet Baker
- Released: 1989
- Recorded: February 16, 21–22 and May 13, 1977
- Studio: Sound Ideas Studio, NYC
- Genre: Jazz
- Length: 41:10
- Label: A&M; CD 0832
- Producer: Don Sebesky

Chet Baker chronology
You Can't Go Home Again (1977)	The Best Thing for You (1989)	The Incredible Chet Baker Plays and Sings (1977)

The Best Thing for You is an album by trumpeter Chet Baker which was recorded in 1977 but not released on the A&M label until 1989, after the performer's death. The tracks were rereleased as part of the double CD reissue of You Can't Go Home Again in 2000 with previously unreleased tracks and alternate takes.

== Reception ==
Professional ratings
Review scores
Source	Rating
Allmusic	4/5 stars

The Allmusic review by Scott Yanow states "This CD features previously unissued material from the same sessions that resulted in You Can't Go Home Again and, if anything, the music is a touch better. ... Throughout, Chet Baker shows that his playing during his much documented final period would be equal if not superior to his more acclaimed recordings of the 1950s".

== Track listing ==
1. "The Best Thing for You" (Irving Berlin) – 4:20
2. "I'm Getting Sentimental Over You/You've Changed" (George Bassman, Ned Washington/ Bill Carey, Carl Fischer) – 6:05
3. "Oh, You Crazy Moon" (Jimmy Van Heusen, Johnny Burke) – 3:38
4. "How Deep Is the Ocean?" (Berlin) – 5:49
5. "If You Could See Me Now" (Tadd Dameron, Carl Sigman) – 4:43
6. "El Morro" (Sebesky) – 17:13

== Personnel ==
- Chet Baker – trumpet
- Paul Desmond – alto saxophone
- Ron Carter – bass
- Kenny Barron – piano
- Tony Williams – drums
- John Scofield – electric and acoustic guitar (track 6)
- Richie Beirach – electric piano (track 6)
- Hubert Laws – flute (track 6)
- Michael Brecker – tenor saxophone (track 6)
- Arto Tuncboyaciyan – percussion, voice (track 6)
- Gene Bertoncini – acoustic guitar (track 5)
