= Two of a Mind =

Studio album by Paul Desmond and Gerry Mulligan
- Released: 1962
- Recorded: June 26, July 3 and August 13, 1962
- Studio: RCA Studio A, New York City
- Genre: Jazz
- Length: 74:52
- Label: RCA Victor LPM 2624
- Producer: Bob Prince & George Avakian

Paul Desmond chronology
Desmond Blue (1961)	Two of a Mind (1962)	Take Ten (1963)

Gerry Mulligan chronology
Jeru (1962)	Two of a Mind (1962)	Spring Is Sprung (1962)

Two of a Mind is an album recorded by American jazz saxophonists Paul Desmond and Gerry Mulligan featuring performances recorded in 1962 which were released on the RCA Victor label. The album is the second of two albums Mulligan and Desmond recorded in a pianoless quartet setting. The first, recorded in 1957, was Blues in Time (originally titled Gerry Mulligan - Paul Desmond Quartet).

The album's title track is a contrafact based on "Look for the Silver Lining".

== Reception ==
Professional ratings
Review scores
Source	Rating
Allmusic	4.5/5 stars
Encyclopedia of Popular Music	5/5 stars
The Penguin Guide to Jazz Recordings	4/4 stars

Allmusic awarded the album 4½ stars stating "Altoist Paul Desmond and baritonist Gerry Mulligan always made for a perfect team during their infrequent collaborations. Both of the saxophonists had immediately distinctive light tones, strong wits, and the ability to improvise melodically. ... the interplay between Desmond and Mulligan is consistently delightful. Highly recommended".

== Track listing ==
1. "All the Things You Are" (Jerome Kern, Oscar Hammerstein II) – 5:51
2. "Stardust" (Hoagy Carmichael, Mitchell Parish) – 8:22
3. "Two of a Mind" (Paul Desmond) – 5:59
4. "Blight of the Fumble Bee" (Gerry Mulligan) – 7:02
5. "The Way You Look Tonight" (Kern, Dorothy Fields) – 7:21
6. "Out of Nowhere" (Johnny Green, Edward Heyman) – 6:35
7. "Easy Living" (Ralph Rainger, Leo Robin) – 7:29 Bonus track on CD reissue
8. "All the Things You Are" [alternate take] (Kern, Hammerstein) – 6:58 Bonus track on CD reissue
9. "The Way You Look Tonight" [alternate take] (Kern, Fields) – 7:52 Bonus track on CD reissue
10. "Untitled Blues Waltz" (Desmond, Mulligan) – 9:45 Bonus track on CD reissue
11. "Untitled Blues Waltz" [breakdown] (Desmond, Mulligan) – 1:38 Bonus track on CD reissue

Note

- Recorded at Webster Hall in New York City on June 8, 1962 (tracks 10 & 11) and at RCA Studio A in New York City on June 26, 1962 (tracks 4, 5 & 7), July 3, 1962 (tracks 1, 2 & 8) and August 13, 1962 (tracks 3, 6 & 9).

== Personnel ==
- Paul Desmond – alto saxophone
- Gerry Mulligan – baritone saxophone
- Jim Hall – guitar (tracks 10 & 11)
- John Beal (tracks 4, 5, 7, 10 & 11), Joe Benjamin (tracks 3, 6 & 9), Wendell Marshall (tracks 1, 2 & 8) – bass
- Connie Kay (tracks 1, 2, 4, 5, 7 & 8), Mel Lewis (tracks 3, 6 & 9), Ed Shaughnessy (tracks 10 & 11) – drums
