= Helen Deutsch =

American screenwriter

Helen Deutsch

Helen Deutsch (March 21, 1906 – March 15, 1992) was an American screenwriter, journalist, and songwriter.

== Biography ==
Deutsch was born in New York City and graduated from Barnard College. She began her career by managing the Provincetown Players. She then wrote theater reviews for The New York Herald-Tribune and The New York Times, as well as working in the press department of the Theatre Guild.

She was the driving force behind the founding of the New York Drama Critics Circle in 1934, by which local critics vote annually on the top plays and performers on Broadway.

Her first screenplay was for The Seventh Cross (1944), based on Anna Seghers's 1942 novel of the same name, directed by Fred Zinnemann and featuring Spencer Tracy. She adapted Enid Bagnold's novel, National Velvet into a screenplay that became a famous film (1944) starring Elizabeth Taylor. After writing a few films (Golden Earrings (1947), The Loves of Carmen (1948) and Shockproof (1949) ) for Paramount and Columbia Pictures, she spent the greater part of her career working for Metro-Goldwyn-Mayer.

There, she wrote the screenplays for such films as King Solomon's Mines (1950), Kim (1950), It's a Big Country (1951), Plymouth Adventure (1952), Lili (1953), Flame and the Flesh (1954), The Glass Slipper (1955), I'll Cry Tomorrow (1955), Forever, Darling (1956) and The Unsinkable Molly Brown (1964).

Her last screenplay was for 20th Century Fox's Valley of the Dolls (1967). She wrote 15 screenplays in total.

Helen Deutsch died in New York City of natural causes.

== Lili ==
Deutsch got the idea for Lili from a Paul Gallico short story, The Three Lives of Thomasina. The film tells the story of a girl who is orphaned and joins a circus. Deutsch cast Leslie Caron after seeing the rushes for An American in Paris.

As part of her work for Lili, Deutsch wrote the lyric of the song Hi-Lili, Hi-Lo, which has been a popular bittersweet ballad for cabaret singers ever since. Branislau Kaper composed the music for it and the song was sung by Leslie Caron on the movie soundtrack.

Deutsch was nominated for the Academy Award for the screenplay of Lili, which won her a Golden Globe Award, as well as awards from the Cannes Film Festival and Writers Guild of America.

In 1961, the Broadway version of the musical Carnival! was based on Lili and starred Anna Maria Alberghetti. Deutsch attempted to write the libretto, but was replaced by Michael Stewart. The show was nominated for two Tony awards.

== "The White Magnolia Tree" ==
Shortly after Deutsch's Barnard graduation, she was asked to write something to recite on a radio show to be aired just two days later in honor of the late actress Jane Cowl. Overnight, Deutsch wrote "The White Magnolia Tree." She then forgot about the poem. In 1957, she was commissioned by NBC-TV to provide a poem to be recited by Helen Hayes for the 50th anniversary celebration of General Motors. She got out her old poem, and Helen Hayes recited it with such tenderness that within a week thousands of people had requested a copy of the poem. General Motors provided it in booklet form. Helen Hayes herself made a 45 rpm of the poem and sent out hundreds of copies. It was released in Australia as His Master's Voice catalogue EA 52001.

In Australia, the Helen Hayes version was superseded when Gay Kayler (Gay Kahler) recorded her version of The White Magnolia Tree with a lush 32-piece orchestral backing. This became Gay's signature tune and remained in EMI and Reader's Digest catalogues (appearing on the Family Favourites box set) for more than 33 years.
