= The Seventh Cross (film) =

1944 film by Fred Zinnemann, Andrew Marton

- Directed by: Fred Zinnemann
- Screenplay by: Helen Deutsch
- Based on: The Seventh Cross; 1942 novel by Anna Seghers
- Produced by: Pandro S. Berman
- Starring: Spencer Tracy; Signe Hasso; Hume Cronyn; Jessica Tandy; Agnes Moorehead; Herbert Rudley; Felix Bressart; Ray Collins
- Cinematography: Karl Freund
- Edited by: Thomas Richards
- Music by: Roy Webb
- Production company: Metro-Goldwyn-Mayer
- Distributed by: Loew's Inc.
- Release date: July 24, 1944
- Running time: 110 minutes
- Language: English
- Budget: $1.3 million
- Box office: $3.6 million

The Seventh Cross is a 1944 American drama film, set in Nazi Germany, starring Spencer Tracy as a prisoner who escaped from a concentration camp. The story chronicles how he interacts with ordinary Germans and gradually sheds his cynical view of humanity.

The film co-stars Hume Cronyn, who was nominated for the Oscar for Best Supporting Actor. It was the first film in which Cronyn appeared with his wife Jessica Tandy, and was among the first feature films directed by Fred Zinnemann; it was his first hit movie.

The movie was adapted from the 1942 novel of the same name by the German refugee writer Anna Seghers. Produced in the midst of World War II, The Seventh Cross was one of the few films made during the war to deal with the existence of Nazi concentration camps.

== Plot ==
In 1936 in Germany, seven prisoners escape from the fictitious Westhofen concentration camp (partly based on the real Osthofen concentration camp) near the Rhine. The escapees are: a writer, a circus performer, a schoolmaster, a farmer, a Jewish grocery clerk, George Heisler, and his friend, Wallau.

The sadistic camp commandant erects a row of seven crosses and vows to "put a man on each". The first to be apprehended is Wallau, who dies without giving up any information. With the dead Wallau narrating, the film follows Heisler as he makes his way across the German countryside, stealing a jacket to cover his prison garb. The Nazis round up other escaped prisoners, where they are returned to the camp and hung on crosses, suspended by their arms tied behind their backs.

Heisler travels to his home city Mainz, where his former girlfriend, Leni, resides. She had promised to wait for him, but she has since married and refuses to help. While Heisler hides nearby, another of the escapees, the acrobat, leaps to his death to avoid being captured. Mme. Marelli, unaware that he and the acrobat have escaped, gives him a suit of clothes that were intended for the acrobat. Another prisoner, the writer, tracks Heisler down and almost convinces him to give himself up along with him. With Heisler's options further limited, he goes to see an old friend, Paul Roeder. Heisler tries to avoid telling Roeder he is an escapee, but eventually tells him and tries to leave to keep him out of trouble. Though Roeder is a factory worker with a wife and young children, he still risks helping Heisler.

Roeder goes to see Heisler's old friend Sauer, but Sauer refuses to help him. Sauer, feeling guilty about refusing to help, goes to see Marnet and his friends in the German underground. The group figures out that Heisler is hiding with Roeder, but they leave for a new hiding place in an inn just before Marnet arrives. Roeder is taken in for questioning by the Gestapo, but is released without giving any information. The underground group gets false identification papers to Heisler and tells him where to rendezvous with a ship that will help him escape Germany. Through his exposure to this courage and kindness, and with the help of the sympathetic waitress at the inn, Toni, Heisler regains his faith in humanity. He escapes via the boat to an unknown destination that he identifies as "probably Holland".

== Cast ==
- Spencer Tracy as George Heisler
- Signe Hasso as Toni
- Hume Cronyn as Paul Roeder
- Jessica Tandy as Liesel Roeder
- Agnes Moorehead as Madame Marelli
- Herbert Rudley as Franz Marnet
- Felix Bressart as Poldi Schlamm
- Ray Collins as Ernst Wallau / narrator
- Alexander Granach as Zillich
- Katherine Locke as Frau Hedy Sauer
- George Macready as Bruno Sauer
- Paul Guilfoyle as Fiedler
- Stephen Geray as Dr. Loewenstein
- Kurt Katch as Leo Hermann
- Kaaren Verne as Leni
- Konstantin Shayne as Fuellgrabe, a writer
- George Suzanne as Bellani, an acrobat
- John Wengraf as Overkamp
- George Zucco as Fahrenburg
- Steven Muller as Hellwig
- Eily Malyon as Fräulein Bachmann
- Lisa Golm as Frau Hinkel
- James Dime as a prisoner in a concentration camp

== Production ==
Anna Seghers, the author of the novel from which this movie was adapted, was a Communist, and Wallau and Heisler were Communists in the book. In Helen Deutsch's script, their political affiliation is not given. The political thrust of the film is thus about the anti-Fascist German resistance. Refugees from Nazi Germany played many small roles, with the small uncredited bit part of a janitor played by Helene Weigel, the prominent German actress and wife of Bertolt Brecht. Hugh Beaumont has an uncredited role as a truck driver.

MGM publicity played up the fleeting romantic element between Tracy's character and that of the Swedish actress, Signe Hasso, with the tagline: "The revealing novel of a hunted man's search for love!"

== Reception ==
Film critic and author James Agee reviewed it in 1944: "...Metro-Goldwyn-Mayer has used it, with every good intention I am sure, to crucify the possiblities of a very fine movie." Leslie Halliwell gave it two of four stars: "Impressive melodrama...Old-style Hollywood production at its best; but a rather obviously contrived story." Leonard Maltin gave the film three out of four stars in his Movie Guide: "Exciting film makes strong statement about a cynic who regains hope when others risk their lives to save him."

== Box office ==
According to MGM records, the film earned $2,082,000 in the US and Canada and $1,489,000 elsewhere resulting in a profit of $1,021,000.

== Award ==
Hume Cronyn received an Academy Award nomination as Actor in a Supporting Role for his performance as Paul Roeder.
