= Desmond Blue =

Studio album by Paul Desmond
- Released: February 1962
- Recorded: September 13 & 28 and October 2, 1961
- Venue: Webster Hall, New York City
- Genre: Jazz
- Length: 48:52
- Label: RCA Victor
- Producer: George Avakian

Paul Desmond chronology
First Place Again (1959)	Desmond Blue (1962)	Two of a Mind (1962)

Desmond Blue is an album recorded by American jazz saxophonist Paul Desmond released in 1962 and was his first LP for RCA Victor. The album was produced by George Avakian, who had worked with Desmond at Columbia Records (when Desmond was recorded as part of the Dave Brubeck Quartet). Avakian left Columbia in 1958 to join the brand new Warner Bros. Records, where he produced Desmond's previous album, First Place Again. Joining RCA Victor in 1960, Avakian once again recruited Desmond to his label, and he produced all six of the albums Desmond recorded for RCA Victor as a leader. Desmond Blue was also the first Desmond solo album to feature the saxophonist in an orchestral setting. RCA reissued the album in 1978 as Paul Desmond - Pure Gold Jazz (ANL1-2807). Desmond returned to the orchestral format later in the decade, when he signed with CTI Records and recorded Summertime.

== Reception ==
Professional ratings
Review scores
Source	Rating
Allmusic	4/5 stars
The Penguin Guide to Jazz Recordings	3/4 stars
DownBeat	3/5 stars

Allmusic awarded the album 4 stars stating "The tone of the album: lush, reflective, thought-provoking, and soul-stirring. This work is quite a plus for any listener and especially those who consider themselves avid fans of Paul Desmond".

== Track listing ==
All compositions by Paul Desmond except where noted.

1. "My Funny Valentine" (Richard Rodgers, Lorenz Hart) – 3:53
2. "Desmond Blue" – 3:42
3. "Then I'll Be Tired of You" (Arthur Schwartz, Yip Harburg) – 4:08
4. "I've Got You Under My Skin" (Cole Porter) – 4:41
5. "Late Lament" – 4:11
6. "I Should Care" (Axel Stordahl, Paul Weston, Sammy Cahn) – 3:52
7. "Like Someone in Love" (Jimmy Van Heusen, Johnny Burke) – 4:13
8. "Ill Wind" (Harold Arlen, Ted Koehler) – 3:52
9. "Body and Soul" (Johnny Green, Frank Eyton, Edward Heyman, Robert Sour) – 4:51

Note

- Recorded at Webster Hall in New York City on September 13, 1961 (track 1), September 28, 1961 (tracks 5–7) and October 2, 1961 (tracks 2–4, 8 & 9).

== Personnel ==
- Paul Desmond – alto saxophone
- Albert Richman – French horn (tracks 1–4, 8 & 9)
- Phil Bodner (tracks 5–7), Robert Doty (track 1), George Marge (track 1), Romeo Penque (tracks 2–9), Stan Webb (tracks 2–4, 8 & 9) – woodwinds
- Gloria Agostini (tracks 2–9), Eugene Bianco (track 1) – harp
- Jim Hall – guitar
- Gene Cherico (track 1), Milt Hinton (tracks 2–9) – bass
- Connie Kay (track 1), Bobby Thomas (tracks 2–9) – drums
- Unidentified string section conducted by Bob Prince
