= Bossa Antigua =

Studio album by Paul Desmond
- Released: 1965
- Recorded: July 28 & 29, 1964, August 20, 1964 and September 8, 1964; RCA Studio A, New York City
- Genre: Jazz
- Length: 58:45
- Label: RCA Victor LPM 3320
- Producer: George Avakian

Paul Desmond chronology
Take Ten (1963)	Bossa Antigua (1965)	Glad to Be Unhappy (1964)

Bossa Antigua is an album recorded by American jazz saxophonist Paul Desmond featuring performances recorded in 1964 which were released on the RCA Victor label. The album title is a word play on bossa nova (in English, "the new thing"), the genre of Brazilian music that inspired the album. "Bossa Antigua" loosely translates in English to "old thing", though "antigua" is a Spanish word rather than Portuguese ("bossa antiga" would be a more accurate Portuguese translation of Desmond's joke). Antigua is also the name an island in the West Indies popular with North American tourists.

== Context ==
Desmond recorded the majority of Bossa Antigua between July 28 and September 8, 1964, which coincided with the height of the popularity of bossa nova in the United States. Bossa nova had been embraced and popularized by North American musicians following the release of Stan Getz's album Jazz Samba in 1962. Other American jazz saxophonists who subsequently made bossa nova recordings include Zoot Sims, Coleman Hawkins, Gene Ammons, Cannonball Adderley and Desmond himself, with his 1963 album Take Ten. The genre's biggest chart success in the U.S. was Getz's recording of "The Girl from Ipanema", which peaked at number five in the U.S. on the Billboard Hot 100 singles chart on July 17, 1964.

Desmond would continue to incorporate Brazilian rhythms and songs into his music for the rest of his life, recording an album of Brazilian music in 1969 (From the Hot Afternoon), and the songs "Wave", "Manhã de Carnaval", and "Meditation" in 1975 with his final working group for the albums Live and the posthumous Like Someone in Love.

== Reception ==
Professional ratings
Review scores
Source	Rating
Allmusic	4/5 stars
The Penguin Guide to Jazz Recordings	3/4 stars
Record Mirror	2/5 stars

Allmusic awarded the album 4 stars, stating, "The playing is wonderful throughout, though just missing the full-throttle inspiration of Take Ten".

== Track listing ==
All compositions by Paul Desmond except where noted.

1. "Bossa Antigua" – 4:43
2. "The Night Has a Thousand Eyes" (Jerry Brainin, Buddy Bernier) – 5:04
3. "O Gato" (Jane Herbert) – 4:33
4. "Samba Cantina" – 5:38
5. "Curacao Doloroso" – 4:30
6. "A Ship Without a Sail" (Richard Rodgers, Lorenz Hart) – 6:18
7. "Alianca" – 4:29
8. "The Girl from East 9th Street" – 6:13
9. "The Night Has a Thousand Eyes" [alternate take] (Brainin, Bernier) – 7:18 Bonus track on CD reissue
10. "Samba Cepeda" – 5:06 Bonus track on CD reissue
11. "O Gato" [alternate take] – 4:53 Bonus track on CD reissue
- Recorded Webster Hall on June 13, 1964 (track 8) and RCA Studio A in New York City on July 28, 1964 (tracks 1, 4 & 10), July 29, 1964 (tracks 2, 6 & 9), August 20, 1964 (tracks 3, 5 & 11), and September 8, 1964 (track 7).

== Personnel ==
- Paul Desmond – alto saxophone
- Jim Hall – guitar
- Gene Cherico (track 8), Eugene Wright (tracks 1–7 & 9–11) – bass
- Connie Kay – drums
