= You Can't Go Home Again (album) =

Studio album by Chet Baker
- Released: 1977
- Recorded: February 16, 21–22 & May 13, 1977
- Studio: Sound Ideas Studio, NYC
- Genre: Jazz
- Length: 155:34 (2CD)
- Label: Horizon; Verve (2CD)
- Producer: Don Sebesky

Chet Baker chronology
Once Upon a Summertime (1977)	You Can't Go Home Again (1977)	The Best Thing for You (1977)

You Can't Go Home Again is an album by trumpeter Chet Baker, recorded in 1977 and released on the Horizon label. In 2000, the album was rereleased as a double CD with additional tracks from The Best Thing for You (1989) along with previously unreleased tracks and alternate takes.

== Reception ==
Professional ratings
Review scores
Source	Rating
AllMusic	3/5 stars
DownBeat	3/5 stars
The Penguin Guide to Jazz Recordings	3/4 stars
The Rolling Stone Jazz Record Guide	3/5 stars

The AllMusic review by Heather Phares calls it "one of Baker's most important latter-day albums".

== Track listing ==
=== Original LP release (1977) ===
A1. "Love For Sale" (Cole Porter) – 12:58
A2. "Un Poco Loco" (Bud Powell) – 9:20
B1. "You Can't Go Home Again" (Don Sebesky) – 5:43
B2. "El Morro" (Sebesky) – 13:44

=== Double CD release (2000) ===
Disc 1

1. "Love for Sale" (Porter) – 13:03
2. "Un Poco Loco" (Powell) – 9:26
3. "You Can't Go Home Again" (Sebesky) – 5:47
4. "El Morro" (Sebesky) – 14:18
5. "The Best Thing for You" (Irving Berlin) – 4:20 First released on The Best Thing for You
6. "I'm Getting Sentimental Over You/You've Changed" (George Bassman, Ned Washington/ Bill Carey, Carl Fischer) – 6:05 First released on The Best Thing for You
7. "Oh, You Crazy Moon" (Jimmy Van Heusen, Johnny Burke) – 3:38 First released on The Best Thing for You
8. "How Deep Is the Ocean?" (Berlin) – 5:49 First released on The Best Thing for You
9. "If You Could See Me Now" (Tadd Dameron, Carl Sigman) – 4:43 First released on The Best Thing for You
10. "You Can't Go Home Again" [alternate take] (Sebesky) – 6:31 previously unissued
11. "I'm Getting Sentimental Over You/You've Changed" [alternate take] (Bassman, Washington/Carey, Fischer) – 6:08 previously unissued

Disk 2

1. "El Morro" (Sebesky) – 17:13 First released on The Best Thing for You
2. "Out of Our Hands" (Richie Beirach) – 10:36 previously unissued
3. "Broken Wing" (Beirach) – 5:21 previously unissued
4. "Paradox" (Beirach) – 6:09 previously unissued
5. "Blues" (Traditional) – 7:59 previously unissued
6. "The Best Thing for You" [alternate take] (Berlin) – 4:28 previously unissued
7. "How Deep Is the Ocean?" [alternate take] (Berlin) – 5:45 previously unissued
8. "If You Could See Me Now" [alternate take] (Dameron, Sigman) – 5:02 previously unissued
9. "El Morro" [incomplete take] (Sebesky) – 13:13 previously unissued

== Personnel ==
- Chet Baker – trumpet
- Hubert Laws – flute, bass flute, piccolo
- Paul Desmond – alto saxophone
- Michael Brecker – tenor saxophone
- John Campo – bassoon
- Don Sebesky, Kenny Barron – electric piano
- Richie Beirach – electric piano, clavinet
- John Scofield – guitar
- Gene Bertoncini – acoustic guitar
- Ron Carter – bass
- Alphonso Johnson – electric bass
- Tony Williams – drums
- Ralph MacDonald – percussion
- String section arranged and conducted by Don Sebesky
  - Charles Libove, David Nadien, Diana Halprin, Harold Kohon, Marvin Morgenstern, Matthew Raimondi, Max Ellen, Paul Gersham, Rochelle Abramson – violin
  - Alan Shulman, Charles McCracken, Jesse Levy – cello
