= Angel Eyes (Dave Brubeck album) =

Studio album by Dave Brubeck
- Released: July 2, 1965
- Recorded: July 2, 1962 – February 15, 1965
- Genre: Jazz
- Length: 38:14
- Label: Columbia
- Producer: Teo Macero

Dave Brubeck chronology
Jazz Impressions of New York (1964)	Angel Eyes (1965)	My Favorite Things (1965)

Angel Eyes is a 1965 studio album by Dave Brubeck and his quartet of music by Matt Dennis. The album peaked at 122 on the Billboard 200. The cover features a photo of model Terry Reno, who also appeared on the cover of My Favorite Things.

== Reception ==
Professional ratings
Review scores
Source	Rating
Allmusic	3/5 stars
Record Mirror	4/5 stars

The album was reviewed by Scott Yanow at Allmusic, writing that the songs "... are given superior and swinging treatments with fine solos from Brubeck and altoist Paul Desmond."

== Track listing ==
All music composed by Matt Dennis, lyricists indicated

1. "Let's Get Away from It All" (Tom Adair) – 3:55
2. "Violets for Your Furs" (Adair) – 5:53
3. "Angel Eyes" (Earl Brent) – 7:25
4. "Will You Still Be Mine?" (Adair) – 5:24
5. "Everything Happens to Me" (Adair) – 5:49
6. "Little Man With a Candy Cigar" (Frank Killduff) – 3:37
7. "The Night We Called It a Day" (Adair) – 6:11

== Personnel ==
- Dave Brubeck – piano
- Paul Desmond – alto saxophone
- Gene Wright – double bass
- Joe Morello – drums
- Teo Macero – producer
