= Blues in Time =

Studio album by Gerry Mulligan and Paul Desmond
- Released: Late November/early December 1957
- Recorded: August 2, 27, 1957
- Studio: Capitol (Hollywood); Fine Sound (New York City)
- Genre: Jazz
- Length: 45:48
- Label: Verve; MGV 8246
- Producer: Norman Granz

Alternative cover
- Verve V 8478 edition

Professional ratings
Review scores
Source	Rating
AllMusic	4/5 stars
Disc	5/5 stars
DownBeat	4/5 stars
Encyclopedia of Popular Music	4/5 stars
The Penguin Guide to Jazz Recordings	3.5/4 stars

Gerry Mulligan - Paul Desmond Quartet (later retitled Blues in Time) is a jazz album by Paul Desmond and Gerry Mulligan released in 1957 on the Verve label. The idea for this album was born in 1954, then postponed till summer of 1957 when Desmond suggested to record some pieces together. Producer Norman Granz managed to set up the recording date for the first session in August. Blues in Time was also reissued on Verve V 8478 with a different cover (see below). The album is the first of two albums Mulligan and Desmond recorded in a pianoless quartet setting. The second, recorded in 1962, was Two of a Mind.

== Contrafacts ==
Four of the original compositions on the album are contrafacts. They are:

- "Stand Still" (based on "My Heart Stood Still")
- "Wintersong" (based on "These Foolish Things")
- "Battle Hymn of the Republican" (based on "Tea for Two")
- "Fall Out" (based on "Let's Fall in Love")

== Track listing ==
=== Original LP ===
1. "Blues in Time" (Paul Desmond) – 9:01
2. "Body and Soul" (Johnny Green, Edward Heyman, Robert Sour, Frank Eyton) – 9:38
3. "Standstill" (Gerry Mulligan) – 3:30
4. "Line for Lyons" (Mulligan) – 3:08
5. "Wintersong" (Desmond) – 6:58
6. "Battle Hymn of the Republican" (Desmond) – 7:45
7. "Fall Out" (Mulligan) – 5:45

=== Bonus tracks released on 1993 U.S. Verve CD ===
- "Tea for Two" (Vincent Youmans) - 7:56
- "Wintersong (take 2) - 8:08
- "Lover" (Richard Rodgers) - 6:43

== Personnel ==
- Paul Desmond – alto saxophone
- Gerry Mulligan – baritone saxophone
- Dave Bailey – drums
- Joe Benjamin – bass
