= Paul Desmond =

American jazz saxophonist and composer (1924–1977)

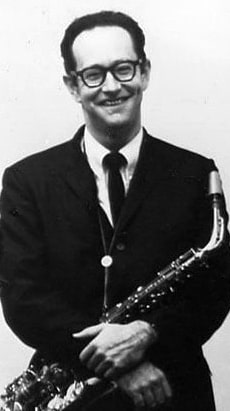
- Desmond c. 1962

Background information
- Born: Paul Emil Breitenfeld; November 25, 1924; San Francisco, California, U.S.
- Died: May 30, 1977 (aged 52) New York City, U.S.
- Genres: Cool jazz; West Coast jazz; mainstream jazz
- Occupations: Musician; composer; arranger
- Instruments: Alto saxophone; clarinet
- Years active: 1940s–1977
- Labels: Columbia; RCA Victor; Horizon; CTI; A&M
- Formerly of: The Dave Brubeck Quartet

Paul Desmond (born Paul Emil Breitenfeld; November 25, 1924 – May 30, 1977) was an American jazz alto saxophonist and composer and proponent of cool jazz. He was a member of the Dave Brubeck Quartet and composed the group's biggest hit, "Take Five". The song remains the best-selling jazz song of all time.

In addition to his work with Brubeck, he led several groups and collaborated with Gerry Mulligan, Chet Baker, Jim Hall, and Ed Bickert. After years of chain smoking and poor health, Desmond succumbed to lung cancer in 1977 after a tour with Brubeck.

== Early life ==
Desmond was born Paul Emil Breitenfeld in San Francisco, California, in 1924, the son of Shirley (née King) and Emil Aron Breitenfeld. His grandfather Sigmund Breitenfeld, a medical doctor, was born on November 17, 1857, in Kameničky in Eastern Bohemia; he emigrated to the US in 1885 and on May 2, 1886, in New York, married Hermina Lewy. They had four children (including Emil, father of Paul Emil). Paul Desmond and members of his father's family "frequently speculated as to whether Sigmund or Hermine Breitenfeld had Jewish backgrounds", though they did not identify as Jewish or observe Jewish traditions. However, Fred Barton, composer and cousin to Desmond, found extensive genealogical proof that both the Breitenfeld and Löwy families were Bohemian Jews. The Breitenfeld family in Bohemia and Vienna featured musicians in every generation throughout the 1800s, 1900s, and to the present day. Desmond's mother, born Shirley King, was of an Irish Catholic family.

Desmond's father, Emil Breitenfeld, was a pianist, organist, arranger, and composer who accompanied silent films in movie theaters and produced musical arrangements for printed publication and for live theatrical productions. During World War I, while training with the 17th New York Regiment in Plattsburgh, New York, he composed The Last Long Mile, one of the best-known soldiers' songs of the war.

Desmond's mother, Shirley, was emotionally unstable throughout his upbringing and appears to have suffered from obsessive–compulsive disorder and other mental illnesses. Starting in 1933, Desmond spent nearly five years living with relatives in New Rochelle, New York, due to his mother's mental health problems.

Desmond began playing the clarinet at the age of twelve and continued to do so throughout his time at San Francisco Polytechnic High School. While in high school, he expressed an interest in learning the violin, but his father discouraged him, claiming that violin players were "a dime a dozen" and warning him that with the violin, "you'll starve." Also during high school, Desmond developed a talent for writing and became the co-editor of his school newspaper. In this role, he had the opportunity to interview comedian Bob Hope when he visited San Francisco. After graduating from high school, Desmond enrolled at San Francisco State College, where he majored in English. While in college, Desmond began playing the alto saxophone, after being influenced by the likes of Lester Young and Charlie Parker. In his first year of college, Desmond was drafted into the United States Army and joined the Army band while stationed in San Francisco. He spent three years in the military, but his unit was not called to combat.

Following his military discharge, Paul Emil Breitenfeld legally changed his last name from Breitenfeld to Desmond in 1946. He told many stories over the years regarding how he chose the name Desmond, but his biographer Doug Ramsey offers an account from Desmond's friend Hal Strack that the two were listening to the Glenn Miller band singer Johnny Desmond in 1942, and Desmond told Strack, "that's such a great name. It's so smooth and yet it's uncommon. ... If I ever decide I need another name, it's going to be Desmond."

== Career ==
After World War II, Desmond started working in the San Francisco Bay Area as a backing musician. He worked occasionally for Dave Brubeck at the Geary Cellar in San Francisco. For several weeks, he led a small jazz combo at the Band Box in Redwood City that included Brubeck. Desmond had a falling-out with Brubeck when he resigned from the Band Box and prevented Brubeck from taking over the residency. In 1950, Desmond joined the band of Jack Fina and toured with Fina for several months, but he returned to California after hearing Brubeck's trio on the radio and deciding that he should repair his relationship with Brubeck and attempt to join Brubeck's increasingly successful band.

At the time, Brubeck and his wife Iola had three small children, and Brubeck had instructed Iola not to let Desmond set foot in the family home. Desmond appeared at Brubeck's San Francisco apartment one day while Dave was in the backyard hanging diapers on a laundry line, and Iola, defying Brubeck's wishes, let Desmond in and took him to Dave. Desmond offered to perform arranging and administrative work for Brubeck's band and to babysit Brubeck's children, and Brubeck finally relented and agreed to try working with Desmond again.

=== Dave Brubeck Quartet ===
Some people called him the stork—'Cause he would stand on one leg and leaned on the piano. But that ... that was when he was playing great. What used to scare me is I'd look at him and it would just be whites in his eyes, wouldn't be any eyeballs.

— Dave Brubeck
(PBS interview with Hedrick Smith)

Desmond met Dave Brubeck in 1944 in the military. Brubeck was auditioning for the 253rd Army band, to which Desmond belonged. After making the cut, he—unlike Desmond—was sent overseas in 1944, to Europe. Desmond once told Marian McPartland of National Public Radio's Piano Jazz that he was taken aback by the chord changes which Brubeck introduced during that 1944 audition. After Desmond persuaded Brubeck to hire him following his stint with Jack Fina, the two had a contract drafted (of which Brubeck was the sole signatory); the wording forbade Brubeck from firing him, ensured Brubeck's status as group leader, and gave Desmond twenty percent of all profits generated from the quartet. This established the Dave Brubeck Quartet, which lasted from 1951 to December 1967.

The quartet became especially popular with college-age audiences, often performing in college settings, including their ground-breaking 1953 album Jazz at Oberlin at Oberlin College and at the campuses of Ohio University and the University of Michigan. The success of the quartet led to a Time magazine piece on them in 1954, with the famous cover featuring Brubeck's face.

After drummer Joe Dodge decided to leave the group, Joe Morello joined in late 1956, on Desmond's recommendation. Despite this, differences in musical aspirations and taste made their relationship a tense one for many years. Desmond hoped for a "tinky-boom" background-type drummer while Morello wanted to be recognized and featured. During Morello's first performance with the group, he was featured by Brubeck and received an ovation from the audience for his solo. Desmond resented this, and threatened to leave the group. Brubeck managed to keep both Desmond and Morello in the group but with friction between them for years. Desmond's grudge against Morello could also be heard during their performance. In their "Take the 'A' Train" performance in Hanover, Germany, in 1958, for example, Desmond's playing sounded lackluster and uninterested. After a passage of rhythmically complex playing from Morello, Desmond would sometimes play very quietly and or even drop out for a few bars. In their later years, they reconciled and became close friends.

The Dave Brubeck Quartet played until 1967, when Brubeck switched his musical focus from performance to composition and dissolved the group. During the 1970s, Desmond joined Brubeck for several reunion tours, including Two Generations of Brubeck. Accompanying them were Brubeck's sons, Chris Brubeck, Dan Brubeck, and Darius Brubeck. In 1976, Desmond played 25 shows in 25 nights with Brubeck, touring the United States by bus.

=== Other collaborations ===
Playing with Desmond and Mulligan was really mind-blowing because they were such heroes for me.

— Perry Robinson

Desmond worked several times during his career with baritone saxophonist and bandleader Gerry Mulligan. They made two studio albums together (Gerry Mulligan – Paul Desmond Quartet [1957] and Two of a Mind [1962]). In June 1969, Desmond appeared at the New Orleans Jazz Festival with Gerry Mulligan, with favorable reactions from critics and audience members. During Brubeck's Two Generations tours, Desmond and Mulligan shared the stage in 1974. Unlike Brubeck, Mulligan had much in common with Desmond; they were similar in their interests and humor, and both were prone to addiction.

Desmond had a celebrated studio partnership with guitarist Jim Hall. Hall played on several albums recorded by Desmond between 1959 and 1963 for Warner Bros. and RCA Victor. After a period of inactivity, Desmond was asked to play the Half Note in New York City in 1971 by Hall. With his customary wryness, Desmond said that he took the job only because he was nearby and could tumble out of bed to work. The two continued to play at the club to packed audiences. Desmond also joined the Modern Jazz Quartet for a Christmas concert in 1971 at the New York Town Hall.

Desmond was a guest artist on five tracks by Chet Baker recorded between 1975 and 1977. These were released on the albums She Was Too Good to Me (CTI, 1974), You Can't Go Home Again, and The Best Thing for You. Baker and Desmond also appeared together on two tracks included on Jim Hall's 1975 album Concierto.

Desmond met Canadian guitarist Ed Bickert through a recommendation by Jim Hall, and Desmond performed with Bickert at several clubs in the Toronto area during 1974–1975. Desmond featured Bickert on his 1975 studio album Pure Desmond, and the two played together at the 1976 Edmonton Jazz Festival. Live recordings of that concert and club dates with Bickert performed during 1974–1975 were released during and after Desmond's lifetime.

== Personal life ==
Desmond was married from 1947 to 1949 to Duane Reeves Lamon. He never remarried.

In their private lives Dave Brubeck and his family were very close to Paul Desmond, though the two men possessed very different personalities. Darius Brubeck recalled thinking that Desmond was his uncle almost into adolescence. Desmond grew especially close to Dave's son Michael, to whom he left his saxophone upon his death. Desmond was also described as a womanizer who was unable to form (and was uninterested in maintaining) steady relationships with women, though he had no shortage of female companions throughout his life. Desmond is reported to have quipped, upon seeing a former girlfriend on the street, "There she goes, not with a whim but a banker" (a semi-Spoonerism reference to T.S. Eliot's "This is the way the world ends / Not with a bang but a whimper"). In contrast, Brubeck was deeply religious and a stalwart family man.

I have won several prizes as the world's slowest alto player, as well as a special award in 1961 for quietness.

— Paul Desmond

Desmond enjoyed reading works by thinkers of his generation, like Timothy Leary and Jack Kerouac who advocated or relied upon the use of recreational drugs and sometimes used LSD. He had several addictions, including Dewar's Scotch whisky and Pall Mall cigarettes. In the 1940s and 1950s, Desmond frequently took amphetamines, and in the 1970s, he was known to use cocaine. His chemical dependency problems would sometimes drain him of energy on the road. Clarinetist Perry Robinson recalled in his autobiography that Desmond would sometimes need a vitamin B12 shot just to go on playing during his later career.

Pristine, perfect. One of the great livers of our time. Awash in Dewar's and full of health.

— Paul Desmond

Desmond died on May 30, 1977, not of his heavy alcohol habit but of lung cancer, the result of his longtime heavy smoking. He was 52 years old. Never without his humor, after he was diagnosed with cancer, he expressed pleasure at the health of his liver. His last concert was with Brubeck in February 1977, in New York City. His fans were unaware of his rapidly declining health. Desmond specified in his will that all proceeds from "Take Five" would go to the Red Cross following his death. Desmond reportedly owned a Baldwin grand piano, which he lent to Bradley Cunningham, owner of Bradley's piano bar in Greenwich Village, provided that Cunningham move the large piano back to Desmond's Upper West Side apartment to become part of Desmond's estate. After this long and expensive process, Desmond willed the piano to Cunningham, a characteristic and final prank. The Paul Desmond Papers (and other Brubeck adjacent archival collections) are held at the Holt-Atherton Special Collections and Archives in the University of the Pacific Library.

Desmond was cremated and his ashes were scattered.

== Style ==
Desmond produced a light, melodic tone on the alto saxophone, trying to sound, he said, "like a dry martini." With a style that was similar to that of Lee Konitz, one of his influences, he quickly became one of the best-known saxophonists from the West Coast's cool school of jazz. Much of the success of the classic Brubeck quartet was due to the juxtaposition of his airy style over Brubeck's sometimes relatively heavy, polytonal piano work.

Desmond's improvisation is praised for its logical structure and lyricism. His gift for improvised counterpoint is perhaps most evident on his two albums with baritone saxophonist Gerry Mulligan (Gerry Mulligan – Paul Desmond Quartet and Two of a Mind). In his playing, Desmond was also notable for his ability to produce extremely high notes, the altissimo register, on his saxophone.

Desmond played a Selmer Super Balanced Action model alto saxophone with an M. C. Gregory model 4A-18M hard rubber mouthpiece, both dating from circa 1951, with a moderately stiff Rico 3 ½ reed.

== Discography ==
=== With Dave Brubeck ===
Year	Album	Leader	Label
1950	Dave Brubeck Octet	Dave Brubeck	Fantasy 3239
1951	Brubeck/Desmond	Dave Brubeck Quartet	Fantasy 3229
1952	Modern Complex Dialogues [live]	Dave Brubeck	Alto AL-711
1952	Jazz at Storyville	Dave Brubeck	Fantasy 3240
1952	The Dave Brubeck Quartet	Dave Brubeck	Fantasy 3230
1952	Jazz at the Blackhawk	Dave Brubeck	Fantasy 3210
1953	Jazz at Oberlin	Dave Brubeck	Fantasy 3245
1953	The Jackson-Harris Herd/The Dave Brubeck Quartet: Live at the Blue Note, Chicago, March 1953	Dave Brubeck Quartet, Chubby Jackson–Bill Harris Herd	Jazz Band (UK) EB-2140
1953	Brubeck & Desmond at Wilshire-Ebell	Dave Brubeck	Fantasy 3249
1953	Jazz at the College of the Pacific	Dave Brubeck	Fantasy 3223
1953	Jazz at the College of the Pacific, Volume 2	Dave Brubeck	OJC 1076
1954	Dave Brubeck at Storyville 1954	Dave Brubeck	Columbia CL-590
1954	Jazz Goes to College	Dave Brubeck	Columbia CL-566
1954	Brubeck Time	Dave Brubeck	Columbia CL-622
1954	Jazz: Red Hot and Cool [live]	Dave Brubeck	Columbia CL-699
1956, 1957	Dave Brubeck Quartet Live in 1956–57 Featuring Paul Desmond	Dave Brubeck	Jazz Band (UK) EB-2102
1956	Live From Basin Street	Dave Brubeck	Jazz Band (UK) EB-402
1956	Dave Brubeck and Jay & Kai at Newport	Dave Brubeck Quartet, J. J. Johnson–Kai Winding Quintet	Columbia CL-932
1956	Dave Brubeck Featuring Paul Desmond: Live Together	Dave Brubeck	Joker (Italy) SM-3804; Blue Vox (Switzerland) B/90174
1956	Jazz Impressions of the U.S.A.	Dave Brubeck	Columbia CL-984
1957	Re-Union	Dave Brubeck / Paul Desmond / Dave Van Kriedt	Fantasy 3268
1957	Jazz Goes to Junior College	Dave Brubeck	Columbia CL-1034
1957	Dave Digs Disney	Dave Brubeck	Columbia CL-1059
1958	The Dave Brubeck Quartet In Europe	Dave Brubeck	Columbia CL-1168
1958	Newport 1958: Brubeck Plays Ellington	Dave Brubeck	Columbia CL-1249
1958	Jazz Impressions of Eurasia	Dave Brubeck	Columbia CL-1251
1958	The Quartet [live]	Dave Brubeck	Europa Jazz (Italy) EJ-1032; Denon (Japan) 33C38-7681
1959	Gone with the Wind	Dave Brubeck	Columbia CL-1347/CS-8156
1959	Time Out [includes "Take Five"]	Dave Brubeck Quartet	Columbia CL-1397/CS-8192
1959, 1962	St. Louis Blues [live]	Dave Brubeck	Moon (Italy) MLP-028
1959	Southern Scene	Dave Brubeck	Columbia CL-1439/CS-8235
1960	Brubeck and Rushing	Dave Brubeck with Jimmy Rushing	Columbia CL-1553/CS-8353
1960	Bernstein Plays Brubeck Plays Bernstein	Dave Brubeck with Leonard Bernstein and the New York Philharmonic	Columbia CL-1466/CS-8257
1960	Tonight Only!	Dave Brubeck with Carmen McRae	Columbia CL-1609/CS-8409
1961	Time Further Out: Miro Reflections	Dave Brubeck	Columbia CL-1690/CS-8490
1961, 1962	Countdown—Time in Outer Space	Dave Brubeck	Columbia CL-1775/CS-8575
1961	Brandenburg Gate: Revisited	Dave Brubeck	Columbia CL-1963/CS-8763
1961	Take Five Live	Dave Brubeck with Carmen McRae	Columbia CL-2316/CS-9116
1962	Bossa Nova U.S.A.	Dave Brubeck	Columbia CL-1998/CS-8798
1962	Brubeck in Amsterdam	Dave Brubeck	Columbia CS-9897
1963	At Carnegie Hall	Dave Brubeck Quartet	Columbia C2L-26/C2S-826 [as double LP]; CL-2036/CS-8836 and CL-2037/CS-8837 [as single LPs]
1963	Time Changes	Dave Brubeck	Columbia CL-2127/CS-8927
1964	Jazz Impressions of Japan	Dave Brubeck	Columbia CL-2212/CS-9012
1964	Jazz Impressions of New York	Dave Brubeck	Columbia CL-2275/CS-9075
1964	In Concert 1964	Dave Brubeck	Jazz Connoisseur (Israel) JC-003
1964	Dave Brubeck in Berlin	Dave Brubeck	CBS (Germany) 62578
1965	The Canadian Concert of Dave Brubeck	Dave Brubeck	Can-Am (Canada) 1500
1965	Angel Eyes	Dave Brubeck	Columbia CL-2348/CS-9148
1965	My Favorite Things	Dave Brubeck	Columbia CL-2437/CS-9237
1965	Time In	Dave Brubeck	Columbia CL-2512/CS-9312
1966	Dave Brubeck's Greatest Hits [compilation]	Dave Brubeck	Columbia CL-2484/CS-9284
1966	Anything Goes! The Dave Brubeck Quartet Plays Cole Porter	Dave Brubeck	Columbia CL-2602/CS-9402
1966	Jackpot! Recorded Live in Las Vegas	Dave Brubeck	Columbia CL-2712/CS-9512
1967	Bravo! Brubeck! [live]	Dave Brubeck	Columbia CL-2695/CS-9495
1967	Buried Treasures: Recorded Live in Mexico City	Dave Brubeck	Columbia/Legacy CK-65777
1967	Take Five Live	Dave Brubeck	JMY (Italy) 1001
1967	The Last Time We Saw Paris [live]	Dave Brubeck	Columbia CL-2872/CS-9672
1967	Their Last Time Out: The Unreleased Live Concert, December 26, 1967	Dave Brubeck Quartet	Columbia/Legacy 886978156228
1971	Summit Sessions	Dave Brubeck	Columbia C-30522
1972	We're All Together Again for the First Time	Dave Brubeck / Gerry Mulligan / Paul Desmond	Atlantic SD-1641
1975	1975: The Duets	Dave Brubeck / Paul Desmond	Horizon/A&M SP-703
1976	25th Anniversary Reunion	Dave Brubeck Quartet	Horizon/A&M SP-714

=== As bandleader ===
Year	Album	Leader	Label
1954	Desmond (AKA Paul Desmond Quintet With The Bill Bates Singers)	Paul Desmond with Dick Collins and Dave Van Kriedt	Fantasy 3-21
1956	Desmond: Here I AM (AKA The Paul Desmond Quartet Featuring Don Elliott)	Paul Desmond with Don Elliott	Fantasy 3225
1959	First Place Again	Paul Desmond	Warner Bros. WS-1356
1962	Desmond Blue	Paul Desmond with strings	RCA Victor LSP-2438
1962	Late Lament [reissue of Desmond Blue with different cover art, different track running order, plus three previously unreleased tracks from the same sessions]	Paul Desmond	RCA/Bluebird 5778-2-RB
1963	Take Ten	Paul Desmond	RCA Victor LSP-2569
1965	Glad to Be Unhappy	Paul Desmond featuring Jim Hall	RCA Victor LSP-3407
1965	Bossa Antigua	Paul Desmond featuring Jim Hall	RCA Victor LSP-3320
1966	Easy Living	Paul Desmond featuring Jim Hall	RCA Victor LSP-3480
1969	Summertime	Paul Desmond	A&M/CTI SP-3015
1969	From the Hot Afternoon	Paul Desmond	A&M/CTI SP-3024
1970	Bridge over Troubled Water	Paul Desmond	A&M/CTI SP-3032
1974	Skylark	Paul Desmond	CTI 6039
1974	Pure Desmond	Paul Desmond	CTI 6059
1975	Live	Paul Desmond Quartet	Horizon/A&M SP-850
1976	Paul Desmond	Paul Desmond with Ed Bickert	Artists House AH-2
1989	The Complete Recordings of the Paul Desmond Quartet With Jim Hall [posthumous box set]	Paul Desmond with Jim Hall	Mosaic MR6-120
1992	Like Someone in Love [recorded 1975]	Paul Desmond Quartet	Telarc 83319
2020	The Complete 1975 Toronto Recordings- 7 CD box [recorded 1975]	Paul Desmond Quartet	Mosaic MD7-269

=== With Gerry Mulligan ===
Year	Album	Leader	Label
1954	Gerry Mulligan/Paul Desmond [reissues]	Paul Desmond Quintet/Quartet, Gerry Mulligan Quartet	Fantasy 3220
1957	Blues in Time (AKA Gerry Mulligan–Paul Desmond Quartet)	Paul Desmond with Gerry Mulligan	Verve MGV-8246
1962	Two of a Mind	Paul Desmond with Gerry Mulligan	RCA Victor LPM-2624

=== With Chet Baker ===
Year	Album	Leader	Label
1955	Chet Baker Quartet Plus: The Newport Years, Vol. 1 [live]	Chet Baker / Clifford Brown / Gerry Mulligan / Dave Brubeck	Philology (Italy) W-51
1974	She Was Too Good to Me	Chet Baker	CTI 6050
1975	Concierto	Jim Hall / Chet Baker	CTI 6060
1977	You Can't Go Home Again	Chet Baker	Horizon/A&M SP-726
1977	The Best Thing for You	Chet Baker	A&M 0832
1992	Together: The Complete Studio Recordings	Chet Baker / Paul Desmond	Epic 472984 2

=== Other ===
Year	Album	Leader	Label
1951	"How Long, Baby How Long, Pt. 1" // "How Long, Baby How Long, Pt. 2" [78 rpm 10-inch disc]	Jack Sheedy Sextet	Coronet 109
1951	"The Man I Love" // "Down In Honkytonk Town" [78 rpm 10-inch disc]	Jack Sheedy Sextet	Coronet 110
1971	The Only Recorded Performance of Paul Desmond With The Modern Jazz Quartet [live]	Paul Desmond w/ The Modern Jazz Quartet	Finesse/Columbia FW 37487
1972	Time & Love	Jacky and Roy	CTI 6019
1973	Giant Box	Don Sebesky	CTI 6031/32
1975	Concierto	Jim Hall	CTI 6060
1977	Watermark	Art Garfunkel	Columbia JC 34975
1996	Feeling Blue	compilation	Camden/BMG 74321-40055
