= My Favorite Things (Dave Brubeck album) =

Studio album by Dave Brubeck
- Released: 1965
- Recorded: June 11, 1962 – September 22, 1965
- Genre: Jazz
- Length: 42:06
- Label: Columbia
- Producer: Teo Macero

Dave Brubeck chronology
Angel Eyes (1965)	My Favorite Things (1965)	Time In (1966)

My Favorite Things is a 1965 studio album by the Dave Brubeck Quartet, of music by Richard Rodgers. The album peaked at 133 on the Billboard 200. The cover features a photo of model Terry Reno, who also appeared on the cover of Change Eyes (Dave Drubeck Album).

== Reception ==
Professional ratings
Review scores
Source	Rating
Allmusic	2.5/5 stars

The album was reviewed by Scott Yanow at Allmusic who wrote that despite being recorded in session three years apart, the music "...has a strong unity about it due to the consistent performances of the veteran group". Yanow also wrote that "The Rodgers songs are treated with respect and swing. This comparatively gentle version of "My Favorite Things" would never be mistaken for John Coltrane's."

== Track listing ==
All music composed by Richard Rodgers, lyricists indicated

1. "My Favorite Things" (Oscar Hammerstein II) - 2:57
2. "Over and Over Again" (Lorenz Hart) - 4:07
3. "Why Can't I?" (Hart) - 6:58
4. "Little Girl Blue" (Hart) - 5:35
5. "This Can't Be Love" (Hart) - 6:57
6. "My Romance" (Hart) - 6:55
7. "The Circus on Parade" (Hart) - 3:19
8. "The Most Beautiful Girl in the World" (Hart) - 5:18

== Personnel ==
- Dave Brubeck - piano
- Paul Desmond - alto saxophone
- Gene Wright - double bass
- Joe Morello - drums
- Teo Macero - producer
