= Summertime (Paul Desmond album) =

Studio album by Paul Desmond
- Released: March/April 1969
- Recorded: October 10, 16 and 24, 1968; November 5 and 20, 1968; December 26, 1968
- Studio: Van Gelder Studio, Englewood Cliffs, NJ
- Genre: Jazz, bossa nova
- Length: 40:05
- Label: A&M/CTI; SP 3015
- Producer: Creed Taylor

Paul Desmond chronology
Easy Living (1966)	Summertime (1969)	From the Hot Afternoon (1969)

Summertime is a 1969 album by American jazz saxophonist Paul Desmond featuring performances recorded in 1968 and released on the CTI label.

== Reception ==
Professional ratings
Review scores
Source	Rating
AllMusic	4.5/5 stars

AllMusic reviewer Richard S. Ginell states "The result is a beautifully produced, eclectic album of music that revives Desmond's "bossa antigua" idea and sends it in different directions, directly toward Brazil and various Caribbean regions, as well as back to the jazzy States... Never before had Desmond's alto been recorded so ravishingly".

== Track listing ==
1. "Samba (Struttin') With Some Barbeque" (Lil Hardin Armstrong, Don Raye) - 4:26
2. "Olvidar" (Don Sebesky) - 5:33
3. "Ob-La-Di, Ob-La-Da" (John Lennon, Paul McCartney) - 2:12
4. "Emily" (Johnny Mandel, Johnny Mercer) - 4:45
5. "Someday My Prince Will Come" (Larry Morey, Frank Churchill) - 3:07
6. "Autumn Leaves" (Joseph Kosma, Johnny Mercer) - 3:00
7. "Where Is Love?" (Lionel Bart) - 5:30
8. "Lady in Cement" (Hugo Montenegro) - 3:08
9. "North by Northeast" (Paul Desmond) - 4:30
10. "Summertime" (George Gershwin, DuBose Heyward) - 3:54
- Recorded at Van Gelder Studio in Englewood Cliffs, New Jersey on October 10 (tracks 7 & 10), October 16 (tracks 4 & 9), October 24 (tracks 2 & 5), November 5 (track 8), November 20 (tracks 1 & 6), and December 26 (track 3), 1968.

== Personnel ==
- Paul Desmond - alto saxophone
- Wayne Andre (1, 2, 4–6, 9), Paul Faulise (1, 2, 4–6, 8–10), Urbie Green (2, 4, 5, 8–10), J. J. Johnson (7, 8, 10), Bill Watrous (1, 2, 4–6, 9, 10), Kai Winding (1, 2, 4–6, 8–10) - trombone
- Burt Collins (2–5, 8–10), John Eckert (1, 2, 4–6, 9), Joe Shepley, Marvin Stamm (1, 2, 4–6, 8–10) - trumpet, flugelhorn
- Ray Alonge (1, 2, 4–6, 8–10), Jimmy Buffington (2, 4, 5, 8–10), Tony Miranda (1, 2, 4–6, 9) - French horn
- George Marge (3) - flute, oboe
- Bob Tricarico (3) - flute, bassoon
- Herbie Hancock (1, 2, 4–6, 8–10) - piano
- Jay Berliner (7, 8, 10), Joe Beck (5), Eumir Deodato (8), Bucky Pizzarelli (2, 5) - guitar
- Frank Bruno (3), Ron Carter (1, 2, 4–6, 8–10) - bass
- Leo Morris (2, 4, 5, 9, 10) - drums
- Mike Mainieri (7, 8, 10) - vibraphone
- Joe Venuto (3) - marimba
- Jack Jennings (7, 8, 10), Airto Moreira (7, 8, 10) - percussion
- Don Sebesky - arranger
