= First Place Again =

Studio album by Paul Desmond
- Released: 1959
- Recorded: September 5–7, 1959; New York City
- Genre: Jazz
- Length: 45:58
- Label: Warner Bros. W 1356
- Producer: Bob Prince

Paul Desmond chronology
First Place Again (1959)	Desmond Blue (1962)

First Place Again is the second album led by American jazz saxophonist Paul Desmond. The album was recorded in September 1959 and released on the Warner Bros. label. It was the first of five studio albums Desmond recorded with quartets that included guitarist Jim Hall and drummer Connie Kay. Percy Heath, who was Kay's bandmate from the Modern Jazz Quartet, completed the quartet for this album. For most of August 1959, Hall, Heath, and Kay had been faculty members at the Lenox School of Jazz music workshop. During that same month, Desmond finished recording Time Out with the Dave Brubeck Quartet.

== Reception ==
Professional ratings
Review scores
Source	Rating
Allmusic	3.5/5 stars
The Penguin Guide to Jazz Recordings	3/4 stars

Allmusic awarded the album 3½ stars stating "Desmond, of course, being at that time the king of melodic improvisation on the alto – with the possible exception of Art Pepper's ascendancy – is in fine form. His whimsical, breathy, dry tone is sharp, on the spot, and full of ideas as he quotes from a vast number of tunes. This is a thoroughly enjoyable and relaxed set if ultimately unmemorable".

== Track listing ==
1. "I Get a Kick Out of You" (Cole Porter) – 8:38
2. "For All We Know" (J. Fred Coots, Sam M. Lewis) – 5:33
3. "Two Degrees East, Three Degrees West" (John Lewis) – 7:28
4. "Greensleeves" (Traditional) – 2:05
5. "You Go to My Head" (Coots, Haven Gillespie) – 6:27
6. "East of the Sun (and West of the Moon)" (Brooks Bowman) – 5:45
7. "Time After Time" (Jule Styne, Sammy Cahn) – 6:13
8. "Susie" (Paul Desmond) – 3:49 Bonus track on CD reissue

== Personnel ==
- Paul Desmond – alto saxophone
- Jim Hall – guitar
- Percy Heath – bass
- Connie Kay – drums
