= Transit (Seghers novel) =

1944 novel by Anna Seghers

- First edition
- Author: Anna Seghers
- Language: German
- Published: 1944
- Publisher: Weller, Konstanz

Transit is a novel by the German writer Anna Seghers. Set in Vichy, France during the German occupation, it follows an unnamed narrator, who has escaped a concentration camp, waiting on the paperwork to flee the country. It has been described as an "existential, political, literary thriller" about storytelling, boredom and exile.

== Plot ==
The novel takes place in France during World War II after the German invasion and occupation of the north. The twenty-seven year-old unnamed narrator has escaped from a Nazi concentration camp and is traveling from Rouen. Along the way to Marseilles, where he hopes to get passage on a ship to leave the country, he meets a friend, Paul. Paul asks the narrator to deliver a letter to a writer named Weidel in Paris. When the narrator tries to do this, he learns that Weidel has committed suicide. The narrator also finds that Weidel left behind a suitcase full of letters and an unfinished manuscript for a novel, which he takes with him.

Arriving in Marseilles, the narrator describes the chaos of a town full of people from across Europe who are desperate to escape the Nazis. Most of his time is spent in cafes, where he begins to recognize people who are also waiting, while the city has ever more limited amounts of food and alcohol on sale because of the increased population. A mystery woman who haunts the cafes is Weidel's estranged wife, desperate for his help to leave France. She doesn't know Weidel is dead. The narrator falls in love with her and tries to arrange matters so she can leave with him, without her knowing that he has assumed Weidel's identity (in order to use his visa and Mexican visa).

Throughout the novel, the narrator talks with several other refugees, sharing stories and experiences along the way. The story draws on Seghers's own experience in wartime France.

== Publication ==
Transit was originally written in German, but published in English with translation done by James Austin Galston. It has since been translated into other languages.

It was published by the New York Review of Books in 2013 in a new English translation by Margot Bettauer Dembo, as part of its Classics program.

== Reception ==
Transit received mixed reactions, particularly regarding its portrayal of refugees. While some reviewers acknowledged the inherent tragedy of Seghers' subject matter, others found her depiction of the protagonist less sympathetic than expected for a war refugee. For example, Helen Bower, writing for the Detroit Free Press on May 14, 1944, expressed detachment, noting that although "the refugees pouring a floodtide into Marseille is tragic and moving of itself," the author's style left her "personally, cold."

Henry Miller, in his Town & Country review (August 1945), echoed a similar sentiment. He argued that "the sympathy one has for the countless, nameless refugees is diverted from him," suggesting that the protagonist's plight was as much a result of "his own stupidity and inertia" as it was of the war itself.

Milton Merlin of the Los Angeles Times offered a more positive take, comparing Transit to H.E. Bates’ Fair Stood the Wind for France. He described Seghers' work as "the story of the uprooted millions in frantic migration" and found the narrative effective in capturing the chaotic displacement of refugees during the war. Miller, however, offered a more complex view in his Town & Country review, interpreting Transit as a reflection of the "disregard for the dignity of life" seen in both war and peace. While admiring its themes, Miller ultimately critiqued the novel as "too expertly done," and compared the protagonist to the detached figure in Arthur Koestler’s works.

=== Comparison to other works by Anna Seghers ===
Critics also compared Transit to Seghers’ other works, particularly her previous novel, The Seventh Cross. Harry Hansen, in Red Book (July 1944), found Transit "a moving one" but felt it did not reach the same literary heights as The Seventh Cross. William Du Bois of the New York Times was less favorable, stating that readers who appreciated The Seventh Cross might find themselves "let down" by Transit. He described Seghers' characters as "symbols, not men," attributing a "Teutonic mooniness" to her narrative style that detracted from its emotional impact.

== Bibliography ==
- Transit. Translated by Galston, James Austin. Little, Brown. 1944.
- Transit. Translated by Dembo, Margot Bettauer. New York: New York Review Books. 2013. ISBN 9781590176252.
- Rotten Tomatoes. (2018). Transit (2018). https://www.rottentomatoes.com/m/transit_2018
- Dargis, M. (2019, February 28). Transit Review. The New York Times. https://www.nytimes.com/2019/02/28/movies/transit-review.html
- Bradshaw, P. (2019, August 14). Transit Review. The Guardian. https://www.theguardian.com/film/2019/aug/14/transit-review-christian-petzold-franz-rogowski
- IMDb. (n.d.). Christian Petzold Biography. https://www.imdb.com/name/nm0678857/bio/?ref_=nm_ov_bio_sm
- IMDb. (n.d.). Transit Awards Summary. https://www.imdb.com/title/tt6675244/awards/
- The Numbers. (n.d.). Transit Financial Summary. https://www.the-numbers.com/movie/Transit-(Germany)-(2018)#tab=summary
- Anne Frank Foundation. (1947). Publication of Anne’s Diary (1947). https://www.annefrank.org/annes-wereld/en/anne-frank/1947-annes-diary-published</
- Ubiquitous Books Blog. (2023, March 25). If This Is a Man Analysis. https://ubiquitousbooks.wordpress.com/2023/03/25/if-this-is-a-man/
- Bower, H. (1944, May 14) The Book Rack. Detroit Free Press.
- Miller, H. (1945, August). Wartime Literature in English. Town & Country.
- Merlin, M. .(1944, May 28) Fugitives from Nazis Entrapped. Los Angeles Times, p. C4.
- Hansen, H. (1944, July). Book Suggestions for July. Red Book, 83(3), 41.
- Du Bois, W. (1944, May 14). A Refugee with a Visa to Nowhere. New York Times, Anna Seghers Society.
- Romero, C. Z. (2021, July 5). The Shalvi/Hyman Encyclopedia of Jewish Women. Jewish Women’s Archive. https://jwa.org/encyclopedia/article/seghers-anna
- New York Review Books. (2024). Anna Seghers. https://www.nyrb.com/collections/anna-seghers
- Akademie der Kunste. (2021, August 10). Life. https://www.adk.de/en/archives/museums/anna-seghers-museum/life.htm
- Fehervary, Helen. Anna Seghers: The Mythic Dimension. Ann Arbor: University of Michigan Press, 2001. ISBN 0-472-11215-5 (Fehervary, 2001).
- Cernyak, S. E. (1982). Anna Seghers: Between Judaism and Communism. In J. M. SPALEK & R. F. BELL (Eds.), Exile: The Writer’s Experience (Vol. 99, pp. 278–285). University of North Carolina Press. http://www.jstor.org/stable/10.5149/9781469658421_spalek.24
- Jennings, E. T. (2018). Escape from Vichy: The refugee exodus to the French Caribbean. Harvard University Press.
- Fehervary, H., Zehl Romero, I., & Kepple Strawser, L. (Eds.). (2017). Anna Seghers: The challenge of history. Brill.
- Janzen, M. (2018). Writing to change the world: Anna Seghers, authorship, and international solidarity in the twentieth century. Camden House.
- German Resistance Memorial Center. (n.d.). Anna Seghers. Retrieved November 2, 2024, from https://www.gdwberlin.de/en/recess/biographies/index_of_persons/biographie/view-bio/anna-seghers/
- Künste im Exil. (n.d.). Writers' Congress in Defense of Culture, 1935. Retrieved November 1, 2024, from https://kuenste-im-exil.de/KIE/Content/EN/Topics/schriftstellerkongress-en.html (https://kuenste-im-exil.de/KIE/Content/EN/Topics/schriftstellerkongress-en.html)
