= Matt Dennis =

American musician and songwriter (1914–2002)

Background information
- Born: Matthew Loveland Dennis; February 11, 1914; Seattle, Washington, U.S.
- Died: June 21, 2002 (aged 88) Riverside, California, U.S.
- Genre: Popular music
- Occupations: Singer, composer
- Instrument: Piano
- Label: Capitol

Matthew Loveland Dennis (February 11, 1914 – June 21, 2002) was an American singer, pianist, band leader, arranger, and writer of music for popular songs.

== Early years ==
Dennis was born in Seattle, Washington, United States. His mother, Leila Loveland, was a violinist and his father, also named Matt Dennis, was an Irish tenor, and the family was in vaudeville, so he was exposed to music early. After his father's death when Dennis was 6 years old, his mother and he went to live with her parents in northern California. When he was able to sit on a stool, they began teaching him to play piano. His mother sang with local dance bands, and he usually accompanied her to the performances. He attended Tamalpais High School.

== Career ==
In 1933 he joined Horace Heidt's orchestra as a vocalist and pianist. Later on, he formed his own band, with Dick Haymes as vocalist. He became vocal coach, arranger, and accompanist for Martha Tilton, and worked with a new vocal group, The Stafford Sisters. Jo Stafford, one of the sisters, joined the Tommy Dorsey band in 1938 and persuaded Dorsey to hire Dennis as arranger and composer. Dennis wrote prolifically, with 14 of his songs recorded by the Dorsey band in one year alone, including "Everything Happens to Me", an early hit for Frank Sinatra.

After four years in the United States Air Force in World War II, Dennis returned to music writing and arranging, getting a boost from his old friend Dick Haymes, who hired him to be the music director for his radio program. With lyricist Tom Adair he wrote songs for Haymes' program.

Dennis made six albums, which were out of print for many years; however, his 1953 song "Angel Eyes" (with lyricist Earl Brent) has become a frequently recorded jazz standard; less frequently recorded, but notably by Miles Davis and Sonny Rollins is "Will You Still Be Mine". Pianist Dave Brubeck and his quartet recorded an entire album of Dennis's compositions, released as Angel Eyes in 1965.

In 2012, Jasmine Records re-released four of Dennis' records as "Welcome Matt". The collection included "Plays and Sings Matt Dennis", a 1958 live performance by Dennis' piano trio, of twelve tunes that Dennis had co-authored.

== Personal life and death ==
Dennis was married to Virginia Maxey, who sang with big bands. They had three children. He died in Riverside, California, at the age of 88.

== Songs with music by Matt Dennis ==
- "Angel Eyes"
- "Compared to You"
- "Everything Happens to Me"
- "It Wasn't the Stars"
- "Junior and Julie"
- "Let's Get Away from It All"
- "Little Man with a Candy Cigar"
- "Love Turns Winter to Spring"
- "Show Me the Way to Get Out of This World"
- "The Night We Called It a Day"
- "Violets for Your Furs"
- "Will You Still Be Mine"

== Television ==
In 1955 he was the host of a summer music series on NBC. The 15-minute show aired at 7:30 pm on Mondays, Wednesdays and Fridays, from June 27 to August 29 of that year. The shows often featured his hit songs.
