= We're All Together Again for the First Time =

Live album by Dave Brubeck
- Released: 1973
- Recorded: October 26 (Olympia, Paris), October 28 (De Doelen, Rotterdam), November 4 (Philharmonie, Berlin) 1972
- Genre: Jazz
- Length: 47:15
- Label: Atlantic - SD 1641
- Producer: Dave Brubeck, Siegfried Loch

Dave Brubeck chronology
Truth Is Fallen (1973)	We're All Together Again for the First Time (1973)	Two Generations of Brubeck (1974)

We're All Together Again for the First Time is a 1973 live album by Dave Brubeck and his quintet recorded at various locations in Europe. The album peaked at 20 on the Billboard Top Jazz Charts.

"Truth", "Unfinished Woman" and "Take Five" were recorded at the Berliner Philharmonie, "Koto Song" was recorded at the Paris Olympia and "Rotterdam Blues" and "Sweet Georgia Brown" at the De Doelen concert hall in Rotterdam.

== Reception ==
Professional ratings
Review scores
Source	Rating
Allmusic	4/5 stars
The Penguin Guide to Jazz Recordings	3/4 stars

The album was reviewed by Scott Yanow at Allmusic who wrote that "For this very logical record, altoist Paul Desmond....makes the group a quintet and his interplay with Mulligan is consistently delightful. ...In addition, Desmond is showcased on "Koto Song" and as an encore Brubeck plays a lighthearted if brief "Sweet Georgia Brown." ."

== Track listing ==
1. "Truth" (Dave Brubeck) - 10:29
2. "Unfinished Woman" (Gerry Mulligan) - 7:26
3. "Koto Song" (Brubeck) - 5:10
4. "Take Five" (Paul Desmond) - 16:07
5. "Rotterdam Blues" (Brubeck) - 6:51
6. "Sweet Georgia Brown" (Ben Bernie, Kenneth Casey, Maceo Pinkard) - 1:12

== Personnel ==
- Dave Brubeck - piano, producer
- Paul Desmond - alto saxophone
- Gerry Mulligan - baritone saxophone
- Jack Six - double bass
- Alan Dawson - drums
- Siegfried Loch - producer
