= From the Hot Afternoon =

Studio album by Paul Desmond
- Released: December 1969/early 1970
- Recorded: June 24–25 & August 13–14, 1969
- Studios: Van Gelder Studio, Englewood Cliffs, NJ
- Genres: Jazz, bossa nova
- Length: 57:12; Reissue with bonus tracks
- Labels: A&M/CTI; SP 3024
- Producer: Creed Taylor

Paul Desmond chronology
Summertime (1968)	From the Hot Afternoon (1969)	Bridge Over Troubled Water (1970)

From the Hot Afternoon is an album by American jazz saxophonist Paul Desmond featuring performances recorded in 1969 and released on the CTI label.

== Track listing ==
1. "October (Outubro)" - (Fernando Brant, Milton Nascimento) - 3:00
2. "Round N' Round (Gira Girou)" (Nascimento) - 4:32
3. "Faithful Brother (Irmão de Fé)" (Nascimento) - 3:09
4. "To Say Goodbye" (Edu Lobo) - 4:01
5. "From the Hot Afternoon" (Nascimento) - 3:31
6. "Circles" (Lobo) - 3:46
7. "Martha & Romao" (Lobo) - 3:05
8. "Catavento" (Nascimento) - 2:46
9. "Canto Latino (Latin Chant)" (Nascimento) - 4:25
10. "Crystal Illusions" (Johnny Guarnieri, Lani Hall, Lobo) - 4:41
11. "Gira Girou (Round 'n' Round)" [alternate take] (Nascimento) - 4:21 Bonus track on CD reissue
12. "Faithful Brother (Irmão de Fé)" [alternate take] (Nascimento) - 2:49 Bonus track on CD reissue
13. "From the Hot Afternoon" [alternate take] (Nascimento) - 3:56 Bonus track on CD reissue
14. "Catavento" [alternate take] (Nascimento) - 2:31 Bonus track on CD reissue
15. "Canto Latino (Latin Chant)" [alternate take] (Nascimento) - 4:01 Bonus track on CD reissue
16. "From the Hot Afternoon" [alternate take 2] (Nascimento) - 2:38 Bonus track on CD reissue
- Recorded at Van Gelder Studio in Englewood Cliffs, New Jersey on June 24 (tracks 1 & 5–7), June 25 (tracks 3, 4, 10 & 12), August 13 (tracks 5, 13 & 16), and August 14 (tracks 2, 8, 9, 11, 14 & 15), 1969

== Personnel ==
- Paul Desmond - alto saxophone
- Edu Lobo - guitar
- Dorio Ferreira - guitar
- Ron Carter - bass
- Airto Moreira - drums, percussion
- Marky Markowitz, Marvin Stamm - trumpet, flugelhorn
- Paul Faulise - bass trombone
- James Buffington - French horn
- Phil Bodner, George Marge - saxophone, clarinet, oboe
- Don Hammond, Hubert Laws - flute, alto flute
- Stan Webb Jr. - flute, alto flute, percussion
- Pat Rebillot - electric piano, keyboards
- Jack Jennings - percussion
- Lewis Eley, Paul Gershman, George Ockner, Eugene Orloff, Raoul Poliakin, Max Pollikoff, Matthew Raimondi, Sylvan Shulman, Avram Weiss - violin
- Charles McCracken, George Ricci - cello
- Margaret Ross - harp
- Wanda de Sah, Edu Lobo - vocal
- Don Sebesky - arranger

=== Production ===
- Creed Taylor - producer
- Rudy Van Gelder - engineer
- Pete Turner - photography

== Reception ==
Professional ratings
Review scores
Source	Rating
AllMusic	4.5/5 stars
The Penguin Guide to Jazz Recordings	3/4 stars

AllMusic reviewer Richard S. Ginell states "Paul Desmond's first genuine all-Brazilian album under the Creed Taylor signature was a beauty".
