= The Seventh Cross =

1942 novel by Anna Seghers

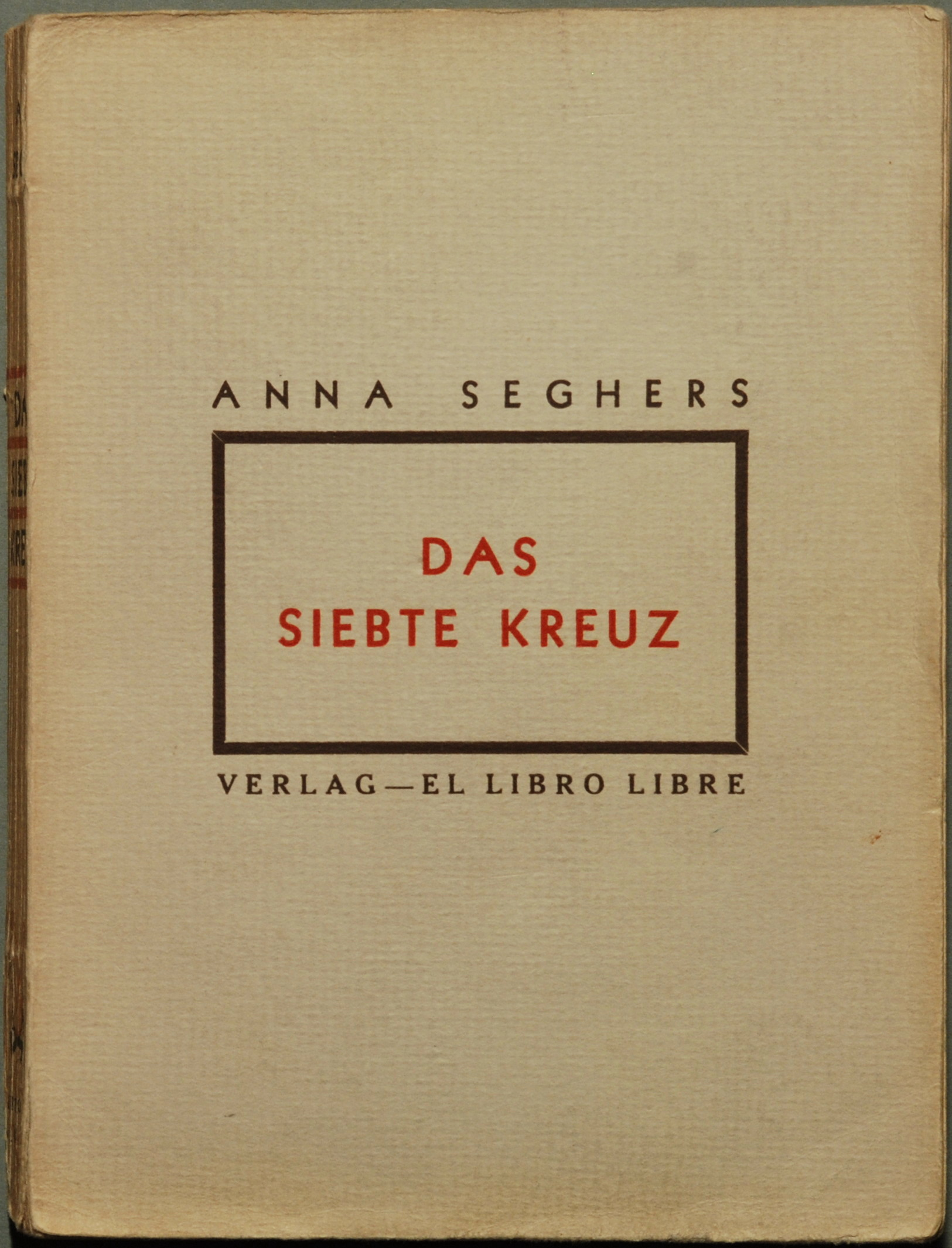
- First edition
- Author: Anna Seghers
- Original title: Das siebte Kreuz
- Language: German
- Published: 1942
- Publisher: El Libro Libre
- OCLC: 295393

The Seventh Cross (German: Das siebte Kreuz) is a novel by Anna Seghers, one of the better-known examples of German literature circa World War II. It was first published in Mexico by El Libro Libre In 1942. The English translation came out in the United States, in an abridged version, in September of the same year (published by Little, Brown and Company). The first full English translation, by Margot Bettauer Dembo, was published in 2018.

== Plot summary ==
Seven men imprisoned in the fictitious Westhofen camp (based partly on the real Osthofen concentration camp) have decided to make a collaborative escape attempt. The main character is a Communist, George Heisler; the narrative follows his path across the countryside, taking refuge with those few who are willing to risk a visit from the Gestapo, while the rest of the escapees are gradually overtaken by their hunters.

The title of the book comes from a conceit of the prison camp. The current officer in charge has ordered the creation of seven crosses from the trees nearby, to be used when the prisoners are returned – not for crucifixion, but a subtler torture: the escapees are made to stand all day in front of their crosses, and will be punished if they falter.

== Reception ==
Publication of the novel was surrounded by a certain amount of fanfare; by the end of September, there were already plans for a comic strip version of The Seventh Cross, it having already been selected as a Book-of-the-Month Club book.

According to Dorothy Rosenberg, who wrote the afterword for the 1987 Monthly Review Press edition, statistics indicate that 319,000 copies of The Seventh Cross were sold in the first twelve days alone, and the novel was printed in German, Russian, Portuguese, Yiddish and Spanish by 1943.

After the end of the Nazi regime, the book was well received in Germany, and particularly in the East; the author, Seghers, was known to be a Communist, and some of the "heroic" or sympathetic characters in The Seventh Cross are also members of the Communist Party.

== Adaptations ==
A film version starring Spencer Tracy and produced by Metro-Goldwyn-Mayer premiered in 1944; a publicity stunt, in which MGM organized a pretend "manhunt" for a Tracy look-alike in seven cities for the public to take part in, accompanied the normal film promotions.

The libretto of German composer Hans Werner Henze's Ninth Symphony is based on The Seventh Cross.
