= Anna Seghers =

German writer (1900–1983)

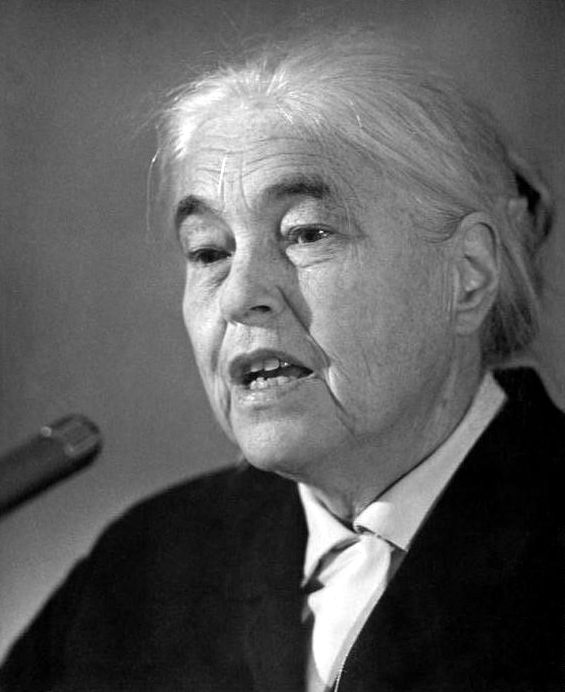
- Anna Seghers (1966)
- Born: Anna (Netty) Reiling; 19 November 1900; Mainz, German Empire
- Died: 1 June 1983 (aged 82); East Berlin, East Germany
- Occupation: Writer
- Spouse: László Radványi (m. 1925)
- Writing career
- Notable works: The Seventh Cross, Transit

Anna Reiling, known by the pen name Anna Seghers (German: [ˈana ˈzeːɡɛʁs], 19 November 1900 – 1 June 1983), was a German writer. She was notable for exploring and depicting the moral experience of the Second World War. Born into a Jewish family and married to a Hungarian Communist, Seghers escaped Nazi-controlled territory through wartime France. She was granted a visa and gained ship's passage to Mexico, where she lived in Mexico City (1941–47).

She returned to Europe after the war, living in West Berlin (1947–50), which was occupied by Allied forces. She eventually settled in the German Democratic Republic (GDR), where she worked on cultural and peace issues. She received numerous awards and was nominated for the Nobel Prize in Literature in 1959, 1967, 1968, 1969 and 1972.

Reiling's pseudonym is believed to be based on the surname of the Dutch painter and printmaker Hercules Pieterszoon Seghers or Segers (c. 1589 – c. 1638).

== Life ==
Seghers was born Anna Reiling in Mainz in 1900 into a Jewish family. She was called "Netty". Her father, Isidor Reiling, was a dealer in antiques and cultural artefacts. From 1920 to 1924, she studied history, art history, and sinology at the universities of Cologne and Heidelberg. In 1924, she completed her studies at the University of Heidelberg under the name Netty Reiling with a doctoral thesis on Jews and Judaism in the work of Rembrandt (Jude und Judentum im Werke Rembrandts), in which she analyzed how Rembrandt did not merely use Judaism as a historical backdrop but endowed the Jewish element with genuine intrinsic value and inner depth within his pictorial compositions — standing in stark contrast to the antisemitic or stereotypical iconography of many of his contemporaries.

In 1925 she married László Radványi, also known as Johann-Lorenz Schmidt, a Hungarian Communist and academic, thereby acquiring Hungarian citizenship.

She joined the Communist Party of Germany in 1928. Her 1932 novel, Die Gefährten was a prophetic warning of the dangers of Nazism, for which she was arrested by the Gestapo. In 1932, she formally left the Jewish community. Her book, Revolt of the Fishermen of Santa Barbara, was banned and burned by the Nazi regime in 1933.

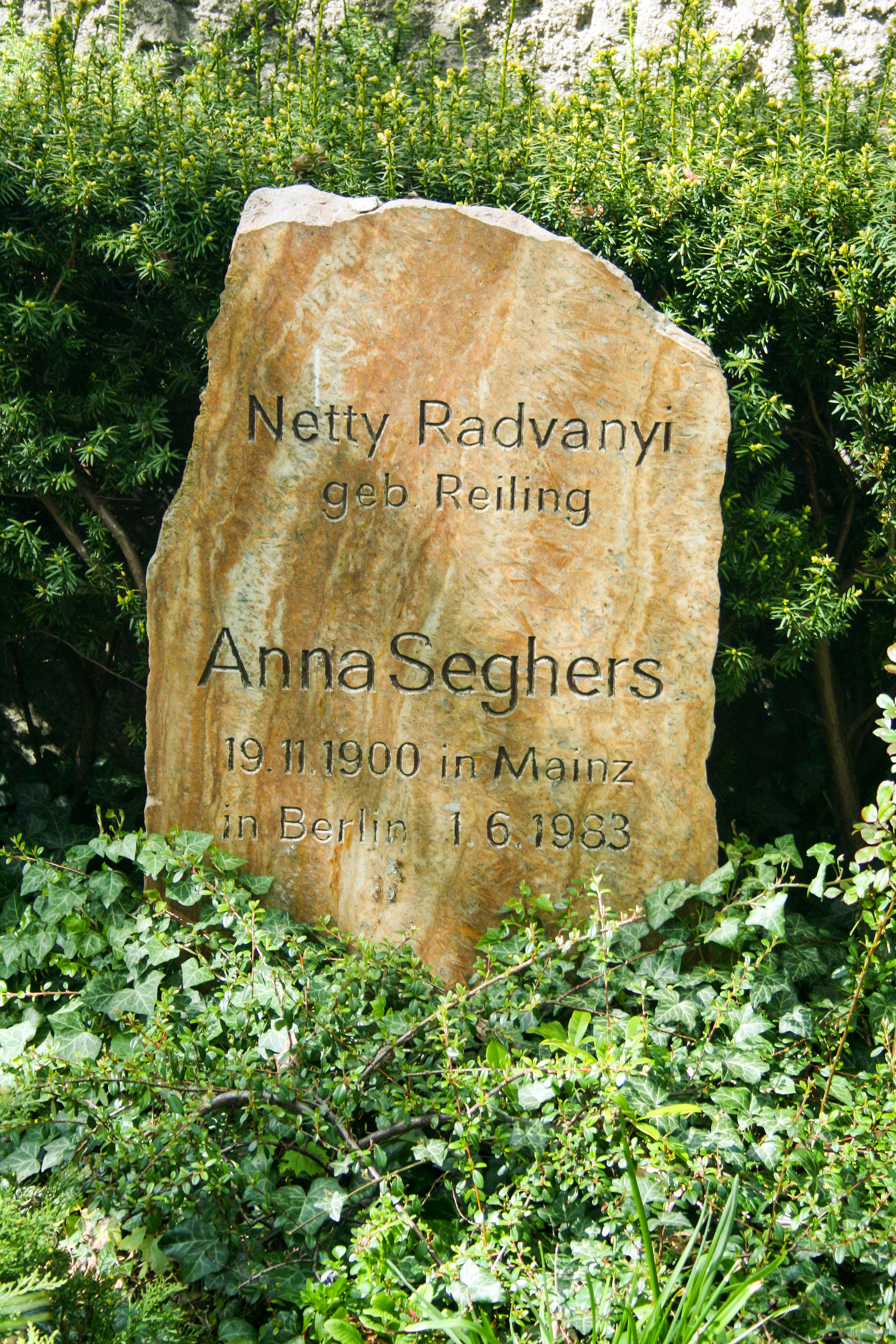
Grave of Anna Seghers in Berlin

By 1934 she had emigrated, via Zürich, to Paris. After German troops invaded the French Third Republic in 1940, she fled to Marseilles, seeking to leave Europe. Her 1944 novel, Transit follows the travails of a fictional character in Marseilles seeking to emigrate.

One year later, she was granted an entry visa to Mexico and ship's passage. She took a ship from Marseille to Martinique. Settling in Mexico City, she founded the anti-fascist 'Heinrich-Heine-Klub', named after the German Jewish poet Heinrich Heine. She also founded Freies Deutschland (Free Germany), an academic journal.

While still in Paris, in 1939, she had written The Seventh Cross. The anti-fascist novel is set in 1936 and describes the escape of seven political prisoners from a Nazi concentration camp in Germany. It was published in English in the United States in 1942 and quickly adapted for an American movie of the same name featuring Spencer Tracy with the screenplay by Helen Deutsch and direction by Fred Zinnemann. The Seventh Cross was one of the very few depictions of Nazi concentration camps, in either literature or the cinema, during World War II. In 1947 Seghers was awarded the Georg Büchner-Prize for this novel.

Seghers's best-known short story, the title of her collection in The Outing of the Dead Girls (1946), was written in Mexico. It was partially autobiographical, drawn from her reminiscence and reimagining of a pre-World War I class excursion on the Rhine river. She explores the actions of the protagonist's classmates in light of their decisions and ultimate fates during both world wars. In describing them, the German countryside, and her hometown Mainz, which was soon destroyed in the second war, Seghers expresses lost innocence and ponders the senseless injustices of war. She shows there is no escape from such loss, whether or not one sympathized with the Nazi Party. Other notable Seghers novels include Sagen von Artemis (1938) and The Ship of the Argonauts (1953), both based on myths.

In 1947, Seghers returned to Germany, settling in West Berlin, an enclave within the Soviet controlled Germany. She joined the Socialist Unity Party of Germany in the zone occupied by the Soviets. That year she was also awarded the Georg Büchner Prize for her novel Transit, written in German, and published in English in 1944. Her return to Germany was positively received with the writer Jan Petersen hailing her work as profound and insightful in the revived literature journal Die Weltbühne.

In 1950, she moved to East Berlin, where she co-founded the Akademie der Künste der DDR, and became a member of the World Peace Council.

Her radio play The Trial of Joan of Arc at Rouen, 1431 was adapted to the stage by Bertolt Brecht. It was written in collaboration with Benno Besson and premiered at the Berliner Ensemble in November 1952, in a production directed by Besson (his first important production with the Ensemble), with Käthe Reichel as Joan.

== Honors and awards ==
In 1951, Seghers received the first National Prize of the GDR and the Stalin Peace Prize. She received an honorary doctorate from the University of Jena in 1959. Seghers was nominated for the 1967 Nobel Prize in Literature by the German Academy of Arts. In 1981, she was made an honorary citizen of her native town Mainz. She died in Berlin on 1 June 1983 and is buried there.

== Representation in other media ==
- The Seventh Cross (1944) was adapted in English from her 1942 novel of the same name and released by MGM, starring Spencer Tracy.
- Anna Seghers is mentioned in the German ostalgie film, Good Bye, Lenin! (2003), directed by Wolfgang Becker.
- Her novel published as Transit (1944) in English, set in Marseilles, was adapted for a 2018 film of the same name by German director Christian Petzold. It was set in contemporary Marseilles, again a center of refugees.

== Selected works ==
Anna Seghers's earlier works are typically attributed to the New Objectivity movement. She also made a number of important contributions to Exilliteratur, including her novels Transit and The Seventh Cross. Her later novels, published in the GDR, are often associated with socialist realism. A number of her novels have been adapted into films in Germany. In 2021, a collection of her short stories was published in English by NYRB Classics.

- 1924 - Jude und Judentum im Werke Rembrandts (PhD thesis, University of Heidelberg)
- 1928 – Aufstand der Fischer von St. Barbara – Revolt of the Fishermen of Santa Barbara (novel)
- 1932 - Die Gefährten - The Companions (novel)
- 1933 – Der Kopflohn – A Price on His Head (novel)
- 1939 – Das siebte Kreuz – The Seventh Cross (novel)
- 1943 – Der Ausflug der toten Mädchen – "The Excursion of the Dead Girls" (story) (in German Women Writers of the Twentieth Century, Pergamon Press, 1978)
- 1944 - Transit – Transit (novel)
- 1946 - Die Saboteure – The Saboteurs (1946)
- 1949 - Die Toten bleiben jung – The Dead Stay Young (novel)
- 1949 - Die Hochzeit von Haiti (short story) "The Wedding from Haiti"
- 1950 - Die Linie.
- 1950 - Der Kesselflicker "The Tinker" (short story)
- 1951 - Crisanta (novella)
- 1951 - Die Kinder.
- 1952 - Der Mann und sein Name (novella)
- 1953 - Der Bienenstock "The Beehive" (short story)
- 1954 - Gedanken zur DDR. In Aufsätze ... 1980, as an excerpt from Andreas Lixl-Purcell (ed.): Erinnerungen deutsch-jüdischer Frauen 1900–1990.
- 1958 - Brot und Salz "Bread and Salt" (short story)
- 1959 - Die Entscheidung "The Decision" (novel)
- 1961 - Das Licht auf dem Galgen "The Light on the Gallows" (short story)
- 1963 - Über Tolstoi. Über Dostojewski.
- 1965 - Die Kraft der Schwachen The Power of the Weak (novel)
- 1967 - Das wirkliche Blau. Eine Geschichte aus Mexiko. "The Real Blue" (short story)
- 1968 - Das Vertrauen Trust (novel)
- 1969 - Glauben an Irdisches (essays)
- 1970 - Briefe an Leser.
- 1970 - Über Kunstwerk und Wirklichkeit.
- 1971 - Überfahrt. Eine Liebesgeschichte. "Crossing: A Love Story" (Diálogos Books, 2016)
- 1972 - Sonderbare Begegnungen Strange Encounters (short stories)
- 1973 - Der Prozeß der Jeanne d'Arc zu Rouen 1431 The Trial of Joan of Arc in Rouen (radio play, later adapted by Berthold Brecht)
- 1973 – Benito's Blue and Nine Other Stories
- 1977 - Steinzeit. "Stone Age" Wiederbegegnung "Reencounter" (short stories)
- 1980 - Drei Frauen aus Haiti Three Women from Haiti (short stories)
- 1990 - Der gerechte Richter The Righteous Judge (short stories)

== See also ==
- Exilliteratur
