= Maynard '62 =

Studio album by Maynard Ferguson
- Released: 1962
- Recorded: June 20 and December 1961; New York City
- Genre: Jazz
- Label: Roulette; R 52083
- Producer: Teddy Reig

Maynard Ferguson chronology
"Straightaway" Jazz Themes (1961)	Maynard '62 (1962)	Si! Si! M.F. (1962)

Maynard '62 is an album released by Canadian jazz trumpeter Maynard Ferguson featuring tracks recorded in late 1961 and originally released on the Roulette label.

== Reception ==
Professional ratings
Review scores
Source	Rating
AllMusic	3/5 stars

AllMusic awarded the album 3 stars.

== Track listing ==
1. "Have You Met Miss Jones?" (Richard Rodgers, Lorenz Hart) – 2:28
2. "Maria" (Leonard Bernstein, Stephen Sondheim) – 3:02
3. "Zip 'n' Zap" (Al Gilbert) – 2:52
4. "Lazy Afternoon" (Jerome Moross, John La Touche) – 4:17
5. "Go East Young Man" (Slide Hampton) – 5:45
6. "This Is My Lucky Day" (Ray Henderson, Buddy DeSylva, Lew Brown) – 2:25
7. ""X" Stream" (Jaki Byard) – 3:10
8. "Four" (Miles Davis) – 3:32
9. "Pretty Little Nieda" (Rolf Ericson) – 5:46
10. "'Round About the Blues" (Don Sebesky) – 4:16
- Recorded in New York City on June 20, 1961 (track 10) and December 1961 (tracks 1–9)

== Personnel ==
- Maynard Ferguson – trumpet, trombone
- Bill Berry (track 10), Chet Ferretti, Nat Pavone (tracks 1–9), Don Rader – trumpet
- Slide Hampton (tracks 1–9), Kenny Rupp, Ray Winslow (track 10) – trombone
- Lanny Morgan – alto saxophone, flute
- Willie Maiden – tenor saxophone, clarinet
- Don Menza – tenor saxophone, soprano saxophone, flute
- Frank Hittner – baritone saxophone, bass clarinet
- Mike Abene (tracks 1–9), Jaki Byard (track 10) – piano
- Linc Milliman (tracks 1–9), John Neves (track 10) – bass
- Rufus Jones – drums
- Jaki Byard, Slide Hampton, Willie Maiden, Don Sebesky, Ernie Wilkins – arrangers
