= Maynard '64 =

Studio album by Maynard Ferguson
- Released: 1963
- Recorded: February 26, 1959, January 20, 1960 and March 1962; New York City
- Genre: Jazz
- Label: Roulette; R 52107
- Producer: Teddy Reig

Maynard Ferguson chronology
Message from Maynard (1962)	Maynard '64 (1963)	The New Sounds of Maynard Ferguson (1963)

Maynard '64 is an album released by Canadian jazz trumpeter Maynard Ferguson collecting tracks recorded between 1959 and 1962 which was originally released on the Roulette label.

== Reception ==
Professional ratings
Review scores
Source	Rating
AllMusic	4/5 stars

AllMusic reviewer Scott Yanow stated "the boppish performances feature such soloists as altoist Lanny Morgan, the tenors of Willie Maiden and Don Menza and pianist Mike Abene. The arrangements took advantage of the band's many strengths and the result is a solid set of swinging music".

== Track listing ==
All compositions by Willie Maiden except where noted.

1. "For the Cats" – 2:46
2. "Vignette" – 2:52
3. "New Bag Blues" (Mike Abene) – 3:07
4. "Easy Chair" (Don Sebesky) – 3:59
5. "My Sweetie Went Away, She Didn't Say Where, When, or Why" (Rey Turk, Lou Handman) – 2:51
6. "Animated Suspension" – 2:22
7. "Saturday Night (Is the Loneliest Night of the Week)" (Jule Styne, Sammy Cahn) – 2:47
8. "Great Guns" (Ernie Wilkins) – 5:17
9. "Do Nothing till You Hear from Me" (Duke Ellington, Bob Russell) – 2:20
- Recorded in New York City on February 26, 1959 (track 9), January 20, 1961 (track 7), early 1962 (tracks 5 & 8) and March 1962 (tracks 1–4 & 6)

== Personnel ==
- Maynard Ferguson – trumpet, leader
- Bill Berry (track 7), Bill Chase (track 9), Gene Coe (tracks 1–6 & 8), Don Ellis (track 9), Rolf Ericson (track 7), Chet Ferretti (track 7), Larry Moser (track 9), Natale Pavone (tracks 1–6 & 8), Don Rader (tracks 1–6 & 8) – trumpet
- John Gale (tracks 1–6 & 8), Slide Hampton (track 9), Kenny Rupp (tracks 1–8), Don Sebesky (track 9), Ray Winslow (track 7) – trombone
- Jimmy Ford (track 9), Lanny Morgan (tracks 1–8) – alto saxophone
- Joe Farrell (track 7), Carmen Leggio (track 9), Willie Maiden, Don Menza (tracks 1–6 & 8) – tenor saxophone
- Frank Hittner (tracks 1–8), John Lanni (track 9) – baritone saxophone, bass clarinet
- Mike Abene (tracks 1–6 & 8), Jaki Byard (track 7), Bob Dogan (track 9) – piano
- Linc Milliman (tracks 1–6 & 8), Jimmy Rowser (track 9), Charlie Sanders (track 7) – bass
- Frankie Dunlop (track 9), Rufus Jones (tracks 1–8) – drums
- Mike Abene (tracks 3 & 5), Jaki Byard (track 7), Willie Maiden (tracks 1, 2, 6 & 9), Don Sebesky (track 4), Ernie Wilkins (track 8) – arrangers
