= Si! Si! M.F. =

Studio album by Maynard Ferguson
- Released: 1962
- Recorded: Early 1962; New York City
- Genre: Jazz
- Length: 37:16
- Label: Roulette; R 52084
- Producer: Teddy Reig

Maynard Ferguson chronology
Maynard '62 (1961)	Si! Si! M.F. (1962)	Maynard '63 (1962)

Si! Si! M.F. is an album released by jazz trumpeter Maynard Ferguson featuring tracks recorded in early 1962 and originally released on the Roulette label.

== Reception ==
Professional ratings
Review scores
Source	Rating
AllMusic	4/5 stars
The Penguin Guide to Jazz	3/4 stars

AllMusic reviewer Scott Yanow stated "the boppish performances feature such soloists as altoist Lanny Morgan, the tenors of Willie Maiden and Don Menza and pianist Mike Abene. The arrangements (by Ernie Wilkins, Marty Paich, Don Sebesky, Don Rader, Maiden, Abene and Menza) took advantage of the band's many strengths and the result is a solid set of swinging music". The Penguin Guide to Jazz picked the arrangement of "Mimi" as a highlight and the playing on "Morgan's Organ" as the best on the album.

== Track listing ==
1. "What'll I Do" (Irving Berlin) – 2:38
2. "Early Hours" (Marty Paich) – 3:54
3. "Morganpoint" (Don Sebesky) – 4:54
4. "Si! Si! – M. F." (Don Rader) – 6:10
5. "Almost Like Being in Love" (Frederick Loewe, Alan Jay Lerner) – 2:00
6. "Mimi" (Don Menza) – 5:14
7. "Morgan's Organ" (Ernie Wilkins) – 4:20
8. "Born to Be Blue" (Robert Wells, Mel Tormé) – 3:35
9. "Straight Out" (Menza) – 3:31

== Personnel ==
- Maynard Ferguson – trumpet, leader
- Gene Arnold Goe, Natale Pavone, Donald Arthur Rader – trumpet
- John C. Gale, Kenneth Harold Rupp – trombone
- Lanny Morgan – alto saxophone
- Willie Maiden – tenor saxophone, clarinet
- Donald J. Menza – tenor saxophone
- Frank J. Hittner Jr. – baritone saxophone, bass clarinet
- Michael Christian Joseph Abene – piano
- Lincoln B. Milliman – bass
- Rufus Jones – drums
- Mike Abene (tracks 1 & 8), Don Menza (tracks 6 & 9), Marty Paich (track 2), Don Rader (track 4), Don Sebesky (tracks 3 & 5), Ernie Wilkins (track 7) – arrangers
