= Joe Farrell =

American jazz musician (1937–1986)

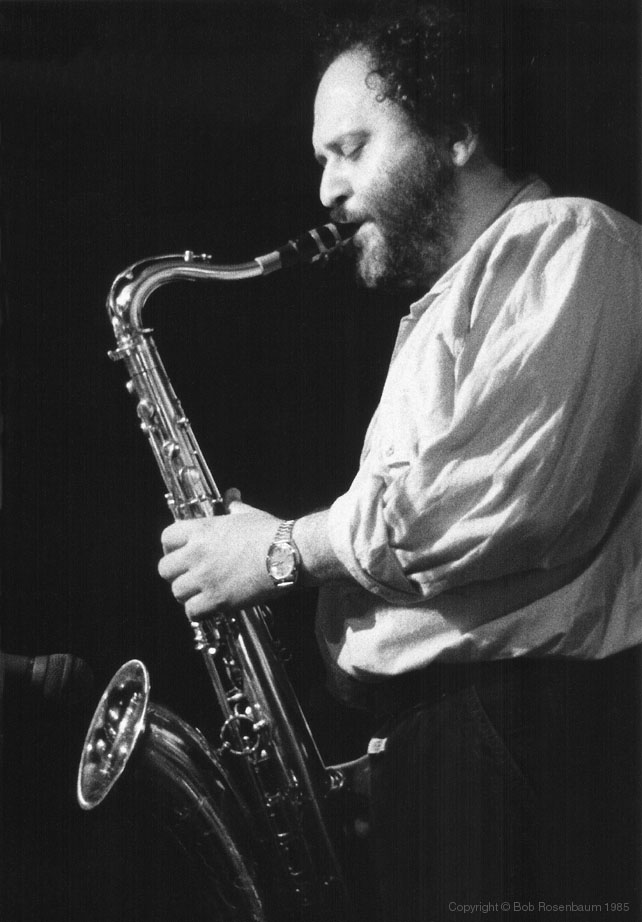
- Joe Farrell performing at Lush Life in New York City, 1985

Background information
- Born: Joseph Carl Firrantello; December 16, 1937
- Origin: Chicago Heights, Illinois, U.S.
- Died: January 10, 1986 (aged 48) Duarte, California, U.S.
- Genres: Jazz; jazz funk; fusion; be bop
- Occupations: Musician; composer; bandleader
- Instruments: Tenor saxophone; soprano saxophone; oboe; flute; English horn
- Years active: 1962–1986
- Label: CTI

Joseph Carl Firrantello (December 16, 1937 – January 10, 1986), known as Joe Farrell, was an American jazz multi-instrumentalist who primarily performed as a saxophonist and flutist. He is best known for a series of albums under his own name on the CTI record label and for playing in the initial incarnation of Chick Corea's Return to Forever as well as the last.

== Early life and education ==
Farrell was born in Chicago Heights, Illinois. As a child, Farrell began playing the flute and clarinet. After graduating from the University of Illinois at Urbana–Champaign in 1959, he moved to New York City to work as a freelance musician.

== Career ==
He joined the Ralph Marterie Band in 1957 and later played with Maynard Ferguson and The Thad Jones/ Mel Lewis Orchestra. He also recorded with Charles Mingus, Andrew Hill, Jaki Byard, Players Association and Elvin Jones. After the death of John Coltrane, Elvin Jones formed a pianoless trio with Jimmy Garrison and Farrell, recording two albums for Blue Note in 1968.

In the late 1960s and throughout the 1970s, Farrell performed with Chick Corea and Return to Forever. He is the flutist on the original recording of the Corea-penned jazz standard "Spain."

He did numerous sessions and contributed a flute solo to Aretha Franklin's 1973 hit "Until You Come Back to Me (That's What I'm Gonna Do)". The Santana track "When I Look into Your Eyes" (from Welcome [1973]) includes prominent flute solos from Farrell. During this period, he also contributed tenor saxophone and oboe solos to Hall & Oates' Abandoned Luncheonette (1973). Some of the most famous funk singles of James Brown feature Farrell as a part of the horn section.

In 1976, Farrell recorded a duo album with George Benson called Benson & Farrell on CTI Records.

Farrell recorded Flute Talk with Sam Most in 1979, which was billed as a duet of the world's two greatest jazz flutists.

Farrell performed with Brazilian percussionist Airto and Airto's wife Flora Purim on the album Three-Way Mirror. A message on the CD jacket dedicates the 1987 album to Farrell and states it contains his final recordings.

== Death ==
Farrell died of myelodysplastic syndrome (MDS) at the City of Hope National Medical Center in Duarte, California, on January 10, 1986, at the age of 48.

== Legacy ==
In 2008, Farrell's daughter Kathleen Firrantello filed a lawsuit against rappers Kanye West, Method Man, Redman and Common, and their respective record labels, for allegedly using portions of Farrell's 1974 musical composition "Upon This Rock" in their songs without approval. Firrantello was seeking punitive damages of at least US$1 million and asked that no further copies of the songs be made, sold or performed.

== Discography ==
=== As leader / co-leader ===
- 1967: Jazz for a Sunday Afternoon Volume 4 (Live at the Village Vanguard) with Chick Corea, others (Solid State)
- 1970: Joe Farrell Quartet with Chick Corea, John McLaughlin (CTI)
- 1971: Outback (CTI)
- 1972: Moon Germs (CTI)
- 1973: Penny Arcade (CTI)
- 1974: Upon This Rock (CTI)
- 1975: Canned Funk (CTI)
- 1976: Benson & Farrell with George Benson (CTI)
- 1977: La Catedral Y El Toro (Warner Bros.)
- 1978: Night Dancing (Warner Bros.)
- 1979: Skate Board Park (Xanadu)
- 1980: Sonic Text (Contemporary)
- 1980: Farrell's Inferno (Contemporary), Recorded live at Pasquale's jazz club, Malibu, California.
- 1980: Joe Farrell & Paul Horn: Jazz Gala 1980 Vol. 3 (Legends Of Music), Recorded live at Palm Beach Casino, Cannes, France.
- 1982: Darn That Dream (Quartet/Quintet with Art Pepper, George Cables, Tony Dumas, John Dentz) (Real Time; reissue: Drive Archive)
- 1983: Vim 'n' Vigor with Louis Hayes (Timeless)
- 1985: Clark Woodard and Joe Farrell with Clark Woodard (BCS)
- 1985: Three-Way Mirror with Airto Moreira, Flora Purim (Reference Recordings)

=== As sideman ===
With Mose Allison

- Hello There, Universe (Atlantic, 1970)
- Your Mind Is on Vacation (Atlantic, 1976)
- Middle Class White Boy (Elektra/Musician, 1982)

With Patti Austin

- End of a Rainbow (CTI, 1976)
- In My Life (CTI, 1983)

With Average White Band

- AWB (Atlantic, 1974)

With The Band

- Rock of Ages (Capitol, 1972)

With Ray Barreto

- La Cuna (CTI, 1979 [1981])

With the Bee Gees

- Main Course (RSO, 1975)

With George Benson

- Tell It Like It Is (A&M/CTI, 1969)
- Good King Bad (CTI, 1975)
- Pacific Fire (CTI, 1983)

With Willie Bobo

- Bobo's Beat (Roulette, 1962)

With Frank Butler

- Wheelin' and Dealin' (Xanadu, 1978)

With Jaki Byard

- Jaki Byard Quartet Live! (Prestige, 1965)
- The Last from Lennie's (Prestige, 1965 [2003])

With George Cables

- Circle (Contemporary, 1979 [1985])

With Billy Cobham

- Spectrum (Atlantic, 1973)

With Chick Corea

- Tones for Joan's Bones (Vortex, 1966)
- The Leprechaun (Polydor, 1976)
- The Mad Hatter (Polydor, 1978)
- Secret Agent (Polydor, 1978)
- Friends (Polydor, 1978)
- Tap Step (Warner Bros., 1980)

With Return to Forever

- Return to Forever (ECM, 1972)
- Light as a Feather (Polydor, 1972)
- Musicmagic (Columbia, 1977)
- Live (Columbia, 1977)

With Lou Donaldson

- Sophisticated Lou (Blue Note, 1973)

With Cornell Dupree

- Teasin' (Atlantic, 1974)

With Maynard Ferguson

- Newport Suite (Roulette, 1960)
- Let's Face the Music and Dance (Roulette, 1960)
- Maynard '61 (Roulette, 1961)
- Double Exposure with Chris Connor (Atlantic, 1961)
- Two's Company with Chris Connor (Roulette, 1961)
- Maynard '64 (Roulette, 1959–1962 [1963]) note: 1 track only
- Primal Scream (Columbia, 1976)
- Conquistador (Columbia, 1977)

With Aretha Franklin

- Let Me in Your Life (Atlantic, 1973)

With Fuse One

- Fuse One (CTI, 1980)

With Art Garfunkel

- Watermark (Columbia, 1977)

With Grant Green

- The Main Attraction (Kudu, 1976)

With Urbie Green

- The Fox (CTI, 1976)

With Bobby Hackett

- Creole Cookin' (Verve, 1967)

With Daryl Hall & John Oates

- Abandoned Luncheonette (Atlantic, 1973)

With Slide Hampton

- Explosion! The Sound of Slide Hampton (Atlantic, 1962)

With Andrew Hill

- Dance with Death (Blue Note, 1968 [1980])
- Passing Ships (Blue Note, 1969 [2003])

With Johnny Hodges

- 3 Shades of Blue (Flying Dutchman, 1970)

With Freddie Hubbard

- The Love Connection (A&M, 1979)

With Jackie and Roy

- A Wilder Alias (CTI, 1973)

With Antônio Carlos Jobim

- Stone Flower (CTI, 1970)
- Tide (A&M, 1970)
- Urubu (Warner Bros., 1976)

With Elvin Jones

- Puttin' It Together (Blue Note, 1968)
- The Ultimate (Blue Note, 1968)
- Poly-Currents (Blue Note, 1970)
- Genesis (Blue Note, 1971)
- Merry-Go-Round (Blue Note, 1971)
- New Agenda (Vanguard, 1975)

With The Thad Jones/Mel Lewis Orchestra

- Presenting Thad Jones/Mel Lewis and the Jazz Orchestra (Solid State, 1966)
- Live at the Village Vanguard (Solid State, 1967)
- Monday Night (Solid State, 1968)
- Central Park North (Solid State, 1969)
- Consummation (Solid State, 1970)

With Rufus Jones

- Five on Eight (Cameo, 1964)

With Lee Konitz

- Chicago 'n All That Jazz (Groove Merchant, 1975)

With John Larkin

- John Larkin (Transition, 1986)

With Neil Larsen

- High Gear (Horizon/A&M, 1979)

With Jeff Lorber Fusion

- Soft Space (Inner City, 1978)
- Water Sign (Arista, 1979)

With Arif Mardin

- Journey (Atlantic, 1974)

With Pat Martino

- Strings! (Prestige, 1967)

With Jack McDuff

- The Fourth Dimension (Cadet, 1974)
- Sophisticated Funk (Chess, 1976)

With Charles Mingus

- Pre-Bird (aka Mingus Revisited) (Mercury, 1960)

With Mingus Dynasty

- Chair in the Sky (Elektra, 1979)
- Live at Montreux (Atlantic, 1980)

With Blue Mitchell

- Many Shades of Blue (Mainstream, 1974)

With James Moody

- The Blues and Other Colors (Milestone, 1969)

With Airto Moreira

- Free (CTI, 1972)
- Latino - Aqui Se Puede (Sobocode, 1984)

With Laura Nyro

- Eli and the Thirteenth Confession (Columbia, 1968)
- Christmas and the Beads of Sweat (Columbia, 1970)

With Flora Purim

- Humble People (Concord, 1985)

With The Rascals

- Peaceful World (Columbia, 1971)

With Dizzy Reece

- Asia Minor (Prestige, 1962)

With Sal Salvador

- You Ain't Heard Nothin' Yet! (Dauntless, 1963)

With Santana

- Welcome (Columbia, 1973)

With Lalo Schifrin

- Black Widow (CTI, 1976)
- Towering Toccata (CTI, 1976)

With Don Sebesky

- Giant Box (CTI, 1973)

With Carly Simon

- Boys in the Trees (Elektra, 1978)

With Harris Simon

- New York Connection (Overseas Records/Estwind, 1978 [1980-1984])

With Dakota Staton

- I Want a Country Man (Groove Merchant, 1973)

With Bobby Timmons

- Got to Get It! (Milestone, 1967)

With Stanley Turrentine

- A Bluish Bag (Blue Note, 2007) - Recorded in 1967

With Allen Vizzutti

- Allen Vizzutti (Headfirst, 1981)
- Skyrocket (Summit, 1995)
