= "Straightaway" Jazz Themes =

Studio album by Maynard Ferguson
- Released: 1961
- Recorded: June 20–21, 1961
- Studio: New York City
- Genre: Jazz
- Length: 34:33
- Label: Roulette
- Producer: Teddy Reig

Maynard Ferguson chronology
Two's Company (1961)	"Straightaway" Jazz Themes (1961)	Maynard '62 (1961)

"Straightaway" Jazz Themes is an album released by Canadian jazz trumpeter Maynard Ferguson containing music composed for the 1961–1962 television series Straightaway. The album was recorded in 1961 and released by Roulette.

== Reception ==
Professional ratings
Review scores
Source	Rating
AllMusic	3/5 stars

At AllMusic, Scott Yanow gave the album three stars, writing, "this is one of the lesser Maynard recordings from this busy era (none of the material is all that memorable) but fans of his big band should enjoy the somewhat obscure music anyway."

== Track listing ==
All of the tracks were composed by Maynard Ferguson.

1. "Straightaway" – 2:20
2. "Apprehensions" – 4:14
3. "Mambo Le Mans" – 5:10
4. "Cocky Scott" – 3:44
5. "Up Shift" – 2:45
6. "Last Lap" – 3:51
7. "Melancholia" – 2:23
8. "Pit Stop" – 2:02
9. "Stroking" – 5:57
10. "After the Race" – 2:06

== Personnel ==
- Maynard Ferguson – trumpet
- Bill Berry – trumpet
- Chet Ferretti – trumpet
- Don Rader – trumpet
- Kenny Rupp – trombone
- Ray Winslow – trombone
- Lanny Morgan – alto saxophone
- Willie Maiden – tenor saxophone, arrangements
- Don Menza – tenor saxophone
- Frank Hittner – baritone saxophone
- Jaki Byard – piano
- John Neves – double bass
- Rufus Jones – drums
- Don Sebesky – arrangements
