= Message from Maynard =

Studio album by Maynard Ferguson
- Released: 1963
- Recorded: March 1962; New York City
- Genre: Jazz
- Label: Roulette; R 52101
- Producer: Teddy Reig

Maynard Ferguson chronology
Maynard '63 (1962)	Message from Maynard (1963)	Maynard '64 (1963)

Message from Maynard is an album released by Canadian jazz trumpeter Maynard Ferguson featuring tracks recorded in early 1962 and originally released on the Roulette label.

== Reception ==
Professional ratings
Review scores
Source	Rating
AllMusic	3/5 stars

AllMusic reviewer Scott Yanow stated "None of the originals caught on, but there are plenty of fine solos from the leader/trumpeter, Menza on tenor, altoist Lanny Morgan and pianist Abene; plus, the rhythm section is really pushed by drummer Rufus Jones".

== Track listing ==
All compositions by Don Menza except where noted.

1. "September Moan" (Don Sebesky) – 4:04
2. "Statement" – 6:08
3. "Nude Mood" – 2:45
4. "One for Otis" – 2:43
5. "Reflection" – 2:49
6. "Head Hunter" – 2:57
7. "Lament for Susan" (Mike Abene) – 3:43
8. "L & M" (Don Rader) – 3:06
9. "Jennifer's Bounce" (Rader) – 2:21

== Personnel ==
- Maynard Ferguson – trumpet, leader
- John C. Gale, Gene A. Goe, Natale Pavone, Donald A. Rader – trumpet
- Kenneth H. Rupp – trombone
- Lanny Morgan – alto saxophone
- Willie Maiden, Donald J. Menza – tenor saxophone
- Frank J. Hittner, Jr. – baritone saxophone
- Michael C. J. Abene – piano
- Lincoln B. Milliman – bass
- Rufus Jones – drums
- Mike Abene (track 7), Don Menza (tracks 2–6), Don Rader (tracks 8 & 9, Don Sebesky (track 1) – arrangers
