= Maynard '63 =

Studio album by Maynard Ferguson
- Released: 1963
- Recorded: March 1962; New York City
- Genre: Jazz
- Label: Roulette; R 52090
- Producer: Teddy Reig

Maynard Ferguson chronology
Si! Si! M.F. (1962)	Maynard '63 (1963)	Message from Maynard (1963)

Maynard '63 is an album released by Canadian jazz trumpeter Maynard Ferguson featuring tracks recorded in March 1962 and originally released on the Roulette label.

== Reception ==
Professional ratings
Review scores
Source	Rating
AllMusic	3/5 stars

AllMusic reviewer Scott Yanow stated "In addition to the exciting leader/trumpeter, the main soloists are altoist Lanny Morgan, Don Menza and Willie Maiden on tenors and pianist Mike Abene, all of whom excel on the bop-oriented music. This was one of the best big bands of the era".

== Track listing ==
All compositions by Mike Abene except where noted.

1. "Antibes" (Don Rader) – 2:57
2. "In Retrospect" (Ernie Wilkins) – 3:07
3. "Let's Try" (Tom McIntosh) – 4:37
4. "Guess Again" (Bill Mathieu) – 3:31
5. "Hate Notes" (Don Menza) – 2:33
6. "Sin Blues" (Rader) – 2:52
7. "Overcoat Stomp" – 2:40
8. "Fox Hunt" – 3:16
9. "Spookin'" – 3:16
10. "Knarf" – 4:41

== Personnel ==
- Maynard Ferguson – trumpet, leader
- Gene Coe, Natale Pavone, Don Rader – trumpet
- John Gale, Kenny Rupp – trombone
- Lanny Morgan – alto saxophone
- Willie Maiden, Don Menza – tenor saxophone
- Frank Hittner – baritone saxophone
- Mike Abene – piano
- Linc Milliman – bass
- Rufus Jones – drums
- Mike Abene (tracks 7–10), Bill Mathieu (track 4), Don Menza (track 5), Don Rader (tracks 1 & 6), Ernie Wilkins (track 2) – arrangers
