= Maynard '61 =

Studio album by Maynard Ferguson
- Released: 1961
- Recorded: October 14 & 20 and December 21, 1960 and January 20, 1961; New York City
- Genre: Jazz
- Label: Roulette; R 52064
- Producer: Teddy Reig

Maynard Ferguson chronology
Let's Face the Music and Dance (1960)	Maynard '61 (1961)	Double Exposure (1961)

Maynard '61 is an album by jazz trumpeter Maynard Ferguson featuring tracks recorded in late 1960 and early 1961 and originally released on the Roulette label.

== Reception ==
Professional ratings
Review scores
Source	Rating
AllMusic	3/5 stars
The Penguin Guide to Jazz	3.5/4 stars

Scott Yanow of AllMusic states, "Maynard Ferguson led his finest orchestra during his period with Roulette". For the CD reissue (Roulette CDP 7939002), The Penguin Guide to Jazz praised the brighter sound of the CD and picked Ferguson's solo on the bonus track "Go East, Young Man" as a highlight.

== Track listing ==
1. "Olé" (Slide Hampton) – 6:30
2. "New Blue" (Hampton) – 5:42
3. "Blues for Kapp" (Marty Paich) – 5:10
4. "Ultimate Rejection" (Joe Farrell) – 6:15
5. "The Pharaoh" (Hampton) – 7:41
6. "Goodbye" (Gordon Jenkins) – 4:45
- Recorded in New York City on October 14, 1960 (track 1), October 20, 1960 (tracks 2 & 5), December 21, 1960 (tracks 4) and January 20, 1961 (tracks 3 & 6)

== Personnel ==
- Maynard Ferguson – trumpet, trombone
- Bill Berry (tracks 3 & 6), Rolf Ericson (tracks 3, 4 & 6), Chet Ferretti, Rick Kiefer (tracks 1, 2, 4 & 5), Jerry Tyree (tracks 1, 2 & 5) – trumpet
- Slide Hampton (tracks 1, 2, 4 & 5), Kenny Rupp, Ray Winslow (tracks 3 & 6) – trombone
- Lanny Morgan – alto saxophone, flute
- Willie Maiden – tenor saxophone, clarinet
- Joe Farrell – tenor saxophone, soprano saxophone, flute
- Frank Hittner – baritone saxophone, bass clarinet
- Jaki Byard – piano
- Charlie Sanders – bass
- Rufus Jones – drums
- Joe Farrell, Slide Hampton, Willie Maiden, Marty Paich, Don Sebesky – arrangers
