= Chet Ferretti =

American jazz and big band trumpeter

Augustino Chester "Chet" Ferretti (November 7, 1933 – March 4, 1971) was a jazz and big band trumpeter, known mostly for his influential lead trumpet playing with Maynard Ferguson's band in the early 1960's.

== Career ==
Born to Agostino and Dora (Muccini) Ferrettii in Massachusetts, Chet enlisted in the Army in 1954, playing with the 1st Armored Division Band at Fort Bliss, in El Paso, Texas. After leaving the service he attended Boston University, and began playing lead trumpet for Herb Pomeroy's Orchestra, with whom he recorded three albums. He married Boston University classmate Nancy Henry in 1959. In October 1959 he joined Maynard Ferguson's Birdland Dream Band, touring and recording with the band until 1965. Ferretti's lead playing during this period was highly influential; he has been mentioned as a favorite by such trumpeters as Roger Ingram, Dave Stahl, Dan Miller, Patrick Hession, and Don Rader. On leaving Ferguson's band, Ferretti toured and/or recorded with Lena Horne, Lionel Hampton, Woody Herman, Sid Caesar, and Slide Hampton. After his untimely death in 1971, Ferretti's students recorded the album Chet Ferretti Memorial Concert with special guests Bill Watrous and Marian McPartland, in order to raise money for Ferretti's children.

== Discography ==
- Herb Pomeroy - Life Is a Many Splendored Gig (Roulette, 1957)
- Herb Pomeroy - Band in Boston (United Artists, 1958)
- Irene Kral & Herb Pomeroy - The Band and I (United Artists, 1958)
- Maynard Ferguson - Newport Suite (Roulette, 1960)
- Maynard Ferguson - Let's Face the Music and Dance (Roulette, 1960)
- Maynard Ferguson - Maynard '61 (Roulette, 1961)
- Maynard Ferguson - "Straightaway" Jazz Themes (Roulette, 1961)
- Maynard Ferguson & Chris Connor - Double Exposure (A & R Records, 1961)
- Maynard Ferguson & Chris Connor - Two's Company (Roulette, 1961)
- Maynard Ferguson - Maynard '62 (Roulette, 1962)
- Slide Hampton - Explosion! The Sound of Slide Hampton (Atlantic, 1962)
- Maynard Ferguson - Maynard '64 (Roulette, 1963)
- Maynard Ferguson - The Blues Roar (Mainstream, 1964)
