= Cornucopia (album) =

Studio album by Dizzy Gillespie
- Released: 1970
- Recorded: August 18 & 19, 1969; A&R Studios, New York City
- Genre: Jazz
- Length: 28:15
- Label: Solid State; SS 18061
- Producer: Richard Carpenter

Dizzy Gillespie chronology
It's My Way (1969)	Cornucopia (1970)	The Real Thing (1970)

Cornucopia is an album by American jazz trumpeter Dizzy Gillespie featuring performances of popular songs recorded in 1969 and originally released on the Solid State label.

== Track listing ==
1. "Windmills of Your Mind" (Michel Legrand, Alan Bergman, Marilyn Bergman) - 3:07
2. "My Cherie Amour" (Stevie Wonder, Henry Cosby, Sylvia Moy) - 3:23
3. "Get Back" (John Lennon, Paul McCartney) - 2:36
4. "Yesterday's Dream" (Don Sebesky) - 3:55
5. "Lorraine" (Dizzy Gillespie) - 4:10
6. "Ann, Wonderful One" (Charles Carpenter, Earl Hines) - 2:57
7. "Love Theme from Romeo and Juliet" (Nino Rota) - 3:35
8. "Oh Happy Day" (Edwin Hawkins) - 4:32
9. "Tango-Rine" (Gillespie) - 3:20
10. "Both Sides, Now" (Joni Mitchell) - 3:16

== Personnel ==
- Dizzy Gillespie, Lew Soloff - trumpet
- Wayne Andre, Paul Faulise - trombone
- Don Corrado, Earl Chapin - French horn
- Jerome Richardson, Sol Schlinger, Stan Webb - woodwinds
- Billy Butler, Carl Lynch, Bucky Pizzarelli - electric guitar
- Mike Abene, Paul Griffin, Richard Tee - keyboards
- Chuck Rainey - electric bass
- Richard Davis - bass
- Jack Jennings, Bill LaVorgna, Bernard Purdie, Ed Shaughnessy - drums, percussion
- Unnamed string section arranged and conducted by Don Sebesky
