= Lanny Morgan =

American jazz musician (born 1934)

Harold Lansford Morgan (born March 30, 1934, in Des Moines, Iowa, United States), known as Lanny Morgan is an American jazz alto saxophonist, chiefly active on the West Coast jazz scene.

Morgan was raised in Los Angeles. In the 1950s, he played with Charlie Barnet, Si Zentner, Terry Gibbs, and Bob Florence, then did a stint in the U.S. military, for which reason he had to turn down an offer to play in the orchestra of Stan Kenton. From 1960-65 he played in Maynard Ferguson's orchestra; after a few years in New York City, he returned to Los Angeles in 1969. There he played frequently in the studios, was a member of Supersax, and played in the big bands of Bill Berry, Bob Florence, and Bill Holman.

Morgan also played on sessions for Nancy Sinatra and Steely Dan.

== Discography ==
- It's About Time (Palo Alto, 1982)
- The Lanny Morgan Quartet (VSOP, 1993)
- Pacific Standard (Contemporary, 1996)
- A Suite for Yardbird (Fresh Sound, 2002)

With Maynard Ferguson

- Let's Face the Music and Dance (Roulette, 1960)
- Maynard '61 (Roulette, 1961)
- Double Exposure (Atlantic, 1961) with Chris Connor
- Two's Company (Roulette, 1961) with Chris Connor
- "Straightaway" Jazz Themes (Roulette, 1961)
- Maynard '62 (Roulette, 1962)
- Si! Si! M.F. (Roulette, 1962)
- Maynard '63 (Roulette, 1962)
- Message from Maynard (Roulette, 1962)
- Maynard '64 (Roulette 1959-62 [1963])
- The New Sounds of Maynard Ferguson (Cameo, 1963)
- Come Blow Your Horn (Cameo, 1963)
- Color Him Wild (Mainstream, 1965)
- The Blues Roar (Mainstream, 1965)
- The Maynard Ferguson Sextet (Mainstream, 1965)

With Carmen McRae

- Can't Hide Love (Blue Note, 1976)

== Other sources ==
- Scott Yanow, Lanny Morgan at AllMusic
