= Five on Eight =

Studio album by Rufus Jones
- Genre: Jazz
- Label: Cameo
- Producer: Elliot Mezer

Five on Eight is the only album featuring drummer Rufus "Speedy" Jones as leader.

== Recording and music ==
Drummer Rufus "Speedy" Jones led a quintet in the period 1963–64; this led to the recording of Five on Eight. The album was produced by Elliot Mezer.

== Release and reception ==
The album was released by Cameo Records. It was Jones's only album as leader. Billboard gave it a three-star review.

== Track listing ==
1. "I Long for Your Love" – 3:12
2. "My Special Dream" – 3:50
3. "Theme from 'The Prize'" – 4:00
4. "Ebb Tide" – 2:27
5. "Bird Brain" – 3:45
6. "Just About That Time" – 3:02
7. "A Secret" – 4:47
8. "Rollin'" – 5:35
9. "Aluminum Baby" – 4:27

== Personnel ==
- Seldon Powell – tenor sax (tracks 1–5)
- Joe Farrell – tenor sax (tracks 6–9)
- Tommy Turrentine – trumpet (tracks 6–9)
- Jaki Byard – piano (tracks 6–9)
- Gene Bertoncini – guitar
- Major Holley – bass (tracks 1–5)
- Teddy Smith – bass (tracks 6–9)
- Rufus Jones – drums
