= Willie Maiden =

American jazz musician (1928–1976)

William Ralph Maiden (March 12, 1928 – May 29, 1976) was an American jazz saxophonist and arranger.

Maiden began on piano at age five and started playing saxophone at 11. He spent most of his career playing in big bands, and while he recorded copiously as a sideman, he never led his own session. He worked with Perez Prado in 1950 and arranged for Maynard Ferguson from 1952 into the 1960s. He played with Charlie Barnet in 1966, and played baritone sax in addition to arranging for Stan Kenton between 1969 and 1973. After this he taught at the University of Maine at Augusta until his death in 1976.

== Discography ==
With Maynard Ferguson

- Dimensions (EmArcy, 1954) – as arranger
- A Message from Newport (Roulette, 1958) – as performer and arranger
- Swingin' My Way Through College (Roulette, 1959) – as composer, performer and arranger
- Maynard Ferguson Plays Jazz for Dancing (Roulette, 1959) – as composer, performer and arranger
- Newport Suite (Roulette, 1960) – as composer, performer and arranger
- Let's Face the Music and Dance (Roulette, 1960) – as performer and arranger
- Maynard '61 (Roulette, 1961) – as performer and arranger
- Double Exposure (Atlantic, 1961) with Chris Connor
- Two's Company (Roulette, 1961) with Chris Connor
- "Straightaway" Jazz Themes (Roulette, 1961) – as performer and arranger
- Maynard '62 (Roulette, 1962) – as performer and arranger
- Si! Si! M.F. (Roulette, 1962) – as performer
- Maynard '63 (Roulette, 1962) – as performer
- Message from Maynard (Roulette, 1962) – as performer
- Maynard '64 (Roulette 1959-62 [1963]) – as composer, performer and arranger
- The New Sounds of Maynard Ferguson (Cameo, 1963) – as composer, performer and arranger
- Come Blow Your Horn (Cameo, 1963)
- Color Him Wild (Mainstream, 1965) – as composer, performer and arranger
- The Blues Roar (Mainstream, 1965) – as performer and arranger
- The Maynard Ferguson Sextet (Mainstream, 1965) – as composer and performer
- Stan Kenton and his orchestra live at Brigham Young University(April Fool 1971) - as performer, composer and arranger
