= Don Rader (musician) =

American jazz trumpeter (born 1935)

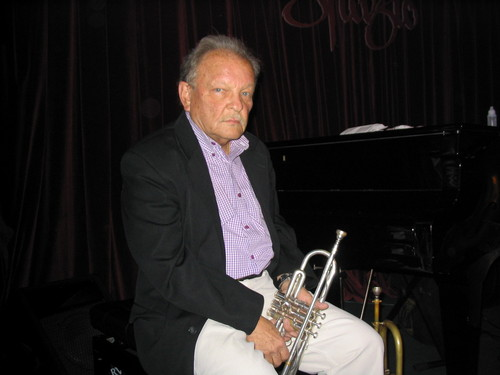
- Don Rader c. 2005

Background information
- Born: Donald Arthur Rader'; October 21, 1935; Rochester, Pennsylvania
- Died: April 18, 2023
- Genres: Jazz
- Occupation: Musician
- Instrument: Trumpet
- Years active: 1950s–2023

Donald Arthur Rader (born October 21, 1935; died April 18, 2023) was an American jazz trumpeter.

== Career ==
Rader began playing trumpet at age five and was taught by his father. He studied at Sam Houston State Teachers College and served in the Navy in the 1950s as a member of the band, then played and arranged for Woody Herman (1959–61), Maynard Ferguson (1961–63), and Count Basie (1963–64), Louie Bellson, Harry James, Terry Gibbs, Frank Foster, Henry Mancini, Les Brown (1967–72), and Stan Kenton.

He toured with Della Reese, Sarah Vaughn, Andy Williams, Percy Faith, Diana Ross, Elvis Presley, Jerry Lewis (intermittently for 28 years), and Bob Hope (intermittently for 28 years with five tours of wartime Vietnam).

He assembled a quintet in Los Angeles in 1972 and continued working with West Coast jazz musicians, including Lanny Morgan, Lew Tabackin, and Toshiko Akiyoshi. He recorded as a leader and worked in music education for many years, including in Australia in the 1980s.

He died in April 2023 at the age of 87.

== Discography ==
- Polluted Tears (DRM, 1973)
- Now (PBR International, 1976)
- Don Rader (Now, 1978)
- Wallflower (Discovery, 1978)
- Anemone (Jet Danger, 1980)
- A Foreign Affair (Bellaphon, 1990)
- Off the Beaten Track (Tall Poppies, 1998)
- Odyssey (2006)

=== As sideman ===
With Count Basie

- Ella and Basie! (Verve, 1963)
- More Hits of the 50's and 60's (Verve, 1963)
- It Might as Well Be Swing (Reprise, 1964)

With Maynard Ferguson

- Maynard '62 (Roulette, 1962)
- Si! Si! M.F. (Roulette, 1962)
- Maynard '63 (Roulette, 1962)
- Message from Maynard (Roulette, 1962)
- Maynard '64 (Roulette 1959-62 [1963])
- Color Him Wild (Mainstream, 1965)
- The Blues Roar (Mainstream, 1965)
