= The New Sounds of Maynard Ferguson =

Studio album by Maynard Ferguson and His Orchestra
- Released: April 1963
- Recorded: March 27–28, 1963
- Studio: Fine Recording Studios, New York City
- Genre: Jazz
- Label: Cameo; C/SC 1046
- Producer: Dave Edelman

Maynard Ferguson chronology
Maynard '64 (1959-62)	The New Sounds of Maynard Ferguson (1963)	Come BlowYour Horn (1963)

The New Sounds of Maynard Ferguson is an album by Canadian jazz trumpeter Maynard Ferguson recorded in 1963 which was originally released on the Cameo label.

== Reception ==
Professional ratings
Review scores
Source	Rating
AllMusic	3.5/5 stars
The Penguin Guide to Jazz Recordings	3/4 stars

AllMusic reviewer Matt Collar stated "Featuring arrangements by Don Sebesky, the albums showcased Ferguson's swinging and powerful high-note-centric style backed by his always dynamic ensemble".

== Track listing ==
1. "Take the "A" Train" (Billy Strayhorn) – 2:48
2. "Bossa Nova de Funk" (Willie Maiden) – 5:34
3. "Gravy Waltz" (Steve Allen, Ray Brown) – 4:10
4. "Cherokee (Indian Love Song)" (Ray Noble) – 4:23
5. "I'm Getting Sentimental Over You" (George Bassman, Ned Washington) – 3:15
6. " One O'Clock Jump" (Count Basie) – 5:57
7. "At the Sound of the Trumpet" (Maynard Ferguson, Maiden) – 4:44
8. "Maine Bone" (Mike Abene) – 3:03
9. "Watermelon Man" (Herbie Hancock) – 2:24
10. "Danny Boy" (Traditional) – 3:55

Note

- Recorded at Fine Recording Studios in Queens, New York on March 27, 1963 (tracks 1, 3, 5, 6 & 10) and March 28, 1963 (tracks 2, 4 & 7–9)

== Personnel ==
- Maynard Ferguson – trumpet, valve trombone, French horn
- Dusan Goykovitch, Nat Pavone, Rick Kiefer – trumpet
- Don Doane, Kenny Rupp – trombone
- Lanny Morgan – alto saxophone
- Willie Maiden, Frank Vicari – tenor saxophone
- Ronnie Cuber – baritone saxophone
- Mike Abene – piano
- Linc Milliman – bass
- Rufus Jones – drums
- Mike Abene (tracks 4 & 8), Willie Maiden (tracks 2, 3, 5, 7, 9 & 10), Don Sebesky (tracks 1 & 6) – arrangers
