= The Maynard Ferguson Sextet =

Studio album by Maynard Ferguson
- Released: 1965
- Recorded: September 13 & 14, 1965
- Genre: Jazz
- Length: 36:50; 52:05 (1991)
- Label: Mainstream; 56060/S6060
- Producer: Bob Shad

Maynard Ferguson chronology
The Blues Roar (1965)	The Maynard Ferguson Sextet (1965)	Ridin' High (1966)

The Maynard Ferguson Sextet (also released as Six by Six) is an album released by Canadian jazz trumpeter Maynard Ferguson featuring tracks recorded in 1965 and originally released on the Mainstream label. The 1991 CD rerelease was titled Magnitude and featured three previously unreleased tracks from the sessions.

== Reception ==
Professional ratings
Review scores
Source	Rating
Down Beat (Original Lp release)	4/5 stars
AllMusic	4/5 stars

AllMusic awarded the album 4 stars calling it an excellent album and states "Although this group did not last long, their mainstream recording has excellent performances and good solos from the somewhat forgotten band".

== Track listing ==
Side one
No.	Title	Writer(s)	Length
1.	"To and Fro"	Mike Abene	5:27
2.	"Love Theme from "The Sandpiper""	Johnny Mandel, Paul Francis Webster	4:43
3.	"No More Wood"	Mike Abene	4:43
4.	"April Fool"	Willie Maiden	4:04
Total length:			18:57

Side two
No.	Title	Writer(s)	Length
1.	"Summertime"	DuBose Heyward, George Gershwin	10:15
2.	"Between Races"	Chuck Mangione	7:38
Total length:			17:53

1991 CD edition bonus tracks
No.	Title	Length
7.	"The Clef"	4:55
8.	"Mike's Mike"	4:00
9.	"Slide by Slide"	6:20

== Personnel ==
- Maynard Ferguson - trumpet, flugelhorn
- Lanny Morgan - alto saxophone, flute
- Willie Maiden - tenor saxophone, baritone saxophone
- Mike Abene - piano, celesta
- Ronnie McClure - bass
- Tony Inzalaco - drums
