= Newport Suite =

Studio album by Maynard Ferguson
- Released: 1960
- Recorded: March 15, 16 & 22, 1960; Capitol Studios, New York City
- Genre: Jazz
- Length: 40:49
- Label: Roulette; R 52047
- Producer: Teddy Reig

Maynard Ferguson chronology
| Maynard Ferguson Plays Jazz for Dancing (1959) | Newport Suite (1960) | Let's Face the Music and Dance (1960) |

Newport Suite is an album recorded by Canadian jazz trumpeter Maynard Ferguson featuring tracks recorded in 1960 and originally released on the Roulette label.

== Reception ==
Professional ratings
Review scores
| Source | Rating |
|---|---|
| Allmusic | 4.5/5 stars |

Allmusic reviewer Ken Dryden described it as "one of the trumpeter's very best LPs" and states "Maynard Ferguson's bands of the early '60s produced many memorable albums, including this studio effort".

== Track listing ==
1. "Jazz Bary" (Willie Maiden) - 4:25
2. "Foxy" (Slide Hampton) - 5:10
3. "Newport" (Hampton) - 9:32
4. "Got the Spirit" (Hampton) - 3:50
5. "Sometimes I Feel Like a Motherless Child" (Traditional) - 2:54
6. "Ol' Man River" (Jerome Kern, Oscar Hammerstein II) - 6:58
7. "Three More Foxes" (Maiden) - 8:00

== Personnel ==
- Maynard Ferguson - trumpet, valve trombone, baritone horn
- Don Ellis, Augustino 'Chet' Ferretti, Rick Kiefer - trumpet
- Charles Greenlee, Mike Zagatini - trombone
- Jimmy Ford - alto saxophone
- Joe Farrell, Willie Maiden - tenor saxophone
- Frank Hittner - baritone saxophone
- Jaki Byard - piano
- Aubrey Tobin - bass
- Stu Martin - drums
- Slide Hampton, Willie Maiden - arranger
