= Let's Face the Music and Dance (Maynard Ferguson album) =

Studio album by Maynard Ferguson
- Released: 1960
- Recorded: October 11, 12 & 14, 1960; New York City
- Genre: Jazz
- Label: Roulette; R 52055
- Producer: Teddy Reig

Maynard Ferguson chronology
| Newport Suite (1960) | Let's Face the Music and Dance (1960) | Maynard '61 (1961) |

Let's Face the Music and Dance is an album by Canadian jazz trumpeter Maynard Ferguson featuring tracks recorded in late 1960 and originally released on the Roulette label.

== Reception ==
Professional ratings
Review scores
| Source | Rating |
|---|---|
| Allmusic | 3/5 stars |

Allmusic awarded the album 3 stars.

== Track listing ==
1. "Let's Face the Music and Dance" (Irving Berlin) - 1:58
2. "Teach Me Tonight" (Gene de Paul, Sammy Cahn) - 3:30
3. "Mango's" (Dee Libbey, Sid Wayne) - 4:05
4. "The Party's Over" (Jule Styne, Betty Comden, Adolph Green) - 3:42
5. "It Could Happen to You" (Jimmy Van Heusen, Johnny Burke) - 2:20
6. "You Don't Know What Love Is" (De Paul, Don Raye) - 2:51
7. "It's Only a Paper Moon" (Harold Arlen, Yip Harburg, Billy Rose) - 2:43
8. "The Masquerade Is Over" (Allie Wrubel, Herb Magidson) - 3:35
9. "My Foolish Heart" (Victor Young, Ned Washington) - 2:53
10. "Don't Take Your Love from Me" (Henry Nemo) - 2:54
11. "Spring Is Here" (Richard Rodgers, Lorenz Hart) - 4:00
12. "Let's Do It" (Cole Porter) - 3:07
- Recorded in New York City on October 11, 1960 (tracks 1, 3, 6, 9 & 10), October 12, 1960 (tracks 4, 7, 8, 11 & 12) and October 14, 1960 (tracks 2 & 5)

== Personnel ==
- Maynard Ferguson - trumpet
- Chet Ferretti, Rick Kiefer, Jerry Tyree - trumpet
- Slide Hampton, Kenny Rupp - trombone
- Lanny Morgan - alto saxophone
- Joe Farrell, Willie Maiden - tenor saxophone
- Frank Hittner - baritone saxophone
- Jaki Byard - piano
- Charlie Sanders - bass
- Rufus Jones - drums
- Joe Farrell, Slide Hampton, Willie Maiden, Don Sebesky - arrangers
