= Mike Abene =

American jazz pianist and arranger (born 1942)

- Born: Michael Abene; July 2, 1942 (age 83); Brooklyn, New York, U.S.
- Genres: Jazz
- Instruments: Piano

Michael Abene (born July 2, 1942) is an American jazz pianist known for accompanying singers and arranging music.

== Early life and education ==
Abene was born in Brooklyn, New York. His father, grandfather, and aunt were musicians. He studied composition at the Manhattan School of Music.

== Career ==
Abene has accompanied Susannah McCorkle Julius La Rosa, and others. He had his first solo album Solo Piano in 1986. Abene co-produced the album Avant Gershwin, which won the Grammy Award for Best Jazz Vocal Album in 2007.

== Discography ==
=== As leader ===
1986: You Must Have Been a Beautiful Baby (recorded December 1984)

=== As sideman ===
With Maynard Ferguson

- Maynard '62 (Roulette, 1962)
- Si! Si! M.F. (Roulette, 1962)
- Maynard '63 (Roulette, 1962)
- Message from Maynard (Roulette, 1962)
- Maynard '64 (Roulette 1959-62 [1963])
- The New Sounds of Maynard Ferguson (Cameo, 1963)
- Come Blow Your Horn (Cameo, 1963)
- Color Him Wild (Mainstream, 1965)
- The Blues Roar (Mainstream, 1965)
- The Maynard Ferguson Sextet (Mainstream, 1965)
- Ridin' High (Enterprise, 1967)

With Dizzy Gillespie

- Cornucopia (Solid State, 1969)

With Urbie Green

- The Fox (CTI, 1976)

With Cal Tjader

- Solar Heat (Skye, 1968)
