= Come Blow Your Horn (album) =

Studio album by Maynard Ferguson's Big Band
- Released: September 1963
- Recorded: August 29 and September 4, 1963
- Studio: Fine Recording Studios, New York City
- Genre: Jazz
- Label: Cameo; C/SC 1046
- Producer: Dave Edelman

Maynard Ferguson chronology
The New Sounds of Maynard Ferguson (1963)	Come Blow Your Horn (1963)	Color Him Wild (1964)

Come Blow Your Horn is an album recorded by Canadian jazz trumpeter Maynard Ferguson in 1963 which was originally released on the Cameo label.

== Reception ==
Professional ratings
Review scores
Source	Rating
AllMusic	3.5/5 stars

AllMusic reviewer Matt Collar stated "Featuring arrangements by Don Sebesky, the albums showcased Ferguson's swinging and powerful high-note-centric style backed by his always dynamic ensemble".

== Track listing ==
1. "Groove" (Oliver Nelson) – 2:48
2. "Country Boy" (Bill Holman) – 3:52
3. "Blues for a Four String Guitar" (Elmer Bernstein) – 2:25
4. "Whisper Not" (Benny Golson, Leonard Feather) – 6:24
5. "We've Got a World That Swings" (Lil Mattis, Lois Yule Brown) – 2:18
6. "Chicago That Toddling Town" (Fred Fisher) – 6:03
7. "Naked City Theme" (Billy May) – 2:27
8. "New Hope" (Don Raider) – 2:41
9. "Antony and Cleopatra Theme" (Alex North) – 2:30
10. "Come Blow Your Horn" (Jimmy van Heusen, Sammy Cahn) – 2:35
- Recorded at Fine Recording Studios in Queens, New York on August 29, 1963 (tracks 2, 3 & 5) and September 4, 1963 (tracks 1, 4, 6, 8 & 10) and unknown date (tracks 7 & 9)

== Personnel ==
- Maynard Ferguson – trumpet, valve trombone, French horn
- Dusan Goykovitch, Nat Pavone, Rick Kiefer – trumpet
- Don Doane, Kenny Rupp – trombone
- Lanny Morgan – alto saxophone
- Willie Maiden, Frank Vicari – tenor saxophone
- Ronnie Cuber – baritone saxophone
- Mike Abene – piano
- Linc Milliman – bass
- Rufus Jones – drums
- Mike Abene (track 4 & 6), Al Cohn (track 10), Bill Holman (track 2), Willie Maiden (track 5), Don Raider (track 8), Don Sebesky (tracks 7 & 9) – arrangers
