= The Blues Roar =

Studio album by Maynard Ferguson
- Released: 1965
- Recorded: 1964
- Genre: Jazz
- Label: Mainstream; 56045/S6045
- Producer: Bob Shad

Maynard Ferguson chronology
Color Him Wild (1965)	The Blues Roar (1965)	The Maynard Ferguson Sextet (1965)

The Blues Roar (also released as Screamin' Blues) is an album released by Canadian jazz trumpeter Maynard Ferguson featuring tracks recorded in 1964 and originally released on the Mainstream label.

== Reception ==
Professional ratings
Review scores
Source	Rating
AllMusic	3/5 stars
Record Mirror	4/5 stars

Scott Yanow of AllMusic awarded the album three stars out of five, describing it as a "fine set" and "the last recording by this excellent orchestra".

== Track listing ==
1. "Every Day I Have the Blues" (Arron Sparks) – 5:30
2. "Night Train" (Jimmy Forrest) – 9:00
3. "Mary Ann" (Ray Charles) – 3:21
4. "I Believe to My Soul" (Ray Charles) – 3:26
5. "What'd I Say" (Ray Charles) – 2:30
6. "Baltimore Oriole" (Hoagy Carmichael, Paul Francis Webster) – 5:10
7. "Alright, O.K. You Win" (Mamie Watts, Sid Wyche) – 3:23
8. "I Got a Woman" (Ray Charles) – 3:31

== Personnel ==
- Maynard Ferguson – trumpet, flugelhorn, valve trombone
- Bernie Glow – trumpet
- August Ferretti, Don Rader, Jimmy Nottingham, John Bello – trumpet, flugelhorn
- James Buffington, Ray Alonge – French horn
- Bill Watrous, John Messner, Paul Faulise, Urbie Green, Wayne Andre – trombone
- Don Butterfield – tuba
- Charlie Mariano – alto saxophone, clarinet
- Lanny Morgan – alto saxophone, clarinet, flute
- Willie Maiden, Frank Vicari – tenor saxophone
- Romeo Penque – tenor saxophone, flute, alto flute
- Phil Bodner, Stan Webb – tenor saxophone, piccolo, oboe, alto flute, baritone saxophone, soprano saxophone, clarinet, contrabass saxophone
- Roger Pemberton – baritone saxophone
- Barry Galbraith – guitar
- Margaret Ross – harp
- Mike Abene – piano
- Richard Davis – bass
- Mel Lewis – drums
- George Devens – percussion
- Mike Abene, Willie Maiden, Don Sebesky – arrangements
