= Two's Company (Maynard Ferguson and Chris Connor album) =

Studio album by Maynard Ferguson and Chris Connor
- Released: 1961
- Recorded: December 15 & 22, 1960, January 30, 1961
- Studio: Capitol Studios, New York City
- Genre: Jazz
- Label: Roulette; R/SR 52068
- Producer: Teddy Reig

Maynard Ferguson chronology
Double Exposure (1961)	Two's Company (1961)	"Straightaway" Jazz Themes (1961)

Two's Company is an album by trumpeter/bandleader Maynard Ferguson and vocalist Chris Connor featuring tracks recorded in late 1960 and early 1961 which was originally released on the Roulette label.

== Reception ==
Professional ratings
Review scores
Source	Rating
AllMusic	2.5/5 stars
DownBeat	2.5/5 stars
The Penguin Guide to Jazz Recordings	3/4 stars

The contemporaneous DownBeat reviewer criticized some of the arrangements and wrote that "Connor runs into a bit of intonation trouble on "The Wind"". AllMusic reviewer Scott Yanow stated "Although Ferguson gets to throw in some high-register blasts now and then, his orchestra is mostly used as a prop behind Connor. The singer does her best (her voice was in prime form around this time) but the flamboyant and often-pompous arrangements (which are uncredited) take away from any real spontaneity or swing. Charts for the companion Atlantic "Double Exposure" recorded in the same time frame (multiple sessions in late Dec 1960-early Jan 1961) are mostly credited to Don Sebesky, with two to Willie Maiden. An odd set".

== Track listing ==
1. "I Feel a Song Coming On" (Jimmy McHugh, Dorothy Fields, George Oppenheimer) – 2:03
2. "The Wind" (Russ Freeman, Jerry Gladstone) – 4:55
3. "New York's My Home" (Gordon Jenkins) – 4:35
4. "Guess Who I Saw Today" (Murray Grand, Elisse Boyd) – 3:27
5. "When the Sun Comes Out" (Harold Arlen, Ted Koehler) – 3:35
6. "Send for Me" (Ollie Jones) – 2:32
7. "Where Do You Go?" (Alec Wilder, Arnold Sundgaard) – 3:40
8. "Something's Coming" (Leonard Bernstein, Stephen Sondheim) – 6:32
9. "Deep Song" (George Cory, Douglass Cross) – 4:05
10. "Can't Get Out of This Mood" (Frank Loesser, McHugh) – 2:42
- Recorded in New York City on December 15, 1960 (tracks 2, 3 & 5), December 22, 1960 (tracks 4 & 7) and January 30, 1961 (tracks 1, 6 & 8–10)

== Personnel ==
- Chris Connor – vocals
- Maynard Ferguson – trumpet, trombone, French horn
- Bill Berry, Rolf Ericson, Chet Ferretti – trumpet
- Kenny Rupp, Ray Winslow – trombone
- Lanny Morgan – alto saxophone, flute
- Willie Maiden – tenor saxophone, clarinet
- Joe Farrell – tenor saxophone, soprano saxophone, flute
- Frank Hittner – baritone saxophone, bass clarinet
- Jaki Byard – piano
- John Neves – bass
- Rufus Jones – drums
