= Color Him Wild =

Studio album by Maynard Ferguson
- Released: 1965
- Recorded: 1964
- Genre: Jazz
- Label: Mainstream; 56031/S6031
- Producer: Harry Ringler

Maynard Ferguson chronology
Come Blow Your Horn (1964)	Color Him Wild (1965)	The Blues Roar (1965)

Color Him Wild (also released as Dues) is an album released by Canadian jazz trumpeter Maynard Ferguson featuring tracks recorded in 1964 and originally released on the Mainstream label.

== Reception ==
Professional ratings
Review scores
Source	Rating
Allmusic	3/5 stars

Allmusic awarded the album 3 stars calling it an excellent album and states "The band's sound and winning spirit were still unchanged from its prime days".

== Track listing ==
1. "Airegin" (Sonny Rollins) - 4:20
2. "Macarena" (Bernardino Monterde) - 3:28
3. "Green Dolphin Street" (Bronisław Kaper) - 4:00
4. "People" (Bob Merrill, Jule Styne) - 2:44
5. "This Night" (Ralph Rainger, Leo Robin) - 4:45
6. "The Lady's in Love" (Warren Noble) - 2:37
7. "Tinsel" (Willie Maiden) - 6:25
8. "Three More Foxes" (Maiden) - 6:00
9. "Come Rain or Come Shine" (Johnny Mercer, Harold Arlen) - 5:00

== Personnel ==
- Maynard Ferguson, Nat Pavone, Don Rader, Harry Hall, Dick Hurwitz - trumpet
- Kenny Rupp - trombone, tuba
- Rob McConnell - valve trombone
- Ronnie Cuber - baritone saxophone
- Willie Maiden, Frank Vicari - tenor saxophone, clarinet
- Lanny Morgan - alto saxophone, clarinet, flute
- Mike Abene - piano
- Ronnie McClure - bass
- Tony Inzalaco - drums
