= Double Exposure (Chris Connor and Maynard Ferguson album) =

Studio album by Chris Connor and Maynard Ferguson
- Released: 1961
- Recorded: December 5 & 14, 1960, January 23, 1961
- Studio: A & R Recording, New York City
- Genre: Jazz
- Length: 36:25
- Label: Atlantic; 8049
- Producer: Nesuhi Ertegun

Maynard Ferguson chronology
Maynard '61 (1961)	Double Exposure (1961)	Two's Company (1961)

Chris Connor chronology
A Portrait of Chris (1960)	Double Exposure (1961)	Two's Company (1961)

Double Exposure is an album by vocalist Chris Connor and trumpeter/bandleader Maynard Ferguson featuring tracks recorded in late 1960 and early 1961 which was originally released on the Atlantic label.

== Reception ==
Professional ratings
Review scores
Source	Rating
DownBeat	3/5 stars

The contemporaneous DownBeat reviewer commented: "Connor is in good voice throughout, and the band is in fine fettle". AllMusic reviewer Scott Yanow stated "With the exception of trumpeter Ferguson, there are few significant solos, and the big band mostly acts as an ensemble. Both Connor and MF were Kenton alumni, and there are moments where the orchestra reminds one of that band, but the focus is mostly on the singer ... although one wishes there was more interplay with the orchestra".

== Track listing ==
1. "Summertime" (George Gershwin, Ira Gershwin, DuBose Heyward) – 3:14
2. "I Only Have Eyes for You" (Al Dubin, Harry Warren) – 2:38
3. "It Never Entered My Mind" (Richard Rodgers, Lorenz Hart) – 5:09
4. "Two Ladies in de Shade of de Banana Tree" (Harold Arlen, Truman Capote) – 2:38
5. "Spring Can Really Hang You Up the Most" (Tommy Wolf, Fran Landesman) – 4:15
6. "The Lonesome Road" (Nathaniel Shilkret, Gene Austin) – 4:24
7. "All The Things You Are" (Jerome Kern, Oscar Hammerstein II) – 2:49
8. "Black Coffee" (Sonny Burke, Paul Francis Webster) – 3:41
9. "Happy New Year" (Gordon Jenkins, Chuck Collins) – 4:27
10. "That's How It Went All Right" (André Previn, Dory Langdon) – 3:10
- Recorded in New York City on December 5, 1960 (tracks 4, 6 & 9), December 14, 1960 (tracks 3, 5, 7 & 8) and January 23, 1961 (tracks 1, 2 & 10)

== Personnel ==
- Chris Connor – vocals
- Maynard Ferguson – trumpet, trombone, French horn
- Bill Berry, Rolf Ericson, Chet Ferretti – trumpet
- Kenny Rupp, Ray Winslow – trombone
- Lanny Morgan – alto saxophone, flute
- Willie Maiden – tenor saxophone, clarinet
- Joe Farrell – tenor saxophone, soprano saxophone, flute
- Frank Hittner – baritone saxophone, bass clarinet
- Jaki Byard – piano
- John Neves – bass
- Rufus Jones – drums
- Willie Maiden (tracks 5 & 7), Don Sebesky (tracks 1–4, 6 & 8–10) – arranger
