= Maynard Ferguson Plays Jazz for Dancing =

Studio album by Maynard Ferguson
- Released: 1959
- Recorded: February 23, 25, 26 and March 31, 1959; Capitol Studios, New York City
- Genre: Jazz
- Label: Roulette; R 52038
- Producer: Teddy Reig

Maynard Ferguson chronology
Swingin' My Way Through College (1958)	Maynard Ferguson Plays Jazz for Dancing (1959)	Newport Suite (1959)

Maynard Ferguson Plays Jazz for Dancing is an album released by Canadian jazz trumpeter Maynard Ferguson featuring tracks recorded in early 1959 and originally released on the Roulette label.

== Reception ==
Professional ratings
Review scores
Source	Rating
Allmusic	3/5 stars

Allmusic awarded the album 3 stars and states "Ferguson and his excellent orchestra purposely play it safe, performing pleasing but unadventurous music that is not as exciting as their more jazz-oriented sessions of the era".

== Track listing ==
1. "Hey There" (Jerry Ross, Richard Adler) – 2:58
2. "Where's Teddy" (Maynard Ferguson, Willie Maiden) – 2:37
3. "If I Should Lose You" (Ralph Rainger, Leo Robin) – 3:35
4. "I'll Be Seeing You" (Sammy Fain, Irving Kahal) – 2:25
5. "'Tis Autumn" (Henry Nemo) – 3:07
6. "Secret Love" (Fain, Paul Francis Webster) – 2:22
7. "I'm Beginning to See the Light" (Duke Ellington, Don George, Harry James, Johnny Hodges) – 2:38
8. "It Might as Well Be Spring" (Richard Rodgers, Oscar Hammerstein II) – 3:28
9. "Stompin' at the Savoy" (Edgar Sampson, Chick Webb, Benny Goodman, Andy Razaf) – 2:23
10. "'Round Midnight" (Thelonious Monk, Cootie Williams) – 3:10
11. "Soft Winds" (Goodman) – 3:31

== Personnel ==
- Maynard Ferguson – trumpet, valve trombone, euphonium
- Bill Chase, Don Ellis, Larry Moser – trumpet
- Don Sebesky – trombone, bass trombone
- Slide Hampton – trombone
- Jimmy Ford – alto saxophone
- Carmen Leggio, Willie Maiden – tenor saxophone
- John Lanni – baritone saxophone
- Bob Dogan – piano
- Jimmy Rowser – bass
- Frankie Dunlop – drums
- Slide Hampton, Willie Maiden, Don Sebesky – arrangers
