= Rufus "Speedy" Jones =

American drummer (1936–1990)

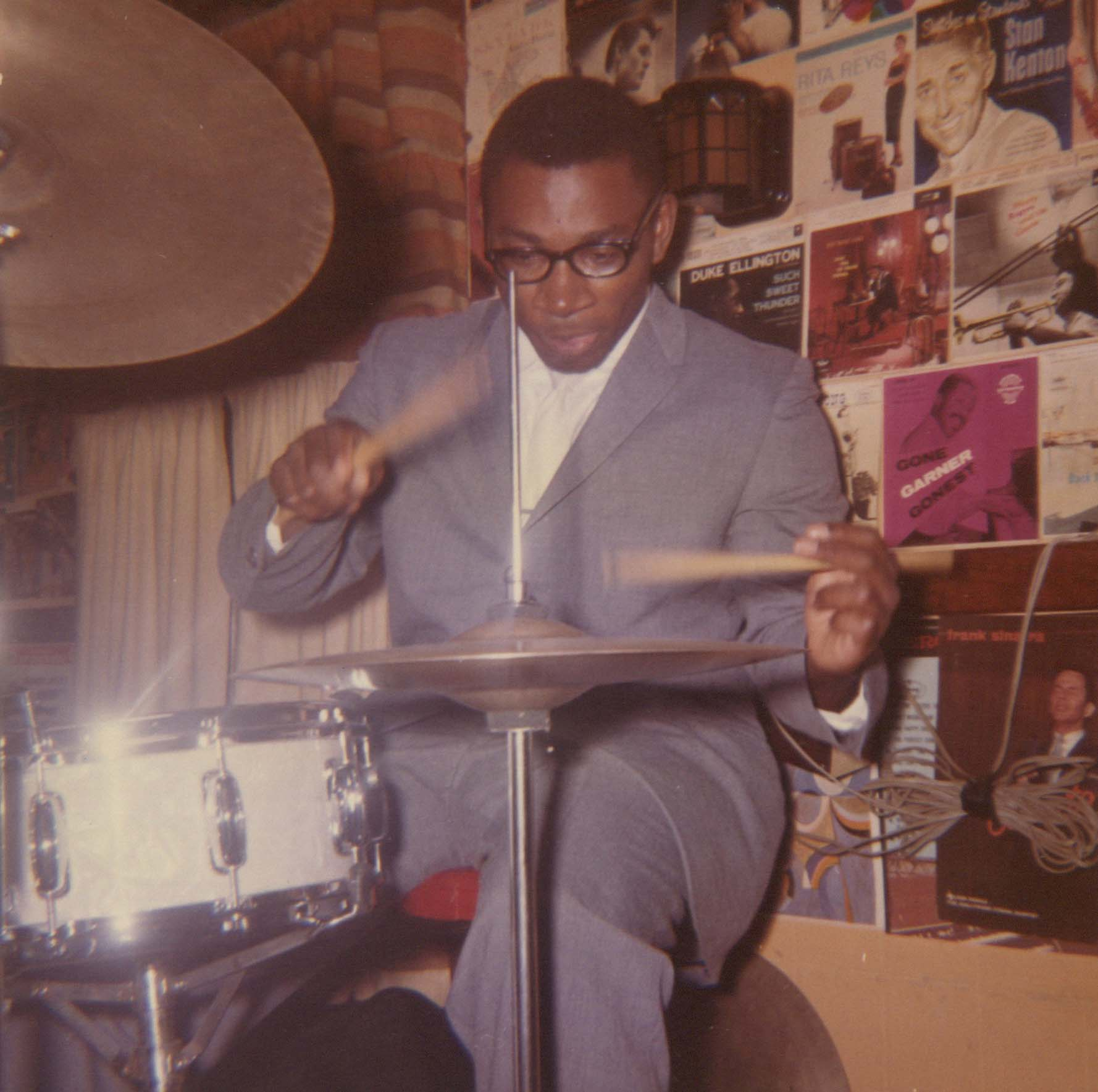
- Jones playing at Lennie's on the Turnpike in 1963

Background information
- Born: May 27, 1936; Charleston, South Carolina, U.S.
- Died: April 25, 1990 (aged 53)
- Genre: Jazz
- Occupation: Musician
- Instrument: Drums
- Years active: 1950s–1990
- Formerly of: Count Basie, Duke Ellington, Maynard Ferguson, Lionel Hampton, Red Allen, James Brown

Rufus "Speedy" Jones (May 27, 1936 – April 25, 1990) was an American jazz drummer from Charleston, South Carolina.

Starting out on trumpet, Jones switched to drums at the age of 13. He worked with Lionel Hampton in 1954 before being drafted. While stationed at Fort Jackson, Jones played in a quintet every Saturday night at the black United Service Organization clubhouse in Columbia. He later played with Red Allen and Maynard Ferguson's Orchestra (1959–1963). He led a quintet from 1963 to 1964, producing for Cameo Records his only album as a leader. Jones worked with Count Basie and Woody Herman in the mid-1960s and backed that up with Duke Ellington in the latter half of the decade.

Jones (various accounts concur) was forced to put down his sticks in 1973, due to the debilitating effects of early-onset arthritis. He died in 1990, after working as a porter at Caesar’s Palace Casino in Las Vegas.

Rufus' son, Lebrew, was sentenced in 1989 to 22 years to life for the murder of Michaelanne Hall, a prostitute in New York City. He was released on parole on November 19, 2009 after significant doubts were raised about his guilt.

== Discography ==
=== As leader ===
- Five on Eight (Cameo, 1964)

=== As sideman ===
With Count Basie

- Big Band Scene '65 (Roulette, 1965)
- Arthur Prysock/Count Basie (Verve, 1966)
- Basie's Beat (Verve, 1967)

With Duke Ellington

- The Far East Suite (RCA Victor, 1967)
- Latin American Suite (Fantasy, 1968)
- 70th Birthday Concert (Solid State, 1970)
- New Orleans Suite (Atlantic, 1971)
- The London Concert (United Artists, 1972)
- The Pianist (Fantasy, 1974)
- The Afro-Eurasian Eclipse (Fantasy, 1975)
- The Ellington Suites (Pablo, 1976)
- Up in Duke's Workshop (Pablo, 1979)

With Maynard Ferguson

- Let's Face the Music and Dance (Roulette, 1960)
- Maynard '61 (Roulette, 1961)
- Double Exposure with Chris Connor (Atlantic, 1961)
- Two's Company with Chris Connor (Roulette, 1961)
- "Straightaway" Jazz Themes (Roulette, 1961)
- Maynard '62 (Roulette, 1962)
- Si! Si! M.F. (Roulette, 1962)
- Maynard '63 (Roulette, 1962)
- Message from Maynard (Roulette, 1963)
- Maynard '64 (Roulette, 1963)
- The New Sounds of Maynard Ferguson (Cameo, 1963)
- Come Blow Your Horn (Cameo, 1963)

With others

- Al Grey, Shades of Grey (Tangerine, 1965)
- Lionel Hampton, Lionel Hampton Big Band (Clef, 1955)
- Lionel Hampton, Lionel Hampton (Amiga, 1976)
- Woody Herman, Woody Herman live at Newport Recorded Sunday 3 July 1966. Billed as Dr. Rufus 'Speedy' Jones (Jazz Band Records 1994 EBCD2118-2)
- Johnny Hodges, Triple Play (RCA Victor, 1967)
