= Roulette Records =

American record label

- Parent company: EMI (1989–2013); Warner Music Group (2013–present)
- Founded: 1957
- Founder: George Goldner; Joe Kolsky; Morris Levy; Phil Kahl
- Defunct: 1989
- Distributors: Blue Note Records (1989–2013); Rhino Entertainment (pop catalogue; North America); Parlophone (worldwide jazz; international pop catalogues)
- Genre: Various
- Country of origin: U.S.
- Location: New York City

Roulette Records was an American record company and label founded in 1957 by George Goldner, Joe Kolsky, Morris Levy, Morris Gurlek and Phil Kahl, with creative control given to producers and songwriters Hugo Peretti and Luigi Creatore. Levy was appointed director.

The label had known ties to New York City mobsters. Levy ran the label with an iron fist. In 1958 Roost Records was purchased. Goldner subsequently bowed out of his partnership interest in Roulette and, to cover his gambling debts, sold his record labels Tico, Rama, Gee and—years later—End and Gone to Levy, who grouped them into Roulette. Peretti and Creatore later left Roulette and worked as freelance producers for RCA Victor throughout the 1960s. They co-founded Avco Records in 1969. In 1971 Roulette took over the catalog of Jubilee Records.

== History ==
During the late 1950s, Roulette scored hits by Buddy Knox, Jimmy Bowen, the Playmates, Jimmie Rodgers, Ronnie Hawkins, the Delicates, and Frankie Lymon as well as releasing albums by Pearl Bailey, Dinah Washington and Count Basie.

During the early 1960s, Roulette issued recordings connected to the twist dance craze, such as "Peppermint Twist" by Joey Dee and the Starliters. They also released a rare album of "twist songs" by Bill Haley & His Comets, Twistin' Knights at the Roundtable. Other major 1960s hits for the label include "Two Faces Have I" by Lou Christie. A group of United States Marines called the Essex recorded the hit "Easier Said Than Done" while based at Camp Lejeune, NC, in 1963. In 1964, Stephen Stills and Richie Furay first recorded together on Roulette while in the nine-member Au Go Go Singers, the house band for the Cafe Au Go Go in New York City.

In the UK, Roulette's records were issued on EMI's Columbia label. In April 1965, the UK music magazine NME reported that Roulette had agreed to offer a sponsored show to the UK pirate radio radio station Radio Caroline. The hour-long show, recorded in the US by disc jockey Jack Spector, was to be broadcast five evenings a week. The contract covered a two-year period and was worth over £10,000 to the station.

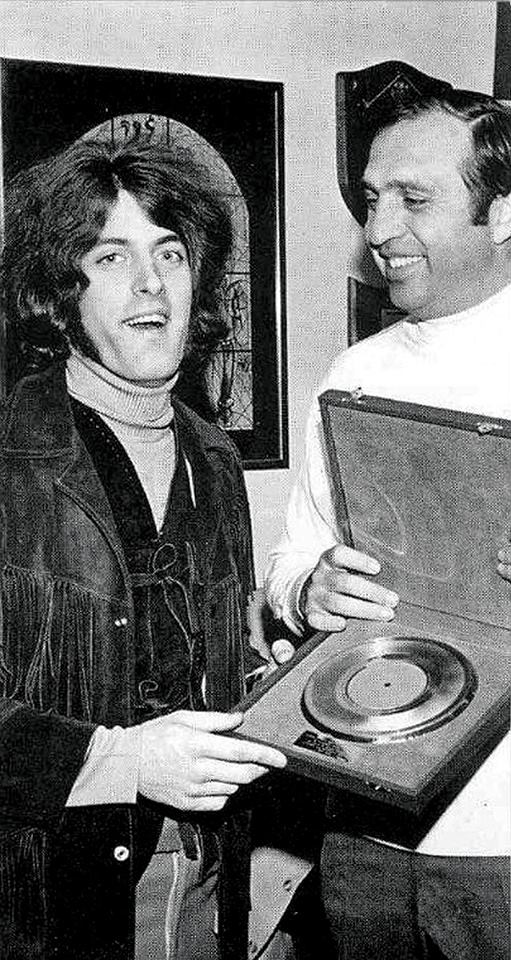
Tommy James (left) has stated that Morris Levy (right) hid royalties from the Shondells' biggest hits.

According to Tommy James of Tommy James and the Shondells, whose "Hanky Panky", "I Think We're Alone Now", "Mirage", "Mony Mony", "Crimson and Clover" and many others were released during his time at the label, Roulette was a front business for the Genovese crime family. His band was essentially forced into signing with the label after Jerry Wexler of Atlantic Records mentioned that Levy scared off competitors who had interest in the group, including Atlantic, by claiming "Hanky Panky". James estimates that the label kept $30 million-$40 million of the group's royalties but afforded it total artistic freedom, whereas another label would have tampered with its formula and might have dropped the group early on. Throughout the 1960s and 1970s, Roulette was one of the industry's major distributors, handling records for many leading labels.

Levy was the key financial backer for the rap music label Sugar Hill Records, which was founded in 1979 by the husband-and-wife team Joe and Sylvia Robinson. Sugar Hill released the first Top 40 rap single, "Rapper's Delight", in 1979. In the early 1980s, the Robinsons bought Levy out.

In 1981, Henry Stone turned to Levy to help prevent the demise of TK Records, so they set up Sunnyview Records under the Roulette umbrella. In 1986, Levy was arrested, tried and convicted for extorting money from an FBI informant, John LaMonte, but he died in Ghent, New York, before serving any time in prison. In 1989, Roulette Records was sold to a consortium of EMI and Rhino Records, the latter of which was later acquired by Warner Music Group. Rhino would control Roulette’s pop catalogue in the USA, Canada and Mexico, while EMI acquired Roulette’s jazz catalogue worldwide, plus the international distribution of Roulette’s pop catalogue. As of 2013, Warner Music Group now has worldwide rights to the Roulette catalogue as a result of acquiring EMI’s Parlophone label.

Following their 1989 acquisition, Rhino and EMI began issuing large royalty checks to former Roulette artists. Tommy James recalled that his checks were in amounts in six or seven digits. Roulette was notorious for not paying royalties to its artists, who had to rely on concerts and personal appearances for their income.

Until 2013, EMI used the Roulette name for the reissue of old Roulette-label material. In the US, Blue Note Records handled the Roulette jazz catalogue for release on the Roulette Jazz label until 2013. It was one of the units of Parlophone that Universal Music was required to sell to Warner Music Group to comply with international regulators.

== Roulette Records artists ==
- Alive N Kickin'
- Louis Armstrong
- Arzachel (US and Canada)
- Au Go Go Singers
- Pearl Bailey
- The Barry Sisters
- Count Basie
- Jimmy Bowen
- Jo Ann Campbell
- Cathy Carr
- Betty Carter
- Marilyn Chambers
- The Choir
- Lou Christie
- The Cleftones
- Dave "Baby" Cortez
- Sammy Davis, Jr.

- Joey Dee and the Starliters
- The Delicates
- The Detergents
- The Devotions
- Tom Rizzi
- Ecstasy, Passion & Pain
- Duane Eddy
- Harry "Sweets" Edison
- The Essex
- The Exciters
- Maynard Ferguson
- The Fireflys The Fireflies
- Bill Haley & His Comets
- Herman's Hermits
- Ronnie Hawkins
- The Hullaballoos
- Tommy James
- Tommy James & the Shondells
- Truth

- Jackie Kannon
- Buddy Knox
- Little Anthony & the Imperials
- Frankie Lymon
- Machito
- Deidre McCalla
- Lou Monte
- Jim Neske, aka Chance Eden
- Esther Phillips
- The Playmates
- The Regents
- The Rock-A-Teens
- Jimmie Rodgers
- Sam & Dave
- Jeri Southern
- The Teenagers
- The Three Degrees
- Sarah Vaughan
- Dinah Washington
- Joe Williams
- Eddie Palmieri
- Chuck Wood

== Discography ==
=== 25000 Popular Series ===
Roulette Records 25000 Popular Series of LP records began in 1957 and ran until 1968.

Catalog	Album	Artist	Notes
25001	Calypso with the Playmates	The Playmates	
25002	Barrelhouse	Moe Wechsler	
25003	Buddy Knox	Buddy Knox	
25004	Jimmy Bowen	Jimmy Bowen	
25005	Italy	The DiMara Sisters	
25006	Charleston	Bonnie Alden	
25007	Memories of Hal Kemp	Henry Jerome Orchestra	
25008	Showplace of the Nation	Radio City Music Hall Orchestra	
25009	Tyree Glenn at the Embers	Tyree Glenn	
25010	Dorothy Donegan at the Embers	Dorothy Donegan	
25011	Polka	Ted Tyle	
25012	Pearl Bailey A Broad	Pearl Bailey	
25013	Frankie Lymon at the London Palladium	Frankie Lymon	
25014	Kay Martin and Her Bodyguards	Kay Martin	
25015	Dixiecats	Jazz All Stars	
25016	Pearl Bailey Sings for Adults Only	Pearl Bailey	
25017	Copa Girl	Dori Anne Gray	
25018	Songs My Mother Loved	Milton Berle	
25019	Hi-Fi Harmonica	Leo Diamond	
25020	Jimmie Rodgers	Jimmie Rodgers	
25021	Pajama Party	Various Artists	
25022	Accordion in Hi-Fi	Jo Ann Castle	
25023	Musical Themes of Hollywood U.S.A.	Jack Schaindlin & Symphony of the Air	
25024	Let's Dance	Tony Pastor and Orchestra	
25025	Jamaica	Lennie Hayton	
25026	The Long Hot Summer (Soundtrack)	Alex North	
25027	Guy Pastor and His Dad	Tony Pastor and Orchestra	
25028	Italy Revisited	The DiMara Sisters with the Tony Dannon Orchestra	
25029	Curtain Going Up	Original Dukes of Dixieland	
25030	Gospel Songs	Stamps-Baxter Quartet	
25031	Let's Do the Polka	Ted Tyle Orchestra	
25032	Oriental Delight	Hank Mardigian Sextet	
25033	The Number One Ballads	Jimmie Rodgers	
25034	David Niven Reads the World's Most Famous Love Letters	David Niven	
25035	Cowboy	Foy Willing & the Riders of the Purple Sage	
25036	Rock 'n Roll	Frankie Lymon	
25037	St. Louis Blues	Pearl Bailey	
25038	Dixieland at Carnegie Hall	Various Artists	
25039	Coffee, Cigarettes and Memories	Jeri Southern	
25040	Emil Coleman at the Waldorf Astoria	Emil Coleman	
25041	With Love	Fernando Lamas	Two tracks arranged by Astor Piazzolla
25042	Jimmie Rodgers Sings Folk Songs	Jimmie Rodgers	
25043	At Play with the Playmates	The Playmates	
25044	When Good Fellows Get Together	Hugo & Luigi with Their Family Singers	
25045	Noro Morales at the Harvest Moon Ball	Noro Morales	
25046	Song Stylist Extraordinaire	Valerie Carr	
25047	On My Way to Heaven	Lee Russell & Wayfarers	
25048	Buddy Knox and Jimmy Bowen	Buddy Knox/Jimmy Bowen	Split album
25049	Greece	Peter Kara Orchestra	
25050	Tyree Glenn at the Roundtable	Tyree Glenn	
25051	Italia con Pier Angeli	Pier Angeli	
25052	A Long, Long Kiss	Canta Maya	
25053	Steve Allen at the Roundtable	Steve Allen	
25054	Love Songs a LaRosa	Julius LaRosa	
25055	La Guitarra: The Genius of Rolando Valdes-Blain	Rolando Valdes-Blain	
25056	Hello Nice People	Henry Jerome Orchestra	
25057	His Golden Year	Jimmie Rodgers	
25058	Swingin' My Way Through College	Maynard Ferguson Orchestra	
25059	Rock and Roll Record Hop	Various Artists	
25060	At Home with the Barry Sisters	The Barry Sisters	
25061	Emotions of Jose Duval	Jose Duval	Arranged by Astor Piazzolla
25062	Cha Cha Italiana	The DiMara Sisters	
25063	Pearl Bailey Sings Porgy and Bess and Other Gershwin Melodies	Pearl Bailey	
25064	Swingin' Marchin' Whistlin'	Buddy Williams and his Golden Echo Music	
25065	Lennie Hayton Introduces Scandinavian Suite No. 1	Lennie Hayton	
25066	Hawaiian Luau	William Kealoha Orchestra	
25067	Woody Herman Sextet at the Roundtable	Woody Herman Sextet	
25068	Cuttin' Capers	The Playmates	
25069	Honky Tonk Piano	Moe Wechsler	
25070	Dixieland in High Society	Don Redman and the Knights of the Roundtable	
25071	TV Favorites Volume 1	Jimmie Rodgers	
25072	Basie Swings, Bennett Sings	Count Basie and Tony Bennett	
25073	Themes from the Hip	Bud Wattles Orchestra	
25074	Folk Songs of Sonny Terry and Brownie McGhee	Sonny Terry and Brownie McGhee	
25075	Try a Little Tenderness	Tyree Glenn with Strings	
25076	Turk Murphy and His Jazz Band at the Roundtable	Turk Murphy and His Jazz Band	
25077	Shy	Cathy Carr	
25078	Ronnie Hawkins	Ronnie Hawkins	
25079	It Seems Like Only Yesterday	Hal McIntyre Orchestra	
25080	Dixieland at the Roundtable	Salt City Six	
25081	Twilight on the Trail	Jimmie Rodgers	
25082	Joe Reisman Salutes the All-Time Instrumental Favorites	Joe Reisman	
25083	On the Sunny Side	Julius LaRosa	
25084	Broadway Show Stoppers	The Playmates	
25085	Go Ahead & Rock Rock Rock	Buddy Johnson Orchestra featuring Ella Johnson	
25086	Shepherd and His Flock	Bill Shepherd Orchestra	
25087	Happy Organ	Bob Wyatt	
25088	Music for Wise Guys	Turk Murphy	
25089	Great American Waltzes	Joe Reisman	
25090	Born to Be Blue	Anne Phillips	
25091	Jack Teagarden at the Roundtable	Jack Teagarden	
25092	Relax'n with Chico Randall	Chico Randall	
25093	Rock n' Roll Bandstand	Various Artists	
25094	Ev'ry Hour, Ev'ry Day	Valerie Carr	
25095	It's Christmas Once Again	Jimmie Rodgers	
25096	Memorie di Roma	The DiMara Sisters	Arranged by Astor Piazzolla
25097	Christmas Carols	St. Patrick's Cathedral Choir	
25098	On the Beach (Soundtrack)	Ernest Gold	Musical Score from the film.
25099	Sounds in the Night	Sam Marowitz	
25100	Marc of Fredericks	Marc Fredericks and Orchestra	
25101	More Songs for Adults Only	Pearl Bailey	
25102	Mr. Dynamo	Ronnie Hawkins	
25103	When the Spirit Moves You	Jimmie Rodgers	
25104	Once More with Feeling	Billy Eckstine	
25105	Polka! Polka! Polka!	Kenny Bass	
25106	Original Hit Records	Various Artists	
25107	A Thousand Miles Away	The Heartbeats	
25108	Salute Italia	Al Caiola	
25109	Woo Hoo	The Rock-A-Teens	
25110	On Stage	Alan Gale	
25111	Island Paradise	William Kealoha Orchestra	
25112	Dixieland at the Roundtable	Sharkey Bonano	
25113	Smooth and Rocky	Rocky Cole with the Al Cohn Orchestra	
25114	Instrumental Imports	Joe Reisman	
25115	Let's Have a Ball	Tyree Glenn	
25116	Songs of the Bad Old Days	Pearl Bailey	
25117	Accent Italino	The DiMara Sisters	
25118	Las Vegas Late Show	Jack Ross Quartet	
25119	Jazz Maverick	Jack Teagarden	
25120	The Folk Ballads of Ronnie Hawkins	Ronnie Hawkins	
25121	Folk Scene U.S.A.	The Cumberland Three	
25122	Neapolitan Memories	Doreen	
25123	Jimmy Durante at the Copacabana	Jimmy Durante	
25124	Ivory and Bone	Al Lerner	
25125	Naughty But Nice	Pearl Bailey	
25126	Italiano U.S.A.	Lou Monte	
25127	New Sensations in Sound	Lou Monte	
25128	At Home with Jimmie Rodgers: An Evening of Folk Songs	Jimmie Rodgers	
25129	Swings for Dancers	Richard Maltby	
25130	Sing Along with Emmett Kelly	Emmett Kelly	
25131	Banjo & Calls Sing Along	Various Artists	
25132	Civil War Almanac Volume 1: The Yankees	The Cumberland Three	
25133	Civil War Almanac Volume 2: The Rebels	The Cumberland Three	
25134	Italy Volume 2	The DiMara Sisters	
25135	Voice of Hawaii	William Kealoha	
25136	Side by Side	The Barry Sisters	
25137	Ronnie Hawkins Sings the Songs of Hank Williams	Ronnie Hawkins	
25138	Tyree Glenn at London House in Chicago	Tyree Glenn	
25139	Wait for Me	The Playmates	
25140	In Love for the Very First Time	Wanda Stafford	
25141	It's Happy Polka Time	Kenny Bass & His Polka Poppers	
25142	St. Patrick's Cathedral Choir Sings Christmas Songs	St. Patrick's Cathedral Choir	
25143	You Talk Too Much	Joe Jones	
25144	The Best of Pearl Bailey	Pearl Bailey	
25145	Fidoodlin'	Spade Cooley	
25146	Grimm's Hip Fairy Tales	Mort Linsey	
25148	Swing Folksongs	Richard Maltby	
25149	That's Paris	Tony Osborne Orchestra	
25150	The Folk Song World of Jimmie Rodgers	Jimmie Rodgers	
25151	Melodie O'Italia	The DiMara Sisters	
25152	Dream Bar	Willie Restum	
25153	Return to Rome	Rudy Adamo	
25154	It Happened One Night	Dorothy Donegan	
25155	Pearl Bailey Sings Songs of Harold Arlen	Pearl Bailey	
25156	We Belong Together	The Barry Sisters	
25157	Shalom	The Barry Sisters	
25159	Murray the "K's" Sing Along with the Original Golden Gassers!	Various Artists	
25160	The Best of Jimmie Rodgers Folk Songs	Jimmie Rodgers	
25161	My Name...Jose Jimenez	Bill Dana	
25162	Pat Harrington, Jr. as Guido Panzini and Bill Dana as Kookie as Ever	Pat Harrington, Jr. and Bill Dana	
25163	Enzo Stuarti	Enzo Stuarti	
25164	The Gospel in Words & Music	Rev. Adam Clayton Powell	
25165	Top Polka Million Sellers	Kenny Bass & His Orchestra	
25166	Doin' the Twist at the Peppermint Lounge	Joey Dee and the Starliters	
25167	Happy Sounds	Pearl Bailey with the Louis Bellson Orchestra	
25168	Hey, Let's Twist	Various Artists	
25169	Twistin' at the Roundtable with the Orchids	The Orchids	
25170	Dinah '62	Dinah Washington	
25171	All the World is Twistin	Joey Dee and the Starliters	
25172	Twistin' at the Miami Beach Peppermint Lounge	Seven Blends	
25173	Back at the Peppermint Lounge	Joey Dee and the Starliters	
25174	Twistin' Knights at the Roundtable	Bill Haley and His Comets	
25175	Let's All Twist at Peppermint Lounge	Dale Hawkins and His Escapades	
25176	The Most of the Twist	Various Artists	
25177	The Dixie Sound of Jack Teagarden	Jack Teagarden	
25178	Brilliant Big Band Ballads and Blues	Richard Maltby	
25179	15 Million Sellers	Jimmie Rodgers	
25180	In Love	Dinah Washington	
25181	Come On, Let's Play with Pearlie Mae	Pearl Bailey	
25182	Two Tickets To Paris (Soundtrack)	Various Artists	
25183	Drinking Again	Dinah Washington	
25184	The Trombone Artistry of Tyree Glenn	Tyree Glenn	
25185	This Was Burlesque	Ann Corio	Original Cast Album
25186	How to Strip for Your Husband	Ann Corio	Orchestra conducted by Sonny Lester
25187	Songs for the John	Jackie Kannon	
25188	Hit Movie Themes in Italiano	The DiMara Sisters	
25189	Back to the Blues	Dinah Washington	
25190	Modern Dance Band Sounds of Country & Western Hits	Sonny Lester Orchestra	
25191	Murray the K Presents Golden Gassers for Hand Holders	Various Artists	
25192	Murray the K Presents Golden Gassers for a Dance Party	Various Artists	
25193	Bossa Nova	Tito Puente	
25195	About Good Little Girls and Bad Little Boys	Pearl Bailey	
25196	The Next One Will Kill You	Morey Amsterdam	
25197	Joey Dee	Joey Dee	
25198	The Barry Sisters in Israel	The Barry Sisters	
25199	Folk Songs	Jimmie Rodgers	
25200	Lowdown Back Porch Blues	Louisiana Red	
25201	The Funniest New Comic Since the Last New Comic	Dave Turner	
25202	How to Belly Dance for Your Husband and His Friends	Little Egypt and the Sonny Lester Orchestra	
25203	At Home with That Other Family	Leonard Gaines and Gwen Davis	
25204	Tapped Wires	Will Jordan and Rhonda Brown	
25205	Don Sherman at the Playboy Club	Don Sherman	
25206	Bossa Nova Italian Style	The DiMara Sisters	
25207	Golden Goodies Volume 1	Various Artists	
25208	Lou Christie	Lou Christie	
25209	Golden Goodies Volume 4: Goodies for a Dance Party	Various Artists	
25210	Golden Goodies Volume 2	Various Artists	
25211	Golden Goodies Volume 3	Various Artists	
25212	Golden Goodies Volume 7	Various Artists	
25213	Golden Goodies Volume 9	Various Artists	
25214	Golden Goodies Volume 8	Various Artists	
25215	Golden Goodies Volume 5	Various Artists	
25216	Golden Goodies Volume 6	Various Artists	
25217	Golden Goodies Volume 10	Various Artists	
25218	Golden Goodies Volume 12	Various Artists	
25219	Golden Goodies Volume 11	Various Artists	
25220	Dinah '63	Dinah Washington	
25221	Dance-Dance-Dance	Joey Dee	
25222	"C'est la vie"	Pearl Bailey	
25223	Old Country Polka	Kenny Bass	
25224	More How to Strip for Your Husband	Ann Corio	Orchestra conducted by Sonny Lester
25225	More How to Belly Dance for Your Husband	Little Egypt	Orchestra conducted by Sonny Lester
25228	Rendezvous in Istanbul	The Gomidas Band	
25229	Rendezvous in Greece	The Gomidas Band	
25230	Rendezvous in Armenia	The Gomidas Band	
25231	Strike Up the Band	Tony Bennett and Count Basie	Reissue of 25072 with different track order
25232	Ragtime U.S.A	Ralph Sutton	
25233	Gospel Concert: The Ward Singers Recorded Live	Clara Ward	
25234	Easier Said Than Done	The Essex	
25235	A Walkin' Miracle	The Essex	
25236	And Now...The Missing Otis Trio	The Missing Otis Trio	
25237	Meetin'	The Followers	
25238	Instrumental Golden Goodies Volume 13	Various Artists	
25239	Golden Goodies Volume 14	Various Artists	
25240	Golden Goodies Volume 15	Various Artists	
25241	Golden Goodies Volume 16	Various Artists	
25242	Golden Goodies Volume 17	Various Artists	
25243	Portrait of Mr. T	Jack Teagarden	
25244	In Tribute	Dinah Washington	
25245	Organ Dynamics	Bob Wyatt	
25246	Young and Lively	The Essex featuring Anita Humes	
25247	Golden Goodies of 1963 Volume 18	Various Artists	
25248	Your Favorite Groups and Their Golden Goodies Volume 19	Various Artists	
25249	20 Original Winners Volume 1	Various Artists	
25250	Jerry Blavatt Presents the Teenagers featuring Frankie Lymon	The Teenagers	
25251	20 Original Winners Volume 2	Various Artists	
25252	Hootenanny Nashville	Gene & Jerry	
25253	A Stranger on Earth	Dinah Washington	
25254	Good Guy Jack Spector Presents 22 Original Winners	Various Artists	
25255	The Best of Ronnie Hawkins	Ronnie Hawkins	
25256	Golden Goodies Goodies	Various Artists	
25257	The Magic World of Italy	Various Artists	
25258	The World of the Barry Sisters	The Barry Sisters	
25259	The Risque World of Pearl Bailey	Pearl Bailey	
25260	The World of Dinah Washington	Dinah Washington	
25261	The World of Jack Teagarden	Jack Teagarden	
25262	Music to Stop Smoking By	Sal Salvador Quartet	
25263	20 Original Winners Volume 3	Various Artists	
25264	20 Original Winners Volume 4	Various Artists	
25265	Melodie d'Italia	The DiMara Sisters	
25266	Polish Songs	Ray Budzilek	
25267	Yiddish Songs	Patsy Abbott	
25268	Wedding Polkas	Kenny Bass	
25269	Dinah Washington	Dinah Washington	Compilation
25270	What's New	The New Group	
25271	Songs by James Van Heusen	Pearl Bailey	
25272	Let's Go Bobo!	Willie Bobo	
25273	WFUN Good Guys	Various Artists	
25274	Drums!, Drums!, Drums!	Olatunji	
25275	Rockin' in the 25th Century	The Spacemen	
25276	My Fair Lady Goes Latin	Tito Puente	
25277	Race!	Sandy Baron	
25278	By Jupiter & Girl Crazy	Jackie Cain & Roy Kral	
25279	Polynesian Rendezvous	Daphne Walker and George Tumahai	
25280	They Call Us Au Go-Go Singers	The Au Go-Go Singers	
25281	Love Songs from a Cop	Joe E. Ross	
25282	Songs I Sang with Guy Lombardo	Kenny Gardner	
25283	Cascading Voices	Hugo & Luigi	
25284	I Sing in a Pub	Kim Cordell	
25285	Jewish Folk Songs	Joey Adams and Sholom Secunda	
25286	More Italian Songs Mama Never Taught	Nicola Paone	
25287	More Polish Songs Mama Never Taught	Ray Budzilek	
25288	Greek Songs Mama Never Taught Me	The Four Coins	
25289	The Best of Dinah Washington	Dinah Washington	
25290	20 All Time No. 1 Hits	Various Artists	
25291	WMAK Jet Set-22 Winners	Various Artists	
25292	Life with Liz and Dick	Heywood Kling	
25293	20 Original Winners of 1964	Various Artists	
25294	The Greatest Hits of Little Anthony and the Imperials	Little Anthony and the Imperials	
25295	WHK Good Guys	Various Artists	
25297	England's Newest Singing Sensations	The Hullaballoos	
25298	Organ Shindig	Dave "Baby" Cortez	
25299	And Now	Rudy Valentyne	
25300	For Women Only	Pearl Bailey	
25301	More of Frankie Randall	Frankie Randall	
25302	The Tiffiny Singers	The Tiffiny Singers	
25303	50 Best Loved Italian Songs	The DiMara Sisters	
25304	20 "Big Boss" Favorites: 10 Great Hits of 1964 - 10 Great Oldies Hits	Various Artists	
25306	Music of the Middle East	The John Berberian Ensemble	
25307	WING Lively Guys	Various Artists	
25308	The Many Faces of the Detergents	The Detergents	
25309	Polka Spectaculars	Kenny Bass and his Polka Poppers	
25310	The Hullaballoos On Hullabaloo	The Hullaballoos	
25311	German Songs Mama Taught Me	Duke Marsic	
25312	Live from the Ratfink Room	Jackie Kannon	
25313	Sincerely	Derek Martin	
25314	Tales	The Dixie Drifters	
25315	Tweetie Pie	Dave "Baby" Cortez	
25316	Shame and Scandal in the Family	Shawn Elliott	
25317	The Detective	Don Adams	
25318	Searching the Gospel	Pearl Bailey	
25320	Polish Songs Mama Never Taught Me	Ray Budzilek	
25321	Slovenian Songs Mama Taught Me	Duke Marsic and His Happy Slovenians	
25322	Music for Batman and Robin	The Spacemen	
25323	Sam and Dave	Sam & Dave	
25324	Live at the Taft	Charlie Drew	
25325	Polka Memories	Kenny Bass & Polka Team	
25326	The Exciters	The Exciters	
25328	Dave "Baby" Cortez In Orbit	Dave "Baby" Cortez	
25329	Etta Jones Sings	Etta Jones	With Junior Mance, Kenny Burrell, Frank Wess, Joe Newman, Milt Hinton
25330	Honky Tonk a-la Mod!	Bill Doggett	
25331	Strike Up the Band	Tony Bennett & Count Basie	
25332	Lou Christie Strikes Again	Lou Christie	Stereo reissue of Lou Christie Strikes Back
25333	WWIN Astro Jocks Present 20 Original Winners	Various Artists	
25334	This Hombre Called Lemon	Ken Lemon	
25336	Hanky Panky	Tommy James and the Shondells	
25337	WOL- Soul Brothers	Various Artists	
25338	K-BOX Dusty Discs	Various Artists	
25339	The Matadors Meet the Bull	Sonny Stitt	
25343	What's New!!!	Sonny Stitt	
25344	It's Only Love	Tommy James and the Shondells	
25245	Man in Love	Steve Rossi	
25346	I Keep Comin' Back!	Sonny Stitt	
25347	Color Me OBG: Station WDRC	Various Artists	
25348	KGFJ Sounds of Success	Various Artists	
25349	Canzone D'Amore	Ray Allen	
25350	Our Anniversary	Shep and the Limelites	
25351	Aqui Se Habla Espanol	Johnny Richards	
25352	Songs of My People	Tova Ronni	
25353	I Think We're Alone Now	Tommy James and the Shondells	
25354	Parallel-a-Stitt	Sonny Stitt	
25355	Something Special! The Best of Tommy James and the Shondells	Tommy James and the Shondells	
25356	Ma Vie	Steve Rossi	
25357	Gettin' Together	Tommy James and the Shondells	
25358	The Fallen Angels	The Fallen Angels	
25359	Don't Walk, Dance!	Carlos Malcolm	
25360	This Is My Song	Ray Allen	
25361	The Big Three Featuring Cass Elliot	The Big Three	

=== 42000 Pop series ===
Catalog	Album	Artist	Notes
42000	The Big Three Featuring Cass Elliot	The Big Three	Reissue of 25361
42001	The Spanish Side of Jazz	Candido, Machito and Willie Bobo	
42002	Back On Broadway	Pearl Bailey	
42003	Very Special Envoy	Very Special Envoy	
42004	Cole Porter Songbook	Pearl Bailey	
42005	Something Special! The Best of Tommy James and the Shondells	Tommy James and the Shondells	reissue of 25355
42006	Yours Truly	Jimmie Rodgers	
42007	Forever Yours	Little Anthony and the Imperials	
42008	Roman Guitar	Al Caiola	
42009	Fantail	Bobby Watson	
42010	The Rabble	The Rabble	
42011	It's A Long Way Down	The Fallen Angels	
42012	Mony, Mony	Tommy James & the Shondells	
42013	Lalolé: The Latin Sound of Lalo Schifrin	Lalo Schifrin	reissue of Tico Records LP
42014	The Best of Dinah Washington	Dinah Washington	
42015	The Kid from Red Bank	Count Basie	
42016	A Man Ain't Supposed to Cry	Joe Williams	
42017	Count Basie & Billy Eckstine	Count Basie and Billy Eckstine	
42018	Count Basie & Sarah Vaughan	Count Basie and Sarah Vaughan	
42019	You're Mine, You	Sarah Vaughan	
42020	How to Strip for Your Husband	Ann Corio	reissue of 25186
42021	How to Belly Dance for Your Husband	Little Egypt & Sonny Lester Orchestra	reissue of 25202
42022	Let's Sing Yiddish	original cast	
42023	Crimson and Clover	Tommy James and the Shondells	
42024	The Queen Does Her Thing	La Lupe	
42025	Don Cooper	Don Cooper	
42026	Mario Bertolino Sings Songs of Naples	Mario Bertolino	
42027	Remember How Great, Vol. 1	Various Artists	
42028	Remember How Great, Vol. 2	Various Artists	
42029	Remember How Great, Vol. 3	Various Artists	
42030	Cellophane Symphony	Tommy James and the Shondells	
42031	Remember How Great, Vol. 4	Various Artists	
42032	Remember How Great, Vol. 5	Various Artists	
42034	This Time	Mario Bertolino	
42035	Make Someone Happy	Sonny Stitt	
42036	Arzachel	Arzachel	
42037	Charisma	Charisma	
42038	Thundertree	Thundertree	
42039	Clarence "Frogman" Henry is Alive and Well Living in New Orleans	Clarence Henry	
42040	The Best of Tommy James and The Shondells	Tommy James and the Shondells	
42041	Alan Freed's Memory Lane	Various Artists	reissue of End 314
42042	Alan Freed's Top 15	Various Artists	reissue of End 315
42043	Roots and Branches	Don Crawford	
42044	Travelin'	Tommy James and the Shondells	
42045	The Best of Ronnie Hawkins Featuring His Band	Ronnie Hawkins	
42046	Bless The Children	Don Cooper	
42047	Morganmasondowns	Morgan Mason Downs	
42048	Stardust	Sonny Stitt	
42049	Morning Dew	Morning Dew	
42050	Maybe	The Three Degrees	
42051	Tommy James	Tommy James	
42052	Alive N Kickin'	Alive N Kickin'	
42053	George Nardello	George Nardello	
42054	Beasts and Fiends	Charisma	
42055	Would You Understand My Nakedness?	Don Crawford	
42056	Ballad of C.P. Jones	Don Cooper	
42057	Hog Heaven	Hog Heaven	
42058	Dust Bowl Clementine	Dust Bowl	
42060	Brand X	Oscar Brand	
42061	Rosko Reads the Giving Tree and Other Selected Poems	William (Rosko) Mercer	
42062	Christian of the World	Tommy James	
42063	Babatunde Olatunji	Babatunde Olatunji	

=== 3000 Pop Series ===
Catalog	Album	Artist	Notes
3001	Christian of the World	Tommy James	
3002	Ilmo Smokehouse	Ilmo Smokehouse	
3003	The Best of Basie	Count Basie & His Orchestra	
3004	Harlem River Drive	Harlem River Drive	
3005	Another Shade of Black	Don Crawford	
3006	Murmur of the Heart	Soundtrack	
3007	My Head, My Bed and My Red Guitar	Tommy James and the Shondells	
3008	Very Special Love	Tony Darrow	
3009	What You Feel is How You Grow	Don Cooper	
3010	Now We're Even	Clinic	
3011	Fluff	Fluff	
3012	Fur Coats and Blue Jeans	Deidre McCalla	
3013	Ecstasy, Passion & Pain	Ecstasy, Passion & Pain	
3014	Truth	Truth	
3015	So Much Love	The Three Degrees	
3016	Out Among Em'	Love Child's Afro Cuban Blues Band	
3017	Way to No. 1	Poison	
3018	Sunshine	Sunshine	
3019	The Atomic Mr. Basie	Count Basie	
3020	Transformed	Trini Lopez	

=== Birdland Jazz Series ===
The Roulette 52000 Birdland Series of 12 inch LPs commenced in 1958 and consists of 124 album releases over 10 years.

Catalog	Album	Artist	Notes
52001	Life Is a Many Splendored Gig	Herb Pomeroy Orchestra	
52002	Appearing Nightly	Mitchell-Ruff Duo	
52003	Basie	Count Basie Orchestra	aka E=MC^{2} and The Atomic Mr. Basie
52004	Movin' In	Specs Powell & Co.	
52005	A Man Ain't Supposed to Cry	Joe Williams	
52006	Kenya-Afro Cuban Jazz	Machito & His Orchestra	
52007	Count Basie Presents Eddie Davis Trio + Joe Newman	Eddie Davis Trio and Joe Newman	
52008	The Rites of Diablo	Johnny Richards	
52009	Locking Horns	Joe Newman & Zoot Sims	Rerelease of Rama Records LP
52010	Southern Breeze	Jeri Southern	
52011	Basie Plays Hefti	Count Basie & Orchestra	
52012	A Message from Newport	Maynard Ferguson	
52013	Mitchell-Ruff Duo Plus Strings and Brass	Mitchell-Ruff Duo	
52014	Joe Newman with Woodwinds	Joe Newman	
52015	Monday Night at Birdland	Hank Mobley, Curtis Fuller, Billy Root and Lee Morgan	
52016	Jeri Southern Meets Johnny Smith	Jeri Southern	
52017	'Round Midnight	Dee Lawson	
52018	Sing Along with Basie	Count Basie, Joe Williams, Lambert, Hendricks & Ross	
52019	Eddie Davis Trio Featuring Shirley Scott, Organ	Eddie Davis Trio	
52020	Sweet Talk	Kitty White	
52021	Memories Ad-Lib	Count Basie & Joe Williams	
52022	Another Monday Night at Birdland	Hank Mobley, Curtis Fuller, Billy Root and Lee Morgan	
52023	Sweetenings	Harry "Sweets" Edison	
52024	Basie One More Time	Count Basie Orchestra	
52025	Jazz for Juniors	Mitchell-Ruff Duo	
52026	Machito with Flute to Boot	Machito	
52027	A Message from Birdland	Maynard Ferguson Orchestra	
52028	Breakfast Dance and Barbecue	Count Basie and His Orchestra featuring Joe Williams	
52029	Basie/Eckstine Incorporated	Count Basie & Billy Eckstine	
52030	Joe Williams Sings About You	Joe Williams	
52031	Piano Portraits by Phineas Newborn	Phineas Newborn, Jr.	
52032	Chairman of the Board	Count Basie	
52033	Everyday I Have the Blues	Joe Williams with Count Basie and His Orchestra	
52034	Jazz Mission to Moscow	Mitchell-Ruff Duo	
52035	Illinois Jacquet Plays Cole Porter	Illinois Jacquet	
52036	Dance Along with Basie	Count Basie and His Orchestra	
52037	The Sound of Music	Mitchell-Ruff Duo	
52038	Maynard Ferguson Plays Jazz for Dancing	Maynard Ferguson	
52039	That Kind of Woman	Joe Williams	
52040	England's Ambassador of Jazz	Johnny Dankworth	
52041	Patented by Edison	Harry "Sweets" Edison Quintet	
52042	In the Vernacular	John Handy III	
52043	I Love a Piano	Phineas Newborn, Jr.	
52044	Not Now, I'll Tell You When	Count Basie	
52045	School of Rebellion	Bill Russo	
52046	Dreamy	Sarah Vaughan	
52047	Newport Suite	Maynard Ferguson	
52048	My Crying Hour	Cora Lee Day	
52049	Gretsch Drum Night at Birdland	Various Artists	
52050	The Most Volume 1	Various Artists	
52051	String Along with Basie	Count Basie	
52052	No Cover, No Minimum	Billy Eckstine	
52053	The Most Volume 2	Various Artists	
52054	Just the Blues	Joe Williams & Count Basie	
52055	Let's Face the Music and Dance	Maynard Ferguson	
52056	Kansas City Suite	Count Basie & His Orchestra	
52057	The Most Volume 3	Various Artists	
52058	No Coast Jazz	John Handy Quartet	
52059	Collaboration	Johnny Dankworth	
52060	The Divine One	Sarah Vaughan	
52061	Count Basie/Sarah Vaughan	Sarah Vaughan & Count Basie	
52062	The Most Volume 4	Various Artists	
52063	Seven Deadly Sins	Bill Russo	
52064	Maynard '61	Maynard Ferguson	
52065	Basie at Birdland	Count Basie	
52066	Sentimental and Melancholy	Joe Williams	
52067	Gretsch Drum Night Volume 2	Various Artists	
52068	Two's Company	Maynard Ferguson & Chris Connor	
52069	Together	Joe Williams & Harry "Sweets" Edison	
52070	After Hours	Sarah Vaughan	
52071	Have a Good Time with Joe Williams	Joe Williams	
52072	Count Basie Swings, Tony Bennett Sings	Count Basie & Tony Bennett	
52074	Together for the First Time	Louis Armstrong & Duke Ellington	
52075	The Most Volume 5	Various Artists	
52076	"Straightaway" Jazz Themes	Maynard Ferguson	
52078	Conga Soul	Candido	
52079	Soul Brother	Harold Corbin	
52080	A Night at Count Basie's	Lee Perri Trio	
52081	The Best of Basie	Count Basie	
52082	You're Mine You	Sarah Vaughan	
52083	Maynard '62	Maynard Ferguson	
52084	Si! Si! M.F.	Maynard Ferguson	
52085	Swingin' Night at Birdland	Joe Williams	
52086	The Legend	Count Basie	
52087	Big Band Jazz from the Summit	Louis Bellson	
52088	Lalo = Brilliance	Lalo Schifrin	
52089	The Best of Basie Vol. 2	Count Basie	
52090	Maynard '63	Maynard Ferguson	
52091	Snowbound	Sarah Vaughan	
52092	The Explosive Side of Sarah Vaughan	Sarah Vaughan	
52093	Back to Basie & the Blues	Count Basie Orchestra & Joe Williams	Compilation
52094	The Best of Birdland Volume 1	John Coltrane / Lee Morgan	split album
52095	Skin Burns	Ron Burns	
52096	Jazz from Abroad	Johnny Dankworth	
52097	Bobo's Beat	Willie Bobo	
52098	The Mighty Two	Louis Bellson & Gene Krupa	
52099	Basie in Sweden	Count Basie	
52100	Star Eyes	Sarah Vaughan	
52101	Message from Maynard	Maynard Ferguson	
52102	One Is a Lonesome Number	Joe Williams	
52103	The Great Reunion	Louis Armstrong & Duke Ellington	
52104	The Lonely Hours	Sarah Vaughan	
52105	New Kind of Love	Joe Williams	
52106	Easin' It	Count Basie	
52107	Maynard '64	Maynard Ferguson	
52108	We Three	Sarah Vaughan, Dinah Washington, & Joe Williams	
52109	The World of Sarah Vaughan	Sarah Vaughan	
52110	The World of Maynard Ferguson	Maynard Ferguson	
52111	The World of Basie Volume 1	Count Basie	
52112	Sweet 'n' Sassy	Sarah Vaughan	
52113	Back with Basie	Count Basie	
52114	My Fair Lady	Johnny Richards	
52115	The Return of Bud Powell	Bud Powell	
52116	Sarah Sings Soulfully	Sarah Vaughan	
52117	Big Band Scene '65	Count Basie/Maynard Ferguson	
52118	Sarah + 2	Sarah Vaughan	
52119	Live!	Billy Strayhorn	
52120	Explorations	Louis Bellson/Lalo Schifrin	
52121	Jazz	John Handy	
52122	Afro-Jazziac	Herbie Mann & Machito	
52123	Sarah Slightly Classical	Sarah Vaughan	
52124	Quote, Unquote	John Handy	Compilation

=== 5000 Jazz Series ===
Catalog	Album	Artist	Notes
5000	Finally, Betty Carter	Betty Carter	
5001	'Round Midnight	Betty Carter	
5002	Stardust	Sonny Stitt	Reissue of What's New!!
5003	Backgammon	Art Blakey and the Jazz Messengers	
5004	Songs of the Bad Old Days	Pearl Bailey	
5005	Now It's My Turn	Betty Carter	
5006	The Nonet	Lee Konitz	
5007	Evening Breeze	Leo Wright	
5008	Gypsy Folk Tales	Art Blakey and the Jazz Messengers	
5009	Estimated Time of Arrival	Bobby Watson	

=== 2-LP Birdland Series ===
Catalog	Album	Artist	Notes
1	The Count Basie Story	Count Basie	
2	The Birdland Story	Various Artists	

=== 500 Comedy Series ===
Catalog	Album	Artist	Notes
501	Saloon Society	Bill Manville	
502	Prose from the Cons	Jackie Kannon and the Convicts of Southern Michigan Prison	
503			
504			
505	Live!	Jackie Kannon	
506	Let's Play Strike!	Transit Strike Interviews	
507	The Truth About the Green Hornet	Marty Allen and Steve Rossi	

=== 800 Soundtrack Series ===
All of the soundtracks in this series were for films released in the United States during 1966.

Catalog	Album	Artist	Notes
801	A Study in Terror	John Scott	
802	The Russian Adventure	Aleksandr Lokshin	
803	Sleeping Beauty	Boris Khaykin	
804	The Peach Thief	Simeon Pironkov	
805	Four in the Morning	John Barry	

=== 80000 Original Cast Series ===
Catalog	Album	Artist	Notes
80001	Showgirl: Carol Channing Live	Carol Channing	

=== 10 Original Cast Series ===
Catalog	Album	Artist	Notes
11	Billy Noname	Original Cast	

=== 100 Echoes Series ===
Reissue series from used by the label during 1973. Not all these albums have "Echoes of An Era" somewhere in the title - some do, some don't. They are two-album sets.

Catalog	Album	Artist	Notes
101	Echoes of an Era: The Maynard Ferguson Years	Maynard Ferguson	
102	Echoes of an Era: The Count Basie Years	Count Basie	
103	Echoes of an Era: The Stan Getz Years	Stan Getz	
104	Echoes of an Era: The Dinah Washington Years	Dinah Washington	
105	Echoes of an Era: The Sarah Vaughan Years	Sarah Vaughan	
106	Diz 'n' Bird: The Beginning	Dizzy Gillespie and Charlie Parker	
107	Echoes of an Era: Count Basie with Tony Bennett and Sarah Vaughan	Count Basie, Tony Bennett and Sarah Vaughan	
108	Echoes of an Era: Music to Keep Your Husband Happy	Sonny Lester	
109	Echoes of an Era: The Louis Armstrong Years	Duke Ellington and Louis Armstrong	
110	Echoes of an Era: The Maynard Ferguson and Herbie Mann Years	Maynard Ferguson and Herbie Mann	
111	Echoes of an Era	Jack Tatum, Erroll Garner, Bud Powell & B. Taylor	
112	Echoes of a Rock Era: The Early Years	Various Artists	
113	Echoes of a Rock Era: The Middle Years	Various Artists	
114	Echoes of a Rock Era: The Later Years	Various Artists	
115	Echoes of a Rock Era	Various Artists	
116	Echoes of an Era: Message From Newport/Newport Suite	Maynard Ferguson	
117	Echoes of an Era: Queen of the Blues	Dinah Washington	
118	Echoes of an Era: The Best of Count Basie	Count Basie	
119	Echoes of an Era: The Best of Stan Getz	Stan Getz	
120	Echoes of an Era: The Best of Charlie Parker	Charlie Parker	
121	Echoes of an Era	Johnny Dankworth and Billy Strayhorn	
122	Echoes of an Era: Maynard Ferguson '61/Si! Si! M.F.	Maynard Ferguson	
123	Echoes of an Era	Stan Getz and Sonny Stitt	
124	Echoes of an Era: Kansas City Suite/Easin' It	Count Basie	
125	Echoes of an Era: The Immortal Dinah Washington	Dinah Washington	
126	Echoes of an Era	Count Basie, Stan Getz and Sarah Vaughan	
127	Echoes of an Era: Birdland Live at Carnegie Hall	Various Artists	
128	Echoes of an Era	Joe Newman, Zoot Sims, John Coltrane and Ray Draper	
129	Echoes of an Era	Jackie McLean Quintet and Sextet	
130	Echoes of an Era: Bantu Afrika	Randy Weston	
131	Echoes of an Era	Art Blakey and his Jazz Messengers	
132	Echoes of an Era: Vernacular	John Handy	

=== 59000 Original Rock N' Roll Hits Series ===
This was the label's final effort at repackaging its old recordings.

Catalog	Album	Artist	Notes
59001	Original Rock 'N Roll Hits of the 50s, Volume 1	Various Artists	
59002	Original Rock 'N Roll Hits of the 50s, Volume 2	Various Artists	
59003	Original Rock 'N Roll Hits of the 50s, Volume 3	Various Artists	
59004	Original Rock 'N Roll Hits of the 50s, Volume 4	Various Artists	
59005	Original Rock 'N Roll Hits of the 50s, Volume 5	Various Artists	
59006	Original Rock 'N Roll Hits of the 50s, Volume 6	Various Artists	
59007	Original Rock 'N Roll Hits of the 50s, Volume 7	Various Artists	
59008	Original Rock 'N Roll Hits of the 50s, Volume 8	Various Artists	
59009	Original Rock 'N Roll Hits of the 50s, Volume 9	Various Artists	
59010	Original Rock 'N Roll Hits of the 60s, Volume 10	Various Artists	
59011	Original Rock 'N Roll Hits of the 60s, Volume 11	Various Artists	
59012	Original Rock 'N Roll Hits of the 60s, Volume 12	Various Artists	
59013	Original Rock 'N Roll Hits of the 60s, Volume 13	Various Artists	
59014	Original Rock 'N Roll Hits of the 60s, Volume 14	Various Artists	
59015	Original Rock 'N Roll Hits of the 60s, Volume 15	Various Artists	
59016	Original Rock 'N Roll Hits of the 60s, Volume 16	Various Artists	

=== 9000 African Series ===
These albums, which were acquired by Roulette for U.S. distribution, were recorded in the continent of Africa.

Catalog	Album	Artist	Notes
9001	Songs of New Nations	The De Paur Chorus	
9002	Life in the Bush	Various Artists	
9003	Music of West Africa	Various Artists	
9004	Dahomey Guinee	Various Artists	

=== 65000 International Series ===
Catalog	Album	Artist	Notes
9001	Uhuru Afrika	Randy Weston	
65002	Around the World in Percussion	Louis Bellson	

=== 75000 Classical Series ===
Catalog	Album	Artist	Notes
75001	J.S. Bach: Brandenburg Concertos No. 1 & 2	Harry Newstone and the Hamburger Kammerorchester	
75002	J.S. Bach: Brandenburg Concertos No. 3 & 4	Harry Newstone and the Hamburger Kammerorchester	
75003	J.S. Bach: Brandenburg Concertos No. 5 & 6	Harry Newstone and the Hamburger Kammerorchester	

=== 100 Demo Series ===
Catalog	Album	Artist	Notes
100	Roulette Presents a Demonstration of the New Dimensional Sound of Dynamic Stereo	Various Artists	

== See also ==
- Lists of record labels
