= Bill Berry (trumpeter) =

American jazz trumpeter (1930–2002)

- Born: William Richard Berry; September 14, 1930; Benton Harbor, Michigan, U.S.
- Died: November 13, 2002 (aged 72) Los Angeles, California, U.S.
- Genres: Jazz
- Instruments: Trumpet

William Richard Berry (September 14, 1930 – November 13, 2002) was an American jazz trumpeter, best known for playing with the Duke Ellington Orchestra in the early-1960s, and for leading his own big band.

== Early life and education ==
Born in Benton Harbor, Michigan, Berry was the son of a bass player in a touring dance band. He spent his early years traveling with his parents. From the age of five, he took piano lessons at his parents' home in South Bend, Indiana. In high school in Cincinnati, he switched to trumpet, which he played in a Midwest band led by Don Strickland. Berry studied at the Cincinnati College of Music and Berklee College of Music in Boston, and played trumpet with the Woody Herman and Maynard Ferguson orchestra.

== Career ==
Berry served four years in the United States Air Force. In 1961, he became one of the Duke Ellington orchestra's first white members.

After his working with Ellington, he played with The Thad Jones/Mel Lewis Orchestra and led his own big band in New York. In 1965, he joined The Merv Griffin Show, where he remained for fifteen years, moving to Los Angeles with Griffin and reforming his group as the L.A. Big Band in 1971. Jack Nimitz, a baritone saxophonist in his band, said "He knew how to get what he wanted out of the band in a very relaxed way — nice and easy, no shouting." Among the most successful of his own recordings was Shortcake (Concord, 1978), an album of jazz for small group in the Ellington style; he appeared on many albums by other musicians, including Rosemary Clooney (Everything's Coming Up Rosie), Scott Hamilton (Scott Hamilton Is a Good Wind Who Is Blowing Us No Ill), Jake Hanna (Live at Concord), and Coleman Hawkins (Wrapped Tight).

== Discography ==
=== As leader ===
- Jazz and Swinging Percussion (Directional Sound, 1963)
- Hot & Happy (Beez, 1974)
- Hello Rev (Concord Jazz, 1976)
- For Duke (M&K, 1978)
- Shortcake (Concord Jazz, 1978)

=== As sideman ===
With Frank Capp

- Juggernaut (Concord Jazz, 1977)
- Live at the Century Plaza (Concord Jazz, 1978)
- Juggernaut Strikes Again! (Concord Jazz, 1982)
- Live at the Alley Cat (Concord Jazz, 1987)
- In a Hefti Bag (Concord Jazz, 1995)
- Play It Again Sam (Concord Jazz, 1997)

With Duke Ellington

- Midnight in Paris (CBS, 1962)
- My People (Contact, 1964)
- Ellingtonia Reevaluations (Impulse!/ABC 1973)
- Recollections of the Big Band Era (Atlantic, 1982)
- Serenade to Sweden (Black Lion, 1982)
- Jungle Triangle (Black Lion, 1983)
- Featuring Paul Gonsalves (Fantasy, 1984)

With Maynard Ferguson

- Maynard '61 (Roulette, 1961)
- Two's Company (Roulette, 1961)
- "Straightaway" Jazz Themes (Roulette, 1961)

With Thad Jones/Mel Lewis

- Presenting Thad Jones/Mel Lewis & the Jazz Orchestra (Solid State, 1966)
- Live at the Village Vanguard (Solid State, 1967)
- Thad Jones/Mel Lewis (Blue Note, 1975)
- Opening Night (BMG, 1997)
- Village Vanguard Live Sessions (LaserLight, 1997)
- The Second Race (LaserLight, 1999)
- All My Yesterdays (Resonance, 2016)

With others

- Ruth Brown, Fine and Mellow (Fantasy, 1992)
- Ruth Brown, Fine Brown Frame (Capitol, 1993)
- Benny Carter, A Man Called Adam (Retrograde, 2007)
- Ray Charles, Porgy & Bess (RCA/BMG 1989)
- Rosemary Clooney, Everything's Coming Up Rosie (Concord Jazz, 1977)
- Chris Connor, Double Exposure (Atlantic, 1961)
- Randy Crawford, Everything Must Change (Warner Bros., 1976)
- Bing Crosby, A Tribute to Duke (Concord Jazz, 1977)
- Dave Frishberg, Oklahoma Toad (CTI, 1970)
- Scott Hamilton, Scott Hamilton Is a Good Wind Who Is Blowing Us No Ill (Concord Jazz, 1977)
- Jake Hanna, Live at Concord (Concord Jazz, 1975)
- Jake Hanna, Jake Hanna's Kansas City Express (Concord Jazz, 1976)
- Coleman Hawkins, Wrapped Tight (Impulse!, 1965)
- Woody Herman, Woody Herman and His Orchestra '58 Featuring the Preacher (Columbia, 1958)
- Earl Hines, Once Upon a Time (Impulse!, 1966)
- Johnny Hodges, Johnny Hodges with Billy Strayhorn and the Orchestra (Verve, 1962)
- Johnny Hodges, Don't Sleep in the Subway (Verve, 1967)
- Milt Jackson, For Someone I Love (Riverside, 1963)
- Milt Jackson, Big Band Bags (Milestone, 1973)
- Irene Kral & Herb Pomeroy, The Band and I (United Artists, 1959)
- Trini Lopez, Live at Basin St. East (Reprise, 1964)
- Johnny Mathis, In a Sentimental Mood (Columbia, 1990)
- Gary McFarland, Profiles (Impulse!, 1966)
- Dave Pell, The Dave Pell Octet Plays Again (Fresh Sound, 1984)
- Herb Pomeroy, Band in Boston (United Artists, 1959)
- Jimmy Rowles, Plus2, Plus3, Plus4 (JVC, 1995)
- Jack Sheldon, Singular (Beez, 1980)
- Patty Weaver, Feelings (RE/SE, 1976)
- Joe Williams, Presenting Joe Williams and Thad Jones/Mel Lewis (Solid State, 1966)
- Joe Williams and Thad Jones/Mel Lewis, Joe Williams (LRC, 1990)
