= Don Sebesky =

American composer, arranger, and conductor (1937–2023)

- Born: Donald John Sebesky; December 10, 1937; Perth Amboy, New Jersey, U.S.
- Died: April 29, 2023 (aged 85) Maplewood, New Jersey, U.S.
- Genres: Jazz; big band
- Occupations: Musician; arranger; composer; conductor
- Instruments: Trombone; keyboards; electric piano; organ; accordion; clavinet
- Years active: 1956–2023

Donald John Sebesky (December 10, 1937 – April 29, 2023) was an American composer, arranger, conductor, and jazz trombonist. He was a multi-instrumentalist and could play a number of other instruments: keyboards, electric piano, organ, accordion, and clavinet.

== Biography ==
Sebesky trained in trombone at the Manhattan School of Music; in his early career, he played with Kai Winding, Claude Thornhill, Tommy Dorsey, Warren Covington, Maynard Ferguson and Stan Kenton. In 1960 he began devoting himself primarily to arranging and conducting; one of his best-known arrangements was for Wes Montgomery's 1965 album Bumpin'. Other credits include George Benson's The Shape of Things to Come, Paul Desmond's From the Hot Afternoon and Freddie Hubbard's First Light. His song "Memphis Two-Step" was the title track of the Herbie Mann 1971 album of the same name. His 1973 release, Giant Box, hit #16 on the U.S. Billboard Jazz Albums chart.

Sebesky worked with such orchestras as the London Symphony, the Chicago Symphony, the Boston Pops, The New York Philharmonic, the Royal Philharmonic of London, and the Toronto Symphony.

Sebesky was nominated for thirty-one Grammy Awards and won three Grammys in the 1990s: Best Instrumental Arrangement for "Waltz for Debby" (1998) and for "Chelsea Bridge" (1999), and Best Instrumental Composition for "Joyful Noise Suite" (1999). Twice, he won the Drama Desk Award for Outstanding Orchestrations, for Parade (1999), and Kiss Me, Kate (2000). Sebesky won a Tony Award for Best Orchestrations for the revival of Kiss Me, Kate (2000).

In 1975, Sebesky wrote The Contemporary Arranger, which was published with three accompanying LP phonograph records.

His Broadway theater credits included Porgy and Bess (London production by Trevor Nunn), Sinatra at the Palladium, Sweet Charity, Kiss Me, Kate, Bells Are Ringing, Flower Drum Song, Parade, The Life, Cyrano, The Goodbye Girl, The Will Rogers Follies, Sinatra at Radio City, Pal Joey, Come Fly Away, Baby It's You!, and Honeymoon In Vegas.

Sebesky's work for television garnered three Emmy nominations, for Allegra's Window on Nickelodeon, The Edge of Night on ABC, and Guiding Light on CBS. He also composed film scores that include The People Next Door (1970), F. Scott Fitzgerald and 'The Last of the Belles' (1974), and The Rosary Murders (1987).

Sebesky arranged for hundreds of artists, including Barbra Streisand, Tony Bennett, Christina Aguilera, Britney Spears, John Pizzarelli, Michael Buble, Liza Minnelli, Seal, and Prince.

Don Sebesky married Janina Serden in 1986, and had two daughters with her; Olivia and Elizabeth. He had two sons from a previous marriage, Ken and Kevin, and two daughters, Ali and Cymbaline.

Sebesky died in Maplewood, New Jersey, on April 29, 2023, at the age of 85.

== Discography ==
=== As leader ===
- Don Sebesky and the Jazz-Rock Syndrome (Verve, 1968)
- The Distant Galaxy (Verve, 1968)
- Giant Box (CTI, 1973)
- The Rape of El Morro (CTI, 1975)
- Three Works for Jazz Soloists and Symphony Orchestra (Gryphon, 1979)[2LP]
- Sebesky Fantasy (1980)
- Moving Lines (1984)
- Full Cycle (1984)
- Symphonic Sondheim (1991)
- I Remember Bill: A Tribute to Bill Evans (1998)
- Joyful Noise: A Tribute to Duke Ellington (RCA Victor, 1999)
- Kiroron I-Kiroro Melodies (2000)

=== As sideman ===
With Stan Kenton

- Viva Kenton! (Capitol, 1959)
- Standards in Silhouette (Capitol, 1959)
- Road Show (Capitol, 1959) with June Christy and The Four Freshmen

With others

- John Pizzarelli, Our Love Is Here to Stay (RCA, 1997)

=== As arranger ===
With Chet Baker

- She Was Too Good to Me (CTI, 1974)
- You Can't Go Home Again (Horizon, 1977)
- The Best Thing for You (A&M, 1977 [1989])
- Studio Trieste (CTI, 1982) with Jim Hall and Hubert Laws

With George Benson

- Shape of Things to Come (A&M, 1969)
- White Rabbit (CTI, 1972)
- Bad Benson (CTI, 1974)
- The Other Side of Abbey Road (A&M Records, 1970)

With Kenny Burrell

- Blues – The Common Ground (Verve, 1968)
- Night Song (Verve, 1969)
- God Bless the Child (CTI, 1971)

With Hank Crawford

- Help Me Make it Through the Night (Kudu, 1972)
- We Got a Good Thing Going (Kudu, 1972)

With Paul Desmond

- Summertime (A&M/CTI, 1968)
- From the Hot Afternoon (A&M/CTI, 1969)
- Bridge Over Troubled Water (A&M/CTI, 1970)
- Skylark (CTI, 1973)
- Pure Desmond (CTI, 1975)

With Maynard Ferguson

- A Message from Newport (Roulette, 1958) – also composer and performer
- Swingin' My Way Through College (Roulette, 1959) – also performer
- Maynard Ferguson Plays Jazz for Dancing (Roulette, 1959) – also performer
- Let's Face the Music and Dance (Roulette, 1960)
- Double Exposure (Atlantic, 1961) with Chris Connor
- "Straightaway" Jazz Themes (Roulette, 1961)
- Maynard '62 (Roulette, 1962)
- Maynard '64 (Roulette 1959-62 [1963]) – also performer [1 track]
- The New Sounds of Maynard Ferguson (Cameo, 1963)
- Come Blow Your Horn (Cameo, 1963)
- The Blues Roar (Mainstream, 1965)

With Astrud Gilberto

- The Shadow of Your Smile (Verve, 1965)
- Beach Samba (Verve, 1967)
- Windy (Verve, 1968)

With Freddie Hubbard

- First Light (CTI, 1971)
- Sky Dive (CTI, 1972)

With Jackie and Roy

- Time & Love (CTI, 1972)
- A Wilder Alias (CTI, 1973)

With Hubert Laws

- Afro-Classic (CTI, 1970)
- The Rite of Spring (CTI, 1971)
- Morning Star (CTI, 1972)
- Carnegie Hall (CTI, 1973)

With Wes Montgomery

- Bumpin' (Verve/Polygram, 1965)
- California Dreaming (Verve, 1966)
- A Day in the Life (A&M, 1967)
- Down Here on the Ground (A&M, 1968)
- Road Song (A&M, 1968)

With others

- Joe Beck, Beck (Kudu, 1975)
- Willie Bobo, A New Dimension (Verve, 1968)
- Ron Carter, Pastels (Milestone, 1976)
- Dizzy Gillespie, Cornucopia (Solid State, 1969)
- Jim Hall, Commitment (A&M/Horizon, 1976)
- Milt Jackson, Sunflower (CTI, 1972)
- J. J. Johnson and Kai Winding, Israel (A&M/CTI, 1968)
- Airto Moreira, Free (CTI, 1972)
- Cal Tjader, The Prophet (Verve, 1968)
- Stanley Turrentine, If I Could (MusicMasters, 1993)
- Walter Wanderley, When It Was Done (A&M/CTI, 1968)
- Randy Weston, Blue Moses (CTI, 1972)
- Kai Winding, The In Instrumentals (Verve, 1965)

With Gino Vannelli - A Pauper In Paradise (A&M, 1977)

== See also ==
- List of music arrangers
