= Don Menza =

American jazz saxophonist

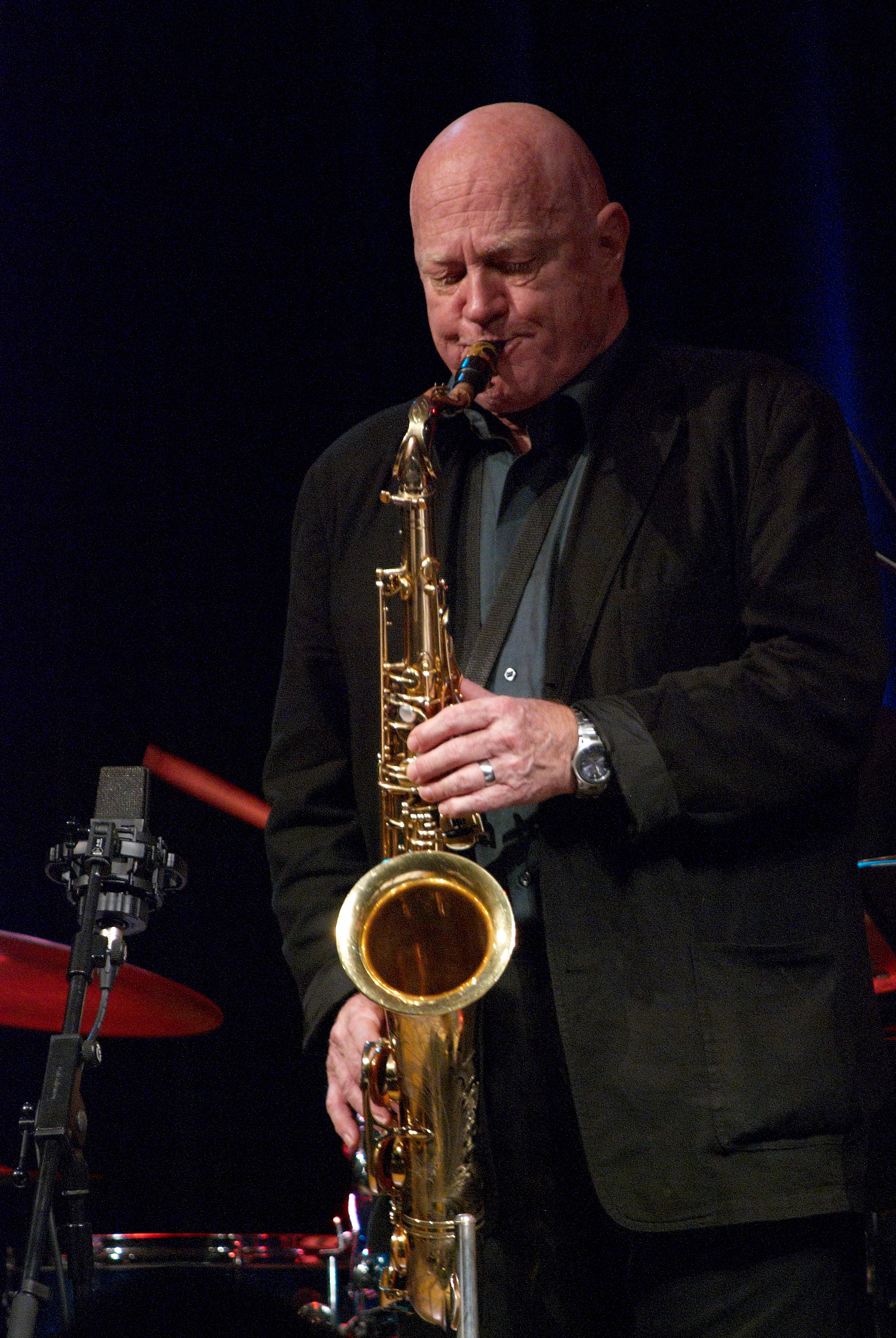
- Menza at a concert in Germany, 2010

Background information
- Born: April 22, 1936 (age 90); Buffalo, New York, U.S.
- Genres: Jazz, big band, jazz fusion
- Occupations: Musician, bandleader
- Instrument: Saxophone
- Years active: 1950s–present
- Labels: Sackville, Palo Alto
- Website: donmenza.com

Don Menza (born April 22, 1936) is an American jazz saxophonist.

== Career ==
Menza was born in Buffalo, where he attended Grover Cleveland High School. After serving in the U.S. Army, he was part of the Maynard Ferguson Orchestra from 1960 to 1962 and then briefly worked for Stan Kenton. From 1964 to 1968 he lived in Germany. Back in the U.S., he became a member of the Buddy Rich band in 1968 and recorded a well-known solo with that band on "Channel One Suite". In the 1970s he was a member of The Tonight Show Band. He later lived in California and played with Elvin Jones and Louie Bellson.

In 2005, Menza was inducted into the Buffalo Music Hall of Fame.

Menza wrote several of the charts played by the Buddy Rich Band, including "Time Check," "Groovin' Hard," and "Beulah Witch."

== Personal life ==
His son Nick Menza (1964–2016) was the drummer for the heavy metal band Megadeth.

== Discography ==
=== As leader ===
- Morning Song (SABA, 1966)
- First Flight (Catalyst, 1977)
- Horn of Plenty (Discwasher, 1979)
- Burnin (M&K, 1981)
- Hip Pocket (Palo Alto, 1982)
- Ballads with Frank Strazzeri (Fresh Sound, 1987)
- Live at Claudios with Pete Magadini (Sackville, 1991)
- Bilein with Joe Haider (JHM, 1998)
- Dream Suite (Corsaro, 2002)
- Jack Rabbitt with John Bacon, Bobby Jones (Cadence, 2004)
- Menza Lines (Jazzed Media, 2005)
- Voyage with SWR Big Band (Hanssler/SWR, 2006)
- Very Live at Groovy (Artie Music, 2008)
- Forget the Woman (Pro Jazz, 2011)

=== As sideman ===
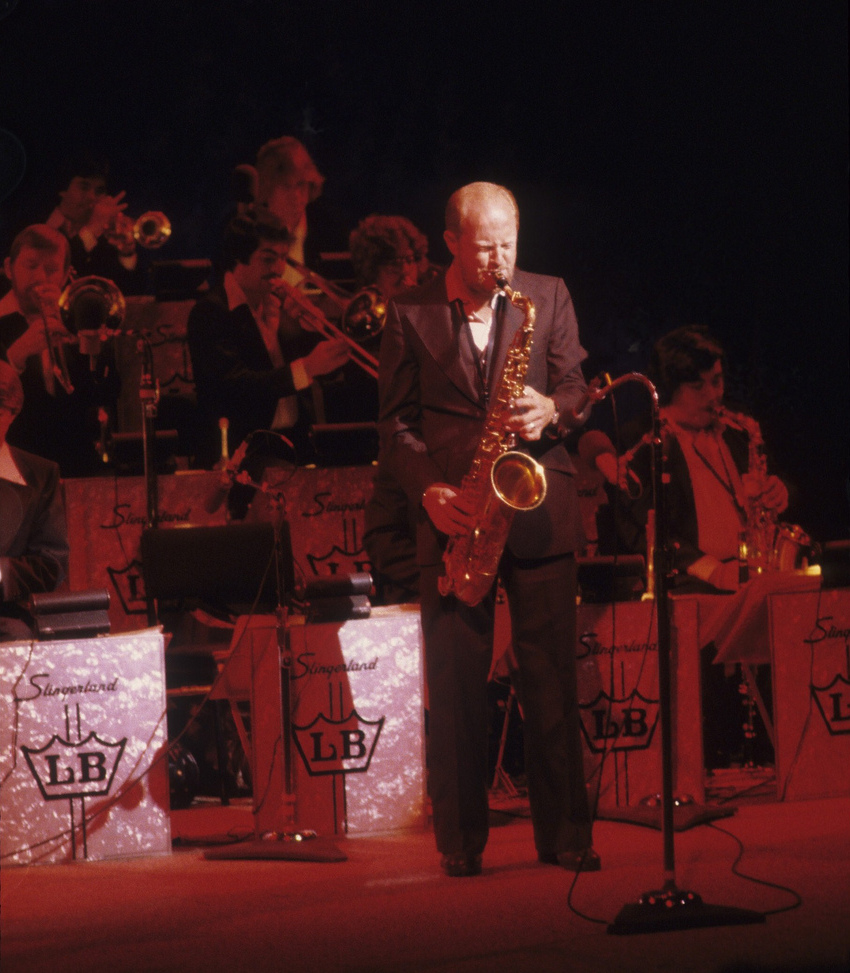
Menza performing in 1979

With Louie Bellson

- Louie Rides Again! (Percussion Power 1974)
- The Louis Bellson Explosion (Pablo, 1975)
- Sunshine Rock (Pablo, 1978)
- Note Smoking (Discwasher, 1978)
- Matterhorn (Pablo, 1979)
- Dynamite! (Concord Jazz, 1980)
- Side Track (Concord Jazz, 1981)
- Louis Bellson and Explosion (Pausa, 1984)
- Live at Joe Segal's Jazz Showcase (Concord Jazz, 1988)
- Hot (Musicmasters, 1988)
- East Side Suite (Musicmasters, 1989)
- Airmail Special (Musicmasters, 1990)
- Jazz Giants (Musicmasters, 1990)

With Les DeMerle

- Concerts by the Sea (Bar T, 1978)
- Transcendental Watusi! (United National, 1979)
- On Fire (Palo Alto, 1983)

With Neil Diamond

- Tap Root Manuscript (UNI, 1970)
- Beautiful Noise (Columbia, 1976)
- In My Lifetime (Columbia, 1996)

With Maynard Ferguson

- Straightaway Jazz Themes (Roulette, 1961)
- Si! Si! M.F. (Roulette, 1962)
- Maynard '62 (Roulette, 1962)
- A Message from Maynard (Roulette, 1963)
- The World of Maynard Ferguson (Roulette, 1964)

With others

- Cannonball Adderley, Big Man: The Legend of John Henry (Fantasy, 1975)
- Karen Alexander, Isn't It Always Love (Asylum, 1975)
- Paul Anka, The Music Man (United Artists, 1977)
- Benny Bailey, The Balkan in My Soul (SABA, 1968)
- Bill Berry, Hello Rev (Concord Jazz, 1976)
- Pat Boone, In a Metal Mood: No More Mr. Nice Guy (Hip-O 1997)
- Kenny Burrell, Heritage (AudioSource, 1980)
- Dee Dee Bridgewater, Bad for Me (Elektra, 1979)
- Glen Campbell, Rhinestone Cowboy (Capitol, 1975)
- Larry Carlton, Friends (Warner Bros., 1983)
- Pete Christlieb, For Heaven's Sake (CARS 1999)
- Eugen Cicero, Eugen Cicero Quintett (Metronome, 1968)
- Stanley Clarke, Let Me Know You (Epic 1982)
- Leonard Cohen, Death of a Ladies' Man (Columbia, 1977)
- Natalie Cole, Unforgettable with Love (Elektra, 1991)
- Michel Colombier, Wings (A&M, 1971)
- Rita Coolidge, Rita Coolidge (A&M, 1971)
- Mike Deasy, Letters to My Head (Capitol, 1973)
- Dion DiMucci, Born to Be with You (Collectables, 2010)
- Ned Doheny, Ned Doheny (Asylum, 1973)
- Ned Doheny, Hard Candy (Columbia, 1976)
- João Donato, A Bad Donato (Blue Thumb, 1970)
- Andrew Gold, What's Wrong with This Picture? (Asylum, 1976)
- Dave Grusin, Havana (GRP, 1990)
- John Lee Hooker, Born in Mississippi, Raised Up in Tennessee (ABC, 1973)
- Gloria Jones, Share My Love (Motown, 1973)
- Phil Keaggy, Love Broke Thru (New Song, 1976)
- John Klemmer, Constant Throb (Impulse!, 1972)
- Stan Kenton, Adventures in Time: A Concerto for Orchestra (Capitol, 1962)
- Claudia Lennear, Phew! (Warner Bros., 1973)
- Gloria Lynne, A Very Gentle Sound (Mercury, 1972)
- Henry Mancini, Hangin' Out (RCA Victor, 1974)
- Albert Mangelsdorff, Mainhattan Modern Lost Jazz Files (Sonorama, 2015)
- The Manhattan Transfer, Pastiche (Atlantic, 1978)
- Sergio Mendes, Homecooking (Elektra, 1976)
- Sergio Mendes, Brasil '88 (Elektra, 1978)
- Shawn Phillips, Do You Wonder (A&M, 1975)
- Walter Murphy, Discosymphony (New York, 1979)
- Walter Murphy, Rhapsody in Blue (Private Stock 1977)
- Michael Omartian, White Horse (ABC/Dunhill, 1974)
- Michael Omartian, Adam Again (Myrrh, 1977)
- Barry Mann, Barry Mann (Casablanca, 1980)
- Gayle McCormick, Flesh & Blood (Decca, 1972)
- Carmen McRae, Can't Hide Love (Blue Note, 1976)
- Barry McGuire, Seeds (Myrrh, 1973)
- Gil Melle, The Sentinel (La-La Land, 2019)
- Bette Midler, Broken Blossom (Atlantic, 1977)
- Hugo Montenegro, Others by Brothers (RCA Victor, 1975)
- Hugo Montenegro, Rocket Man (RCA 1975)
- Alphonse Mouzon, Angel Face (Tenacious, 2011)
- Maria Muldaur, Southern Winds (Warner Bros., 1978)
- Tom Pacheco, Swallowed Up in the Great American Heartland (RCA Victor, 1976)
- Dolly Parton, The Great Pretender (RCA Victor, 1984)
- Basil Poledouris, Amerika (Prometheus, 2004)
- Tito Puente, Special Delivery (Concord Jazz, 1996)
- Quicksilver Messenger Service, Comin' Thru (Capitol, 1972)
- Lou Rawls, Love All Your Blues Away (Epic, 1986)
- Helen Reddy, Music, Music (Capitol, 1976)
- Dianne Reeves, The Palo Alto Sessions 1981–1985 (Blue Note, 1996)
- Buddy Rich, Mercy, Mercy (World Pacific, 1968)
- The Righteous Brothers, The Sons of Mrs. Righteous (Haven/Capitol, 1975)
- Dick Rosmini, A Genuine Rosmini (Imperial, 1969)
- Ronnie Ross, Unforgettable Ronnie Ross (INMUS, 2000)
- Pete Rugolo, This World, Then the Fireworks (Varese Sarabande, 1997)
- Moacir Santos, Maestro (Blue Note, 1972)
- Moacir Santos, Carnival of the Spirits (Blue Note, 1975)
- Boz Scaggs, Down Two Then Left (Columbia, 1977)
- Diane Schuur, In Tribute (GRP, 1992)
- Lalo Schifrin, Gypsies (Tabu, 1978)
- Neil Sedaka, Laughter in the Rain (Polydor, 1974)
- Neil Sedaka, Sedaka's Back (Rocket, 1974)
- Seals & Crofts, Takin' It Easy (Warner Bros., 1978)
- Keely Smith, Keely Sings Sinatra (Concord Jazz, 2001)
- JD Souther, Black Rose (Asylum, 1976)
- Frank Strazzeri, Taurus (Revelation, 1973)
- Frank Strazzeri, Frames (Glendale, 1975)
- Donna Summer, Live and More (Casablanca, 1978)
- Supersax, Dynamite !! (MPS, 1979)
- Supersax, Chasin' the Bird (MPS, 1984)
- Dan Terry, Lonely Place (Happy Tiger 1969)
- Toto, Kingdom of Desire (CBS/Sony 1992)
- Narada Michael Walden, Awakening (Atlantic, 1979)
- Lenny Williams, Love Current (MCA, 1979)
- Jimmy Witherspoon, Spoonful (Blue Note, 1975)
