= Jazz at Santa Monica Civic '72 =

Box set by Various artists
- Released: August 2, 1972
- Recorded: June 2, 1972
- Venue: Santa Monica Civic Auditorium, Santa Monica, California
- Genre: Jazz
- Length: 146:56
- Label: Pablo
- Producer: Norman Granz

Various artists chronology
Reunion Blues (1972)	Jazz at Santa Monica Civic '72 (1972)	Take Love Easy (1974)

Professional ratings
Review scores
Source	Rating
Allmusic	4.5/5 stars

Jazz at Santa Monica Civic '72 is a 1972 live box set credited to American jazz singer Ella Fitzgerald and the Count Basie Orchestra recorded at the Santa Monica Civic Auditorium.

This concert recording was initially sold through mail order by the jazz producer and impresario, Norman Granz, as a three-LP set. The success of the album led to Granz founding Pablo Records, his first record label since Verve Records, which he had sold to MGM in 1960.

The concert was originally announced as featuring only the Count Basie Orchestra and Ella Fitzgerald, but Granz had invited some surprise "guests": a jazz trio led by the pianist Tommy Flanagan; the trumpeters Roy Eldridge and Harry "Sweets" Edison, the tenor saxophonists, Stan Getz and Eddie "Lockjaw" Davis, and the pianist Oscar Peterson and bassist Ray Brown.

== Track listing ==
=== Volume I ===
==== Side 1 ====
1. Count Basie & His Orchestra – "Basie Power" (Ernie Wilkins) – 3:56
2. Count Basie & His Orchestra – "Meetin'" (Oliver Nelson) – 4:47
3. Count Basie & His Orchestra – "Blues in Hoss's Flat" (Count Basie, Frank Foster) – 5:01
4. Count Basie & His Orchestra – "Good Time Blues" (Wilkins) – 7:24

==== Side 2 ====
1. Jazz at the Philharmonic All-Stars – "In a Mellow Tone" (Duke Ellington, Milt Gabler) – 14:39

=== Volume II ===
==== Side 3 ====
1. Jazz at the Philharmonic All-Stars – "Loose Walk" (Johnny Richards, Sonny Stitt) – 10:25
2. Jazz at the Philharmonic All-Stars – "Makin' Whoopee" (Walter Donaldson, Gus Kahn) – 2:35
3. Jazz at the Philharmonic All-Stars – "If I Had You" (Jimmy Campbell, Reginald Connelly, Ted Shapiro) – 3:21
4. Jazz at the Philharmonic All-Stars – "She's Funny That Way" (Neil Moret, Richard Whiting) – 3:06
5. Jazz at the Philharmonic All-Stars – "Blue and Sentimental" (Basie, Mack David, Jerry Livingston) – 1:56
6. Jazz at the Philharmonic All-Stars – "I Surrender Dear" (Harry Barris, Gordon Clifford) – 3:14

==== Side 4 ====
1. Jazz at the Philharmonic All-Stars – "5400 North" (Roy Eldridge) – 13:14
2. Oscar Peterson & Ray Brown – "You Are My Sunshine" (Jimmie Davis, Charles Mitchell) – 8:32

=== Volume III ===
==== Side 5 ====
1. Ella Fitzgerald with the Count Basie Orchestra and the Tommy Flanagan Trio – "Shiny Stockings" (Foster, Ella Fitzgerald) – 3:37
2. Ella Fitzgerald with the Count Basie Orchestra and the Tommy Flanagan Trio – "You've Got a Friend" (Carole King) – 5:06
3. Ella Fitzgerald with the Count Basie Orchestra and the Tommy Flanagan Trio – "What's Going On" (Renaldo Benson, Al Cleveland, Marvin Gaye) – 4:01
4. Ella Fitzgerald and the Tommy Flanagan Trio – "Spring Can Really Hang You Up the Most" (Fran Landesman, Tommy Wolf) – 4:11
5. Ella Fitzgerald and the Tommy Flanagan Trio – "Madalena" (Ronaldo Monteiro de Souza, Ivan Lins) – 3:40

==== Side 6 ====
1. Ella Fitzgerald with the Count Basie Orchestra and the Tommy Flanagan Trio – Cole Porter Medley: "Too Darn Hot"/"It's All Right With Me" (Porter) – 3:17
2. Ella Fitzgerald with the Count Basie Orchestra and the Tommy Flanagan Trio – "Sanford and Son Theme" ("The Streetbeater") (Fitzgerald, Quincy Jones) – 2:55
3. Ella Fitzgerald with the Count Basie Orchestra and the Tommy Flanagan Trio – "I Can't Stop Loving You" (Don Gibson) – 6:06
4. Ella Fitzgerald, Count Basie and the Jazz at the Philharmonic All-Stars – "Finale: C Jam Blues" (Barney Bigard, Ellington) – 10:38
- Times taken from the 2xCD Japanese edition

=== 1991 3xCD edition ===
==== Disc 1 ====
1. Introductions by Norman Granz – 1:00
2. "Basie Power" (Ernie Wilkins) – 3:07
3. "The Spirit Is Willing" (Sammy Nestico) – 4:37
4. "The Meetin' Time" (Oliver Nelson) – 4:50
5. "Blues in Hoss's Flat" (Count Basie, Frank Foster) – 5:08
6. "Good Time Blues" (Wilkins) – 7:34
7. "In a Mellow Tone" (Duke Ellington, Milt Gabler) – 15:00

==== Disc 2 ====
1. "Loose Walk" (Johnny Richards, Sonny Stitt) – 10:48
2. "Makin' Whoopee" (Walter Donaldson, Gus Kahn) – 2:57
3. "If I Had You" (Jimmy Campbell, Reginald Connelly, Ted Shapiro) – 3:26
4. "She's Funny That Way" (Neil Moret, Richard Whiting) – 3:05
5. "Blue and Sentimental" (Basie, Mack David, Jerry Livingston) – 1:58
6. "I Surrender Dear" (Harry Barris, Gordon Clifford) – 3:11
7. "5400 North" (Roy Eldridge) – 13:34
8. "You Are My Sunshine" (Jimmie Davis, Charles Mitchell) – 8:41

==== Disc 3 ====
1. "L.O.V.E." (Milt Gabler, Bert Kaempfert) – 3:16
2. "Begin the Beguine" (Cole Porter) – 4:27
3. "Indian Summer" (Al Dubin, Victor Herbert) – 4:34
4. "You've Got a Friend" (Carole King) – 5:12
5. "What's Going On" (Renaldo Benson, Al Cleveland, Marvin Gaye) – 4:06
6. "Night and Day" (Porter) – 5:17
7. "Spring Can Really Hang You Up the Most" (Fran Landesman, Tommy Wolf) – 4:13
8. "Little White Lies" (Walter Donaldson) – 3:24
9. "Madalena" (Ronaldo Monteiro de Souza, Ivan Lins) – 3:37
10. "Shiny Stockings" (Foster, Ella Fitzgerald) – 3:55
11. Cole Porter Medley: "Too Darn Hot"/"It's All Right With Me" (Porter) – 3:20
12. "Sanford and Son Theme" ("The Streetbeater") (Fitzgerald, Quincy Jones) – 2:58
13. "I Can't Stop Loving You" (Don Gibson) – 6:12
14. "Finale: C Jam Blues" (Barney Bigard, Ellington) – 11:05

== Personnel ==
Recorded June 2, 1972, in Santa Monica, California:

Tracks 1-2–1-6

- Count Basie & His Orchestra

Tracks 1-7–2-7

- Jazz at the Philharmonic All-Stars

Track 2–8

- Oscar Peterson
- Ray Brown

Tracks 3-1–3-5, 3-10–3-13

- Ella Fitzgerald
- Count Basie Orchestra
- The Tommy Flanagan Trio
  - Tommy Flanagan – piano
  - Frank DeLaRosa – bass
  - Ed Thigpen – drums

Tracks 3-6–3-9

- Ella Fitzgerald – vocals
- The Tommy Flanagan Trio
  - Tommy Flanagan – piano
  - Frank DeLaRosa – bass
  - Ed Thigpen – drums

Track 3–14

- Ella Fitzgerald
- Count Basie
- Jazz at the Philharmonic All-Stars
