= Grammy Award for Best Jazz Vocal Performance, Duo or Group =

Retired Grammy Award

The Grammy Award for Best Jazz Vocal Performance, Duo or Group was presented from 1982 to 1990.

Years reflect the year in which the Grammy Awards were presented, for works released in the previous year.

== Recipients ==
Year	Winner(s)	Title	Nominees	Ref.
1982	The Manhattan Transfer	"Until I Met You (Corner Pocket)"	Clare Fischer's 2 + 2 for Clare Fischer and Salsa Picante Present 2 + 2; Jackie & Roy for East of Suez; Hi-Lo's for Now; Mel Torme, Janis Ian for Silly Habits	
1983	The Manhattan Transfer	"Route 66"	Singers Unlimited for Easy to Love; Jackie & Roy for High Standards; Jon Hendricks & Company for Love; Clare Fischer & Salsa Picante with 2 + 2 for One Night In a Dream	
1984	The Manhattan Transfer	"Why Not!"	Jackie Cain, Roy Kral for A Stephen Sondheim Collection; L.A. Jazz Choir for Listen; Rare Silk for New Weave; L.A. Voices for Supersax and L.A. Voices	
1985	No Award Given			
1986	The Manhattan Transfer	Vocalese	Rare Silk for American Eyes; Barry Manilow, Sarah Vaughan for Blue; University of Northern Colorado Vocal Jazz I for Hot IV; Phil Mattson & the P.M. Singers for Night in the City; The Manhattan Transfer, Jon Hendricks for "Ray's Rockhouse (from the album Vocalese); The Manhattan Transfer, The Four Freshmen for "To You (from the album Vocalese)	
1987	Clare Fischer & His Latin Jazz Sextet	Free Fall	Arthur Prysock, Betty Joplin for Teach Me Tonight; Jackie Cain, Roy Kral for Bogie; The Four Freshmen for Fresh!; L.A. Jazz Choir for From All Sides	
1988	No Award Given			
1989	Take 6	"Spread Love"	Lena Horne, Joe Williams for I Won't Leave You Again; Jackie Cain, Roy Kral for One More Rose; Cunninghams for Strings 'n' Swing I Remember Bird; Carmen McRae, Betty Carter for The Carmen McRae-Betty Carter Duets	
1990	Dr. John, Rickie Lee Jones	"Makin' Whoopee"	James Moody, Dizzy Gillespie for Get the Booty; Joe Williams, Marlena Shaw for Is You or Is You Ain't My Baby; Take 6 for Like the Whole World's Watching; Ray Charles, Lou Rawls for Save the Bones for Henry Jones	
