= The Nervous Set =

1958 Broadway musical

- Music: Tommy Wolf
- Lyrics: Fran Landesman
- Book: Jay Landesman and Theodore J. Flicker
- Setting: Greenwich Village
- Premiere: March 10, 1959: Crystal Palace, St. Louis
- Productions: 1959 St. Louis; 1959 Broadway

The Nervous Set is a 1959 Broadway musical, written by Jay Landesman and Theodore J. Flicker, which centers on the Beat Generation. It tells the story of a wealthy publisher and his wife from a Connecticut suburb exploring the Greenwich Village of New York City as they navigate their dysfunctional marriage.

== History ==
The musical was based on Landesman's unpublished novel, inspired by Landesman's experiences as part of the Beat Generation or Cool Generation. It was further based on stories from a magazine Neurotica, founded by Landesman. It premiered on March 10, 1959, in the Crystal Palace theatre, located in the Gaslight Square, St. Louis. The cast of the original production included Don Heller, Arlene Corwin, Tom Aldredge, Del Close, Janice Meshkoff, and Barry Primus. A Broadway producer Robert Lantz, after watching the St. Louis production, brought the musical to Broadway of New York City and cast Larry Hagman, Richard Hayes, Tani Seitz, Gerald Hiken, David Sallade, and the original St. Louis cast, including Heller, Corwin, and Primus as the background chorus and understudies. The New York City production debuted on May 12, 1959, at the Henry Miller Theater and lasted 23 performances. The St. Louis production performed "fairly well", but the Broadway one "bombed miserably" per book The Beat Generation FAQ.

== Songs ==
Songs include "The Ballad of the Sad Young Men", "Man, We're Beat", “Laugh, I Thought I'd Die", and a preexisting song "Spring Can Really Hang You Up the Most". An unused song "Pitch for Pot" features the controversial line: "I've got the finest grade of pot you've ever seen / I guarantee it'll get you high."

The lyrics were written by Fran Landesman, and the music was composed by Tommy Wolf. Four instrumentalists provided the accompaniment, listed in the opening-week Playbill as " 'The Nervous Set' Jazz Quartet": Tommy Wolf, piano; Billy Schneider, drums; Chuck Wayne, guitar; Joe Benjamin, bass.

The song "The Ballad of the Sad Young Men" would be later recorded by many popular vocalists including Petula Clark, Roberta Flack, Shirley Bassey, and Rickie Lee Jones. Jazz vocalist Mark Murphy also included the song on his album Bop for Kerouac. "Ballad of the Sad Young Men" would be popular among gay bars.

== Off-Broadway cast recording ==
Originally released by Sony Music on May 18, 1959, the Off-Broadway Cast Recording is 47 minutes and 15 seconds long, and contains the following 17 songs.

=== Act 1 ===
- Overture/Man, We're Beat
- New York
- What's To Lose/Stars Have Blown My Way
- Fun Life
- How Do You Like Your Love
- Party Song
- Night People

=== Act 2 ===
- Overture Act II
- Party Song (Reprise)
- I've Got a Lot to Learn About Life
- The Ballad of the Sad Young Men
- A Country Gentleman
- Max the MIllionaire
- Travel the Road of Love
- Laugh, I Thought I'd Die
- Fun Life (Reprise)
- Fun Life

== Reception ==
The musical had mixed reception. The New York Daily News praised it as "most brilliant, sophisticated, witty, and completely novel", while the New York World-Telegram & Sun called it "weird". Billboard music critic Bob Rolontz praised three songs out of eighteen — "Ballad of the Sad Young Men", "I've Got to Learn About Life", and "Rejection"—as highlights of the musical. The New York Post found it to have "a certain juvenile brightness in its amiably frenetic activities." The Brooklyn Daily thought it "perhaps the best play to hit Broadway this year."
