= Jay Landesman =

American publisher, nightclub proprietor, and writer (1919–2011)

- Born: July 15, 1919; St. Louis, Missouri, U.S.
- Died: February 20, 2011 (aged 91); London, U.K.
- Occupations: Publisher, nightclub owner, and writer
- Spouse: Fran Landesman (m. 1950)
- Children: 2, inc. Cosmo Landesman
- Relatives: Rocco Landesman (nephew)

Irving Ned "Jay" Landesman (July 15, 1919 – February 20, 2011) was an American publisher, nightclub owner, writer, and long-time expatriate resident in London, England.

== With the Beats ==
He was born in St. Louis, Missouri, the youngest of the four children of Benjamin Landesman, an immigrant Jewish artist from Berlin, and his wife Beatrice, who dealt in antiques. Their son changed his name to Jay after reading The Great Gatsby during his teens.

While running an art gallery and salon in the Little Bohemia district of St Louis, Landesman founded the quarterly magazine Neurotica in 1948, based in New York City from 1949, which became an outlet for the Beat Generation of writers including John Clellon Holmes, Carl Solomon (as Carl Goy), Larry Rivers, Judith Malina and Allen Ginsberg. Dedicated to rather risqué material for its era, "contributors moved among the bases of art, sex, and neuroticism", the magazine closed in 1952 after the censors objected to an article on castration by Gershon Legman, who by then had taken over the magazine.

Back in St Louis, Landesman with his brother opened the Crystal Palace nightclub in 1952; the venue was previously used as a gay bar called Dante's Inferno. At Crystal Palace, Lenny Bruce, Woody Allen and Barbra Streisand made early appearances. A musical The Nervous Set, based on an unpublished novel by Landesman, with a book co-written with Theodore J. Flicker, premiered March 10, 1959, at Crystal Palace, St Louis, by now based in Gaslight Square and enjoyed a long run there, but lasted only 23 performances on Broadway. Featuring Larry Hagman in a leading role, the show in New York suffered from mixed reviews.

Despite its overall failure in a more prominent location, several of the songs written for the work by his second wife Fran Landesman and the composer Tommy Wolf – "Ballad of the Sad Young Men" and "Spring Can Really Hang You Up the Most" – have endured. Dedicated to the emergence of the Beat Generation, and sometimes described as the movement's only musical, it has an unusual form with a jazz quartet performing onstage and a downbeat ending. Landesman followed The Nervous Set by collaborating with writer Nelson Algren on a musical version, again featuring lyrics by his wife, of Algren's novel A Walk on the Wild Side which opened at Crystal Palace in 1960. A cabaret review Food for Thought, with the Landesmans working with librettist Arnold Weinstein, opened in St. Louis in 1962 and transferred to Yale.

== Life in London ==
Landesman had married Fran in 1950, and the couple moved to London with their two sons in 1964. He hung out with the homosexual Labour MP Tom Driberg and his Filipino companion; a diary entry from July 20, 1964, reads:

We pub-crawled with Tom D. Ended up in a pub that could well be called the Spare Nobody Bar. Lesbians, transvestites, young Danish sailors powdered from head to toe, whores, ageing pederasts and young couples all in good humour. Tom D said it helped him to keep in touch with his constituency.

A December article by Hunter Davies in The Sunday Times claimed: "There's a very way-out Salinger family just arrived in London called the Landesmans." Initially, the only person they knew in London was the comedian Peter Cook, but their social circle expanded in the 'Swinging London' milieu and their Islington home became the venue for hundreds of parties typical of the era. For Dearest Dracula, a musical staged at the Dublin Theatre Festival in 1965, he persuaded actor Vincent Price and choreographer Busby Berkeley to participate.

In 1967, he became artistic director of the short-lived Electric Garden, a psychedelic nightclub, but a Yoko Ono happening led to conflict with the management. Later enthusiasms included macrobiotic food and a talent agency Creative Arts Liberated which had the slogan: "We take the sting out of success and put the fun back in failure!" It only had a brief existence, but the Polytantric Press founded in 1977 was more durable.

== Lifestyle ==
Jay Landesman wrote several volumes of autobiography Rebel Without Applause (1987), Jaywalking (1993) and Tales of a Cultural Conduit (2006). The latter book included his novel version of The Nervous Set.

The Landesmans were frank about their preference for an open marriage, and went public in an interview in The Observer in 1979, while Fran Landesman appeared in a television documentary The Infernal Triangle in 1984.

Cosmo Landesman's own memoir of his family Star Struck: Fame, My Family and Me (2008) details his ambivalence about them, their self-promotion ("Hell has no hustler like Jay with a new project"), acid-trips and unconventional lifestyle. Their son would find himself sharing breakfast with his mother's new boyfriend or father's new girlfriend.

== Death ==
Jay Landesman died on February 20, 2011, while his wife died the following July 23. The couple are survived by their two sons, The Sunday Times film critic Cosmo, formerly married to the journalist Julie Burchill, and Miles Davis Landesman, named after the jazz trumpeter whom the couple had known. Landesman's papers before 1999 are housed in the Western Historical Manuscripts Collection, University of Missouri-St Louis.
