= A Wilder Alias =

Studio album by Jackie Cain and Roy Kral
- Released: 1974
- Recorded: December 1973
- Studio: Van Gelder Studio, Englewood Cliffs, NJ
- Genre: Jazz
- Length: 32:54
- Label: CTI; CTI 6040
- Producer: Creed Taylor

Jackie and Roy chronology
Time & Love (1972)	A Wilder Alias (1974)	Concerts by the Sea (1976)

A Wilder Alias is an album by American vocalists Jackie Cain and Roy Kral featuring performances recorded in 1973 and released on the CTI label.

== Reception ==
The Allmusic review states "A Wilder Alias features the brilliant vocal interplay and crisply harmonized lines the two were known for, albeit in a more modal and experimental setting befitting the aesthetic of the time period... These are ambitious, funky, and somewhat fusion-style cuts that fans of '70s jazz should certainly check out".

Professional ratings
Review scores
Source	Rating
Allmusic	3.5/5 stars

== Track listing ==
All compositions by Roy Kral except where noted

1. "A Wilder Alias" – 5:13
2. "Niki's Song" (Jackie Cain, Kral) – 6:25
3. "Waltz for Dana" – 4:22
4. "The Way We Are" – 6:12
5. "Good and Rich" (Richard Druz, Kral) – 10:42
- Recorded at Van Gelder Studio in Englewood Cliffs, New Jersey in December 1973

== Personnel ==
- Jackie Cain – vocals
- Roy Kral – vocals, electric piano, arranger
- Roy Pennington – vibraphone
- Joe Farrell – tenor saxophone, soprano saxophone
- Hubert Laws – flute
- Harvie Swartz – bass
- Steve Gadd – drums
- Don Sebesky – supervision
