= Theodore J. Flicker =

American dramatist

- Born: Theodore Jonas Flicker; June 6, 1930; Freehold Borough, New Jersey
- Died: September 12, 2014 (aged 84); Santa Fe, New Mexico
- Other names: Ted Flicker; Theodore Flicker
- Occupations: Playwright; theatrical producer; director; actor; screenwriter; author; sculptor
- Spouse: Barbara Joyce Perkins (m. September 30, 1966; his death)

Theodore Jonas Flicker (June 6, 1930 – September 12, 2014) was an American playwright, theatrical producer, television and film director, actor, television writer, screenwriter, author, and sculptor.

== Early life ==
Born in 1930 at Freehold Borough, New Jersey, Flicker attended Admiral Farragut Academy in Tom's River, New Jersey from 1947 to 1949. From 1949 to 1951, he studied at Royal Academy of Dramatic Art in London, alongside fellow drama students Joan Collins and Larry Hagman.

== Theatre career ==
In 1954, he became a member of Chicago's Compass Theater, America's first theater of improvisational comedy. Eventually, he worked as producer, director, and performer with the Compass Players in St. Louis. The company was such a success that he was able to raise money to establish the Crystal Palace Theater, then the only monthly repertory stage in the country.

In 1959, he wrote the book for and directed the Broadway musical The Nervous Set. Fran Landesman provided the lyrics, and Tommy Wolf the musical score. The show was revived in 2006. In 1960, he established The Premise, an improvisational production, on New York's Bleecker Street in a basement venue, where he initially appeared alongside Tom Aldredge, George Segal, and Joan Darling. Over the next few years, openings would be filled by performers such as James Frawley, Buck Henry, Gene Hackman, Sandy Baron, Al Mancini, Garry Goodrow, George Furth, Cynthia Harris, Peter Bonerz, Mina Kolb, Michael Howard, and Sandra Seacat (as Sandra Kaufman). The show eventually transferred to the Comedy Theatre in London's West End. A follow-up improvisational satire, The Premise in Living Color, targeted racism and featured Godfrey Cambridge, Diana Sands, and Al Freeman Jr.

== Film and television career ==
Moving into motion pictures, Flicker directed and co-wrote (with Henry) the screenplay for his first film The Troublemaker in 1964. As a filmmaker, he is probably best known for his political lampoon The President's Analyst (1967) with James Coburn, although he cites Jacob Two-Two Meets the Hooded Fang (1978) among his personal favorites.

An occasional actor, he plays the first victim in Beware! The Blob! (1972), directed by Larry Hagman. He also rides at full gallop as Buffalo Bill Cody in The Legend of the Lone Ranger (1981), the directorial debut of cinematographer William A. Fraker, who shot The President's Analyst.

Flicker co-created the television series Barney Miller (1975). He also wrote and/or directed episodes of The Dick Van Dyke Show, The Andy Griffith Show, The Man From U.N.C.L.E., Night Gallery, The Streets of San Francisco, and I Dream of Jeannie. Flicker appeared as the Devil in a 1971 episode of Night Gallery he wrote, called "Hell's Bells."

== Other ventures ==
Flicker wrote extensively on expressionism and how it applies to his own art, and is the author of the epic novel The Good American, one of the first books to be marketed exclusively on the Internet.

A documentary biopic screened in 2007 at the Santa Fe Film Festival, directed by David Ewing, Ted Flicker: A Life in Three Acts had its world premiere at Santa Fe's Film Center on October 17, 2008. Among the interviewees are George Segal and Tom Aldredge, as well as Henry and Darling.

== Personal life ==
His only marriage was to Barbara Joyce Perkins, whom he wed in a Los Angeles synagogue on September 30, 1966. The couple resided in Santa Fe, New Mexico from 1986. Their northside home abutted a 4-acre (1.6 ha) sculpture garden displaying his own works as well as those of Allan Houser, Paul Moore, Tony Price, Michael Bergt, and others.

On May 13, 1994, Flicker legally changed his name to Ted Flicker.

Flicker died in his home in Santa Fe, New Mexico on the night of September 12, 2014. He was 84.

== Filmography ==
- The Troublemaker (with Buck Henry) (1964)
- Spinout (1966)
- The President's Analyst (1967)
- Up in the Cellar (1970)
- Guess Who's Sleeping in My Bed? (1973) (TV)
- Just a Little Inconvenience (1977) (TV)
- Last of the Good Guys (1978) (TV)
- Jacob Two-Two Meets The Hooded Fang (1978)
- Where the Ladies Go (1980) (TV)
- Soggy Bottom, U.S.A. (1981)
