= Time & Love =

Studio album by Jackie & Roy
- Released: 1972
- Recorded: June 6–8 and 20, 1972
- Studio: Van Gelder Studio, Englewood Cliffs, NJ
- Genre: Jazz
- Length: 34:35
- Label: CTI; CTI 6019
- Producer: Creed Taylor

Jackie & Roy chronology
Grass (1969)	Time & Love (1972)	A Wilder Alias (1974)

Time & Love is an album by American vocalists Jackie Cain and Roy Kral featuring performances recorded in 1972 and released on the CTI label.

== Reception ==
The AllMusic review states "Although neither Jackie nor Roy do anything resembling jazz singing here, forget about categories; this is gorgeous music that cannot be shackled to a label".

Professional ratings
Review scores
Source	Rating
Allmusic	4.5/5 stars

== Track listing ==
1. "Day by Day" (Stephen Schwartz, John-Michael Tebelak) – 4:48
2. "Time & Love" (Don Sebesky, Danny Meehan) – 2:32
3. "Summer Song/Summertime" (Dave Brubeck/George Gershwin, DuBose Heyward) – 4:41
4. "Bachianas Brasileiras #5" (Heitor Villa-Lobos, Ruth V. Correa, Harvey Officer) – 4:27
5. "A Simple Song" (Leonard Bernstein, Schwartz) – 5:50
6. "Heading" (Jackie Cain, Roy Kral) – 2:53
7. "Lazy Afternoon" (John Treville Latouche, Jerome Moross) – 4:40
8. "We Could Be Flying" (Paul Williams, Michel Colombier) – 4:44
9. "Tapestry" (Carole King) – 3:10
10. "Tomorrow's Dream" (Kral) 3:38

- Recorded at Van Gelder Studio in Englewood Cliffs, New Jersey on June 6–8 and 20, 1972

== Personnel ==
- Jackie Cain, Roy Kral – vocals
- Paul Desmond – alto saxophone (track 3)
- John Frosk, Alan Rubin – trumpet, flugelhorn
- Marvin Stamm – trumpet, piccolo trumpet, flugelhorn
- Wayne Andre, Garnett Brown – trombone
- Paul Faulise – bass trombone
- James Buffington, Peter Gordon – French horn
- Hubert Laws – flute, alto flute, bass flute, piccolo
- Romeo Penque – clarinet, bass clarinet flute, alto flute, oboe
- George Marge – clarinet, bass clarinet, alto flute, English horn
- Phil Bodner – clarinet, flute, alto flute, oboe
- Bob James – electric piano
- Pat Rebillott, Jay Berliner – guitar
- Ron Carter – bass
- Billy Cobham – drums
- Phil Kraus, Airto Moreira – percussion
- Harry Cykman, Bernard Eichen, Max Ellen, Paul Gershman, Felix Giglio, Emanuel Green, Harold Kohon, Charles Libove, Harry Lookofsky, David Nadien, Raoul Poliakin, Max Pollikoff, Elliot Rosoff, Irving Spice – violin
- Alfred Brown, Emanuel Vardi – viola
- Seymour Barab, Alla Goldberg, Charles McCracken, George Ricci, Lucien Schmit, Alan Shulman, Anthony Sophos – cello
- Don Sebesky – arranger, conductor
