= A Chip off the Old Block (album) =

Studio album by Stanley Turrentine
- Released: End of August 1964
- Recorded: October 14 & 21, 1963
- Studio: Van Gelder Studio; Englewood Cliffs, New Jersey
- Genre: Jazz
- Length: 36:46
- Label: Blue Note; BLP 4150
- Producer: Alfred Lion

Stanley Turrentine chronology
Soul Shoutin' (1963)	A Chip off the Old Block (1964)	Hustlin' (1964)

A Chip off the Old Block is an album by American jazz saxophonist Stanley Turrentine recorded on October 21, 1963 and released on Blue Note in August 1964, featuring songs written or played by bandleader Count Basie.

== Background ==
=== Recording ===
The album was originally planned as a septet, but after a recording session it was decided to re-record as a slimmed-down quintet, with organist Shirley Scott, trumpeter Blue Mitchell, bassist Earl May, and drummer Al Harewood.

=== Release history ===
The CD reissue includes two early septet takes, with trombonist Tom McIntosh and saxophonist Charles Davis, and Ben Dixon replacing Harewood on drums.

== Reception ==
Professional ratings
Review scores
Source	Rating
AllMusic	3.5/5 stars
Stereo Review	(favourable)

The AllMusic review by Michael G. Nastos states, "The spare approach of Basie is hard to ignore, and though not essential in Turrentine's discography, it is an interesting item that showcases his lighter side positively."

== Track listing ==
=== Original release ===
Side 1
No.	Title	Writer(s)	Date recorded	Length
1.	"One O'Clock Jump"	Count Basie	October 21, 1963	7:51
2.	"Midnight Blue"	Neal Hefti	October 21, 1963	9:54
3.	"Blues in Hoss' Flat"	Basie, Frank Foster	October 21, 1963	6:42

Side 2
No.	Title	Writer(s)	Date recorded	Length
1.	"Spring Can Really Hang You Up the Most"	Fran Landesman, Tommy Wolf	October 21, 1963	6:17
2.	"Cherry Point"	Hefti	October 21, 1963	6:02

=== CD reissue ===
No.	Title	Writer(s)	Date recorded	Length
1.	"One O'Clock Jump"	Count Basie	October 21, 1963	7:51
2.	"Midnight Blue"	Neal Hefti	October 21, 1963	9:54
3.	"Blues in Hoss' Flat"	Basie, Frank Foster	October 21, 1963	6:42
4.	"Spring Can Really Hang You Up the Most"	Fran Landesman, Tommy Wolf	October 21, 1963	6:17
5.	"Cherry Point"	Hefti	October 21, 1963	6:02
6.	"One O'Clock Jump"	Basie	October 14, 1963	8:19
7.	"Cherry Point" (first version)	Hefti	October 14, 1963	7:08

== Personnel ==
=== Musicians ===
==== October 14, 1963 ====
- Stanley Turrentine – tenor saxophone
- Charles Davis – baritone saxophone
- Blue Mitchell – trumpet
- Tom McIntosh – trombone
- Shirley Scott – organ
- Earl May – bass
- Ben Dixon – drums

==== October 21, 1963 ====
- Stanley Turrentine – tenor saxophone
- Blue Mitchell – trumpet
- Shirley Scott – organ
- Earl May – bass
- Al Harewood – drums

=== Technical personnel ===
- Alfred Lion – producer
- Rudy Van Gelder – recording engineer
- Reid Miles – cover design
- Francis Wolff – photography
- Leonard Feather – liner notes
