= The Ballad of the Sad Young Men =

1958 song composed by Tommy Wolf with lyrics by Fran Landesman

"The Ballad of the Sad Young Men" is a popular song with music by Tommy Wolf and lyrics by Fran Landesman written for the 1959 off-Broadway musical The Nervous Set. The song depicts young men, sitting alone in bars, "drinking up the night and trying not to drown".

== History ==
In the jazz musical The Nervous Set about the Beat Generation, the song is sung by the character Jan (originally portrayed by actress Toni Seitz) who sympathizes with the Beats and their culture. Music reviewer Terrance Blacker likens the title to F. Scott Fitzgerald’s collection of short stories All the Sad Young Men.

As a jazz standard (sometimes called "Ballad of the Sad Young Men"), the song has been performed and recorded by several artists, including Anita O’Day on her 1962 album All the Sad Young Men, Roberta Flack on her 1969 album First Take, and Shirley Bassey on her 1972 album And I Love You So. Rolling Stone named the song in their list of "18 Essential Roberta Flack Songs" as a tribute to the singer on February 24, 2025.

Despite its solemn tone, the song became popular within the gay bar community. When Flack was a music teacher in Washington D.C., she performed "five nights a week, three sets per night" at a local gay friendly bar and restaurant called Mr. Henry’s on Capitol Hill: a cultural "hot spot" for jazz musicians in the D.C. area.

Atlantic Records VP Joel Dorn heard Flack perform one night and signed her based on the reaction from the audience to her performance of the song. According to author Eric Weisbard in his book Listen Again: A Momentary History of Pop Music, [even though] "the lyric never openly refers to the term 'gay', in the context of the homosexual concept, its references are unmistakable... the song's last line confirms its sympathetic tone... ‘guide them home again'."

In 1994, singer Renato Russo recorded the song in memory of the Stonewall riots in New York City for his album The Stonewall Celebration Concert.

== Notable recordings ==
- Chet Baker, Into My Life (World Pacific, 1969)
- Shirley Bassey, And I Love You So (United Artists, 1972)
- Kenny Burrell, God Bless the Child (CTI, 1971)
- Petula Clark, The Other Man's Grass Is Always Greener (Pye, 1968)
- Anita O’Day, All the Sad Young Men (Verve, 1962)
- Kurt Elling, Close Your Eyes (Blue Note, 1995)
- Gil Evans, Great Jazz Standards (World Pacific, 1959)
- Roberta Flack, First Take (Atlantic, 1969)
- Davy Graham, Folk, Blues and Beyond (Decca, 1965)
- Keith Jarrett, Tribute (ECM, 1990)
- Rickie Lee Jones, Pop Pop (Geffen, 1989)
- Wynton Marsalis, Standard Time, Vol. 5: The Midnight Blues (Columbia, 1998)
- Mark Murphy, Bop for Kerouac (Muse, 1981)
- Renee Rosnes, Life on Earth (Blue Note, 2001)
- Boz Scaggs, Speak Low (Decca, 2008)
