= Tom Aldredge =

American actor (1928–2011)

- Born: February 28, 1928; Dayton, Ohio, U.S.
- Died: July 22, 2011 (aged 83); Tampa, Florida, U.S.
- Resting place: Davids Cemetery, Kettering, Ohio
- Occupation: Actor
- Years active: 1961–2011
- Spouse: Theoni V. Aldredge (m. 1953; died 2011)

Thomas Ernest Aldredge (February 28, 1928 – July 22, 2011) was an American actor. Known for his works on stage and screen, his accolades include a Daytime Emmy Award as well nominations for five Tony Awards.

He won a Daytime Emmy Award for playing the role of Shakespeare in Henry Winkler Meets William Shakespeare (1978). His Broadway stage career spanned five decades, including five Tony Award nominations. He played both the Narrator and the Mysterious Man in the original Broadway cast of Into the Woods. He also appeared on television in programs including Ryan's Hope, Damages, and Boardwalk Empire, with a notable role as Hugh De Angelis, Tony Soprano’s father-in-law, on The Sopranos.

== Life and career ==
Aldredge was born in Dayton, Ohio, the son of Lucienne Juliet (née Marcillat) and William Joseph Aldredge, a colonel in the United States Army Air Corps. He originally planned to become a lawyer and was a Pre-Law student at the University of Dayton in the late 1940s. In 1947 he decided to pursue a career as an actor after attending a performance of the original Broadway production of A Streetcar Named Desire.

Aldredge carved out a respected career on the Broadway stage that spanned five decades, garnering five Tony Award nominations. He made his Broadway debut as Danny in the 1959 musical The Nervous Set. In 1972 he won a Drama Desk Award for his portrayal of Ozzie, the father of a blinded Vietnam veteran, in David Rabe's Sticks and Bones. He played Henry VIII's fool, Will Sommers, in Richard Rodgers' penultimate musical Rex in 1976. He originated the role of Norman Thayer Jr. in On Golden Pond in 1978, earning a Drama Desk Award nomination. His best-known role, however, was that of the Narrator/Mysterious Man in Stephen Sondheim and James Lapine's Into the Woods, a role he originated on Broadway and later repeated in the PBS American Playhouse production and the 1997 tenth anniversary concert. He also originated the role of Doctor Tambourri in another Sondheim/Lapine collaboration, Passion.

He was part of the 1997 all-star revival of Inherit the Wind produced by Tony Randall, playing Rev. Brown in an ensemble that also included George C. Scott, Charles Durning, and Anthony Heald.

In 1960 Theodore Flicker founded a professional Off-Broadway coffee house theater, The Premise at 154 Bleecker Street in Greenwich Village. He recruited Tom Aldredge along with Joan Darling, George Segal and Dolores Welber as the initial improvisational cast fielding and reacting to suggestions from their audience.

He had a 50-year-long career working as a character actor on television and film. He won a Daytime Emmy Award in 1978 for his portrayal of William Shakespeare in the episode Henry Winkler Meets William Shakespeare on the program The CBS Festival of Lively Arts for Young People. His best-known television role was that of Tony Soprano's father-in-law, Hugh De Angelis, on the HBO series The Sopranos.

=== Personal life ===
He was married to stage and screen costume designer Theoni V. Aldredge from 1953 until her death on January 21, 2011.

=== Death ===
Aldredge died July 22, 2011, under hospice in Tampa, Florida from lymphoma. He was 83 years old. Aldredge died during the filming of Boardwalk Empire episode "Two Boats and a Lifeguard", in which his character also died.

== Acting credits ==
=== Film ===
- The Mouse on the Moon (1963) – Wendover
- The Troublemaker (1964) – Jack Armstrong
- Who Killed Teddy Bear? (1965) – Adler
- The Boston Strangler (1968) – Harold Lacey (uncredited)
- The Rain People (1969) – Mr. Alfred
- The Rehearsal (1974)
- Countdown at Kusini (1976) – Ben Amed
- Full Moon High (1981) – Jailer
- Seize the Day (1986) – Rappaport
- Batteries Not Included (1987) – Sid Hogenson
- See You in the Morning (1989) – Beth's Father
- Brenda Starr (1989) – (fake) Captain Borg
- What About Bob? (1991) – Mr. Guttman
- Other People's Money (1991) – Ozzie
- The Adventures of Huck Finn (1993) – Dr. Robinson
- The Stars Fell on Henrietta (1995) – Grizzled Old Man
- Commandments (1997) – Mr. Mann
- Lawn Dogs (1997) – Trent's Father
- Rounders (1998) – Judge Marinacci
- Message in a Bottle (1999) – Hank Land
- A Stranger in the Kingdom (1999) – Elijah Kinneson
- Camouflage (2001) – Lionel Pond
- The American Astronaut (2001) – Old Man
- Intolerable Cruelty (2003) – Herb Myerson
- Cold Mountain (2003) – Blind Man
- Wrigley (2004, Short) – Tony
- Game 6 (2005) – Michael Rogan
- Twilight's Last Gleaming (2005) – Virginia's Husband
- All the King's Men (2006) – Banker
- Delirious (2006) – Carl Galantine – Les's Father
- The Assassination of Jesse James by the Coward Robert Ford (2007) – Major George Hite
- Diminished Capacity (2008) – Wendell Kendall
- My Sassy Girl (2008) – Old Man
- Taking Chance (2009) – Charlie Fitts
- A Magic Helmet (2010) – David / Wotan

=== Television ===
- The Seasons of Youth (1961) – Premise Player
- Ten Blocks on the Camino Real (1966) – Baron de Charlus
- N.Y.P.D. – Mr Mahoney (1 episode, 1969)
- The Happiness Cage (1972)
- Sticks and Bones (1973)
- Wide World Mystery – Nemith (1 episode, 1974)
- King Lear (1974) – Fool
- The Adams Chronicles (1976) – James McHenry
- The CBS Festival of Lively Arts for Young People – William Shakespeare (1 episode, 1977)
- The Storyteller (1977) – Frank Eberhardt
- Ryan's Hope – Matt Pearse (34 episodes between 1979 and 1982)
- The Man That Corrupted Hadleyburg (1980) – Edward Richards
- Nurse (1980) – Kelly O'Brien
- The Gentleman Bandit (1981) – Monsignor
- Love, Sidney (1981)
- CBS Library – Host/Washington Irving (1 episode, 1982)
- The American Snitch (1983) – Captain Crackers
- Puddn'head Wilson (1984) – Judge Driscoll
- Doubletake (1985) – Glendon Lane
- Heartbreak House (1985) – Mazzini
- A Special Friendship (1987) – Jefferson Davis
- CBS Schoolbreak Special – Joseph Hauptmann (1 episode, 1989)
- American Playhouse – Older Edward (1 episode, 1990)
- Into the Woods (1991) – Narrator / Mysterious Man
- Separate but Equal (1991)
- Lincoln and the War Within (1992) – William H. Seward
- O Pioneers! (1992) – Ivar
- Barbarians at the Gate (1993) – Charlie Hugel
- In the Best of Families: Marriage, Pride & Madness (1994)
- New York News – (1 episode, 1995)
- Andersonville (1996) – Sgt Horace Trimble
- Harvest of Fire (1996) – Jacob Hostetler
- Passion (1996) – Dr Tambourri
- Earthly Possessions – Spry Old Man (1 episode, 1999)
- Now and Again – Mr Leflin (1 episode, 1999)
- Third Watch – (1 episode, 2000)
- Law & Order – Retired Props Clerk (1 episode, 2000)
- The Sopranos – Hugh DeAngelis (23 episodes between 2000 and 2007)
- Law & Order: Criminal Intent – Attorney George Knowles (1 episode, 2001)
- Line of Fire – Senator Glenn Boulder (1 episode, 2004)
- Click and Clack's As the Wrench Turns – Professor (1 episode, 2008)
- Taking Chance (2009) – Charlie Fitts
- Damages – Uncle Pete (13 episodes between 2007 and 2012) (final appearance)
- Boardwalk Empire – Ethan Thompson (5 episodes, 2010–2011)

=== Theatre ===
- The Nervous Set (1959)
- Stock up on Pepper 'Cause Turkey's Going to War (1967)
- Sticks and Bones (1972)
- The Fool inKing Lear (1973)
- Where's Charley? (1975)
- Rex (1976)
- Vieux Carré (1977)
- On Golden Pond (1979)
- The Little Foxes (1981)
- Into the Woods (1987–89)
- Passion (1994)
- Inherit the Wind (1996)
- 1776 (1997)
- Into the Woods (1997)
- The Time of the Cuckoo (2000)
- The Adventures of Tom Sawyer (2001)
- The Crucible (2002)
- Twentieth Century (2004)
- Twelve Angry Men (2004)

=== Cast recording ===
- Original Broadway Cast Album: Into the Woods (1991) – (performer: "Prologue: Into the Woods", "Ever After", "Act II Prologue: So Happy", "No More")
