= Up in the Cellar =

1970 film by Theodore J. Flicker

- Directed by: Theodore J. Flicker
- Written by: Theodore J. Flicker
- Based on: novel The Late Boy Wonder by Angus Hall
- Produced by: Samuel Z. Arkoff; James H. Nicholson co-producer Norman T Herman
- Starring: Wes Stern; Larry Hagman; Joan Collins; Judy Pace; David Cargo; Joan Darling
- Cinematography: Earl Rath
- Edited by: Richard Halsey
- Music by: Don Randi
- Production company: American International Pictures
- Distributed by: American International Pictures
- Release date: August 12, 1970; (NYC)
- Running time: 93 minutes
- Country: United States
- Language: English

Up in the Cellar is a 1970 American comedy film directed by Theodore J. Flicker and starring Wes Stern, Larry Hagman, Joan Collins, Judy Pace, David Cargo, and Joan Darling. The plot concerns a man who decides to bed three women.

It was described by AIP as "as near a sequel to Three in the Attic as possible" and was originally known as The Late Boy Wonder.

== Plot ==
A suicidal college student is saved by a university president, against his wishes. To get even, the student decides to seduce women in the president's life, including his wife and mistress.

== Cast ==
- Wes Stern as Colin Slade
- Joan Collins as Pat Camber
- Larry Hagman as Maurice Camber
- Judy Pace as Harlene
