= Spring Can Really Hang You Up the Most =

1955 song composed by Tommy Wolf with lyrics by Fran Landesman

Song by Jerri Winters

from the album Winter's Here
- Written: 1955
- Released: November 1955
- Recorded: July 1955
- Genre: Jazz
- Length: 3:52
- Label: Fraternity
- Composer: Tommy Wolf
- Lyricist: Fran Landesman
- Producer: Harry Carlson

"Spring Can Really Hang You Up the Most" (1955) is a popular song with lyrics by Fran Landesman, set to music by Tommy Wolf. The title is a jazz rendition of the opening line of T. S. Eliot's The Waste Land, "April is the cruellest month". The song describes how somebody feels sad and depressed despite all the good things associated with spring.

== Collaboration ==
Tommy Wolf was a pianist, composer, arranger, and musical director who met Fran Landesman while she was sitting in the bar of the Crystal Palace, a night club in St. Louis that was owned by her husband Jay Landesman and his brother. Wolf was on the bandstand playing. This experience inspired her to begin writing song lyrics and in 1952 Wolf began setting her lyrics to music. More Landesman–Wolf collaborations followed, including the melodies for the songs for the 1959 Broadway musical The Nervous Set. It included this previously released song, although it is not on the original cast album.

== Notable recordings ==
- Jackie Cain and Roy Kral – Storyville Presents Jackie & Roy (1955)
- Ella Fitzgerald – Clap Hands, Here Comes Charlie! (1961)
- Mark Murphy – Rah! (1961)
- Stan Getz – Reflections (1963)
- Julie London - Sophisticated Lady (1962)
- Carmen McRae – Bittersweet (1964)
- Hampton Hawes and Martial Solal – Key for Two (1968)
- Phil Woods - Phil Woods & The Japanese Rhythm Machine (1975)
- Blossom Dearie – Winchester in Apple Blossom Time (1977)
- Betty Carter – The Audience with Betty Carter (1979)
- Ian Shaw - A Ghost in Every Bar: The Lyrics of Fran Landesman (Splash Point, 2012)
- Bette Midler - Some People's Lives (1990)
- Norah Jones - Spring Can Really Hang You Up The Most / Come Away With (2022)
- Radka Toneff - Live in Hamburg (1992, recorded in 1981)
- Zoot Sims - Zoot Sims in Paris (1962)
- Stanley Turrentine - A Chip off the Old Block (1964)
- Bill Charlap Trio - Uptown/Downtown (2017)
- Rickie Lee Jones - Pop Pop (1991)
- Irene Kral - Where Is Love? (1975)
- Cassandra Wilson - Loverly (2008)
- Kenny Barron and Mulgrew Miller - The Art of Piano Duo - Live (2019)
- June Christy - The Best of June Christy The Jazz Sessions (1996)
- Sarah Vaughan - The Roulette Years (1991)
- Norah Jones and Marian McPartland - Full Tanglewood Jazz Festival, 2003 (2003)
- Beegie Adair - By Myself - Songs of Lost Love (2020)
- Anthony Wilson - Seasons (Live at the Metropolitan Museum of Art) (2011)
- Chaka Khan - Echoes of an Era (1982)
- Kat Edmonson - Take to the Sky (2009)
- Barbra Streisand - Just for the Record (1991)
- Sinne Eeg - Remembering You (2009)
- The Pete Jolly Trio and Friends - Little Bird (1963)
- Patti Austin - The Real Me (1988)
- Bobby Timmons - Sweet and Soulful Sounds (1962)
- Spike Robinson - "Spring Can Really Hang You Up the Most" (1986)
- Houston Person and Ron Carter - Now's the Time (1990)
- Jane Monheit - Come Dream with Me (2001)
