= Buck Henry =

American actor (1930–2020)

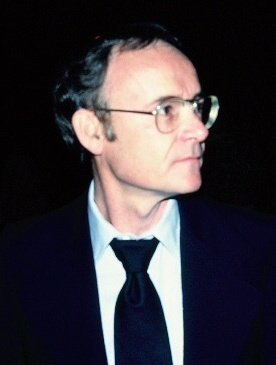
- Henry in 1978
- Born: Henry Zuckerman; December 9, 1930; New York City, U.S.
- Died: January 8, 2020 (aged 89); Los Angeles, California, U.S.
- Education: Dartmouth College
- Occupations: Actor; screenwriter; director
- Years active: 1946–2015
- Spouses: Sally Zuckerman; Irene Ramp

Buck Henry (born Henry Zuckerman; December 9, 1930 – January 8, 2020) was an American actor, screenwriter and director. Henry's contributions to film included his work as a co-writer for Mike Nichols's The Graduate (1967) for which he received a nomination for the Academy Award for Best Adapted Screenplay. He appeared in acting roles in Nichols's Catch-22 (1970) and Herbert Ross's The Owl and the Pussycat (1970), both of which he also wrote. He was a co-writer on Peter Bogdanovich's What's Up, Doc? (1972). In 1978, he co-directed Heaven Can Wait (1978) with Warren Beatty, receiving a nomination for the Academy Award for Best Director. He later appeared in Albert Brooks's Defending Your Life (1991), and the Robert Altman films The Player (1992) and Short Cuts (1993).

His long career began on television with work on shows with Steve Allen in The New Steve Allen Show (1961). He co-created Get Smart (1965–1970) with Mel Brooks for which he received the Primetime Emmy Award for Outstanding Writing for a Comedy Series. He also served as a 10-time host of Saturday Night Live (SNL) and was the inaugural member of the show's Five Timer's Club, a humorous designation used to denote people who have hosted at least five episodes of SNL. He later guest-starred in such shows as Murphy Brown, Hot in Cleveland, Will & Grace, and 30 Rock.

== Early life ==
Henry was born on December 9, 1930, in New York City, as Henry Zuckerman. His mother was Ruth Taylor (January 13, 1905 – April 12, 1984), a silent film actress, star of the original version of Gentlemen Prefer Blondes, and his father was Paul Steinberg Zuckerman (April 15, 1899 – December 3, 1965), an Air Force brigadier general and stockbroker. Though the young Zuckerman was nicknamed 'Buck' from childhood, he did not officially change his name to Buck Henry until the 1970s; both his birth name and nickname came from his grandfather.

Henry attended The Choate School, at the time an all-boys institution (now Choate Rosemary Hall). At 15 years old, he made his professional acting debut in a Broadway production of Life with Father, which later toured theaters in Brooklyn, Long Island, and the Bronx. Henry earned a bachelor's degree in English literature and a senior fellowship in writing at Dartmouth College in New Hampshire, where he wrote for the college humor magazine, the Dartmouth Jack-O-Lantern, and met movie director Bob Rafelson.

Following graduation, he enlisted in the Army during the Korean War. He served in West Germany first as a helicopter mechanic and then transferred to Special Services, where he toured with the Seventh Army Repertory Company, performing in a play he both wrote and directed.

== Career ==
=== Acting and writing ===
Henry joined the improvisational comedy group the Premise, whose ranks included George Segal and Theodore J. Flicker, performing in the West Village in Manhattan. This helped lead him into a television career.

From 1959 to 1962, as part of an elaborate hoax by comedian Alan Abel, he made public appearances as G. Clifford Prout, the quietly outraged president of the Society for Indecency to Naked Animals, who presented his point of view on talk shows. The character of Prout wished to clothe all animals in order to prevent their 'indecency', using slogans such as "A nude horse is a rude horse". Henry played the character with deadpan sincerity. He was often presented as an eccentric, but was otherwise taken seriously by the broadcasters who interviewed him. "Prout" received many letters of support from TV viewers, and even some unsolicited monetary donations, all of which were invariably returned, as neither Henry nor Abel (who had no intention of following through on the Society's stated aims) wanted to be accused of raising money fraudulently.

Henry became a cast member on The New Steve Allen Show (1961) and the US version of That Was the Week That Was (1964–1965).

He was a co-creator and writer for the secret agent comedy television series Get Smart (1965–1970), with comedian Mel Brooks. The show lasted for five seasons and 138 episodes and won numerous Emmy Awards. Two TV projects created by Henry had short runs: Captain Nice (1967) with William Daniels as a reluctant superhero, and Quark (1978), with Richard Benjamin in command of a garbage scow in outer space.

Henry shared an Oscar nomination with Calder Willingham for their screenplay for The Graduate (1967), in which he also appeared in a supporting role as a hotel desk clerk. Henry's cameo in The Player (1992) had him (playing himself) pitching a 25-years-later sequel to The Graduate, which Henry later claimed led to real-life interest in such a project from some studios.

His many other screen writing credits included the sex farce Candy (1968), the romantic comedies The Owl and the Pussycat (1970) and What's Up, Doc? (1972), the satire Catch-22 (1970), the thriller The Day of the Dolphin (1973), the comedy Protocol (1984), and the dark crime dramedy To Die For (1995). In several of these, such as Candy and Catch-22, he also appeared as an actor. In 1997, Henry was the recipient of the Austin Film Festival's Distinguished Screenwriter Award.

Overall he appeared in more than 40 films, including a lead role in Taking Off (1971) and supporting roles in The Man Who Fell to Earth (1976), Gloria (1980), Eating Raoul (1982), Aria (1987), Tune in Tomorrow (1990), Defending Your Life (1991), Short Cuts (1993), and Grumpy Old Men (1993).

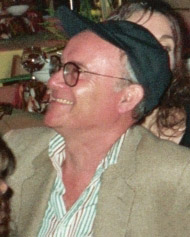
Henry in 1990

He co-directed Heaven Can Wait (1978), the remake of Here Comes Mr. Jordan, with the movie's star Warren Beatty and appeared in the film as an officious angel, reprising the character originally played by Edward Everett Horton. Henry received a second shared Oscar nomination, this time for Best Director.

Throughout his career, Henry became known for guest-starring and recurring roles on television. In 1982, he made a brief unscheduled appearance in an episode of The Price is Right where he drove a prop train on stage carrying a freezer for contestants to bid on. He also appeared in an episode of Murphy Brown ("My Dinner With Einstein", 1989) as Dr. Victor Rudman, a fractal scientist who dated Murphy. He appeared on the television show Will & Grace in 2005. In 2007, he made two guest appearances on The Daily Show as a contributor, billed as the show's "Senior Senior Correspondent". He has also appeared as Liz Lemon's father, Dick Lemon, in the 30 Rock episodes "Ludachristmas" (December 13, 2007) and "Gentleman's Intermission" (November 4, 2010). In 2011, he appeared in a multi-episode arc of Hot in Cleveland as Elka's groom.

His Broadway credits included the 2002 revival of Morning's at Seven. Off-Broadway in July 2009, he starred opposite Holland Taylor in Mother, a play by Lisa Ebersole.

=== Saturday Night Live ===
Henry hosted NBC's Saturday Night Live ten times between 1976 and 1980, making him the show's most frequent host during its initial five-year run and on November 19, 1977, Henry became the first to host five times. It became a tradition during these years for Henry to host the final show of each season, beginning with the 1976–1977 season. Henry's frequent host record was broken when Steve Martin made his 11th appearance as host of the show on the finale episode of the 1988–1989 season. During the episode of October 30, 1976, Henry was injured in the forehead by John Belushi's katana in the samurai sketch. Henry's head began to bleed and he was forced to wear a large bandage on his forehead for the rest of the show. As a gag, the members of the SNL cast each wore a bandage on their foreheads as well.

Recurring characters on SNL

- Howard, a sadistic stunt coordinator.
- Marshall DiLaMuca, father of Bill Murray's character Todd in The Nerds sketches.
- Mr. Dantley, the straight man and frequent customer of Samurai Futaba's (John Belushi) many businesses.
- Uncle Roy, a single, pedophile uncle who babysat his nieces played by Gilda Radner and Laraine Newman. The three sketches, written by Rosie Shuster and Anne Beatts, remain controversial.

Celebrity impersonations on SNL

- Charles Lindbergh
- John Dean
- Ron Nessen

== Death ==
Henry died of a heart attack at Cedars-Sinai Medical Center in Los Angeles on January 8, 2020, at age 89.

== Filmography ==
=== Film ===
Source: Turner Classic Movies

| Year | Title | Role | Notes |
|---|---|---|---|
| 1959 | The Bridge | | Voice, English version |
| 1964 | The Troublemaker | T.R. Kingston | Also writer |
| 1967 | The Graduate | Room Clerk | Also writer |
| 1968 | The Secret War of Harry Frigg | Stockade Commandant | |
| 1968 | Candy | Mental Patient | Also writer |
| 1970 | Catch-22 | Lieutenant Colonel Korn | Also writer |
| 1970 | The Owl and the Pussycat | Bookstore Man | Also writer Uncredited |
| 1971 | Taking Off | Larry Tyne | |
| 1971 | Is There Sex After Death? | Dr. Louise Manos | |
| 1973 | The Day of the Dolphin | Women's Club Man | Also writer Uncredited |
| 1976 | The Man Who Fell to Earth | Oliver Farnsworth | |
| 1977 | The Absent-Minded Waiter | Bernie Cates | Short |
| 1978 | Heaven Can Wait | The Escort | Also writer / director |
| 1979 | Old Boyfriends | Art Kopple | |
| 1980 | Gloria | Jack Dawn | |
| 1980 | First Family | Father Sandstone; TV Anchorman | Also writer / director |
| 1981 | Strong Medicine | | |
| 1982 | Eating Raoul | Mr. Leech | |
| 1987 | Aria | Preston | (segment "Rigoletto") |
| 1989 | Rude Awakening | Lloyd Stool | |
| 1990 | Tune in Tomorrow | Father Serafim | |
| 1991 | Defending Your Life | Dick Stanley | |
| 1991 | The Linguini Incident | Cecil | |
| 1991 | Shakespeare's Plan 12 from Outer Space | The Priest | |
| 1992 | The Player | Himself | |
| 1992 | The Lounge People | Lewis Louis | |
| 1993 | Short Cuts | Gordon Johnson | |
| 1993 | Even Cowgirls Get the Blues | Dr. Dreyfus | |
| 1993 | Grumpy Old Men | Snyder | |
| 1995 | To Die For | H. Finlaysson | Also writer |
| 1997 | The Real Blonde | Dr. Leuter | |
| 1998 | 1999 | Mr. Goldman | |
| 1998 | I'm Losing You | Phillip Dagrom | |
| 1998 | Curtain Call | Charles Van Allsburg | |
| 1998 | The Man Who Counted | George Postlewait | Short |
| 1999 | Breakfast of Champions | Fred T. Barry | |
| 2000 | Lisa Picard is Famous | Himself | |
| 2001 | Town & Country | Suttler | Also writer |
| 2001 | Serendipity | Himself | Uncredited |
| 2004 | The Last Shot | Lonnie Bosco | |
| 2011 | A Bird of the Air | Duncan Weber | |
| 2013 | Streetcar | Sheriff | Short |
| 2015 | Kiss Kiss Fingerbang | Cat Owner | Short |

=== Television ===
Source: IMDb

| Year | Title | Role | Notes |
|---|---|---|---|
| 1961 | The New Steve Allen Show | Regular | 5 episodes |
| 1964–1965 | That Was the Week That Was | Himself | 2 episodes |
| 1975 | The Owl and the Pussycat | Felix Sherman | TV pilot |
| 1976–1989 | Saturday Night Live | Host / Himself | 17 episodes |
| 1976 | That Was the Year That Was – 1976 | News Reporter | TV movie |
| 1978 | Quark | Dignitary | Uncredited, 1 episode |
| 1984 | The New Show | Regular | 9 episodes |
| 1985 | Alfred Hitchcock Presents | Walter Lang | 1 episode |
| 1987–1988 | Falcon Crest | Foster Glenn | 3 episodes |
| 1989 | Murphy Brown | Victor Rudman | Episode: "My Dinner With Einstein" |
| 1989 | Trying Times | Man on TV | 1 episode |
| 1992 | Keep the Change | Smitty | TV movie |
| 1992 | Tales from the Crypt | George | 1 episode |
| 1992 | Eek! The Cat | Cupid | Voice, 1 episode |
| 1992 | Mastergate | Clay Fielder | TV movie |
| 1995 | Harrison Bergeron | TV Producer | TV movie |
| 1999 | Dilbert | Dadbert | Voice, 1 episode |
| 2005 | Will & Grace | Leonard | 1 episode |
| 2007 | The Daily Show | Contributor | 2 episodes |
| 2007–2010 | 30 Rock | Dick Lemon | 2 episodes |
| 2011 | Hot in Cleveland | Fred | 3 episodes |
| 2012 | Law & Order: Special Victims Unit | Mr. Morton | 1 episode |
| 2012 | Casting By | Himself | Documentary, HBO |
| 2013 | Franklin & Bash | Judge Henry Dinsdale | 2 episodes |
| 2013 | Mel Brooks: Make A Noise | Himself | Documentary, PBS |

== Writing credits ==
=== Film ===
Source: Turner Classic Movies

- The Troublemaker (1964) (with Theodore J. Flicker)
- The Graduate (1967) (with Calder Willingham)
- Candy (1968)
- Catch-22 (1970)
- The Owl and the Pussycat (1970)
- Is There Sex After Death? (1971) (Uncredited)
- What's Up, Doc? (1972) (with Peter Bogdanovich, Robert Benton and David Newman)
- The Day of the Dolphin (1973)
- Heaven Can Wait (1978)
- First Family (1980)
- Protocol (1984)
- To Die For (1995)
- Town & Country (2001)
- The Humbling (2014) (with Michal Zebede)

=== Television ===
- That Was the Week That Was (1964) (3 episodes)
- Captain Nice (1967) (2 episodes) (creator)
- Get Smart (1965–1970) (co-creator)
- Quark (1978) (creator, 7 episodes)
- The New Show (1984) (TV) (5 episodes)
- Alfred Hitchcock Presents (1985) (1 episode "Wake Me When I'm Dead")
- Trying Times (1989) (TV) (director)
- Tales from the Crypt (1992) (1 episode)
- Great Railway Journeys (1996) (1 episode)
- Dilbert (2000) (1 episode)

== Directing credits ==
- I Miss Sonja Henie (1971) (Short film)
- Heaven Can Wait (1978) (with Warren Beatty)
- First Family (1980)
- Trying Times (1989) (TV) (director)

== Awards and nominations ==
Academy Awards

| Year | Award | Nominated work | Result |
|---|---|---|---|
| 1968 | Best Adapted Screenplay | The Graduate | Nominated |
| 1978 | Best Director | Heaven Can Wait | Nominated |

Golden Globe Awards

| Year | Award | Nominated work | Result |
|---|---|---|---|
| 1967 | Best Screenplay | The Graduate | Nominated |
| 1993 | Special Award for Ensemble (non-competitive) | Short Cuts | Recipient |

Primetime Emmy Awards

| Year | Award | Nominated work | Result |
|---|---|---|---|
| 1965 | Outstanding Achievements in Entertainment – Writers | That Was the Week That Was | Nominated |
| 1966 | Outstanding Writing for a Comedy Series | Get Smart | Nominated |
| 1967 | Outstanding Writing for a Comedy Series | Get Smart | Won |

Other awards

| Year | Award | Category | Nominated work | Result | Ref. |
|---|---|---|---|---|---|
| 1967 | New York Film Critics Circle | Best Screenplay | The Graduate | Nominated | |
| 1968 | Writers Guild of America Awards | Best Written American Comedy | The Graduate | Won | |
| 1969 | British Academy Film Awards | Best Screenplay | The Graduate | Won | |
| 1971 | Writers Guild of America Awards | Best Adapted Drama Film | Catch-22 | Nominated | |
| 1971 | Writers Guild of America Awards | Best Adapted Comedy Film | The Owl and the Pussycat | Nominated | |
| 1973 | Writers Guild of America Awards | Best Original Comedy | What's Up, Doc? | Won | |
| 1979 | Directors Guild of America Award | Outstanding Direction – Film | Heaven Can Wait | Nominated | |
| 1993 | Venice Film Festival | Special Volpi Cup for Best Ensemble | Short Cuts | Recipient | |
