= The President's Analyst =

1967 film by Ted Flicker

- Theatrical release poster
- Directed by: Theodore J. Flicker
- Written by: Theodore J. Flicker
- Produced by: Stanley Rubin
- Starring: James Coburn; Godfrey Cambridge; Severn Darden; Joan Delaney
- Cinematography: William A. Fraker
- Edited by: Stuart H. Pappé
- Music by: Lalo Schifrin
- Production company: Panpiper Productions
- Distributed by: Paramount Pictures
- Release date: December 21, 1967
- Running time: 103 minutes
- Country: United States
- Language: English
- Budget: over $2 million or $2.5 million
- Box office: $2.4 million (US/Canada rentals)

The President's Analyst is a 1967 American satirical black comedy film written and directed by Ted Flicker and starring James Coburn. The film has elements of political satire and science fiction, including themes concerning modern ethics and privacy, specifically the intrusion of the telecommunications alliance, working with the U.S. government, into citizens' private lives. The film was released theatrically on December 21, 1967, and was initially not a commercial success. However, it was reviewed favorably and eventually achieved cult status.

== Plot ==
Psychiatrist Dr. Sidney Schaefer is chosen by the U.S. government to serve as the president's top-secret personal psychoanalyst. He discovers that one of his patients was in reality, Don Masters, a Central Enquiries Agency (CEA) assassin whose assignment was to observe and vet Schaefer while undergoing his own psychoanalysis. Most approve the decision to choose Schaefer except Henry Lux, the diminutive director of the all-male Federal Bureau of Regulation (FBR). ("Lux," from "Electrolux," was a pun on J. Edgar Hoover, whose last name was a famous make of vacuum cleaner.) Schaefer is given a home in affluent Georgetown and assigned a comfortable office connected to the White House by a secret tunnel. From this location he is to be on call at all hours, to fit the president's hectic schedule.

However, the president's analyst has a unique problem: there is no one with whom he can talk about the president's top-secret and personal problems. As he steadily becomes overwhelmed by stress, Schaefer begins to feel that he is being watched everywhere until he becomes clinically paranoid; he even suspects his sweet girlfriend Nan of spying on him as an agent of the CEA. Sadly, all of Schaefer's paranoid suspicions eventually turn out to be true. Still worse, Schaefer has a habit of talking in his sleep which Lux uses to justify his security concerns.

Schaefer slips his surveillance and goes on the run with a "typical" American family from New Jersey who are on a Whitehouse tour. He then realizes this family is not “typical” when they expertly defend him against foreign agents attempting to kidnap him. He escapes again with the help of a hippie tribe/band led by the "Old Wrangler", but spies from many nations track him and attempt to kidnap then extract the secret information that the president disclosed to him. Meanwhile, Lux has agents from the FBR seek and '"liquidate" him as a national security risk. Eventually, Schaefer is kidnapped by Canadian Secret Service agents masquerading as a British pop group. Schaefer is then rescued from the Canadians and an FBR assassin by Kropotkin, a Russian KGB agent who intends to spirit him away to the Soviet Union. Kropotkin has second thoughts about his plan following a psychoanalysis session with the doctor during which Kropotkin begins to come to terms with his unrealized hatred of his KGB-chief father for having his mother shot during Joseph Stalin's Purge of 1937. Now realizing that he will still need Schaefer's help to continue his self-analysis, unlikely to happen in Russia, so he returns him to U.S. soil.

In the U.S., Kropotkin arranges a pickup with his trusted CEA colleague Don Masters, but Schaefer is kidnapped again, this time by TPC (The Phone Company), a far more insidious organization that is more feared than the CSS, the FBR, or the KGB, and has been secretly observing everybody. Schaefer is taken to TPC’s headquarters in New Jersey, and introduced to its leader, Arlington Hewes, who wants Schaefer's help in carrying out their plan for total market domination. As the TPC leader makes his presentation, a camera closeup reveals an electronic cable connected to his heel, revealing that he is actually an animatronic robot.

Hewes proudly explains that TPC has developed a "modern electronic miracle", the Cerebrum Communicator (CC), a microelectronic device that can communicate wirelessly with any other CC in the world. With the CC implanted in the brain, a user need only think of a phone number and is instantly connected, thus eliminating the need for The Phone Company's massive and expensive wired network infrastructure. For this to work, every human being will simply be assigned a number instead of a name, and will have the CC implanted prenatally. Schaefer will assist TPC’s scheme by blackmailing the president to push through the required legislation. TPC then uses a short animated sequence (a parody of the animation in Our Mr. Sun) to explain their plan to Schaefer. In response, he tells TPC they are suffering from several mental issues and in response TPC tries to brainwash him in to complying.

Masters and Kropotkin use their superspy abilities to infiltrate the impregnable TPC facility and rescue Schaefer. They hand Schaefer a M16 rifle and he gleefully uses it on The Phone Company's security staff. He then convinces Kroptkin to sabotage TPC’s whole network so throughly that everyone will forever loathe TPC and never approve their CC plan. The trio emerge victorious from the ensuing bloodbath, but months later, as Schaefer and his spy friends are enjoying a Christmas reunion, a larger group of animatronic executives from a resurrected and stronger TPC are seen staring approvingly at a secret monitor, while "Joy to the World" plays in the background.

== Cast ==
- James Coburn as Dr. Sidney Schaefer
- Godfrey Cambridge as Don Masters
- Severn Darden as V. I. Kydor Kropotkin
- Joan Delaney as Nan Butler
- Pat Harrington as Arlington Hewes
- Barry McGuire as Old Wrangler
- Jill Banner as Snow White
- Eduard Franz as Ethan Allan Cocket
- Walter Burke as Henry Lux
- Will Geer as Dr. Lee-Evan
- William Daniels as Wynn Quantrill
- Joan Darling as Jeff Quantrill
- Sheldon Collins as Bing Quantrill
- Arte Johnson as Sullivan

== Production ==
James Coburn first met Theodore Flicker on the set of Charade where the screenwriter was visiting his colleague and friend Peter Stone. Years later, Flicker met Coburn at a Christmas party, where he showed Coburn the script of a film that the screenwriter wished to direct. Coburn had just made Waterhole #3 for Paramount, and showed the script to Robert Evans, who loved it. A deal for production was made in five days. It was the first movie Evans greenlit as the new head of Paramount Studios.

The film was shot in New York City and the Paramount Studios in Los Angeles. Evans claimed that during production of the film, he was visited by FBI agents who told him that the agency did not want the film to be made because of its unflattering portrayal of the FBI. Evans refused, but when pressured by his studio, he changed the "FBI" to "FBR", and "CIA" to "CEA" by redubbing the voice track slightly out of sync. Evans believed that his telephone was monitored by the FBI (or the phone company) from that point on. The film's opening credits include a disclaimer that it was made without cooperation from the FBI or CIA.

The musical band of hippies led by McGuire was a Los Angeles rock group called Clear Light. They evolved from the band Brain Train and had recently been signed to Elektra Records when they were cast in the film, with a few band members given lines of dialogue. However, the band soon replaced its vocalist. (Cliff DeYoung joined the band as singer after the film was made and was their lead singer on their sole album; McGuire had played that part in the film.) The band released just one album and three singles before breaking up. Reportedly, the role was originally offered to the Grateful Dead, but they turned it down.

The ship used by the Canadian Secret Service was John Wayne's personal yacht, the Wild Goose.

== Critical reception ==
The film received positive reviews from critics. Roger Ebert of the Chicago Sun-Times gave it the maximum rating of four stars and called it "one of the funniest movies of the year, ranking with The Graduate and Bedazzled in the sharp edge of its satire." He added that Coburn "regains his form as a comedian" after having appeared in In Like Flint and Waterhole No. 3. It holds a 78% rating on Rotten Tomatoes based on 23 reviews with the consensus: "Its cynical satire of government bureaucracy and Cold War paranoia doesn't always land, but The President's Analyst makes a breakthrough with James Coburn's wry performance and Theodore J. Flicker's zippy direction."

Filmink called it "funny, surprising and clever" and wondered if its disappointing box office reception was due to being "too subversive. Or maybe the public didn’t like Coburn that much."

== Deleted scenes ==
Some television prints and videocassette versions of the film were missing some of the songs written and performed by Clear Light with Barry McGuire, with the songs replaced with generic stock instrumental music because of music copyright issues. The 2004 DVD release restored the songs.

A scene missing from current editions of the film involves Schaefer meeting his lover Nan seemingly by chance at a 1960s-style underground movie.

== In popular culture ==
The internet fax service The Phone Company took its name from this film.

== See also ==
- List of American films of 1967
- List of films featuring surveillance
- List of films featuring hallucinogens
