= Fran Landesman =

American lyricist and poet (1927–2011)

- Born: Frances Deitsch; October 21, 1927; New York City, New York, U.S.
- Died: July 23, 2011 (aged 83); London, U.K.
- Education: Temple University; Fashion Institute of Technology
- Occupations: Lyricist and poet
- Notable work: "Spring Can Really Hang You up the Most"
- Spouse: Jay Landesman (m. 1950; died 2011)
- Children: 2, inc. Cosmo Landesman

Fran Landesman (born Frances Deitsch; October 21, 1927 – July 23, 2011) was an American lyricist and poet. She grew up in New York City and lived for years in St. Louis, Missouri, where her husband Jay Landesman operated the Crystal Palace nightclub. One of her best-known songs is "Spring Can Really Hang You up the Most".

== Early life and education ==
She was born Frances Deitsch in New York City in 1927, Her mother was a journalist and a father was a dress manufacturer. Her brother, Sam Deitsch, founded and operated some neighborhood bars in St. Louis and, with his partner Ed Moose, later founded the Washington Square Bar and Grill in San Francisco.

Deitsch attended private schools through high school. For college, she studied at Temple University in Philadelphia and the Fashion Institute of Technology in New York City. There she initially worked in the fashion industry, as her father did.

While in New York, Deitsch met writer Jay Landesman, the publisher of the short-lived Neurotica magazine, whom she married on July 15, 1950. They had two sons, Cosmo, who became a journalist, and Miles Davis Landesman, who became a musician and performance artist. Their nephew Rocco Landesman became a producer.

== Professional career ==
=== Lyricist ===
She and her husband moved to St. Louis, Missouri, his home town. There Jay and his brother Fred Landesman started the Crystal Palace nightclub. This was a successful venture, attracting big-name acts and producing avant-garde theatre.

After listening to musicians and audiences when sitting in the bar of the Crystal Palace, Fran Landesman was inspired to write song lyrics, from 1952 onwards. One of her best-known is "Spring Can Really Hang You up the Most", her exploration of T. S. Eliot's "April is the cruelest month..." The Palace's pianist Tommy Wolf set her lyrics to music, and the song became a hit, leading to more Landesman–Wolf collaborations.

Wolf composed the melodies for the songs for The Nervous Set, a musical with a book by Jay Landesman and lyrics by Fran Landesman. It had a brief run on Broadway, and featured the songs “Spring" and "The Ballad of the Sad Young Men". Molly Darling, a musical by Jay Landesman and Martin Quigley, was produced by the St. Louis MUNY Opera.

Fran Landesman also wrote the lyrics for a proposed musical version of A Walk on the Wild Side, adapted from the 1956 novel by Nelson Algren, known for his portrayal of down-and-outers. In 1960, she began writing with singer/pianist/composer Bob Dorough, who was brought to St. Louis by Tommy Wolf to play the lead in the musical. (The book was adapted as a film of the same name, released in 1962.)

The Landesman/Dorough song "Nothing Like You" was recorded by Miles Davis and included on his 1967 album Sorcerer. Their "Small Day Tomorrow" has been recorded by many singers, and was the title of Dorough's 2007 CD, which featured 12 songs with Landesman lyrics. One of those songs, "The Winds of Heaven", was originally recorded in 1968 by Jackie and Roy, and was also covered by The 5th Dimension.

In 1964 the Landesmans left St. Louis to move to London. She wrote lyrics for a number of well-known musicians (with an emphasis on jazz) such as Pat Smythe, Georgie Fame, Tom Springfield, Richard Rodney Bennett and Dudley Moore. She continued to collaborate with composers in the USA, most notably John Simon and Roy Kral.

She also wrote the lyrics for Joyce Adcock's musical Dearest Dracula, produced in 1965 at the Dublin Theatre Festival.

Landesman met British composer Simon Wallace in 1994, and collaborated with him for the rest of her life. She and Wallace wrote some 300 songs in total. Theatre shows based on Landesman/Wallace songs include There's Something Irresistible in Down (1996), produced at the Young Vic by members of the Royal Shakespeare Company; Forbidden Games (1997) performed at the Ustinov Theatre in Bath, the Pleasance Theatre in Edinburgh, and the Gdansk Shakespeare Festival; and Queen of the Bohemian Dream (2007), produced at the Source Theatre in Washington D.C. The Decline of the Middle West (1995), performed at The Supper Club in Manhattan, also featured Landesman's lyrics.

In 1997, singer Nicki Leighton-Thomas released an album of Landesman/Wallace songs, originally titled Damned If I Do and re-released under the title Forbidden Games. From 1999 Landesman worked closely with jazz singer Sarah Moule. In 2002 Moule released a collection of Landesman/Wallace songs titled It's A Nice Thought and her three subsequent releases included 27 more Landesman/Wallace compositions. In 2010 Boston-based singer Sheplay Metcalf released a collection of Landesman/Wallace songs, Something Irresistible. In 2012, the award-winning jazz singer, composer and music director Ian Shaw released the critically acclaimed album A Ghost In Every Bar (The Lyrics of Fran Landesman) as a tribute to Landesman. Accompanied by Simon Wallace, four of these songs had never been released before. Shaw had become a close friend of Landesman after working with her son Miles and recorded single tracks with her lyrics on six albums in his back catalogue, but this album fulfilled a promise he made to her to devote an entire album to her songs.

In 1996, Fran Landesman appeared on BBC Radio 4's Desert Island Discs and requested a supply of cannabis seeds as her luxury item. The BBC received a number of complaints.

=== Poetry and performance ===
In the 1970s, Fran Landesman also began writing and publishing poetry. In the UK she became better known for this work than for her songs. She published several volumes of poetry, and performed her work at festivals and on BBC Radio.

In the last 10 years of her life, Landesman performed more frequently, often in evenings when she would recite her poetry, sing her songs, and occasionally talk about her life and work. In 2003, she appeared in New York at Joe's Pub with Jackie Cain and Bob Dorough. In October 2008, she returned to St Louis to do a one-woman show at the Gaslight Theatre.

Throughout 2010 and 2011, Landesman made bi-monthly appearances at RADA for Farrago poetry, and every six months hosted a lunchtime concert at the 606 Club in London. In May 2010, the South Bank Centre presented A Night Out with Fran Landesman at the Purcell Room, and in April 2011 the Leicester Square Theatre presented An Evening with Fran Landesman as part of the Art of Song Festival. Her last appearance was at RADA on July 21, 2011, two days before her death at the age of 83.
