= First Family (film) =

1980 film by Buck Henry

- Theatrical release poster
- Directed by: Buck Henry
- Written by: Buck Henry
- Produced by: Daniel Melnick
- Starring: Bob Newhart; Madeline Kahn; Gilda Radner; Richard Benjamin; Bob Dishy; Harvey Korman; Fred Willard; Rip Torn; Austin Pendleton
- Cinematography: Fred J. Koenekamp
- Edited by: Stu Linder; Susan Martin
- Music by: Ralph Burns
- Production company: F.F. Associates
- Distributed by: Warner Bros. Pictures
- Release date: December 25, 1980
- Running time: 100 minutes
- Country: United States
- Language: English
- Box office: $15.2 million

First Family is a 1980 American comedy film written and directed by comedian and actor Buck Henry, and starring Bob Newhart, Madeline Kahn, Gilda Radner, Harvey Korman, Rip Torn, Austin Pendleton, Fred Willard and Richard Benjamin. It received negative reviews.

== Plot ==
Manfred Link is the president of the United States. He and the usually tipsy First Lady have a 28-year-old, sex-starved daughter named Gloria. The president is surrounded by a number of eccentric staffers and allies, including Vice President Shockley, Ambassador Spender, Press Secretary Bunthorne and a presidential aide named Feebleman. He also is advised by General Dumpston, chairman of the Joint Chiefs of Staff.

The administration needs the support of the (fictional) African nation of Upper Gorm for an upcoming vote and must deal with Longo, that country's United Nations ambassador. Unfortunately, it can find only one American who can speak the Upper Gormese language, a man named Alexander Grade. As best they can understand it, the ruler of Upper Gorm wants, in exchange, a number of Americans sent to his land so that his country, like the United States, can know what it is like to have an oppressed minority. Gloria is kidnapped and Americans are transported to Africa like slaves.

== Cast ==
- Bob Newhart as President Manfred Link
- Madeline Kahn as Constance Link
- Gilda Radner as Gloria Link
- Richard Benjamin as Press Secretary Bunthorne
- Bob Dishy as Vice President Shockley
- Harvey Korman as Ambassador Spender
- Fred Willard as Chief of Staff Feebleman
- Jim Moody as Justice Haden
- Rip Torn as General Dumpston
- Austin Pendleton as Dr. Alexander Grade
- John Hancock as President Mazai Kalundra
- Julius Harris as Ambassador Longo

== Production ==
Production on First Family lasted eight months. Buck Henry said when he wrote First Family there was more of himself in it than certain other works as it wasn't an adaptation of a pre-existing work and was more based on his own observations. The film also marked Henry's solo directorial debut. First Family was a very troubled production with the shooting schedule coinciding with some of the most intense rainfall in California history with mudslides destroying some of the sets used for the film. Gilda Radner's commitment to Saturday Night Live also resulted in several scenes getting delayed. Henry stated the scheduling setbacks and lack of rehearsal time led to a stressful and draining experience while making the film but felt his familiarity with the cast from working with them on prior projects helped keep the film together.

== Reception ==
Critical reception to First Family was hostile, with many critics generally considering it unfunny. Some writers were especially unimpressed given the strong cast, all of whom were established comedians and comic actors. Buck Henry had written other successful TV shows and films such as Saturday Night Live and The Graduate, but critics felt he gave the actors largely inferior material in his directorial debut. Richard Corliss of Time magazine wrote that "Henry began with a funny situation but no plot", and that "Any episode of M*A*S*H, Taxi or The Muppet Show has more laughs and pathos per minute than this impeachable farce." People magazine wrote that the screenplay "disintegrates about halfway through the film." Vincent Canby of The New York Times offered a more positive review than other critics, praising the cast and opining that some of the sequences were funny. However, he conceded that the film's second half appeared to run out of ideas.

Despite the general critical drubbing, the film was financially successful, grossing $15 million at the box office (over $56 million in 2024 dollars). On the review aggregator website Rotten Tomatoes, 20% of 5 critics' reviews are positive.

John Hillerman was up for a role in the film and "wanted the part very badly", and had he gotten the role, he would have turned down the role of Higgins in Magnum, P.I.
