= Cosmo Landesman =

American-born journalist and editor

- Born: September 1954 (age 71)
- Occupations: Journalist; editor
- Spouse: Julie Burchill (m. 1985; div. 1992)
- Children: 1
- Parents: Jay Landesman; Fran Landesman
- Relatives: Rocco Landesman (cousin)

Cosmo Landesman (born September 1954) is a British-based American-born journalist and editor. With his then-wife Julie Burchill and friend Toby Young, he founded the magazine Modern Review, which operated from 1991 to 1995 with Young as editor.

== Early life ==
Cosmo Landesman is the older of two sons of writer and publisher Jay Landesman and lyricist and poet Fran Landesman, from St. Louis and New York, respectively. He and his younger brother Miles Davis Landesman were born in St. Louis. Their parents worked in music and theatre. The family emigrated to London in 1964. By 1967, they embraced hippie culture, wearing beads and long hair. While Cosmo studied books more deeply, Miles became footloose, leaving their secondary school. Always more bookish, Cosmo envied his younger brother's willingness to plunge into the world; he left school in London at age 16 and experimented with the fringes of performance.

In 2008, by then a journalist for several decades, Landesman's memoir Starstruck was published. The book largely concerns growing up with his theatrical parents, described by Geordie Greig as "two wacky, middle-aged American egotists who arrived in 'the land of the stiff upper lip' and caused mayhem. Blind to their own blush-making toxicity, they were obsessed with being famous." Landesman also came to terms with his parents, who viewed themselves as appropriate subjects for his book.

== Career ==
=== The Modern Review ===
With his then wife, Julie Burchill, he became friends with Toby Young, a writer and editor. The three collaborated on founding The Modern Review in 1991, in which they intended to cover low-brow culture for the high-brows.

The founders argued how to proceed when circulation fell. Landesman and Burchill separated after she had an affair with Charlotte Raven, who was then an intern at The Modern Review. Landesman quit the UK in 1995 for New York City. He was one of the contributors to Vanity Fair's Cool Britannia issue in March 1997. He was a dating columnist for The Sunday Times.

=== Article in The Spectator ===
In April 2022, an article by Landesman in The Spectator, arguing for a right to "stare at women", was criticised by British Transport Police. His article was in response to a poster campaign which warned against 'intrusive staring'. Dawn Butler MP criticised the magazine for publishing the "creepy and misogynistic" article.

== Personal life ==
As a young man, he joined the Groucho Club. He married Julie Burchill. Their son, Jack, took his own life in June 2015, aged 29, after suffering depression for many years.

In 2024, he described himself as living in "genteel poverty" after spending the money he received from an inheritance in the 2000s unwisely and ignoring his financial affairs.

== Bibliography ==
=== Books ===
- Landesman, Cosmo (2008). Starstruck: fame, failure, my family and me. London: Macmillan.

=== Articles ===
- Landesman, Cosmo (4 January 2014). "Having it both ways: it's a stupid lie to say that we're all attracted to both men and women". The Spectator. 324 (9671): 18.

=== Critical studies and reviews of Landesman's work ===
Starstruck

- Greig, Geordie (4 October 2008). "Unruly children as parents". The Spectator.
