= The Troublemaker (1964 film) =

- Directed by: Theodore J. Flicker
- Written by: Theodore J. Flicker; Buck Henry
- Story by: Buck Henry
- Produced by: Robert Gaffney
- Starring: Tom Aldredge; Joan Darling
- Cinematography: Gayne Rescher
- Edited by: John McManus; William Austin (editorial consultant)
- Music by: Cy Coleman
- Production companies: Ozymandias Productions; Seneca Productions
- Distributed by: Janus Films
- Release date: June 22, 1964
- Running time: 80 minutes
- Country: United States
- Language: English

The Troublemaker is a 1964 American comedy film directed by Theodore J. Flicker and starring Tom Aldredge and Joan Darling. It premiered at the Beekman Theater in New York City on June 22, 1964. Flicker co-wrote the script with Buck Henry; both men appear as actors in the film. The humor was based on The Premise, a Greenwich Village-based comedy troupe Flicker created that he and Henry both participated in.

== Plot ==
Jack Armstrong (Tom Aldredge) gives up his career as a chicken farmer to open a coffee shop in Greenwich Village. Lawyer T. R. Kingston (Buck Henry) assists Jack in his endeavor, which becomes paying protection money to Sal Kelley (James Frawley) and other city officials. Soon, Jack and T.R. find themselves in a bit too deep, and are being chased down by the officials. Jack’s girlfriend Denver (Joan Darling) joins the mix, and the trio gets into all sorts of chaos.

== Cast ==
Actor	Role
Tom Aldredge	Jack Armstrong
Joan Darling	Denver James
James Frawley	Sal Kelly / Sol Kelly / Judge Kelly
Theodore J. Flicker	Crime Commissioner
Buck Henry	T. R. Kingston
Godfrey Cambridge	Fire Inspector
Charles White	Building Inspector
Michael Currie	Electrical Inspector
Leo Lerman	Dirty Old Man
Al Freeman Jr.	Intern
China Lee	Hooker

== The Premise ==
The Premise was an improv group originally started by Flicker in 1960, where it performed in the Premise Theater in Greenwich Village. The original members of the group were Flicker, George Segal, James Frawley, and Joan Darling - all of which, except George, made an appearance in The Troublemaker. Buck Henry joined the group later on. He discussed his experience in an interview with Bill Dana and Jenni Matz in 2005.

“...basically it was what all improvisational groups do. There were audience suggestions, about, just about everything. We did set pieces and audience suggestion pieces and then we always did one act based on the news, so that it, it was kind of new and fresh or at least seemed new and fresh, ‘cause they were formulae to get at various kinds of spoofing the news. But, but, you know, and the audience would suggest a movie or a year or a, a nationality or an event of some kind and we’d act it out. But we were determined to do it…”

A performance put on by The Premise is where Bill Dana first met Buck Henry, and got him onto The Steve Allen Show in 1961.

== Production ==
This film was shot on location in the West Village and Times Square in New York City. It was produced under Ozymandias Productions and Seneca Productions, and distributed through Janus Films.

The crew for this film includes Ben Berk (Assistant Director), Gayne Rescher (Director of Photography), Robert Gaffney (Producer), John McManus and William Austin (Film Editors), Cy Coleman (Music Composition and Conduction), David Moon (Art Director), Leif Pedersen (Set Decoration), Robert Maybaum (Sound), and Lewis Bushnell (Production Manager).

== Critical reception ==
Bosley Crowther of The New York Times gave the film a mixed review. He applauded Flicker’s direction, but wasn’t charmed by the comedy of the film.

In a manner that bears some resemblance to intelligent reasoning some times, and at other times to the manifestation of sheer insanity, the people who made The Premise a Greenwich Village hit are trying to make a motion picture bear a reasonable resemblance to one. And the consequence of their strange endeavor is that sometimes it does, sometimes it doesn't. The Troublemaker achieves the dubious triumph of being a troublesome film.

Despite not being a fan of the storyline or the jokes, Crowther admired the professionalism of the crew, which includes Gayne Rescher’s cinematography and Cy Coleman's music for the film.

In an obituary for director Flicker, Variety called Troublemaker an “indie cult classic”.
