= Rocco Landesman =

American stage producer (born 1947)

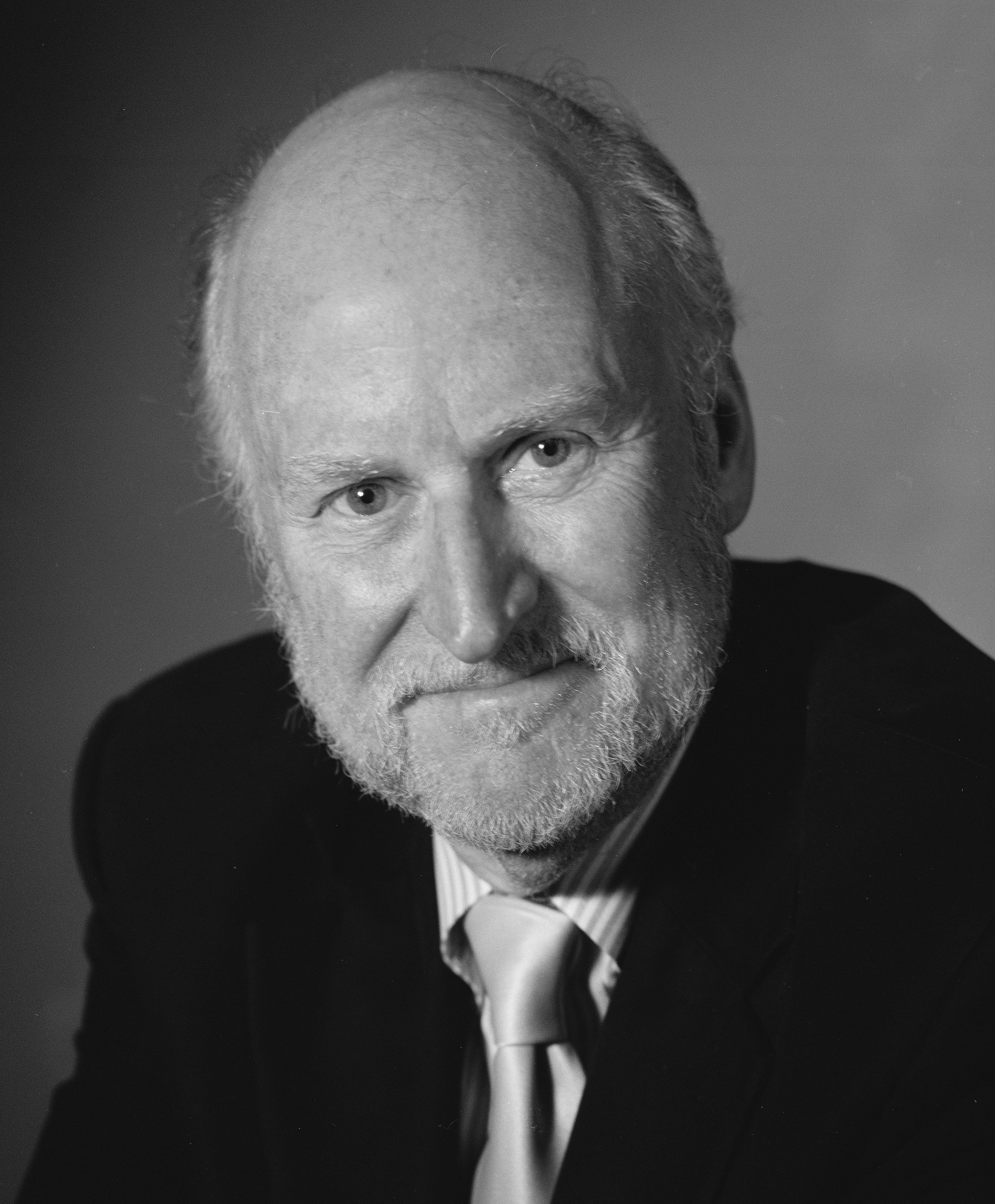

Chair of the National Endowment for the Arts
- In office August 7, 2009 – December 31, 2012
- President: Barack Obama
- Preceded by: Dana Gioia
- Succeeded by: R. Jane Chu

Personal details
- Born: July 20, 1947 (age 79) St. Louis, Missouri, U.S.
- Spouse(s): Heidi Ettinger; Debby Busch
- Children: 3
- Relatives: Jay Landesman (uncle); Cosmo Landesman (cousin); Fran Landesman (aunt)
- Education: Colby College (attended); University of Wisconsin, Madison (BA); Yale University (MFA, DFA)

Rocco Landesman (born July 20, 1947) is a long-time Broadway theatre producer. He served as chairman of the National Endowment for the Arts from August 2009 to December 2012. He is a part owner of Jujamcyn Theaters.

== Early life ==
Landesman was born and raised in St. Louis, Missouri. He is the nephew of writer, publisher and nightclub owner Jay Landesman and songwriter Fran Landesman. Rocco studied at Colby College and then the University of Wisconsin, Madison (BA English Literature 1969), and the Yale School of Drama (MFA Dramatic Literature and Criticism 1972, DFA 1976). At the Yale School of Drama, he became a protégé and friend of Robert Brustein. He also got to know novelist Jerzy Kosinski and worked with Kosinski on two of his novels, Being There and The Devil Tree. Landesman helped Kosinski, not a native speaker of English, with his English syntax and writing. While at Yale Landesman was also involved in managing a private mutual fund and a racehorse he had bought.

== Career ==
After graduating from Yale, Landesman stayed there for four years as an assistant professor.

In 1977, Landesman left to focus more time on his private investment fund, which he ran for many years. He also got involved in Broadway theater and was heavily involved in the genesis and development of Big River, a musical based on Huckleberry Finn. Landesman's involvement included persuading Roger Miller to write the music for the show. The show, which premiered on Broadway in 1985, ultimately won seven Tony Awards, including Best Musical, and ran for over 1,000 performances on Broadway over two and a half years. This success attracted the attention of James H. Binger who shared two passions with Landesman: Broadway theater and horseracing. Binger owned the Jujamcyn Theatre group of five theatres, four of which were then dark. Binger and Landesman made a deal for Landesman to become President of Jujamcyn in 1987 with the inclusion of an option for Landesman to purchase Jujamcyn upon Binger's death. After taking the helm at Jujamcyn he shifted its business model away from the historical focus of renting of theatre facilities to shows and into a more active posture as a combination of a theater owner and a developer of new plays. Other theater owners have followed this pattern. After joining Jujamcyn Landesman has produced Broadway shows, most notably Angels in America (1993 and 1994 Tony, Best Play) and The Producers (2001 Tony, Best Musical).

Landesman purchased Jujamcyn in 2005 and later sold a 50% interest to Jordan Roth.

Landesman's biggest passions are theater, baseball, horse racing and country music. His company, Jujamcyn Theaters, owns 5 Broadway theaters, and at one time or another Landesman has owned three minor league baseball teams and various racehorses. Landesman grew up a fan of the St. Louis Cardinals, and later in life he became a part-owner of the Kenosha Twins (later the Fort Wayne Wizards). He has continued his relationship with the Yale School of Drama and Yale Rep, returning to teach there over the years. Landesman has also spoken at forums and written numerous articles (mostly in the New York Times arts section), focusing mainly on the problematic relationship between the commercial and not-for-profit sectors of the American theater.

In May 2009 U.S. President Barack Obama nominated Landesman to become the next chairman of the National Endowment for the Arts. His appointment was confirmed in August 2009.

== Memberships and honors ==
Landesman has been active on numerous boards, including the Municipal Art Society, the Times Square Alliance, and The Educational Foundation of America.

In June 2013 he was inducted into the St. Louis Walk of Fame.

== Personal life ==
Landesman is married to Debby (Busch) Landesman, formerly the executive director of the Levi Strauss Foundation and currently a philanthropic advisor to corporations and foundations. Landesman was previously married to set designer Heidi (Landesman) Ettinger, and they have three sons: North, Nash and Dodge.

Political offices
| Preceded by Patrice Powell; Acting | Chairperson of the National Endowment for the Arts; 2009–2012 | Succeeded by Joan Shigekawa; Acting |
