= Neurotica (magazine) =

- Editor: Jay Landesman, Gershon Legman
- Staff writers: Richard Rubenstein, Louis Triefenbach, Gershon Legman
- Frequency: Irregular
- Circulation: 5,000
- Founder: Jay Landesman
- First issue: Spring 1948
- Final issue Number: Winter 1951; 9
- Country: United States
- Language: English

Neurotica was an American literary magazine founded by Jay Landesman. It appeared irregularly between 1948 and 1951.

== History ==
It was started by Landesman in March 1948 in St. Louis, Missouri, as a "a literary exposition, defense, and correlation of the problems and personalities that in our culture are defined as 'neurotic'. … We are interested in exploring the creativeness of this man who has been forced to live under-ground, and yet lights an utter darkness with his music, poetry, painting, and writing."

The first issue of the magazine appeared in Spring 1948. The first eight issues were edited by Landesman. When Landesman moved to New York, Gershon Legman took over as editor. The magazine ran for one final, ninth issue, Winter 1951.

The Compleat Neurotica 1948–1951 was published in 1963.

== Notable contributors and contents ==
Neurotica provided an early platform for writers of the Beat Generation including John Clellon Holmes, Allen Ginsberg and Carl Solomon.

Other notable contributors include Leonard Bernstein, Lawrence Durrell, Marshall McLuhan, Henri Michaux, Kenneth Patchen, and even a poem by F. Scott Fitzgerald.

Alongside literary work, Neurotica also published work in psychoanalysis, including pieces by Otto Fenichel, Rudolph Friedmann and Gershon Legman.
