= James Frawley =

American director and actor (1936–2019)

- James Frawley in I Spy, 1966
- Born: James Joseph Frawley; September 29, 1936; Houston, Texas, U.S.
- Died: January 22, 2019 (aged 82); Indian Wells, California, U.S.
- Occupations: Film director, actor
- Years active: 1960–2019

James Joseph Frawley (September 29, 1936 – January 22, 2019) was an American director and actor. He was a member of the Actors Studio since around 1961. He was best known for directing The Muppet Movie (1979), and The Monkees television series.

== Career ==
Born in Houston, Texas, Frawley had a short-lived acting career, appearing in supporting roles in film and television from 1963 to 1966. A memorable appearance was the role of Hawaii District Attorney Alvarez in the 1965 Perry Mason episode "The Case of the Feather Cloak." In 1966, he was hired as a director for the new series The Monkees, he ended up directing half of the series 58 episodes.

He began a career of over four decades as a director. TV series he directed included Cagney & Lacey, Magnum, P.I., Smallville, Ghost Whisperer, and Judging Amy, along with many others. He directed occasional feature films and television films, most notably The Muppet Movie in 1979, in which he also had a cameo. His last acting role was that of a bartender in TV's American Gothic in 1996.

He won the Primetime Emmy Award for Outstanding Directing for a Comedy Series in 1967 for the episode "Royal Flush" of The Monkees, and was nominated for the same award the following year for another Monkees episode, "The Devil and Peter Tork."

Frawley died from a heart attack while at home in Indian Wells, California, on January 22, 2019, at the age of 82.

== Filmography ==
=== Director ===
- The Monkees (1966–1968)
- That Girl (1967–1968)
- The Christian Licorice Store (1971)
- Kid Blue (1973)
- The Big Bus (1976)
- Columbo (1977–1978, 1989)
- The Eddie Capra Mysteries (1978–1979)
- The Muppet Movie (1979)
- The Great American Traffic Jam (1980)
- Magnum, P.I. (1982–1984)
- Faerie Tale Theatre's Hansel And Gretel 1982
- Scarecrow and Mrs. King (1983–1985)
- Cagney & Lacey (1984–1988)
- Fraternity Vacation (1985)
- Spies, Lies and Naked Thighs (1988)
- Father Dowling Mysteries (1990–1991)
- Law & Order (1992–1993)
- Picket Fences (1994–1995)
- Chicago Hope (1994–1996)
- Ally McBeal (1997) - Pilot
- On the 2nd Day of Christmas (1997)
- Sins of the Mind (1997)
- Vengeance Unlimited (1998–1999)
- The Three Stooges (2000)
- Ghost Whisperer (2005–2006)
- Smallville (2001)
- Judging Amy (1999–2005)
- Notes from the Underbelly (2007)
- Dirty Sexy Money (2007)
- Grey's Anatomy (2007–2009)
- Private Practice (2008–2009)

=== Actor ===
- Greenwich Village Story (1963) - Norman
- Ladybug Ladybug (1963) - Truck Driver
- The Troublemaker (1964) - Sal Kelly / Sol Kelly / Judge Kelly
- The Man from U.N.C.L.E. (1964-1966, 2 episodes) - Max / Lieutenant Manuera
- The Outer Limits (1964, Episode: "The Inheritors") - Pvt. Robert Renaldo
- Gunsmoke (1964, S10E7: "Help Me Kitty") - Outlaw Furnas
- The Dick Van Dyke Show (1965, Episode: Fifty-Two, Forty-Five or Work") - Joe Galardi
- McHale's Navy (1966, 2 Episodes) - The German Sergeant / The German Noncom
- The Monkees (1966-1968, 12 episodes) - Voice on telephone / Mr. Schneider / Rudy Bayshore (voice)
- Hogan's Heroes (1966, Episode: "The Great Impersonation") - Gestapo Captain
- My Favorite Martian (1966, Episode: "Doggone Martin") - Mr. Frisby
- Blue Light (1966, Episode: "Field of Dishonor") - Ehrlich
- Voyage To The Bottom Of The Sea (1966, Episode: "Killers of the Deep") - Manolo
- I Spy (1966, Episode: "It's All Done with Mirrors") - Greenburg
- Wild Wild Winter (1966) - Stone
- The Muppet Movie (1979) - Waiter
