= Jackie and Roy =

American jazz vocal duo

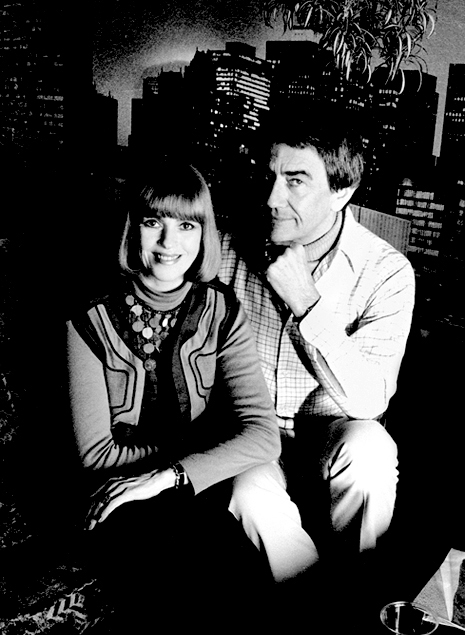
Jackie Cain and Roy Kral at Bach Dancing & Dynamite Society, Half Moon Bay, Calif., 1982.

Jackie and Roy was an American jazz vocal team consisting of husband and wife singer Jackie Cain (1928–2014) and singer/pianist Roy Kral (1921–2002). They sang together for 56 years and made almost 40 albums.

Kral's 2002 obituary in The New York Times said: "Their voices had similar ranges but were an octave apart, creating unusual harmonies."

== Career ==
They first joined forces in 1946, and in 1996 they celebrated their 50th anniversary as a vocal duo. Jackie and Roy's stint with Charlie Ventura's band in 1948 and 1949 brought them recognition; Lou Stein's "East of Suez" was an unusual feature for their voices. Shortly after leaving Ventura in June 1949, the couple married and worked together on a regular basis thereafter. Jackie and Roy had their own television show in Chicago in the early 1950s, worked in Las Vegas from 1957 to 1960, settled in New York City in 1963, and appeared on some television commercials. They recorded many performances for multiple record labels through the decades, and performed until Roy Kral died in August 2002. Fairly early in their career, Jackie and Roy were befriended by composer Alec Wilder, who wrote the liner notes for one of their earliest albums, Jackie Cain and Roy Kral (1955). They had always favored Wilder's songs and, ten years after his death, paid tribute by recording an entire album of them, An Alec Wilder Collection.

== Discography ==
- Jackie and Roy: Jazz Classics by Charlie Ventura's Band (1948; reissue on CD, 2005, of earlier 78s)
- Jackie Cain and Roy Kral (Trio, 1955, reissued by Storyville, then by Black Lion as Spring Can Really Hang You Up the Most, 1987)
- Sing Baby Sing! (Storyville, 1956)
- The Glory of Love (ABC-Paramount, 1956)
- Jackie and Roy (Brunswick, 1957)
- Bits and Pieces (ABC-Paramount, 1957)
- Free and Easy (ABC-Paramount, 1957)
- In the Spotlight (ABC-Paramount, 1958)
- Sweet and Low Down (Columbia, 1960)
- Double Take (Columbia, 1961)
- Like Sing (Columbia, 1963)
- By Jupiter & Girl Crazy (Roulette, 1964; reissued by Fresh Sound)
- Changes: Jackie & Roy (Verve, 1966)
- Lovesick (Verve, 1966)
- Grass (Capitol, 1969)
- Time & Love (CTI, 1972)
- A Wilder Alias (CTI, 1974)
- Concerts by the Sea (Studio 7, 1976)
- Echoes (1976, not issued until 2007 on Jazzed Media)
- Star Sounds (Concord, 1979)
- East of Suez (Concord, 1980)
- Sondheim (Red Baron, 1982)
- High Standards (Concord, 1982)
- We've Got It: The Music of Cy Coleman (Discovery, 1984)
- Bogie (Fantasy, 1986)
- One More Rose: A Tribute to Alan Jay Lerner (Audiophile, 1987)
- Full Circle (Contemporary, 1988; reissued by Fantasy, 1992)
- An Alec Wilder Collection (Audiophile, 1990)
- Forever (MusicMasters, 1995)
- The Beautiful Sea: Songs of Sun, Sand & Sea (DRG, 1999)
