= Dorough =

Dorough is a surname. Notable people with this surname include:

- Bo Dorough, American lawyer and politician
- Bob Dorough, American bebop and cool jazz vocalist
- Dalee Sambo Dorough, Inuit expert in international human rights law, international relations, and Alaska Native rights
- Howie Dorough, American singer, songwriter, and actor

== See also ==
- Dorough Round Barn and Farm, a farm in the U.S. state of Georgia
- Dorrough, American rapper
- Michael L. Dorrough, American inventor and audio engineer
