= Joan Darling =

American actress

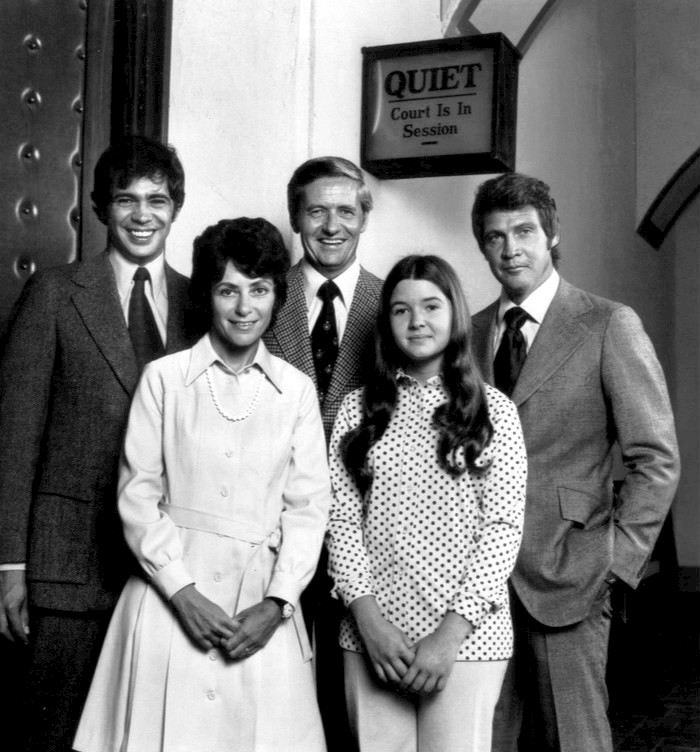
Cast of Owen Marshall, Counselor at Law (1973). Back, L-R: Reni Santoni, Arthur Hill, Lee Majors. Front: Joan Darling and Christine Matchett

Joan Darling (née Kugell; born April 14, 1935) is an American actress, film and television director and a dramatic arts instructor.

== Biography ==
Born Joan Kugell in Newton, Massachusetts and raised in neighboring Brookline, she is the oldest of four children born to Helen Kerner and attorney Simon Harris Kugell, who started the Boston University Law Review. She attended Brookline High School, Carnegie Institute of Technology, and the University of Texas.

From 1955 through at least 1958, Kugell performed with the Oregon Shakespeare Festival, gaining favor with both audience and critics for the quality and versatility of her work. In addition, it brought her a 1956 scholarship from the Beta Sigma Phi sorority.

In November 1960 (having, in the interim, married singer Erik Darling, thus acquiring the stage name by which she has since become best known), Darling resumed her career with the New York improvisational theater troupe, "The Premise Players," and soon graduated to off-Broadway and Broadway productions. She appeared in fellow "Premise" player Theodore J. Flicker's The Troublemaker (1964)—her feature film debut—and later his The President's Analyst (1967). She went into television in the 1970s. She was a regular on the law series Owen Marshall, Counselor at Law, playing office secretary to Arthur Hill, Lee Majors, Reni Santoni, and David Soul.

Darling was the first woman nominated for an Emmy for directing. She was nominated four times, winning one. She was nominated two times for a Directors Guild of America award, winning one. She was nominated for an Emmy for her performance of Dorothy Parker in Woven in a Crazy Plaid.

Darling directed episodes of the television series Rhoda, Doc, Taxi, Hizzonner, The Mary Tyler Moore Show, Mary Hartman, Mary Hartman, Magnum, P.I., Steven Spielberg's Amazing Stories, M*A*S*H, and The Bionic Woman. She directed the famous "Chuckles Bites the Dust" episode of The Mary Tyler Moore Show and received a 1976 Emmy nomination for Outstanding Directing in a Comedy Series. She directed "The Nurses" episode of M*A*S*H and received a 1977 Emmy nomination for her directing efforts there as well. She also directed feature films such as First Love (1977), The Check Is in the Mail (1986), and a number of television movies.

In December 1987, an inside joke/homage to the then-52-year-old actress/director's career was evidently being made when the character portrayed by Darling in the "Have Yourself a Merry Little Christmas" episode of Jake and the Fatman (that of "an assistant DA [who] has trouble convincing ['Fatman' McCabe] she's stumbled onto a possible homicide case"), was assigned Darling's own birth name, Joan Kugell.

In 1976, Darling broke new ground when she directed the feature film First Love. At the time, she was part of a small circle of women directors to direct a major Hollywood studio feature film.

== Personal life ==
Darling was married three times. The first marriage, to physicist Robert Klein, began in 1954 and was dissolved two years later, while the second—to folksinger Erik Darling — commenced on September 28, 1958, and lasted roughly five years before ending in divorce. She kept his surname professionally, though. Since 1966, Darling has been married to Bill Svanoe, a bandmate of Erik Darling in The Rooftop Singers, later a writer and a professor at UNC-Chapel Hill.

== Partial filmography as director ==
- The Mary Tyler Moore Show (TV series)

Episode 7, season 6, "Chuckles Bites the Dust", 1975.

- Doc (TV series)

All 4 episodes in season 1, 1975.

- Rhoda (TV series)

Episode 11, second 2, "Love Songs of J. Nicholas Lobo", 1975.

- Mary Hartman, Mary Hartman (TV series)

Season 1, episodes 1-21, 36, 39 (23 total). In particular, Joan Darling directed all 20 episodes airing in the first month of the show.

- Phyllis (TV series)

Episodes 9, 12, 20 of season 1 and episode 5 of season 2 (4 total).

- M* A* S* H (TV series)

Episode 5, season 5 ("The Nurses"), 1976.

- First Love (1977 feature film)
- Taxi (TV series)
- a.k.a. Pablo (TV series), 3 episodes
- Steven Spielberg's Amazing Stories (TV series), 2 episodes
- Magnum, P.I. (TV series)
- Doogie Howser, M.D. (TV series), 4 episodes
