= Bach Dancing & Dynamite Society =

Music venue in Half Moon Bay, California

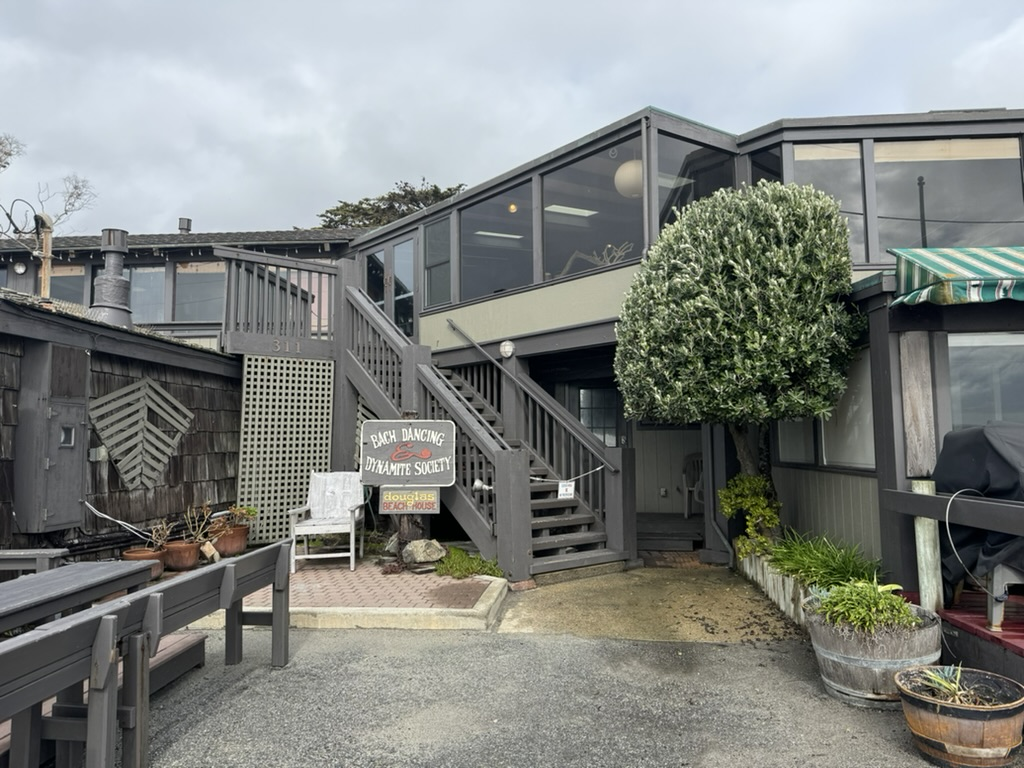
- Interactive map of Bach Dancing & Dynamite Society
- Address: 311 Mirada Road
- Location: Half Moon Bay, California
- Coordinates: 37.4946°N 122.46134°W
- Owner: Barbara Douglas Riching
- Capacity: 200
- Type: Music venue
- Event: Jazz

Construction
- Opened: 1964

Website
- www.bachddsoc.org

The Bach Dancing & Dynamite Society is an oceanfront non-profit music venue located at the Douglas Beach House in Half Moon Bay, California.

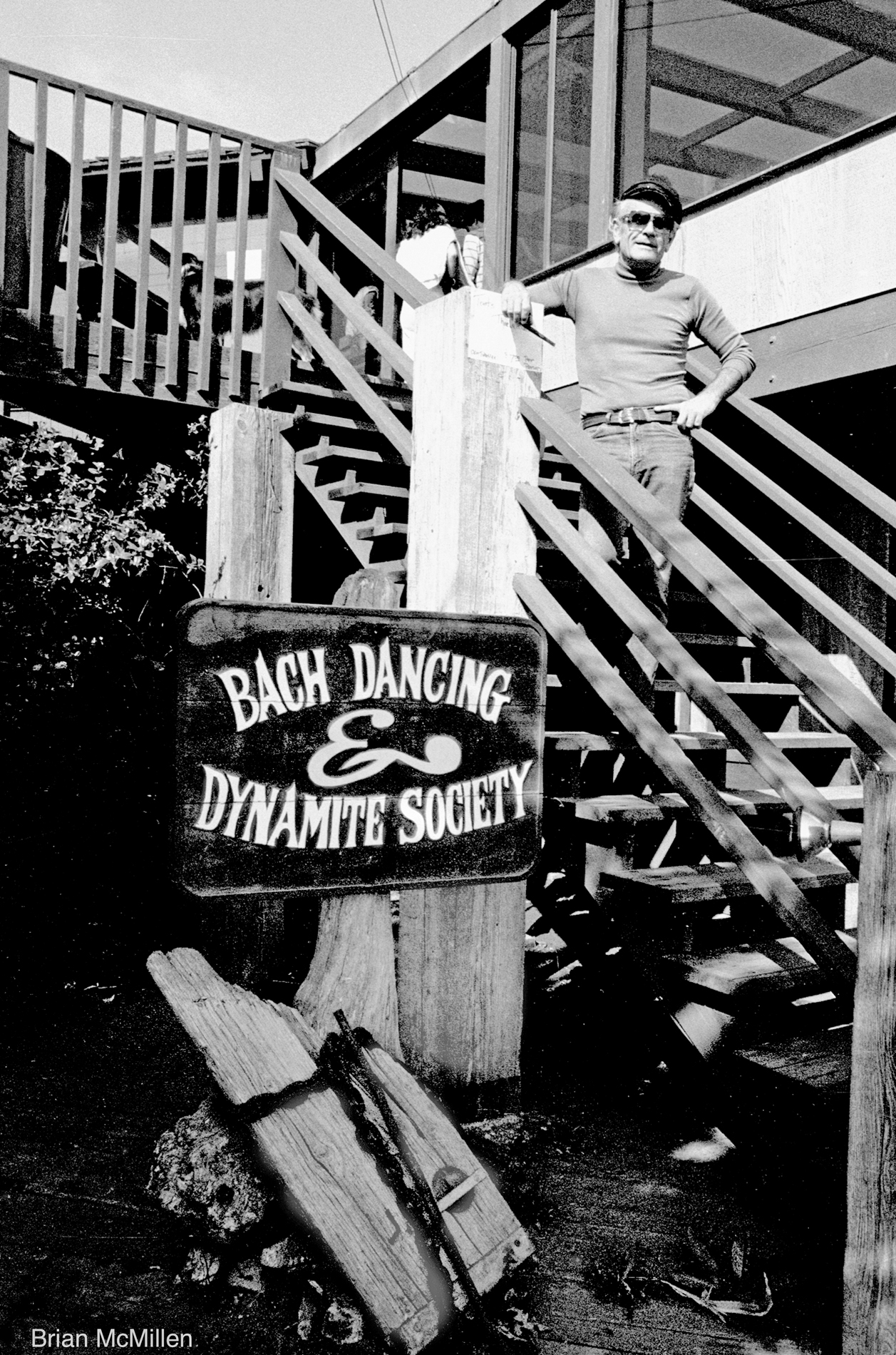
Pete Douglas (1929-2014), founder and proprietor of the Bach Dancing & Dynamite Society in Half Moon Bay CA

The venue was founded in 1964 by Pete Douglas and is now run by his daughter, Barbara Douglas Riching.

Pete Douglas moved to Half Moon Bay in 1957. He purchased a beer joint and ran it as the Ebb Tide Cafe.

The society's name came from an informal party hosted at the Ebb Tide Cafe in 1963. While Pete and his guests danced to a Bach Brandenburg Concertos, others lit dynamite nearby on the beach. A guest suggested they call themselves the Bach Dancing & Dynamite Society and they incorporated under that name soon afterwards.

Today a member-supported non-profit, the Bach has hosted performances for more than fifty years, often featuring jazz musicians visiting the San Francisco Bay Area on larger tours.

Musicians who have performed at the Bach include Duke Ellington, Dexter Gordon, Stan Getz, Dizzy Gillespie, Count Basie and Etta James.

The Bach is listed in the DownBeat 2024 International Jazz Venue Guide as presenting "world-class jazz in an intimate setting with stunning views of the ocean."

Performers at the Bach Dancing & Dynamite Society
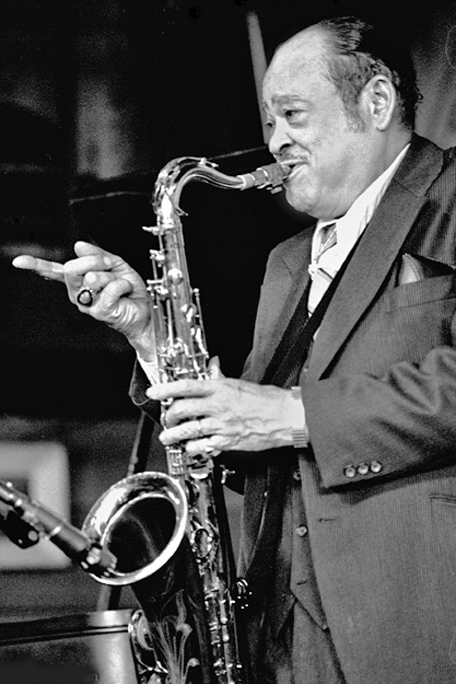
Arnett Cobb, 1979

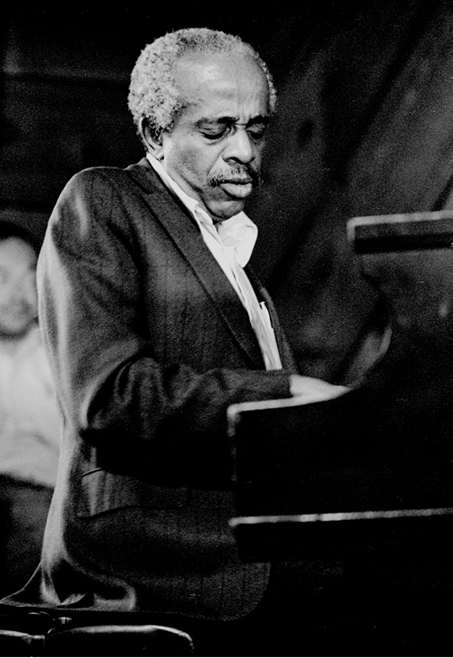
Barry Harris, 1981

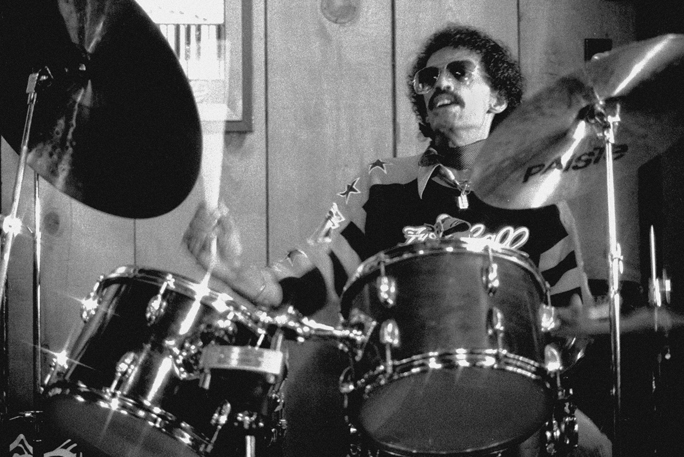
Dannie Richmond, 1981

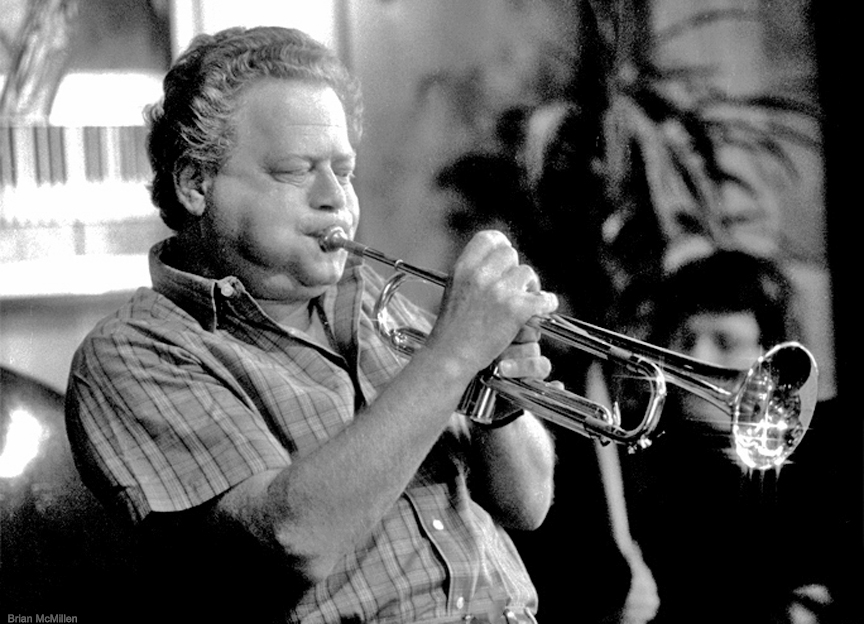
Red Rodney, 1982

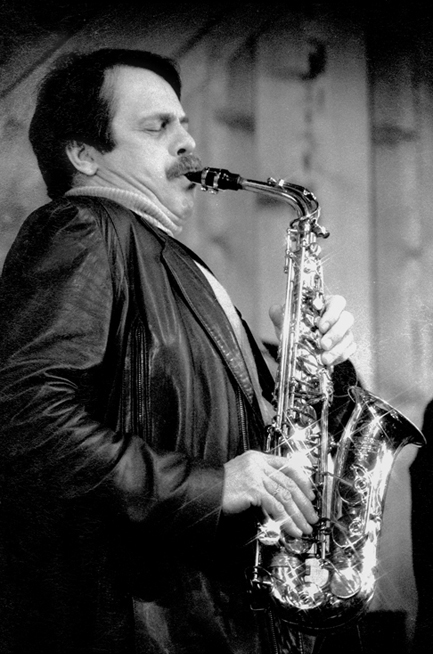
Phil Woods, 1983

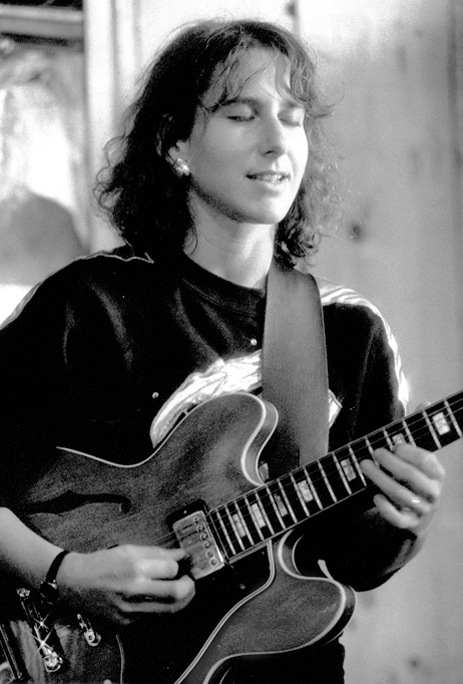
Emily Remler, 1984

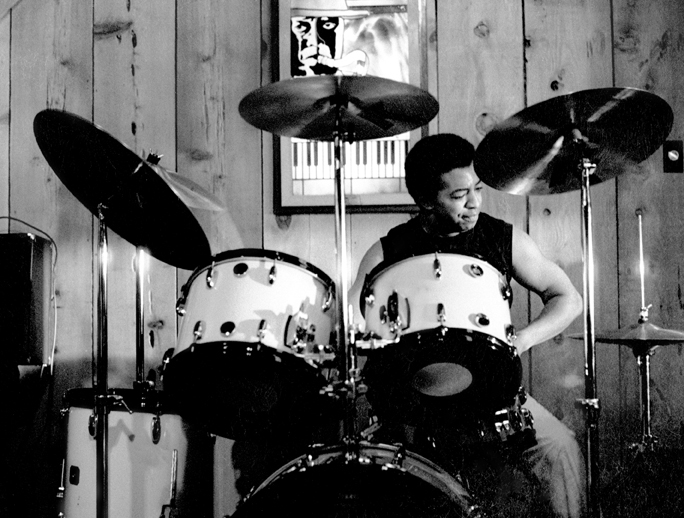
Tony Williams, 1986

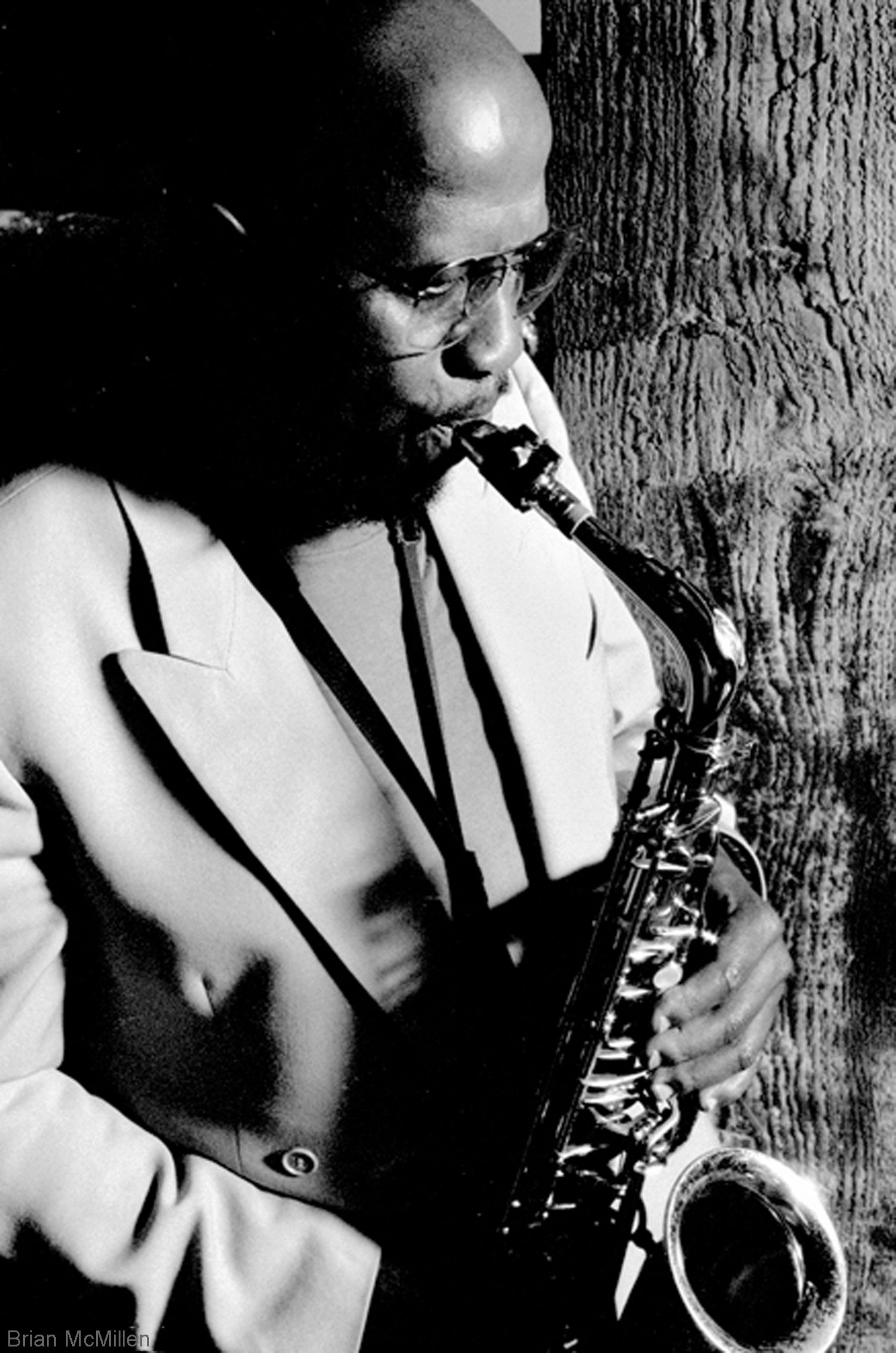
John Handy, 1987

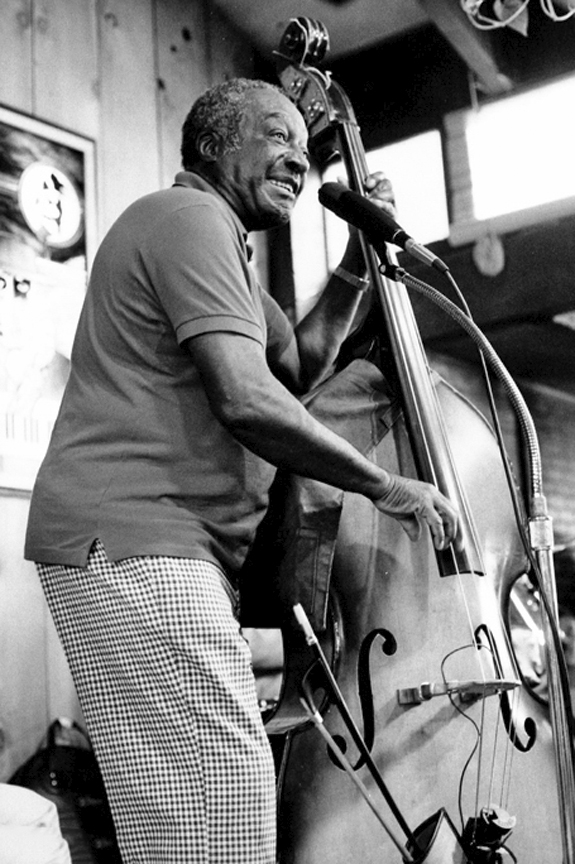
Milt Hinton, 1987

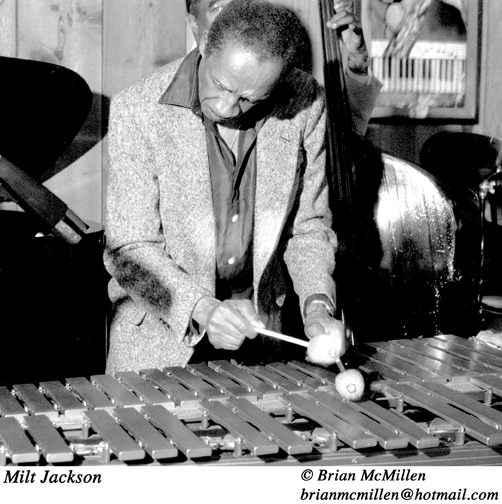
Milt Jackson, 1980s

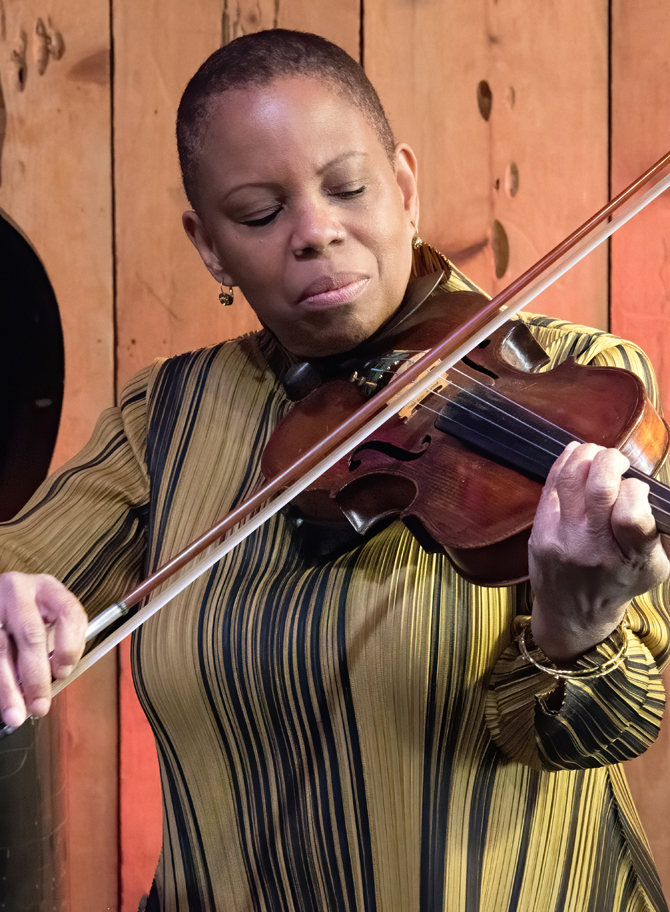
Regina Carter, 2020

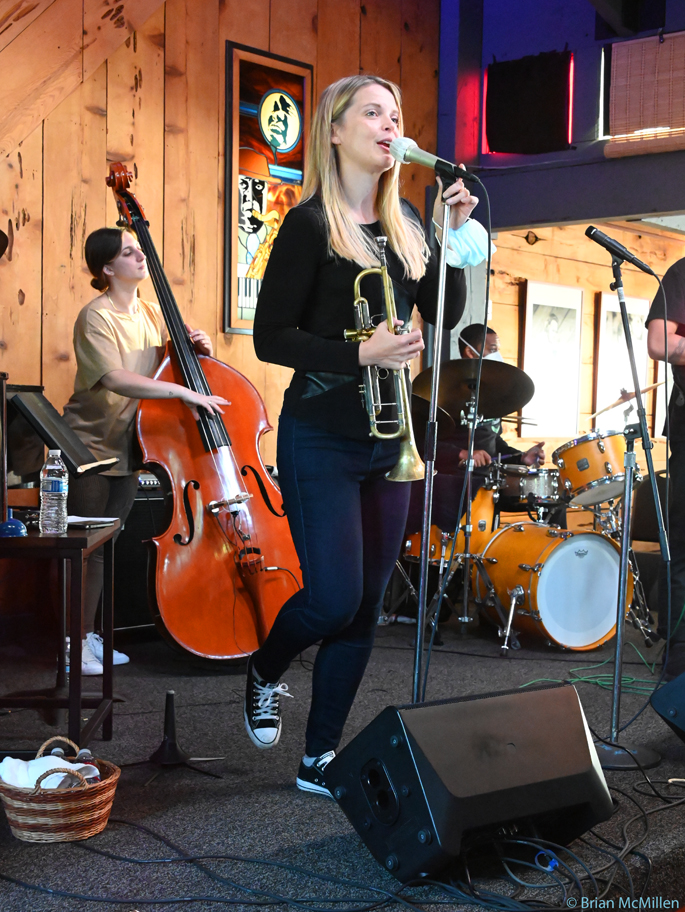
Bria Skonberg, 2021
Photos taken at the venue
