= Tommy Wolf =

American composer and pianist (1925–1979)

Thomas Joseph Wolf Jr. (1925 – 1979) was an American composer and piano player. He was best known for his songwriting collaboration with Fran Landesman.

== Life ==
Born in St. Louis, Missouri, Wolf met Fran Landesman while playing piano at the Jefferson Hotel there. She showed him a poem which he set to music. The resulting song "This Little Love of Ours" began a collaboration that continued for more than a decade.

Wolf's albums include "Wolf at Your Door," and "Spring Can Really Hang You Up the Most", both recorded for Fraternity Records.

After moving to California, he was a rehearsal pianist, working on the Andy Williams and Red Skelton television shows, and numerous musical specials, most memorably the award-winning Fred Astaire show "Evenings."

Several of Wolf's songs, including "Spring Can Really Hang You Up the Most", have become Jazz standards, and have been recorded by artists such as Kurt Elling, Carmen McRae, Sarah Vaughan, Barbra Streisand, and Ella Fitzgerald.

In the 1960s Wolf switched to lyric writing, collaborating with Fred Astaire on "Life Is Beautiful" and Victor Feldman on "A Face Like Yours". He worked on television shows in Utah with Donnie Osmond and Marie Osmond until shortly before his death on January 9, 1979.

== Selected works ==
Broadway musicals

- The Nervous Set (1959)

Songs (partial list) composed with Fran Landesman

- The Ballad of the Sad Young Men (1959)
- Fun Life
- How Do You Like Your Love?
- It Wasn't So Good It Couldn't Get Better
- I've Got A Lot To Learn About Life (1959)
- Laugh, I Thought I'd Die
- Listen, Little Girl
- Man, We're Beat
- Night People
- Spring Can Really Hang You Up The Most (1955); written for the show The Nervous Set (1959), but not used.
- Travel The Road Of Love
