= Jackie Cain =

American jazz singer (1928–2014)

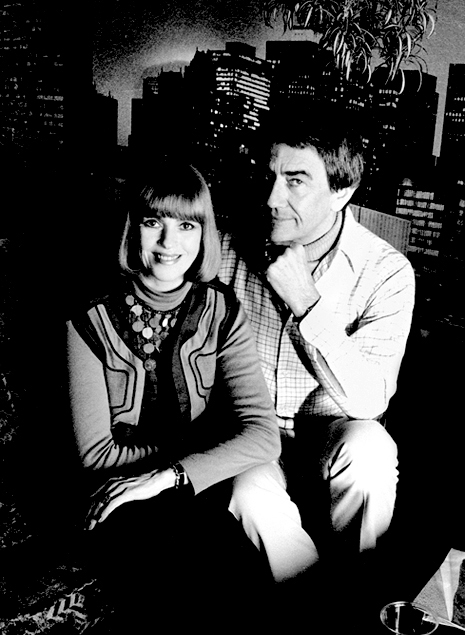
- Jackie Cain and Roy Kral at Bach Dancing & Dynamite Society, Half Moon Bay, California, 1982

Background information
- Born: Jacqueline Ruth Cain; May 22, 1928; Milwaukee, Wisconsin, U.S.
- Died: September 15, 2014 (aged 86) Montclair, New Jersey
- Genres: Jazz, vocal jazz
- Occupation: Singer
- Years active: 1946–2007
- Formerly of: Jackie and Roy

Jacqueline Ruth Cain (May 22, 1928 – September 15, 2014) was an American jazz singer known for her partnership with her husband in the duo Jackie and Roy. She was the sister-in-law of singer Irene Kral.

== Life and career ==
Born in Milwaukee, Wisconsin, Cain was the daughter of an office furniture salesman who also managed a community theater. After her parents' divorce, she and her mother, who took a job with a photo-imaging company, moved to a rooming house. Cain first became interested in music through listening to the radio and performing in the chorus at her elementary school. While in high school she performed in an a cappella chorus during the school day and began performing on a children's radio show and with a band organized by a local music store in Milwaukee.

At the age of 17, Cain accepted her first full-time job in music as a singer with Jay Burkhart's band. In 1947, at the age of 19, she was introduced to Roy Kral by Bob Anderson, a fellow member of the Burkhart band. The couple soon began performing together in clubs in Chicago, and in 1949 they married. They recorded nearly forty albums for record labels such as Columbia and Verve.

Cain died at her home in Montclair, New Jersey, aged 86, on September 15, 2014, from complications of a stroke she suffered in 2010.

== Critical reception ==
Douglas Martin of The New York Times called Jackie and Roy "the most famous vocal duo in jazz history".

== Discography ==
Solo

- So Many Stars (Audiophile, 2000)

With others

- George Davis Quartet, "Jubilee"/"I Only Have Eyes for You" (Aristocrat, 1947)
- Everything I Love, Bill Kirchner (Evening Star, 2004)
- 85 Candles: Live in New York, Marian McPartland (Concord Jazz, 2005)

== Sources ==
- Richard Cook & Brian Morton: The Penguin Guide to Jazz on CD, sixth edition, London, Penguin, 2002
