= Roy Kral =

American jazz musician

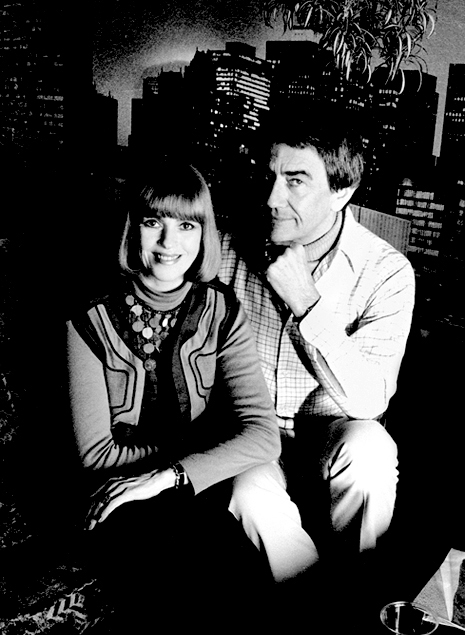
Jackie Cain and Roy Kral at Bach Dancing & Dynamite Society, Half Moon Bay, California, 1982

Roy Kral (October 10, 1921 – August 2, 2002) was an American jazz pianist, arranger, and vocalist. Known for his partnership with his wife Jackie Cain as the duo Jackie and Roy, he was also the brother of the singer Irene Kral and the father of actress Tiffany Bolling.

== Early years ==
Born in Cicero, Illinois, Kral's parents were Joseph F. and Georgiana Kral. His father was a politician in Cicero. As a child, Kral studied classical piano, but his interest changed to jazz in the 1930s.

== Career ==
During World War II, Kral served in the Army as an arranger for the Army band. When he returned to Chicago, he joined the George Davis Quartet. While working with this quartet he met the singer Jackie Cain with whom he formed the duo, Jackie and Roy. The couple became well known in the 1940s and 1950s for their unusual duets which often employed quick-witted lyrics and adept vocalese. Jackie was also admired as a solo ballad singer. In 1948 the duo joined Charlie Ventura's band with Kral serving as the band's pianist as well as an arranger. Particularly successful for the band were arrangements by Kral of the jazz standards "Flamingo" and "Pennies from Heaven". The couple left Ventura's band shortly before their marriage in June 1949, and afterwards performed briefly as a part of a bop sextet organized by Kral.

In 1950 Kral and his wife moved to Chicago, where they appeared in their own television show. In 1953 they returned to Ventura's band for an eighth month period, and then after were active as performers in New York and Los Angeles in the mid 1950s. From 1957–1960 the duo performed in Las Vegas. The singer Anita O’Day temporarily replaced Jackie as part of the duo on periodic occasions in the 1950s during the births of the couple's two daughters. In 1963 Kral and his family settled in New York City. In that city Kral became active as a composer of jingles for television commercials, and Jackie and Roy appeared in many commercials in the 1960s. The duo continued to record and tour internationally in performance into the 1990s.

== Personal life ==
Kral and Cain married in 1949. They had three daughters.

== Death ==
Kral died of congestive heart failure in Montclair, New Jersey. He was 80 years old.

== Discography ==
As Jackie & Roy

- Time and Love (CTI 6019)
- High Standards (Concord CJ 186)
- Lovesick (Verve V6 8688)
- Star Sounds (Concord CJ 115)
- Changes (Verve V 8668)
- A Wilder Alias (CTI 6040)
- The Soundheim Collection (Finesse FW 38324)
- Sing Baby Sing (Storyville STLP 915)
- The Glory of Love (ABC Paramount ABC 120)
- Free and Easy with the Bill Holman Orchestra (ABC Paramount ABC 207)
- In the Spotlight (ABC Paramount ABC 267)

With Don Sebesky

- Giant Box (CTI, 1973)
