= Maynard Ferguson discography =

- Studio albums: 45
- Live albums: 8
- Compilation albums: 12
- Singles: 23

The discography of Canadian trumpeter Maynard Ferguson consists of 45 studio albums, 8 live albums, 12 compilations, 23 singles, along with many contributions as sideman, backing orchestra, or member of a studio orchestra.

== As leader ==
=== Albums ===
==== Studio albums ====
Year	Label	Catalog #	Title
1954	EmArcy	MG 26017	Maynard Ferguson's Hollywood Party (10")
1955	EmArcy	MG 36009	Jam Session featuring Maynard Ferguson
1955	EmArcy	MG 36021	Maynard Ferguson Octet
1955	EmArcy	MG 36044	Dimensions
1956	EmArcy	MG 36076	Around the Horn with Maynard Ferguson
1957	EmArcy	MG 36114	Boy with Lots of Brass
1959	Roulette	SR-25058 (Note: When an album was originally released both in mono and stereo, the stereo catalog number (often just a change in prefix) is used.)	Swingin' My Way Through College
1959	Roulette	SR-52038	Maynard Ferguson Plays Jazz for Dancing
1960	Roulette	SR-52047	Newport Suite
1960	Roulette	SR-52055	Let's Face the Music and Dance
1961	Roulette	SR-52064	Maynard '61
1961	Roulette	SR-52076 (Note: While "Straightaway" Jazz Themes was released both in mono and stereo, there information available (examples) that confirms that a different catalog number was used to indicate a difference in channel information. R was used for Mono and SR was used for Stereo)	"Straightaway" Jazz Themes
1962	Roulette	SR-52083	Maynard '62
1962	Roulette	SR-52084	Si! Si! M.F.
1963	Roulette	SR-52090	Maynard '63
1963	Roulette	SR-52101	Message from Maynard
1963	Roulette	SR-52107	Maynard '64
1963	Cameo	C-1046	The New Sounds of Maynard Ferguson
1963	Cameo	C-1066	Come Blow Your Horn
1964	Mainstream	S/6031	Color Him Wild
1964	Mainstream	S/6045	The Blues Roar
1965	Mainstream	S/6060	The Maynard Ferguson Sextet
1968	Enterprise	S 13-101	Ridin' High
1968	MPS (Germany) (Note: Unless otherwise noted, all albums listed originated in the United States.)	MPS 15 166 ST	Trumpet Rhapsody (reissued as Maynard Ferguson 1969)
1969	CBS (UK)	S 63514	The Ballad Style of Maynard Ferguson (with the Keith Mansfield Orchestra)
1970	Columbia	C 30466	M.F. Horn (also released as The World of Maynard Ferguson)
1971	Columbia	C 31117	Maynard Ferguson (also released as Alive and Well in London)
1972	Columbia	KC 31709	M.F. Horn Two
1973	Columbia	KC 32403	M.F. Horn 3
1973	Columbia	KG 32732	M.F. Horn 4&5: Live At Jimmy's
1974	Columbia	KC 33007	Chameleon
1976	Columbia	PC 33953	Primal Scream
1977	Columbia	PC 34457	Conquistador
1977	Columbia	JC 34971	New Vintage
1978	Columbia	JC 35480	Carnival
1979	Columbia	JC 36124	Hot
1980	Columbia	JC 36766	It's My Time
1982	Columbia	FC 37713	Hollywood
1983	Nautilus	NR 57	Storm
1986	Blackhawk	BKH 50101 (LP); BKH 501-2 (CD)	Body & Soul
1987	Intima	SJ-73279 (LP); CDI-73279 (CD)	High Voltage
1989	Intima	7 73360-1 (LP); 7 73360-2 (CD)	High Voltage 2
1990	Intima	7 73390-1 (LP); 7 73390-2 (CD)	Big Bop Nouveau
1995	Concord	CCD-4669	These Cats Can Swing! (with Big Bop Nouveau)
1996	Concord	CCD-4729	One More Trip to Birdland (with Big Bop Nouveau)
1998	Concord	CCD-4848-2	Brass Attitude (with Big Bop Nouveau)
2007			The One and Only Maynard Ferguson (with Big Bop Nouveau)

==== Live albums ====
Year	Label	Catalog #	Title
1958	Roulette	SR-52012	A Message from Newport
1959	Roulette	SR-52027	A Message from Birdland
1974	Columbia	KG 32732	M.F. Horn 4&5: Live At Jimmy's
1985	Palo Alto	PA 8077	Live from San Francisco
1992	Avion	AVCD 2003	Footpath Café (with Big Bop Nouveau)
1994	Avenue Jazz/Rhino	R2 71631	Live from London
2006	Maynard Ferguson Music		M.F. Horn VI: Live at Ronnie's

==== Compilation albums ====
- This list of compilations does not include any releases that are simply bundles of 2 or more complete albums.

Year	Label	Catalog #	Title
1964	Wyncote	SW-9023	Maynard Ferguson
1972	Roulette	2432 010	The Big Band Sound of Maynard Ferguson
1964	Roulette	SR-52110	The World of Maynard Ferguson
1965	Roulette	SK-101	The Maynard Ferguson Years
1974	Mainstream	MRL 805	The Big 'F'
1976	Mercury	EMS-2-406	Stratospheric
1980	Columbia	JC 36361	The Best of Maynard Ferguson
1981	Columbia	PC 36978	Maynard
1993	Columbia/Legacy	CK 52928	The Essence of Maynard Ferguson
1996	Columbia/Legacy	CK 64970	This Is Jazz 16
2007	Columbia/Legacy	88697 05164 2	The Essential Maynard Ferguson
2007	Concord Jazz	CCD-30214-2	On a High Note: The Best of the Concord Jazz Recordings

==== Box sets ====
Year	Label	Catalog #	Title
1994	Mosaic	MD10-156	The Complete Roulette Recordings of the Maynard Ferguson Orchestra (Contains previously unreleased material)

=== Singles ===
Year	Label	Catalog #	Title	Album
1950	Capitol	1269; 10" 78 RPM (Note: Unless otherwise indicated, all singles are 7" 45 RPM.)	Band Ain't Draggin' b/w Love Locked Out	
1950	Capitol	6F-1713	The Hot Canary b/w What's New? Accompanied by the Kenton Orchestra	
1958	Roulette	R-4084	Yesterday b/w Indiscreet	
1960	Roulette	R-4207	Hey There b/w Let's Fall in Love	Maynard Ferguson Plays Jazz for Dancing
1960	Roulette	R-4250	Doin' the Madison (Part 1 b/w Part 2)	
1960	Roulette	R-4317	Christmas for Moderns	
1960	Roulette	SSR-8016	Secret Love b/w Don'cha Go 'Way Mad	Maynard Ferguson Plays Jazz for Dancing
1960	Roulette	SSR-33-8034; 33 1/3 RPM	Let's Face the Music and Dance (Special jukebox issue) b/w Teach Me Tonight	Maynard Ferguson Plays Jazz for Dancing
1960	Roulette	SSR-33-8035; 33 1/3 RPM	The Party's Over (Special jukebox issue) b/w It Could Happen to You	Maynard Ferguson Plays Jazz for Dancing
1960	Roulette	SSR-33-8036; 33 1/3 RPM	It's Only a Paper Moon (Special jukebox issue) b/w You Don't Know What Love Is	Maynard Ferguson Plays Jazz for Dancing
1960	Roulette	SSR-33-8037; 33 1/3 RPM	My Foolish Heart (Special jukebox issue) b/w (I'm Afraid) The Masquerade Is Over	Maynard Ferguson Plays Jazz for Dancing
1960	Roulette	SSR-33-8038; 33 1/3 RPM	Let's Do It (Special jukebox issue) b/w Don't Take Your Love from Me	Maynard Ferguson Plays Jazz for Dancing
1962	Roulette	R-4421	Hip Twist b/w Maria	
1963	Cameo	C-261	Anthony and Cleopatra b/w Theme from "Naked City"	Come Blow Your Horn
1963	Cameo	C-275	Blues for a Four String Guitar b/w Groove	Come Blow Your Horn
1964	Mainstream	603	People b/w Macarena	Color Him Wild
1970	Columbia	4-45352	MacArthur Park b/w Eli's Comin'	M.F. Horn
1977	Columbia	3-10468	Gonna Fly Now (Theme from "Rocky") b/w The Fly	Conquistador
1977	Columbia	3-10595	Main Title (From the 20th Century-Fox Film "Star Wars") b/w Oasis	New Vintage
1977	Columbia	3-10678	Maria (From "West Side Story") b/w Oasis	New Vintage
1978	Columbia	3-10823	Theme from "Battlestar Galactica" b/w M.F. Carnival	Carnival
1979	Columbia	3-11037	Rocky II Disco b/w Gabriel	Hot
1979	Columbia	1-11151	Theme from Star Trek b/w Topa-Topa Woman	Hot

== As sideman ==
=== Studio albums ===
Year	Label	Catalog #	Artist	Title
1953	Capitol	T-383	Stan Kenton	New Concepts of Artistry in Rhythm
1955	Capitol	T-248	Stan Kenton	Stan Kenton Presents
1955	Bethlehem	BCP-46	Frances Faye	I'm Wild Again (on trombone)
1955	Pacific Jazz	PJ 1213	Bud Shank	Strings & Trombones (on trombone)
1956	Capitol	W-724	Stan Kenton	Kenton in Hi-Fi
1956	EmArcy	MG 36060	Georgie Auld	In the Land of Hi-Fi (on trombone)
1956	Bethlehem	BCP-46	Russ Garcia	Four Horns and a Lush Life
1957	Verve	MGV-2042	Buddy Bregman	Swinging Kicks
1960?	Wyncote	W 9161	Frankie Laine	Frankie Laine and His Guests (Danny Boy)
1979	Columbia	FC 36105	Chicago	Chicago 13 ("Street Player")

=== Live albums ===
Year	Label	Catalog #	Artist	Title
1954	EmArcy	MG 36000	Dinah Washington	Dinah Jams

== As backing orchestra ==
Year	Label	Catalog #	Artist	Title
1961	Atlantic	SD 8049	Chris Connor	Double Exposure
1961	Roulette	SR-52068	Chris Connor	Two's Company
1999	Concord	CCD-4869-2	Michael Feinstein	Big City Rhythms
2001	Concord	CCD-4982-2	Diane Schuur	Swingin' for Schuur

== Appearances ==
=== Live albums ===
Year	Label	Catalog #	Title
1955	EmArcy	MG 36002	Jam Session
1955	Vik	LX-1070	Birdland Dream Band
1955	Vik	LX-1077	Birdland Dream Band, Volume 2
1977	Columbia	JG 35005	Montreux Summit, Volume 1
1978	Columbia	JG 35090	Montreux Summit, Volume 2

=== Compilation albums ===
Year	Label	Catalog #	Album	Title
1961	Roulette	R-52050	The Most, Volume I	Frame for the Blues
1961	Roulette	R-52062	The Most, Volume IV	Got the Spirit
1961	Roulette	R-52075	The Most, Volume V	Coldwater Canyon Blues
1962	Roulette	R-25175	The Most of the Twist	Hip Twist

=== Soundtrack albums ===
Year	Label	Catalog #	Title
1953	Decca	DL 5515	Jazz Themes from The Wild One
1955	Columbia	CL-727	The Rose Tattoo
1956	Decca	DL 8257	The Man with the Golden Arm
1956	Dot	DLP 3054-D	Music from the Sound Track of Cecil B. DeMille's Production "The Ten Commandments"
1957	Verve	MG V-15001	Funny Face
1957	Decca	DL 8449	Omar Khayyam / The Mountain
1957	Epic	LN 3403	Dino
1972	CBS	S 65403	La prima notte di quiete
1978	United Artists	UA-LA935-H	Uncle Joe Shannon
