= The Essence of Maynard Ferguson =

Compilation album by Maynard Ferguson
- Released: January 19, 1993
- Recorded: 1970–1980
- Genre: Jazz, jazz fusion, big band, bop
- Length: 50:07
- Label: Columbia/Legacy

Maynard Ferguson chronology
Footpath Café (1992)	The Essence of Maynard Ferguson (1993)	Live from London (1994)

The Essence of Maynard Ferguson is the third compilation album by Canadian jazz trumpeter Maynard Ferguson on Columbia Records. It was released in 1993 as part of Columbia/Legacy's budget line I Like Jazz series (often sporting Sony's "Nice Price" stickers at retail). At the time of its release, this was the only Compact disc available containing many of Maynard's recordings for Columbia.

== Critical reception ==
Professional ratings
Review scores
Source	Rating
AllMusic	3/5 stars

AllMusic's Matt Collar stated simply – "A single-disc, budget-line compilation, The Essence of Maynard Ferguson brings together a handful of tracks the legendary high-note trumpeter recorded during the 1970s."

== Track listing ==
No.	Title	Writer(s)	Original album	Length
1.	"Primal Scream"	Jay Chattaway / Maynard Ferguson	Primal Scream	7:11
2.	"'Round Midnight"	Thelonious Monk / Cootie Williams / Bernie Hanighen	M.F. Horn 3	4:48
3.	"The Fox Hunt"	Mike Abene	M.F. Horn 4&5: Live At Jimmy's	4:01
4.	"Everybody Loves the Blues"	Ferguson, Nick Lane	It's My Time	7:15
5.	"Conquistador"	Chattaway, Ferguson	Conquistador	7:31
6.	"Birdland"	Joe Zawinul	Carnival	5:38
7.	"I Can't Get Started" (Vocals by Maynard Ferguson)	Ira Gershwin, Vernon Duke	Chameleon	3:45
8.	"MacArthur Park"	Jimmy Webb	M.F. Horn	9:58

- Times shown are the correct lengths. (Note: Times listed for most of the tracks are incorrect, and the times shown are as reported by (as opposed to printed on) the CD itself. The source of these errors is unknown. Unfortunately, these have been accepted without verification, and reported as fact in other sources. While some of the tracks report the same length as their source albums, some are slightly longer ("Primal Scream", "I Can't Get Started") or slightly shorter ("Conquistador"), these minor alterations are a side-effect of assembling these LP tracks on Compact disc, not a result of altering the recording. The extra time on "The Fox Hunt" is simply to allow the applause to fade.)

== Personnel ==
=== Compilation ===
- Producer: Nedra Olds-Neal
- Digital Remaster: Mark Wilder, Sony Music Studios, New York
- Product Manager: Penny Armstrong
- Packaging Coordinator: Gina Campanaro
- Art Direction: Allen Weinberg
- Graphic Artist: Kim Gaucher
