= The Best of Maynard Ferguson =

Compilation album by Maynard Ferguson
- Released: 1980
- Genre: Jazz, big band, bop
- Length: 54:10
- Label: Columbia

Maynard Ferguson chronology
Hot (1979)	The Best of Maynard Ferguson (1980)	It's My Time (1980)

The Best of Maynard Ferguson is the first compilation album and 13th overall by Canadian jazz trumpeter Maynard Ferguson on Columbia Records. The 1980 release opens with Maynard's biggest hit "Gonna Fly Now", before going on a tour of some of his best work for Columbia, featuring no less than 4 major theme songs along the way.

== Critical reception ==
Professional ratings
Review scores
Source	Rating
AllMusic	3/5 stars

The Best of Maynard Ferguson was not only an attempt to profit from Maynard's Columbia catalog while he was still in the public eye, it was an opportunity entice listeners to look beyond "Gonna Fly Now", and discover what came both before and after it. As AllMusic's Thom Jurek put it, "For the sake of argument, we'll look at this compilation as a decent if imperfect collection of the period of his greatest popularity..."

== Track listing ==
Side one
No.	Title	Writer(s)	Original album	Length
1.	"Gonna Fly Now (Theme from "Rocky")"	Bill Conti, Carol Connors, Ayn Robbins	Conquistador	4:22
2.	"MacArthur Park"	Jimmy Webb	M.F. Horn 4&5: Live At Jimmy's	8:27
3.	"Theme from Star Trek"	Alexander Courage, Gene Roddenberry	Hot	5:04
4.	"Birdland"	Joe Zawinul	Carnival	5:35
5.	"Give It One"	Alan Downey, Maynard Ferguson	M.F. Horn Two	3:30
Total length:				26:58

Side two
No.	Title	Writer(s)	Original album	Length
1.	"Stella by Starlight"	Victor Young, Ned Washington	Carnival	7:16
2.	"Theme from "Battlestar Galactica""	Stu Phillips, Glen A. Larson	Carnival	5:53
3.	"Pagliacci" (Adapted by Jay Chattaway from the aria Vesti la giubba)	Ruggiero Leoncavallo	Primal Scream	5:53
4.	"Main Title (From the 20th Century-Fox Film "Star Wars")"	John Williams	New Vintage	4:10
5.	"Airegin"	Sonny Rollins	New Vintage	4:00
Total length:				27:12

== Personnel ==
- Liner notes – Mort Goode
- Design – Paula Scher
- Photography: David Gahr
