= Maynard (album) =

Compilation album by Maynard Ferguson
- Released: 1981
- Genre: Jazz, big band, bop
- Length: 49:02; 1:02:33 (Reissue)
- Label: Columbia

Maynard Ferguson chronology
It's My Time (1981)	Maynard (1981)	Hollywood (1982)

Maynard is the second compilation album and 15th overall by Canadian jazz trumpeter Maynard Ferguson on Columbia Records. Another budget-priced album, Maynard was created as part of Columbia's "Jazz Odyssey" series.

In the album's liner notes, noted music critic Mort Goode states "This album underscores Maynard's dedication to the jazz composer."

== Reissues ==
In 2011, Maynard was reissued with bonus tracks (Note: Instead of including additional tracks that would keep with the theme of notable jazz composers, Wounded Bird chose to add the first 2 tracks from the album Hot, which are out of place with the rest of the set.) by Wounded Bird Records.

== Track listing ==
Side one
No.	Title	Writer(s)	Original album	Length
1.	"Airegin"	Sonny Rollins	New Vintage	3:58
2.	"Stay Loose with Bruce"	Ernie Wilkins	M.F. Horn 4&5: Live At Jimmy's	5:26
3.	"'Round Midnight"	Thelonious Monk / Cootie Williams / Bernie Hanighen	M.F. Horn 3	4:47
4.	"The Cheshire Cat Walk"	Chick Corea	Primal Scream	10:06
Total length:				24:17

Side two
No.	Title	Writer(s)	Original album	Length
1.	"Chameleon"	Paul Jackson, Harvey Mason, Bennie Maupin, Herbie Hancock	Chameleon	4:35
2.	"Birdland"	Joe Zawinul	Carnival	5:38
3.	"Naima"	John Coltrane	Hot	4:36
4.	"Got the Spirit"	Slide Hampton	M.F. Horn 4&5: Live At Jimmy's	9:56
Total length:				24:45

Reissue bonus tracks
No.	Title	Writer(s)	Original album	Length
9.	"Rocky II Disco"	Bill Conti, Carol Connors, Ayn Robbins	Hot	7:09
10.	"Gabriel"	Maynard Ferguson / Nick Lane	Hot	6:22
Total length:				13:31

== Personnel ==
=== Production ===
- Producer for Jazz Odyssey Series, Liner Notes – Mort Goode
- Engineered for Jazz Odyssey Series by Arthur Kendy
- Re-mastered at CBS Recording Studios New York on the CBS DisComputer System by Harry Fein
- Design – John Berg
- Photography By – Benno Friedman
