= Keith Mansfield =

British composer and arranger (born 1941)

- Born: 1940 (age 85–86); Slough, England
- Genres: Television score
- Occupations: Composer, arranger

Keith Mansfield (born 1940 in Slough, England) is a British composer and arranger known for his creation of prominent television theme tunes, including the Grandstand theme for the BBC.

== Career ==
Mansfield's other works include "The Young Scene" (the original 1968 theme to The Big Match), "Light and Tuneful" (the opening theme for the BBC's coverage of the Wimbledon Tennis Championships), "World Champion" (the closing theme for NBC's coverage of the same tournament), and "World Series" (used for the BBC's athletics coverage). One of his library music recordings, "Teenage Carnival", was used as the theme to the 1960s ITV children's television series Freewheelers. He has also composed film scores for British films such as Loot (1970) and Taste of Excitement (1970), and the western Three Bullets for a Long Gun (1971). He also scored the start-up and shutdown themes for Granada Television in 1978, which were used for ten years before it switched to 24-hour television.

Mansfield is perhaps best known by American audiences as the composer of the tune "Funky Fanfare", used for underscoring in NFL Films productions and the Astro Daters series of snipes produced by the National Screen Service in the late 1960s. That song is currently used during the opening credits of the show Pit Boss on Animal Planet, as well as backing music for the "Quick Hits" segment on the Sklarbro Country podcast.

Mansfield also composed the brass tune "Superstar Fanfare", which was used (in several variations) by Channel Television in the Channel Islands, RTL plus's news programme 7 vor 7, Worldvision Enterprises, and by the Services Sound and Vision Corporation (SSVC) as a idents jingle for British Forces TV in West Germany, Berlin, Cyprus, The Falkland Islands and Gibraltar in the 1980s and 1990s.

The Astro Daters' "Our Next Attraction" was featured prominently in two films by Quentin Tarantino; Kill Bill and Death Proof. A vocal version of Funky Fanfare entitled "House of Jack" was also recorded by James Royal in 1969. Another Mansfield composition, "National Pride," was the opening theme to the 1980 film Fist of Fear, Touch of Death, which utilizes Mansfield's library music score, and as the logo jingle for CBS/Fox Video. A song remix was also used in the game, Saints Row: The Third.

In the 1960s and 1970s, Mansfield was a significant figure in the UK library music scene and recorded many materials for the production music company KPM. His work has been sampled by hip-hop producers such as Danger Mouse ("Funky Fanfare" on the Danger Doom track "Old School Rules", "Junior Jet Set" on "Run" by Gnarls Barkley, and "Morning Broadway" on the Danger Doom track "Space Ho's"), Madlib, as well as Fatboy Slim ("Young Scene" on the track "Punk to Funk") and most recently, "Walkin" by Denzel Curry, produced by Kal Banx.

Mansfield was arranger and conductor for several tracks on Dusty Springfield's 1968 UK album Dusty... Definitely, and acted as orchestral arranger on some hits for Love Affair ("Everlasting Love") and Marmalade ("Reflections of My Life"), among others. Mansfield wrote material for and produced albums with trumpeter Maynard Ferguson: M.F. Horn, Maynard Ferguson and M.F. Horn Two.

== Success in Brazil ==
Mansfield was one of the collaborators of Carnaby Street Pop Orchestra (1969). The album did not become famous, but his song, "Hyde Park", was used as the opening theme of the Brazilian sports program Esporte Espetacular since 1977. The song was soon associated with sports in Brazil, and it was used as the theme song of the F-1 racer Ayrton Senna. Esporte Espetacular stopped using the song in the 1980s, but it came back in 1994.

Even though Hyde Park was a success, Mansfield was unknown in Brazil for many years due a printing error in the LP record that wrongly stated his name and the name of the song. The first time he heard about his popularity was in the 1990s. A friend of his was approached by a Brazilian reporter for an interview and he explained that Mansfield was the actual composer, but the story was quickly forgotten. In 2009, Mansfield was intrigued when he discovered by chance that his song was being used on a YouTube video about Bruce Lee, and he soon discovered many other videos created by the Brazilian community. In 2018, he said that it was "a great feeling" that his song was used.
