= Stan Mark =

American trumpet player

- Stan Mark on tour with Maynard Ferguson in Sulphur, LA in 1979

Background information
- Genres: Jazz, jazz fusion, swing
- Occupations: Musician, songwriter
- Instrument: Trumpet
- Years active: 1963–2005
- Label: Progressive
- Website: StanMarkMusic.com

Stan Mark was an American trumpet player.

Mark started his playing career in 1963 with the United States Navy Band in Washington D.C. and later played lead trumpet with the band's jazz ensemble, The Commodores, from 1967 to 1970.

In 1973 Mark joined the trumpet section of Maynard Ferguson's rock-influenced big band and was promoted to lead trumpet within a few months. Mark was visible within the band by his distinctive afro hairstyle and black trumpet. Despite constant personnel changes, Mark remained a fixture with the band until he was fired in 1982, although he maintained a cordial relationship with Ferguson until Ferguson's death in 2006.

Following his departure from the Ferguson band in 1982, Mark began leading a big band of his own in Orlando, recording the album Here's Stan Mark on the Progressive Records label. The band backed numerous singers and appeared on tour as the Nelson Riddle Orchestra and the Jimmy Dorsey Orchestra. Mark taught and performed in clinics in high schools and Universities around the world.

In early 1993 Stan began touring the United States as lead trumpet player with the Glenn Miller Orchestra. Mark also played lead trumpet with the Sorta Dixie Jazz Band/Gold Coast Orchestra from 1993 to 1996. While in Las Vegas, Mark led a Swing Band, the Sin City SuitZ. In 2002, Mark relocated from Las Vegas to the Rogue Valley of Southern Oregon, leading both a big band and a smaller group called the Rogue Valley SuitZ.

Mark largely retired from the music business in 2005, although he did perform as a soloist and ensemble member at Maynard Ferguson's memorial service in St. Louis, MO on September 20, 2006.

Stan died in December 2022.

== Discography ==
- 1970: Presents the Commodores (with the United States Navy Band)

=== With Maynard Ferguson ===
- 1974: Chameleon (with Maynard Ferguson) Columbia Records
- 1975: Primal Scream (with Maynard Ferguson)
- 1976: Conquistador (with Maynard Ferguson)
- 1977: New Vintage (with Maynard Ferguson)
- 1978: Carnival (with Maynard Ferguson)
- 1979: Hot (with Maynard Ferguson)
- 1980: It's My Time (with Maynard Ferguson)
- 1981: Hollywood (with Maynard Ferguson)
- 1982: Storm (with Maynard Ferguson)

=== Stan Mark as bandleader ===
- 1983: Here's Stan Mark and his Big Band
- 1987: The Joint is Jumpin' (Stan Mark and his River City StomperZ)
- 1991: Jubilee (Stan Mark and his River City StomperZ)
- 1992: Welcome Aboard (Stan Mark and his River City StomperZ)
- 1994: Collector's Edition (with the Sorta Dixie Jazz Band)
- 1995: Reflections (with the Sorta Dixie Jazz Band)
- 1997: Rock This Town! (Stan Mark and his Hot HornZ)
- 1997: The Best of Stan Mark (Stan Mark and his Hot HornZ)
- 1999: These SuitZ Can Swing! (Stan Mark and his Sin Sity SuitZ)
- 1999: Remembering Harry (Stan Mark Big Band)
- 2001: Still Swinging! (Stan Mark and his Sin Sity SuitZ)
- 2003: The Next Generation (Stan Mark and his Rogue Valley SuitZ)
