= Jimmy Ryan's =

Jazz club in New York City

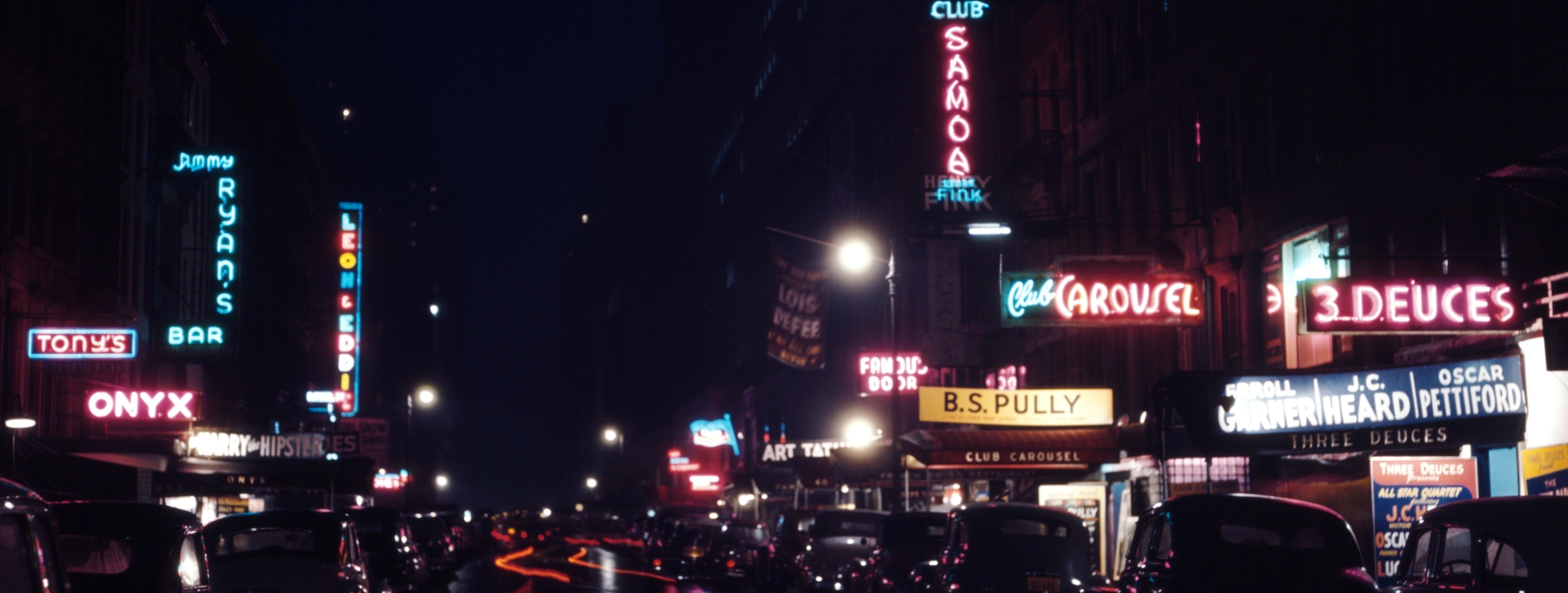
- Jimmy Ryan's marquee at night, alongside its neighbors. Looking east from Sixth Avenue towards 52nd Street, c. May 1948
- Interactive map of Jimmy Ryan's
- Address: 53 West 52nd Street (1934–1962); 154 West 54th Street (1962–1983); New York City; United States
- Coordinates: 40°45′47″N 73°58′50″W
- Owner: Matthew C. Walsh, Jimmy Ryan
- Type: Jazz club

Construction
- Demolished: 1962 (53 West 52nd Street)
- Years active: 1934–1962 (53 West 52nd Street); 1962–1983 (154 West 54th Street)

Jimmy Ryan's was a jazz club in New York City, located at 53 West 52nd Street, Manhattan, from 1934 to 1962, and 154 West 54th Street from 1962 to 1983. It was a venue for performances of Dixieland jazz.

== History ==
The location on 52nd Street, Manhattan, New York City, was one of a row of brownstones with clubs operating in basements. As the last surviving jazz club on 52nd Street, its brownstone – along with all the other brownstones on the north side of the street – were demolished in 1962 to make way for construction of the new CBS Building. CBS had given Jimmy Ryan $9,000 to relocate.

The club was owned by partners Matthew C. (Matty) Walsh (1914–2006) and Jimmy Ryan (1911–1963). Walsh, Ryan's brother-in-law, continued ownership following Ryan's death in July 1963 at the French Hospital. Gilbert J. Pincus (1907–1980) – who served as doorman from 1942 to 1962 at the original location and from about 1963 until his death in 1980 – became known as the "Mayor of 52nd Street".

== Jazz style ==
During the 1940s, three New York nightclubs stood out as centers for traditional style jazz: Jimmy Ryan's, Nick's in Greenwich Village, and Eddie Condon's, just a few blocks away.

== Performing artists ==
Resident musicians in the 1940s

- Mezz Mezzrow (1943)
- James P. Johnson (1943)
- Art Hodes (1945–1949)
- J. C. Higginbotham (1946)
- Henry "Red" Allen (1946)
- Sidney De Paris (1947–1957)
- Sidney Bechet (1948)
- Max Kaminsky (1948–1949)
- Wilbur De Paris (1951–1962)
- Zutty Singleton (1963–1970)
- Roy Eldridge (1970–1980)

Musicians of the Sunday jam sessions, organized and managed by Milt Gabler

- Sidney Bechet
- Pops Foster
- Hot Lips Page
- Pee Wee Russell
- Eddie Condon
- Mezz Mezzrow
- Kaiser Marshall
- Hank Duncan
- Sandy Williams
- Brad Gowans
- Ben Webster
- Chu Berry
- Coleman Hawkins
- Wildcats

== Songs and albums related to the club ==
- Tony Parenti and his Dean's of Dixieland:
  - A Night at Jimmy Ryan's (Jazzology, 1967) with Max Kaminsky, Conrad Janis, Davis Quinn, Joe Henshaw, and Zutty Singleton
    - "Down at Jimmy Ryan's", a renamed version of Theodore Morse and Edward Madden's "Down in Jungletown"
    - "Blues for Jimmy Ryan"
- Live at Jimmy's, a complete album recorded live there by Maynard Ferguson in 1973
