= Theme from Star Wars =

"Theme from Star Wars" may refer to:

- "Star Wars Theme/Cantina Band", a 1977 hit by Meco
- "Star Wars (Main Title)", a 1977 movie theme hit by John Williams
- "Star Wars (Main Title Theme)", a cover version by Don Ellis and Survival featured in the 1977 album Music from Other Galaxies and Planets
- "Star Wars", a cover version by Raymond Lefèvre featured in the 1977 album Love in Stereo No.1
- "Theme from Star Wars", a 1977 cover version by Maynard Ferguson
- "Main Theme from Star Wars", a cover version by David Matthews featured in the 1977 album Dune
- "Main Theme from Star Wars", a cover version by The Marty Gold Orchestra featured on the 1978 album Themes from the Movies
- "Main Title from Star Wars", a cover version by Geoff Love and His Orchestra featured in the 1978 album Star Wars and Other Space Themes
- "Star Wars", a cover version by New Zealand Army Band featured in the 1978 album Star Brass
- "Star Wars", a cover version by Phil Pratt featured in the 1978 album Star Wars Dub
- "Star Wars (Main Title)", a cover version by Isao Tomita featured in the 1978 album Kosmos
- "Star Wars Theme ~Cantena Band~", a 1978 cover version of the Meco theme with lyrics by Masato Shimon
- "Star Wars", a cover version by Biddu featured in the 1978 album Disco Gold
- "Main Title from Star Wars", a cover version by Ferrante & Teicher featured in the 1978 album Star Wars
- "Star Wars Samba", a cover version by Masayoshi Takanaka featured in the 1979 album All of Me
- "Star Wars (Main Theme)", a cover version by James Last featured in the 1981 album Hansimania
- "Star Wars", a cover version by The Ventures featured in the 1983 NASA 25th Anniversary Commemorative Album
- "Star Wars Theme", a cover version by The Starlite Orchestra featured in the 1997 album Space Wars

== See also ==
- Music of Star Wars
- Star Wars (soundtrack)
