= Carmen Leggio =

American jazz tenor saxophonist

Carmen Leggio (September 30, 1927 – May 17, 2009) was an American jazz tenor saxophonist.

== Career ==
Leggio was born in Tarrytown, New York and died there on April 17, 2009. In his final years, he performed in clubs and restaurants throughout Westchester County, New York, such as the Red Hat Bistro in Irvington. In 2006 he recorded Three Legends Live at the Division Street Grill with Bucky Pizzarelli and Bill Crow at one of these dates. On April 17, 2009, he suffered a heart attack in front of his home in Tarrytown and died later that day.

From an interview with Leggio conducted by Fred Cicetti, October 1999:

Leggio ("music stand" in Italian) taught himself how to play at the age of nine. He began on clarinet, imitating Artie Shaw on the radio. He performed "Stardust," "Nightmare", and "Begin the Beguine" on a King metal clarinet. At 14, he switched to tenor saxophone and began playing in clubs in his hometown of Tarrytown, a suburb north of New York City.

"I quit high school, because I knew I was meant to be a musician," he said. "But my father was so angry that he didn't speak to me for years. On his deathbed, he admitted I was right to leave school."

That admission came after Leggio had played with Benny Goodman, Maynard Ferguson, Gene Krupa, Woody Herman, Buddy Rich, Dizzy Gillespie, and Doc Severinsen. He performed on television shows, movies, the Newport Jazz Festival, Birdland, and Carnegie Hall.

From Colin Smith, EZRock 99.1:

After playing in local bands, Leggio moved to New York City in 1950, worked with Terry Gibbs, and became a studio musician. His musical associations included Marty Napoleon, Sol Yaged (1956), Benny Goodman (1957), Maynard Ferguson (1958–59), Woody Herman (1963), and during the late 1970s the Thad Jones/Mel Lewis Orchestra.

Leggio played the same instrument since 1961, a Gold Medal SML made in France by Strasser, Marigaux & Lemaire and the same mouthpiece, a Selmer D.

I don't know much about horns and mouthpieces. A friend of mine got me to the right sax and set-up and I just stayed with it because it worked for me. A sax is like a pair of shoes. If you get a pair that are comfortable, you can learn how to do any kind of dance in them.

== Discography ==
=== As leader ===
- The Carmen Leggio Group (Jazz Unlimited, 1961)
- Aerial View (Dreamstreet, 1978)
- Smile (Progressive, 1978)
- Tarrytown Tenor (Famous Door, 1978)
- Cocktails for Three (2005)
- Carmen Leggio Quartet Featuring Joe Cohn (Mighty Quinn, 2007)
- Four x Four with John Cutrone, Bucky Pizzarelli (Cutrone Music, 2009)

=== As sideman ===
With Bill Crow

- From Birdland to Broadway (Venus, 1996)
- Jazz Anecdotes (Venus, 1997)
- From Birdland to Broadway II (Venus, 2009)

With Maynard Ferguson

- Swingin' My Way Through College (Roulette, 1959)
- A Message from Birdland (Roulette, 1959)
- A Message from Newport (Roulette, 1960)
- Maynard Ferguson Plays Jazz for Dancing (Roulette, 1959)
- Maynard '64 (Roulette, 1963)

With others

- Roy Burns, Skin Burns (Roulette, 1963)
- Cal Collins, Ohio Boss Guitar (Famous Door, 1978)
- Jake Hanna, Jake Takes Manhattan (Concord Jazz, 1976)
- Woody Herman, Woody Herman: 1964 (Philips, 1964)
- Butch Miles, Butch's Encore (Famous Door, 1979)
- Marty Napoleon, Marty Napoleon and His Music (Stere-o-Craft, 1958)
