= Boyd Lee Dunlop =

- Born: June 20, 1926; Winston-Salem, North Carolina
- Died: December 27, 2013 (aged 87) Buffalo, New York
- Genres: Jazz
- Instrument: piano
- Years active: 2011–2013

Boyd Lee Dunlop (June 20, 1926 – December 27, 2013) was an American jazz pianist.

== Early life ==
Dunlop was born in Winston-Salem, North Carolina. As a young child, music brought him to Buffalo, New York, and he lived and worked in Buffalo for the rest of his life. His family followed his aunt who had taken a job as a violinist with the Buffalo Philharmonic Orchestra. Dunlop found his first piano outside his house on the corner, discarded with only half the keys working.

Dunlop gave his younger brother, Frankie Dunlop, his first drum lesson. Dunlop recalls, “We used the thin wood from the back of a chair as our sticks.” Younger brother Frankie went on to find fame as a drummer, playing with Thelonious Monk, Duke Ellington, Charles Mingus, Sonny Rollins, Big Jay McNeely, Lionel Hampton, and many other jazz greats, recording nearly one hundred sides during his career.

Dunlop's trajectory followed a different course. Until 2011, he can be found only on one record, a blowsy rhythm and blues session from the late 1950s by Big Jay McNeely. For years Dunlop worked in Buffalo's steel mills and rail yards, yet his calling was the piano, and he played in the clubs around Buffalo, including the Colored Musicians Club, of which he had become a member in 1934.

== Career ==
On December 10, 2011, Dunlop released his debut album, Boyd's Blues produced by photojournalist, Brendan Bannon and music producer, Allen Farmelo. Boyd's Blues includes Dunlop on piano, backed by Sabu Adeyola on bass and Virgil Day on drums. The album debuted as the #1 jazz album on iTunes, and #28 on Billboard's Heatseeker chart.

The Boyd Lee Dunlop Trio held a CD release performance at Hallwalls Contemporary Arts Center on December 10, 2011, to a packed house. as pictured in The Buffalo News.

== Recognition ==
Dunlop was profiled by Dan Barry (Pulitzer Prize-winning reporter) in The New York Times on December 9, 2011, with a short film ("An Unexpected Debut") by Todd Heisler (an Emmy and Pulitzer Prize-winning photographer) and Nick Harbaugh. Dunlop was also profiled by Scott Simon on NPR Weekend Edition on December 10, 2011. Dunlop was also profiled by writer Geoff Kelly for Buffalo, NY's Artvoice.

On October 4, 2012 - Dunlop and his brother Frankie were inducted into the Buffalo Music Hall of fame. Dunlop played a concert that evening in front of fellow inductees past and present. President's Award: The Dunlop Brothers- Piano player Boyd Lee is enjoying a career resurgence after being "rediscovered" in a Buffalo nursing home at age 85. Brother Frankie is an influential jazz drummer who has played with Sonny Rollins, Thelonious Monk, Lionel Hampton, Lena Horne, Charles Mingus and more. He has played on over one hundred albums.

== Death ==
Dunlop died in Buffalo, aged 87.
