= The Hot Canary =

Music for violin & piano

The Hot Canary is a musical composition written for violin and piano by Paul Nero and published in 1948. Ray Gilbert added lyrics in 1949. It was a 1951 hit for violinist Florian ZaBach, selling over a million copies and spending 10 weeks on the Billboard charts, reaching number 13 on The Billboard Best Selling Pop Singles.

The composition has been recorded by many artists, including:

- Paul Weston (1949)
- Joe Venuti (1949)
- Maynard Ferguson (1951)
- Max Pollikoff (1951)
- Percy Faith (1951)
- Ella Fitzgerald (1956)
- Henry Mancini (1963)
