= Florian ZaBach =

American violinist and TV host (1918–2006)

Background information
- Born: August 15, 1918; Chicago, Illinois, U.S.
- Died: February 25, 2006 (aged 87) Scranton, Pennsylvania, U.S.
- Genres: Popular music
- Occupations: Musician; TV host
- Instrument: Violin
- Years active: 1950–1970
- Labels: Decca; Mercury

Florian ZaBach (August 15, 1918 – February 25, 2006) was an American violinist and TV personality.

His recording of "The Hot Canary" sold a million copies and reached the top 15 on the Pop charts in 1951. "Believe It or Not" timed his violin performance of "The Flight of the Bumblebee" and wrote, "he plays 12.8 notes per second ... faster than any known violinist in history". He hosted a television show in 1954 that was aired in cities around the world.

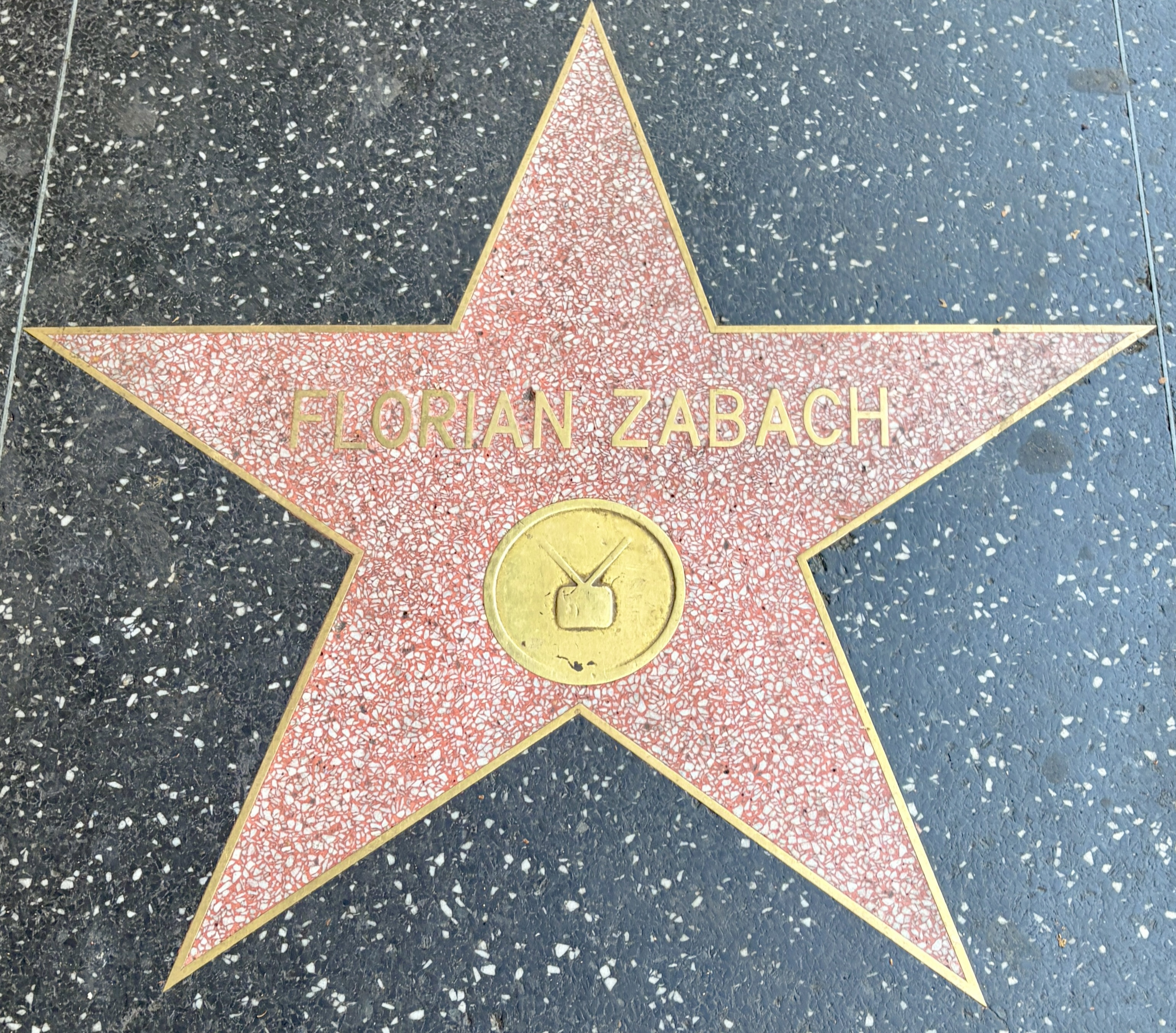
Hollywood Walk of Fame star

In 1960, for his work on television, ZaBach was honored with a star on the Hollywood Walk of Fame at 6505 Hollywood Blvd.

== Biography ==
ZaBach was born in Chicago, the only child of Florian ZaBach Sr., who played clarinet with the Vienna Philharmonic, and Anna Morganfort-ZaBach. He studied music and learned to play the violin with his father at the Chicago Cosmopolitan Conservatory of Music. At the age of 12, he debuted with the Chicago Symphony Orchestra playing the Mendelssohn concerto. He went to the Prague Conservatory in Czechoslovakia to further his violin studies.

When he returned to the United States, he joined the music staff of Chicago's NBC and WGN radio stations. After 2 1/2 years in the Army Medical Corps as a private and a corporal, he resumed his musical career in Washington, D.C. at the Mayflower Hotel. Television's Arthur Godfrey discovered him there, and ZaBach appeared on Godfrey's show several times. He also appeared on most of the television shows emanating from New York at the time: Ed Sullivan, Milton Berle, Ken Murray, Red Skelton, Steve Allen, Jack Paar and 25 appearances on The Tonight Show. For over a year he performed five one-hour shows daily, seven days a week as master of ceremonies, orchestra conductor and violin soloist on the stage of Strand Theatre on Broadway.

ZaBach then moved to Hollywood, where he filmed the "Florian ZaBach" show, a weekly half-hour television series that was syndicated nationwide in more than 90 markets and in major cities throughout the world. He also appeared with major symphony orchestras as soloist and conductor on their pops concerts in the United States and in London, Vienna, Genoa, Venice, Australia and Beijing, among other concert halls.

ZaBach recorded many albums for Mercury and Decca using his 1732 Guarnerius del Gesu violin, created in Cremona, Italy. including million-seller "The Hot Canary" on Decca in 1951 and a minor hit "When The White Lilacs Bloom Again' on Mercury in 1956.

ZaBach spent the later years of his life living and working in Clarks Summit, Pennsylvania. His compositions and musical arrangements were donated to the Florian ZaBach Papers in the Library of Congress in August 2005. He died at Scranton, Pennsylvania on February 25, 2006.

== Discography ==
A partial listing of his recordings follows.

=== Vinyl LPs ===
- Golden Strings
- Hi-Fi Fiddle
- The Hot Canary (1951)
- Hour of Love
- String Along With ZaBach
- Till the End of Time (m) (1958)
- It's Easy to Dance With Florian ZaBach (m) (1959)
- Do It Yourself Wedding Album (June Valli & Florian ZaBach) (1959)
- With the Nashville Country Strings
- Till the End of Time (s) (1959)
- It's Easy to Dance With Florian ZaBach (s) (1960)

=== Vinyl 45s ===
- "April in Portugal"
- "Dream of Romance"
- "Fiddler's Boogie"
- "Jalousie"
- "Oceans of Love"/>
- "Petticoats of Portugal"
- "Pussy Footin'"
- "Runaway Romance"
- "Rainbow Trail"
- "Red Canary"
- "Red Wing"
- "Running off the Rails"
- "Tea for Two"
- "Waltzing Cat"
- "When the White Lilacs Bloom Again" (1956)
- "Whistler and His Dog"

=== Vinyl 78s ===
- Red Canary/April in Portugal
- Fiddler's Boogie
