= In the Land of Hi-Fi with Georgie Auld and His Orchestra =

Studio album by Georgie Auld
- Released: 1955
- Recorded: September 29 and November 7 & 11, 1955
- Studio: Capitol, 5515 Melrose, Hollywood
- Genre: Jazz
- Length: 39:45
- Label: EmArcy; MG 36060

Georgie Auld chronology
In the Land of Hi-Fi with Georgie Auld and His Orchestra (1955)	Dancing in the Land of Hi-Fi (1955)

Professional ratings
Review scores
Source	Rating
Allmusic	4/5 stars

In the Land of Hi-Fi with Georgie Auld and His Orchestra is an album by American jazz saxophonist and bandleader Georgie Auld featuring tracks recorded in 1955 and released on the EmArcy label.

== Reception ==
Allmusic awarded the album 4 stars stating "The music mixes together swing, bop, and cool jazz in winning fashion".

== Track listing ==
1. "In the Land of Hi-Fi" (Auld - May) - 4:15
2. "For You" (Dubin - Burke) - 2:23
3. "Until the Real Thing Comes Along" (Sammy Cahn, Saul Chaplin, L.E. Freeman) - 2:19
4. "Tippin' In" (Leveen - Grever) - 3:06
5. "Sunday Kind of Love" (Barbara Belle, Anita Leonard, Stan Rhodes, Louis Prima) - 2:22
6. "I May Be Wrong" (Henry Sullivan, Harry Ruskin) - 3:53
7. "Swingin' in the Moore Park" (May) - 3:02
8. "If I Loved You" (Richard Rodgers, Oscar Hammerstein II) - 2:46
9. "Dinah" (Harry Akst, Sam M. Lewis, Joe Young) - 2:34
10. "They Can't Take That Away from Me" (George Gershwin, Ira Gershwin) - 2:45
11. "My Blue Heaven" (Walter Donaldson, George A. Whiting) - 2:54
12. "Love Is Just Around the Corner" (Lewis E. Gensler, Leo Robin) - 3:53
- Recorded at Capitol Studios in Los Angeles on September 29 (tracks 8, 10 & 11), November 7 (tracks 1–3 & 9) and November 11 (tracks 5–8), 1955

== Personnel ==
- Georgie Auld - tenor saxophone, bandleader
- Maynard Ferguson, Conrad Gozzo, Mannie Klein, Ray Linn - trumpet
- Tommy Pederson, Frank Rosolino, Si Zentner - trombone
- Skeets Herfurt, Willie Schwartz - alto saxophone
- Ted Nash, Babe Russin - tenor saxophone
- Chuck Gentry - baritone saxophone
- Arnold Ross - piano
- Al Hendrickson, Barney Kessel - guitar
- Joe Mondragon, Joe Comfort - bass
- Alvin Stoller, Irv Kottler - drums
