= A Message from Newport =

Studio album by Maynard Ferguson
- Released: 1958
- Recorded: May 6, 7 & 8, 1958
- Studio: Capitol Studios, New York City
- Genre: Jazz
- Length: 40:00
- Label: Roulette; R 52012
- Producer: Rudy Traylor

Maynard Ferguson chronology
Boy with Lots of Brass (1957)	A Message from Newport (1958)	Swingin' My Way Through College (1958)

A Message from Newport is an album by jazz trumpeter Maynard Ferguson featuring tracks recorded in 1958 and originally released on the Roulette label. The album was recorded in the studio but titled to capitalise on the bands successful appearance at the 1958 Newport Jazz Festival.

== Reception ==
Professional ratings
Review scores
Source	Rating
AllMusic	3/5 stars
The Penguin Guide to Jazz	2.5/4 stars

Leonard Feather reviewed the LP in 1959: "The band's sound is headier and heavier, the playing bolder and colder, than...Basie. The forte is the writing, notably such Slide Hampton originals as The Waltz and the grandiloquent Frame for the Blues. Like Kenton's, the band tends too often toward the triple forte, but the material is varied and substantial enough to compensate--except for The Three Little Foxes, in which the three valve trombonists seem to disagree as to where 'A' is."

In 2015, AllMusic awarded the album 3 stars and its review by Ron Wynn states, "Trumpeter Maynard Ferguson leads his big band in a fiery date recorded in 1958... He was playing no-holds-barred, straight-ahead jazz at this time, and doing it with gusto". The Penguin Guide to Jazz commented that Ferguson's upper-register playing was executed exceptionally well, but suggested that the effect of this soon became boring.

== Track listing ==
All compositions by Slide Hampton except as indicated

1. "The Fugue" - 3:36
2. "Fan It, Janet" (Don Sebesky) - 3:00
3. "The Waltz" - 4:00
4. "Tag Team" (Willie Maiden) - 5:05
5. "And We Listened" (Bob Freedman) - 5:42
6. "Slide's Derangement" - 7:55
7. "Frame for the Blues" - 6:54
8. "Humbug" (Sebesky) - 3:28
9. "Three Little Foxes" - 4:04

== Personnel ==
- Maynard Ferguson - trumpet, valve trombone
- Bill Chase, Clyde Reasinger, Tom Slaney - trumpet
- Slide Hampton, Don Sebesky - trombone
- Jimmy Ford - alto saxophone
- Carmen Leggio, Willie Maiden - tenor saxophone
- Jay Cameron - baritone saxophone
- John Bunch - piano
- Jimmy Rowser -bass
- Jake Hanna - drums
- Bob Freedman, Slide Hampton, Willie Maiden, Don Sebesky - arrangers
