= Maynard Ferguson (album) =

Studio album by Maynard Ferguson
- Released: 1971
- Recorded: 1971
- Genre: Jazz, Big Band
- Length: 37:48
- Label: Columbia
- Producer: Keith Mansfield

Maynard Ferguson chronology
M.F. Horn (1970)	Maynard Ferguson (1971)	M.F. Horn Two (1972)

Maynard Ferguson is a 1971 big band jazz album by Canadian jazz trumpeter Maynard Ferguson. The album was originally released on Columbia Records as Columbia 31117. It was also released in the UK by CBS under the name Alive & Well in London. The album largely consists of arrangements of popular songs of the period along with one original composition.

While he merely "dipped his toes" in the waters of pop music for his first Columbia release (M.F. Horn – Eli's Comin', MacArthur Park), on this album Maynard dives right in. While some albums would contain more "true" jazz than others, this would set the template for most of his tenure at Columbia. Mostly pop covers or popular jazz, with an occasional original (The Serpent on this release) or jazz standard (such as Airegin on 1977's New Vintage).

== Reissues ==
Maynard Ferguson was reissued on CD in 2005 on Wounded Bird 1117.

== Track listing ==
Side one
No.	Title	Writer(s)	Original artist	Length
1.	"Move Over" (arr. Keith Mansfield)	Janis Joplin	Janis Joplin	2:52
2.	"Fire and Rain" (arr. Kenny Wheeler)	James Taylor	James Taylor	3:33
3.	"Aquarius" (arr. Keith Mansfield)	James Rado, Gerome Ragni, Galt MacDermot	Cast of Hair	6:00
4.	"The Serpent"	Keith Mansfield		6:41
Total length:				19:06

Side two
No.	Title	Writer(s)	Original artist	Length
1.	"My Sweet Lord" (arr. Kenny Wheeler)	George Harrison	George Harrison	4:37
2.	"Bridge over Troubled Water" (arr. Keith Mansfield)	Paul Simon	Simon & Garfunkel	4:04
3.	"Your Song" (arr. Kenny Wheeler)	Elton John, Bernie Taupin	Elton John	3:29
4.	"Stoney End" (arr. Adrian Drover)	Laura Nyro	Laura Nyro	3:13
5.	"Living in the Past" (arr. John Cameron)	Ian Anderson	Jethro Tull	3:19
Total length:				18:42

== Personnel ==
- Keith Mansfield: Producer
- Mike Smith: Executive producer
