= Swingin' My Way Through College =

Studio album by Maynard Ferguson
- Released: 1958
- Recorded: December 15, 16 & 17, 1958; Capitol Studios, New York City
- Genre: Jazz
- Label: Roulette; R 25058
- Producer: Teddy Reig

Maynard Ferguson chronology
| A Message from Newport (1958) | Swingin' My Way Through College (1958) | Maynard Ferguson Plays Jazz for Dancing (1959) |

Swingin' My Way Through College (subtitled Maynard Ferguson and His Orchestra Play for Dancing) is an album released by Canadian jazz trumpeter Maynard Ferguson featuring tracks recorded in late 1958 and originally released on the Roulette label.

== Reception ==
Professional ratings
Review scores
| Source | Rating |
|---|---|
| Allmusic | 2/5 stars |

Allmusic awarded the album 2 stars.

== Track listing ==
1. "Don'cha Go 'Way Mad" (Illinois Jacquet, Jimmy Mundy, Al Stillman) - 2:43
2. "That Old Feeling" (Sammy Fain, Lew Brown) - 3:43
3. "What's New?" (Bob Haggart, Johnny Burke) - 3:10
4. "Dancing in the Dark" (Arthur Schwartz, Howard Dietz) - 2:02
5. "Bittersweet" (Willie Maiden) - 3:10
6. "Love Walked In" (George Gershwin, Ira Gershwin) - 3:17
7. "It's a Pity to Say Goodnight" (Billy Reid) - 2:27
8. "B. J.'s Back in Town" (Maiden) - 3:07
9. "Tenderly" (Walter Gross, Jack Lawrence) - 3:38
10. "Bye Bye Blackbird" (Ray Henderson, Mort Dixon) - 2:58
11. "They Can't Take That Away from Me" (George Gershwin, Ira Gershwin) - 3:07

== Personnel ==
- Maynard Ferguson - trumpet, valve trombone
- Bill Chase, Larry Moser, Jerry Tyree - trumpet
- Slide Hampton, Don Sebesky - trombone
- Jimmy Ford - alto saxophone
- Carmen Leggio, Willie Maiden - tenor saxophone
- John Lanni - baritone saxophone
- Bob Dogan - piano
- Jimmy Rowser - bass
- Frankie Dunlop - drums
- Bill Holman, Slide Hampton, Willie Maiden, Don Sebesky - arrangers
