= New Vintage (Maynard Ferguson album) =

Studio album by Maynard Ferguson
- Released: 1977
- Recorded: 1977
- Studio: Mediasound, New York City
- Genre: Jazz, jazz fusion, disco, funk, bop
- Length: 35:14
- Label: Columbia
- Producer: Jay Chattaway; Maynard Ferguson assoc. prod.

Maynard Ferguson chronology
Conquistador (1977)	New Vintage (1977)	Carnival (1978)

Back Cover
- Both covers from Wounded Bird reissue

Singles from New Vintage
- 1. "Main Title (From the 20th Century-Fox Film "Star Wars")" Released: August 1977

New Vintage is the tenth studio album by Canadian jazz trumpeter Maynard Ferguson, released in 1977 on Columbia Records. The title is likely an allusion to new recordings of two 'vintage' titles included in the track list. "Maria" was first recorded on Maynard '62 (it is presented here in a new arrangement), and "Airegin" was first recorded in 1964 for the album Color Him Wild (this new recording features the original Mike Abene arrangement). The front cover plays on this theme, presenting a trumpet in an ice bucket in place of a bottle of champagne, while on the back cover, the cork is seen popping out of the trumpet's bell.

== Background and production ==
After unexpectedly "catching lightning in a bottle" with Conquistador, Columbia and Ferguson were eager to repeat the success. Taking the same basic ingredients of a big theme song ("Star Wars"), a couple of originals, some guest guitar work (this time provided by Steve Khan), a reworking of a classical theme (in the same vein as Primal Scream's "Pagliacci"), a couple of Bobby Militello flute solos, and looking deep into Maynard's book to revive "Airegin", for a high-energy finale, they hoped to re-create that same magic while Conquistador was still on the charts. This was also a return to using the touring band as the core of the album's sound, with only a slightly augmented brass section. The strings and background vocalists were still used to maintain the level of production and polish from the previous 2 albums.

== Critical reception ==
Professional ratings
Review scores
Source	Rating
AllMusic	2/5 stars

Following the same strategy as the previous album, the album's opening track ("Main Title (From the 20th Century-Fox Film Star Wars)") was released as a single, but didn't have nearly the success as Conquistador's "Gonna Fly Now". As with other albums of this period, reviewers were not kind regarding this release, and didn't hesitate to make their contempt known. AllMusic's Matt Collar summed up how many reviewers felt, calling it "Utterly gimmicky and bereft of any actual jazz..."

== Reissues ==
In 2004, New Vintage was reissued by Wounded Bird Records.

== Track listing ==
All compositions arranged and conducted by Jay Chattaway except "Airegin" arranged by Mike Abene.

Side one
No.	Title	Writer(s)	Length
1.	"Main Title (From the 20th Century-Fox Film Star Wars)"	John Williams	4:10
2.	"Oasis"	Jay Chattaway, Maynard Ferguson	6:27
3.	"Maria (From West Side Story)"	Leonard Bernstein, Stephen Sondheim	6:25
Total length:			17:02

Side two
No.	Title	Writer(s)	Length
1.	"El Vuelo (The Flight)"	Chattaway	7:14
2.	"Scheherazade"	Nikolai Rimsky-Korsakov (adapted by Chattaway)	7:00
3.	"Airegin"	Sonny Rollins	3:58
Total length:			18:12

== Personnel ==
Credits adapted from the album cover.

- Maynard Ferguson – Trumpet, Flugelhorn (Trumpet solos on all tracks except "Oasis" on Flugelhorn)

=== The M.F. Band ===
- Mark Colby – Tenor, Soprano Saxophone (Soprano solo on "Oasis", Tenor solo on "El Vuelo (The Flight)")
- Peter Erskine – Drums (Solo on "Airegin" (Note: Erskine's name is misspelled "Urskine" on the album cover for this solo.))
- Biff Hannon – Electric and Acoustic Piano, Micromoog, and Polymoog Synthesizer (Piano solo on "Airegin")
- Roger Homefield – Trombone
- (uncredited) Gordon Johnson – Bass
- Nick Lane – Trombone
- Stan Mark – Trumpet, Flugelhorn
- Mike Migliore – Alto, Soprano Saxophone (Alto solos on "Main Title (From the 20th Century-Fox Film "Star Wars")" and "Airegin")
- Bob Militello – Baritone Saxophone, Flute (Flute solo on "Maria" and "Scheherazade")
- Joe Mosello – Trumpet, Flugelhorn, Congas, Percussion
- Dennis Noday – Trumpet, Flugelhorn
- Randy Purcell – Trombone
- Ron Tooley – Trumpet, Flugelhorn
- Eric Traub – Tenor, Soprano Saxophone
- Tony Romano – Sound and The Tony Rome Show

=== Additional musicians ===
- Ralph MacDonald – Percussion
- Steve Khan – Electric and Acoustic 6 and 12-String Guitars, Classical Guitar (Solos on "Main Title (From the 20th Century-Fox Film "Star Wars")" and "Scheherazade")
- David Taylor – Trombone
- Donald Corrado – French Horn
- Jim Buffington – French Horn
- Brooks Tillotson – French Horn
- Earl Chapin – French Horn

=== Strings ===
- Gloria Agostini (Harp)
- Jonathan Aloramowitz
- Lamar Alsop
- Seymour Barab
- Arnold Black
- Alfred Brown
- Frederick Buldrini
- Harold Coletta
- Harry Cykman
- Richard Davis
- Max Ellen
- Lewis Ely
- Barry Finclair
- Louis Gabowitz
- Harry Glickman
- Theodore Israel
- Harold Kohon
- Charles Libove
- Charles McCracken
- Marvin Morgenstern
- David Nadien
- Tony Posk
- Matthew Raimondi
- Alan Shulman
- Herbert Sorkin
- Richard Sortomme
- Emanuel Vardi

=== Vocalists ===
- Richard Berg
- Ellen Benfield
- Katie Irving
- Tina Kaplan
- Tony Wells

=== Production ===
- Produced by Jay Chattaway
- Associate producer: Maynard Ferguson
- Recorded and mixed by Bob Clearmountain at Mediasound Studios, New York City, except "Airegin", which was recorded and mixed by Don Puluse (Note: Puluse is misspelled "Paluse" on the album cover.) at CBS Recording Studios, N.Y.C.
- Master Engineering: Vlado Mellor
- Cover concept, sleeve design: Reed Rankin
- Album design: Robert Biro
- Photography: Ulf Skogsbergh
- Lettering: Frank Conley
- Additional photography: Gary Adcock, Bobby Bank, Mary Scibetta, Gordon Johnson, Kim Ferguson, Tom Copi
