= Trumpet Rhapsody =

Studio album by Maynard Ferguson
- Released: 1968
- Recorded: December 1967; Baden-Baden, West Germany
- Genre: Jazz
- Label: MPS; MPS 15 166 ST

Maynard Ferguson chronology
| Ridin' High (1966) | Trumpet Rhapsody (1968) | The Ballad Style of Maynard Ferguson (1969) |

Trumpet Rhapsody (also released as Maynard Ferguson '69) is an album released by Canadian jazz trumpeter Maynard Ferguson featuring tracks recorded in 1967 and originally released on the MPS label.

== Reception ==
Professional ratings
Review scores
| Source | Rating |
|---|---|
| AllMusic | 2/5 stars |

AllMusic states "the great trumpeter sticks mostly to ballads, showcasing his tone and sometimes his range with restraint and an accent on lyricism. The music is enjoyable enough but not too essential".

== Track listing ==
1. "Almost Like Being in Love" (Frederick Loewe, Alan Jay Lerner) - 1:50
2. "Knarf" (Mike Abene) - 4:30
3. "Olé" (Maynard Ferguson, Slide Hampton) - 7:05
4. "Dancing Nitely" (Bill Holman) - 5:05
5. "Tenderly" (Walter Gross, Jack Lawrence) - 3:05
6. "Whisper Not" (Benny Golson) - 6:20
7. "Got the Spirit" (Hampton) - 9:25

== Personnel ==
- Maynard Ferguson - trumpet
- Rolf Schneebiegl - trumpet, flugelhorn
- Siegfried Achhammer, Klaus Mitschele, Karl Sauter - trumpet
- Heinz Hermannsdorfer, George Hohne, Gerhard Lachmann - trombone
- Werner Betz - bass trombone
- Werner Baumgart, Bernd Fischer - alto saxophone, clarinet
- Bert Huseman - tenor saxophone, flute
- Rudi Flierl - tenor saxophone, bass clarinet
- Johnny Feigel - bass clarinet
- Dieter Reith - piano
- Jurgen Franke - guitar
- Werner Schulze - bass
- Herman Mutschler - drums
- Rolf-Hans Mueller - conductor
