= Boy with Lots of Brass =

1957 studio album by Maynard Ferguson, Irene Kral

Studio album by Maynard Ferguson
- Released: July 1957
- Recorded: 1957
- Genre: Jazz
- Length: 36:10
- Label: EmArcy; MG 36114

Maynard Ferguson chronology
Around the Horn with Maynard Ferguson (1955)	Boy with Lots of Brass (1957)	A Message from Newport (1958)

Boy with Lots of Brass is a 1957 album by Canadian jazz trumpeter Maynard Ferguson featuring singer Irene Kral.

== Reception ==
Professional ratings
Review scores
Source	Rating
Allmusic	3/5 stars
The Penguin Guide to Jazz Recordings	3/4 stars

Allmusic awarded the album three stars with reviewer Scott Yanow stating that the arrangements "show off the talented orchestra and its memorable leader quite well."

== Track listing ==
1. "Give Me the Simple Life" (Rube Bloom, Harry Ruby) – 2:34
2. "My Funny Valentine" (Lorenz Hart, Richard Rodgers) – 4:00
3. "The Lamp Is Low" (Peter DeRose, Bert Shefter) – 3:24
4. "Imagination" (Jimmy Van Heusen) – 3:55
5. "The Song Is You" (Jerome Kern, Oscar Hammerstein II) – 2:10
6. "Jeepers Creepers" (Harry Warren, Johnny Mercer) – 2:32
7. "Love Me or Leave Me" (Walter Donaldson, Gus Kahn) – 2:44
8. "A Foggy Day" (George Gershwin, Ira Gershwin) – 3:02
9. "Easy to Love" (Cole Porter) – 3:10
10. "Moonlight in Vermont" (John Blackburn, Karl Suessdorf) – 3:49
11. "I Hadn't Anyone Till You" (Ray Noble) – 1:42
12. "I Never Knew" (Ted Fio Rito, Kahn) – 3:08

== Personnel ==
- Maynard Ferguson – trumpet, valve trombone
- Willie Maiden – arranger, tenor saxophone
- Al Cohn – arranger
- Bill Holman
- Ernie Wilkins
- Irene Kral – vocals
- Anthony Ortega – alto saxophone
- Tate Houston – baritone saxophone
- Jimmy Cleveland – trombone
- Jimmy Knepper – trombone
- John Bello – trumpet
- Joe Burnett
- Bobby Timmons – piano
- Richard Evans – bass
- Larry Bunker – drums
- Jordi Pujol – reissue producer
