= Ridin' High (Maynard Ferguson album) =

Studio album by Maynard Ferguson
- Released: 1968
- Recorded: 1967
- Genre: Jazz
- Length: 36:06
- Label: Enterprise; S 13-101
- Producer: Alvertis Isbell

Maynard Ferguson chronology
The Maynard Ferguson Sextet (1965)	Ridin' High (1968)	Trumpet Rhapsody (1968)

Ridin' High (also released as Freaky) is an album released by Canadian jazz trumpeter Maynard Ferguson featuring tracks recorded in 1967 and originally released on the Enterprise label.

Professional ratings
Review scores
Source	Rating
AllMusic	4/5 stars

== Track listing ==
1. "The Rise and Fall of Seven" (Tom McIntosh) - 5:51
2. "Light Green" (Don Piestrup) - 3:38
3. "Kundalini Woman" (Slide Hampton) - 5:21
4. "Sunny" (Bobby Hebb) - 3:48
5. "Meet a Cheetah" (Don Sebesky) - 4:25
6. "Molecules" (Slide Hampton) - 4:34
7. "Wack-Wack" (Donald Storball, Eldee Young, Hysear Don Walker, Isaac Red Holt) - 2:46
8. "Satan Speaks" (Tom McIntosh) - 2:30
9. "Alfie" (Burt Bacharach, Hal David) - 3:00

== Personnel ==
- Maynard Ferguson - trumpet, flugelhorn
- Charles Camilleri, Dick Hurwitz, Nat Pavone, Lew Soloff - trumpet
- Jimmy Cleveland, Slide Hampton - trombone
- George Jeffers - bass trombone, tuba
- Dick Spencer - alto saxophone, soprano saxophone
- Lew Tabackin, Frank Vicari - tenor saxophone
- Pepper Adams - baritone saxophone
- Danny Bank - bass saxophone, piccolo
- Mike Abene - piano
- Joe Beck - guitar
- Don Payne - bass
- Don McDonald - drums
- John Pacheco - congas
