= Around the Horn with Maynard Ferguson =

Studio album by Maynard Ferguson
- Released: 1956
- Recorded: November 7 & 10, 1955 and May 7 & 12, 1956
- Studio: Capitol, Melrose Ave (Hollywood)
- Genre: Jazz
- Label: EmArcy; MG 36076

Maynard Ferguson chronology
Maynard Ferguson Octet (1955)	Around the Horn with Maynard Ferguson (1956)	Boy with Lots of Brass (1957)

Around the Horn with Maynard Ferguson is an album led by Canadian jazz trumpeter Maynard Ferguson featuring tracks recorded in 1955 and 1956 and released on the EmArcy label.

== Reception ==
Professional ratings
Review scores
Source	Rating
AllMusic	4/5 stars
Disc	4/5 stars

AllMusic awarded the album 4 stars and its review by Scott Yanow states, "Ferguson gets to show off his versatility (including playing some credible blues) and takes a spot-on bass trumpet on "Mrs. Pitlack Regrets."

== Track listing ==
All compositions by Bill Holman

1. "Mrs. Pitlack Regrets" - 3:11
2. "Never You Mind" - 3:28
3. "Pork Pie" - 3:27
4. "Dream Boat" - 2:51
5. "Well, Hardly Ever" - 3:26
6. "The Roamin' Showman" - 3:05
7. "Dancing Nitely" - 3:11
8. "Ain't Life Grand" - 3:11
9. "Idyll" - 3:17
10. "Open Sesame" - 3:08
11. "C'est La Blues" - 3:57
12. "Wildman" - 3:12
- Recorded at Capitol Studios in Los Angeles, CA on November 7, 1955 (tracks 6 & 10–12), November 10, 1955 (tracks 5 & 7–9), May 7, 1956 (tracks 1, 2 & 4) and May 12, 1956 (track 3)

== Personnel ==
- Maynard Ferguson - trumpet, bass trumpet, valve trombone
- Buddy Childers, Ray Linn - trumpet
- Bob Burgess - trombone
- Herb Geller - alto saxophone
- Georgie Auld, Bill Holman - tenor saxophone
- Bud Shank - baritone saxophone
- Lorraine Geller - piano
- Buddy Clark (tracks 1–4), Ray Brown (tracks 5–12) - bass
- Al Stoller - drums
