= Jay Chattaway =

American composer

- Born: July 8, 1946 (age 80); Monongahela, Pennsylvania, U.S.
- Education: West Virginia University
- Genre: Film score
- Occupation: Composer
- Spouse: Terri Potts-Chattaway

Jay Chattaway (born July 8, 1946) is an American composer of film and television scores. He composed music for several Star Trek television series: Star Trek: The Next Generation, Star Trek: Deep Space Nine, Star Trek: Voyager, and Star Trek: Enterprise.

== Early life ==
Chattaway was born in Monongahela, Pennsylvania and studied music at West Virginia University (WVU).

== College career ==
At WVU, Chattaway was also a member of many student organizations, including the Mountaineer Marching Band, Lambda Chi Alpha social fraternity, Kappa Kappa Psi honorary band service fraternity, and Phi Mu Alpha Sinfonia men's music social fraternity.

He was initiated into the Omicron chapter of Kappa Kappa Psi at WVU on December 6, 1965, and is currently an alumnus brother of the fraternity. His initiation into the Epsilon Sigma chapter of Phi Mu Alpha took place on March 1, 1965.

He became a regular member of a rhythm and blues band called the "Abductors" in which he played trumpet, wrote the musical scores, and was musical director.

== Music career ==
Chattaway was drafted into the military while working on his graduate degree and joined the Navy Band, serving as the unit's chief arranger and composer. After his discharge from the Navy, Chattaway moved to New York City to write music. He later moved to Los Angeles to compose for film.

Chattaway is also well known as an arranger of big band charts for the Maynard Ferguson Orchestra during the 1970s, and also composed or co-composed some of Ferguson's hits, including "Conquistador", "Superbone Meets the Bad Man", and "Primal Scream". Years before his association with the Star Trek franchise, Chattaway also arranged and produced a 1979 version of the theme from Star Trek by Jerry Goldsmith.

Chattaway's film scores include Maniac (1980), Vigilante (1983), The Big Score (1983), The Last Fight (1983), The Rosebud Beach Hotel (1984), Missing in Action (1984), Invasion U.S.A. (1985), Silver Bullet (1985), Walking the Edge (1985), Braddock: Missing in Action III (1988), Maniac Cop (1988), Red Scorpion (1988), Relentless (1989), Far Out Man (1990), Maniac Cop 2 (1990), The Ambulance (1990) and Rich Girl (1991).

Chattaway's original concert band compositions include Parade of the Tall Ships (concert march), Mazama (Legend of the Pacific Northwest), Sailabration, and Windsong.

In 2001, he won an Emmy for Outstanding Music for a Series for the final episode of Star Trek: Voyager.

== Personal life ==
Chattaway is married to former Star Trek producer Terri Potts-Chattaway.
