= M.F. Horn Two =

Studio album by Maynard Ferguson
- Released: January 1972
- Recorded: 1971
- Genre: Jazz, big band
- Length: 41:47
- Label: Columbia
- Producer: Keith Mansfield

Maynard Ferguson chronology
Maynard Ferguson (1971)	M.F. Horn Two (1972)	M.F. Horn 3 (1973)

M.F. Horn Two is a 1972 big band jazz album by Canadian jazz trumpeter Maynard Ferguson. It features cover versions of many songs that were popular in the years leading up to its production, including: "Theme from Shaft" by Isaac Hayes, "Country Road" by James Taylor, "Mother" by John Lennon, "Spinning Wheel" by David Clayton-Thomas and "Hey Jude" by The Beatles. It also features a track called "Free Wheeler" written by another highly regarded jazz trumpeter and flugelhorn player, Kenny Wheeler.

== Reviews ==
Professional ratings
Review scores
Source	Rating
AllMusic	2/5 stars

Scott Yanow wrote, "His trumpet playing is frequently brilliant throughout this LP with his English orchestra but not too many jazz purists will be thrilled by his renditions of (popular songs)…"

== Reissues ==
M.F. Horn Two was reissued on CD in 2007 on Wounded Bird 3170.

== Track listing ==
Side one
No.	Title	Writer(s)	Original artist	Length
1.	"Give It One" (arr. Alan Downey)	Alan Downey/Maynard Ferguson		3:30
2.	"Country Road" (arr. Keith Mansfield)	James Taylor	James Taylor	4:39
3.	"Theme from "Shaft"" (arr. Mansfield)	Isaac Hayes	Isaac Hayes	4:56
4.	"Theme from "Summer of `42"" (arr. Kenny Wheeler)	Michel Legrand	Michel Legrand	4:05
Total length:				17:10

Side two
No.	Title	Writer(s)	Original artist	Length
1.	"Mother" (arr. Mansfield)	John Lennon	John Lennon	5:46
2.	"Spinning Wheel" (arr. Adrian Drover)	David Clayton-Thomas	Blood, Sweat & Tears	4:24
3.	"Free Wheeler" (arr. Wheeler)	Kenny Wheeler		6:56
4.	"Hey Jude" (arr. Drover)	John Lennon/Paul McCartney	The Beatles	7:31
Total length:				24:37

== Musicians ==
- Maynard Ferguson: Leader, trumpet, flugelhorn, valve trombone
- Trumpets: John Donnelly, Martin Drover, Alan Downey, Mike Bailey, Bud Parks
- Trombones: Billy Graham, Adrian Drover, Norman Fripp, Derek Wadsworth
- Saxes: Jeff Daly, Brian Smith, Bob Sydor, Bob Watson, Stan Robinson
- Drums: Randy Jones
- Bass/Bass Guitar: Dave Lynane
- Piano/Electric Piano: Pete Jackson
- Percussion: Ray Cooper, Harold Fisher

== Production ==
- Keith Mansfield –Producer
- Mike Smith –Executive producer
- Adrian Kerridge–Recording Engineer
- Mike Ross/David Baker/Adrian Kerridge –Re-Mix Engineers
- Karenlee Grant/John Berg –Cover Design
- Bob Monroe –Photo interpretations
- Ernie Garside –Sleeve notes, contracting-co-ordination
- Recorded at Landsdowne Studios, London
