= Max Pollikoff =

American violinist (1904–1984)

Max Pollikoff (1904 - 1984) was an American classical music violinist who created the Music in Our Time Series at the 92nd Street Y in New York City. The Series commissioned and premiered hundreds of new works. In 1923, when Pollikoff was 19, he made his first appearance in New York, playing at the Aeolian Hall. He won critical praise as "a violinist of considerable interest and promise." He played works by Bach, Bruch, Sarasate, Chopin and his own Legende. In 1972 the American Music Center awarded his a Letter of Distinction.

Pollikoff was born in Newark, New Jersey. From 15 to 19, the McDowell Club had sponsored his studies in Europe and New York.
