= M.F. Horn =

Studio album by Maynard Ferguson
- Released: 1970
- Recorded: 1970
- Genres: Jazz, Big band
- Length: 45:04
- Label: Columbia
- Producer: Keith Mansfield

Maynard Ferguson chronology
The Ballad Style of Maynard Ferguson (1969)	M.F. Horn (1970)	Maynard Ferguson (1971)

Alternate cover

The World of Maynard Ferguson

M.F. Horn is Maynard Ferguson's second album on Columbia Records, and the first of his highly successful "M.F. Horn" series of albums. It was also released in Europe as The World of Maynard Ferguson (but with the sides reversed) — not to be confused with the Roulette compilation with the same title. His first record for CBS (The Ballad Style of Maynard Ferguson) was filled with easy listening/pop recordings, but this would be Maynard's first foray into the world of rock music. His recording of "MacArthur Park" would prove very popular with his fans, and would be a concert staple for many years.

== Reissues ==
In 2005, M.F. Horn was reissued by Wounded Bird Records.

== Track listing ==
Side one
No.	Title	Writer(s)	Length
1.	"Eli's Comin'" (arranged by Adrian Drover)	Laura Nyro	5:20
2.	"Ballad to Max" (arranged by Kenny Wheeler)	Kenny Wheeler	5:25
3.	"MacArthur Park" (arranged by Drover)	Jimmy Webb	9:58
Total length:			20:43

Side two
No.	Title	Writer(s)	Length
1.	"Chala Nata" (arranged by Keith Mansfield)	Keith Mansfield	7:50
2.	"If I Thought You'd Ever Change Your Mind" (arranged by Mansfield)	John Cameron	4:13
3.	"L-Dopa" (arranged by Mansfield)	Mansfield	12:18
Total length:			24:21

== Personnel ==
=== Musicians ===
- Maynard Ferguson: Trumpet, Flugelhorn, Valve trombone
- Trumpets: Alan Downey, Martin Drover, John Huckdridge, John Donnelly
- Trombones: Billy Graham, Chris Pyne, Albert Wood
- Alto Saxophone: Pete King
- Tenor Saxophone: Danny Moss, Brian Smith
- Baritone Saxophone: Bob Watson
- Piano: Pete Jackson
- Bass, Bass guitar: Dave Lynane
- Drums: Randy Jones
- Guitar: George Kish
- Conga Drums: Frank Ricotti
- Veena: Vemu Mukunda
- Tamboori: Mohana Lakshmipathy

=== Production ===
- Producer: Keith Mansfield
- Recording Engineers: Adrian Kerridge, John Mackswith
