= Chameleon (Maynard Ferguson album) =

Studio album by Maynard Ferguson
- Released: 1974
- Recorded: April 1–4, 1974
- Genre: Jazz
- Length: 40:16
- Label: Columbia
- Producer: Teo Macero

Maynard Ferguson chronology
M.F. Horn 4&5: Live At Jimmy's (1974)	Chameleon (1974)	Primal Scream (1976)

Chameleon is a 1974 big band jazz album by Canadian jazz trumpeter Maynard Ferguson. It features cover versions of many songs that were popular in the years leading up to its production, including: "Jet" by Paul McCartney and Wings, "The Way We Were" – which was popularized by Barbra Streisand, and "Livin' for the City" by Stevie Wonder. He also pays tribute to trumpeter Bunny Berigan with his own take on "I Can't Get Started".

== Reviews ==
Professional ratings
Review scores
Source	Rating
AllMusic	2.5/5 stars
The Penguin Guide to Jazz Recordings	2.5/4 stars
DownBeat	5/5 stars

Writing for the All Music Guide to Jazz, Scott Yanow said of the album that "His version of Herbie Hancock's "Chameleon" is enjoyable, and he does a good job on Chick Corea's "La Fiesta".

== Reissues ==
Chameleon was reissued on CD by Sony on July 1, 2003 in the U.S. with the album "Conquistador" paired with it as a double re-release and contains remastered sound as well as an extended essay within the 12-page liner booklet.

== Track listing ==
Side one
No.	Title	Writer(s)	Length
1.	"Chameleon"	Paul Jackson, Harvey Mason, Bennie Maupin, Herbie Hancock	4:35
2.	"Gospel John"	Jeffrey Steinberg	6:02
3.	"The Way We Were"	Marvin Hamlisch, Alan Bergman, Marilyn Bergman	3:25
4.	"Jet"	Paul McCartney	3:55

Side two
No.	Title	Writer(s)	Length
1.	"La Fiesta"	Chick Corea	8:04
2.	"I Can't Get Started" (vocals by Maynard Ferguson)	Ira Gershwin, Vernon Duke	3:42
3.	"Livin' for the City"	Stevie Wonder	4:55
4.	"Superbone Meets the Bad Man"	Jay Chattaway	5:08

== Musicians ==
- Maynard Ferguson – Leader, trumpet, baritone horn, superbone and vocal.
- Stan Mark, Dennis Noday, Lynn Nicholson, Bob Summers – trumpets, flugelhorn, Latin American instruments
- Randy Purcell, Jerry Johnson – trombones
- Andy Mackintosh – alto sax, flute, soprano, cowbell
- Brian Smith – tenor sax, flute, tambourine
- Bruce Johnstone – baritone sax, flute, vibraslap
- Rick Petrone – bass
- Allan Zavod – piano, electric piano
- Dan D'Imperio - drums
- Joe Beck - guitar
- Jerry Johnson - trombone, played all bass trombone parts using "false-pedaltones" on a 2B, arranged La Fiesta

== Production ==
- Teo Macero –Producer
- Stan Tonkel –Recording Engineer
- John Guerriere, Tim Geelan –Re-Mix Engineers
- Jack Ashkinazy –Mastering Engineer
- Karenlee Grant –Cover Design
- Frank Laffitte –Cover photographs
- Ernie Garside –Sleeve notes, contracting-co-ordination
