= Conquistador (Maynard Ferguson album) =

Studio album by Maynard Ferguson
- Released: March 1977
- Recorded: October–December 1976
- Studios: Mediasound (New York City); CBS (San Francisco); Wally Heider (San Francisco)
- Genres: Jazz, jazz fusion, funk, big band
- Length: 35:43
- Label: Columbia
- Producer: Jay Chattaway

Maynard Ferguson chronology
Primal Scream (1976)	Conquistador (1977)	New Vintage (1977)

Singles from Conquistador
- 1. "Gonna Fly Now (Theme from "Rocky")" Released: 1977

Conquistador is the ninth album by Canadian jazz trumpeter Maynard Ferguson on Columbia Records. The album is notable for its inclusion of the hit single "Gonna Fly Now (Theme from "Rocky")".

== Background and production ==
"Bob James produced it (Primal Scream) and made it with all the New York heavies Harvey Mason, Steve Gadd, Richard Tee, Eric Gale, et al). It did very well for a crossover album, but the guys on the band were a little upset about the fact that they weren't on it."

— Mark Colby describing the recording of Primal Scream and its aftermath.

After the experience of creating Primal Scream without his touring band, Ferguson was determined to see them become an integral part of his next effort. While Bob James was firmly in control of the production, Ferguson was insistent that his band members would be a part of the proceedings. It became a bi-coastal effort, with the touring band recording in San Francisco between dates, and the James crew recording in New York. Two of the songs were recorded entirely in New York without any participation by Ferguson's band: the themes from Star Trek and Rocky.

== "Gonna Fly Now" ==
"I knew it was going to be a hit. Sylvester Stallone was in the studio when we recorded it. If you listen very close to the original recording, you can hear in the mix the sound of him hitting the small bag."

— Maynard Ferguson describing Sylvester Stallone punching a speed bag to the rhythm of the song as it was recorded.

While Ferguson was known to have an uncanny ability to change with the times, no one suspected that in the Spring of 1977, he would pull off the coup of his life. As AllMusic reviewer Richard Ginell put it: "Maynard was shrewd, and Maynard was quick, and he managed to beat almost everyone to the punch..."

It had been decades since a big band recording had made the charts, but when he released his recording ahead of the soundtrack version, Ferguson scored the biggest hit of his long career. The recording had a 13-week run on Billboard's Hot 100 chart, eventually peaking at number 28 on June 25. It's likely that Ferguson's recording paved the way for the success of the soundtrack version (Bill Conti's own recording would peak at number one the following week). Gonna Fly Now is also unique in that it had recordings by four different artists charting at the same time (Ferguson, Conti, Rhythm Heritage and Current).

== Critical reception ==
Professional ratings
Review scores
Source	Rating
AllMusic	3/5 stars
The Penguin Guide to Jazz Recordings	3/4 stars
DownBeat	2.5/5 stars

Conquistador was the most successful album of Ferguson's career, earning him his first and only gold record, and a Grammy nomination (Best Pop Instrumental Performance) for "Gonna Fly Now (Theme from "Rocky")". Boosted by the popularity of the single, Conquistador not only went to number one on the Jazz charts, but it became the first big band album to appear on the pop charts in decades, sparking a revival of interest in big band music.

When Conquistador rose to number 22 on the pop album charts, noted Los Angeles Times music critic Leonard Feather noted "Conquistador earned Ferguson a unique place in the big band world: he alone was able to crack the pop charts."

== Reissues ==
In 2003, Conquistador was reissued by Columbia/Legacy along with 1974's Chameleon, both with remastered sound and new essays.

== Trivia ==
Maynard Ferguson's arrangement of "Gonna Fly Now" was used for the opening of the Toronto newscast CityPulse from the early 1980s into the 1990s (with newer arrangements keeping the same melody used until the mid 2000s). Television stations in the United States also used it for their news programming, including WAAY-TV in Huntsville, Alabama; WCMH-TV in Columbus, Ohio; WMT-TV in Cedar Rapids, Iowa (now KGAN); and WRET-TV in Charlotte, North Carolina (now WCNC-TV).

Maynard Ferguson's arrangement of "Theme from Star Trek" was used as the opening for The Larry King Show talk radio program on the Mutual Radio Network, focusing on the recording improvisations rather than the main melody, although the piece in full could be heard on occasion at the close of his program. Jay Chattaway, who produced the album and worked on most of the arrangements on the album, would go on to compose music scores for Star Trek: The Next Generation and its respected spinoffs; Deep Space Nine and Voyager, along with the prequel Enterprise.

== Track listing ==
All songs arranged and conducted by Jay Chattaway except Soar Like an Eagle by Bob James. All trumpet solos by Maynard Ferguson except where noted.

Side one
No.	Title	Writer(s)	Length
1.	"Gonna Fly Now (Theme from "Rocky")" (Guitar solo – Jeff Layton)	Bill Conti, Carol Connors, Ayn Robbins	4:22
2.	"Mister Mellow" (Guitar solo – George Benson)	Jay Chattaway, Maynard Ferguson	6:27
3.	"Theme from Star Trek" (Flute solo – Bobby Militello)	Alexander Courage, Gene Roddenberry	6:17
Total length:			17:06

Side two
No.	Title	Writer(s)	Length
1.	"Conquistador" (Tenor sax solo – Mark Colby; Trumpet calls – Stan Mark, Dennis Noday, Joe Mosello, Ron Tooley)	Chattaway, Ferguson	7:34
2.	"Soar Like an Eagle" (Piano solo – Bob James; Tenor sax solo – Mark Colby)	Bob James	6:33
3.	"The Fly" (Soprano sax solo – Mike Migliore)	Chattaway, Ferguson	4:30
Total length:			18:37

- Times shown are the correct original LP lengths. (Note: Times for virtually all tracks on vinyl are incorrect. Most errors involve times for side one tracks being displayed on side two, and vice versa. Even singles used the erroneous times shown on the LPs.)

== Personnel ==
=== The MF Band ===
- Alto & Soprano saxophone: Mike Migliore
- Tenor & Soprano Saxophone: Mark Colby
- Baritone saxophone & Flute: Bobby Militello
- Trumpets: Stan Mark, Dennis Noday, Joe Mosello (credited as Guiseppe [sic] Loon P. Mosello (Note: This misspelling of "Giuseppe" appears on all releases of this album, so it is included in this form here.)), Ron Tooley
- Trombones: Randy Purcell, Roger Homefield
- Drums: Peter Erskine
- Bass: Gordon Johnson
- Keyboards: Biff Hannon
- Sound: Tony Romano

=== Guest musicians ===
- Guitar: George Benson
- Keyboards: Bob James

=== Additional players ===
- Guitars: George Benson, Jeff Layton, Eric Gale, Lance Quinn
- Keyboards: Kenny Ascher
- Bass: Gary King, Will Lee
- Drums: Harvey Mason, Allan Schwartzberg
- Percussion: Ralph MacDonald
- Parade Drum: Phil Kraus
- Alto Saxophone: George Young
- Tenor Saxophone: Joe Farrell
- Trumpet: Jon Faddis, Marvin Stamm, Randy Brecker, Alan Rubin, Bernie Glow, Marky Markowitz, Jim Bossy
- Trombone: Wayne Andre, Paul Faulise, Dave Taylor, Julian Preister
- French Horn: Brooks Tillotson, Donald Corrado
- Vocals: Patti Austin, Lani Groves, Gwen Guthrie, Linda November, Ellen Bernfield, Vivian Cherry, Richard Berg, Martin Nelson
- Strings: Alfred Brown, Harry Cykman, Max Ellen, Paul Gershman, Harold Kohon, Charles Libove, Harry Lookofsky, Charles McCracken, Marvin Morgenstern, David Nadien, Eugene Noye, Max Pollikoff, Matthew Raimondi, Albert Scheonmaker, Alan Shulman, Richard Sortomme, Emanuel Vardi

=== Production ===
- Producer: Jay Chattaway
- Executive Producer: Bob James
- Engineer: Joe Jorgensen
- Mastering Engineer: Vladimir Meller
- Cover Painting: John Collier
- Design: Paula Scher
- Photography: Tom Copi
- Art Direction: Howard Fritzson

=== Reissue ===
- Producer: Bob Belden
- Mastering Engineer: Mark Wilder, Seth Foster
- Legacy A&R: Steve Berkowitz
- Project Director: Seth Rothstein
- Photography: Don Hunstein
- Reissue Design: Randall Martin
- Packaging Manager: John Christiana
