= M.F. Horn 3 =

Studio album by Maynard Ferguson
- Released: 1973
- Recorded: 1973
- Genre: Jazz
- Length: 38:22
- Label: Columbia
- Producer: Mike Smith, Teo Macero

Maynard Ferguson chronology
M.F. Horn Two (1972)	M.F. Horn 3 (1973)	M.F. Horn 4&5: Live At Jimmy's (1974)

M.F. Horn 3 (stylized M.F. Horn|3) is an album by Canadian jazz trumpeter Maynard Ferguson. After Ferguson moved from England to the U.S. in 1973, his band changed, as British members were replaced by American musicians, primarily from colleges. The album was produced by Mike Smith and Teo Macero.

== Critical reception ==
Professional ratings
Review scores
Source	Rating
AllMusic	4/5 stars

The third installment in the "M.F. Horn" series features some of Ferguson's first experiments with funk in a big band setting, which excited some and confused others. As one reviewer said, "the music on this album is an exciting reminder of just how diverse the music scene really was during the early to mid-'70s, even if pigeonholers didn't yet have a controllable category for some of the sounds that were in the air at that time."

== Reissues ==
In 2007, M.F. Horn 3 was reissued by Wounded Bird Records.

== Track listing ==
Side one
No.	Title	Writer(s)	Length
1.	"Awright, Awright"	Pete Jackson	7:22
2.	"Round Midnight"	Thelonious Monk, Cootie Williams, Bernie Hanighen	4:48
3.	"Nice 'n Juicy"	Jeffrey Steinberg	7:10
Total length:			19:20

Side two
No.	Title	Writer(s)	Length
1.	"Pocahontas"	Alan Downey, Maynard Ferguson	6:01
2.	"Love Theme from "The Valachi Papers""	Riz Ortolani	4:42
3.	"Mother Fingers"	Pete Jackson	3:19
4.	"S.O.M.F."	Pete Jackson	5:00
Total length:			19:02

== Personnel ==
- Maynard Ferguson – trumpet, flugelhorn, superbone
- Mike Davis – trumpet, flugelhorn
- Alan Downey – trumpet, flugelhorn
- Tony Mabbett – trumpet, flugelhorn
- Terry Noonan – trumpet, flugelhorn
- Adrian Drover – trombone
- Billy Graham – trombone
- Geoff Wright – trombone
- Andy MacIntosh – alto saxophone
- Tony Buchanan – tenor saxophone
- Bruce Johnstone – baritone saxophone
- Pete Jackson – piano
- Dave Markee – bass guitar
- Randy Jones – drums
- Ray Cooper – percussion
- Vimu Macunda – veena
