= Carnival (Maynard Ferguson album) =

Studio album by Maynard Ferguson
- Released: 1978
- Genre: Jazz, jazz fusion, funk, big band
- Length: 45:34
- Label: Columbia
- Producer: Maynard Ferguson

Maynard Ferguson chronology
New Vintage (1977)	Carnival (1978)	Hot (1979)

Singles from Carnival
- 1. "Theme from "Battlestar Galactica"" Released: 1978

Carnival is the 11th album by Canadian jazz trumpeter Maynard Ferguson on Columbia Records. After the success of Conquistador, this album follows in a similar structure. Another big theme song ("Battlestar Galactica"), a couple of originals, a blast from the past ("Stella by Starlight"), and a cover of "Birdland", which was well received.

== Background and production ==
In preparing for this album, Maynard proved once again just how keenly aware he was of what was going on in the world of music ("Fantasy" and "Baker Street" had become hits mere months before entering the studio, and "Birdland" was still growing in popularity after its debut the year before), but he was having trouble converting these sensibilities into chart success. Having taken over the reins as producer, he hedged his bets by including a couple of songs from his past, re-recording the Slide Hampton arrangement of "Stella by Starlight" (originally on his 1959 release "A Message from Birdland", which featured Joe Zawinul in one of his earliest US appearances), and a new arrangement of "Over the Rainbow" (the original was recorded for the 1956 release "Dimensions", after recording it as part of Charlie Barnet's band years before).

== Critical reception ==
AllMusic's Scott Yanow wrote "Maynard Ferguson's version of "Birdland" from this LP was a bit of a hit and he fares fairly well on "Stella by Starlight" and "Over the Rainbow," but overall this typically commercial Columbia album is of lesser interest."

Professional ratings
Review scores
Source	Rating
AllMusic	2/5 stars

== Reissues ==
In 2003, Carnival was reissued by Wounded Bird Records.

== Track listing ==
- Maynard Ferguson: Trumpet solos on all tracks except "Baker Street" (Flugelhorn)

Side one
No.	Title	Writer(s)	Length
1.	"M. F. Carnival" (Arranged by Nick Lane, Guitar Solo: John Qdini, Micromooog Synthesizer: Biff Hannon, Piccolo: Bob Militello)	Maynard Ferguson, Nick Lane	6:05
2.	"Fantasy" (Arranged by Gordon Johnson, Piccolo Trumpet: Joe Mosello)	Maurice White, Eddie del Barrio, Verdine White	4:21
3.	"Theme from Battlestar Galactica" (Arranged by Nick Lane, Flute: Militello)	Stu Phillips, Glen A. Larson	5:56
4.	"Stella By Starlight" (Arranged by Slide Hampton, Trombone Solo: Phil Gray, Alto Solo: Mike Migliore)	Victor Young, Ned Washington	7:15
Total length:			23:37

Side two
No.	Title	Writer(s)	Length
1.	"Birdland" (Arranged by Nick Lane, Tenor Solo: Eric Traub, Guitar Solo: Qdini)	Joe Zawinul	5:38
2.	"Baker Street" (Arranged by Biff Hannon, Alto Solo: Migliore, Bass Guitar: Gordon Johnson)	Gerry Rafferty	6:50
3.	"How Ya Doin' Baby" (Arranged by Hannon, Guitar Solo: Qdini)	Ferguson, Biff Hannon	4:00
4.	"Over the Rainbow" (Arranged by Hannon, Flute Solo: Militello)	Harold Arlen, E.Y. Harburg	5:29
Total length:			21:57

== Personnel ==
=== The MF Band ===
- Maynard Ferguson: MF Holton Trumpets, Firebird, Superbone, Flugelhorn
- Eric Traub: Tenor & Soprano Saxophone
- Mike Migliore: Alto & Soprano Saxophone, Flute
- Bob Militello: Baritone Saxophone, Flute, Alto flute, Piccolo
- Nick Lane: Trombone
- Phil Gray: Trombone
- Stan Mark: Trumpet, Flugelhorn
- Joe "Loon" Mosello: Trumpet, Flugelhorn, Piccolo trumpet, Percussion
- Dennis Noday: Trumpet, Flugelhorn
- Dan Welty: Trumpet, Flugelhorn
- Ron Tooley: Trumpet, Flugelhorn
- Biff Hannon: Fender Rhodes Electric Piano, Polymoog, Micromoog & Minimoog Synthesizers
- Gordon Johnson: Electric & Acoustic Bass, Flute
- John Qdini: Acoustic & Electric guitar
- Bob Economou: Drums
- Peter Erskine: Drums
- Gordon, Peter, Biff, John, Kim, Tony, Joe & Nick: Handclaps

=== Additional musicians ===
- Ralph MacDonald: Percussion
- Rubens Bassini: Percussion
- Robert E White: Synthesizer
- String Concertmasters: Aaron Rosan, Paul Winter

=== Vocals ===
- Maretha Stewart
- Hilda Harris
- Barbara Massey
- Yolanda McCullough
- Vivian Cherry

=== Production ===
- Produced by Maynard Ferguson
- Associate Producer: Dr. George Butler
- Engineered by Mike Delugg at Mediasound, New York City
- Engineered by Stan Tonkel at CBS 30th Street Studio, NYC ("Stella by Starlight")
- Mastered by Bob Ludwig at Masterdisk Studios, NYC
- Cover Illustration: Milton Glaser
- Design: Paula Scher

=== Management ===
- Personal Management: Kim Ferguson
- Business Management: Ames & Associates
- Representation: The Willard Alexander Agency
- Public Relations: Peter Levinson Communications
- Musical Coordinator: Gene Bianco
