= M.F. Horn 4&5: Live At Jimmy's =

M.F. Horn 4&5: Live at Jimmy's

Live album by Maynard Ferguson
- Released: 1974
- Recorded: July 10, 1973
- Venue: Jimmy Ryan's
- Genres: Jazz, Big band
- Length: 1:03:25
- Label: Columbia
- Producer: Teo Macero

Maynard Ferguson chronology
M.F. Horn 3 (1973)	M.F. Horn 4&5: Live at Jimmy's (1974)	Chameleon (1974)

M.F. Horn 4&5: Live at Jimmy's is the 6th big band album by Canadian jazz trumpeter Maynard Ferguson for Columbia Records. Live at Jimmy's was recorded during a lunchtime event, where members of the press and record company executives were invited to hear Maynard and his band play a special two-hour mid-day concert.

== Background ==
During the 1973 Newport Jazz Festival (which had been moved to New York City the year before), Maynard and his band were playing a series of dates at Jimmy Ryan's jazz club on West 52nd street. After recording Ella Fitzgerald's performance for the festival at Carnegie Hall, producer Teo Macero and music critic Mort Goode went over to Jimmy's to catch Maynard's set later that evening, along with a handful of Columbia Records executives. Due to the excitement of the performance and the quality of the venue, it was quickly decided that this needed to be captured for a live album.

The thought came up that quickly. Record the band "live" in the room and capture the tremendous feeling that was pouring out. But Maynard was closing two nights later. There was no time to make arrangements. They couldn't extend the stay even one extra night. But they would come back from upstate New York where they were working Sunday and record during the day on Tuesday.

— Mort Goode, M.F. Horn 4&5: Live at Jimmy's, liner notes

== Reviews ==
Professional ratings
Review scores
Source	Rating
AllMusic	4/5 stars
DownBeat	3.5/5 stars

Live at Jimmy's was well received by fans and critics alike. According to Scott Yanow at AllMusic, "This double LP is easily Maynard Ferguson's best jazz-oriented recording for Columbia."

Eric Kriss gave the album a 3.5 star rating for DownBeat. He wrote, "The music is funky, tight and pushy . . . The sound Ferguson is searching for—and the audience to go with it—is more dynamic, more explosive than his previous efforts . . . The band manages to combine a fair amount of musical freedom without losing the precision necessary for the light arrangements".

== Reissues ==
In 2007, M.F. Horn 4&5: Live at Jimmy's was reissued by Wounded Bird Records.

== Track listing ==
Side one
No.	Title	Writer(s)	Length
1.	"Teonova" (Dedicated to Teo Macero)	Pete Jackson	6:19
2.	"MacArthur Park"	Jimmy Webb	8:27
Total length:			14:46

Side two
No.	Title	Writer(s)	Length
1.	"Left Bank Express"	Jackson	5:51
2.	"I'm Gettin' Sentimental Over You"	Ned Washington, George Bassman	4:45
3.	"Two for Otis"	Don Menza	7:01
Total length:			17:37

Side three
No.	Title	Writer(s)	Length
1.	"Stay Loose With Bruce"	Ernie Wilkins	5:28
2.	"Nice 'n Juicy"	Jeffrey Steinberg	9:59
Total length:			15:27

Side four
No.	Title	Writer(s)	Length
1.	"The Fox Hunt"	Mike Abene	3:58
2.	"Got the Spirit"	Slide Hampton	9:53
3.	"Blue Birdland"	Jimmy Giuffre	1:44
Total length:			15:35

== Credits ==
Musicians

- Maynard Ferguson: Trumpet
- Trumpets & Flugelhorn: Lin Biviano, Danny Cahn, John de Flon, Bob Summers
- Trombones: Randy Purcell, Graham Ellis
- Alto & soprano saxophone & flute: Andy MacIntosh
- Tenor sax & flute: Ferdinand Povel
- Baritone sax & flute: Bruce Johnstone
- Drums: Randy Jones
- Bass / Fender bass: Rick Petrone
- Electric piano: Pete Jackson

Production

- Producer: Teo Macero
- Engineer: Russ Payne
- Re-Mix Engineer: Stan Tonkel
- Mastering Engineer: Jack Ashkinazy
