= Primal Scream (Maynard Ferguson album) =

1976 jazz fusion album

Studio album by Maynard Ferguson
- Released: 1976
- Recorded: August–October 1975
- Studio: Media Sound
- Genre: Jazz; jazz fusion; funk; disco
- Length: 35:58
- Label: Columbia
- Producer: Bob James

Maynard Ferguson chronology
Chameleon (1975)	Primal Scream (1976)	Conquistador (1977)

Primal Scream is the eighth jazz album by Canadian trumpeter Maynard Ferguson on Columbia Records. Primal Scream marks the beginning of the second phase of Ferguson's career with Columbia, where his live big band sound is set aside in favor of lavish studio productions. The album credits reveal an all-star ensemble made up of New York's finest musicians, along with backing vocalists and strings were recruited for this release.

While most of the tracks would remain studio creations only, his rendition of "Pagliacci" would become a concert feature for his touring band, and was heard by millions when he performed it as part of the closing ceremonies of the 1976 Summer Olympics in Montreal.

== Reviews ==
Maynard's late-70s recordings were generally not well received by jazz purists, but AllMusic's Jim Newsom described Primal Scream by saying "Ferguson's trademark trumpet playing is featured in all its screaming glory..."

Professional ratings
Review scores
Source	Rating
AllMusic	3/5 stars

== Reissues ==
In 2004 Primal Scream was reissued by Wounded Bird Records.

== Track listing ==
All tracks arranged and conducted by Jay Chattaway

Side one
No.	Title	Writer(s)	Length
1.	"Primal Scream" (Rhythm section arranged by Gerry Block)	Jay Chattaway, Maynard Ferguson	7:07
2.	"The Cheshire Cat Walk" (Rhythm section arranged by Chick Corea)	Chick Corea	10:06
Total length:			17:13

Side two
No.	Title	Writer(s)	Length
1.	"Invitation"	Bronisław Kaper	5:32
2.	"Pagliacci" (Arranged & adapted by Jay Chattaway from the aria Vesti la giubba)	Ruggiero Leoncavallo	5:53
3.	"Swamp" (Rhythm section arranged by Eric Gale)	Eric Gale	7:20
Total length:			18:45

== Personnel ==
All credits adapted from album cover.

=== Musicians ===
- Maynard Ferguson: trumpet

=== Rhythm ===
- Drums: Steve Gadd
- Bass: Gary King
- Guitar: Eric Gale, Jeff Mironov, Jerry Friedman
- Percussion: Ralph MacDonald
- Piano, Arp Synthesizer, Clavinet: Bob James
- Electric piano and Mini Moog Synthesizer: Chick Corea ("The Cheshire Cat Walk" only)

=== Reeds ===
- Flute and Baritone saxophone: Bobby Militello
- Soprano & Tenor saxophone: Mark Colby
- Alto saxophone: David Sanborn
- Tenor Saxophone: Joe Farrell

=== Brass ===
- Trumpet: Marvin Stamm
- Trumpet and Flugelhorn: Jon Faddis, Bernie Glow, Stan Mark
- Trombone: Tony Studd
- Bass trombone: David Taylor, Paul Faulise
- French Horns: Brooks Tillotson, Earl Chapin

=== Singers ===
- Patti Austin
- Lani Groves
- Hilda Harris

=== Strings ===
- Violins: David Nadien, Max Ellen, Harry Cykman, Paul Gershman, Emanuel Green, Charles Libove, Joseph Malin, Frederick Buldi
- Violas: Theodore Israel, Emanuel Vardi
- Celli: Alan Schulman, Charles McCracken

=== Production ===
- Record producer by: Bob James
- Arranged and Conducted by: Jay Chattaway
- Recorded and Mixed by: Joe Jorgenson
- Additional Engineering by: Gerry Block
- Mastering Engineer: Jack Ashkinazy
- Cover Photo: David Arky, John Barrett
- Cover Design: John Berg, Andy Engel

=== Solos ===
- All Trumpet: Maynard Ferguson
- Soprano sax solo on Invitation: Mark Colby
- Tenor Sax solo on Primal Scream and Cheshire Cat: Mark Colby
- Synthesizer solo on Cheshire Cat: Chick Corea
- Flute solo on Pagliacci and Swamp: Bobby Militello
