= Maynard Ferguson =

Canadian jazz trumpeter and bandleader (1928–2006)

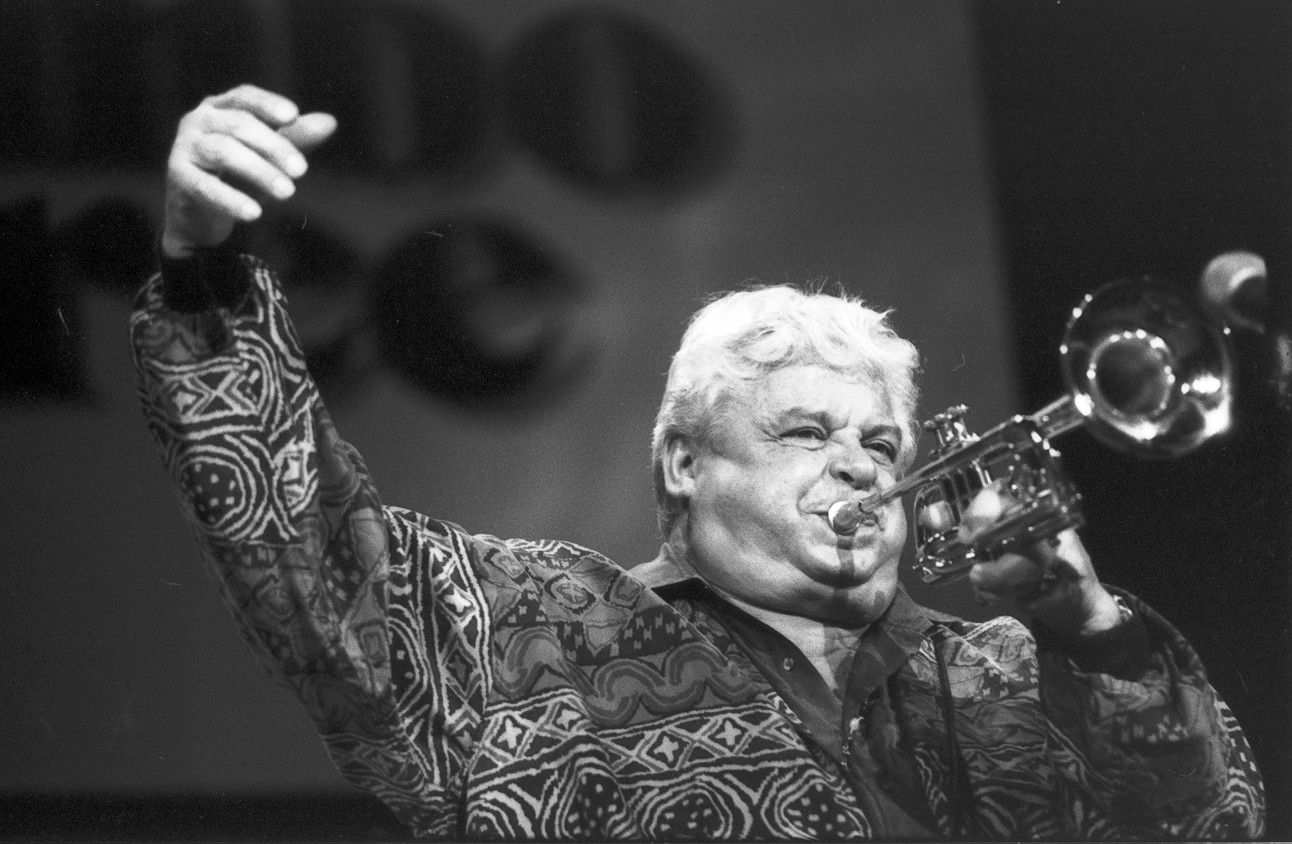
- Ferguson in Warsaw, 1991

Background information
- Born: Walter Maynard Ferguson; May 4, 1928; Verdun, Quebec, Canada
- Died: August 23, 2006 (aged 78) Ventura, California, U.S.
- Genres: Jazz; jazz rock; jazz fusion; pop
- Occupations: Musician; bandleader
- Instruments: Trumpet; flugelhorn; Firebird; trombone; valve trombone; superbone; baritone horn; French horn; soprano saxophone
- Years active: 1939–2006
- Labels: EmArcy; Roulette; Mainstream; Columbia; Enterprise
- Website: maynardferguson.com

Walter Maynard Ferguson CM (May 4, 1928 – August 23, 2006) was a Canadian jazz trumpeter and bandleader. He came to prominence in Stan Kenton's orchestra before forming his own big band in 1957. He was noted for his bands, which often served as stepping stones for up-and-coming talent, his versatility on several instruments, and his ability to play in a high register.

== Biography ==
=== Early life and education ===
Ferguson was born in Verdun (now part of Montreal), Quebec, Canada. Encouraged by his parents, he started playing piano and violin at the age of four. At nine years old, he heard a cornet for the first time in his local church and asked his parents to buy one for him. When he was thirteen, he soloed with the Canadian Broadcasting Corporation Orchestra. He was heard frequently on the CBC, notably featured on a "Serenade for Trumpet in Jazz" written for him by Morris Davis. He won a scholarship to the Conservatoire de musique du Québec à Montréal where he studied from 1943 to 1948 with Bernard Baker.

Ferguson dropped out of the High School of Montreal when he was fifteen to pursue a music career, performing in dance bands led by Stan Wood, Roland David, and Johnny Holmes. Although trumpet was his primary instrument, he also performed on other brass and reed instruments. He took over the dance band formed by his saxophonist brother Percy, playing dates in the Montreal area and serving as an opening act for touring bands from Canada and the U.S. During this period, he came to the attention of American bandleaders and began receiving offers to go to the U.S.

In 1948, Ferguson moved to the United States, intending to join Stan Kenton's band, but it no longer existed, so Ferguson played with the bands of Boyd Raeburn, Jimmy Dorsey, and Charlie Barnet. The Barnet band included Doc Severinsen, Ray Wetzel, Johnny Howell, and Rolf Ericson. Ferguson was featured on Barnet's recording of "All The Things You Are" by Jerome Kern. The recording enraged Kern's widow and was withdrawn from sale.

=== Kenton and Hollywood ===
In January 1950, Kenton formed the Innovations Orchestra, a 40-piece jazz orchestra with strings. After the folding of the Barnet band, Ferguson was available for the first rehearsal on January 1. One of the Orchestra's recordings was named "Maynard Ferguson," one of a series of pieces named after featured soloists. When Kenton returned to a more practical 19-piece jazz band, Ferguson continued with him at third chair with numerous solo features. Notable recordings from this period that feature Ferguson include "Invention for Guitar and Trumpet", "What's New?", and "The Hot Canary".

In 1953, Ferguson left Kenton and spent the next three years as principal trumpet for Paramount Pictures. He appeared on 46 soundtracks, including The Ten Commandments. He also played on several other non-Paramount film soundtracks, usually those with jazz scores. Ferguson can clearly be discerned on several soundtracks from the time, including the Martin and Lewis films Living It Up and You're Never Too Young. He still recorded jazz, but his Paramount contract prevented him from playing in jazz clubs. This was sometimes circumvented by appearing under aliases such as "Tiger Brown" or "Foxy Corby". Although he enjoyed the steady income, he was unhappy with the lack of live performance opportunities and left Paramount in 1956.

=== The Birdland Dream Band ===
Ferguson played with the Pérez Prado Orchestra on the LP Havana 3 A.M., recorded in February and March 1956. In 1956, he joined the Birdland Dream Band, a 14-piece big band formed by Morris Levy as an "all-star" line-up, to play at Levy's Birdland jazz club in New York City. Although the name "Birdland Dream Band" was short-lived and is represented by only two albums over the course of a year, this band became the core of Ferguson's performing band for the next nine years.

The band included Mike Abene, Jaki Byard, Bill Chase, Ronnie Cuber, Frankie Dunlop, Don Ellis, Joe Farrell, Dusko Goykovich, Tony Inzalaco, Rufus Jones, Willie Maiden, Ron McClure, Rob McConnell, Don Menza, Lanny Morgan, Wayne Shorter, and Joe Zawinul. Those who were both arrangers and performers included Herb Geller, Slide Hampton, Bill Holman, and Don Sebesky.

In 1959, Ferguson was a guest with the New York Philharmonic Orchestra under the direction of Leonard Bernstein, performing Symphony No. 2 in C "Titans" by William Russo.

In 1961, Ferguson composed the theme music for the 1961–1962 ABC adventure drama television series Straightaway. His 1961 album "Straightaway" Jazz Themes contained the music he composed for the series.

As big bands declined in popularity and economic viability in the 1960s, Ferguson's band performed less frequently. He began to feel musically stifled and sensed a resistance to change among his American jazz audiences. According to an interview in DownBeat, he was quoted as saying that if the band did not play "Maria" or "Ole," the fans went home disappointed. He began performing with a sextet before shutting down his big band in 1966.

=== Millbrook, India, and psychedelics ===
After leaving his long-time recording contract and the end of his main club gig, Ferguson moved his family to the Hitchcock Estate in Millbrook, New York in November 1963 to live with Timothy Leary, Ram Dass, and their community from Harvard University. He and his wife Flo used LSD, psilocybin and other psychedelic drugs. They lived at Millbrook for about three years, playing clubs and recording several albums. Ferguson was mentioned in The Electric Kool-Aid Acid Test, which detailed the psychedelic scene.

In 1967, as the Millbrook experiment was ending, Ferguson moved his family to India and taught at the Krishnamurti-based Rishi Valley School near Madras. He was associated with the Sri Sathya Sai Institute of Higher Learning's Boys Brass Band, which he founded and helped teach for several years. While in India, he was influenced by Sathya Sai Baba, whom he considered as his spiritual guru.

=== England and jazz rock ===
As a Canadian in England, Ferguson avoided the union's ban on American musicians. In 1969, he moved to Oakley Green, a hamlet on the outskirts of Windsor, near London. He had two houses while he was in the UK, the final one a three-story house by the River Thames. That same year, Ferguson signed with CBS Records.

He started a sixteen- to eighteen-piece big band with British musicians playing jazz rock. The band got attention for its version of "MacArthur Park" by Jim Webb. Ferguson's band made its North American debut in 1971.

In 1970 he led the band on The Simon Dee Show from London Weekend Television.

=== Return to the U.S. ===
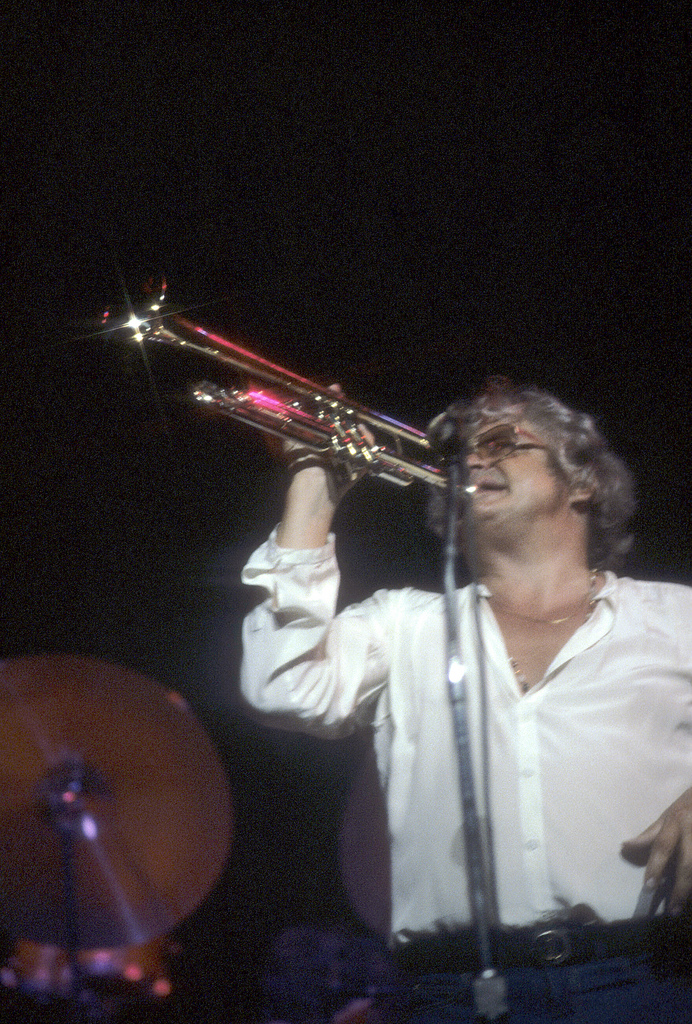
Ferguson in San Francisco, 1978

Ferguson moved to New York City in 1973, then relocated to Ojai, California less than two years later. He replaced the British band members with American musicians while reducing membership to twelve: four trumpets, two trombones, three saxophones, and a three-piece rhythm section. Albums from this period include M.F. Horn 4&5: Live At Jimmy's and Chameleon, recorded in 1973 and 1974 in New York. Ferguson took advantage of the burgeoning jazz education movement by hiring musicians from colleges with jazz programs, such as Berklee College of Music, North Texas State University and the University of Miami. He performed for young audiences and gave master classes in colleges and high schools. This strategy helped him develop an audience that sustained him for the rest of his career.

In 1975, Ferguson began working with Bob James on a series of commercially successful albums with large groups of session musicians, including strings, vocalists, and guest soloists. The first of these albums was Primal Scream, featuring Chick Corea, Mark Colby, Steve Gadd, and Bobby Militello. The second, Conquistador (1976) yielded a No. 22 pop single, "Gonna Fly Now" from the movie Rocky, earning him a gold album. He maintained a hectic touring schedule. The commercial success included adding a guitarist and an additional percussionist to his band's line-up. In mid-1976, Ferguson performed a solo trumpet piece for the closing ceremonies of the Summer Olympics in Montreal, symbolically "blowing out the flame".

Ferguson became frustrated with Columbia over the inability to use his working band on albums, and to play jazz songs on them. His contract with Columbia ended after the release of the album Hollywood (1982), produced by bassist Stanley Clarke. During that time, he recorded an instrumental version of the Michael Jackson song "Don't Stop 'Til You Get Enough"; the song would later be used by Rede Globo as the theme song of Vídeo Show, which ran on the network between 1983 and 2019.

Ferguson recorded three big band albums with smaller labels before forming High Voltage, a fusion septet, in 1986. This smaller ensemble, which featured multi-reed player Denis DiBlasio, gave Ferguson the freedom to explore in a less structured format. High Voltage recorded two albums, produced by Jim Exon, his manager and son in law.

=== Big Bop Nouveau ===
To mark his 60th birthday in 1988, Maynard Ferguson returned to a large band format and to more mainstream jazz. That then led to the formation of Big Bop Nouveau, a nine-piece band featuring two trumpets, one trombone, three reeds and a three-piece rhythm section which became his standard touring group for the remainder of his career. Later, due to the increasing responsibilities being placed on the trumpet players, the baritone sax position was replaced by a third trumpet player. The band's repertoire included original jazz compositions and modern arrangements of jazz standards, with occasional pieces from his 1970s book and even modified charts from the Birdland Dream Band era; this format proved to be successful with audiences and critics. The band recorded extensively, including albums backing vocalists Diane Schuur and Michael Feinstein.

Big Bop Nouveau toured the world extensively; in 2005 it embarked on a tour of eight months playing an average of two hundred shows a year. The group was tour managed by Memphis legend Ed Sargent, and mixed by audio mogul Mike Freeland. Although in later years Ferguson's playing occasionally lost some of the range and phenomenal accuracy of his youth, he always remained an exciting performer, touring an average of nine months a year with Big Bop Nouveau for the remainder of his life. Ferguson died on August 23, 2006.

== Personal life ==
In 1973, Ferguson settled in Ojai, California, where he lived to the end of his life. His first marriage was to singer Kay Brown. His marriage to Flo Ferguson (in 1956) lasted until her death on February 27, 2005. Ferguson had four daughters: Kim, Corby, Lisa, and Wilder and a son, Bentley, who predeceased his parents. Kim Ferguson managed Ferguson's career for 15 years in the 1970s and 1980s with husband and producer, Jim Exon. Wilder Ferguson is married to jazz pianist, film composer and former Big Bop Nouveau member Christian Jacob. Lisa Ferguson is a writer and film maker living in Los Angeles. At the time of his death, Ferguson had two granddaughters, Erica and Sandra.

Ferguson died as a result of kidney and liver failure, on August 23, 2006, at the Community Memorial Hospital in Ventura, California.

== Versatility ==
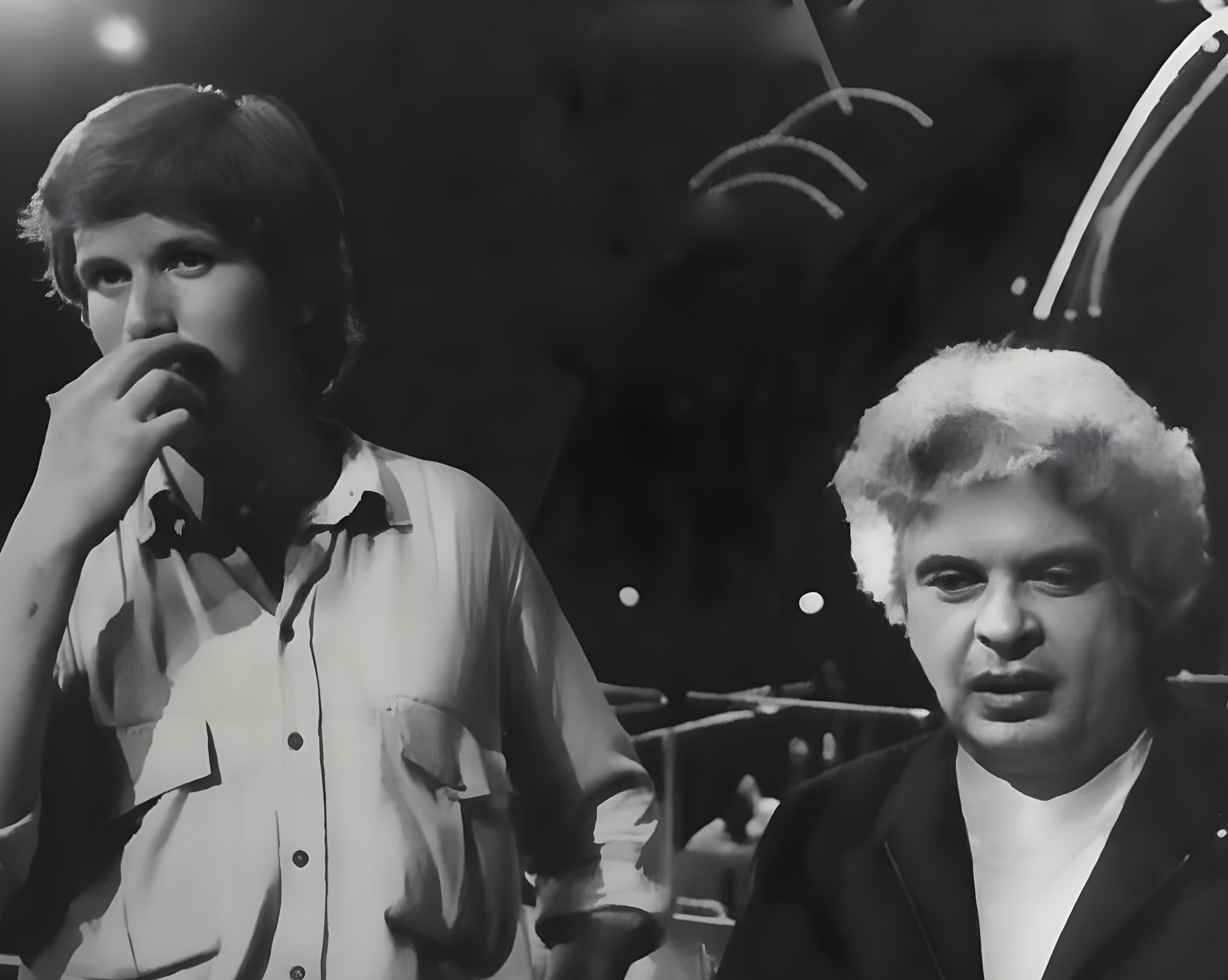
Ferguson was guest star in Italy on TV show with the orchestra conducted by Pino Presti in July 1977.

Although his principal instrument was the trumpet, Ferguson frequently doubled on other brass instruments, most notably the relatively uncommon valve trombone. Several recording sessions with bandleader Russell Garcia included a four-trombone ensemble in which Ferguson played only valve trombone. Publicity shots and album covers from the 1950s showed Ferguson with his 'quartet' of trumpet, valve trombone, baritone horn, and French horn. Recordings of the latter two are rare; the French horn vanished in later years, but the baritone horn appeared on the 1974 album Chameleon. He switched to the combination valve/slide Superbone and flugelhorn on all but his last recorded album.

Ferguson designed the Firebird and the Superbone. Trumpeter Rajesh Mehta bought this trumpet while living in Amsterdam and played the Firebird from 1998 until 2011 when he had American trumpet maker George Schlub create the Orka-M Naga Phoenix trumpet for him. The Superbone was another hybrid instrument, a trombone with additional valves played with the left hand. Ferguson incorporated Indian instruments and influences in his music.

Ferguson was not the first trumpeter to play in the extreme upper register (which had been employed by performers such as Cat Anderson), but he could play high notes with full, rich tone, power, and musicality. In interviews he said that his command of the upper registers was based mostly on breath control, something he discovered in his youth in Montreal. He attributed the longevity of his technique to the spiritual and yoga studies he pursued in India.

Ferguson brought charisma to a musical genre that is often seen as cold and cerebral. His obituary in The Washington Post stated:

Ferguson lit up thousands of young horn players, most of them boys, with pride and excitement. In a (high school) world often divided between jocks and band nerds, Ferguson crossed over, because he approached his music almost as an athletic event. On stage, he strained, sweated, heaved and roared. He nailed the upper registers like Shaq nailing a dunk or Lawrence Taylor nailing a running back – and the audience reaction was exactly the same: the guttural shout, the leap to their feet, the fists in the air. We cheered Maynard as a gladiator, a combat soldier, a prize fighter, a circus strongman – choose your masculine archetype.

== Awards and honors ==
Ferguson was appointed a Member of the Order of Canada in 2003.

In 1950, 1951, and 1952, Ferguson won the DownBeat Readers' Poll for best trumpeter. In 1992, he was inducted into the DownBeat Jazz Hall of Fame.

Maynard Ferguson played a special solo trumpet piece as part of the closing ceremonies for the Summer Olympics in Montreal, Canada, the XXI Olympiad, 1976.

In 2000, Ferguson was initiated as a brother of Kappa Kappa Psi at the Gamma Xi Chapter (University of Maryland at College Park). In 2006, he was presented with Phi Mu Alpha Sinfonia music fraternity's Charles E. Lutton Man of Music Award at its national convention in Cleveland, Ohio. He had been initiated as an honorary member of the Fraternity's Xi Chi Chapter at Tennessee Tech University in 1976.

The "Maynard Ferguson Institute of Jazz Studies" at Rowan University was created in 2000, the same year Rowan bestowed Ferguson with his only Honorary Doctorate degree. The institute, under direction of Ferguson's friend Denis Diblasio, supports the Rowan Jazz Program in training young jazz musicians.

In 2000, he was given an Honorary Doctorate Degree by Rowan University in Glassboro, New Jersey, and created the Maynard Ferguson Institute of Jazz Studies under the direction of Denis DiBlasio in their College of Performing Arts. The Sherman Jazz Museum in Sherman, Texas opened in 2010 and houses the extensive memorabilia of Ferguson's estate.

Maynard Ferguson band alumni regrouped for a memorial concert soon after his death, led by trumpeters Wayne Bergeron, Patrick Hession, and Eric Miyashiro.

== Discography ==
=== As leader ===
- 1955 – Jam Session featuring Maynard Ferguson (EmArcy)
- 1956 – Maynard Ferguson's Hollywood Party (EmArcy)
- 1956 – Around the Horn with Maynard Ferguson (EmArcy)
- 1956 – Dimensions (EmArcy)
- 1955 – Maynard Ferguson Octet (EmArcy)
- 1957 – Maynard Ferguson and His Birdland Dream Band
- 1957 – The Birdland Dream Band, Vol. 2
- 1957 – Boy with Lots of Brass (EmArcy)
- 1958 – Swingin' My Way Through College (Roulette)
- 1958 – A Message from Newport (Roulette)
- 1959 – A Message from Birdland (Roulette)
- 1959 – Maynard Ferguson Plays Jazz for Dancing (Roulette)
- 1960 – Newport Suite (Roulette)
- 1960 – Let's Face the Music and Dance (Roulette)
- 1961 – Maynard '61 (Roulette)
- 1961 – Double Exposure with Chris Connor (Atlantic)
- 1961 – "Straightaway" Jazz Themes (Roulette)
- 1961 – Two's Company with Chris Connor (Roulette)
- 1962 – Maynard '62 (Roulette)
- 1962 – Si! Si! M.F. (Roulette)
- 1963 – The New Sounds of Maynard Ferguson (Cameo)
- 1963 – Message from Maynard (Roulette)
- 1963 – Maynard '63 (Roulette)
- 1964 – Maynard '64 (Roulette)
- 1964 – Come Blow Your Horn (Cameo)
- 1964 – Color Him Wild (Mainstream) – Reissued as Dues
- 1964 – The Blues Roar (Mainstream) – Reissued as Screamin' Blues
- 1965 – The Maynard Ferguson Sextet (Mainstream) – Reissued as Six By Six and as Magnitude with bonus tracks
- 1966 – Ridin' High (Enterprise)
- 1967 – Trumpet Rhapsody (MPS) – Reissued as Maynard Ferguson 1969
- 1968 – The Ballad Style of Maynard Ferguson (CBS)
- 1968 – Maynard and Gustav (Supraphon)
- 1970 – M.F. Horn (Columbia) – also released as The World of Maynard Ferguson
- 1971 – Maynard Ferguson (Columbia) – also released as Alive and Well in London
- 1972 – M.F. Horn Two (Columbia)
- 1973 – M.F. Horn 3 (Columbia)
- 1974 – M.F. Horn 4&5: Live At Jimmy's (Columbia)
- 1974 – Chameleon (Columbia)
- 1976 – Primal Scream (Columbia)
- 1977 – Conquistador (Columbia)
- 1977 – New Vintage (Columbia)
- 1978 – Carnival (Columbia)
- 1979 – Hot (Columbia)
- 1980 – It's My Time (Columbia)
- 1981 – Hollywood (Columbia)
- 1983 – Storm (Palo Alto)
- 1983 – Live from San Francisco from the Great American Music Hall (Palo Alto)
- 1986 – Body and Soul
- 1987 – High Voltage (Intima)
- 1988 – High Voltage 2 (Intima)
- 1990 – Big Bop Nouveau (Intima)
- 1992 – Footpath Cafe (Avion)
- 1994 – Live from London
- 1994 – Live at Peacock Lane Hollywood 1957 (Jazz Hour)
- 1994 – These Cats Can Swing (Concord)
- 1995 – Live at the Great American Music Hall Part 2 (Status)
- 1996 – One More Trip to Birdland (Concord)
- 1998 – Brass Attitude (Concord)
- 1999 – Big City Rhythms with Michael Feinstein
- 2001 – Swingin' for Schuur with Diane Schuur (Concord)
- 2006 – M.F. Horn VI: Live at Ronnie's

=== Posthumous releases ===
- 2007 – The One and Only

=== Selected film soundtracks ===
- The Wild One (1953)
- Living It Up (1954)
- Rear Window (1954)
- You're Never Too Young (1955)
- Oreste (short) (1955)
- The Man With The Golden Arm (1955)
- Blackboard Jungle (1955)
- The Ten Commandments (1956)
- Crime in the Streets (1956)
- The Proud and Profane (1956)
- Hot Rod Girl (1956)
- Dino (film) (1957)
- The Delicate Delinquent (1957)
- Hot Rod Rumble (1957)
- Singin' and Swingin' (short) (1961)
- Urbanissimo (short) (1966)
- Indian Summer (1972)
- Uncle Joe Shannon (1978)

=== As sideman ===
With Harry Belafonte

- Belafonte (1955)
- Calypso (1956)

With Buddy Bregman

- Bing Sings Whilst Bregman Swings (Verve, 1956)
- Ella Fitzgerald Sings The Cole Porter Songbook, (Verve, 1956)
- Ella Fitzgerald Sings The Rodgers and Hart Songbook (Verve, 1956)
- Jerry Lewis Just Sings (Capitol, 1956)
- Swinging Kicks (Verve, 1957)
- Boy Meets Girl (Verve, 1957)

With Russ Garcia

- Four Horns and Lush Life (Japan) (Bethlehem, 1955)
- Russ Garcia and his Four Trombone Band (Fresh Sound)

With Stan Kenton

- Innovations in Modern Music (Capitol, 1950)
- Stan Kenton Presents (Capitol, 1950)
- New Concepts of Artistry in Rhythm (Capitol, 1953)
- Popular Favorites by Stan Kenton (Capitol, 1953)
- Sketches on Standards (Capitol, 1953)
- This Modern World (Capitol, 1953)
- The Kenton Era (Capitol, 1940–54, [1955])
- Kenton in Hi-Fi (Capitol, 1956)
- The Innovations Orchestra (Capitol, 1950–51 [1997])

With Perez Prado

- Voodoo Suite (1955)
- Havanna 3 A.M. (1956)

With Shorty Rogers

- Cool and Crazy (RCA Victor, 1953)
- Shorty Rogers Courts the Count (RCA Victor, 1954)
- Shorty Rogers Plays Richard Rodgers (RCA Victor, 1957)

With Pete Rugolo

- Something Cool (Mono) with June Christy (1954)
- Introducing Pete Rugolo (Columbia, 1954)
- Adventures in Rhythm (Columbia, 1954)
- Rugolomania (Columbia, 1955)
- New Sounds by Pete Rugolo (Harmony, 1954–55, [1957])
- Music for Hi-Fi Bugs (EmArcy, 1956)
- Out on a Limb (EmArcy, 1956)
- An Adventure in Sound: Brass in Hi-Fi (Mercury, 1956 [1958])

With others

- Skin Deep, Louis Bellson (Norgran, 1953)
- Dinah Jams, Dinah Washington (1954)
- Jam Session with Clifford Brown and Clark Terry (EmArcy, 1954)
- In the Land of Hi-Fi with Georgie Auld and His Orchestra, Georgie Auld (EmArcy, 1955)
- The Swingin'st, Vido Musso (Crown, 1956)
- Spanish Fever, Fania All-Stars (1978)
- Chicago 13, Chicago (Columbia, 1979)
- Special Delivery Featuring Maynard Ferguson, Tito Puente (Concord, 1996)
- Indian Express/Mani & Co, L. Subramaniam (Milestone, 1999)
- BeBop Your Best, Red Grammer (Red Note, 2005)
- Plays Well with Others, Wayne Bergeron (Concord, 2007)

=== As producer ===
- Maynard Ferguson Presents Christian Jacob (Concord, 1997)
- Maynard Ferguson Presents Tom Garling (Concord, 1997)

== See also ==
- Music of Canada
- Canadian Music Hall of Fame
