= Jim Moran (publicist) =

American publicist (1908–1999)

On the Vox Pop radio program for February 4, 1939, publicist Jim Moran was interviewed by Parks Johnson and Wally Butterworth as he prepared to throw eggs at an electric fan.

James Sterling Moran (January 1, 1908 – October 18, 1999) was a publicist, actor, and a press agent for film studios, manufacturers, retailers, Washington politicians from the 1930s to the 1980s. In 1989, Time ranked him as "the supreme master of that most singular marketing device--the publicity stunt."

== Early life ==
Born in Woodstock, Virginia, in 1907. Moran was the son of a chimney maker. When he was 12 years old, he was riding a bicycle and was hit by a car. The driver was so relieved to see Moran unharmed that he gave him $100, which Moran immediately used to take a train to New Orleans, returning home two weeks later.

Instead of attending college, Moran took a variety of jobs: a tour guide in Washington, an airline executive and manager of a studio where Congressmen recorded speeches for local radio. Moran married several times but had no children.

== Notable stunts ==
His attention-grabbing publicity stunts began in the 1930s. He made his mark when he went to Alaska on behalf of General Electric and sold a refrigerator to an Eskimo. On February 4, 1939, he was interviewed by Parks Johnson and Wally Butterworth on the Vox Pop radio program. Claiming that one must give in to impulsive behavior because inhibitions were "warping" our personalities, he threw eggs at an electric fan.

In a Nevada river, during the 1944 Presidential campaign, he changed horses in midstream. Other stunts included walking a bull through a New York City china shop and promoting a real-estate development by spending ten days looking for a needle that had been dropped into a haystack. To publicize the 1947 movie The Egg and I, Moran sat on an ostrich egg for 19 days, four hours and 32 minutes. In the late 1940s, he promoted a Broadway show with a taxi constructed so that a chimpanzee was the apparent driver (with Moran secretly driving from the back seat).

In 1959, for the premiere of The Mouse That Roared, he opened an embassy in Washington for a mythical country. To publicize a candy bar, he planned to fly a midget across Central Park in a kite, but police squelched the stunt, prompting Moran to remark, "'It's a sad day for American capitalism when a man can't fly a midget on a kite over Central Park."

== Radio and film ==
He acted in several films: The Body Snatcher (1945), Specter of the Rose (1946), The Mask (1961) and Is There Sex After Death? (1971). He was a panelist on the 1954 TV quiz show What's in a Word? along with Clifton Fadiman, Audrey Meadows, Faye Emerson and Mike Wallace. Moran appeared on The Mike Douglas Show in 1964, and one of his last appearances was promoting the movie Yellowbeard (1983) on Late Night with David Letterman.

Moran's show business and writer friends included Burl Ives, Lee J. Cobb, John Henry Faulk and the humorist H. Allen Smith, who wrote extensively about Moran in his books Lost in the Horse Latitudes (1944) and The Compleat Practical Joker (1953). At age 91, Jim Moran died in an Englewood, New Jersey retirement home on October 18, 1999, survived by his brother, Paul Moran, of Alexandria, Virginia.

== See also ==
- Hugh Troy
