= Kathie Fitch =

American actress (1948–1990)

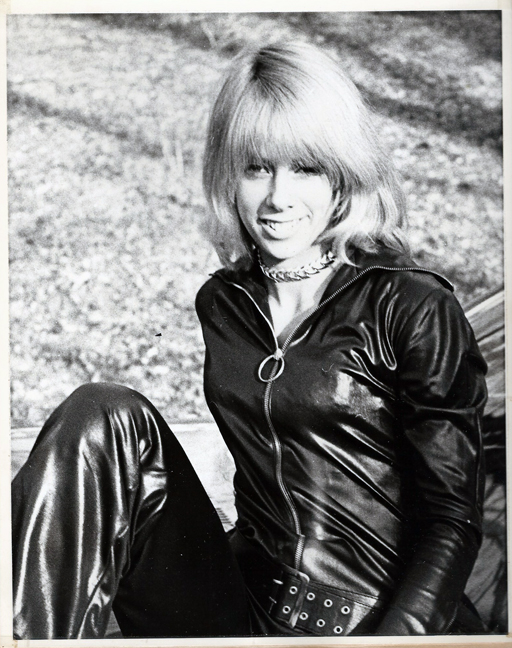
- Publicity photo
- Born: Kathie Elizabeth Fitch
- Other names: Kathie Everett; Chris Jordan
- Occupation: Actress
- Years active: 1971-1976

Kathie Fitch, also known for having acted under the stage names Chris Jordan and Kathie Everett, was an American actress. Recognized for her comedic timing and eccentric characters, she was best known for her collaborations with Joseph W. Sarno in numerous sexploitation films.

Fitch made her feature film acting debut in Alan Abel's acclaimed mondo film Is There Sex After Death? (1971). Afterward, Fitch frequently appeared in Sarno's films such as Confessions of a Young American Housewife and A Touch of Genie (both in 1974). Other films include the horror film Massage Parlor Murders! (1973), Chuck Vincent's vansploitation film Blue Summer (1973), and the cult comedy film Teenage Hitchhikers (1974), in which she was the top billed leading actress.

Fitch had steady acting work in stage plays and musicals during the beginning of her career. In 1965, she married pornographic actor Rob Everett; they divorced by the early 1970s. Fitch retired from acting by the end of the 1970s. She died in 1990 at the age of 44.

== Early life ==
Fitch was born in Wilton, Connecticut to a middle class family. Fitch began her career at age fifteen as a dancer, touring parts of New York and New England with the Justice-Frank Dance Company. Fitch attended Norwalk High School, in which she was a part of the Theatre, Ski, and Pep clubs. During her adolescence years, Fitch's hobbies included horseback riding and creative writing. While living with her parents, she commuted to New York to attend the American Academy of Dramatic Arts and the Actors Academy West while studying with acting coach David le Grant.

== Career ==
=== Film and stage ===
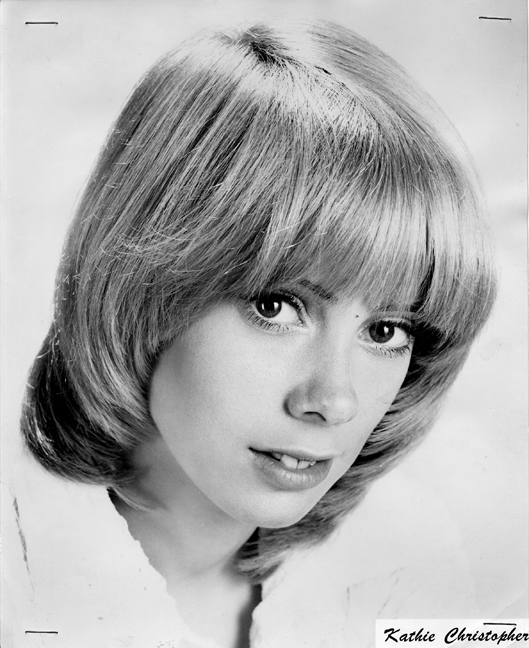
Headshot

In 1971, Fitch made her acting debut in the stage play Boeing, Boeing for the Le Barn Rouge in Jackson, Mississippi as Barbara, a German stewardess. For the remainder of the year, she would continue acting in productions for the Le Barn Rouge Theatre. From September 21 through October 16, Fitch acted in the play Private Lives as Sibyl. Critic Billy Skelton praised her performance as Sibyl, writing: "Kathie Everett is splendid as the pouty, pert, pretty Sibyl, the unfortunate girl who has just married Elyot." From October 26 through November 13, she acted in Lo and Behold as Minnetonka Smallflower.

Fitch had her mainstream film debut as a clinical patient in Alan Abel's comedy mondo film Is There Sex After Death? (1971), which featured Abel, Buck Henry, Holly Woodlawn, and Robert Downey Sr. in leading roles. While her role was a bit part, it was Fitch's first experience on a film set. In a marketing publicity stunt, Abel advertised the fictitious "Sex Olympics" that would air on live television—Fitch and her husband were heavily involved in the hoax by acting as contestants. Fitch later portrayed Lydia in the musical By Hex (1972) for the Mountain Playhouse in Jennerstown, Pennsylvania. Fitch's performance received acclaim: Dorothy Kantner of Daily American wrote that Fitch "certainly proves her professionalism."

Fitch had a supporting role as the victim Rosie in the horror film Massage Parlor Murders! and Miss No Name in Chuck Vincent's vansploitation film Blue Summer (both in 1973). Fitch later had a supporting role opposite Linda Lovelace in Joseph W. Sarno's satirical comedy spy film Deep Throat Part II (1974). In 1974, Fitch starred in Roberta Findlay's The Clam Digger's Daughter.

Fitch starred as Mouse alongside Sandra Peabody in the exploitation comedy film Teenage Hitchhikers (1974), which was her first time as a leading actress in a feature film. Her performance received positive reviews: one critic, Linda Gross, wrote for Los Angeles Times that her performance was "ingenious," The film has become a cult film and is one of filmmaker Quentin Tarantino's favorite films. It was included in the QT Six Lineup at the Quentin Tarantino Film Festival in 2005.

== Personal life ==
Fitch met Rob Everett while she was attending the American Academy of Dramatic Arts and began dating shortly after. In 1967, they married in Norwalk, Connecticut and had their honeymoon in Padre Island. Fitch had a pet monkey named Tough Guy who would travel with the couple as they pursued acting jobs for stage plays. Fitch was a fan of cooking Polynesian dishes. Although she didn't like the idea, Everett convinced her to appear with him in hardcore 8 mm porn loops as a means of earning extra income. They notably filmed a threesome with Linda Lovelace before she became a celebrity. The extra income they made allowed them to move into a studio apartment near the George Washington Bridge in New York City. Fitch often experimented with the drug LSD with Everett. However, after she had one bad trip, she stopped doing it. Once they stopped taking the drug, Everett found they weren't sexually compatible, which began to affect their marriage. They started swinging. While Everett was working in Europe, Fitch moved out, and they divorced after he returned.

== Selected filmography ==
=== Film ===
Year	Title	Role	Notes	References
1971	Is There Sex After Death?	Clinic Patient	Credited as Kathy Everett	
1973	Massage Parlor Murders!	Rosie	Credited as Kathie Everett	
1973	Blue Summer	Miss No Name	Credited as Chris Jordan	
1974	Deep Throat Part II	Sonya Toroscova	Credited as Cris Jordan	
1974	Mrs. Barrington	Any	Credited as Chris Jordan	
1974	A Touch of Genie	Genie	Credited as Karen Craig	
1974	The Clam Digger's Daughter		Credited as Chris Jordan	
1974	Teenage Hitchhikers	Mouse	Credited as Kathie Christopher	
1974	The Switch or How to Alter Your Ego	Louise White	Credited as Cris Jordan, Chris Jordan	
1975	The Big Con	Next	Credited as Karen Craig	
1975	The Mount of Venus	Sally	Uncredited	
1975	Abigail Lesley Is Back in Town	Alice Anne	Credited as Chris Jordan	
1975	Farewell Scarlet	Sylvia Steno	Credited as Chris Jordan	
1976	The Taking of Christina	Sally	Credited as Chris Jordan	
1976	Misty	Gretchen Tolliver	Credited as Chris Jordan	

=== Stage ===
Year	Title	Role	Venue	Notes	Ref(s)
1971	Boeing, Boeing	Barbara	Le Barn Rouge Theatre		
1971	Private Lives	Sibyl	Le Barn Rouge Theatre	September 21 through October 16	
1971	Lo and Behold	Minnetonka Smallflower	Le Barn Rouge Theatre	October 26 through November 13	
1972	By Hex	Lydia	Mountain Playhouse	July 4–9 and July 11–16	
