= Eric Edwards (actor) =

American pornographic actor and director

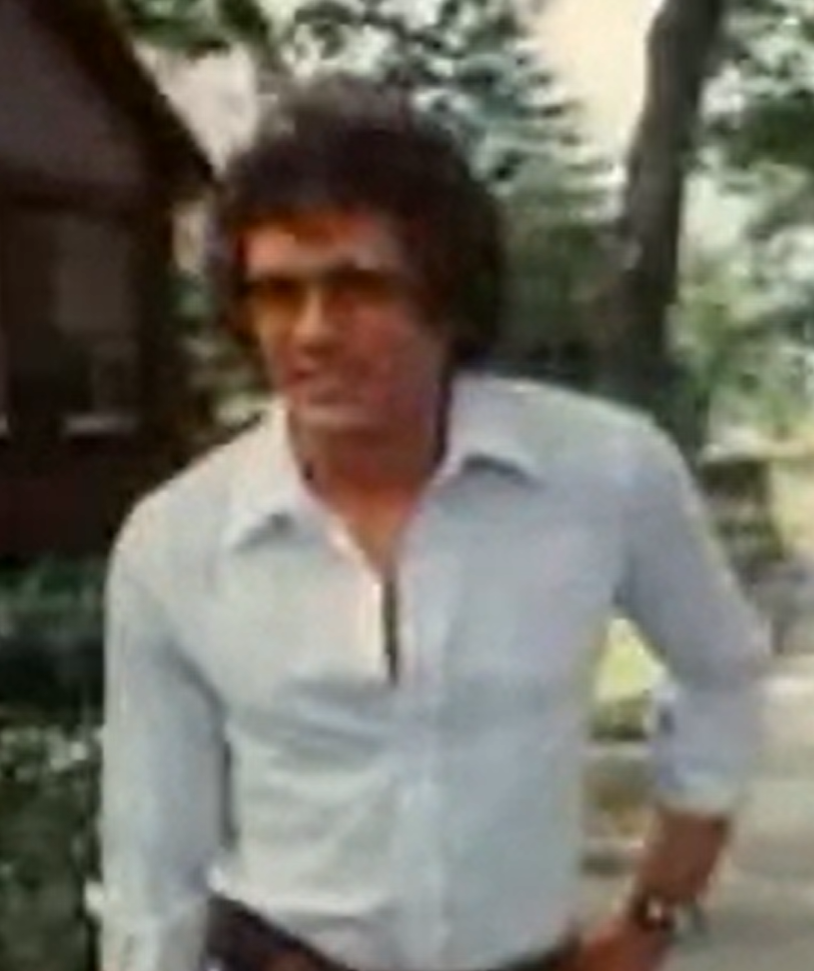
- Edwards (1978)
- Born: Robert Everett; November 30, 1945 (age 80); Michigan, U.S.
- Other names: Chris Kissen, Eric Cowards, Eric Roberts, Erik Edwards, Ken Smith, Rob Edwards, Rob Emmett, Rob Everett, Rob Evert, Rob Evertt, Robb Everett
- Education: American Academy of Dramatic Arts
- Occupations: Pornographic actor, director, photographer
- Years active: 1969–2007
- Style: Erotica, pornography

Eric Edwards (born Robert Everett on November 30, 1945) is an American pornographic actor, photographer, and director. Everett started in mainstream theater and transitioned into porn, starting in the late 1960s. Everett had a long career in the adult entertainment industry – over 40 years, making him the only actor in the world to appear in porn films in every decade through the 2000s since the porn industry started in the 1960s. Everett starred in and directed many films and photo shoots, including co-starring in the iconic film Debbie Does Dallas. He is a member of both the AVN and XRCO Halls of Fame. Bill Margold called Everett "one of the legends of the business" and "the Babe Ruth of porn."

== Early life and career ==
Edwards was born Robert Everett on November 30, 1945 in Michigan. He was raised near Waco, Texas. He was studying theater at Baylor University in 1965 when he and a group of friends auditioned in Dallas, Texas, to win scholarships to the American Academy of Dramatic Arts. Everett performed a scene from The Taming of the Shrew. Out of 24,000 people, Everett received three callbacks and was one of sixteen people selected. He left Baylor and moved to New York City to attend the academy, a decision he says "changed my life."

After relocating to New York, he lived in an apartment on the Upper West Side. He met Kathie Fitch, who was also attending the academy, in a movement class. They started dating. Fitch left the academy, and eventually moved in with Everett. Everett graduated from the academy in 1967 and that same year, the couple married in 1967 in Norwalk, Connecticut, near where Fitch's family lived. They acted together, performing in low budget plays throughout the country. They also used illegal drugs, including using LSD regularly.

Eventually, they relocated to Los Angeles, where Everett signed a three-year contract with the William Morris Agency, acting in commercials for Colgate, Gillette and Coleco. When the contract ended, he struggled to get work in Los Angeles, and Everett and Fitch returned to low budget theater. They moved to Norwalk, Connecticut, in 1971. The couple struggled to remain sexually compatible without the aid of drugs and they started swinging, which Everett credits with helping their relationship. Everett and Fitch had roles in the comedy, Is There Sex After Death?. It was the first time Everett went by a pseudonym, Robb Everett. The following year, in 1972, Everett starred in Boeing-Boeing, using the pseudonym that would be his adult film stage name: Eric Edwards. He would act steadily in summer stock and touring theatrical productions until the late 70s before deciding to pursue a career in porn full-time.

== Career in porn industry ==
Everett is the only porn actor to have worked in each decade of the porn film industry. In 1969, Everett answered a want ad for Screw for nude models and he and Fitch modeled for the magazine. Eventually, he was asked by Ted Snyder to perform in 8 mm film loops. While filming, they met Chuck Traynor and Linda Lovelace. Soon thereafter, Everett filmed his first scene, with Lovelace, and eventually a threesome with Fitch and Lovelace. Everett and Lovelace filmed over two dozen films together, including the controversial short Dogarama. He was noted for being able to confidently play a variety of characters, ranging from street punks to middle-aged businessmen.

=== 1970s ===
After the release of Deep Throat, Everett began regularly filming pornographic films. His first film was Blue Summer, directed by Chuck Vincent, in 1973. Early films Everett starred in include three films in 1973 (Maxines' Dating Service, Organ Juice, and Revolving Teens, the latter by Harry Reems) and Lady on the Couch in 1974. As a result of his busy film schedule, Everett was able to move back to New York City with Fitch, who was working under the name Chris Jordan. Everett began dating another woman named Kathy, and eventually, she moved in with Fitch and Everett, with Everett splitting his romantic time between the two women.

Everett introduced the second Kathy (nicknamed by Everett "Kathy 2") to the porn industry and they filmed one movie together, Fringe Benefits, which was Kathy 2's (who used the stage name Susie Mathews) only film. In 1975, Everett was hired by Joe Sarno to film two movies in Sweden: Butterfly and Laura's Toys. He had a brief romance with Laura's Toys co-star, Marie Forså. When he returned to New York, Fitch had moved out of their apartment. Everett went back to live with Kathy 2. By 1976, she had moved out and Everett and Fitch had divorced.

Everett continued to live in New York City and starred regularly in adult films. In 1977, he met Arcadia Lake. She was working at Show World, an adult theater run by Richard Basciano, when Everett was invited to perform a live show with Lake. The two visited Jamaica, where they photographed a series of scenes together, which were published in High Society. Everett and Lake moved in together. He co-starred alongside Lake in the iconic Debbie Does Dallas in 1978. Then in 1983, the couple filmed a mainstream, horror film titled The Prey.

In his first decade in porn, Everett was one of the most prolific male performers along with John Holmes and Jamie Gillis.

=== 1980s ===
In the early 1980s, Lake had a drug addiction, and the couple spent time in Jamaica to allow her to detox. Upon returning to the United States, they moved to California, where Everett was getting regular film offers in the growing Southern California adult film industry. He started working immediately upon moving to West Hollywood. He starred in films directed by Bob Chinn, including The Young Like It Hot and Sweet Little Foxes and Paul Vatelli's Bodies in Heat, all in 1983. Lake started using heroin again, and Everett tried heroin for the first time while working on a film in San Francisco. As a result, he became addicted to drugs, including cocaine. Lake left Everett and was believed to have died of an accidental overdose in 1991.

Everett's drug addiction made it hard for him to work for a brief time. He almost died twice from overdosing. When he was sober, he would work, traveling to San Francisco for films due to obscenity laws in place in Los Angeles. He started dating a woman, Onusa, who was neither in the adult film industry nor a drug user. He credits her with helping him end his addiction.

In 1984, Everett was inducted into the Porn Block of Fame in Santa Monica, alongside Kay Parker. Everett was also traveling between Los Angeles and New York for work. While in New York, he met a woman named Cheri Roberdes, whose stage name was Renee Summers, on the set of Great Sexpectations. Summers would move to California to live with Everett, and by 1986, they were married. Everett started directing adult films for couples. The films were romantic, with features of mainstream romance films combined with heavy sex scenes. In 1986, Everett and Summers moved to Tujunga, California and had a son, Tyler. Two years later, Everett and Summers ended their relationship.

=== 1990s ===
Everett filmed The Ultimate Lover in 1990, alongside Nina Hartley and Tracy Adams. The science fiction-themed porn is one of comedian Dave Attell's favorite porn films, which he describes as "kind of like a sexy Frankenstein's monster thing, and they create the ultimate fuck machine." The next year, Summers and Everett started to date again, eventually moving back in together. Everett continued to direct films, including the film Luke Ford calls Everett's finest film: Mirage, starring Ashlyn Gere. The following year, they had another son, Tanner. In 1994, an employee working for Everett on set, named Mondo, introduced Everett and Summers to crystal meth. Summers became addicted and Mondo burned the family's house down while using meth. Summers and Mondo left Everett and the two children. Everett directed 18 films over the course of two years, and continued to act in porn, trying to bring in income to provide for his two sons.

By 1996, Everett struggled to find work as a director, as the porn industry shifted from romance and glamour to more raw and aggressive themes. He worked at Totally Tasteless Video as a director, writer, editor and cameraman. In 1999, author Linda Alexander wrote a book about her friendship with Everett and his work, titled Dorothy From Kansas Meets the Wizard of X. He retired from the industry in the early 2000s.

== Life in retirement ==
Everett was inducted into the Erotica Hall of Fame in 2004. In 2005, he was diagnosed with colon cancer and he filed for bankruptcy after incurring excessive debt due to cancer treatment. That same year, his landlord sold the home Everett was renting, forcing him to move out. Everett lived in a tent in a forest outside of Los Angeles. As of 2020, he is cancer free and living in a home in the Los Angeles area. In 2023, Everett was diagnosed with dementia.

Everett calls today's porn industry "demeaning to women" and that "it's not like the lovemaking we did in the 1970s and 1980s." He credits the Golden Age of Porn with helping a society as a whole with exploring sexuality.

== Awards ==
- 1984 XRCO Best Actor for Great Sexpectations
- 1984 XRCO Male Performer of the Year
- 1985 AVN Best Actor – Film for X Factor
- 1986 AVN Best Actor – Video for Dangerous Stuff
- 1986 AVN Best Couples Sex Scene – Video for Slumber Party
- 1986 XRCO Best Supporting Actor for Lust on the Orient Express
- 1989 XRCO Best Supporting Actor for Bodies in Heat 2
- 1990 AVN Best Couples Sex Scene – Film for Firestorm 3
- 1990 Free Speech Coalition Lifetime Achievement Award
- 1991 AVN Best Actor – Video for The Last X-rated Movie
- AVN Hall of Fame
- XRCO Hall of Fame

== Notable film appearances ==
- Debbie Does Dallas Uncovered, himself, 2005
