= Tsal =

Tsal may refer to:

- Tsal, an Arabic common name for Ziziphus zizyphus (Jujube), a plant.
- Tsal, an aspect of energy in Dzogchen.
- Tsal, or Tzul, the clan name of Georgius Tzul.
- Johnny Tsal, a sports character created by Hugh Troy, as "last" spelled backwards.
- Naama Tsal (1981–2020), an Israeli writer
- TSAL, The Soho Association Limited, in Soho, Hong Kong.
