= Griffin Campbell =

Griffin Campbell may refer to:

- Griffin Campbell, the protagonist of the Disney Channel TV series Secrets of Sulphur Springs
- Griffin Campbell, a construction contractor charged with involuntary manslaughter for his role in the 2013 Philadelphia building collapse
