= H. Allen Smith =

American journalist and writer (1907–1976)

- Born: Harry Allen Wolfgang Smith; December 19, 1907; McLeansboro, Illinois, U.S.
- Died: February 24, 1976 (aged 68); San Francisco, California, U.S.
- Occupations: Journalist; humorist
- Spouse: Nelle Mae Simpson (m. 1927)

Harry Allen Wolfgang Smith (December 19, 1907 — February 24, 1976) was an American journalist, humorist, and writer whose books were popular in the 1940s and 1950s.

== Family and early career ==
Smith was born in McLeansboro, Illinois, where he lived until the age of six. His family moved to Decatur in 1913 and then to Defiance, Ohio, finally arriving in Huntington, Indiana. It was at this point Smith dropped out of high school and began working odd jobs, eventually finding work as a journalist.

He began in 1922 at the Huntington Press, relocating to Jeffersonville, Indiana, and Louisville, Kentucky. In Florida, editing the Sebring American in 1925, he met society editor Nelle Mae Simpson, and they married in 1927. The couple lived in Oklahoma, where Smith worked at the Tulsa Tribune, followed by a position at the Denver Post. In 1929, he became a United Press rewrite man, also handling feature stories and celebrity interviews. He continued as a feature writer with the New York World-Telegram from 1934 to 1939.

== World War II bestsellers ==
He found fame when his humor book Low Man on a Totem Pole (1941) became a bestseller during World War II. It was not only popular on the home front but also read on troop trains and at military camps. Featuring an introduction by his friend Fred Allen, it eventually sold over a million copies. Damon Runyon called it, "Rich funny stuff, loaded with laughs." As noted by Eric Partridge in A Dictionary of Catch Phrases, the book's title became a catchphrase for the least successful individual in a group.

With his newfound financial freedom, he left the daily newspaper grind for life as a freelance author scripting for radio and also wrote (for six months) The Totem Pole, a daily column for United Features Syndicate; made personal appearances; and worked on his next book, Life in a Putty Knife Factory (1943), which became another bestseller. He spent eight months in Hollywood as a screenwriter for Paramount Pictures and wrote about the experience in Lost in the Horse Latitudes (1944). His first three books were widely circulated around the world in Armed Services Editions. The popularity of those titles kept Smith on the New York Herald Tribune Best Seller List for 100 weeks and prompted a collection of all three in 3 Smiths in the Wind (1946). By the end of the war, Smith's fame as a humorist was such that he edited Desert Island Decameron (1945), a collection of essays and stories by such leading humorists as Dorothy Parker, Robert Benchley and James Thurber. Histories of the Manhattan Project mention Desert Island Decameron because Donald Hornig was reading it when he was sitting in the Trinity Test tower and babysitting the atomic bomb on July 15, 1945, the stormy night prior to the first nuclear explosion.

== Later writing ==
His novel, Rhubarb (1946), about a cat that inherits a professional baseball team, led to two sequels and a 1951 film adaptation. Larks in the Popcorn (1948, reprinted in 1974) and Let The Crabgrass Grow (1960) described "rural" life in Westchester County, New York. People Named Smith (1950) offers anecdotes and histories of people named Smith, such as presidential candidate Al Smith, religious leader Joseph Smith and a man named 5/8 Smith. He collaborated with Ira L. Smith on the baseball anecdotes in Low and Inside (1949) and Three Men on Third (1951). The Compleat Practical Joker (1953, reprinted in 1980) detailed the practical jokes pulled by his friends Hugh Troy, publicist Jim Moran and other pranksters, such as the artist Waldo Peirce. His futuristic fantasy novel, The Age of the Tail (1955), describes a time when people are born with tails. One of his last books was Rude Jokes (1970).

Smith also wrote hundreds of magazine articles for Esquire, Holiday, McCall's, Playboy, Reader's Digest, The Saturday Evening Post, The Saturday Review of Literature, True, Venture, Golf Magazine and other publications. Smith made a number of appearances on radio and television. Fred Allen was one of his friends, and he was a guest on The Fred Allen Show on December 7, 1947, and January 9, 1949. On June 28, 1959, he was interviewed by Edward R. Murrow on Person to Person.

Smith's autobiography, To Hell in a Handbasket, was published in 1962. H. Allen and Nelle Smith lived in Mount Kisco, New York, for 23 years before relocating to Alpine, Texas, in 1967. He died in San Francisco, and his last book, The Life and Legend of Gene Fowler, was published posthumously in 1977. His papers are in special collections at Sul Ross State University in Alpine, Texas, and Southern Illinois University in Carbondale, Illinois. The SIU photograph collection contains pictures of Smith, his family, friends and celebrities.

== Chili champ ==
Allen competed with Wick Fowler in the first chili cookoff in history, held in Terlingua, Texas, in October 1967. The competition ended in a tie. According to his book, The Great Chili Confrontation, three judges sampled the chili. Smith and Fowler received one vote each with a third judge uttering a decision that was undiscernable to either competitors or attendees. Smith competed with the following recipe:

Get three pounds of chuck, coarse ground. Brown it in an iron kettle. (If you don't have an iron kettle you are not civilized. Go out and get one.) Chop two or three medium-sized onions and one bell pepper and add to the browned meat. Crush or mince one or two cloves of garlic and throw into the pot, then add about half a teaspoon of oregano and a quarter teaspoon of cumin seed. (You can get cumin seed in the supermarket nowadays.) Now add two small cans tomato paste; if you prefer canned tomatoes of fresh tomatoes, put them through a colander. Add about a quart of water. Salt liberally and grind in some black pepper and, for a starter, two or three tablespoons of chili powder. (Some of us use chile pods, but chile powder is just as good.) Simmer for an hour and a half or longer, then add your beans. Pinto beans are best, but if they not available, canned kidney beans will do – two 15-17 oz. cans will be adequate. Simmer another half hour. Throughout the cooking, do some testing from time to time and, as the Gourmet Cookbook puts it, "correct seasoning." When you've got it right, let it set for several hours. Later you may heat it up as much as you want and put the remainder in the refrigerator. It will taste better the second day, still better the third, and absolutely superb the fourth. You can't even begin to imagine the delights in store for you one week later.

Smith claimed to have downed the first legal drink in the United States once prohibition was repealed with the Twenty-first Amendment to the United States Constitution, and he wrote about the incident in Chapter VI of Life in a Putty Knife Factory. However, others also claimed to have taken the first Repeal drink; in New York City, Joe Weber of the comedy team Weber and Fields took the first legal drink with several reporters as his witnesses.

== Bibliography ==
- Low Man on a Totem Pole (1941)
- Life in a Putty Knife Factory (1943)
- Lost in the Horse Latitudes (1944)
- Desert Island Decameron (editor, 1945)
- Rhubarb (1946), novel
- 3 Smiths in the Wind (1946)
- Larks in the Popcorn (1948)
- Low and Inside (with Ira L. Smith, 1949)
- We Went Thataway (1949)
- People Named Smith (1950)
- Three Men on Third (with Ira L. Smith, 1951)
- Mister Zip (1952)
- Smith's London Journal (1953)
- The Compleat Practical Joker (1954)
- The Age of the Tail (1955), novel
- Lo, the Former Egyptian (1955)
- The World, The Flesh, And H. Allen Smith (1955)
- The Rebel Yell (1956)
- Write Me a Poem, Baby (1956)
- Waikiki Beachnik (1956)
- The Pig in the Barber Shop (1958)
- Don't get perconel with a chicken (1960)
- Let the Crabgrass Grow (1960)
- To Hell in a Handbasket (1962), autobiography
- Two-Thirds of a Coconut Tree (1963)
- Son of Rhubarb (1967), novel
- Buskin' with H. Allen Smith (1968)
- The Great Chili Confrontation (1969)
- Rude Jokes (1970)
- The Best of H. Allen Smith (1972)
- Return of the Virginian (1974), novel
- The Life and Legend of Gene Fowler (1977, posthumous)

== Additional sources ==
- Southern Illinois University/Morris Library Collection: Photos of H. Allen Smith (1925-76)
- Southern Illinois University/Morris Library Collection of Smith's manuscripts and papers (82 boxes)
- Sul Ross Library: Elton Miles collection with H. Allen Smith interview
