= Strange Sex =

Television series

Strange Sex (Stylized as "{strange}SEX") is a 6-part TLC documentary television series produced by Sirens Media about sexual dysfunction that premiered on July 18, 2010.

Before the 6-part (half-hour each) series, Strange Sex was an hour-long documentary that originally aired on Discovery Health on November 4, 2009, that dealt with sex allergy, sex addiction, persistent genital arousal disorder, and sexomnia.

== Episodes ==
=== Season one ===
1. "Strange Sex" (July 2010) – The series premiere profiles for individuals suffering from different sexual conditions.
2. "Cougars and Cubs" (July 18, 2010) – A 73-year-old former model, and a 33-year-old father of two go on a date.
3. "Unusual Orgasms" (July 18, 2010) – Scientists examine a woman who claims she can "think" herself to orgasm.
4. "Two Boyfriends & a Baby" (July 25, 2010) – Documenting a polyamorous relationship between a woman and two men.
5. "Uncontrollable Urges" (July 25, 2010) – Rock musician Phil Varone discusses his sex addiction.
6. "Balloon Fetish" (August 1, 2010) – A man attends a party for balloon fetishists.
7. "Pleasure and Pain" (August 1, 2010) – An embarrassing thing happens to a woman as she has sex.

=== Season two ===
1. "The Tugger & Double Trouble" (April 3, 2011) – A man attempting Foreskin restoration and a woman with uterus didelphys
2. "Secret Pain" (April 3, 2011) – A woman with vaginismus
3. "Size Matters & Gender Bender" (April 10, 2011) – Jonah Falcon and a woman with Swyer syndrome
4. "Bedroom Coach & Hidden Manhood" (April 10, 2011) – Sex surrogate and a man recovering from Fournier gangrene, which has left him with a concealed penis
5. "The More the Merrier & Surrogate Manhood" (April 17, 2011)
6. "Born Without & A Broken Man" (April 17, 2011)
7. "Right Guy Wrong Body"
8. "Manhandled & The Real 40-Year-Old Virgin?" (May 8, 2011)
9. "A Piercing Pleasure & Losing my Manhood" (May 15, 2011)
10. "Weight For It & Desperate Measures" (May 22, 2011)
