= Jonah Falcon =

American actor and television presenter (born 1970)

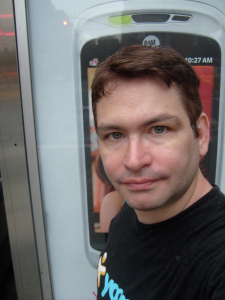
- Falcon in 2010
- Born: Jonah Adam Falcon; July 29, 1970 (age 56); Brooklyn, New York, U.S.
- Education: The Bronx High School of Science
- Occupations: Online gaming, actor, television personality, and writer
- Known for: Claiming to have the world's largest penis
- Parent(s): Joe Falcon and Cecilia Cardeli

Jonah Adam Cardeli Falcon (born July 29, 1970) is an American personality who came to international attention in 1999 because of his claim that he has the largest penis in the world, which he claims is 13.5 inches (34 cm) long when erect; Falcon has not authorized or permitted independent verification of this figure. In the years since Falcon's original fame, there are other popular claimants for the unofficial title of "world's biggest penis": Matt Barr (who claims his penis is medically verified (by a never disclosed source) to be 14.4 inches (37 cm) )) and Roberto Cabrera (though the latter was shown to be largely foreskin).

== Early life ==
Jonah Adam Julio Cardeli Falcon was born at Greenpoint Hospital in Greenpoint, Brooklyn to Cecilia Cardeli, an accountant's clerk, and Joe Falcon, a sailor who died two years after Falcon's birth. Falcon has at times claimed that his biological father was porn star John Holmes, who was famous for the size of his penis. Falcon has claimed to have documentation proving this lineage, but family members have dismissed this claim and he has failed to produce any evidence.

He recounts that when he was in fifth grade, his schoolmates saw his penis, which he says was eight inches (20 cm) long at that point, while he changed in a bathroom stall. Falcon states that he was able to perform autofellatio at the age of 10, and that at that age an older neighbor told an eighteen-year-old woman about him, and arranged for his first sexual experience with another person. At age twelve, Falcon enrolled at an East Harlem school. He reports that by the seventh grade, his penis had grown to 9.5 inches (24 cm) erect, and by age 15, it was 10.5 inches (27 cm). He later enrolled at the Bronx High School of Science, and graduated in 1988.

== Career ==
After graduating from high school, Falcon sought to become an actor and writer and enrolled in a state college to study theater. Over the next seven years, Falcon primarily socialized at nightclubs and dated casually. He said he had up to 1,500 dates by the time he was 25 and 3,000 by age 29, most of whom were females.

He often traveled to Los Angeles and Europe, where he stays with friends and "admirers", and has accepted money for sex, saying, "I took $500 from a lady on the Upper East Side to pose in my underwear for Polaroids. I've been offered $1,000 just to let someone suck it, and I'll say, 'Why not?' It's really about my ego. My ego is bigger than my sexuality." Just before turning 27, Falcon resolved to renew his pursuit of his acting aspirations, attending acting workshops and standing in line at auditions to obtain roles.

Falcon hosted an hour-long cable television call-in show devoted to the New York Yankees called Talkin' Yankees Hosted by Jonah Falcon, on MNN, a public-access cable television channel on Manhattan's Time Warner Cable. His show was relentlessly prank-called by Sal Governale and Richard Christy of The Howard Stern Show. Falcon, a frequent guest on Stern's show, released a single with Adam Barta called "It's Too Big" and performed it with Barta on the show on June 19, 2013.

When Falcon appeared on The Daily Show on March 2, 2010, Samantha Bee attempted to convince Falcon to enter the pornography industry. He refused, saying it would be "just the easy way out" and that he wished to pursue a more decent acting career. In April 2011, he appeared on the TLC documentary series {strange}SEX.

For a period, he worked as Chief Editor for the Stooge Gaming group of YouTubers.

Falcon appeared in the 2013 documentary UnHung Hero. He has appeared as an extra on TV shows such as Melrose Place, The Sopranos and Law & Order. He also appeared in an uncredited role as a mental patient in the 2001 feature film A Beautiful Mind.

Falcon has been unemployed for long periods of time.

== Anatomy ==
Falcon gained media attention after appearing in the 1999 HBO documentary Private Dicks: Men Exposed (filmed by Meema Spadola and Thom Powers), in which 25 males were interviewed in the nude about their penises. Rolling Stone published an article in 2003 that reported Falcon's penis as measuring 9.5 inches (24 cm) in length when flaccid and 13.5 inches (34 cm) in length when erect.

When becoming and being erect, Falcon claims a large amount of blood flows to his penis causes lightheadedness. In January 2006, Falcon appeared in a documentary by UK Channel 4 called The World's Biggest Penis. Falcon appeared on The Daily Show on March 2, 2010, and stated that he can completely envelop a doorknob with his foreskin.

In 2014, Falcon agreed to donate his penis to the Icelandic Phallological Museum (The Penis Museum) after his death.

== Personal life ==
Falcon sometimes lives with his mother in New York City, in between jobs. In a 2003 interview, Falcon stated that his longest romantic relationship with a woman lasted for one year. When interviewed by Out magazine, he identified his sexual orientation as bisexual.

Falcon is an only child and grew up in a four-story house in Brooklyn with a large extended family including cousins, aunts, uncles, grandparents and great-grandparents. Falcon lived with his grandmother in Puerto Rico for three years between the age of six and nine before moving back to New York City.

== See also ==
- Human penis size
