= Vox Pop (radio) =

Radio show (1932–1948)

On the Vox Pop program for February 4, 1939, publicist Jim Moran was interviewed by Parks Johnson and Wally Butterworth as he prepared to throw eggs at an electric fan.

Vox Pop is a popular radio program of interviews, quizzes and human-interest features, sometimes titled Sidewalk Interviews (1936) and Voice of the People (the name is from the Latin "Vox Populi", meaning "Voice of the People"). It was heard from the early 1930s to the late 1940s.

The program was launched in 1932 on KTRH in Houston when advertising salesmen Parks Johnson and Jerry Belcher went into the street with portable microphones to talk to people about the 1932 presidential race between Herbert Hoover and FDR.

They continued after the election, and as they developed the premise into a series, it expanded on the Southwest Broadcasting System. Three years later, Johnson and Belcher moved the show to New York, and were heard on the Blue Network in 1935 as a summer replacement for Joe Penner. On October 13, 1935, they became part of the regular NBC schedule with Belcher replaced by Wally Butterworth in 1936.

They remained on NBC until 1939, when they jumped to CBS. Butterworth was replaced by Neil O'Malley in 1942, and O'Malley was later replaced by Warren Hull.

The series came to an end on ABC in 1947–48. Between November 7, 1932, and May 19, 1948, Parks Johnson and his co-hosts visited 41 states and six foreign countries.

Today, Vox Pop is the name of an unrelated live call-in radio show on WAMC (Northeast Public Radio).

== Merchandising ==
In the 1938 Milton Bradley game, Vox Pop, players pulled chips from a bag to answer questions on a host's card. The game box cover displayed a yellow lightning bolt on a blue field. The box cover of a later edition (titled The New Vox Pop on the question cards) showed Johnson and Butterworth set against a New York skyline.
