= Ric Mancini =

American film and television actor

- Mancini in Friday the 13th: A New Beginning, 1985
- Born: Enrico P. Mancini; April 16, 1933; New York, U.S.
- Died: May 26, 2006 (aged 73); Woodland Hills, California, U.S.
- Occupations: Film and television actor
- Spouse: Marilyn Chris (m. 1967; div. 1975)

Enrico P. Mancini (April 16, 1933 – May 26, 2006) was an American film and television actor. He was best known for playing Mayor Cobb in the 1985 film Friday the 13th: A New Beginning.

== Career ==
Mancini began his stage career in the 1960s, and in 1964, he played Marco in a production of the play A View from the Bridge. He then began his screen career in 1970, appearing in the NBC police drama television series McCloud. In the same year, he appeared in the television programs The Interns and Dan August. During his screen career, he appeared in commercials.

Later in his career, Mancini guest-starred in numerous television programs The Rockford Files, M*A*S*H, Charlie's Angels, Trapper John, M.D., Remington Steele, Laverne & Shirley, Who's the Boss?, Rhoda, The Bob Newhart Show, Quantum Leap and The A-Team. In 1985, he played Mayor Cobb in the film Friday the 13th: A New Beginning. He also appeared in films such as They Call Me Bruce?, Deep Cover, Ed Wood, Across 110th Street, Ghostbusters, Starsky & Hutch, Nickelodeon and Teenage Hitchhikers.

Mancini retired from acting in 2002, last appearing in the CBS soap opera television series The Bold and the Beautiful.

== Death ==
Mancini died on May 26, 2006, at the Motion Picture & Television Fund cottages in Woodland Hills, California, at the age of 73.
