= Private Dicks: Men Exposed =

Documentary

- Directed by: Thom Powers; Meema Spadola
- Starring: Alan Abel; Jonah Falcon; Calvin Lom; Lexington Steele; Jesse Sheidlower
- Theme music composer: Stephan Crump; John M. Davis; John Mettam; Andrew Ramsey
- Country of origin: United States
- No. of episodes: 1

Production
- Producers: Jacqueline Glover; Sheila Nevins; Thom Powers; Ann Rose; Meema Spadola
- Running time: 58 min

Original release
- Network: HBO
- Release: March 15, 1999

Private Dicks: Men Exposed is a 1999 American HBO TV documentary on the human penis. The film was directed by Thom Powers and Meema Spadola who previously made HBO's 1996 Breasts: A Documentary, a similar documentary on the breast.

== Plot ==
The 58-minute documentary features 25 men with age ranging from young to old, and who work in a variety of professions, some of whom are professional performers. A mix of heterosexual, homosexual and bisexual men, along with two transgender individuals, were interviewed. They were interviewed nude on a variety of topics related to their genitals and sexuality, including first sexual experience, frequency of masturbation, penis size, oral sex, libido, sexual performance, and sexually transmitted diseases.

== Hoax ==
One of the people featured in the documentary, a 57-year-old musician by the name of "Bruce", was featured heavily as having an extremely small member that he claimed was "the smallest in the world. One inch, erect." "Bruce" was later revealed to be professional prankster Alan Abel. HBO decided against removing Abel from the documentary and later versions of the documentary labeled him as a professional hoaxer.

== Reception ==
Ken Tucker of Entertainment Weekly described the film as "alternately funny and quite literally touching". Eric Mink of New York Daily News calls the film "insightful" and "funny".

Kam Williams reviewing the DVD in AALBC.com described the film as "excellent". He notes, "The directors were clever enough to contrast all this graphic present-day content intermittently with some tame file footage from stock Sexual Education films which probably passed as state-of-the-art instruction back in the Fifties." According to him, these interludes, which he labels as "antiseptic", "humorous", and "amusing", are "a welcome reminder of how far we've come from the days of learning about the birds and the bees in clinical presentations by a nervous nerd in a white lab coat standing in front of a blackboard with a pointer." MaryAnn Johanson, writing in Flick Filosopher, asserts that it is the openness of the interviewees, not the nudity, which is significant.
