= Teenage Hitchhikers =

- Theatrical release poster
- Directed by: Jerome S. Kaufman (as Gerri Sedley)
- Written by: Jerome S. Kaufman (as Rod Whipple)
- Produced by: Jerome S. Kaufman; Morton J. Gains
- Starring: Kathie Christopher; Sandra Peabody; Nikki Lynn
- Edited by: Marc Menahem
- Music by: Victor Paul
- Distributed by: Tower Film Co.
- Release date: June 1, 1975
- Running time: 74 minutes
- Country: United States
- Language: English

Teenage Hitchhikers is a 1975 American sex comedy written, directed, and produced by Jerome S. Kaufmann. Kathie Christopher and Sandra Peabody star as Mouse and Bird, two teenage girls who embark on a journey West in search of freedom, excitement, and independence.

Cinematographer Bill Lamond signed on to the project after being approached by Kaufmann to work on the film. Kaufmann and Lamond worked at the same television advertisement company. Production began in September 1973 for a week on a low budget of $15k. It was released into drive-in theaters in 1974 to generally favorable reviews that highlight the comedic timing of Christopher and Peabody and the film's social commentary.

The film is one of filmmaker Quentin Tarantino's favorite films and got included in the sixth semi-annual lineup of his Quentin Tarantino Film Festival in 2005 in Austin, Texas.

== Plot ==
Mouse and Bird are struggling to find assistance in traveling west in an attempt to start a new life. After several failed attempts at hitchhiking, a rock band traveling with a pair of groupies in a recreational vehicle pulls over and allows the girls inside. After the band performs a song, they state that they will not provide them with transportation unless the duo agree to have sexual intercourse with them. They immediately decline as they refuse to be objectified. Thus, Mouse and Bird are kicked out of the vehicle.

After traveling across the highway, the girls approach a river where Bird unintentionally catches a trout in her underwear. Having gone days without food due to not having any money, they perform a brief striptease in a nearby diner in an attempt to get their meal paid for by a middle aged customer but to no avail. Not wanting to be victimized, Mouse and Bird decide that they need to be the ones taking advantage of people in their predicaments in order to obtain money.

Subsequently, they hear reports of an escaped rapist and are told not to hitch-hike. In the woods, the rapist from the news reports attempts to assault a young girl named Jennie. Mouse and Bird devise a plan to save her and tie the rapist up. Jennie decides to join them with their travels. Upon buying a car with money they obtained, the girls soon find themselves involved in an orgy. The next morning, they find their purses and car stolen and realize they are in the same dire predicament they started out in.

== Cast ==
- Kathie Christopher as Mouse
- Sandra Peabody as Bird
- Claire Wilbur as Toni Blake
- Nikki Lynn as Jennie
- Margaret Whitton as Sola Alcoa (credited as Peggy Whitton)
- Peter Carew as Dick Daggart (Boutique Owner)
- Kevin Andre as Farquart (Bruce)
- Donald Haines as Kiely / Mongo Donny
- Ric Mancini as Rapist
- Bill La Mond as Chauffeur

== Production ==
Sedley and cinematographer Bill Lamond were working in the television advertisement industry. This industry is where the two met each other while working for the same company. Sedley approached Lamond for the project, and he signed on. Filming took place over a week in September 1973 in Greene County, New York, on a low-budget of $15k. Filming took place at four different locations within the area. Both Sedley and Lamond recollects filming as challenging due to the temperature (as the film got shot on live locations.) A deal got made between the filmmakers and actors auditioning; actors would be paid half before the film's release and receive the other half of payment after releasing into drive-ins and theaters. Sedley approached several talent agents who brought actors to read for the project like Peabody, Jordan, Lynn, and Mancini—he liked Peabody, describing her as being the "smartest one," of the cast. He also enjoyed working with Mancini, recollecting him as being very interesting. The actors came in to read for the script, and if their reading impressed Sedley, he hired them. The cast and crew stayed at a motel in Upstate New York that Sedley knew of—the motel accommodated and provided food for them.

== Reception ==
Teenage Hitchhikers received generally moderate reviews, with particular praise for the leading performances of Christopher and Peabody. The script has received a more divisive reception, with some critics describing it as being feminist-oriented and empowering, while others have criticized it for being exploitative. In a mixed review for Los Angeles Times, critic Linda Gross criticized the storyline of the film, stating that it is set up as a parody film but succumbs to the exploitation elements. Gross highlighted parts of the script as being "funny and farcical." Gross noted similarities between Mouse and Bird and the teenage girls in the comedy film The World of Henry Orient (1974) and praised the lead performances of Christopher and Peabody, stating they "are ingenious as the juvenile adventuresses." Writing for Bristol Post, Patrick Fleet awarded the film two stars out of four, stating Christopher and Peabody are "two absolute charmers."

Conversely, Andrew Reschke of Syracuse Herald-Journal gave the film a negative review, describing the film as "one prolonged off-colored joke," criticizing the dialogue, performances of Christopher and Peabody, and the use of sexploitation. In a complimentary review, Ian Jane of DVD Talk praised the lead performances and the storyline of the film for capturing its era but was critical of certain scenes lasting too long.

Loron Hays of Reel Reviews wrote that the film "works best when it subverts the genre of sex comedies" and places the women in an empowering position. Hays highlights the chemistry between Jordan and Peabody, the eccentric characters, the screwball comedy, and the film's social commentary.
