= UnHung Hero =

- Directed by: Brian Spitz
- Starring: Patrick Moote; Jonah Falcon; Dan Savage
- Cinematography: Brennan Maxwell
- Music by: Sarah Schachner
- Distributed by: Showtime
- Release date: March 8, 2013 (SXSW)
- Country: United States
- Language: English

UnHung Hero is a 2013 documentary directed by Brian Spitz and starring Patrick Moote.

The film premiered at South by Southwest in 2013 and is available on demand on Showtime.

== Summary ==
Patrick Moote very publicly proposes to his girlfriend – while being shown on the jumbotron screen at a UCLA basketball game – and she refuses his proposal. A video clip of the failed proposal ends up on YouTube and gets millions of views. She later says that one reason for rejecting his proposal is because his penis is too small. Moote then travels the world to find out if size really matters.

== Patrick Moote ==
Patrick Moote (born August 17, 1983) is a documentarian. Moote was hailed as an "affable hero" in the film, which was called "a lighthearted romp with laughs" by The Huffington Post and "laugh-out-loud funny" by the Los Angeles Times, also garnering praise from Michael Moore.

On May 20, 2018, Moote was diagnosed with colon cancer, so he opened a GoFundMe account to help pay for his treatment.
