= Society for Indecency to Naked Animals =

Hoax concocted by Alan Abel

The Society for Indecency to Naked Animals, or SINA, was a satirical hoax concocted by serial prankster Alan Abel. The group used the language and rhetoric of conservative moralists for the ostensible aim of clothing "indecent" naked animals, including domestic pets, barnyard animals, and large wildlife.

The society and its aims were then largely presented in the public arena on news and talk shows by comedian/improviser Buck Henry (in the guise of SINA president "G. Clifford Prout") from 1959 through 1963.

== History ==
In 1959, Alan Abel wrote a satirical story about an imaginary organization for The Saturday Evening Post but the editors rejected it. Abel then transformed his story into a series of press releases from the organization that garnered media attention. Looking to expand the range and impact of the hoax, Abel persuaded the actor Buck Henry to assume the role of the group president, G. Clifford Prout, Jr., in U.S. television news and talk show appearances.

Henry, who had improv training, was able to play Prout with an intense deadpan sincerity, as well as to stay in character through unscripted interviews. During the interviews, Prout was often presented as an amusing eccentric, but was otherwise taken seriously by the broadcasters who interviewed him. Abel (seen far less frequently) played the group's executive vice-president Bruce Spencer.

Over time, the history of SINA and some of its specific aims were codified into a coherent (if unlikely) backstory. The group had been founded some years before by G. Clifford Prout, Sr., and was being carried on by his son.

An alleged debate within SINA was how large an animal had to be to require clothing; the official position quoted by Prout was "any dog, cat, horse or cow that stands higher than 4 inches or longer than 6 inches." Slogans such as "Decency today means morality tomorrow" and "A nude horse is a rude horse" were offered.

The group received widespread American media coverage, beginning with an appearance by G. Clifford Prout on NBC's Today Show on May 27, 1959. Press releases and media appearances continued for the next few years, until the hoax was finally revealed in late 1962.

== Support and anthems ==
There was no membership fee to join SINA, as the official society policy for membership stated that "you must only demonstrate a desire to be decent by clothing your animals, and in some instances those of your neighbors." Headquarters were at 507 Fifth Avenue, New York, New York, a real address which Abel used to receive SINA mail.

Some letters were from people looking to subscribe to SINA's occasional newsletter; others were from potential newsletter contributors, as the organization also sponsored mail-in essay-writing contests such as "Why I Choose To Be A Decent Person." SINA also (falsely) claimed to have branch offices in London, Chicago, St. Louis and San Francisco.

SINA actually acquired ardent supporters, some of whom attempted to contribute a great deal of money to the organization. The money was invariably returned, as neither Abel nor Henry wished to be charged with mail fraud by accepting donations for a bogus charity.

In public appearances (and in letters accompanying returned money or checks), "Prout" was careful to note that the by-laws of SINA prevented him from accepting donations, as he was independently wealthy and financed the operation through his own private means. He therefore did not require financial assistance.

Nevertheless, the letters of support and offers of money aided SINA's (false) claims of gaining momentum; at one time they claimed tens of thousands of members. They published a newsletter, in an issue of which is this anthem:

High on the wings of SINA / we fight for the future now;
Let's clothe every pet and animal / whether dog, cat, horse or cow!
G. Clifford Prout, our President / he works for you and me,
So clothe all your pets and join the march / for worldwide Decency!
S.I.N.A., that's our call / all for one and one for all.
Hoist our flag for all to see / waving for Morality.
Onward we strive together / stronger in every way,
All mankind and his animal friends / for SINA, S-I-N-A!

At least one LP record, Inside SINA, was released in 1964. By this time, the hoax had been exposed, and Henry was no longer affiliated with the project. The record contained interview material with "Bruce Spencer" (i.e., Abel); G. Clifford Prout was frequently referenced in the liner notes and spoken material, but did not make an appearance. The album contains several SINA-related anthems and songs, and a Q&A feature detailing SINA and its aims.

== Exposure ==
The hoax was exposed when staff on Walter Cronkite's CBS television news show recognized Buck Henry while broadcasting an interview of "G. Clifford Prout" by Cronkite. (Henry was known to some of the crew, as he was working for CBS at the time, albeit in another department.) The interview was broadcast on August 21, 1962, and Abel noted: "When Cronkite eventually found out that he’d been conned, and I was the guy behind it, he called me up. I’d never heard him that angry on TV—not about Hitler, Saddam Hussein, or Fidel Castro. He was furious with me."

A 1963 Time article formally exposed the hoax. Abel managed to keep the newsletter going for several more years, as not everyone had seen or heard of that Cronkite episode or read the Time article — however, numerous subscribers knew it was a hoax by this point, but simply enjoyed the humor of the newsletter.

The Society for Indecency to Naked Animals hoax was chronicled in Abel's book, The Great American Hoax, published in 1966.

== Films ==
- Abel Raises Cain
- No More Excuses
