= Alan Abel =

American hoaxer (1924–2018)

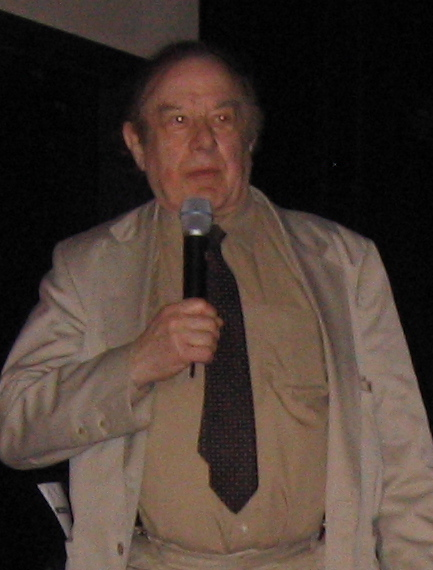
- Abel in 2005
- Born: Alan Irwin Abel; August 2, 1924; Zanesville, Ohio, U.S.
- Died: September 14, 2018 (aged 94); Southbury, Connecticut, U.S.
- Education: Ohio State University
- Spouse: Jeanne
- Children: 1

Alan Irwin Abel (August 2, 1924 – September 14, 2018) was an American hoaxer, writer, and mockumentary filmmaker famous for several hoaxes that became media circuses.

== Education and early career ==
Abel was born to a Jewish family in Zanesville, Ohio, on August 2, 1924, and grew up in nearby Coshocton, Ohio. He graduated from the Ohio State University with a Bachelor of Science in education. One of Abel's earliest pranks took place in the late 1950s; he posed as a golf professional who taught Westinghouse executives how to use ballet positions to improve their games.

Beginning May 27, 1959, with a story on the Today Show, the Society for Indecency to Naked Animals (SINA), was Abel's most elaborate hoax. SINA's mission was to clothe naked animals throughout the world. They are best known today for their tagline: "A nude horse is a rude horse". As a spokesman for the group, Buck Henry appeared as "G. Clifford Prout" on television and radio several times, including the CBS Evening News on August 21, 1962. Abel himself appeared on The Mike Douglas Show to discuss the SINA mission. The hoax began as a satire of media censorship, but took on a life of its own with sympathizers offering unsolicited contributions (always returned), citizen summonses for walking naked dogs, and sewing patterns for pet clothes. He orchestrated protests, such as picketing the White House in 1963 to demand Jackie Kennedy's horses wear pants.

He invented a fictional housewife named Yetta Bronstein who ran as a write-in candidate for president of the United States in both 1964 and 1968. A member of "The Best Party", Bronstein ran with the slogan "Vote for Yetta and things will get betta" and a platform which included National Bingo and a suggestion box in front of the White House. Alan Abel and his wife Jeanne both performed as Bronstein for phone interviews, and a photo of his mother was used as the face on campaign posters.

From 1966 to 1967, Abel wrote a weekly syndicated humor column "The Private World of Prof. Bunker C. Hill" that appeared in the San Francisco Chronicle and several other newspapers.

== 1970s–1980s ==
Following the Watergate scandal, Abel hired an actor to pose as Deep Throat for a press conference in New York City before 150 reporters. Literary agent Scott Meredith offered $100,000 to buy the rights to his story. At the news conference, the Deep Throat impostor quarreled with his purported wife, then fainted and was whisked away in a waiting ambulance.

In the early 1970s, Abel appeared on the game show To Tell the Truth with his head wrapped in bandages. This was not so that he would not be recognized, but so the panel would not identify his two imposters: well-known actors Larry Blyden and Tom Poston.

Abel wrote, produced, and directed two mockumentaries: Is There Sex After Death? (1971) and The Faking of the President (1976).

Amid the economic recession of the 1970s, he announced Omar's School for Beggars to train professional panhandlers. As Omar, Abel was invited to numerous television talk shows, including the Tomorrow Show hosted by Tom Snyder and the shows of Morton Downey Jr., Sally Jessy Raphael, Mike Douglas, and Sonya Friedman, who was especially upset because Omar ate his lunch on camera. The hoax was a satirical commentary on the rise of unemployment and homelessness in the U.S. Omar's TV appearances spanned from 1975 to 1988, though he had been exposed several times.

In 1980, Abel staged his own death from a heart attack near the Sundance Ski Lodge. A fake funeral director collected his belongings, and a woman posing as his widow notified The New York Times. The paper published an obituary on January 2, 1980, asserting he had died the day before. On January 3, Abel held a news conference to announce, "[the] reports of my demise have been grossly exaggerated", a reference to the similar statement by Mark Twain. It was the first retracted obituary in New York Times history.

=== Mass fainting hoax ===
On January 21, 1985, on the first program that The Phil Donahue Show aired live and in New York, seven members of the audience appeared to faint. Donahue, worried the studio was overheated or that the setting was inducing excessive anxiety, cleared the studio and resumed the show without an audience. The fainting "spell" was orchestrated by Abel, who later said that Phil Donahue enjoyed high ratings after the incident and sent Abel a Christmas card with the message, "Hope nothing causes you to feel faint in the next year."

== Parodies ==
In 1993, when euthanasia and Jack Kevorkian were common topics in the news, Abel set up the bogus Florida company "Euthanasia Cruises, Ltd.", which would offer cruises allowing terminally ill participants to jump into the ocean after three days of partying. He revived this hoax in a column in 2006.

In 1997, Abel launched CGS Productions to promote gift-wrapped pint jars of Jenny McCarthy's urine. (A parody of McCarthy's role in a shoe commercial where she appeared sitting on a toilet.) The name of the communications director for CGS Productions was Stoidi Puekaw – "wake up idiots" backwards.

Abel once ran for Congress on a platform that included paying congressmen based on commission; selling ambassadorships to the highest bidder; installing a lie detector in the White House and truth serum in the Senate drinking fountain; requiring all doctors to publish their medical-school grade point average in the telephone book after their names; and removing Wednesday to establish a four-day workweek.

== Later years ==
In 1994 he appeared on The Jenny Jones Show to tell a fabricated story about his wife gluing his penis to his butt while he was asleep.

In 1999, Abel appeared in the documentary Private Dicks: Men Exposed, in which he claimed to be the current holder of the Guinness World Record for the smallest penis. Abel, who initially appeared in the video as "Bruce the musician" (later versions of the documentary changed this to reflect that Abel was a prankster), did not disrobe for the documentary crew, and said that he would only do so if they were to have group sex afterwards. Abel stated, "They said no. So I didn't have to take off my shorts."

At the 2000 Republican National Convention in Philadelphia, Abel introduced a Citizens Against Breastfeeding campaign to ban all breastfeeding because "it is an incestuous relationship between mother and baby that manifests an oral addiction leading youngsters to smoke, drink, and even becoming antisocial." He said in an interview that he attracted supporters, including one woman from Santa Barbara mailed him a $40,000 check, which he returned. After 200 interviews over two years, Abel confessed the hoax in U.S. News & World Report.

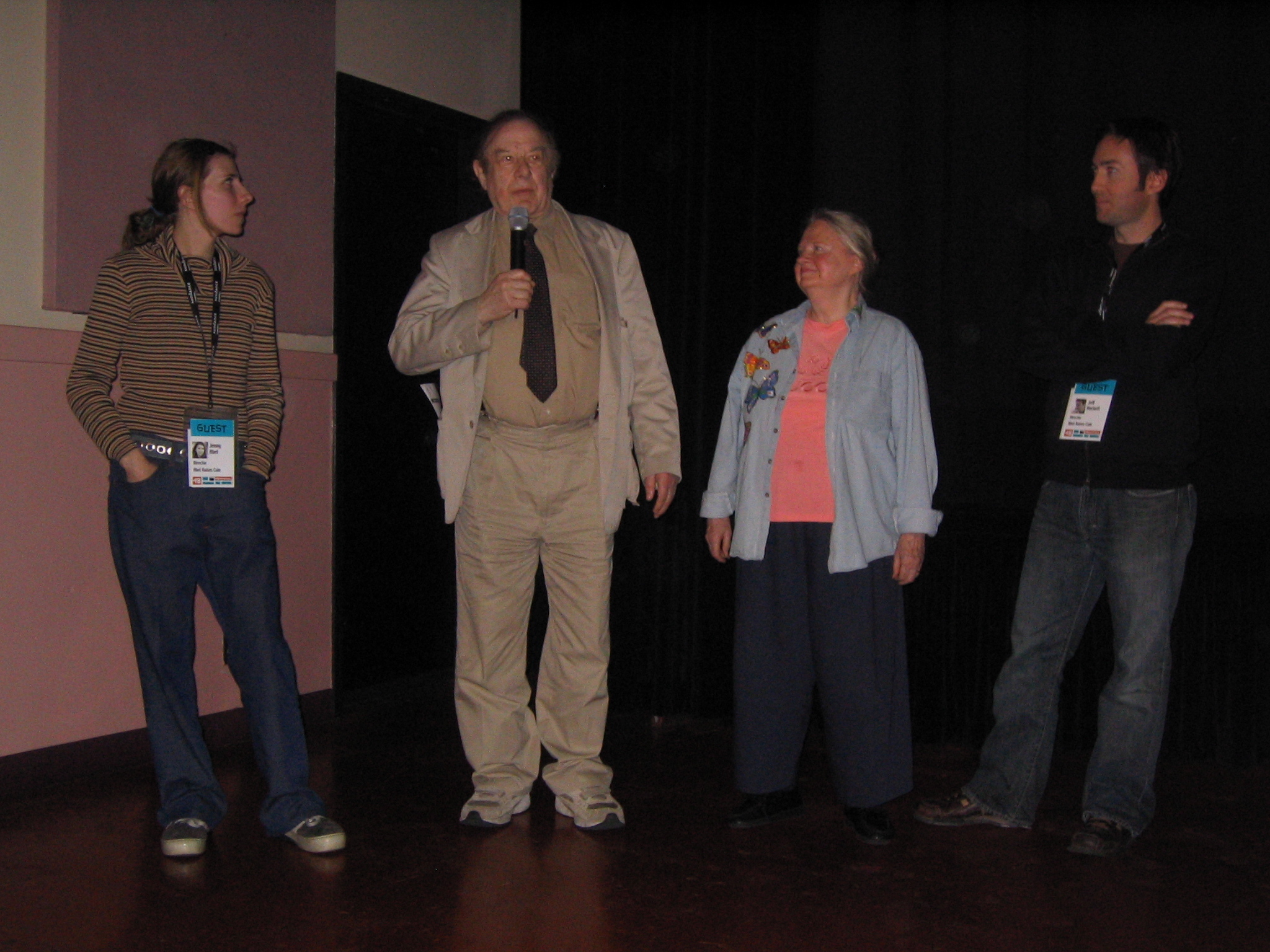
Abel (second from left) with his daughter Jenny (left), his wife Jeanne, and Jeff Hockett at the San Francisco International Film Festival, April 2005.

In 2006, an Esquire profile by Joshua Foer described a "fat tax" campaign spearheaded by Abel (under the name Irwin Leba). He proposed heavy taxes on the obese in order to balance the federal budget, and was described in Esquire as a reclusive and surprisingly heavy Texas multi-millionaire who earned his wealth by working his way up the New York City hot dog stand ladder, moving to Texas, and investing his savings into McDonald's stock. In the interview, Abel devoured French fries and extolled deep-fried Twinkies.

Abel died on September 14, 2018, at his home in Southbury, Connecticut, from complications of cancer and heart failure; he was 94. Owing to Abel's previous death hoax, The New York Times sought independent confirmation of his death from his family, a hospice organization, and a local funeral home before publishing an obituary.

== Documentary ==
In 2004, his daughter Jenny Abel, along with Jeff Hockett, made a documentary film of Abel's life called Abel Raises Cain, which played at the Boston Independent Film Festival and the 2005 Slamdance Film Festival, where it won first prize for Best Documentary. It has been released on DVD.

== Books ==
- The Great American Hoax (1966)
- The President I Almost Was by "Mrs. Yetta Bronstein" (Abel and his wife) (1966)
- Confessions of a Hoaxer (1970, Macmillan)
- The Fallacy of Creative Thinking (as Bruce Spencer, 1972)
- The Panhandlers Handbook (as Omar the Beggar, 1977)
- Don't Get Mad, Get Even (1983, Sidg. & J)
- How to Thrive on Rejection (1983, W W Norton & Co Ltd, as W. W. Norton)

== See also ==
- Horace de Vere Cole
- Joey Skaggs, a more recent performer of media hoaxes including Cathouse for Dogs (1976)
