= Snake in the Monkey's Shadow =

- Directed by: Cheung Sum
- Produced by: Alex Gouw
- Starring: John Cheung Ng-long; Wilson Tong Wai-shing; Charlie Chan Yiu-lam
- Cinematography: Fan Chuan-lin
- Music by: Chow Fook-liang
- Distributed by: Goldig Films LTD.
- Release date: 1979
- Running time: 100 min.
- Country: Hong Kong
- Language: Mandarin
- Box office: $1.4 million

Snake in the Monkey's Shadow (a.k.a. Hou hsing kou shou a.k.a. Snake Fist vs. the Dragon) is a Hong Kong martial arts film made in 1979 and directed by Cheung Sum. It stars John Cheung Ng-Long, Wilson Tong Wai-Shing and Charlie Chan Yiu-lam.

== Plot ==
The story begins with a voiceover saying when the snake style of kung fu was at its peak a vicious fighter by the name of Hsia Sa was one of the greatest exponents of the style. The snake style can be a vicious style and Hsia Sa was a vicious fighter and had an ambition to dominate the fighting world and had killed many experts until one day he challenged a monkey style expert called Koo Ting-sang and they held a contest. As Hsia Sa is walking through a jungle he sees Koo Ting-sang appear from nowhere and jump tree from tree until he lands on the ground and demands why Hsia Sa has challenged him saying he wants to kill him. Hsia Sa says he is right and today he will die. Koo Ting-sang shocked by Hsia Sa words says he is conceited about his style and also remarks that while Hsia Sa snake style is great his monkey style can kill snakes and engages him in a lengthy fight and defeats and badly injures Hsia Sa. Although he could easily kill him Koo Ting-sang spares Hsia Sa life and Hsia Sa remarks that if Koo Ting-sang doesn't kill him now he will regret it however Koo Ting-sang laughs of his threat saying if he can beat him once he can do it again and Hsia Sa staggers away.

The story then revolves around Lung, a poor, young fishmonger who aspires to learn kung-fu. After a late delivery of fish to the local, wealthy Yan family he is subjected to a savage and humiliating assault by two of Yan's sons. Although Lung's interest in kung-fu was limited to spying on a local school, this incident forces him to approach Teacher Ho, the Drunken-style kung-fu expert who runs the school. In spite of his plea for a place at the school Ho is adamant that the school is full. In order to get rid of Lung, the teacher tricks him into getting drunk resulting in Lung passing out. Lung awakes to find himself in the country-side faced with the presence of a deadly cobra. Enter Koo Ting-sang, a Monkey-form kung-fu expert, who saves Lung from the life-threatening predicament.

Lung returns to Ho and manages to talk his way into getting a place at the school, but only as a 'cleaner-up.' One day, Teacher Ho catches his students ganging up on Lung and, impressed by Lung's courage, gives him a place as a student. Lung pays a visit to Koo Ting-sang with a gift in acknowledgment of Koo's earlier favour; in turn Koo offers Lung tuition in Monkey-style, however upon learning that his would-be teacher is in fact a real monkey, Lung declines the offer. Instead, Lung shows off his newly acquired Drunken-style skill to Koo Ting-sang by taking revenge on the Yan brothers who have conveniently arrived to take control of Koo's land. A result of this revenge is for the Yan family to complain to Teacher Ho directly. Whilst Ho doesn't appreciate the attention brought about by his student's actions, he is less pleased about the Yan family's arrogant manner and a brawl ensues resulting in the Yan family returning home, beaten and humiliated. Whilst licking their wounds, the father is informed by an aide that two Snake-style experts happen to be passing through the area and so he summons them to assassinate Teacher Ho.

Lung arrives at the school to find Ho being attacked by the Snake-stylists, Hsia Sa and his partner. Despite helping his teacher the assassins defeat them both and kill Teacher Ho. Barely conscious, Lung staggers to Koo Ting-sang to describe what happened. Koo Ting-sang realises that he fought and defeated one of the Snake-style experts in the opening sequence to the movie and that they could be after him as revenge. Indeed, this turns out to be true and Koo Ting-sang, who could handle one "snake," is defeated by the combined power of two.

Lung, determined to avenge the death of Ho and Koo, constructs a training ground to develop his technique further. The viewer is taken through a prolonged scene involving Lung balancing upon pots and the use of an elaborate rotating wooden dummy, as well as a pivotal scene of Koo's master, a monkey, killing a snake. This sight gives Lung the idea of mixing some Monkey-style with his Drunken technique.

The final fight between Lung and the two Snake-style experts takes place on an open, grassy terrain. Lung symbolically bites the hand of his opponent, mimicking the way Koo's monkey killed the snake, and after a long and arduous fight Lung defeats and kills both experts and avenges Teacher Ho and Koo Ting-Sang

== Cast ==
- John Cheung Ng Long as Lung
- Wilson Tong Wai Shing as Lun Chun (Snake-stylist #2)
- Charlie Chan Yiu Lam as Hsia Sa (Snake-stylist #1)
- Pomson Shi as Koo Ting-sang
- Hau Chiu Sing as Teacher Ho
- Tong Tin Hei as Yan Fung Tien (Yan father)
- Wan Faat as Hao Long (Yan brother #1 with blue clothes)
- Cheng Hong Yip as Yan brother #2 with red clothes
- Ching Chu
- Tsang Choh Lam

== Themes ==
Various kung-fu styles are presented in the movie. Although styles with similar names are practiced in real-life, often the film presents its own take on each.
