= 2013 Philadelphia building collapse =

Building collapse in Philadelphia, United States of America

Philadelphia Salvation Army Building Collapse
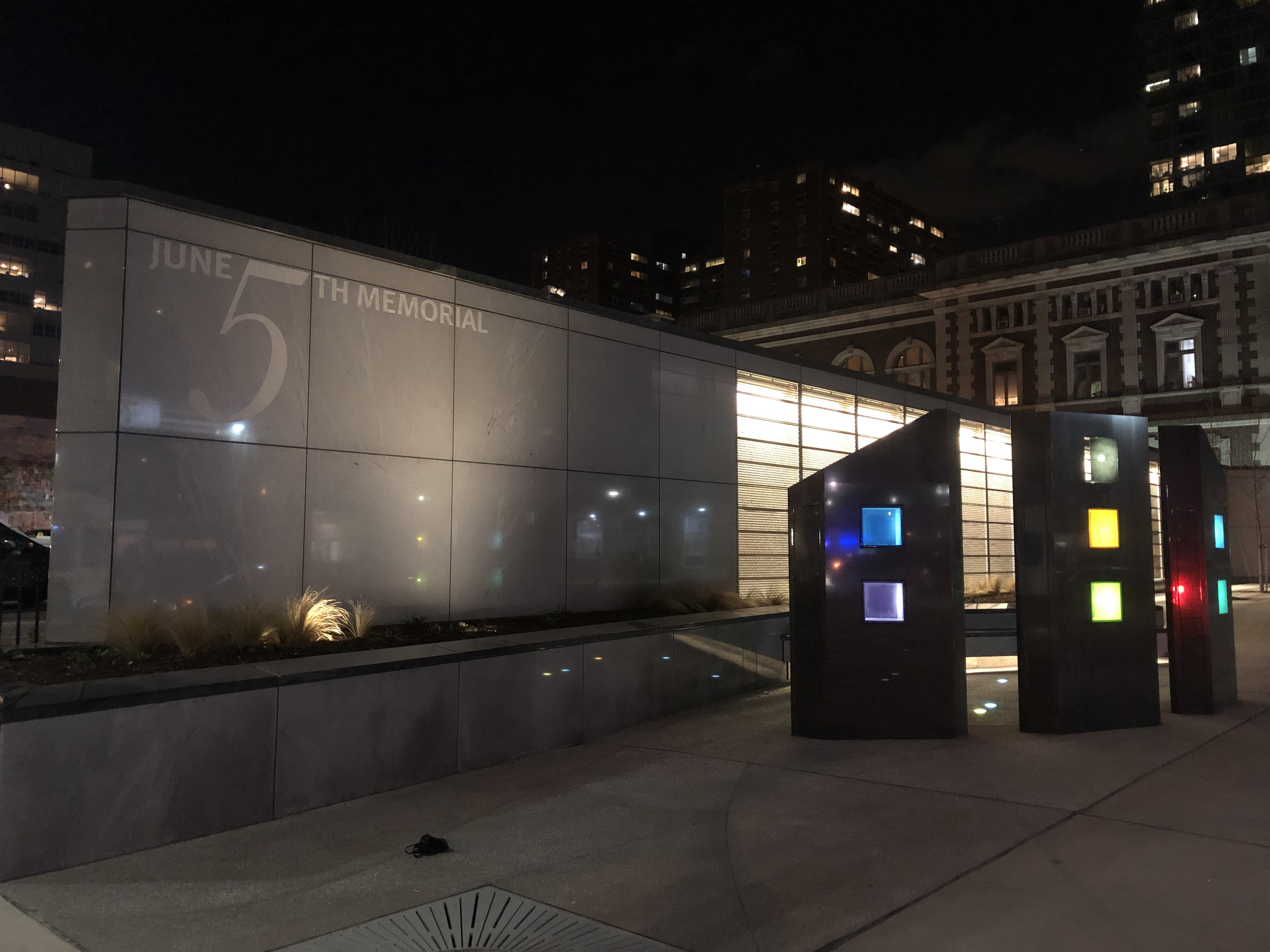
- The memorial to the disaster in April 2019
- Date: June 5, 2013
- Time: 10:43 am EST
- Location: 2140 Market Street, Philadelphia, Pennsylvania, U.S.; 39.9537°N 75.1766°W
- Cause: Botched demolition of adjacent building
- Deaths: 6
- Injuries: 14
- Accused: Griffin Campbell, Sean Benschop
- Charges: Third-degree murder and involuntary manslaughter (six counts); Reckless endangerment (six counts); Criminal conspiracy Risking catastrophe and causing catastrophe
- Convictions: Guilty of involuntary manslaughter

On June 5, 2013, a building undergoing demolition collapsed onto the neighboring Salvation Army Thrift Store at the southeast corner of 22nd and Market streets in Center City Philadelphia, trapping a number of people under the rubble. The store was open and full of shoppers and staff. Seven people died and fourteen others were injured in the incident.

The construction contractor, Griffin Campbell, and the building's excavator operator, Sean Benschop, were subsequently charged with involuntary manslaughter and other charges. They were found guilty of manslaughter, and Campbell and Benschop received prison sentences of 15 to 30 years, and 7.5 to 15 years, respectively.

== Background ==
2138 Market Street, an unoccupied four-story building, had been under demolition by Griffin Campbell Construction for several weeks prior to the collapse. This property is owned by Richard Basciano through his development corporation, STB Investments. 2138 Market was adjacent to the one-story 2140 Market Street building, which had a Salvation Army thrift store operating on the ground and basement levels. The store was open and full of shoppers and staff.

On May 31, 2013, the property manager for STB, Thom Simmonds, emailed Plato Marinakos, an architect for STB, stating that Basciano visited that day and noticed no one was working. He indicated that Basciano would visit the site again that weekend and asked Marinakos to advise. The emails indicated that Basciano returned to the site on June 2 and was pleased to see progress. An 18-ton motorized excavator had been moved on to the site. After being granted immunity by the grand jury, Marinakos testified that on June 4, Griffin Campbell called for a progress payment. Marinakos then went to the site at 6 p.m. on June 4 and was alarmed to see an unsupported brick wall looming next to the Salvation Army building. Marinakos then testified that he told Campbell to take the wall down immediately, "I was like, 'Griffin, you can't leave this wall here. This is just crazy. I mean, you can't do that.'"

== Collapse ==
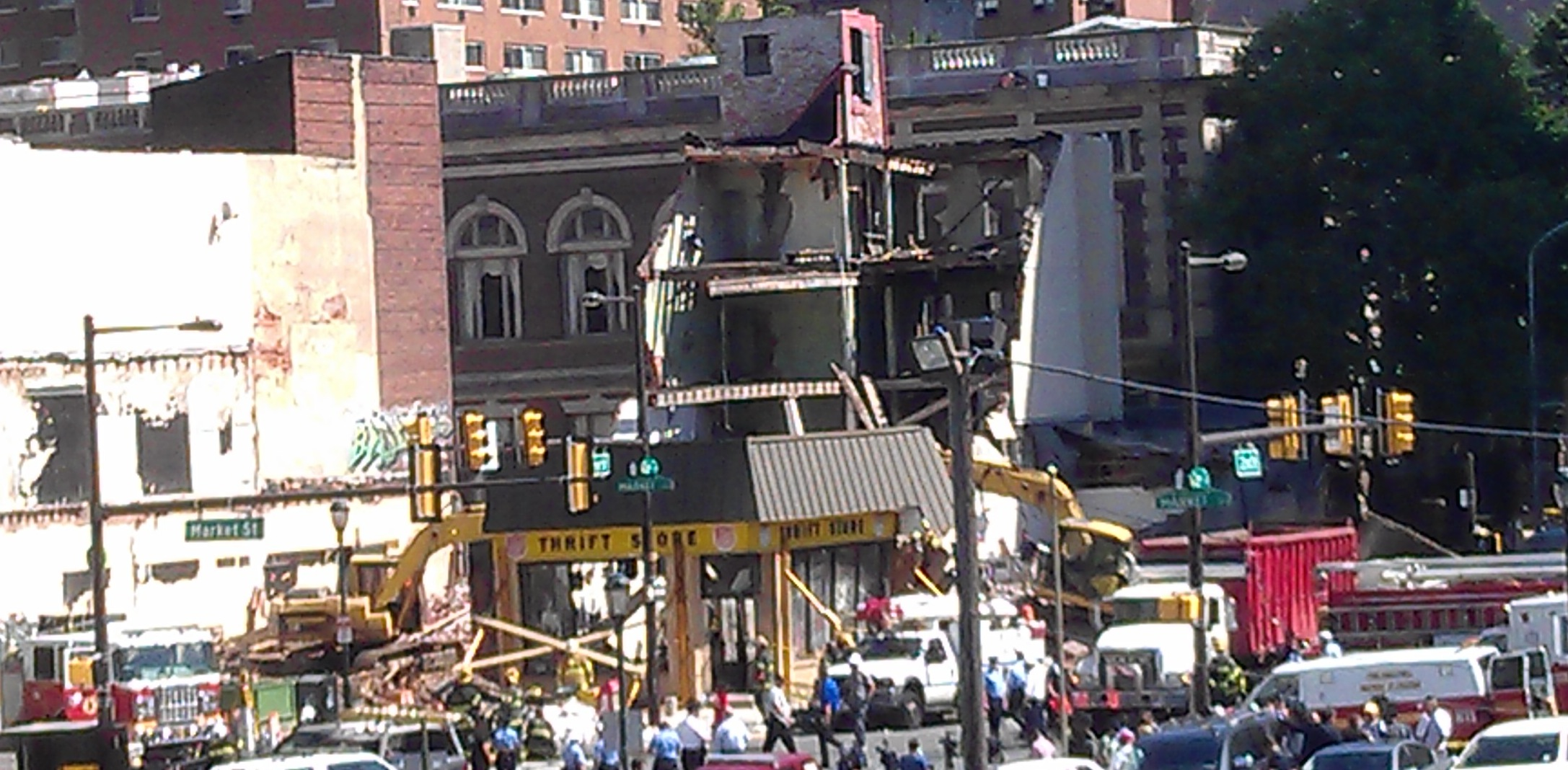
Rescue operations following the building's June 5, 2013 collapse

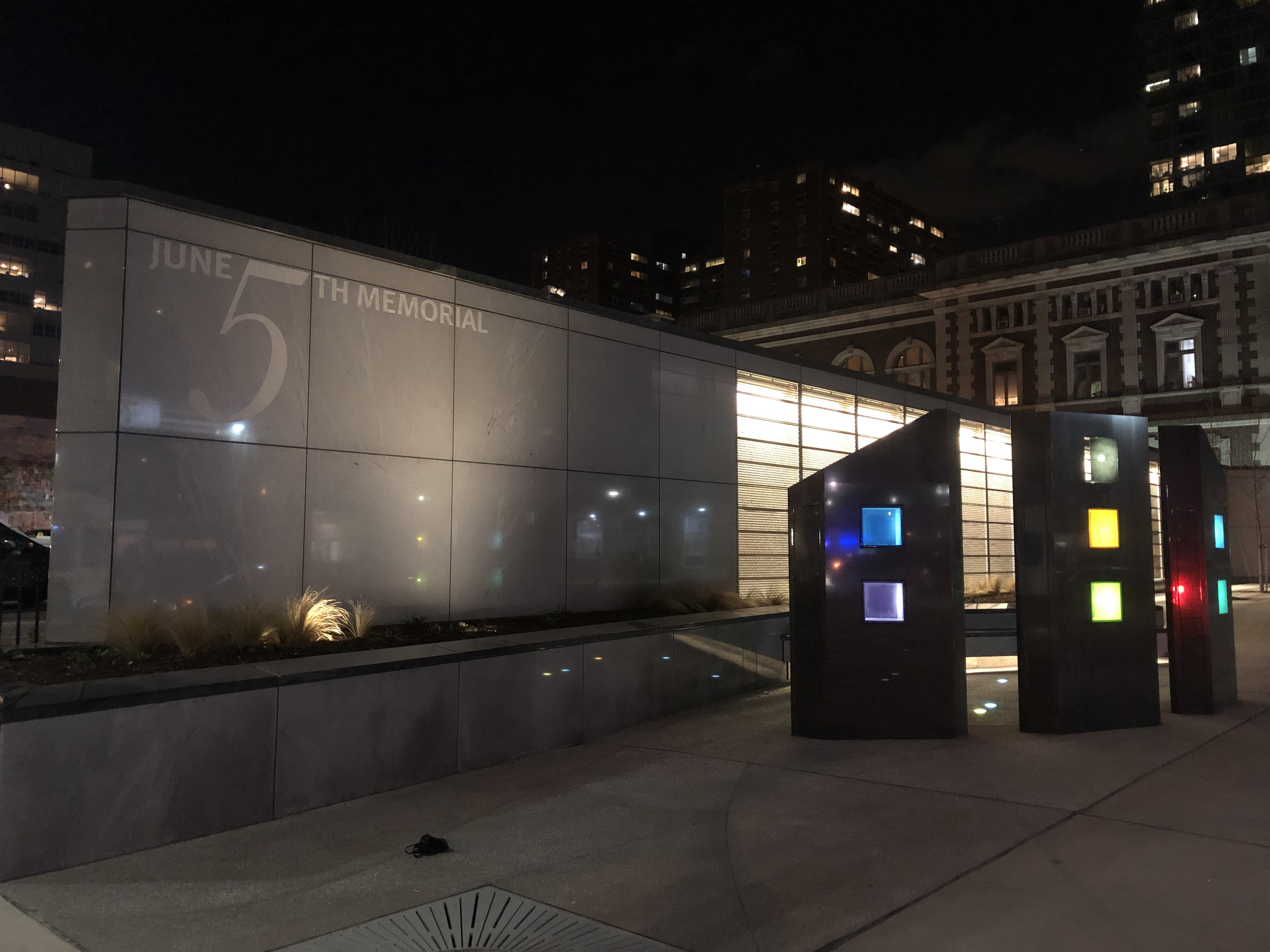
The June 5th memorial, subsequently erected near the site of the building's collapse

At 10:43 am, the four-story building under demolition collapsed onto the one-story building next door. The buildings crashed down with crumbling brick and wood snapping. Seven people died and 14 people were injured. A 51-year-old woman was trapped for 13 hours and then hospitalized at Hospital of the University of Pennsylvania in critical condition. The 13 other injuries were minor.

After the collapse, an 18-year-old high school student who had been walking by the building when it collapsed rushed to the scene and spent 15 minutes trying to free people from the rubble before emergency crews arrived. During a search-and-rescue operation, rescuers used buckets and their bare hands to move through bricks and rubble until the following morning.

It was soon discovered that surveillance video from the front of a SEPTA bus operating eastbound on Market Street between 23rd and 22nd Streets had captured the scene at the moment of collapse. Up to a minute of this footage was released by SEPTA to news media outlets in July.

=== Victims ===
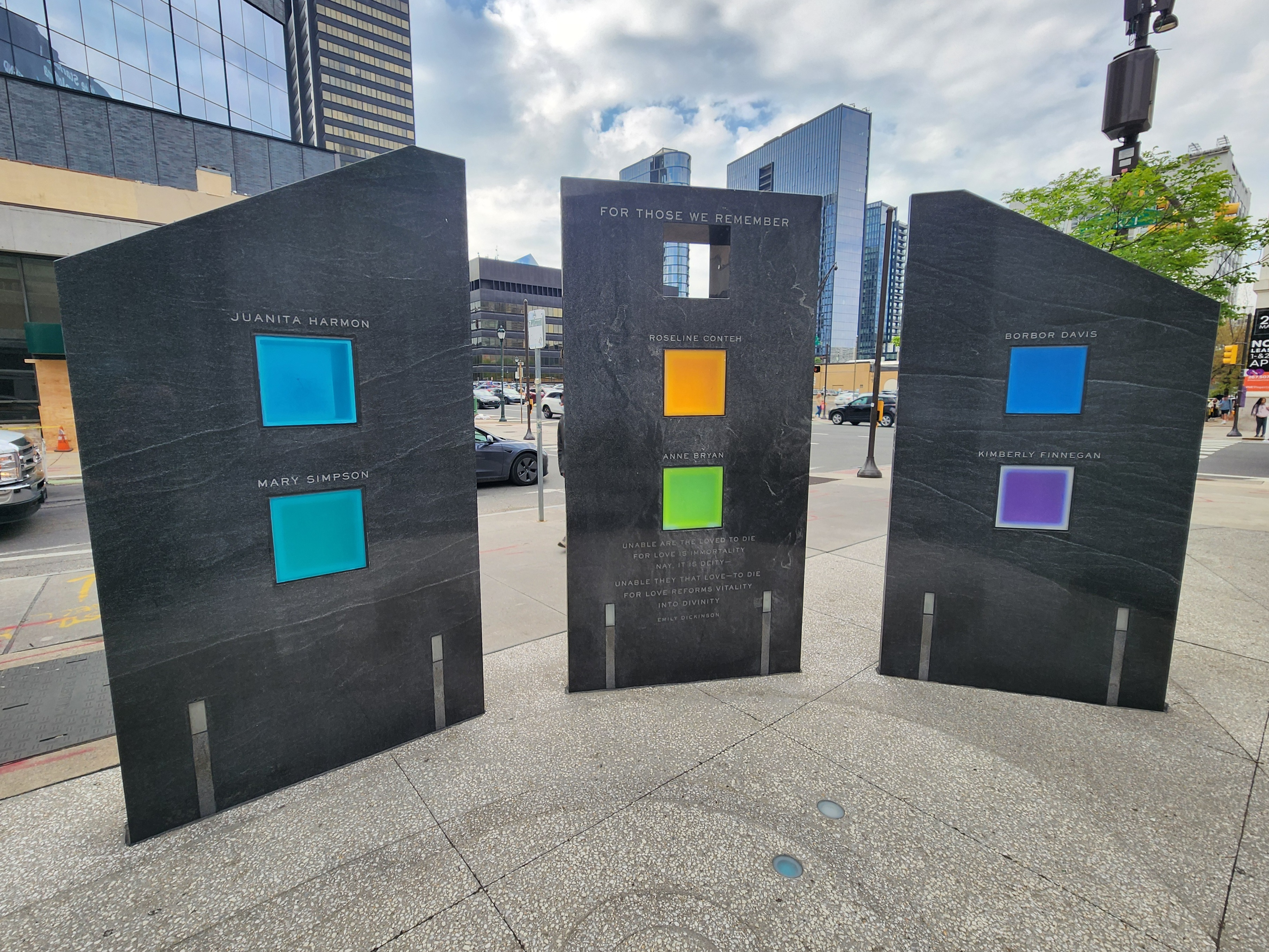
The June 5th memorial, viewed from the rear facing 22nd and Market Streets. The names of those killed are engraved above colored glass panes, with an empty frame representing all others affected by the collapse.

The six people killed by the collapse were:

- Anne Bryan, 24, an art student at the Pennsylvania Academy of the Fine Arts and daughter of Philadelphia City Treasurer Nancy Winkler
- Roseline Conteh, 52, a nurse and immigrant from Sierra Leone
- Bobor Davis, 68, a five-year Salvation Army employee
- Kimberly Finnegan, 35, a cashier working her first shift at the Salvation Army thrift store
- Juanita Harmon, 75, a retired secretary at the University of Pennsylvania
- Mary Simpson, 24, an audio engineer who was on a shopping trip with Anne Bryan

=== Suicide of building inspector ===
On June 12, 2013, Ronald Wagenhoffer, the 52-year-old City Department of Licenses and Inspections inspector responsible for inspecting the demolition site, was found dead in his truck with a gunshot to the chest. His death was ruled a suicide. As reported by NBC10, Wagenhoffer recorded a video shortly before his death where he expressed his remorse and culpability for the collapse: "It was my fault. I should have looked at those guys working, and I didn't."

== Initial city response ==
News reports on June 7 following the collapse indicated that despite multiple complaints, the demolition work at 22nd and Market Street went uninspected for more than three weeks before the deadly collapse. Subsequent reports indicated that Ronald Wagenhoffer had reported he visited the site on May 14 and found no violations. At the time, the city did not require demolition contractors to establish their qualifications.

On June 7, Philadelphia Mayor Michael Nutter held a press conference and issued two press statements in which he apologized to the dead and their families as well as the injured survivors and their families. Nutter also announced new demolition rules and standards designed to prevent similar tragedies. The new rules will require the same level of city monitoring and contractor expertise at private demolition sites that have been required during demolition at public sites. The new rules will prohibit contractors from using heavy machinery to demolish buildings adjacent to occupied structures, which was done at the 22nd and Market demolition. City inspectors were sent to over 300 demolition sites to check for safety violations.

Mayor Nutter said City Inspector General Amy Kurlan would begin an investigation of the collapse and government failings that contributed to it. Other investigations were underway by the Office of the City Controller, U.S. Occupational Safety and Health Administration, the Department of Licenses and Inspections, and the Philadelphia Police Department

== Investigations ==
=== Emails ===
On July 14, The Philadelphia Inquirer published a series of emails detailing a dispute between the Salvation Army and STB. Most of the emails also were copied to City Deputy Mayor Alan Greenberger and his top development aide, John Mondlak. STB sought access to the Salvation Army property in order to conduct demolition operations safely. The two parties could not reach an agreement; however, STB initiated demolition nonetheless. On May 22, Thomas Simmonds of STB emailed Deputy Mayor Greenberger, whose duties as deputy mayor for economic development included overseeing the city's Department of Licences and Inspections, saying that 2138 Market was in a state of partial demolition that created "a situation that poses a threat to life and limb", and "This nonsense must end before someone is seriously injured or worse: those are headlines none of us want to see or read." but the city took no action and STB proceeded with the demolition. Other emails indicated that the Salvation Army was also warned of the danger of collapse, but was in a long running dispute with STB regarding access to its building. Shortly after these emails were published in the Inquirer, the City of Philadelphia released numerous documents relating to the collapse.

On December 17, The Philadelphia Inquirer reported that they had obtained additional emails tied to the collapse, and which had been seen by the grand jury, which indicated the impatience of the developer with the pace of demolition and the demolition contractor's request for progress payments. An April 23 email indicated that Plato Marinakos, architect for STB, was getting bids for asphalt so that once demolition was complete, a parking lot could be installed. An April 29 email indicated that Richard Basciano, the STB owner, had stopped by the site and was "shocked that the buildings were still standing," and demanded progress. Several other of the emails also emphasize the desire of the owners to get the demolition completed. On May 22 Thom Simmonds emailed Alex Wolfington, a consultant to STB, opposing further negotiations with the Salvation Army: "Why?..Waste more time? Wait for someone to be killed? You can do what you want but I am NOT backing off with these people and their half-baked charity. Perhaps you have the time and/or desire to 'deal' with their idiotic behavior. I don't and I won't. I have to look after the interests of the Owners - Richard and his daughters."

=== Criminal investigation ===
On June 8, Sean Benschop, the crane operator working on the demolition job at the time, was charged with six counts of involuntary manslaughter, 13 counts of recklessly endangering another person, and one count of risking a catastrophe. A blood test performed after the collapse when he admitted to taking codeine and percocet, revealed marijuana in his system. Benschop turned himself in to police later that day.

On June 10, Philadelphia District Attorney Seth Williams convened a grand jury to investigate the circumstances that led to the collapse, a step that may result in criminal charges against responsible individuals. On Sunday, June 16, The Philadelphia Inquirer ran an editorial calling for the investigations of the Market Street collapse to look at top officials and property owners. The Inquirer said, "it was disheartening to hear a former mayor, Ed Rendell, defend Richard Basciano, who owns the building that fell through the thrift shop." The Inquirer editorial stated that "responsibility goes much higher than Sean Benschop, the excavator operator who allegedly tested positive for drugs and has been charged with involuntary manslaughter and than the city building inspector who apparently killed himself ...[over having] wished he had done more to prevent it.”

==== Grand jury charges ====
On November 25, 2013, R. Seth Williams, the district attorney, said based on recommendations from the grand jury, prosecutors had formally charged the contractor, Griffin T. Campbell, 49, with six counts each of third-degree murder and involuntary manslaughter, 13 counts of reckless endangerment and single counts of criminal conspiracy, risking catastrophe and causing catastrophe. Mr. Williams said that the collapse occurred because the building's structural supports, including some of its wooden joists, had been removed early in the demolition, leaving walls and floors without adequate support. Mr. Campbell was being paid a flat fee for the demolition and was intent on doing the work as cheaply as possible while saving scrap from the building for resale.

According to an ABC News article, "the building owner who chose Campbell's $112,000 bid to take down three attached storefronts - when other bids were two or three times that amount - was not charged Monday. However, the grand jury has not finished its work, and Williams declined comment on whether owner Richard Basciano could be charged." Richard Basciano, a commercial developer previously dubbed the pornography king of New York's Times Square, owned the three adjacent, long run-down buildings being demolished by Griffin Campbell to make way for redevelopment. Plato Marinakos the architect who had been retained by STB, had secured the demolition permit from City Hall, testified before the grand jury after he was promised immunity.

In October 2014, Campbell was convicted of involuntary manslaughter and other charges. On January 8, 2016, he was sentenced to 15 years to 30 years imprisonment, and Sean Benschop received a sentence of 7.5 years to 15 years imprisonment for involuntary manslaughter charges. On September 1, 2021, An appeals court denied to overrule Griffin Campbell's sentence. The court cited how there was no evidence to suggest a conflict of interest making a obstruction to a fair trial.

== Legal proceedings ==
=== OSHA charges ===
On November 16, exactly six months after OSHA inspectors visited the demolition site and noted infractions, the U.S. Department of Labor's Occupational Safety and Health Administration cited Griffin Campbell, doing business as Campbell Construction, and Sean Benschop, doing business as S&R Contracting, for safety violations, including three willful per-instance violations, following the June 5, 2013, building collapse that killed six people and injured 14. The Philadelphia Inquirer reported that David Michaels, assistant U.S. secretary of labor for occupational safety and health said "This tragic incident could and should have been prevented," "We should not be here today."

According to The Philadelphia Inquirer, "Michaels also said the agency had begun discussions with the Justice Department about possible prosecutions, on top of a local grand-jury investigation that the District Attorney's Office initiated in June. OSHA levied the maximum fine possible against the Campbell firm - $70,000 - for each of what regulators determined were three "willful violations" of basic safety requirements: failing to prepare an engineering study for the demolition project; disobeying a rule requiring higher stories to be removed before demolition begins on lower floors; and removing lateral bracing, provided by the floors, to support walls more than one story high.

Removal of lateral bracing is a safety breach so "egregious," OSHA regulators said, that the penalty was levied twice, for violations on two separate days.

Additional citations for hard-hat violations, inadequate fall protection, and stair inspections pushed Campbell's total fines to $313,000.

S&R was fined $84,000 for one "willful" violation of lateral bracing requirements, and two "serious" violations related to training and failure to protect employees from falls." In response to the charges, Griffin Campbell's attorney, William Hobson noted that "Inspectors from both OSHA and the city's Department of Licenses and Inspections had visited the Market Street site repeatedly while the demolition was underway, Hobson said, "and neither OSHA nor L&I ever shut down what was a safely-conceived demolition of the buildings. . .

=== Civil cases ===
A lawsuit was filed on June 6 for financial damages on behalf of Nadine White, the survivor who was buried under rubble. City officials began inspecting hundreds of demolition sites throughout the city. The demolition contractor violated several federal safety regulations and it was said that the building's owner should have picked a more qualified and competent contractor to do the work.

On September 3, 2013, a wrongful death complaint was filed by George Simpson, brother and administrator for the estate of Mary Lea Simpson. Mary Simpson, age twenty-four, was one of six people killed in the collapse. Defendants named in the lawsuit were Richard Basciano, STB Investments Corporation, Thomas Simmonds, Frank Cresci, 2100 West Market Street Corporation, 303 West 42nd Street Corporation, Nicetown House Development Corporation a/k/a Griffin Campbell Construction, Griffin T. Campbell, S&R Contracting, Sean Benschop, Plato Studio Architect, LLC, and Plato Marinakos, Jr. Additionally named as defendants were the Salvation Army in Greater Philadelphia, The Trustees of the Salvation Army in Pennsylvania, The Salvation Army Eastern Territory, and the National Headquarters of the Salvation Army. Also named were Alistair Fraser, Operations Manager for the Salvation Army Eastern Territory responsible for architectural and/or engineering issues for the Salvation Army Thrift Store; Charles Deitrick, General Secretary of the Salvation Army; and John Cranford, Administrator of the Salvation Army.

On September 17, 2013, the parents of Art student Anne Bryan, City Treasurer Nancy Winkler and her husband Jay Bryan, filed a wrongful death suit. The couple held a press conference and called for answers, including the creation of an independent blue ribbon panel to investigate the City's Department of Licenses and Inspections.

Marika Plekan, a Ukrainian immigrant who was trapped under rubble in the collapse for 13 hours and survived, but lost both her legs as a result, was awarded $95.6 million for her injuries in a lawsuit. Plekan died in 2021 of COVID-19 at 59.

== Regulatory reforms ==
In response to the collapse, the Philadelphia City Council has held hearings to evaluate the laws that regulate demolition in the city and the changes that Mayor Nutter enacted in response to the tragedy.
