= Richard Basciano =

American property developer

- Born: July 16, 1925; Baltimore, Maryland, U.S.
- Died: May 1, 2017 (aged 91)
- Occupation: Property developer

Richard Basciano (July 16, 1925 – May 1, 2017) was an American property developer active in New York City and Philadelphia.

Basciano was born in 1925 in Baltimore, Maryland, where his father was a professional boxer. In the 1960s, Basciano began selling pornography around New York in partnership with Gambino crime family mobster Robert DiBernardo. In the 1970s and 1980s, Basciano's real estate empire was centered on the Show World Center, New York's largest and oldest sex emporium. He was dubbed the "porn king of Times Square" in press reports. Perhaps his best-known property in Philadelphia was the Forum Theatre, an adult theatre.

In early June 2013, a building controlled by Basciano at 2138 Market Street in Philadelphia collapsed during demolition, killing six and injuring thirteen. In early 2017, he was among those found to be liable for the disaster.

By the mid-1990s, the adult entertainment industry was undergoing rapid change. Efforts by the city to sanitize Times Square compounded the widespread adoption of VCRs. Operating through STB Investment Group and other firms, Basciano sold his properties as neighborhoods became gentrified.

Basciano died on May 1, 2017, in New York City at the age of 91.
