= Is There Sex After Death? =

1971 film by Alan Abel

- Directed by: Alan Abel; Jeanne Abel
- Written by: Alan Abel; Jeanne Abel; Buck Henry
- Produced by: Alan Abel; Jeanne Abel; Michael Rothschild
- Starring: Buck Henry; Robert Downey, Sr. Marshall Efron; Holly Woodlawn; Jim Moran; Earle Doud; Larry Wolf
- Cinematography: Arthur Albert; Gerald Cotts
- Edited by: Jeanne Abel
- Release date: 1971
- Running time: 102 minutes
- Country: United States
- Language: English

Is There Sex After Death? is a 1971 mockumentary and mondo film.

== Plot ==
Driving through New York City in his Sexmobile, Dr. Harrison Rogers of the Bureau of Sexological Investigation searches out luminary figures in the world of sex. According to the movie, the answer to the title question is: "No, only affection".

== Cast ==
- Alan Abel as Dr. Rogers
- Buck Henry as Dr. Louise Manos
- Marshall Efron as Vince Domino
- Holly Woodlawn as herself
- Robert Downey Sr. as himself
- Jim Moran as Dr. Elevenike
- James Randi as Seance Medium
- Earle Doud as Merkin
- Larry Wolf as Sexbowl Announcer/Seance Spirit
- Mink Stole as Dominatrix
- James Dixon as Richard Nixon
- Kathie Fitch as Clinic Patient (credited as Kathy Everett)

== Reception ==
Film critic Vincent Canby of The New York Times praised the film: "The movie, is critically speaking, anarchic, superficially dirty, often crude, and so exuberant that it sometimes doesn't know when to stop. It is also, more than half of the time, very, very funny." In a positive review for San Antonio Express-News, Ron White highlights the comedy, writing that the film "is funny for true comedic reasons—satire, the juxtaposition of the incongruous, and dead-pan treatments of the ridiculous." Writer Mary Rita Kurycki of Democrat and Chronicle praised the satirical and comedic elements but wrote that parts of the film are a "bore." Similarly, Martin Malina of the Montreal Star wrote that it is "so outrageously funny that I cannot help but recommend it."

== Controversy ==
On March 12, 1980, the ON TV pay channel aired the film on WXON (channel 20, now WMYD) in Detroit. It was scheduled to air again ten days later, but it did not. WXON station manager Aben Johnson, who was alerted to the film's content (including sex and nudity) by a station employee during its original airing, decided against showing it again, substituting Saturday Night Fever instead. ON TV's policy at the time forbade showing any films with an X rating, for adults only; Is There Sex After Death? was apparently not given a rating by the Motion Picture Association of America at all until 1975, when it was granted an 'R' certificate, making the movie seemingly within ON's standards. Still, WXON never showed the film again on its ON TV affiliate, which closed in 1983.

== See also ==
- List of American films of 1971
