= Wally Butterworth =

American radio announcer (1901–1974)

Herbert Wallace Butterworth (October 25, 1901 – February 24, 1974) was an American radio announcer and host of variety and quiz shows. Later in his life, he was active in opposing the civil rights movement.

Born in Philadelphia, Butterworth aspired to be a singer from an early age. He took singing lessons and after graduating from Swarthmore High School as president of his class, made two singing tours in Canada and the eastern United States.

Butterworth auditioned for the role as an announcer for NBC radio in New York City in the early 1930s. He gained the job and was stationed in Chicago, Illinois. He covered the Chicago Civic Opera, the Symphony, football games and livestock parades. After a stint in the Navy, he was hired as the announcer of Vox Pop, but in 1936, co-host Jerry Belcher left the program, and Butterworth took over as host. In 1939, the show moved from NBC radio to CBS radio.

His work on Vox Pop led Butterworth to host other quiz programs, some of which he created. This continued from the late 1930s until the early 1960s. Butterworth lost a lawsuit against General Electric over a contract for a television quiz show which he felt was directly modeled after one of his radio programs.

The lawsuit between Butterworth and GE led him to become politically active. He broadcast a radio program in Atlanta on which he opposed the NAACP convention and attacked blacks, non-Christians and Catholics. The show was cancelled after being on the air for only two weeks, and the resulting lawsuit that he filed against the radio station was unsuccessful. Around 1961, the Georgia offshoot of the Ku Klux Klan, the National Knights of the Ku Klux Klan used recordings narrated by Butterworth for promotion. With James Venable, Butterworth formed the Defensive Legion of Registered Americans in 1962. For its offshoot, the Christian Voters and Buyers League, Butterworth narrated a series of spoken voice recordings promoting antisemitism, racism, and a boycott of kosher products.

Butterworth died in Pennsylvania on February 24, 1974.
