= Hugh Troy =

American painter and prankster

Hugh Charles Troy, Jr. (1906–1964) was a US painter who is noted for his pranks.

Troy was a son of a Cornell University dairy professor of the same name, and both father and son were members of the Quill and Dagger society. Troy attended Cornell as an architecture student from 1922 to 1927, although he was suspended without receiving a degree due to a particular joke that offended the administration. Although many of his practical jokes on campus are legendary, university historians have been unable to prove their truthfulness and some suspect the majority of his tales to be exaggerated or entirely fabricated. After serving in the military in World War II (under Gen. Curtis LeMay), he made his living as an illustrator for books and magazines, authoring three children's stories. He died in 1964.

== Notable practical jokes ==
- Using a wastebasket made of a rhinoceros foot borrowed from Louis Agassiz Fuertes, Troy made what appeared to be rhinoceros tracks across campus and to the lake that was the source of drinking water for the area, Beebe Lake. This was done during a winter snowstorm. Troy also cut a large hole in the ice on the edge of the lake so it appeared that the animal had fallen in. Reportedly, many people stopped drinking the water until Troy revealed the prank with an anonymous letter.
- Troy took the galoshes of a Cornell lecturer and painted human feet on them. Then he covered his handiwork with a black paint that would wash off. When the lecturer used the galoshes in the rain, he looked like he was walking with bare feet.
- While working as the student sports reporter at Cornell, Troy invented a character named "Johnny Tsal". Tsal was a poor wretch of a character who would inevitably finish last in whatever race that Troy was assigned to cover. "Tsal" was "last" spelled backwards. Troy said he invented this perpetual loser so that he would not have to feel bad about reporting someone's defeat.
- In New York City, Troy would visit Central Park carrying a park bench he had bought. Police, suspecting he was trying to steal it, arrested him a number of times. He always presented the bill of sale and was released. Hugh got his revenge by coordinating with a number of friends to take the park benches all at the same time. Because the police thought it was "that guy with the bill of sale" again none of the bench thieves were stopped as they walked out of the park.
- Troy and friends once dressed up as workers and began digging in the middle of the street. Police arrived and began to divert traffic. Once they dug a large hole they left leaving confused policemen.
- Troy also dressed as workers and removed all of the light bulbs from the Waldorf-Astoria Hotel without being questioned.
- According to one story from Ithaca, New York, Troy and his friends saw a large sign that read "JESUS SAVES". They decided to remove it from its original place beside a bridge and put it where it would do some good: on the front of a local bank. Legend has it that the bank did a record amount of business the next day.
- In 1935, at an exhibition of the works of Vincent van Gogh in New York's Museum of Modern Art, Troy took a piece of corned beef, carved it into a shape of an ear and put it on display with a plaque that declared it was the ear that Van Gogh had cut off in 1888. People flocked to see it until museum authorities removed it.
- During World War II, Troy got fed up with military bureaucracy. He invented a new form for reports on the use of flypaper and sent it to command. The story goes that the Pentagon demanded that other units send theirs as well. Just when Hugh was sure that everyone was wasting time with these flypaper reports, he sent another letter to the Pentagon mentioning that counts might be inaccurate due to the counting of old flies from previous counts. To counter this, he suggested that each fly be daubed with a little ketchup using a toothpick. By doing so, previously counted flies would now have a marking for the next count. This task was then added to the roster.
- One of his jokes can still be seen. The giant globe in the lobby of the old Daily News Building in New York was painted by Troy. All the cities on it are national capitals, except one: Ithaca.

== Sources ==
- Merry Gentlemen (and One Lady). J. Bryan ISBN 0-689-11533-4
- Laugh With Hugh Troy. Con Troy. Trojan Books. 1983.
- Life In A Putty Knife Factory, by H. Allen Smith, 1943, Doubleday, Doran & Co., Chapter 5, "Chiefly About Hugh Troy."
