= At Newport '63 (Lambert, Hendricks & Bavan album) =

Live album by Lambert, Hendricks & Bavan
- Released: 1963
- Recorded: July 5, 1963, Newport Jazz Festival, Rhode Island
- Genre: Vocal jazz
- Length: 42:21
- Label: RCA Victor
- Producer: George Avakian

Lambert, Hendricks & Bavan chronology
Recorded "Live" at Basin Street East (1963)	At Newport '63 (1963)	Havin' a Ball at the Village Gate (1963)

At Newport '63 is an album by the jazz vocalese group Lambert, Hendricks & Bavan recorded at the 1963 Newport Jazz Festival. The album features the group who had re-formed in 1963 featuring Dave Lambert and Jon Hendricks, with Yolande Bavan replacing Annie Ross who had left the group in 1962.

The album was reissued in 1999 as part of RCA Victor's Classic Edition series, which featured improved audio quality and original cover art.

== Reception ==
Professional ratings
Review scores
Source	Rating
Allmusic	3/5 stars

Billboard reviewed At Newport '63 upon its release in their 16 November 1963 issue, calling the album "A wild performance indeed."

Scott Yanow, writing on AllMusic said of the album: "Highlights include 'One O'Clock Jump,' 'Watermelon Man,' 'Cloudburst' and a funny rendition of Hendricks' 'Gimme That Wine.' All of the records by this group (and its predecessor Lambert, Hendricks and Ross) are well worth acquiring even if Yolande Bavan was not a soloist on the level of an Annie Ross."

This performance of 'Yeh-Yeh' inspired the 1964 hit single by British vocalist Georgie Fame.

C. Andrew Hovan, writing for All About Jazz said that the album "...proves to be a rhapsodic moment captured on tape that at the time provided evidence that the loss of Annie Ross was anything but the demise of the group. Sure, Bavan didn't have the range that Ross did, but she was more than able to keep up with her two gentleman friends and add a different tonal color to the group to boot! ...Terry and Hawkins sound inspired and Mahones and the trio provide the kind of spunky support that spurs on such performances". Hovan also described pianist Gildo Mahones as "tragically underrated" and trumpeter Clark Terry as sounding "tart and tasty" on "Sack O' Woe".

== Track listing ==
1. "Watermelon Man" (Herbie Hancock, Jon Hendricks, Big Mama Thornton) – 4:45
2. "Sack O' Woe" (Cannonball Adderley, Nat Adderley, Hendricks) – 3:38
3. "One O'Clock Jump" (Count Basie) – 2:42
4. "Deedle-Lee Deedle-Lum" – 5:24
5. "Gimme That Wine" (Hendricks) – 3:18
6. "Yeh, Yeh" (Rodgers Grant, Hendricks, Pat Patrick) – 5:59
7. "Walkin'" (Richard Carpenter, Hendricks) – 8:43
8. "Cloudburst" (Carpenter, Hendricks, Leroy Kirkland) – 2:12
9. "Bye Bye Blackbird" (Mort Dixon, Ray Henderson) – 5:40

== Personnel ==
- Dave Lambert, Jon Hendricks, Yolande Bavan – vocals
- Coleman Hawkins – tenor saxophone
- Clark Terry – flugelhorn, trumpet
- Gildo Mahones – piano
- George Tucker – double bass
- Jimmie Smith – drums

Production

- Janet DeMatteis – artwork
- Griffin Norman – design
- Mickey Crofford – engineer
- George Avakian – liner notes, producer
- Chuck Stewart – photography
- James P. Nichols – reissue producer
- Joshua Sherman – series coordinator
- Steve Gates – series producer
