= Recorded "Live" at Basin Street East =

Live album by Lambert, Hendricks & Bavan
- Released: 1963
- Recorded: 1963, Basin Street East, New York City
- Genre: Vocal jazz
- Length: 40:43
- Label: RCA Victor
- Producer: George Avakian

Lambert, Hendricks & Bavan chronology
Recorded "Live" at Basin Street East (1963)	At Newport '63 (1963)

Recorded "Live" at Basin Street East is an album by the jazz vocalese group Lambert, Hendricks & Bavan recorded at the New York City nightclub Basin Street East. The album features the group who had re-formed in 1963 featuring Dave Lambert and Jon Hendricks, with Yolande Bavan replacing Annie Ross who had left the group in 1962.

== Reception ==
Professional ratings
Review scores
Source	Rating
Allmusic	3/5 stars
New Record Mirror	3/5 stars

Scott Yanow, writing on AllMusic said of the album that "This recording finds Jon Hendricks and Dave Lambert in prime form, with Bavan doing her best to fit in (her accent does stand out, although her singing skills are impressive) ...The highlights include a classic rendition of "Doodlin'," John Coltrane's "Cousin Mary," Hendricks' humorous "Feed Me" and "Dis Hyunh" (really "This Here"). An entertaining performance overall, recorded during a three-day period."

== Track listing ==
1. "This Could Be the Start of Something" (Steve Allen) – 3:08
2. "Shiny Stockings" (Frank Foster, Jon Hendricks) – 4:37
3. "Slightly Out of Tune (Desafinado)" (Antonio Carlos Jobim, Newton Mendonça, Hendricks) – 2:24
4. "Doodlin'" (Horace Silver, Hendricks) – 3:30
5. "Cousin Mary" (John Coltrane, Hendricks) – 3:43
6. "April in Paris" (Vernon Duke, E.Y. "Yip" Harburg, Hendricks) – 4:20
7. "Feed Me" (Hendricks) – 2:38
8. "One Note Samba" (Jobim, Mendonça, Hendricks) – 2:59
9. "Melba's Blues" (Hendricks) – 4:09
10. "This Here" (Bobby Timmons, Hendricks) – 3:29
11. "Swingin' Till the Girls Come Home" (Hendricks) – 5:46

== Personnel ==
- Dave Lambert, Jon Hendricks, Yolande Bavan – vocals
