= Jimmy Wormworth =

American jazz drummer (born 1937)

James Edward Wormworth III (born August 14, 1937, in Utica, New York) is an American jazz drummer. He was described by Leonard Feather in 1960 edition of The Encyclopedia of Jazz as "One of the most promising young drummers on the New York scene."

He is the father of drummer James Wormworth and bassist Tracy Wormworth.

== Biography ==
Born in Utica, New York, Jimmy Wormworth was the son of the African-American jazz drummer and pianist James Wormworth II and Ann Mariani, the sister of the Utica tenor saxophonist Dick Mariani. He began studying drums with George Claesgens in Utica in 1947 and was playing professionally in upstate New York while still in his teens.

Wormworth went on to tour Europe with American combos in 1956 and 1957, toured with Nellie Lutcher from February 1958, began working with Les Jazz Modes in 1958 and with Lou Donaldson and Phineas Newborn from 1958 until 1959. Between January and May 1959 he worked with Mal Waldron in the house band at the New York club the Five Spot and began touring with Lambert, Hendricks and Ross in October 1959.

Wormworth's discography as a sideman includes recordings in the late 1950s with the Jazz Modes (Charlie Rouse and Julius Watkins), Lou Donaldson, the early 1960s with Lambert, Hendricks and Ross and Jon Hendricks, the 1970s with Al Haig, J. R. Monterose, Allen Eager, Hod O'Brien and, in this century, albums with Annie Ross, Tardo Hammer, Charles Davis, John Marshall and the German pianist Joe Haider.

Wormworth met and began working with Al Haig in 1969 and performed with him regularly from about 1974 until Haig's death in 1982. He taught workshops and master classes at the Konservatorium Wien in 2012. He was also a featured contributor for No One but Me, a 2012 documentary film produced by ConnectFilm about jazz singer Annie Ross.

== Discography ==
=== As sideman ===
With Charlie Rouse and Julius Watkins

- The Jazz Modes (Atlantic, 1958)

With Lou Donaldson

- Light-Foot (Blue Note, 1958)

With Lambert, Hendricks & Ross

- Lambert, Hendricks & Ross Sing Ellington (Columbia, 1960)
- L, H & R Flying High with the Ike Isaacs Trio (Columbia, 1961)

With Jon Hendricks

- Evolution of the Blues Song (Columbia, 1960)

With Al Haig

- Serendipity (King, 1977)
- Manhattan Memories (Sea Breeze, 1977 [1983])

With J. R. Monterose

- Welcome Back, J.R! (Progressive, 1979)

With Hod O'Brien

- Bits and Pieces (Uptown, 1982)

With Allen Eager

- Renaissance (Uptown, 1982)

With Tardo Hammer

- Tardo's Tempo (Sharp Nine, 2004)
- Simple Pleasure (Cellar Liv, 2013)

With John Marshall

- Frisky (Organic Music, 2005)
- Waltz for Worms (Organic, 2010)

With Annie Ross

- Let Me Sing (CAP, 2005)

With Stephanie Nakasian

- I Love You (Spice of Life, 2006)

With Gil Coggins

- Better Late Than Never (Smalls, 2007)

With Charles Davis

- Land of Dreams (Smalls, 2007)

With Joe Haider

- A Moment in Montreux (Sound Hills, 2013)
