= Havin' a Ball at the Village Gate =

Live album by Lambert, Hendricks & Bavan
- Released: 1963
- Recorded: December 20–21, 1963 at the Village Gate, New York City
- Genre: Vocal jazz
- Length: 39:53
- Label: RCA Victor
- Producer: George Avakian

Lambert, Hendricks & Bavan chronology
At Newport '63 (1963)	Havin' a Ball at the Village Gate (1963)

Havin' a Ball at the Village Gate is the last album by the reformed jazz vocal group Lambert, Hendricks & Bavan, of Dave Lambert and Jon Hendricks with Yolande Bavan. The group was formed after Annie Ross left the vocal group in 1962. The album was recorded live at the Village Gate club in New York City on December 20 and 21, 1963.

== Track listing ==
1. "Jumpin' at the Woodside" (Count Basie, Jon Hendricks) - 4:08
2. "Meetin' Time" (Benny Carter / Jon Hendricks) - 4:22
3. "Days of Wine and Roses" (Henry Mancini, Johnny Mercer) - 3:06
4. "Rusty Dusty Blues" (J. Mayo Williams, Hendricks) - 3:46
5. "Three Blind Mice" (Hendricks) - 3:41
6. "Nothin' for Nothin'" (Hendricks) - 3:31
7. "With 'er 'ead Tucked Underneath'er Arm" (Bert Lee, R.P. Weston) - 3:17
8. "It's Sand Man" (Ed Lewis, Hendricks) - 2:57
9. "I Wonder What's Become of Sally" (Jack Yellen, Milton Ager) - 4:08
10. "Stops and Goes Blues" (Hendricks) - 3:20

== Personnel ==
- Dave Lambert, Jon Hendricks, Yolande Bavan – vocals
- Thad Jones - cornet, flugelhorn
- Booker Ervin - tenor saxophone
- Gildo Mahones – piano
- George Tucker – double bass
- Jimmie Smith – drums
