= At Basin Street East =

At Basin Street East may refer to:

- At Basin Street East (Billy Eckstine and Quincy Jones album), 1961
- Live at Basin Street East, a 1964 album by Ray Bryant
- Recorded "Live" at Basin Street East, a 1963 album by Lambert, Hendricks & Bavan
