= The Hottest New Group in Jazz =

Studio album by Lambert, Hendricks & Ross
- Released: December 1959
- Length: 29:12
- Label: Columbia
- Producers: Teo Macero; Irving Townsend

Lambert, Hendricks & Ross chronology
The Swingers! (1958)	The Hottest New Group in Jazz (1959)	Lambert, Hendricks & Ross Sing Ellington (1961)

Professional ratings
Review scores
Source	Rating
AllMusic	5/5 stars
DownBeat	3.5/5 stars
The Penguin Guide to Jazz Recordings	(CD reissue)

The Hottest New Group in Jazz, also known by its full title Lambert, Hendricks, & Ross!: "The Hottest New Group in Jazz" or alternatively considered self-titled, is the fourth album by Lambert, Hendricks & Ross, released in December 1959. The title is a quote from Downbeat magazine. The CD reissue combines the full original album with the group's two other Columbia albums: the 1961 LP Lambert, Hendricks & Ross Sing Ellington and the 1961 LP High Flying. The CD release additionally includes seven previously unreleased "rarities", recorded in 1962. On all these recordings, the group is backed up by the Ike Isaacs Trio.

== Track listing ==
=== Original album ===
1. "Charleston Alley" (Horace Henderson, Jon Hendricks, Leroy Kirkland) – 3:21
2. "Moanin'" (Bobby Timmons) – 2:37
3. "Twisted" (Wardell Gray, Annie Ross) – 2:19
4. "Bijou" (Ralph Burns, Jon Hendricks) – 3:19
5. "Cloudburst" (Jimmy Harris, Leroy Kirkland) – 2:18
6. "Centerpiece" (Harry Edison, Jon Hendricks) – 2:29
7. "Gimme That Wine" (Jon Hendricks) – 3:00
8. "Sermonette" (Cannonball Adderley, Jon Hendricks) – 3:50
9. "Summertime" (based on the recording of Miles Davis & Gil Evans) (George Gershwin, Ira Gershwin, DuBose Heyward) – 1:46
10. "Everybody's Boppin'" (Jon Hendricks) – 4:13

=== CD extras, disc one ===
1. "Cotton Tail" (Duke Ellington) – 2:57
2. "All Too Soon" (Duke Ellington, Carl Sigman) – 3:29
3. "Happy Anatomy" (Duke Ellington) – 1:20
4. "Rocks in My Bed" (Duke Ellington) – 3:11
5. "Main Stem" (Duke Ellington) – 2:56
6. "I Don't Know What Kind of Blues I've Got" (Duke Ellington) – 3:31
7. "Things Ain't What They Used to Be" (Mercer Ellington, Ted Persons) – 2:50
8. "Midnight Indigo" (Duke Ellington) – 2:35
9. "What am I Here For?" (Duke Ellington) – 3:01
10. "In a Mellow Tone" (Duke Ellington, Milt Gabler) – 3:31
11. "Caravan" (Duke Ellington, Irving Mills, Juan Tizol) – 2:34

=== CD disc two ===
1. "Come On Home" (Horace Silver) – 5:30
2. "The New ABC" (Dave Lambert) – 3:08
3. "Farmer's Market" (Art Farmer, Annie Ross) – 2:34
4. "Cookin' at the Continental" (Jon Hendricks, Horace Silver) – 3:08
5. "With Malice Toward None" (Jon Hendricks, Tom McIntosh) – 2:51
6. "Hi-Fly" (Randy Weston) – 3:47
7. "Home Cookin'" (Horace Silver) – 4:27
8. "Halloween Spooks" (Dave Lambert) – 2:19
9. "Popity Pop" (Slim Gaillard) – 4:49
10. "Blue" (Gildo Mahones) – 3:51
11. "Mr. P.C." (John Coltrane) – 3:20
12. "Walkin'" (Richard Carpenter) – 2:17
13. "This Here (Dis Hyunh)" (Jon Hendricks, Bobby Timmons) – 4:10
14. "Swingin' Till the Girls Come Home" (Oscar Pettiford) – 5:22
15. "Twist City" (Matthew Gee) – 2:25
16. "Just a Little Bit of Twist" (Don Covay) – 2:24
17. "A Night in Tunisia" (Dizzy Gillespie, Frank Paparelli) – 2:45
18. "A Night in Tunisia" (Alternate Version) (Dizzy Gillespie, Frank Paparelli) – 2:44

== Personnel ==
=== Musicians ===
- Walter Bolden – drums
- Ron Carter – bass
- Harry "Sweets" Edison – trumpet
- Jon Hendricks – vocals
- Ike Isaacs – bass
- Dave Lambert – vocals
- Gildo Mahones – piano
- Stu Martin – drums
- Pony Poindexter – alto saxophone
- Annie Ross – vocals
- Jimmy Wormworth – drums
- William Yancy – bass

=== Production ===
- Steve Berdowitz – reissue series
- Curtis Brown – liner notes
- Robert Constanzo – packaging manager
- Will Friedwald – liner notes
- Kevin Gore – reissue series
- Don Hunstein – photography
- Teo Macero – producer
- Randall Martin – design
- Nedra Olds-Neal – reissue producer
- Seth Rothstein – production coordination, project director
- Tony Sellari – art direction, reissue art director
- Vernon Smith – photography
- Irving Townsend – producer
- Mark Wilder – digital mastering, digital remastering
