= Twisted (Annie Ross song) =

Song
- Released: 1952
- Genre: Jazz
- Composer: Wardell Gray
- Lyricist: Annie Ross

"Twisted" is a 1952 vocalese song with lyrics by Annie Ross, set to a tenor saxophone solo of the same title by Wardell Gray that was recorded in 1949. It has been covered by Bette Midler, Joni Mitchell, and many others.

== Background ==
"Twisted" is a whimsical account of the protagonist's insanity that satirises psychoanalysis. In 1952, Ross met Prestige Records owner Bob Weinstock, who asked her to write lyrics to a jazz solo, in a similar way to King Pleasure, a practice that would later be known as vocalese. The next day, she presented him with "Twisted", a treatment of saxophonist Wardell Gray's 1949 composition of that name, a classic example of the genre. She later said of the inspiration for the song:

The title was infinite possibilities. You could marry anything to it and it was the name signified, "Twisted." And it just occurred to me that it would be good as a kind of song about an analyst.

The song, first released in 1952 and later collected on the album King Pleasure Sings/Annie Ross Sings, was an underground hit, and resulted in her winning DownBeat's New Star award. Writing for the magazine in a column devoted to analysing the song, Leonard Feather wrote: "To perform it, you need more qualifications than most singers today possess: a range as broad as that of the tenor sax itself, a natural feeling for chord changes, surety of pitch, and a beat. Annie Ross has 'em all." Ross released a second version with the vocalese trio Lambert, Hendricks & Ross on their 1960 album The Hottest New Group in Jazz. Gramophone described that recording as "more lighthearted, perhaps a little more individual" than Ross' first release of the song.

== Covers ==
=== Joni Mitchell ===
Joni Mitchell recorded the song on her 1974 album Court and Spark, featuring Cheech & Chong. In a 1974 interview, when asked why she covered the song, she said: "Because I love that song, I always have loved it. I went through analysis for a while this year and the song is about analysis. I figured that I earned the right to sing it. I tried to put it on the last record [For the Roses] but it was totally inappropriate. It had nothing to do with that time period and some of my friends feel it has nothing to do with this album either. It's added like an encore."

=== Others ===
Other covers include:

- Mark Murphy on his 1961 album Rah!
- Bette Midler on her 1973 self-titled album
- Marlena Shaw on her 1973 album Marlena Shaw Live at Montreux
- Crystal Waters on her 1991 album Surprise
- Jane Monheit on her 2000 album Never Never Land
- Emilie-Claire Barlow on her 2001 album Tribute

The song was part of the live repertoire of the New Journeymen, before they evolved into the Mamas & the Papas.

== In popular culture ==
- The original recording of the song was used in the opening credits to the 1997 Woody Allen film Deconstructing Harry.
