= Sing Along with Basie =

Studio album by Joe Williams, Lambert, Hendricks & Ross and the Basie Band
- Released: 1958
- Recorded: May 26–27, September 2–3, and October 15, 1958
- Studio: Capitol (New York City)
- Genre: Jazz
- Length: 34:33
- Label: Roulette; SR 52018
- Producer: Teddy Reig

Count Basie chronology
Basie Plays Hefti (1958)	Sing Along with Basie (1958)	Memories Ad-Lib (1958)

Lambert, Hendricks & Ross chronology
Sing a Song of Basie (1957)	Sing Along with Basie (1958)	The Swingers! (1959)

Sing Along with Basie is an album by vocalese jazz group Lambert, Hendricks & Ross with Joe Williams and the Count Basie Orchestra recorded in 1958 and originally released on the Roulette label.

== Reception ==
Professional ratings
Review scores
Source	Rating
AllMusic	4/5 stars

AllMusic awarded the album 4 stars and its review by Scott Yanow states: "it is quite fascinating to hear."

== Track listing ==
1. "Jumpin' at the Woodside" (Count Basie) – 3:18
2. "Goin' to Chicago Blues" (Basie, Jimmy Rushing) – 4:11
3. "Tickle Toe" (Lester Young) – 2:37
4. "Let Me See" (Basie, Harry Edison) – 3:13
5. "Every Tub" (Basie, Eddie Durham) – 3:23
6. "Shorty George" (Basie, Andy Gibson) – 3:06
7. "Rusty Dusty Blues" (J. Mayo Williams) – 3:44
8. "The King" (Basie) – 3:22
9. "Swingin' the Blues" (Basie, Durham) – 3:02
10. "Li'l Darlin'" (Neal Hefti) – 4:37

== Personnel ==
- Jon Hendricks, Dave Lambert, Annie Ross, Joe Williams – vocals
- Count Basie – piano
- Wendell Culley, Thad Jones, Joe Newman, Snooky Young – trumpet
- Henry Coker, Al Grey, Benny Powell – trombone
- Marshal Royal – alto saxophone, clarinet
- Frank Wess – alto saxophone, tenor saxophone, flute
- Frank Foster, Billy Mitchell – tenor saxophone
- Charlie Fowlkes – baritone saxophone
- Freddie Green – guitar
- Eddie Jones – bass
- Sonny Payne – drums
