= The Real Ambassadors =

- Original Cast Recording
- Music: Dave and Iola Brubeck; Louis Armstrong
- Productions: 1962 Monterey Jazz Festival

The Real Ambassadors is a jazz musical developed in the late 1950s and early 1960s by Dave and Iola Brubeck, in collaboration with Louis Armstrong and his band. It addressed the Civil Rights Movement, the music business, America's place in the world during the Cold War, the nature of God, and a number of other themes. It was set in a fictional African nation called Talgalla, and its central character was based on Armstrong and his time as a jazz ambassador. It was the first major large scale musical collaboration between Dave and Iola Brubeck and served as a template for their future musical collaborations. Songs from the musical were recorded by Columbia Records and a soundtrack album was released in 1962, just before the show's premiere at the 1962 Monterey Jazz Festival with an all star cast.

== Background ==
In writing this work, the Brubecks drew upon experiences they and their friends and colleagues had touring various parts of the world on behalf of the US State Department. The Brubecks and Armstrong (among many other musicians such as Dizzy Gillespie, Benny Goodman, and Duke Ellington) were part of a campaign by the State Department to spread American culture and music around the world during the Cold War, especially into countries whose allegiances were not well defined or that were perceived as being at risk of aligning with the Soviet Union. Fittingly, The Real Ambassadors was about the important role that musicians play as unofficial ambassadors for their countries.

Among the events referenced, directly or indirectly, were the 1956 student riots in Greece in which stones were thrown at the US Embassy, which dissipated following performances by Dizzy Gillespie; Louis Armstrong's 1956 visit to Ghana as the guest of Prime Minister Kwame Nkrumah; and Armstrong's dispute with the Eisenhower Administration and President Eisenhower personally over the handling of the 1957 Central High School Crisis in Little Rock, Arkansas.

== Recording and performance ==
The Real Ambassadors

Soundtrack album
- Released: 1962
- Recorded: September, December 1961
- Studio: Columbia 30th Street (New York City)
- Genre: Jazz
- Label: Columbia
- Producer: Teo Macero

Professional ratings
Review scores
Source	Rating
New Record Mirror	5/5 stars

The musical's soundtrack album was recorded in September and December 1961 in the Columbia Records recording studio on 30th Street in New York City, and was released the following year. It was produced by Teo Macero. Performers included Dave Brubeck and his band (including bassist Gene Wright and drummer Joe Morello, but not including saxophonist Paul Desmond); Louis Armstrong and his band (including trombonist Trummy Young, drummer Danny Barcelona, bassist Irving Manning, clarinetist Joe Darensbourg, and pianist Billy Kyle); vocalese group Lambert, Hendricks & Ross; and vocalist Carmen McRae. It was released on compact disc on June 14, 1994, by Sony's Legacy label.

The musical was performed in a cut-down version of 10 tunes, with Iola Brubeck narrating live, at the Monterey Jazz Festival in 1962 by Brubeck and his band; Armstrong and his band; Lambert, Hendricks & Ross; and Carmen McRae. Television cameras, though present, did not capture the performance. Forty years later, in 2002, The Real Ambassadors returned to the Monterey Jazz Festival, this time featuring the Dave Brubeck Quartet, Lizz Wright, Roy Hargrove, and Christian McBride. Archival footage of this performance is available through the Monterey Jazz Festival Collection at Stanford University. The first revival of the musical was presented at the 2013 Detroit Jazz Festival with Bill Meyer using the same format of a concert performance with narrator as the Brubecks had staged at Monterey. It was next performed in New York City for the first time, in 2014, at Jazz at Lincoln Center, featuring the original vocalist who performed at the Monterey premiere, Yolande Bavan, this time in the role of Narrator. Connecticut jazz vocalist Dianne Mower has been making efforts to bring about a Broadway revival of the show. A slide/vocal clip of Louis Armstrong singing the title tune at Monterey can be found here. Songs from the album were performed through the Louis Armstrong House in 2021, with narration by Alphonso Horne and featuring footage in both the Brubeck and Armstrong homes, which can be viewed on Youtube.

== Social impact ==
The Real Ambassadors was able to capture the often complicated, and sometimes contradictory, politics of the State Departments tours during the Cold War Era. Addressing African and Asian nation building in addition to the US civil rights struggle, it satirically portrayed the international politics of the tour. The musical also addressed the prevailing racial issues of the day, but did so within the context of witty satire. Below is an excerpt of Armstrong's opening lines to the piece "They Say I Look Like God".

They say I look like God.
Could God be black? My God!
If all are made in the image of thee,
Could thou perchance a zebra be?

He's watchin' all the Earth.
He's watched us from our birth.
And if He cared if you black or white,
He'd a mixed one color, one just right.
Black or white... One just right...

— Louis Armstrong, The Real Ambassadors, "They Say I Look Like God".

Despite Iola Brubeck's intention for some of her lyrics to be light and humorous in presentation, believing that some of the messages would be better received if presented in a satirical manner, Armstrong saw this performance as an opportunity for him to address many of the racial issues that he had struggled with for his entire career, and he made a request to sing the song straight. In one 2009 interview with Dave Brubeck, he remarked on Armstrong's seriousness: "Now, we wanted the audience to chuckle about the ridiculous segregation, but Louis was cryin'... and every time we wanted Louis to loosen up, he'd sing 'I'm really free. Thank God Almighty, I'm really free'." After years of demeaning roles in his public performances, the collaboration in The Real Ambassadors offered Armstrong material that was closer to his own sensibility and outlook.

The studio recording was finished in just one take, and everyone in the studio was "crying their eyes out" by the end of the performance. Armstrong's straight performance of Iola's lyrics, combined with Brubeck's subtle piano comping and gorgeous background vocals performed by Lambert, Hendricks, and Ross created a powerful, emotional musical experience for all involved.

Later, at the live performance of "The Real Ambassadors" with Armstrong at the 1962 Monterey Jazz Festival, Lambert, Hendricks, and Bavan put sackcloths and hoods over their heads (which they lifted before singing) just before beginning "They Say I Look Like God". The performance was not filmed, and Brubeck always regretted not having had the cash on hand to pay the festival's $750 fee to record the performance, stating that it was a "terrible goof" that the live performance wasn't filmed.

== Releases and catalog numbers ==
- Columbia OL 5850 (1962)
- Columbia CBS 57035 (UK)
- Sony/CBS 467140 (1990 "I Love Jazz" CD reissue)
- Sony/CBS Legacy CK 57663 (US CD reissue)

== Track listing ==
1. "Everybody's Comin' ["Everybody's Jumpin' "]" (1:45)
2. "Cultural Exchange" (4:38)
3. "Good Reviews" (2:05)
4. "Remember Who You Are" (2:29)
5. "My One Bad Habit" (2:37)
6. "Lonesome" (2:24) *
7. "Summer Song" (3:14)
8. "King for a Day" (3:40)
9. "Blow Satchmo" (0:44)
10. "The Real Ambassadors" (3:08)
11. "Nomad" (2:51) *
12. "In The Lurch ['Two Part Contention' theme]" (2:28)
13. "One Moment Worth Years" (4:17)
14. "You Swing Baby ['The Duke']" (2:31) *
15. "Summer Song" (2:32) *
16. "They Say I Look Like God" (5:26)
17. "I Didn't Know Until You Told Me" (2:58)
18. "Since Love Had Its Way" (2:31)
19. "Easy As You Go" (2:32) *
20. "Swing Bells / Blow Satchmo / Finale ['Watusi Drums' theme and 'Blow Satchmo (reprise)']" (6:05)

Asterisked selections appeared on the 1994 CD release, but not on the original LP release. All songs by Dave Brubeck and Iola Brubeck - except "My One Bad Habit" is by Dave Brubeck, Iola Brubeck and Ella Fitzgerald.
