= Tony Kinsey =

English jazz drummer and composer (1927–2025)

- Born: Cyril Anthony Kinsey; 11 October 1927; Sutton Coldfield, Birmingham, England
- Died: 9 February 2025 (aged 97)
- Genres: Jazz
- Occupation(s): Musician; Composer
- Instrument: Drums
- Years active: 1950–2025
- Labels: Decca; Parlophone; KPM Music; Boosey and Hawkes; Spotlight Music

Cyril Anthony Kinsey (11 October 1927 – 9 February 2025) was an English jazz drummer and composer.

== Early life ==
Kinsey was born in Sutton Coldfield, Birmingham, England on 11 October 1927. He held jobs on trans-Atlantic ships while young, studying while at port with Bill West in New York City and with local musician Tommy Webster in Birmingham. He had a close association with Ronnie Ball early in his life; the two even had a double wedding together.

== Career ==
Kinsey led his own ensemble at the Flamingo Club in London through the 1950s, and recorded on more than 80 sessions between 1950 and 1977, including with Tubby Hayes, Bill Le Sage, Ronnie Scott, Johnny Dankworth, Tommy Whittle, Joe Harriott, Lena Horne, Frank Holder, Ella Fitzgerald, Ben Webster, Clark Terry, Harry Edison, Buddy DeFranco, Billie Holiday, Oscar Peterson, and Sarah Vaughan. He performed at European jazz festivals both as a drummer and as a poet. He did some work as a session musician in the 1950s and 1960s, playing on records by Eddie Calvert, Cliff Richard, and Ronnie Aldrich. Kinsey was also a founder member of The John Dankworth Seven in 1950.

He was a resident at the Florida Club, Leicester Square, in the 1950s and had his own trio from 1963 to 1965. In the mid-1980s, he performed regularly with jazz vibraphone player Lennie Best at venues in the London area, including the South Hill Park Cellar Bar in Bracknell.

Kinsey also branched into composition; a string quartet composition of his is used in the short film On the Bridge, and he wrote arrangements for big bands in addition to music for over 100 commercials. His Quintet for string quartet and harmonica, "Reflections", has been recorded by Gianluca Littera and the Quartetto Energie Nove. Later in his life, Kinsey wrote music for a musical based on the life of George Eliot.

In 2012, Kinsey appeared in the documentary film No One But Me, discussing jazz musician Annie Ross.

== Personal life and death ==
Kinsey was a member of the Masonic Lodge and Chapter of Asaph 1319 and was presented with his 50 years Certificates for both by Lt Col Stephen Braden PAGSwB on 3 April 2023.

Kinsey died on 9 February 2025, at the age of 97.
