= Al Haig =

American jazz pianist (1922–1982)

Background information
- Born: Alan Warren Haig; July 19, 1922; Newark, New Jersey, U.S.
- Died: November 16, 1982 (aged 60) New York City, New York
- Genres: Jazz, bebop
- Occupation: Musician
- Instrument: Piano
- Years active: 1944–1982
- Labels: New Jazz, Spotlite

Alan Warren Haig (July 19, 1922 – November 16, 1982) was an American jazz pianist, best known as one of the pioneers of bebop.

== Biography ==
Haig was born in Newark, New Jersey, and raised in nearby Nutley. In 1940, he majored in piano at Oberlin College. He started performing with Dizzy Gillespie and Charlie Parker in 1945, and performed and recorded under Gillespie from 1945 to 1946, as a member of Eddie Davis and His Beboppers in 1946 (also featuring Fats Navarro), and the Eddie Davis Quintet in 1947, under Parker from 1948 to 1950, and under Stan Getz from 1949 to 1951. The Gillespie quintet, which included Haig, recorded four 78 r.p.m. sides for Guild Records in May 1945 which are regarded as the first recordings to demonstrate all elements of the mature bebop style. He was part of the nonet on the first session of Miles Davis' Birth of the Cool.

For much of the 1950s and 1960s, "Haig was all but a forgotten giant", in Brian Case's words; "Jazz pianism, ever more percussive in a crass simplification of [Bud] Powell's methods, had no room for the crystalline touch and swift, logical turnover of ideas. Haig got by with semi-cocktail piano in New York bars." Although Haig is best remembered for playing bebop, he spent much of his career playing in non-jazz contexts. His work was the subject of a revival in the 1970s.

In 1969, Haig was acquitted of a murder charge. He had been accused of strangling his third wife, Bonnie, at their home in Clifton, New Jersey, on October 9, 1968. He had said in evidence that his wife had been drunk, and had died in a fall down a flight of stairs. Grange Rutan, Haig's second wife, challenged Haig's account in her 2007 book, Death of a Bebop Wife. Rutan's book is partly autobiographical, partly based on interviews with friends and family members. She describes Bonnie's story in detail, depicting an underside to Haig that included a history of serial domestic abuse. Rutan observed that several family members sounded alarm bells regarding Haig's violent personality that went unheeded. She quotes bassist Hal Gaylor, who was talking with Haig before a performance at the Edison Hotel lounge in the early seventies, when Haig admitted to him he had caused Bonnie's death.

In 1974, Haig was invited to tour Europe by Tony Williams, owner of Spotlite Records in the United Kingdom. At the end of a very successful tour he recorded the Invitation album for Spotlite with Bibi Rovère on bass and Kenny Clarke on drums. This kick-started his re-emergence and, over the next eight years, he built a strong following in Europe and toured several times, recording in the UK and France, and appearing elsewhere. He also recorded for several Japanese labels.

Haig died from a heart attack on November 16, 1982, and was survived by his wife Joanne and his sons Alan and Daniel.

== Discography ==
=== As leader ===
Year recorded	Title	Label	Personnel/Notes
1952?	Live in Hollywood	Xanadu	With Chet Baker (trumpet), Sonny Criss (alto sax), Jack Montrose (tenor sax); in concert
1954	Al Haig Trio	Esoteric	Trio, with Bill Crow (bass), Lee Abrams (drums)
1954	Al Haig Trio	Period	Trio, with Bill Crow (bass), Lee Abrams (drums)
1954?	Al Haig Quartet	Period	Quartet, with Benny Weeks(guitar), Teddy Kotick(bass), Phil Brown(drums)
1965	Al Haig Today!	Mint	Trio, with Eddie De Haas (bass), Jim Kappes (drums)
1974	Invitation	Spotlite	Trio, with Gilbert Rovere (bass), Kenny Clarke (drums)
1974	Special Brew	Spotlite	Quartet, with Jimmy Raney (guitar), Wilbur Little (bass), Frank Gant (drums)
1975	Strings Attached	Choice	Quartet, with Jimmy Raney (guitar), Jamil Nasser (bass), Frank Gant (drums)
1975	Chelsea Bridge	East Wind	Trio, with Jamil Nasser (bass), Billy Higgins (drums)
1976	Piano Interpretation	Sea Breeze	Solo piano
1976	Piano Time	Sea Breeze	Solo piano
1976	Duke 'n' Bird	East Wind	Solo piano
1976	Interplay	Sea Breeze	Duo, with Jamil Nasser (bass)
1977?	Serendipity	Interplay	
1977	I Love you	Interplay	Trio, with Jamil Nasser (bass), Jimmy Wormworth (drums)
1977	Manhattan Memories	Sea Breeze	Some tracks trio, with Jamil Nasser (bass), Jimmy Wormworth (drums); some tracks quartet, with Nasser (bass), Eddie Diehl (guitar), Frank Gant (drums)
1977	A Portrait of Bud Powell	Interplay	Trio, with Jamil Nasser (bass), Frank Gant (drums)
1977	Reminiscence, Ornithology	Progressive	Trio, with Jamil Nasser (bass), Frank Gant (drums)
1977?	Parisian Thoroughfare	Musica	
1977?	Al in Paris	Musica	
1978	Plays the Music of Jerome Kern	Gitanes	Some tracks duo, with Jamil Nasser (bass); some tracks solo; one track duo, with Helen Merrill
1978	Un Poco Loco	Spotlite	Trio, with Jamil Nasser (bass), Tony Mann (Anthony Arnold Pritchard) (drums)
1978	Expressly Ellington	Spotlite	Quartet, with Art Themen (tenor sax), Jamil Nasser (bass), Tony Mann (drums)
1980	Blue Manhattan	Interplay	Trio, with Reggie Johnson (bass), Frank Gant (drums)
1982	Bebop Live	Spotlite	With Art Themen (soprano sax, tenor sax), Peter King (alto sax), Kenny Baldock (bass), Allan Ganley (drums); in concert

=== As sideman ===
With Chet Baker

- Chet Baker in New York (Riverside, 1958)

With Miles Davis

- Birth of the Cool (Capitol, 1949)

With Miles Davis, Stan Getz and Lee Konitz

- Conception (Prestige, 1956)

With Dizzy Gillespie

- The Complete RCA Victor Recordings (Bluebird, 1937–1949 [1995])

With Stan Getz

- Stan Getz Quartets (Prestige, 1949–50 [1955])
- Prezervation (Prestige, 1949–50)
- The Complete Roost Recordings (Blue Note, 1950–54 [1997]) (includes Stan Getz at Storyville Vol 1 and Stan Getz at Storyville Vol 2)

With Phil Woods

- The Young Bloods (Prestige, 1956) with Donald Byrd

Main sources:
