= Ray Abrams =

Ray Abrams may refer to:

- Ray Abrams (musician) (1920–1992), American jazz and jump blues tenor saxophonist
- Ray Abrams (animator) (1906–1981), American animator and director
