= Basin Street East =

Coordinates: 40°45′19.7″N 73°58′22.1″W

Basin Street East was a notable nightclub of the 1960s in New York City. Several live albums were recorded there, including Peggy Lee's Basin Street East Proudly Presents Miss Peggy Lee (1961), and Billy Eckstine's At Basin St. East (1961).

The club was located in the then-Shelton Towers Hotel (more recently known as the New York Marriott East Side), and replaced a previous club in the hotel called Casa Cugat. Basin Street East operated from 1959 to 1967.

== Basin Street East live recordings ==
- Jazz: Red Hot and Cool — Dave Brubeck Quartet (Columbia, 1955)
- Flautista! — Herbie Mann (Verve, 1959)
- At Basin Street East Billy Eckstine and Quincy Jones — (EmArcy, 1961)
- Basin Street East Proudly Presents Miss Peggy Lee — Peggy Lee (Capitol, 1961)
- Take Five Live — Dave Brubeck Quartet and Carmen McRae (Columbia, 1961)
- Recorded "Live" at Basin Street East — Lambert, Hendricks & Bavan (RCA, 1963)
- The Liveliest at Basin Street East — Vic Damone (Capitol, 1963)
- Live at Basin Street East and Cold Turkey — Ray Bryant (Sue, 1964)
- Della Reese at Basin Street East — Della Reese (RCA, 1964)
- Live at the Basin St. East — Trini Lopez (Reprise, 1964)
- Gloria Lynne at Basin Street East (Everest, 1962)

== See also ==
- Albums recorded at Basin Street East
- Basin Street West
