= Stan Getz Quartets =

Studio album by Stan Getz
- Released: 1955
- Recorded: June 21, 1949, January 6 and April 14, 1950; New York City
- Genre: Jazz
- Length: 40:54 CD reissue with bonus tracks
- Labels: Prestige; PRLP 7002
- Producer: Bob Weinstock

Stan Getz chronology
| Prezervation (1949-50) | Stan Getz Quartets (1955) | The Getz Age (1950) |

Stan Getz Quartets is an album by saxophonist Stan Getz recorded at sessions in 1949 and 1950 and first released as an LP on the Prestige label in 1955.

== Reception ==
AllMusic stated: "At the time, Getz's cool, Lester Young-inspired sound was becoming more distinct and harmonically varied, featuring the beautifully mellifluous tone he would soon turn into his trademark. Getz's airy approach is optimally heard on Quartets' many ballad standards".

Professional ratings
Review scores
| Source | Rating |
|---|---|
| Allmusic | 4.5/5 stars |
| The Penguin Guide to Jazz Recordings | 3/4 stars |

== Track listing ==
1. "There's a Small Hotel" (Richard Rodgers, Lorenz Hart) – 2:56
2. "I've Got You Under My Skin" (Cole Porter) – 3:16
3. "What's New?" (Bob Haggart, Johnny Burke) – 3:21
4. "Too Marvelous for Words" (Richard A. Whiting, Johnny Mercer) – 2:56
5. "You Stepped Out of a Dream" (Nacio Herb Brown, Gus Kahn) – 2:54
6. "My Old Flame" (Sam Coslow, Arthur Johnston) – 2:44
7. "My Old Flame" [alternate take] (Coslow, Johnston) – 2:44 Bonus track on CD reissue
8. "Long Island Sound" (Stan Getz) – 2:58
9. "Indian Summer" (Victor Herbert, Al Dubin) – 2:50
10. "Mar-cia" [a.k.a. "Marcia"] (Getz) – 2:43
11. "Crazy Chords" (Getz) – 2:36
12. "The Lady in Red" (Allie Wrubel, Mort Dixon) – 3:16
13. "The Lady in Red" [alternate take] (Wrubel, Dixon) – 3:17 Bonus track on CD reissue
14. "Wrap Your Troubles in Dreams" (Harry Barris, Ted Koehler, Billy Moll) – 3:02
- Recorded in New York City on June 21, 1949 (tracks 8–11), January 6, 1950 (tracks 1–4) and April 14, 1950 (tracks 5–7 & 12–14)

== Personnel ==
- Stan Getz – tenor saxophone
- Tony Aless (tracks 5–7 & 12–14), Al Haig (tracks 1–4 & 8–11) – piano
- Percy Heath (tracks 5–7 & 12–14), Tommy Potter (tracks 1–4), Gene Ramey (tracks 8–11) – bass
- Roy Haynes (tracks 1–4), Don Lamond (tracks 5–7 & 12–14), Stan Levey (tracks 8–11) – drums
