= Never Never Land (Jane Monheit album) =

Studio album by Jane Monheit
- Released: May 9, 2000
- Recorded: January 13–14, 2000
- Genre: Jazz, vocal jazz
- Length: 46:15
- Label: N-Coded
- Producer: Joel Dorn, Carl Griffin

Jane Monheit chronology
Never Never Land	Come Dream with Me

Never Never Land is the debut album by jazz singer Jane Monheit, recorded when she was 22 years old. At AllMusic, critic David Adler wrote that her voice on this album was "as close to flawless as a human can get". She was accompanied by jazz musicians Bucky Pizzarelli, Ron Carter, Hank Crawford, and Kenny Barron. The album includes cover versions of the standards "More Than You Know", "My Foolish Heart", and "Twisted".

== Track listing ==
No.	Title	Writer(s)	Length
1.	"Please Be Kind"	Saul Chaplin, Sammy Cahn	3:43
2.	"Detour Ahead"	Herb Ellis, Johnny Frigo, Lou Carter	6:30
3.	"More Than You Know"	Vincent Youmans, Billy Rose, Edward Eliscu	3:04
4.	"Dindi"	Antônio Carlos Jobim, Aloísio de Oliveira, Ray Gilbert	4:52
5.	"Save Your Love for Me"	Buddy Johnson	5:21
6.	"Never Let Me Go"	Ray Evans, Jay Livingston	4:00
7.	"My Foolish Heart"	Victor Young, Ned Washington	4:32
8.	"I Got It Bad (and That Ain't Good)"	Duke Ellington, Paul Francis Webster	6:15
9.	"Twisted"	Wardell Gray, Annie Ross	4:01
10.	"Never Never Land"	Betty Comden, Adolph Green, Jule Styne	3:57

== Personnel ==
- Jane Monheit – vocals, vocal arrangement
- Kenny Barron – piano
- Bucky Pizzarelli – guitar
- Ron Carter – bass guitar
- Lewis Nash – drums
- David "Fathead" Newman – flute, tenor saxophone
- Hank Crawford – alto saxophone

Production

- Joel Dorn – producer
- Carl Griffin – executive producer
- Tom Shick – engineer, mixing
- Todd Parker – assistant engineer
- Gene Paul – mastering, mixing
- David Berkman – arranger
- Peter Eldridge – arranger
