= Al Haig Trio (Esoteric) =

Studio album by Al Haig
- Released: August 25, 1954
- Recorded: March 13, 1954
- Genre: Bebop
- Label: Esoteric; Rerelease: Fresh Sound

Professional ratings
Review scores
Source	Rating
Allmusic	3/5 stars
Penguin Guide to Jazz	👑

Al Haig Trio is a 1954 jazz album released by Al Haig on the Esoteric records label; in later rereleases it is therefore often known as Esoteric or The Al Haig Trio Esoteric.

== Background ==
The album is notable as being one of three that Haig released as leader in 1954, the final year of his first period of success. There followed some twenty years of obscurity, broken in the later 1970s, when he was finally recognised as an important pioneer of bebop, and began to be recorded again.

This album contains thirteen sides, and was awarded a crown in Cook and Morton's The Penguin Guide to Jazz.

== Track listing ==
1. "Autumn in New York" (5:17)
2. "Isn't It Romantic?" (3:38)
3. "They Can't Take That Away from Me" (2:52)
4. "Royal Garden Blues" (2:44)
5. "Don't Blame Me" (2:46)
6. "Moonlight in Vermont" (3:43)
7. "If I Should Lose You" (3:34)
8. "April in Paris" (2:15)
9. "All God's Chillun Got Rhythm" (2:20)
10. "Body and Soul" (4:55)
11. "Gone with the Wind" (2:59)
12. "My Old Flame" (2:58)
13. "On the Alamo" (3:34)

== Personnel ==
- Al Haig – piano
- Bill Crow – double bass
- Lee Abrams – drums
