= Manhattan Memories =

Studio album by Al Haig Trio and Quartet
- Released: 1983
- Recorded: February 18 and July 12, 1977
- Studio: RCA Studios, NYC
- Genre: Jazz
- Length: 37:23
- Label: Sea Breeze; SB-1008
- Producer: Toshiya Taenaka

Al Haig chronology
| A Portrait of Bud Powell (1977) | Manhattan Memories (1983) | Reminiscence (1978) |

Manhattan Memories, is an album by jazz pianist Al Haig featuring trio and quartet recorded in 1977 and released on the short-lived Sea Breeze label in 1983.

== Reception ==
Professional ratings
Review scores
| Source | Rating |
|---|---|
| Allmusic | 3/5 stars |

The Allmusic review by Scott Yanow states, "Haig's style was largely unchanged from his earlier prime although he had grown as a player".

== Track listing ==
1. "Tea Dreams" (Joe Kennedy) – 6:24
2. "Come Sunday" (Duke Ellington) – 7:12
3. "I'll Keep Loving" (Bud Powell) – 3:20
4. "Manhattan Memories" (Al Haig, Toshiya Taenaka) – 4:20
5. "My Little Brown Book" (Billy Strayhorn) – 6:22
6. "Voices Within Me" (Cedar Walton) – 5:00
7. "Nuages" (Django Reinhardt) – 4:45

== Personnel ==
- Al Haig – piano
- Jamil Nasser – bass
- Frank Gant (tracks 4–7), Jimmy Wormworth (tracks 1–3) – drums
- Eddie Diehl – guitar (tracks 4–7)
