= Once More with Feeling (Billy Eckstine album) =

Studio album by Billy Eckstine
- Released: 1960
- Recorded: January 28–29, 1960
- Genre: Traditional pop; Jazz
- Length: 42:47
- Label: Roulette SR 5104
- Producer: Teddy Reig

Billy Eckstine chronology
No Cover, No Minimum (1960)	Once More with Feeling (1960)	Broadway, Bongos and Mr. B (1961)

Once More with Feeling is a 1960 studio album by the American singer Billy Eckstine. It was arranged by Billy May and produced by Teddy Reig.

== Reception ==
Professional ratings
Review scores
Source	Rating
AllMusic	3/5 stars
The Penguin Guide to Jazz Recordings	3.5/4 stars

In his review for AllMusic, John Bush wrote that Eckstine was "looking back more than forward by 1960" and highlighted the re-recordings of older Eckstine hits and film theme songs on the album. Bush added:

It may read like a desultory date, and indeed it would have been if not for the presence of a solid jazz band and the surprisingly sympathetic arrangements of big-brass auteur Billy May. Eckstine had fronted some strong bands in the past and consequently doesn't need to strain his voice to equal the energy behind May's charts, even on unexpected swingers like "Stormy Weather" and "I Hear a Rhapsody." "I Apologize," one of the two remakes, is treated with glimmering strings that certainly suggest the '40s but work in the context of the adult-pop era as well.

Billboard magazine gave Once More with Feeling four stars in March 1960, and wrote that "Mr. B is in as fine fettle here as he's been for some time...Old friends of Eckstein's [sic] will really go for this and he stands to make some new fans as well".

== Track listing ==
1. "Once More with Feeling" (Billy Eckstine) - 3:02
2. "Stormy Weather" (Harold Arlen, Ted Koehler) - 3:55
3. "A Cottage for Sale" (Larry Conley, Willard Robison) - 3:26
4. "Blues in the Night" (Arlen, Johnny Mercer) - 3:09
5. "I Hear a Rhapsody" (Jack Baker, George Fragos, Dick Gasparre) - 2:37
6. "As Time Goes By" (Herman Hupfeld) - 3:24
7. "That Old Black Magic" (Arlen, Mercer) - 3:18
8. "I Apologize" (Al Hoffman, Ed Nelson, Al Goodhart) - 3:19
9. "I Love You" (Cole Porter) - 2:40
10. "With Every Breath I Take" (Ralph Rainger, Leo Robin) - 3:22
11. "Secret Love" (Sammy Fain, Paul Francis Webster) - 3:19
12. "I'm Beginning to See the Light" (Johnny Hodges, Harry James, Duke Ellington, Don George) - 2:35
13. "Anything You Wanna Do (I Wanna Do with You)" (Phil Medley, Ray Passman) - 2:26
14. "Like Wow" (Eckstine) - 2:15

== Personnel ==
- Billy Eckstine - vocals, trumpet
- Billy May - conductor, arranger
- Joe Reisman - arranger
- Red Callender, Mike Rubin - double bass
- Irving Cottler - drums
- Bobby Gibbons - guitar
- Milt Raskin, Jimmy Rowles - piano
- Arthur Gleghorn - flute
- Jack Cave, Jim Decker, Vincent DeRosa - french horn
- Buddy Collette, Jules Jacob, Ronnie Lang - woodwind
- Benny Carter, Wilbur Schwartz - alto saxophone
- Fred Falensby, Justin Gordon - tenor saxophone
- Eddie Kusby, Dick Noel, Bill Schaeffer, Lloyd Ulyate - trombone
- Pete Candoli, Conrad Gozzo, Uan Rasey, Joe Triscari - trumpet
- Phil Stephen - tuba

Production

- Phil Macy, Al Schmitt - engineer
- Donald Elfman - liner notes
- Malcolm Addey - mastering, remixing
- Michael Cuscuna - reissue producer
- Teddy Reig - producer
