= Sing a Song of Basie =

Studio album by Lambert, Hendricks & Ross
- Released: 1958
- Recorded: August 26 – November 26, 1957
- Genre: Jazz
- Length: 30:08
- Label: Am-Par
- Producer: Creed Taylor

Lambert, Hendricks & Ross chronology
Sing a Song of Basie (1958)	Sing Along with Basie (1958)

Professional ratings
Review scores
Source	Rating
AllMusic	5/5 stars
Disc	5/5 stars
The Penguin Guide to Jazz Recordings	3.5/4 stars
The Rolling Stone Jazz Record Guide	4/5 stars

Sing a Song of Basie is the 1958 debut album by Lambert, Hendricks & Ross.

== Track listing ==
1. "Every Day I Have the Blues" (Memphis Slim) – 5:18
2. "It's Sand, Man!" (Hendricks, Lambert, Ed Lewis) – 2:27
3. "Two for the Blues" (Neal Hefti, Hendricks) – 2:42
4. "One O'Clock Jump" (Count Basie, Eddie Durham) – 3:00
5. "Little Pony" (Hefti, Hendricks) – 2:28
6. "Down for Double" (Freddie Green, Hendricks, Lambert) – 2:11
7. "Fiesta in Blue" (Benny Goodman, Hendricks, Lambert, Jimmy Mundy) – 3:14
8. "Down for the Count" (Frank Foster, Melissa Ritter) – 2:58
9. "Blues Backstage" (Foster) – 2:58
10. "Avenue C" (Buck Clayton, Hendricks, Lambert) – 2:52

== Personnel ==
- Lambert, Hendricks & Ross – vocals
  - Dave Lambert
  - Jon Hendricks
  - Annie Ross
- Nat Pierce – piano
- Freddie Green – guitar
- Eddie Jones – double bass
- Sonny Payne – drums
