= Buddy Stewart =

American jazz singer (1922–1950)

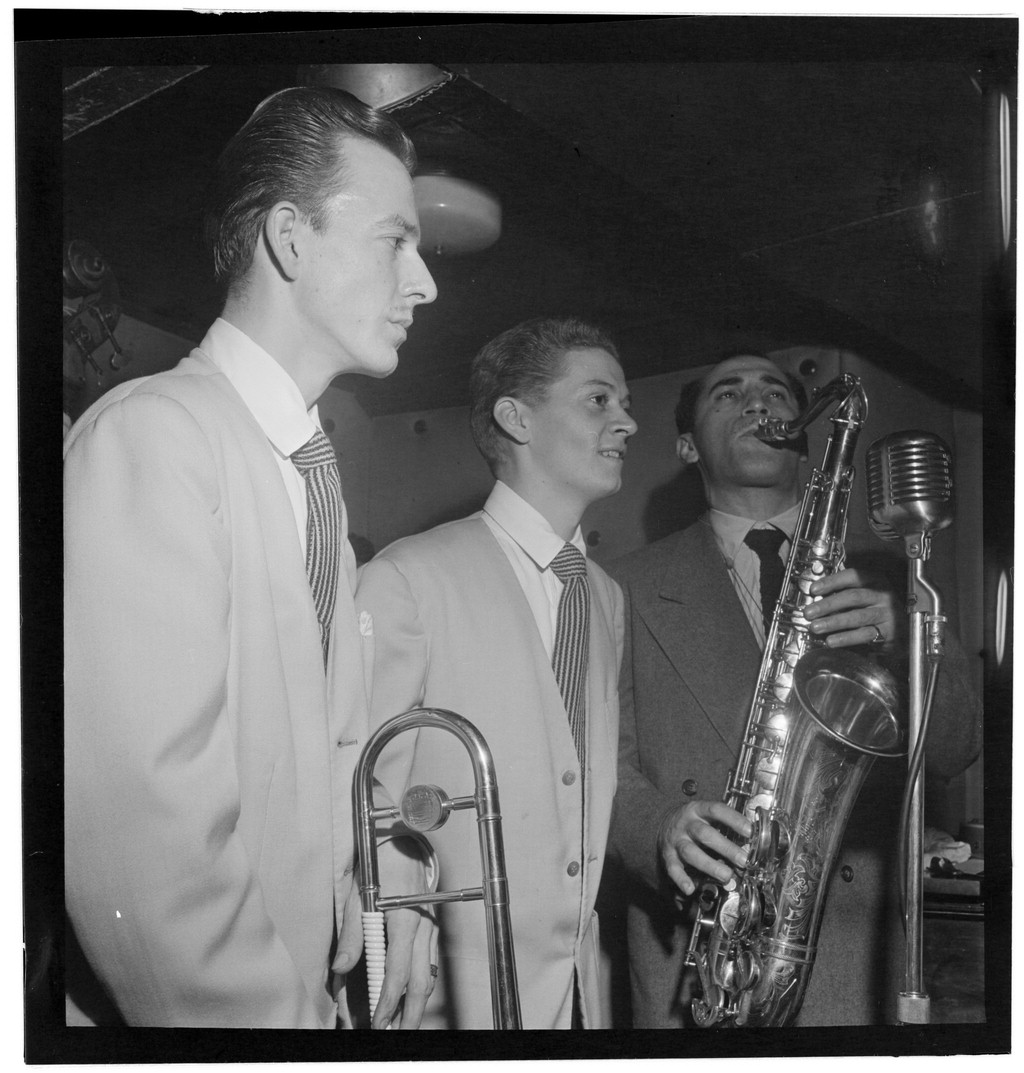

Background information
- Birth name: Albert James Byrne Jr.
- Born: September 22, 1922; Derry, New Hampshire
- Died: February 1, 1950 (aged 27); Deming, New Mexico
- Genres: Vocal jazz, swing
- Occupation: Musician
- Years active: 1930–1950

Buddy Stewart (born Albert James Byrne Jr.; September 22, 1922 – February 1, 1950) was an American jazz singer. His stage name appears as "Stewart" in The Jazz Discography. Other sources use "Stuart".

== Biography ==
Stewart's parents were dancers, and he first performed on the vaudeville stage at the age of eight. He sang in vocal groups, including the 1940s group The Snowflakes where he sang with the Claude Thornhill orchestra. In 1942, he appeared in soundies with Martha Wayne and the Thornhill orchestra.

After serving in the U.S. Army from March 1942 to 1944, he sang with the Gene Krupa orchestra, sometimes as a member of The G-Noters. In 1945, Stewart and Dave Lambert sang together on "What's This?" in the scat style. Stewart remained with Krupa through 1946, often singing alongside Anita O'Day and Carolyn Grey. In 1947 he recorded with the Charlie Ventura orchestra for Savoy. He began recording as a solo act in 1948, as a co-leader with Kai Winding, and in 1949 with the Charlie Barnet orchestra. He also recorded with Blossom Dearie and Charlie Parker.

In 1950, he was killed in a car accident while traveling to New Mexico to see his wife and child. To assist Stewart's widow, a benefit concert was performed at the Birdland Jazz Club in New York City. Performers included Ella Fitzgerald, Charlie Ventura, Stan Getz, Tony Scott, Al Cohn, Lester Young, Lennie Tristano, Harry Belafonte, J. J. Johnson, Charlie Parker, John Coltrane, and Dizzy Gillespie.
