= Jon Hendricks =

American jazz lyricist and singer (1921–2017)

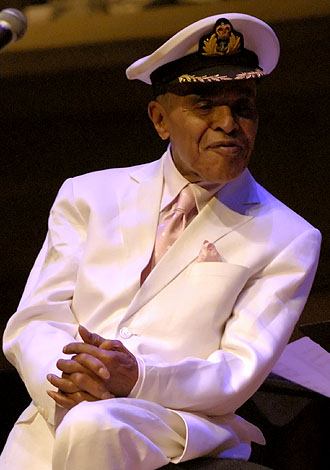
- Hendricks in 2008

Background information
- Born: John Carl Hendricks; September 16, 1921; Newark, Ohio, U.S.
- Died: November 22, 2017 (aged 96) New York City, U.S.
- Genres: Jazz
- Occupations: Singer, lyricist
- Years active: 1957–2017
- Formerly of: Lambert, Hendricks & Ross
- Spouses: Colleen Moore (divorced); Judith Hendricks (death 2015)
- Children: 4

John Carl Hendricks (September 16, 1921 – November 22, 2017), known professionally as Jon Hendricks, was an American jazz lyricist and singer. He is one of the originators of vocalese, which adds lyrics to existing instrumental songs and replaces many instruments with vocalists, such as the big-band arrangements of Duke Ellington and Count Basie. He is considered one of the best practitioners of scat singing, which involves vocal jazz soloing. Jazz critic and historian Leonard Feather called him the "Poet Laureate of Jazz", while Time dubbed him the "James Joyce of Jive". Al Jarreau called him "pound-for-pound the best jazz singer on the planet—maybe that's ever been".

== Early years ==
Born on September 16, 1921, in Newark, Ohio, United States, Hendricks moved many times with his 14 siblings, following their father's assignments as an AME pastor, before settling permanently in Toledo. The family house was often full of visiting jazz musicians, for whom Jon's mother provided meals.

Hendricks began his singing career at the age of seven. He has said: "By the time I was 10, I was a local celebrity in Toledo. I had offers to go with Fats Waller when I was 12, and offers to go with Ted Lewis and be his shadow when I was 13. He had that song 'Me and My Shadow'. And he had this little Negro boy who was his shadow, that did everything he did. That was his act." The Tatum family lived on the same street as the Hendricks family. Jon Hendricks received his early musical training from piano prodigy Art Tatum, and the two of them began appearing together around town.

As a teenager, Jon made good money from singing on the radio with a harmony group, The Swing Buddies. This earned him enough money to support his entire family. He continued performing around Toledo and Detroit until he was drafted into the US Army.

== World War II ==
As a soldier during World War II, Hendricks took part in the D-Day landings of June 1944, and was later attached to the quartermaster's headquarters in France. When he and some black fellow soldiers were shot at by white US military police for consorting with white French women, they went on the run with truckloads of army supplies, remaining at large until eventually recaptured and court-martialled in November 1945. By then the war was over, and Hendricks served only 11 months in the stockade before returning home to attend University of Toledo on the G.I. Bill as a pre-law major. Just when he was about to enter the graduate law program, the G.I. benefits ran out. Jon met his first wife Colleen "Connie" Moore in Toledo. They were married and eventually had four children. One night in 1950, Hendricks got up and scatted at a Charlie Parker gig in Toledo. Parker encouraged him to come to New York and look him up. Hendricks moved his family there two years later and resumed his singing career.

== Lambert, Hendricks and Ross ==
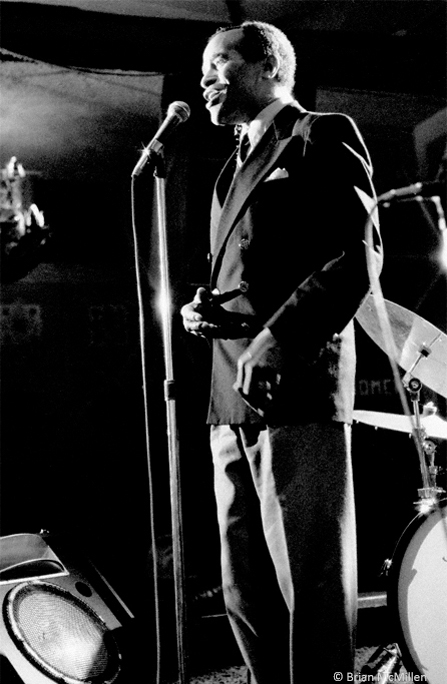
Hendricks at the Keystone Korner in San Francisco, 1983

After several years, during which he wrote several songs for Louis Jordan and recorded with King Pleasure, he teamed up with Dave Lambert, who conceived the idea to record a selection of Count Basie's instrumental numbers with voices replacing the Basie orchestra's wind instruments. Jon wrote the lyrics, and they sold the idea to Creed Taylor, who had recently started working as an A&R man for ABC-Paramount Ampar. After a disastrous initial attempt to record the songs with a choir, they decided to multi-track their own voices, with Annie Ross providing the high notes. It was not the first time the technique of overdubbing had been used, but it was an early and innovative example. The result was a best-selling album, Sing a Song of Basie (1958). Its success prompted them to form the legendary vocal trio Lambert, Hendricks & Ross (LH&R). With Hendricks as lyricist and Lambert as arranger, the trio perfected the art of vocalese and took it around the world, earning them numerous awards and accolades. In September 1959, they appeared on the cover of DownBeat magazine under the headline "The Hottest New Group in Jazz", which they adopted as the title of their Grammy-nominated fourth album.

Hendricks typically wrote lyrics not just to melodies but to entire instrumental solos, a notable example being his take on Ben Webster's tenor saxophone solo on Duke Ellington's original recording of "Cotton Tail", as featured on the album Lambert, Hendricks and Ross Sing Ellington (1960). His lyrics to Benny Golson's "I Remember Clifford" have been recorded by several other vocalists, including Dinah Washington, Carmen McRae, Nancy Wilson, Ray Charles, The Manhattan Transfer and Helen Merrill.

From 1957 through 1962, the trio recorded six albums, including High Flying (1961), which won a Grammy for Best Performance by a Vocal Group, before Annie Ross departed due to health problems. She was replaced by Yolande Bavan, and the group was billed as Lambert, Hendricks and Bavan for the three live albums they recorded, 1962–64.

Countless singers cite the work of LH&R as an influence, including Joni Mitchell, Van Morrison, Al Jarreau and Bobby McFerrin. The song "Yeh Yeh", for which Hendricks composed the lyrics, became a no.1 hit in 1965 for British R&B-jazz singer Georgie Fame, who continues to record and perform Lambert, Hendricks & Ross compositions to this day. In 1966 Hendricks recorded "Fire in the City" with the Warlocks, who shortly after changed their name to the Grateful Dead. Hendricks wrote lyrics for several Thelonious Monk songs, including "In Walked Bud", which he performed on Monk's 1968 album Underground.

For a performance at the 1960 Monterey Jazz Festival, he created and starred in a musical he called Evolution of the Blues Song (later shortened to Evolution of the Blues), which featured such acclaimed singers as Jimmy Witherspoon, Hannah Dean, and "Big" Miller, as well as saxophonists Ben Webster and Pony Poindexter. The ensemble played not only Hendricks's words and music but also Percy Mayfield's classic "Please Send Me Someone to Love", the driving D. Love gospel song "That's Enough", and the blues evergreen, "C.C. Rider". In 1961, Columbia Records released an LP of the production and Hendricks later presented the show at the On Broadway Theater in San Francisco, where it ran for five years, and at the Westwood Playhouse in Los Angeles, where it was produced by attorneys Burton Marks and Mark Green.

== Solo ==
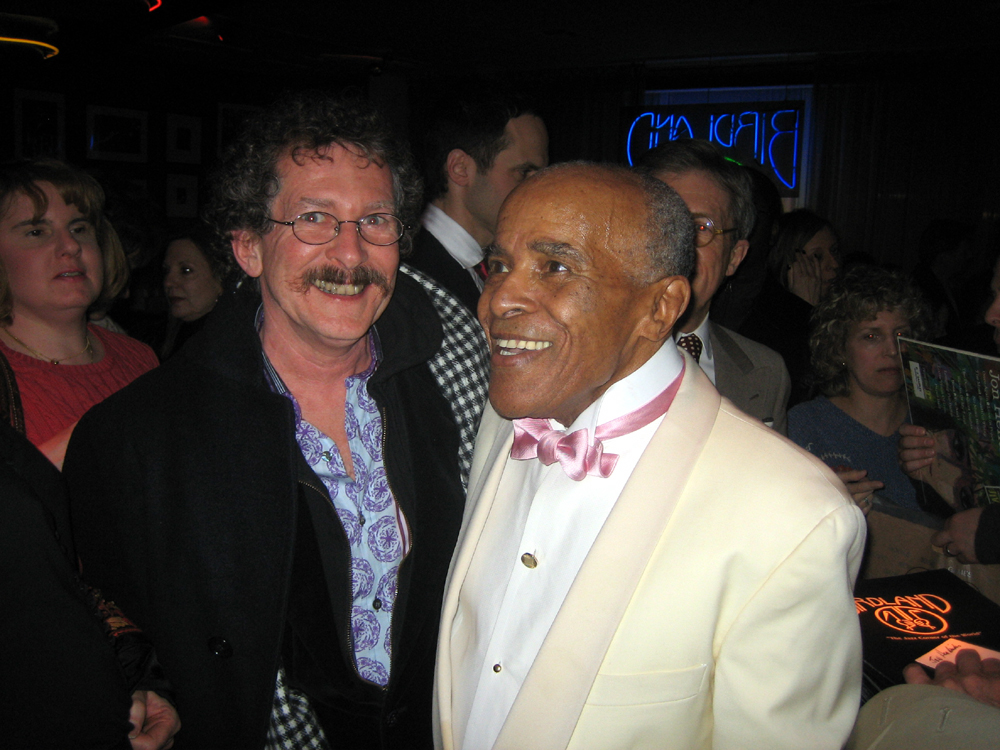
Jon Hendricks at Birdland

Hendricks recorded two albums in 1961 – Salud! João Gilberto (Reprise) and Fast Livin' Blues (Columbia). Having divorced Colleen and married Judith Dickstein, Hendricks moved to Mill Valley, California, reuniting with his children, who had been farmed out to relatives since the divorce. There he recorded Recorded in Person at the Trident (Smash). Later that year he was invited by Duke Ellington to take part in the latter's Concert of Sacred Music at San Francisco's Grace Cathedral. In 1968, he moved the family again, this time to London, England, partly so that his four children could receive a better education, and partly to distance them from the pervasive Californian drug culture. Using London as his base, he toured Europe and Africa, performed frequently on British radio and television with such stars of the day as Lulu and Dusty Springfield, as well as Ronnie Scott and the comedian Marty Feldman. His sold-out club dates at Ronnie Scott's drew fans such as the Rolling Stones and the Beatles. Hendricks also recorded two albums in London – Jon Hendricks Live (Fontana) and Times of Love (Philips), which was released in the US as September Songs (Stanyan, 1975). After five years, the Hendricks family returned to Mill Valley, where Hendricks worked as the jazz critic for the San Francisco Chronicle and taught classes at California State University at Sonoma and the University of California at Berkeley. In 1973 he recorded two songs with Art Blakey and the Jazz Messengers – Bobby Timmons's "Moanin'" and Benny Golson's "Along Came Betty" which appeared on Blakey's Buhaina album.

His album Tell Me the Truth (Arista, 1975) was produced by Ben Sidran. Love (Muse, 1982) by Jon Hendricks & Company came next, and featured his daughter Michele. He collaborated with old friends The Manhattan Transfer for their seminal 1985 album, Vocalese, which won seven Grammy Awards. After residing in London for a time, he returned to America in 1981. He served on the Kennedy Center Honors committee under presidents Carter, Reagan, and Clinton. His final studio album, the Grammy-nominated Freddie Freeloader, was released in 1990, and featured an all-star line-up that included George Benson, Al Jarreau, Bobby McFerrin, Tommy Flanagan, Jimmy Cobb, Larry Goldings, Wynton Marsalis, Stanley Turrentine, Al Grey, The Manhattan Transfer and the Count Basie Orchestra.

In 2000, Hendricks returned to his home town to teach at the University of Toledo, where he was appointed Distinguished Professor of Jazz Studies and received an honorary Doctorate of the Performing Arts. He was selected to be the first American jazz artist to lecture at the Sorbonne in Paris. His 15-voice group, the Jon Hendricks Vocalstra at the University of Toledo, performed at the Sorbonne in 2002. Hendricks also wrote lyrics to some classical pieces including "On the Trail" from Ferde Grofe's Grand Canyon Suite. The Vocalstra premiered a vocalese version of Rimsky-Korsakov's "Scheherazade" with the Toledo Symphony.

In the summer of 2003 Hendricks went on tour with the "Four Brothers", a quartet consisting of Hendricks, Kurt Elling, Mark Murphy and Kevin Mahogany. He worked on setting words to and arranging Rachmaninoff's second piano concerto as well as on two books, teaching and touring with his Vocalstra. He wrote lyrics to Gershwin's Piano Prelude No. 1 for the a cappella ensemble Pieces of 8's 2004 album Across the Blue Meridian. He appeared in cameo roles in the films People I Know (2002) and White Men Can't Jump (1992).

In 2012, Hendricks appeared in the documentary film No One But Me, discussing his former bandmate and friend, Annie Ross. In 2015, Hendricks lost his second wife Judith to a brain tumor.

Hendricks also appeared on three tracks from the 2016 release of the JC Hopkins Biggish Band titled "Meet Me at Minton's". He performs vocalese on "Suddenly (In Walked Bud)", is included in the ensemble on the album's title track "Meet Me at Minton's", and croons a duet of the Monk tune "How I Wish (Ask Me Now)" with singer and 2016 Thelonious Monk Competition winner Jazzmeia Horn. At the time of the recording he was 93 and Horn was 23.

In 2017, Hendricks's full lyricization of the album Miles Ahead, including Miles Davis' solos and Gil Evans' orchestrations, was completed fifty years after he had first conceived the idea. It was premiered in New York by UK-based choir the London Vocal Project, with Hendricks in attendance, with a studio recording to follow.

== Death ==
Hendricks died on November 22, 2017, in Manhattan, New York City, aged 96.

== Awards and honors ==
Hendricks was recognized with an NEA Jazz Master award in 1993, as well as receiving multiple Grammy Awards, and in 2004, he was honored in France with the Legion of Honour.

== Discography ==
=== As leader ===
- A Good Git-Together (World Pacific, 1959)
- Evolution of the Blues Song (Columbia, 1960)
- Live Recording at Birdland with Count Basie (Roulette, 1961)
- Fast Livin' Blues (Columbia, 1962)
- ¡Salud! João Gilberto, Originator of the Bossa Nova (Reprise, 1963)
- Recorded in Person at the Trident (Smash, 1965)
- Jon Hendricks Live (Fontana, 1970)
- Times of Love (Philips, 1972)
- Tell Me the Truth (Arista, 1975)
- Cloudburst (Enja, 1982)
- Love (Muse, 1982)
- Freddie Freeloader (Denon, 1990)
- Boppin' at the Blue Note (Telarc, 1995)

With Lambert, Hendricks and Ross

- Sing a Song of Basie (ABC-Paramount, 1958)
- Sing Along with Basie (Roulette, 1958)
- The Swingers! (World Pacific, 1959)
- The Hottest New Group in Jazz (Columbia, 1959)
- Sing Ellington (Columbia, 1960)
- High Flying (Columbia, 1961)
- The Real Ambassadors (Columbia Masterworks, 1962)
- Basie Live in Person (Natural Organic, 1979)
- Everybody's Boppin (Columbia, 1989)

With Lambert, Hendricks and Bavan

- At Newport '63 (RCA Victor, 1963)
- Recorded Live at Basin Street East (RCA Victor, 1963)
- Havin' a Ball at the Village Gate (RCA Victor, 1964)
- Swingin' Till the Girls Come Home (Bluebird, 1987)

=== As guest ===
- 3 Cohens, Family (Anzic, 2011)
- Karrin Allyson, Footprints (Concord Jazz, 2006)
- Art Blakey, Buhaina (Prestige, 1973)
- Terence Blanchard, People I Know (Decca, 2003)
- Dave Brubeck, Young Lions & Old Tigers (Telarc, 1995)
- Benny Carter, Benny Carter Songbook (Musicmasters, 1997)
- Benny Carter, Benny Carter Songbook Volume II (MusicMasters, 1997)
- Neil Diamond, In My Lifetime (Columbia, 1996)
- Kurt Elling, Live in Chicago (Blue Note, 1999)
- Georgie Fame, Cool Cat Blues (Go Jazz, 1991)
- Al Grey, Al Grey Fab (Capri, 1990)
- Joyce, Language and Love (Verve, 1991)
- King Pleasure, King Pleasure Sings (Prestige, 1954)
- The Manhattan Transfer, Mecca for Moderns (Atlantic, 1981)
- The Manhattan Transfer, Vocalese (Atlantic, 1985)
- Ellis Marsalis Jr., Ellis Marsalis Trio (Blue Note, 1991)
- Wynton Marsalis, Crescent City Christmas Card (Columbia, 1989)
- Wynton Marsalis, Blood on the Fields (Columbia, 1997)
- Bobby McFerrin, Spontaneous Inventions (Blue Note, 1986)
- Thelonious Monk, Underground (Columbia, 1968)
- Jimmy Rowles and Stan Getz, The Peacocks (Columbia, 1975)
- George Russell, New York, N.Y. (Decca, 1959)
- Janis Siegel, Experiment in White (Atlantic, 1982)
- Take 6, The Standard (Heads Up, 2008)
- Larry Vuckovich, Cast Your Fate (Palo Alto, 1984)
- Connie Evingson, All the Cats Join In (Minnehaha Music, 2014)
- Royal Bopsters – The Royal Bopsters Project (Motema, 2015)

== Filmography ==
- Music in Monk Time, a documentary tribute to Thelonious Monk, Hendricks served as co-writer, performer and narrator (1983, production by Songfilms International, Inc.)
- The Steve Allen Plymouth Show Episode #4.11 (1958): Lambert, Hendricks & Ross
- NET Playhouse Duke Ellington – A Concert of Sacred Music (1967): Jon Hendricks
- Jazz Is Our Religion (1972)
- White Men Can't Jump (1992): one of the Venice Beach Boys
- Foreign Student (1994): April's father
- Jon Hendricks, Tell Me The Truth, a documentary about the artist, directed by Audrey Lasbleiz (2008, production Mosaïque Films, Paris).
- Blues March: Soldier Jon Hendricks, a documentary about the artist fighting on two fronts in World War II by Malte Rauchof (2009, Strandfilm Productions)
