= Piano Interpretation =

Studio album by Al Haig
- Released: 1976
- Recorded: February 24 & 25 and June 21, 1976
- Studio: United/Western Studios, Hollywood, CA and Vanguard Studios, NYC
- Genre: Jazz
- Length: 36:17
- Label: Sea Breeze; SB-1001
- Producer: Toshiya Taenaka

Al Haig chronology
Duke 'n' Bird (1976)	Piano Interpretation (1976)	Piano Time (1976)

Interplay, is a solo album by jazz pianist Al Haig recorded in 1976 and released on the short-lived Sea Breeze label.

== Reception ==
Professional ratings
Review scores
Source	Rating
Allmusic	4/5 stars

The Allmusic review by Ron Wynn states, "A fine solo piano set from 1976, with Al Haig displaying the total technical package on standards and bop anthems. He plays some rapid-fire; others, he constructs slowly and carefully, then tears them down and rebuilds the theme with nicely executed, intricate solos".

== Track listing ==
1. "In Your Own Sweet Way" (Dave Brubeck) – 4:07
2. "Never Let Me Go" (Jay Livingston, Ray Evans) – 3:36
3. "Here's That Rainy Day" (Jimmy Van Heusen, Johnny Burke) – 4:38
4. "Don't You Know I Care" (Duke Ellington, Mack David) – 6:00
5. "Lament" (Ahmad Jamal) – 4:24
6. "Joanne" (Al Haig) – 4:27
7. "Summertime" (George Gershwin, DuBose Heyward) – 6:00
8. "Bess, You Is My Woman" (George Gershwin, Ira Gershwin) – 3:05

== Personnel ==
- Al Haig – piano
