= Piano Time =

Studio album by Al Haig
- Released: 1979
- Recorded: February 24 & 25 and June 21, 1976
- Studio: United/Western Studios, Hollywood, CA and Vanguard Studios, NYC
- Genre: Jazz
- Length: 36:17
- Label: Sea Breeze; SB-1006
- Producer: Toshiya Taenaka

Al Haig chronology
Piano Interpretation (1975)	Piano Time (1979)	Interplay (1976)

Piano Time, is a solo album by jazz pianist Al Haig recorded in 1976 and released on the short-lived Sea Breeze label in 1979.

== Reception ==
Professional ratings
Review scores
Source	Rating
Allmusic	3/5 stars

The Allmusic review by Ron Wynn states, "The second of two solo piano albums Al Haig made in 1976, both done with exacting precision as well as exuberant force. Haig was disproving the critics who said he was finished, and he showed convincingly that there was still plenty of power in his hands and lots of tricks up his sleeve".

== Track listing ==
1. "Bess, You Is My Woman" (George Gershwin, Ira Gershwin) – 3:24
2. "Summertime" (George Gershwin, DuBose Heyward) – 5:16
3. "Willow Weep for Me" (Ann Ronell) – 5:17
4. "I Should Care" (Axel Stordahl, Paul Weston, Sammy Cahn) – 3:25
5. "How Deep Is the Ocean?" (Irving Berlin) – 3:45
6. "I Can't Get Started (Vernon Duke, Ira Gershwin) – 5:04
7. "Nuages" (Django Reinhardt) – 4:25
8. "Violets for Your Furs" (Matt Dennis, Tom Adair) – 4:50
9. "Easy to Remember" (Richard Rodgers, Lorenz Hart) – 4:16

== Personnel ==
- Al Haig – piano
