= Basin Street East Proudly Presents Miss Peggy Lee =

Live album by Peggy Lee
- Released: 1961
- Recorded: February 9, March 8, 1961
- Genre: Vocal jazz
- Length: 33:14
- Label: Capitol
- Producer: Dave Cavanaugh

Peggy Lee chronology
Olé ala Lee (1960)	Basin Street East Proudly Presents Miss Peggy Lee (1961)	If You Go (1961)

Basin Street East Proudly Presents Miss Peggy Lee is a 1961 live album by Peggy Lee, arranged by Jack Marshall and Bill Holman, recorded at the Basin Street East nightclub in New York City.

== Reception ==
Professional ratings
Review scores
Source	Rating
AllMusic	2/5 stars

The AllMusic review by Scott Yanow awarded the album two stars and said:

Originally it was planned that the singer (at the height of her popularity) would record a live set at Basin Street East in New York. Unfortunately, she caught a cold and her voice was a bit hoarse, so some of the numbers were re-recorded in the studio the following month and spliced quite effectively into the set...and everything sounds pretty well planned in advance. Lee, who is best here on the ballads, never wanders at all from the melodies, and these renditions of her usual repertoire have nothing unique or unusual to offer except perhaps an overly rapid version of "Fever."

== Track listing ==
1. "Day In, Day Out" (Rube Bloom, Johnny Mercer) – 1:44
2. "Moments Like This" (Burton Lane, Frank Loesser) – 2:59
3. "Fever" (Eddie Cooley, John Davenport) – 2:54
4. "The Second Time Around" (Sammy Cahn, Jimmy Van Heusen) – 3:05
5. Medley: "One Kiss"/"My Romance"/"The Vagabond King Waltz" (Sigmund Romberg, Oscar Hammerstein II)/(Richard Rodgers, Lorenz Hart)/(Rudolf Friml, Brian Hooker) – 2:55
6. "I Got a Man" (Ray Charles) – 2:40
7. Applause – 0:22
8. "Call Me Darling (Call Me Sweetheart, Call Me Dear)" (Dorothy Dick, Mart Fryberg, Rolf Marbot, Bert Reisfeld) – 2:41
9. "I Love Being Here With You" (Peggy Lee, Bill Schluger) – 2:43
10. "But Beautiful" (Sonny Burke, Van Heusen) – 2:51
11. "Them There Eyes" (Maceo Pinkard, Doris Tauber, William Tracey) – 1:51
12. A Tribute to Ray Charles: "Just for a Thrill" (Louis Armstrong, Don Raye) – 3:18
13. A Tribute to Ray Charles: "Yes Indeed" (Sy Oliver) – 3:11
14. Applause – 1:23

== Personnel ==
- Peggy Lee – vocals
- Joe Harnell – conductor
- Danny Stiles – trumpet
- Phil Sunkel – trumpet
- Willie Thomas – trumpet
- Mickey Gravine – trombone
- Ray De Sio – trombone
- Bob Donovan – flute
- Abe Rosen – harp
- Max Bennett – bass
- Chino Pozo – congos & bongos
- Dennis Budimir – guitar
- Stan Levy – drums
