= Broadway, Bongos and Mr. B =

Studio album by Billy Eckstine
- Released: 1961
- Recorded: 1961
- Genre: Traditional pop, jazz
- Label: Mercury SR 60637

Billy Eckstine chronology
Once More with Feeling (1960)	Broadway, Bongos and Mr. B (1961)	At Basin Street East (1961)

Broadway, Bongos and Mr. B is a 1961 studio album by the American singer Billy Eckstine. It was arranged by Hal Mooney, and marked Eckstine's return to Roulette Records. The album features Latin tinged arrangements of popular Broadway show tunes, with a percussion section of xylophones, marimbas and bongos.

In their July 1961 review of Broadway, Bongos and Mr. B, Billboard magazine wrote that "This is one of the best albums made by Billy Eckstine in many years", and that he was "singing with confidence again in his own style". The review concluded that it was "A strong new album that could help win back many of Mr. B's fans".

This was the third of Eckstine's Mercury Records albums to use the same photograph of him. It had previously graced the covers of Billy's Best! (1958) and Billy Eckstine's Imagination (1958).

== Track listing ==
1. "From This Moment On" (Cole Porter) – 2:19
2. "I Could Write a Book" (Richard Rodgers, Lorenz Hart) – 2:02
3. "If Ever I Would Leave You" (Alan Jay Lerner, Frederick Loewe) – 2:45
4. "I've Got You Under My Skin" (Porter) – 2:52
5. "Oh, What a Beautiful Mornin'" (Rodgers, Oscar Hammerstein II) – 3:02
6. "Tonight" (Leonard Bernstein, Stephen Sondheim) – 2:42
7. "Stranger In Paradise" (Robert Wright, George Forrest, Alexander Borodin) – 2:20
8. "Get Out of Town" (Porter) – 2:12
9. "Old Devil Moon" (Burton Lane, E.Y. Harburg) – 2:53
10. "On the Street Where You Live" (Lerner, Loewe) – 2:41
11. "There's a Small Hotel" (Rodgers, Hart) – 2:40
12. "Something I Dreamed Last Night" (Sammy Fain, Herb Magidson, Jack Yellen) – 3:04

== Personnel ==
- Billy Eckstine – vocals
- Hal Mooney – arranger, conductor
