= Interplay (Al Haig album) =

Studio album by Al Haig
- Released: 1976
- Recorded: November 16, 1976
- Studio: United/Western Studios, Hollywood, CA
- Genre: Jazz
- Length: 43:53
- Label: Sea Breeze; SB-1005
- Producer: Toshiya Taenaka

Al Haig chronology
Piano Time (1976)	Interplay (1976)	Serendipity (1977)

Interplay, is an album by jazz pianist Al Haig and bassist Jamil Nasser recorded in 1976 and released on the short-lived Sea Breeze label.

== Reception ==
Professional ratings
Review scores
Source	Rating
Allmusic	3/5 stars

The Allmusic review by Ron Wynn states, "Fine duets featuring pianist Al Haig during a busy period in the mid-'70s. He'd overcome personal problems and was cranking out albums left and right ... They are mostly excellent examples of Haig's surging bop style".

== Track listing ==
1. "How Deep Is the Ocean?" (Irving Berlin) – 5:45
2. "Passion Flower" (Billy Strayhorn) – 5:26
3. "All the Things You Are" (Jerome Kern, Oscar Hammerstein II) – 6:18
4. "Warm Valley" (Duke Ellington) – 5:27
5. "Milestones" (Miles Davis) – 4:12
6. "Prelude to a Kiss" (Ellington, Irving Gordon, Irving Mills) – 5:17
7. "Love Walked In" (George Gershwin, Ira Gershwin) – 5:00
8. "Star Eyes" (Gene de Paul, Don Raye) – 6:28

== Personnel ==
- Al Haig – piano
- Jamil Nasser – bass
