= I Love Being Here with You =

1961 jazz pop song by Peggy Lee

"I Love Being Here With You"
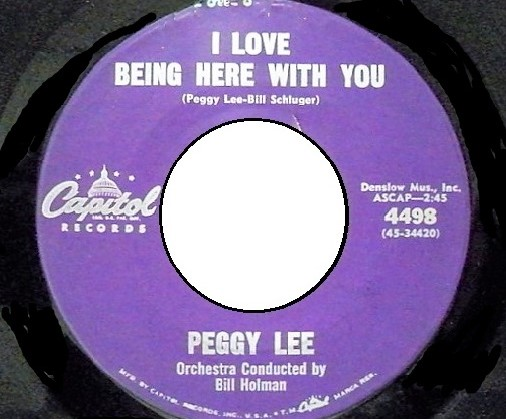

Single by Peggy Lee
- A-side: "Bucket of Tears"
- Released: 1961
- Studio: Capitol
- Genre: Swing, jazz
- Length: 2:45
- Label: Capitol Records
- Songwriter(s): Peggy Lee, Bill Schluger

"I Love Being Here with You" is a song written by Peggy Lee and Bill Schluger. It was released by Capitol Records in 1961 as the B-side to her single "Bucket of Tears", and then on the album Basin Street East Proudly Presents Miss Peggy Lee. Orchestration was arranged and conducted by Bill Holman. Though released as a B-side, it quickly became a popular song with other artists.

== Cover versions ==
"I Love Being Here with You" was the 44th most-covered song in the world in 1961. Notable artists who have recorded it include: Ella Fitzgerald, Buddy Greco, Ernestine Anderson, Bette Midler, Diana Krall and Queen Latifah. Peggy Lee and Judy Garland sang a personalized version of it as a duet on the December 1, 1963 episode of The Judy Garland Show.

== In popular culture ==
"I Love Being Here with You" became a central part of Peggy Lee's touring act, and many other performers acts as well.

The song was performed on The Ed Sullivan Show by Peggy Lee on October 6, 1960, and Ella Fitzgerald on February 2, 1964.

The television series Six Feet Under featured it in three episodes and included on the Six Feet Under Original TV Soundtrack.
