= ¡Salud! João Gilberto, Originator of the Bossa Nova =

Studio album by Jon Hendricks
- Released: 1963
- Genre: Vocal jazz
- Length: 62:43
- Label: Reprise

Jon Hendricks chronology
A Good Git-Together (1959)	¡Salud! João Gilberto, Originator of the Bossa Nova (1963)	Fast Livin' Blues (1962)

Professional ratings
Review scores
Source	Rating
Allmusic	4/5 stars
The Penguin Guide to Jazz Recordings	3/4 stars

¡Salud! João Gilberto, Originator of the Bossa Nova is an album by Jon Hendricks that was recorded as a tribute to João Gilberto.

== Track listing ==
No.	Title	Writer(s)	Length
1.	"The Duck (O Pato)"	Jon Hendricks, Jayme Silva, Neuza Teixeira	1:55
2.	"Quiet Nights of Quiet Stars (Corcovado)"	Antônio Carlos Jobim, Gene Lees	2:06
3.	"You and I (Voce E Eu)"	Carlos Lyra, Vinicius de Moraes	3:06
4.	"Love in Peace (O Amor Em Paz)"	de Moraes, Hendricks, Jobim	2:34
5.	"Little Paper Ball (Bolinha de Papel)"	Hendricks, Agustin Pereyra Lucena	1:16
6.	"Longing for Bahia"	Dorival Caymmi, Hendricks	2:26
7.	"Little Train of Iron (Trem de Ferro)"	Hendricks, Maia	1:55
8.	"No More Blues (Chega de Saudade)"	Jesse Cavanaugh, de Moraes, Hendricks, Jobim	2:06
9.	"Rosa Moreno"	Caymmi, Hendricks	2:11
10.	"The Most Beautiful Thing (Coisa Mais Linda)"	Moraes, Hendricks	3:06
11.	"Samba of My Land (Samba da Minha Terra)"	Caymmi, Hendricks	2:29
12.	"Once Again (Outra Vez)"	Hendricks, Jobim	1:57
13.	"Jive Samba"	Nat Adderley, Hendricks	2:18

== Personnel ==
- Jon Hendricks – vocals
- Conte Candoli – trumpet
- Pete Candoli – trumpet
- Milt Bernhart – trombone
- Buddy Collette – flute
- Gildo Mahones – piano
- Ray Sherman – organ
- Frank Messina – accordion
- Jimmie Smith – drums
