= Memories Ad-Lib =

Studio album by Joe Williams and Count Basie
- Released: 1959
- Recorded: October 16–18, 1958; New York City
- Genre: Jazz
- Length: 34:27
- Label: Roulette; SR 52021
- Producer: Teddy Reig

Count Basie chronology
Sing Along with Basie (1958)	Memories Ad-Lib (1959)	Basie One More Time (1959)

Joe Williams chronology
Sing Along with Basie (1958)	Memories Ad-Lib (1958)	Everyday I Have the Blues (1959)

Memories Ad-Lib is an album by singer Joe Williams with Count Basie. It features tracks recorded in 1958 and was originally released in 1959 on the Roulette label. It is notable for featuring several short solo passages by rhythm guitarist Freddie Green.

== Reception ==
Professional ratings
Review scores
Source	Rating
AllMusic	4/5 stars

AllMusic awarded the album 4 stars and its review by Ken Dryden states, "it will be greatly appreciated by fans of Count Basie and Joe Williams".

== Track listing ==
1. "Ain't Misbehavin'" (Harry Brooks, Andy Razaf, Fats Waller) – 3:27
2. "I'll Always Be in Love With You" (Bud Green, Herman Ruby, Sam H. Stept) – 2:45
3. "Sweet Sue, Just You" (Victor Young, Will J. Harris) – 2:20
4. "If I Could Be with You (One Hour Tonight)" (James P. Johnson, Henry Creamer) – 3:10
5. "Dinah" (Harry Akst, Sam M. Lewis, Joe Young) – 3:20
6. "Sometimes I'm Happy" (Vincent Youmans, Irving Caesar) – 2:49 Bonus track on CD reissue
7. "Baby Won't You Please Come Home" (Charles Warfield, Clarence Williams) – 2:22
8. "Call Me Darling (Call Me Sweetheart, Call Me Dear)" (Dorothy Dick, Mart Fryberg, Rolf Marbot, Bert Reisfeld) – 3:06
9. "The One I Love (Belongs to Somebody Else)" (Isham Jones, Gus Kahn) – 2:40
10. "Memories of You" (Eubie Blake, Razaf) – 3:22
11. "Honeysuckle Rose" (Waller, Razaf) – 2:26
12. "All of Me" (Gerald Marks, Seymour Simons) – 2:40 Bonus track on CD reissue

== Personnel ==
- Joe Williams – vocals
- Count Basie – organ
- Freddie Green – guitar
- George Duvivier – double bass
- Jimmy Crawford – drums
- Harry Edison – trumpet
