= Bernarda Alba (musical) =

- Music: Michael John LaChiusa
- Lyrics: Michael John LaChiusa
- Book: Michael John LaChiusa
- Basis: The House of Bernarda Alba by Federico García Lorca
- Productions: 2006 Off-Broadway; 2010 London; 2016 Ekaterinburg; 2018 Seoul; 2021 Seoul; 2023 Seoul

Bernarda Alba is a one-act musical with music, lyrics and book by Michael John LaChiusa, based on Federico García Lorca's 1936 play The House of Bernarda Alba. Bernarda Alba tells the story of a controlling, newly widowed mother who is challenged by her five rebellious daughters. The musical opened Off Broadway at Lincoln Center's Mitzi E. Newhouse Theater in 2006, to mixed reviews.

== Synopsis ==
ACT I

Set in 1936 in a "little town in Spain", Lives Bernarda Alba. Poncia, the head maid of the house, tells the audience the following. From her first husband she had a daughter, Angustias. After his death, she remarried to Antonio, a stable owner. With Antonia, she had 4 daughters- Magdalena, Amelia, Martirio, and Adela. Antonio is revealed to have been raping his stepdaughter, Angustias, as well as the family's young maid. Bernarda, instead of paying this mind, turns her attention to disciplining her other 4 daughters and making sure her senile mother, Maria Josefa, stays under strict watch to not be seen by the neighbors. Suddenly, Antonio dies (Prolouge). The town attends his funeral to gossip (The Funeral). The family returns home, where Bernarda informs them that while they're in mourning there will be no leaving the house nor wearing anything but black. She continues to take care of the post-mortem tasks when she lashes out at the young maid for singing a tune, before reflecting on her marriage with Antonio, and cursing him for making her his whore, then leaving her alone to pick up his mess. She ends the song by reprising the Maid's song, lusting for love, before reprimanding herself (On The Day That I Marry/ Bernarda's Prayer). Amelia hums a tune, overheard by Martirio who recognizes the song as what Pepe El Romano had sung when he came to call, revealing that he has intentions of courting Angustias, due to her dowry from her father being higher than that of her sisters. Amelia and Martirio make fun of his song and are joined by Magdalena and Adela, though they all secretly yearn for him themselves. Suddenly, Pepe appears, singing his song outside the house to Angustias (Love, Let Me Sing You). Angustias goes to see Pepe, just to be met with Bernarda, who disciplines her for powdering her face on the day of Antonio's funeral. Suddenly, Maria Josefa escapes, lamenting about how she longs to be free of Bernarda's house, go to the sea, and marry (Let Me Go to The Sea).

ACT II

Angustias, Magdalena, Amelia, Martirio and Poncia sew Trousseaus. Magdalena speaks of an old folk tale (Magdalena) before calling out to Adela, seeing if she is to come. Angustias internally wonders why she feels as though Pepe sings his song for someone besides her (Angustias). Poncia tells the sisters stories of when she was courted, embarrassing Amelia and leading her to recall a suggestive encounter with a boy by the river (Amelia). Poncia continues, telling the girls how immature men are. Martirio thinks of how she is mistreated by men and boys based upon her looks, despite her feeling she deserves love (Martirio). Finally, Adela joins. The sisters interrogate her, asking why she had slept so late and why she had mentioned her body was aching all over. She gets defensive, telling them she has the right to do with her body as she pleases and brushes them off. In her mind, she speaks of how she wants to know desire, and how she longs to wear her green dress and be openly with her love for the world to see (Adela). Privately, Poncia confronts Adela- revealing that she knows that Adela has been seeing Pepe secretly. She advises her not to for her own safety, and Adela fights back. Before Poncia can continue to warn her, the men from the mountains cross by the home and the sisters go to watch (I Will Dream Of What I Saw). Angustias finds that her photo of Pepe kept under her pillow has gone missing. Poncia finds it between the sheets of Martirio's bed, and Bernarda disciplines her, as she defends it as a joke. Adela mentions it is not a joke, and her and Martirio argue while the sisters yell how Pepe only wants Angustias for her dowry. Bernarda shuts them all down, sending them to their rooms. Poncia warns Bernarda that something serious is going on, but Bernarda brushes her off, accusing her of wanting the downfall of her family. Poncia laments about how she has done nothing but tend to Bernarda and her family for 30 years, but that she will sit idly by when Bernarda turns to her at the falling of her house (Poncia). Suddenly, a big crowd comes down the street. Poncia shares that a girl in town, Limbrada's Daughter, had a child out of wedlock with an unknown father, and in order to hide her shame killed the baby and buried it under some rocks. Dogs brought the corpse of the infant to her doorstep, and she is paraded through town as an example. Bernarda joins in, chanting that all women who lust in sin must die, striking fear in Adela (Limbrada's Daughter).

ACT III

Poncia, the maid, and the servant sing a folk song as Bernarda reflects on how her life has changed since the death of Antonia (One Moorish Girl/The Smallest Stream). The family meets their neighbor, Prudencia, for dinner. They discuss Angustias's recent engagement, while the stallion in the stable beats on the barn door. Bernarda shares that she plans on mating the stallion with the mare first thing in the morning. In order to get him to stop making noise, she instructs the servant to let the Stallion roll around in the yard outside of the stable. Bernarda asks Angustias when she will forgive Martirio about the incident with Pepe's picture, insisting it was a joke. Angustias shares her insecurity about Pepe, Bernarda tells her not to worry. Angustias tells her mother that Pepe will not be coming to call that night, as he is in town with his mother. Suddenly, the mare kicks her way out of the stable, and the sisters witness the Mare and the Stallion mating (The Stallion). Bernarda sends them all to bed. Poncia tells the maid of Adela's affair with Pepe. Adela walks around the house late at night, spending a moment with Maria Josefa (Lullaby) before letting her escape. Adela then goes to meet Pepe, and they have sex. Martirio bursts in and confronts Adela, and calls for Bernarda to expose her. The family shames Adela. Bernarda finds that Pepe is still in the yard, and goes to shoot him. When she comes back in, Martirio reports that he has died. Adela slips out into her room, when Bernarda reveals that she had missed and Pepe escaped. The family then realizes that Adela has left, and goes to bang on her door. When it finally opens, they see that she has hung herself. Bernarda tells her daughters to learn to look death in the face, and insists that Adela died a virgin (Finale).

== Productions ==
With direction and choreography by Graciela Daniele, the all-female cast starred Phylicia Rashad and Daphne Rubin-Vega. The production had a limited run from March 6 to April 9, 2006. The production received Lucille Lortel Awards and Outer Critics Circle Awards Best Musical and choreography (Daniele) nominations. The lighting designer (Stephen Strawbridge) received nominations from Lortel, Henry Hewes Design Awards, and Outer Critics Circle. Daniele also received a Callaway Award nomination for choreography. A cast recording was released by Ghostlight Records in July 2006.

The UK premiere opened at the Union Theatre in London on August 23, 2011, produced by Triptic. The production was directed by Katherine Hare with musical direction by Leigh Thompson and choreography by Racky Plews. This production received a positive response from UK based critics. "SIMPLY ELECTRIC... a rather unique but unmissable piece of theatre." ThePublicReviews.com

== Casts ==
Original 2006 New York cast

- Phylicia Rashad – Bernarda Alba
- Saundra Santiago – Angustias
- Judith Blazer – Magdalena
- Sally Murphy – Amelia
- Daphne Rubin-Vega – Martirio
- Nikki M. James – Adela
- Yolande Bavan – Maria Josepha
- Candy Buckley – Poncia
- Nancy Ticotin – Servant/Prudencia
- Laura Shoop – Young Maid

Original 2011 London cast

- Beverley Klein – Bernarda Alba
- Sophie Jugé – Angustias
- Soophia Foroughi – Magdalena
- Emily-Jane Morris – Amelia
- Rebecca Trehearn – Martirio
- Amelia Adams-Pearce – Adela
- Buster Skeggs – Maria Josepha
- Ellen O’grady – Poncia
- Suanne Braun – Servant/Prudencia
- Maria Coyne – Young Maid

== Musical numbers ==
- Prologue – Poncia, Women
- The Funeral – Bernarda, Women
- On the Day That I Marry – Young Maid, Bernarda, Poncia, Servant
- Bernarda's Prayer – Bernarda
- Love, Let Me Sing You – Amelia, Martirio, Magdalena, Adela, Servant
- Let Me Go To the Sea – Maria Josepha, Women
- Magdalena – Magdalena
- Angustias – Angustias, Women
- Amelia – Amelia, Young Maid, Servant
- Martirio – Martirio
- Adela – Adela, Daughters
- I Will Dream of What I Saw – Women
- Poncia – Poncia
- Limbrada's Daughter – Bernarda, Women
- One Moorish Girl – Young Maid, Servant, Poncia
- The Smallest Stream – Bernarda
- The Mare and the Stallion – Daughters
- Lullaby – Maria Josepha
- Open the Door – Adela, Women
- Finale – Bernarda

== Analysis ==
The characters sing the story as in an opera. One motif, of "barrenness and unappeasable longing" is seen in the production's design. For example, armless wooden chairs are lined against the back white stone wall, with its large door shut against the world. "When Bernarda draws the bolt, a sense of airlessness immediately descends over the daughters, illogical as this seems."

"LaChiusa and Daniele are determined to illustrate passion as vividly as possible in what is being called a musical but could just as easily be described as a dance piece with singing, an oratorio, or performance art. It's a beautifully seamless fusion of all these influences."

== Response ==
Ben Brantley, reviewing for The New York Times, wrote, "This latest offering from the prolific Mr. LaChiusa, often feels wan and weary...The music, though superbly orchestrated (by Michael Starobin) and played, goes places that singers used to hard-sell Broadway pizazz cannot follow. The punctuating yelps; the wavering sustained notes in minor keys; the labyrinthine interior musical paths; the eruptions into antimelodic harshness — these are all more the stuff of mid-20th-century chamber operas than conventional show tunes...The touchingly game performers, who include musical pros like Daphne Rubin-Vega (a haunting presence as the ugly daughter) and Yolande Bavan (as Bernarda's senile mother), inevitably stumble over such challenges."

The Curtain Up reviewer noted, "Graciela Daniele's direction and choreography bring out the vivid flamenco rhythm that flavors the score. The daughters' solo arias beautifully express their individual personalities. Despite it requiring a stretch to accept the pretty Daphne Rubin-Vega as the family ugly duckling, her voice and poignant acting stand out...audiences are likely to be split between those who will love its art-y gloominess and those (this critic among them) for whom it's less exhilarating than such LaChiusa works as See What I Want to See..."
