= Connie Evingson =

American singer

- Born: Hibbing, Minnesota, U.S
- Genres: Jazz, pop
- Occupation: Singer
- Instrument: Vocals
- Years active: 1980–present
- Label: Minnehaha Music
- Website: connieevingson.com

Connie Evingson is an American singer who performs jazz and pop music.

== Career ==
Evingson was born in Hibbing, Minnesota. With parents who were music fans, she grew up listening to Duke Ellington, Count Basie, Ella Fitzgerald, Sarah Vaughan, Tony Bennett, and Lambert, Hendricks & Ross. From a young age, she sang in church and school choirs and musical theater productions. After graduating from the University of Minnesota in 1981, she worked as a professional singer in clubs and concert halls in Minnesota and in 1986 became a member of the vocal jazz group Moore by Four. As a solo artist, she has appeared with the Toronto Symphony Orchestra and the Minnesota Orchestra as conducted by Doc Severinsen, at Jazz at Lincoln Center with Wynton Marsalis and Vince Giordano and the Nighthawks. and with the JazzMN Orchestra, among others.

== Discography ==
- I Have Dreamed (Minnehaha Music, 1995)
- Some Cats Know (Minnehaha Music, 1999)
- Fever: A Tribute to Peggy Lee (Minnehaha Music, 1999)
- The Secret of Christmas (Minnehaha Music, 2002)
- Let It Be Jazz: Connie Evingson Sings the Beatles (Minnehaha Music, 2003)
- Gypsy in My Soul (Minnehaha Music, 2004)
- Stockholm Sweetnin' (Minnehaha Music, 2006)
- Little Did I Dream: Songs by Dave Frishberg with Dave Frishberg (Minnehaha Music, 2008)
- Sweet Happy Life (Minnehaha Music, 2009)
- All the Cats Join In with John Jorgensen Quintet (Minnehaha Music, 2014)
