= Cold Turkey (album) =

Live album by Ray Bryant
- Released: 1964
- Recorded: 1964
- Venues: Basin Street East, New York City, New York
- Genre: Jazz
- Length: 34:40
- Labels: Sue; LP/STLP-1032
- Producer: Juggy Murray

Ray Bryant chronology
Live at Basin Street East (1964)	Cold Turkey (1964)	Soul (1965)

Cold Turkey is a live album by pianist Ray Bryant recorded at Basin Street East and released by Sue Records in 1964.

== Reception ==
Professional ratings
Review scores
Source	Rating
AllMusic	3/5 stars
The Penguin Guide to Jazz Recordings	3/4 stars

The AllMusic review stated: "This 1964 release finds versatile pianist Ray Bryant in a crowd-pleasing frame of mind. The 12 tracks provide solid grooves, lyrical ballads, blues, calypso, a bit of boogie-woogie, and more. Supported by a lively, yet unremarkable, rhythm section, the accessible melodies, riffs, and rhythms stream effortlessly from Bryant's fingers. Though he works well within the structure of each piece, the pianist's impressive technique, facility, and encyclopedic musicianship are constant, as is the sense that Bryant is content to make enjoyable music that makes no demands on the audience ... Bryant's skill remains beyond reproach. Cold Turkey may not be a great jazz date, but it's solid entertainment. Bryant is apparently quite content with that."

== Track listing ==
All compositions by Ray Bryant except where noted

1. "Cold Turkey" – 2:40
2. "Shake a Lady" – 2:47
3. "Favela" (Antônio Carlos Jobim, Vinícius de Moraes, Ray Gilbert) – 2:41
4. "Chicago Serenade" (Eddie Harris) – 2:18
5. "Congolese Children" (Randy Weston) – 2:43
6. "Blues March" (Benny Golson) – 2:32
7. "O Morro" (Jobim, de Moraes) – 3:50
8. "Mandecee" (Daniel Ray) – 2:25
9. "Sometime Ago" (Sergio Mihanovich) – 3:15
10. "Slip-Up" – 2:45
11. "Hello, Dolly!" (Jerry Herman) – 3:30
12. "I Wish You Love" (Charles Trénet, Albert Beach) – 3:14

== Personnel ==
- Ray Bryant – piano
- Jimmy Rowser – bass
- Ben Riley – drums
