= Music in Monk Time =

- Directed by: John Goodhue
- Screenplay by: Jon Hendricks and Stephen Rice
- Based on: the life and music of Thelonious Monk
- Produced by: Paul Matthews and Stephen Rice
- Starring: Thelonious Monk; Hendricks & Company; Carmen McRae; Dizzy Gillespie; Milt Jackson; Charlie Rouse; Larry Gales; Ben Riley; Walter Davis, Jr.; Paul Jeffrey; Terence Blanchard; John Heard; T.S. Monk
- Edited by: Robert Burden
- Music by: Thelonious Monk
- Production companies: Songfilms International, Inc.
- Distributed by: Devillier-Donegan Enterprises
- Release date: May 13, 1983
- Running time: 60 minutes
- Country: United States
- Language: English

Music in Monk Time is a 1983 American documentary film about improvisational jazz pianist Thelonious Monk and his music. Its full name is Music in Monk Time: A Retrospective Tribute to Thelonious Sphere Monk. Although the film did not receive widespread distribution, it was praised by many film and music critics.

== Production and content ==
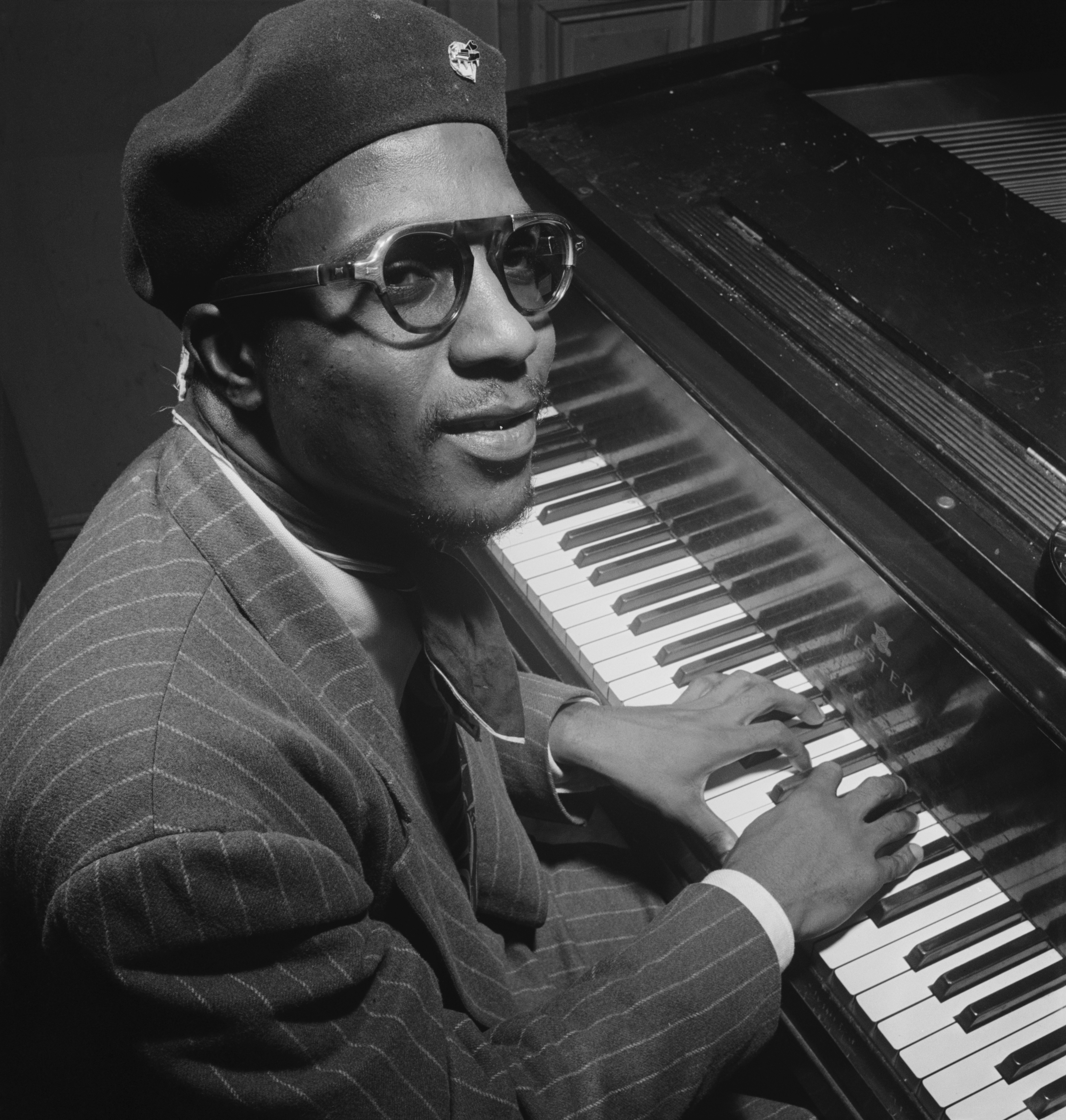
Thelonious Monk in 1947. Photo by William P. Gottlieb.

Planning for the film began within weeks of Monk's death in 1982. The production company, Songfilms, had a history producing successful music videos, and the firm was a partnership between Paul Matthews and Stephen Rice. The Los Angeles Herald Examiner reported that "Much hard work and detectivelike stealth went into the making of" the film. Many calls across the Atlantic resulted in the NRK, the Norwegian government broadcasting company, releasing black and white film of Monk performing there in 1965. The producers were also able to obtain film of a 1970 performance, also in black and white, of Monk playing solo in a TV studio in Paris. The Paris performance "shows us Monk's face dripping with sweat and his fingers percussively poking and stabbing the keys as he creates his unique world of sound."

Jon Hendricks agreed to narrate the film in "a bubbly, streetwise manner" and also sang "In Walked Bud", repeating his contribution to Monk's Underground album. Monk had called Hendricks "the only one I want to lyricize my music," and Hendricks was the only vocalist ever to record with Monk.

The producers were able to obtain many still photos of Monk, which were difficult to obtain since many photos had been lost in fires at Monk's apartments. These photos serve to "paint a picture of the man and his milieu", according to one critic. Musicians who respected Monk and worked with him performed for the film, including solos by Dizzy Gillespie and Milt Jackson, with Carmen McRae singing Hendricks' lyrics to Monk's classic "'Round Midnight".

== Notable showings ==
Music in Monk Time had its world premiere at the Reseda Country Club in May, 1983. Chick Corea opened for the film, with a band that included Chuck Mangione and drummer John Dentz. The trio played Monk compositions for an hour, and then the film was shown. The film was also shown at the Video Gallery in San Francisco in March, 1985. The film's narrator, Jon Hendricks, appeared in person to discuss the film and Monk and his music. The film was a featured presentation at the National Educational Film and Video Festival in Oakland, California in May, 1990. The film was distributed in Europe and Japan but was never widely shown in the United States. In June, 2021, the film was broadcast online as part of the San Francisco Jazz Festival. SFJAZZ originally premiered the film in 1985. Music in Monk Time became available for viewing on Quincy Jones' streaming platform, Qwest TV in 2023.

== Critical reception ==
Writing in the Los Angeles Times, jazz critic Leonard Feather called the documentary "surely the best jazz film in at least 25 years" and "an affectionate tribute, exquisitely expressed in words and music." A review in the Los Angeles Daily News said that the film "stands today as one of the greatest jazz films ever made", a "masterful piece of work", and "the model for future jazz film endeavors." In the Peninsula Times Tribune, a reviewer wrote, "The film's most outstanding attribute is its commitment to let Monk's own music stand as a kind of musical biography." The same reviewer later wrote that the film's "aggregate effect makes it one of the most honest and moving films about jazz in several decades. Above all, the film presents a complete impression of Monk - as a musician and as a human being." Writing in the San Francisco Chronicle, a reviewer said that the film is a "superbly crafted documentary that tells the story of his art by deftly mixing footage of Monk performances with interviews with musicians and family, still photographs, live performances of Monk's music by musicians who'd worked with him, and Jon Hendrick's pithy, lyrical narration." A jazz reviewer for the San Francisco Examiner called the film "a warm, loving memorial."

== Awards ==
In 1984, the film won a bronze medal at the New York Film Festival. In 1985, the film was a finalist in the Best Performance Film category at the Rose d'Or festival in Montreux.
