= Live at Basin Street East =

Live album by Ray Bryant
- Released: 1964
- Recorded: 1964
- Venue: Basin Street East, New York City
- Genre: Jazz
- Length: 37:19
- Label: Sue; LP /STLP 1019
- Producer: Juggy Murray

Ray Bryant chronology
Groove House (1963)	Live at Basin Street East (1964)	Cold Turkey (1964)

Live at Basin Street East is a live album by pianist Ray Bryant recorded at Basin Street East and released on Sue Records in 1964.

== Reception ==
Professional ratings
Review scores
Source	Rating
Allmusic	3/5 stars
The Penguin Guide to Jazz Recordings	3.5/4 stars

The Allmusic review stated "This LP concentrates primarily on standards, although one pop song of the period (Bob Dylan's "Blowin' in the Wind") is thrown in, along with a pair of Bryant's originals. The piano is in decent shape, though Bryant is fairly conservative in his approach to most of the tunes, resulting in a somewhat uninspired treatment of "C Jam Blues" and a funky but lackluster "Love for Sale." ... The audience, for the most part, seems more interested in talking among themselves than realizing they are witnessing the making of a live recording".

== Track listing ==
All compositions by Ray Bryant except where noted

1. "What Is This Thing Called Love?" (Cole Porter) – 3:40
2. "C Jam Blues" (Barney Bigard, Duke Ellington) – 3:30
3. "Sister Suzie" – 4:36
4. "This Is All I Ask" (Gordon Jenkins) – 2:28
5. "Love for Sale" (Porter) – 4:26
6. "Blowin' in the Wind" (Bob Dylan) – 4:15
7. "Satin Doll" (Ellington, Billy Strayhorn, Johnny Mercer) – 4:40
8. "Days of Wine and Roses" )Henry Mancini, Johnny Mercer) – 4:07
9. "Blue Azurte" (Wild Bill Davis) – 2:20
10. "All the Young Ladies" – 3:17

== Personnel ==
- Ray Bryant – piano
- Jimmy Rowser – bass
- Ben Riley – drums
