= Jane Monheit =

American jazz and pop singer

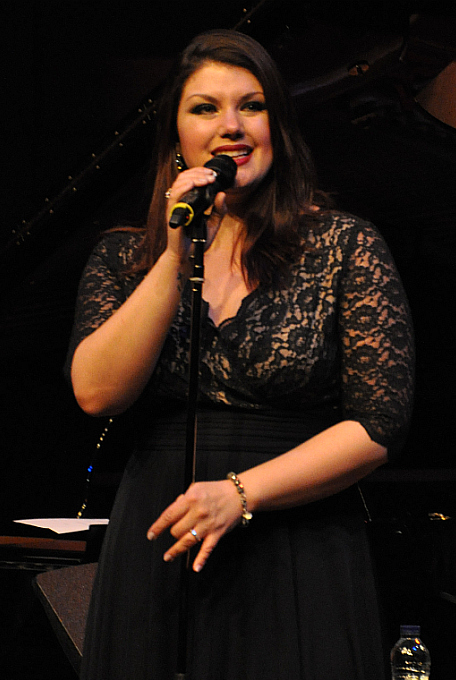
- Monheit performing at Koerner Hall in Toronto, April 2013

Background information
- Born: November 3, 1977 (age 49); Oakdale, New York, U.S.
- Genres: Vocal jazz; pop standards; Brazilian
- Occupation: Singer
- Years active: 2000–present
- Labels: N-Coded; Epic; Concord; EmArcy; Emerald City; Club44
- Website: www.janemonheitonline.com

Jane Monheit (born November 3, 1977) is an American jazz and traditional pop singer.

== Early life ==
Monheit was born and raised in Oakdale, New York, on Long Island. Her father played banjo and guitar. Her mother sang and played music for her by singers who could also be her teachers, beginning with Ella Fitzgerald. At an early age, Monheit was drawn to jazz and Broadway musicals.

She began singing professionally while attending Connetquot High School in Bohemia, New York. She attended the Usdan Summer Camp for the Arts. At the Manhattan School of Music she studied voice under Peter Eldridge; she graduated in 1999.

She was runner-up to Teri Thornton in the 1998 vocal competition at the Thelonious Monk Institute of Jazz, in Washington, DC.

== Career ==
When she was 22, she released her first album, Never Never Land (N-Coded, 2000). Like Fitzgerald, she recorded many songs from the Great American Songbook. After recording for five labels, she started her own, Emerald City Records. Its first release was The Songbook Sessions (2016), an homage to Fitzgerald.

Monheit's vocals were featured in the 2010 film Never Let Me Go for the titular song, written by Luther Dixon, and credited to the fictional Judy Bridgewater. (On her debut album, she had performed a different song by the same name, written by Livingston and Evans.)

== Discography ==
=== Studio albums ===
List of studio albums, with selected chart positions
Title	Details	Peak chart positions							
Title	Details	US	US Top Sales	US Jazz	US Trad. Jazz	US Top Cur	US Indie	US Holiday	POR
Never Never Land	Released: 2000; Label: N-Coded	—	—	3	2	—	28	—	—
Come Dream with Me	Released: 2001; Label: N-Coded	153	153	1	1	153	5	—	—
In the Sun	Released: 2002; Label: N-Coded	173	173	5	2	173	10	—	—
Taking a Chance on Love	Released: 2004; Label: Sony	94	94	2	1	94	—	—	13
The Season	Released: 2005; Label: Epic	—	—	11	8	—	—	12	—
Surrender	Released: 2007; Label: Concord	—	—	3	1	—	—	—	—
The Lovers, the Dreamers and Me	Released: 2008; Label: Concord	—	—	3	3	—	—	—	—
Home	Released: 2010; Label: EmArcy	—	—	5	2	—	—	—	—
The Heart of the Matter	Released: 2013; Label: EmArcy	—	—	5	4	—	—	—	—
2 in Love (David Benoit featuring Jane Monheit)	Released: 2015; Label: Concord	—	—	6	5	—	—	—	—
Believe (The David Benoit Trio featuring Jane Monheit and the All-American Boys Chorus)	Released: 2015; Label: Concord	—	—	23	15	—	—	—	—
The Songbook Sessions: Ella Fitzgerald	Released: 2016; Label: Emerald City	—	—	6	4	—	—	—	—
Come What May	Released 2021; Label: Club44	—	—	—	—	—	—	—	—
The Merriest	Released 2022; Label: Club44	—	—	—	—	—	—	—	—
Jane Monheit	Released 2024; Label: Club44	—	—	—	—	—	—	—	—
"—" denotes a recording that did not chart or was not released in that territory.

=== Live albums ===
List of live albums, with selected chart positions
Title	Details	Peak chart positions	
Title	Details	US Jazz	US Trad. Jazz
Live at the Rainbow Room	Released: 2003; Label: N-Coded	40	18

=== Singles ===
List of charted singles, with selected chart positions
Year	Title	Peak chart positions	Album
Year	Title	Smooth Jazz Airplay	Album
2015	"Too in Love" (David Benoit featuring Jane Monheit)	7	2 in Love

=== Guest appearances ===
List of guest appearances, with other performing artists, showing year released and album name
Title	Year	Other artist(s)	Album
"I Can't Give You Anything but Love"	2001	Terence Blanchard	Let's Get Lost
"Secret Love"	2001	Les Brown & His Band of Renown	Session #55 (1936–2001)
"Sentimental Journey"	2001	Les Brown & His Band of Renown	Session #55 (1936–2001)
"Snow"	2003	Tom Harrell	Wise Children
"Honeysuckle Rose"	2003	Mark O'Connor	In Full Swing
"Misty"	2003	Mark O'Connor	In Full Swing
"Fascinating Rhythm"	2003	Mark O'Connor	In Full Swing
"Manhattan"	2005	Frank Vignola and Joe Ascione	66 2/3
"I'll Take Romance"	2015	Harold Mabern	Afro Blue
"My One and Only Love"	2015	Harold Mabern	Afro Blue
