= At Basin Street East (Billy Eckstine and Quincy Jones album) =

Live album by Billy Eckstine
- Released: October 1, 1961
- Recorded: 1961
- Genre: Jazz; traditional pop
- Label: EmArcy

Billy Eckstine chronology
Broadway, Bongos and Mr. B (1960)	At Basin Street East (1961)	Don't Worry 'Bout Me (1961)

At Basin Street East is a 1961 live album by Billy Eckstine, accompanied by a big band arranged and conducted by Quincy Jones. It was originally released on October 1, 1961, on the EmArcy label, and reissued in 1990 by Polygram. The album was recorded at the Basin Street East nightclub in New York City.

== Critical reception ==
Professional ratings
Review scores
Source	Rating
AllMusic	3.5/5 stars
New Record Mirror	4/5 stars

Jimmy Watson of New Record Mirror in a 4/5 star review exclaimed, "A NEW and most exciting set from my all-time buddy Mr. 'B', Billy Eckstine. He is strongly supported by Quincy Jones and his big swinging band. As always the choice of material is excellent."

Ron Wynn of AllMusic in a 3.5/5 star review called the album "a fine live date with Quincy Jones leading the orchestra and writing the tracks."

== Track listing ==
1. "Alright, Okay, You Win" (Sidney Wyche, Mayme Watts)
2. Medley: "I'm Falling for You"/"Fool That I Am"/"Everything I Have Is Yours" (Burton Lane, George Sanders, Jr., Clarence Williams, Floyd Hunt, Harold Adamson)
3. "In the Still of the Night" (Cole Porter)
4. Duke Ellington medley: "Don't Get Around Much Anymore"/"I'm Just a Lucky So-and-So" (Irving Mills, Duke Ellington, Mitchell Parish, Bob Russell, Juan Tizol, Mack David)
5. "Work Song" (Nat Adderley, Oscar Brown, Jr.)
6. "Ma (She's Making Eyes at Me)" (Con Conrad, Sidney Clare)

== Personnel ==
- Billy Eckstine – vocals
- Quincy Jones – bandleader
