= Ray Abrams (musician) =

American jazz musician

Ray Abrams (January 23, 1920 – July 1992) was an American jazz and jump blues tenor saxophonist, born Ray Abramson in New York City. His younger brother was jazz drummer Lee Abrams. Ray Abrams first worked with Dizzy Gillespie in 1945, toured Europe with Don Redman in 1946 and was with Andy Kirk in 1947. He went back and forth between Kirk and Gillespie for decades. Outside of his work with Gillespie he might be best known for the "Ray Abrams Big Band." Other bands with which he played into the early 1950s include those of Hot Lips Page, Roy Eldridge, and Slim Gaillard.

== Discography ==
=== As sideman ===
- Dizzy Gillespie, Odyssey 1945–1952 (Savoy, 2002)
- Dizzy Gillespie, Showtime at the Spotlite, 52nd Street New York City, June 1946 (Uptown, 2008)
- Coleman Hawkins, Rainbow Mist (Delmark, 1992)
- King Pleasure, The Source (Prestige, 1972)
- Jimmy Scott & Paul Gayten, Regal Records: Live in New Orleans (Speciality, 1991)
