= Prezervation =

Compilation album by Stan Getz, Al Haig
- Released: End of January 1968
- Recorded: June 21 and July 28, 1949 – January 6 and February 27, 1950; New York City
- Genre: Jazz
- Length: 35:53
- Label: Prestige; PRLP 7516
- Producer: Bob Weinstock (#1, 6–12); Harry Lim (#2–5)

Professional ratings
Review scores
Source	Rating
The Penguin Guide to Jazz Recordings	3/4 stars

Prezervation is a compilation album by saxophone player Stan Getz and pianist Al Haig. It was released in January 1968 and includes performances recorded between 1949 and 1950. The album features both instrumental and vocal pieces. Whilst the first eight pieces had been available on LP before, tracks 9–12 were unissued at the time of the album's release and don't feature Getz playing. Prezervation also includes the rarities "Stardust" and "Goodnight My Love", whose masters had been thought lost until being rediscovered by Don Schlitten shortly before the album's release.

== Track listing ==
1. "Prezervation" (Getz) - 2:43
2. "Pinch Bottle" (Haig) - 3:01
3. "Earless Engineering" (Haig) - 2:54
4. "Be Still, TV" (Jimmy Raney) - 3:09
5. "Short P, Not LP" (Raney) - 3:19
6. "Stardust" (Hoagy Carmichael) - 2:41
7. "Goodnight My Love" (Mack Gordon, Harry Revel) - 2:40
8. "Intoit" (Getz) - 3:22
9. "Liza" (George Gershwin, Ira Gershwin, Gus Kahn) - 2:36
10. "Stars Fell on Alabama" (Frank Perkins, Mitchell Parish) - 3:34
11. "Stairway to the Stars" (Mitchell Parish, Matty Malneck, Frank Signorelli) - 3:31
12. "Opus Caprice" (Haig) - 2:19

Track 1 recorded on June 21, 1949; tracks 2–5 on July 28, 1949; 6–8 on January 6, 1950; 9–12 on February 27, 1950

== Personnel ==
- Stan Getz - tenor saxophone (all tracks except 9–12)
- Al Haig - piano
- Tommy Potter - bass
- Roy Haynes - drums
- Kai Winding - trombone (2–5)
- Jimmy Raney - vocals (4–5), guitar
- Gene Ramey - bass (1)
- Stan Levey - drums (1)
- Blossom Dearie - vocals (4–5)
- Junior Parker - vocals (6–7)
