= No One but Me =

2012 documentary film

No One But Me
- Directed by: Brian Ross
- Produced by: Gill Parry
- Starring: Annie Ross; Jon Hendricks; Dave Usher; Peter King; Tardo Hammer; James Wormworth; Tony Kinsey; Warren Vache
- Edited by: Kant Pan
- Production companies: CONNECTfilm; BBC Scotland; Creative Scotland
- Release date: 21 February 2012 (Glasgow Film Festival)
- Running time: 75 minutes
- Country: United Kingdom
- Language: English

No One But Me is a 2012 documentary film about Scottish jazz musician Annie Ross, directed by Brian Ross and produced by Gill Parry. Filmed over three years, the film focuses upon Ross' musical career, struggles with heroin addiction, and her relationships with both her family and contemporaries Billie Holiday and Lenny Bruce. Regarding the film, Ross noted, "It's very blunt, it's very truthful. [...] It makes me a bit nervous, but one thing about the film – it’s honest."

The film features contributions from musicians Jon Hendricks, Peter King, James Wormworth, Tony Kinsey and Warren Vache.

== Release ==
The film debuted at the 2012 Glasgow Film Festival to a sell-out performance, with Ross attending its premier and participating in a Q&A session and concert following its screening.

== Reception ==
The film was received positively upon its debut. The Herald stated, "This BBC Scotland/Creative Scotland-backed documentary is much more than a TV talking heads effort," and praised its "cinematic style that uses beautifully photographed cutaway shots to atmospherically evoke locations as diverse as the car-choked streets of New York and the free-flowing burns of Fintry."
