= Leon Abramson =

American jazz drummer (1925–1992)

- Also known as: Lee Abrams
- Born: January 6, 1925; New York City, New York, U.S.
- Died: April 20, 1992 (aged 67); New York City, New York, U.S.
- Genres: Jazz
- Occupation: Drummer
- Instruments: Drums

Leon Abramson, known as Lee Abrams (January 6, 1925 – April 20, 1992) was an American jazz drummer. He died in 1992 at the age of 67.

== Early life ==
Abrams was born in New York City and was raised in Brooklyn. His father played the violin and clarinet. His brother, Ray Abrams, was a jazz saxophonist.

== Career ==
Abramson joined the United States Army in 1943 and was discharged in 1946. During his career, Abramson played with Roy Eldridge. On 52nd Street, he played with Coleman Hawkins, Eddie Lockjaw Davis and Jay Jay Johnson.
