= Yolande Bavan =

Sri Lankan singer and actress (born 1942)

- Born: June 1, 1942 (age 84); Sri Lanka
- Genres: Jazz
- Occupations: Singer and actress
- Years active: 1960s–1970s

Yolande Bavan (born June 1, 1942) is a Sri Lankan singer and actress.

== Career ==
Bavan toured Australia and Asia as a performer with Graeme Bell's band early in her career. She is best known for replacing Annie Ross in the jazz vocal group Lambert, Hendricks & Ross after Ross was forced to leave the group in 1962 due to poor health. Bavan recorded three albums, all live recordings, with the group under the name of Lambert, Hendricks & Bavan. In 1964, she and Dave Lambert left the group, effectively ending the trio. She appeared on To Tell the Truth in 1962 and in a rare feat, the singing group appeared and sang "This Could Be the Start of Something".

In 1969, Bavan and Peter Ivers made an album for Epic Records called Knight of the Blue Communion. Bavan provided vocals for Weather Report's 1972 album I Sing the Body Electric.

She has made several recorded appearances in musicals, including Salvation (1969), Snow White and the Seven Dwarfs (1969), and Michael John LaChiusa's Bernarda Alba (2006). She appeared in the films Parting Glances (1986), One True Thing (1998), and Cosmopolitan (2003), and in plays.
