= Lambert, Hendricks & Ross =

American vocalese trio

- Origin: New York City, US
- Genres: Jazz, vocalese, vocal jazz
- Years active: 1957–1964
- Labels: ABC-Paramount, Roulette, Columbia
- Past members: Dave Lambert; Jon Hendricks; Annie Ross; Yolande Bavan; Carol Sloane; Anne Marie Moss

Lambert, Hendricks & Ross were an American vocalese trio formed by jazz vocalists Dave Lambert, Jon Hendricks and Annie Ross. From 1962 to 1964, Ross was replaced by vocalist Yolande Bavan.

== History ==
The group formed in 1957 and recorded their first album Sing a Song of Basie (1958) for ABC-Paramount Records. The album featured versions of Count Basie standards and was successful enough that the Count Basie Orchestra collaborated with them on Sing Along with Basie (1959). Sing a Song of Basie was awarded a Grammy Hall of Fame Award in 1998.

Beginning in 1959, the trio recorded three LPs with Columbia Records. They recorded a version of Ross's 1952 song "Twisted", featuring her lyrics set to a Wardell Gray melody. Their High Flying album won a Grammy Award for Best Performance by a Vocal Group in 1962. Lambert, Hendricks & Ross were voted Best Vocal Group in the DownBeat Readers Poll from 1959 to 1963.

Before she married Jackie Paris in 1961, Canadian jazz singer Anne Marie Moss replaced Annie Ross in some early 1960s performances. The group were known as Lambert, Hendricks and Moss.

For personal reasons Annie Ross left the group in 1962 and she was replaced by Yolande Bavan. The band were renamed Lambert, Hendricks and Bavan. Their appearance at the 1962 Newport Jazz Festival, and performances of "Comin' Home" and "Moanin'" can be seen in Buddy Bregman's film The 1962 Newport Jazz Festival. Lambert, Hendricks and Bavan released three live albums before disbanding in 1964.

Any hopes of a reunion of the original trio ended with Lambert's death in a road accident in Connecticut on October 3, 1966.

In 2012, No One But Me, a documentary film about Annie Ross, featured contributions from Hendricks and contained footage of the duo reuniting for a performance. Jon Hendricks died on November 22, 2017. Annie Ross died on July 21, 2020.

== Discography ==
- Sing a Song of Basie (ABC-Paramount, 1957)
- Sing Along with Basie (Roulette, 1958)
- The Swingers! (Pacific Jazz, 1958)
- The Hottest New Group in Jazz (Columbia, 1959)
- Lambert, Hendricks & Ross Sing Ellington (Columbia, 1961)
- High Flying with Lambert, Hendricks & Ross (Columbia, 1961)
- Recorded "Live" at Basin Street East (Lambert, Hendricks and Bavan) (RCA Victor, 1963)
- At Newport '63 (Lambert, Hendricks and Bavan) (RCA Victor, 1963)
- Havin' a Ball at the Village Gate (Lambert, Hendricks and Bavan) (RCA Victor, 1964)
- Swingin' Til the Girls Come Home (Lambert, Hendricks and Bavan) (RCA Bluebird, 1964)
