= Vocalese =

Style of jazz singing

Vocalese is a style of jazz singing in which words are added to an instrumental soloist's improvisation.

== Definition ==
Vocalese uses recognizable lyrics that are sung to pre-existing instrumental solos, as opposed to scat singing, which uses nonsense words such as "bap ba dee dot bwee dee" in solos. In the "first wave" of vocalese creation, that sometimes took the form of a tribute to the original instrumentalist. The word "vocalese" is a play on the musical term "vocalise"; the suffix "-ese" is meant to indicate a sort of language. The term was attributed to Jon Hendricks by the jazz critic Leonard Feather to describe the first Lambert, Hendricks, and Ross album, Sing a Song of Basie.

Most vocalese lyrics are entirely syllabic, as opposed to melismatic. That may lead to the use of many words sung quickly in a given phrase, especially in the case of bebop.

== Notable vocalese performers ==
King Pleasure recorded several pioneering examples of vocalese beginning in 1949. Vocalese's best-known practitioners and popularisers are Lambert, Hendricks and Ross, consisting of Jon Hendricks, Dave Lambert and Annie Ross. Other performers known for vocalese include Bob Dorough, Eddie Jefferson, Giacomo Gates, Kurt Elling, Al Jarreau, Mark Murphy, Roger Miller, New York Voices, The Royal Bopsters and The Manhattan Transfer, whose Grammy-winning version of Weather Report's "Birdland" featured lyrics by Jon Hendricks. In 1990, Hendricks released "Freddie Freeloader", a vocalese rendition of the Miles Davis song, which featured Jarreau, George Benson, and Bobby McFerrin.

Joni Mitchell recorded lyrics to Charles Mingus's tunes, with "The Dry Cleaner from Des Moines" and "Goodbye Pork Pie Hat" on her album, Mingus, in 1979.

Vocalese singers around the world include Les Double Six, popular in the 1960s, and in Canada, Emilie-Claire Barlow.

Some performers, notably Slim Gaillard, Harry Gibson, Cab Calloway, and Leo Watson, combine vocalese improvisations with scat singing.

== See also ==
- Doo-wop
- Scat singing
- Vocal jazz
- Voice instrumental
