= Annie Ross =

British-American jazz singer and actress (1930–2020)

- Born: Annabelle Allan Short; 25 July 1930; Mitcham, Surrey, England
- Died: 21 July 2020 (aged 89); New York City, New York, U.S.
- Citizenship: United Kingdom; United States (after 2001)
- Occupations: Singer; Actress
- Spouse: Sean Lynch (m. 1963; div. 1977)
- Partner: Kenny Clarke (c. 1949); Lenny Bruce (late 1950s)
- Relatives: Jimmy Logan (brother); Ella Logan (aunt)
- Musical career
- Genres: Jazz; bebop; vocal jazz
- Instrument: Vocals
- Years active: 1937–2017
- Formerly of: Lambert, Hendricks & Ross

Annie Ross (born Annabelle Allan Short; 25 July 1930 – 21 July 2020) was a British and American singer and actress, best known as a member of the influential jazz vocal trio Lambert, Hendricks & Ross. She helped pioneer the vocalese style of jazz singing, with a style described by critic Dave Gelly as "a kind of dreamy watchfulness that is a definition of 1950s hip." In 2010, she was named a Jazz Master by the National Endowment for the Arts.

As an actress, Ross appeared in films like Alfie Darling (1976), Yanks (1979), Superman III (1983), Throw Momma from the Train (1987), Pump Up the Volume (1990), and The Player (1992), and had a starring role on the Scottish Television comedy-drama Charles Endell Esquire. She also starred in West End and Broadway musicals, including as Jenny Diver in the 1972 revival of The Threepenny Opera. During the 1960s and 1970s, she ran a nightclub in London.

Kenneth Tynan, who wrote liner notes for Ross, called her "a fallen angel [who] moves us and then brushes off our sympathy with a shrug of her lips."

== Early life ==
Ross was born in Mitcham, Surrey, the daughter of Scottish vaudevillians John "Jack" Short and Mary Dalziel Short (née Allan). Her brother was Scottish entertainer and theatre producer and director Jimmy Logan. She first appeared on stage at age three. At the age of four, she travelled to New York by ship with her family; she later recalled that they "got the cheapest ticket, which was right in the bowels of the ship."

Shortly after arriving in the city, she won a token contract with MGM through a children's radio contest run by Paul Whiteman. She subsequently moved with her aunt, Scottish-American singer and actress Ella Logan, to Los Angeles, and her mother, father and brother returned to Scotland. She did not see her parents again until fourteen years later. At the age of seven, she sang "The Bonnie Banks o' Loch Lomond" in Our Gang Follies of 1938, and played Judy Garland's character's sister in Presenting Lily Mars (1943).

At the age of 14, she wrote the song "Let's Fly", which won a songwriting contest and was recorded by Johnny Mercer and the Pied Pipers.

At the end of 10th grade, she left school, changed her name to Annie Ross, and went to Europe, where she established her singing career. She changed her surname to Ross during the plane trip to Prestwick; in a 2011 interview, she said: "My aunt was very fanciful and she said I had an Irish grandmother called Ross, so that's where that surname came from."

== Career ==
=== Singer ===
In 1952, Ross met Prestige Records owner Bob Weinstock, who asked her to write lyrics to a jazz solo in a similar way to King Pleasure, a practice that would later be known as vocalese. The next day, she presented him with "Twisted", a treatment of saxophonist Wardell Gray's 1949 composition of that title, a classic example of the genre. The song, first released in 1952 (later collected on the album King Pleasure Sings/Annie Ross Sings), was an underground hit, and resulted in her winning Down Beat magazine's New Star award.

In February 1956, the British music magazine NME reported that Ross's version of the song "I Want You to Be My Baby" was banned by the BBC due to the lyric "Come upstairs and have some loving".

She recorded seven albums with Lambert, Hendricks & Ross between 1957 and 1962. Their first, Sing a Song of Basie (1957), was to have been performed by a group of singers hired by Jon Hendricks and Dave Lambert with Ross brought in only as vocal consultant. It was decided that the trio should attempt to record the material and overdub all the additional vocals themselves, but the first two tracks were recorded and deemed unsatisfactory so they ditched the dubbing idea. The resulting album was a success, and the trio became an international hit. Over the next five years, Lambert, Hendricks & Ross toured all over the world and recorded such albums as The Hottest New Group in Jazz (1959), Sing Ellington (1960), High Flying (1962), and The Real Ambassadors (1962), written by Dave Brubeck and featuring Louis Armstrong and Carmen McRae.

Ross left the group in 1962, and move back to England. In 1964, she opened a nightclub in London, Annie's Room. The venue hosted Joe Williams, Nina Simone, Stuff Smith, Blossom Dearie, Anita O'Day, Jon Hendricks, and Erroll Garner.

=== Actress ===
Her adulthood film roles included Liza in Straight On till Morning (1972), Claire in Alfie Darling (1976), Diana Sharman in Funny Money (1983), Vera Webster in Superman III (1983), Mrs. Hazeltine in Throw Momma from the Train (1987), Rose Brooks in Witchery (1988), Loretta Cresswood in Pump Up the Volume (1990), Tess Trainer in Robert Altman's Short Cuts (1993), and Lydia in Blue Sky (1994). She also appeared as Granny Ruth in the horror films Basket Case 2 (1990) and Basket Case 3: The Progeny (1991). She also had a bit part in Robert Altman's The Player in 1992. Ross also starred in Scottish Television's comedy-drama Charles Endell Esquire (1979).

She provided the speaking voice for Britt Ekland in The Wicker Man (1973), and Ingrid Thulin's singing voice in Salon Kitty (1976). On stage, she appeared in Cranks (1955; London and New York City), The Threepenny Opera (1972), The Seven Deadly Sins (1973) at the Royal Opera House, Kennedy's Children (1975) at Arts Theatre, London, a Far East tour of Side by Side by Sondheim, and in the Joe Papp production of The Pirates of Penzance (1982).

== Awards and honors ==
Ross received the ASCAP Jazz Wall of Fame award (2009), the National Endowment for the Arts Jazz Masters' Award (2010), and the MAC Award for Lifetime Achievement (2011).

== Personal life ==
In 1949, Ross had a brief affair with drummer Kenny Clarke. This affair produced a son, Kenny Clarke Jr. (1950–2018), who was raised by Clarke's brother and his wife. During her time with Lambert, Hendricks & Ross, she became addicted to heroin and in the late 1950s had an affair with the comedian Lenny Bruce, who was also having drug problems. By 1960, Carol Sloane was substituting for her on tour. After a performance by the trio in London in May 1962, she remained in London to confront her drug addiction. In 1963, she married actor Sean Lynch; they divorced in 1975, and he died in a car crash soon afterwards. By that time, she had also lost her home and declared bankruptcy.

She became a United States citizen in 2001. In her later years she had a relationship that lasted for the rest of her life with Dave Usher, a businessman and co-founder of Dee Gee Records (along with Dizzy Gillespie), a label for which Ross had recorded in 1952.

=== Death ===
Ross died in New York City on 21 July 2020 from emphysema and heart disease, four days before her 90th birthday.

== Media portrayals ==
In July 2006, a one-woman play entitled TWISTED: The Annie Ross Story by Brian McGeachan premiered at The Space Theatre in London, starring Verity Quade. It focused on her stormy relationship with her aunt, Broadway legend Ella Logan, her brief affair with the comedian Lenny Bruce and her addiction to heroin. The play transferred to the Brockley Jack Theatre in London that same year, with Ross being played by Betsy Pennington.

A documentary about Ross's life, entitled No One But Me, premiered at the Glasgow Film Festival in 2012.

== Discography ==
=== Solo ===
- Sings a Handful of Songs (Ember, 1963)
- Portrait of Annie Ross (Pye, 1965)
- Fill My Heart with Song (Decca, 1968)
- You and Me Baby (Decca, 1971)
- Like Someone in Love (Bulldog, 1983)
- Music Is Forever (DRG, 1996)
- Live in London (Harkit, 2003)
- To Lady with Love (Red Anchor, 2014)

=== As a member of Lambert, Hendricks & Ross ===
- Sing a Song of Basie (ABC-Paramount, 1958)
- The Swingers! with Zoot Sims (World Pacific, 1959)
- Sing Along with Basie with Count Basie, Joe Williams (Roulette, 1959)
- The Hottest New Group in Jazz (Columbia, 1959)
- Sing Ellington with Ike Isaacs (Columbia, 1960)
- High Flying with Ike Isaacs (Columbia, 1961)
- The Real Ambassadors with Louis Armstrong, Dave Brubeck, Carmen McRae (Columbia Masterworks, 1962)
- Everybody's Boppin (Columbia, 1989) compilation

==== With others ====
- New Sounds from France with Jack Dieval, James Moody (Prestige, 1950)
- Annie by Candlelight with Tony Crombie (Pye, Nixa, 1956)
- Cranks with John Cranko, John Addison (His Master's Voice, 1956)
- Gypsy with Buddy Bregman (World Pacific, 1959)
- A Gasser! with Zoot Sims (World Pacific, 1959)
- Annie Ross Sings a Song with Mulligan! with Gerry Mulligan (World Pacific, 1959)
- Loguerhythms: Songs from the Establishment with Tony Kinsey (Transatlantic, 1963)
- Recorded at the Tenth German Jazz Festival in Frankfurt with Pony Poindexter (SABA, 1966)
- Singin' 'n' Swingin with Dorothy Dunn, Shelby Davis (Savoy, 1969)
- In Hoagland with Hoagy Carmichael, Georgie Fame (Bald Eagle, 1981)

== Filmography ==
=== Film ===
Year	Title	Role	Notes	Ref.
1943	Presenting Lily Mars	Rosie	Credited as 'Annebelle Logan'	
1972	Straight On till Morning	Liza		
1973	The Wicker Man	Willow MacGregor (voice)	Dubbed Britt Ekland, uncredited	
1974	The Beast Must Die	Caroline Newcliffe (voice)	Dubbed Marlene Clark, uncredited	
1974	Dead Cert	Mrs. Mervyn	Uncredited	
1976	Alfie Darling	Claire		
1976	Salon Kitty	Kitty Kellermann (singing voice)	Dubbed Ingrid Thulin	
1979	Yanks	Red Cross Lady		
1983	Superman III	Vera Webster		
1983	Funny Money	Diana Sharman		
1987	Throw Momma from the Train	Mrs. Hazeltine		
1988	Trading Hearts	Deputy		
1988	Witchery	Rose Brooks		
1990	Basket Case 2	Granny Ruth		
1990	Pump Up the Volume	Loretta Creswood		
1991	Basket Case 3: The Progeny	Granny Ruth		
1992	The Player	Herself	Cameo appearance	
1993	Short Cuts	Tess Trainer		
1994	Blue Sky	Lydia		

=== Television ===
Year	Title	Role	Notes
1964	ITV Play of the Week	Ellie Dafoe	Episode: "Where Are They Now"
1964	Festival	Voice of the Angel	Episode: "Everyman"
1965	No Hiding Place	Vanessa	Episode: "A Fistful of Trouble"
1976	Crown Court	Theresa Gibson	2 episodes
1977	The Sunday Drama	Kitty	Episode: "Caledonian Cascade"
1978	The Ghosts of Motley Hall	Darlene Dewey	3 episodes
1978	Send in the Girls	Velma Hardy	7 episodes
1979-80	Charles Endell Esquire	Dixie	6 episodes
1980	The Dick Emery Christmas Show: For Whom the Jingle Bells Toll	Maggie	Special
1981	The Good Companions	Ethel Georgia	Miniseries
1982	Month of the Doctors	Penny Pinneo	Miniseries
1992	The New WKRP in Cincinnati	Carrie Caravella	Episode: "Mama Was a Rolling Stone"

== Stage acting credits ==
Year	Title	Role(s)	Venue	Notes
1956	Cranks	Performer	St Martin's Theatre	
1956	Cranks	Performer	Bijou Theatre, Broadway	
1964	All in Love	Lucy	May Fair Theatre	
1969	The Stiffkey Scandals of 1932	Mrs. Flora Osborne, Mrs. Walton, Rusty	Queen's Theatre	
1971	Annie Ross		Hampstead Theatre	One-woman show
1972	The Threepenny Opera	Jenny Diver	Prince of Wales Theatre	
1972	The Threepenny Opera	Jenny Diver	Piccadilly Theatre	
1973	The Seven Deadly Sins		Royal Opera House	
1974	Tonight We Improvise	Performer	Chichester Festival Theatre	
1975	Hello Hollywood Hello	Hedda Louella	Watford Palace Theatre	
1975-76	Kennedy's Children	Carla	Unicorn Theatre	Replacement
1977	Fire	Monica	Westminster Theatre	
1982-83	The Pirates of Penzance	Ruth	Theatre Royal, Drury Lane	
1984	A View from the Bridge	Beatrice	Young Vic	
