= Dave Lambert (American jazz vocalist) =

American jazz lyricist and singer (1917–1966)

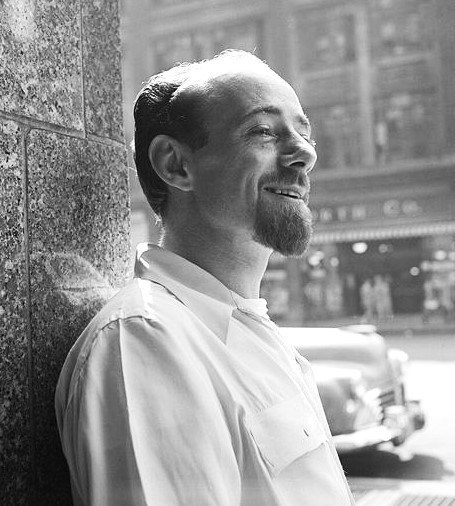
- Lambert in New York City, c. 1947

Background information
- Born: David Alden Lambert; June 19, 1917; Boston, Massachusetts, U.S.
- Died: October 3, 1966 (aged 49) Connecticut Turnpike, Connecticut, U.S.
- Genre: Jazz
- Occupations: Musician, Songwriter
- Instrument: Vocals
- Years active: 1940s–1966

David Alden Lambert (June 19, 1917 – October 3, 1966) was an American jazz lyricist, singer, and an originator of vocalese. He was best known as a member of the trio Lambert, Hendricks & Ross. Lambert spent a lifetime experimenting with the human voice, and expanding the possibilities of its use within jazz. In 2009 Lambert, Hendricks & Ross were all honored with induction into the ASCAP Jazz Wall of Fame.

== Career ==
Lambert's band debut was with Johnny Long's Orchestra in the early 1940s. Along with early partner Buddy Stewart, Lambert successfully brought singing into modern jazz (concurrently with Ella Fitzgerald). In the late 1950s he teamed with wordsmith and vocalese pioneer Jon Hendricks. The two were later joined by Annie Ross, and the lineup was a hit.

After Ross left the group in 1962, Lambert and Hendricks went on without her by using various replacements, but the partnership ended in 1964. He then formed a quintet called "Lambert & Co." which included the multiple voices of Mary Vonnie, Leslie Dorsey, David Lucas, and Sarah Boatner. The group auditioned for RCA in 1964, and the process was documented by filmmaker D. A. Pennebaker in a 15-minute documentary entitled Audition at RCA. It was one of the last images recorded of Lambert, as two years later he was killed in a highway incident.

== Death ==
Lambert died in the early hours of October 3, 1966, after being struck by a tractor-trailer truck on the Connecticut Turnpike while changing a flat tire. The driver of the tractor trailer was Floyd H. Demby. Lambert's disabled vehicle was not fully off the roadway and its lights were turned off.

Richard Hillman was killed in the same incident. Newspaper stories differ about whose vehicle was disabled. Jet magazine's account says it was a panel truck owned by Lambert. Jon Hendricks' telling of the story says that Lambert was a compulsive do-gooder and that he had stopped to assist another motorist. The newspaper follow-up stories say that Demby was not at fault and that Lambert and Hillman were in the roadway when they were struck.
