= Calamity Jane (musical) =

1961 American stage musical

- (A Musical Western)
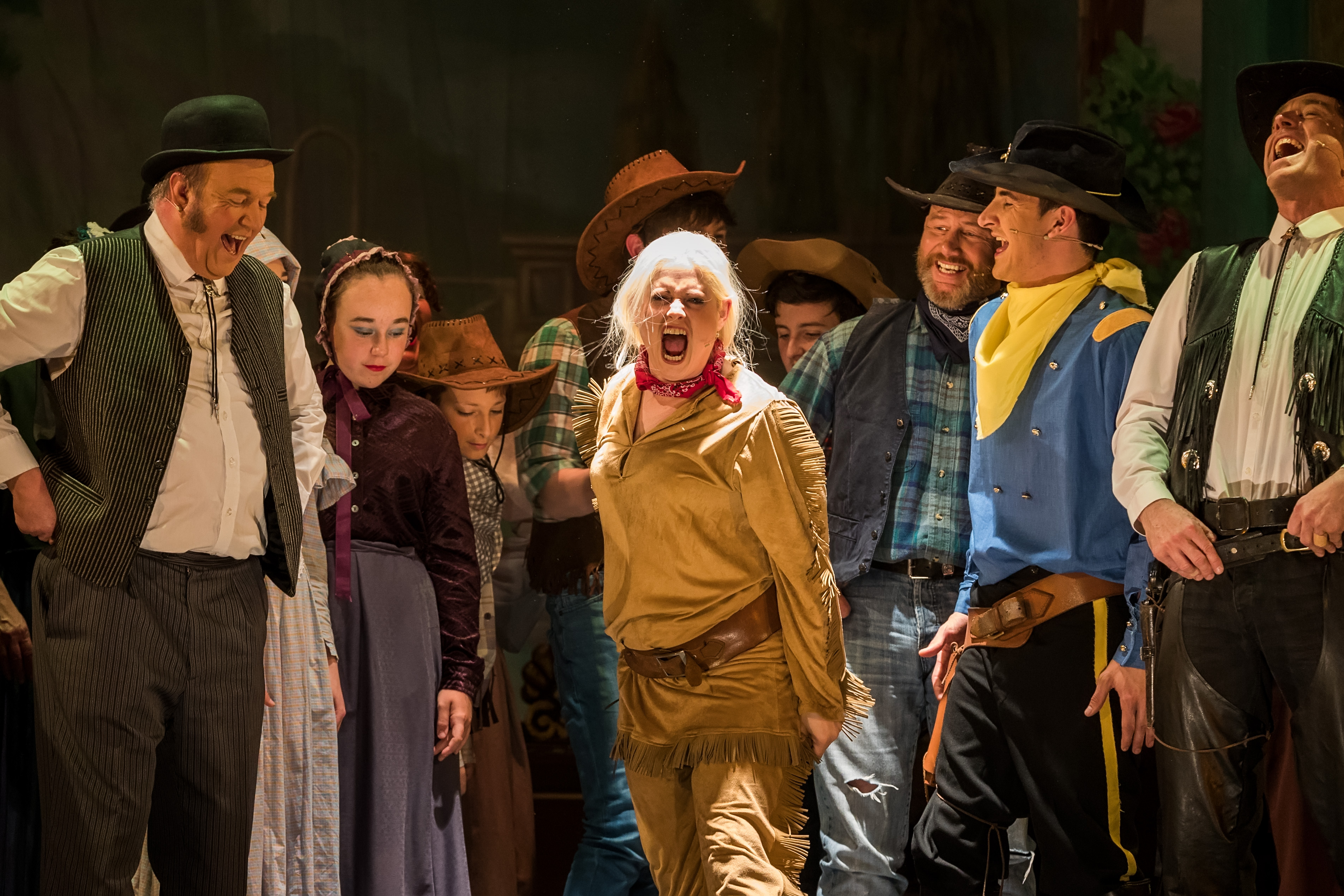
- An April 2017 performance, by Ormskirk Pleasure Folk Amateur Musical Society, at Ormskirk Civic Hall, featuring Liz Wainwright in the title role.
- Music: Sammy Fain
- Lyrics: Paul Francis Webster
- Book: Ronald Hanmer and Phil Park
- Basis: 1953 film Calamity Jane
- Premiere: May 27, 1961: Casa Mañana, Fort Worth, Texas

Calamity Jane (A Musical Western) is a stage musical based on the historical figure of frontierswoman Calamity Jane. The non-historical, somewhat farcical plot involves the authentic Calamity Jane's professional associate Wild Bill Hickok, and presents the two as having a contentious relationship that ultimately proves to be a cover for mutually amorous feelings. The Calamity Jane stage musical was an adaptation of a 1953 Warner Bros. musical film of the same name that starred Doris Day. First produced in 1961, the stage musical Calamity Jane features six songs not heard in the film. According to Jodie Prenger, star of the Calamity Jane 2014–15 UK tour, the songs added for the stage musical had been written for but not included in the Calamity Jane film ("Love You Dearly" had been used in the 1954 Doris Day musical film Lucky Me).

== Credits ==
Adapted by Ronald Hanmer and Phil Park from the stage play by Charles K. Freeman, after the Warner Bros. film, written by James O'Hanlon

Songs by Paul Francis Webster (lyrics) and Sammy Fain (music)

== Synopsis ==
Deadwood City's two most famous peace officers, Calamity Jane and Wild Bill Hickok, get involved in saving the neck of Henry Miller, the local saloon operator. It seems that "Millie" has been promoting a beautiful actress named Frances Fryer, but Frances turns out to be a male, Francis. Millie's attempt to cover up is soon unmasked by the angry miners, and only Calamity can cool the crowd with her trusty pistols. To keep the peace, Calamity sets out for Chicago to bring back the miners' real heart-throb, Adelaid Adams. In Chicago Calamity mistakes Adelaid’s maid, Katie Brown, for the actress and hauls her back to Deadwood. Onstage Katie is greeted warmly, but breaks down and confesses that she is not the famous star. Calamity once more has to restore order and persuades the audience to give Katie a chance. They do, and she wins the heart of every male in town including Calamity's dashing love hope, Lt. Danny Gilmartin. Calamity reluctantly overcomes her jealousy over losing Danny and discovers her true love for Wild Bill.

== Musical numbers ==
Source: Concord Theatricals

Act I

- "The Deadwood Stage (Whip-Crack-Away!)" - Calamity, Bill, Miller, and Company
- "Adelaid" † - Bill and Men
- "Everyone Complains About the Weather" † - Fryer
- "Men!" † - Calamity
- "Careless with the Truth" † - Calamity, Bill, and Men
- "A Hive Full of Honey" - Fryer
- "I Can Do Without You" - Calamity and Bill
- "'Tis Harry I'm Plannin' to Marry" - Adelaid, Boys, and Girls
- "'Tis Harry I'm Plannin' to Marry" (Reprise 1) - Katie
- "Just Blew in from the Windy City" - Calamity and Men
- "Keep It Under Your Hat" - Katie

Act II

- "Higher Than a Hawk" - Bill
- "A Woman's Touch" - Calamity and Katie
- "Love You Dearly" (from Lucky Me) † - Katie and Danny
- "The Black Hills of Dakota" - Company
- "'Tis Harry I'm Plannin' to Marry" (Reprise 2) † - Katie
- "Secret Love" - Calamity
- "Finale" - Company

† Not included in the original film (1953)

== Production history ==
=== In the US ===
The world premiere production of the stage musical version of Calamity Jane ran 27 May - 17 June 1961 at the Casa Mañana in Fort Worth TX: Casa Mañana stock actress Betty O'Neill led this production, touted as "the first try-out of a musical ever staged outside the East or in-the round."

The play then ran from 21 June - 18 July 1961 at the Muny in St Louis with Edie Adams in the title role while Allyn Ann McLerie played Katie - a role she had originated in the 1953 film Calamity Jane - and George Gaynes - McLerie's husband - starred as Wild Bill Hickok. The role of Danny Gilmartin was played by Nolan Van Way.

Excerpted review Pittsburgh CLO performance 1 July 1961
Please note: Abridgements are shown in italics
"'Calamity Jane' is a loud, rollicking show" which "aside from the comedy of Martha Raye ... contains a number of attractive & talented people who sing & dance the evening away"; "No one could accuse Martha Raye of being a great actress, & certainly there were more than a few in the audience who must have winced inwardly over her rendering of 'Secret Love'. But she is a natural slapstick comedienne" ... "this singer without a voice & heroine without glamour whacked & wailed her energetic, boisterous & fun-filled way through 'Calamity Jane' ... Sometimes she is mugging & ad-libbing so furiously that the performance becomes more of a nightclub act than a book show. But after all, the audience has presumably come to see Martha Raye, & that is what it sees."
- Michael Holmberg (The Pittsburgh Press)

On 3 – 8 July 1961, the Pittsburgh CLO (Civic Light Opera) production of Calamity Jane with Martha Raye in the title role played the Civic Arena (Pittsburgh): this production featured George Gaynes as Wild Bill and Allyn Ann McLerie, Gaynes, and McLerie transferring from the Muny production to that of the Pittsburgh CLO for the duration of the latter's engagement.

Excerpted review CBS-TV special 12 November 1963
Please note: Abridgements are shown in italics
"As a musical comedy 'Calamity Jane' ... was nothing to shoot up the town about. But as a vehicle tailored to Carol Burnett's special talents - & they are certainly special - it served very nicely indeed. The 90 minute comedy was taped last summer after playing at State Fair Music Theater (Dallas) & therefore had a polish which is all too often lacking in television productions of this type. This was especially evident in the song-&-dance sequences which were as smooth as a Broadway stage production. The plot was corny enough to afford light-hearted amusement, & Miss Burnett gave it all the hell-bent-for-leather whoop it up treatment which it required. In fact Carol's enthusiasm in the role was at times a bit too much. But never mind. She mugged & yelled & pranced about like a mad woman while giving the broad comedy lines & rowdy songs the merry Dickens as only she can. Then, as a welcome relief, she sang the lovely 'My [sic] Secret Love' straight in a surprisingly enchanting voice ... All in all a jolly good show. And it was really good to have Miss Burnett back with us again". - Win Fanning (Pittsburgh Post-Gazette)

Carol Burnett played the title role in a Starlight Theatre (Kansas City MO) production of Calamity Jane that ran 17 – 30 July 1961. On Burnett's signing an exclusive contract with CBS-TV in the summer of 1962, the network announced that she would headline a televised broadcast of Calamity Jane over the 1962-3 television season. Burnett's Calamity Jane special in fact did not air until the autumn of 1963 after taping that summer. This schedule let Burnett reprise the title role onstage in a State Fair Music Theater (Dallas) production whose two-week run commenced 24 June 1963. (The Pittsburgh CLO had been invited to host Burnett's 1963 live engagement headlining Calamity Jane: however the CLO could not meet the budget). On 10 July 1963 Burnett and her castmates from the Dallas stage production - including Art Lund as Wild Bill - performed Calamity Jane at CBS Studio 50 (NYC), with the play performed non-stop three times before a live audience: CBS-TV taped all three run-throughs, one of which was broadcast as Burnett's debut television special 12 November 1963.

Extra Info
Betty Hutton had starred in the 1950 MGM film version of Annie Get Your Gun. Warner Bros. had hoped to acquire that stage musical as a Doris Day vehicle, but losing the film rights to Annie Get Your Gun led Warner Bros. to develop the 1953 musical film Calamity Jane for Day. Ginger Rogers, who'd campaigned for the Annie Get Your Gun film lead, had led a summer stock production of that musical that played five New England venues - including the Oakdale, the Carousel, and at WMT - in 1960.

Excerpted review Carousel Theater performance July 1962
Please note: Abridgements are shown in italics
"Ginger Rogers with her vivacious charms stomps, boasts & shoots her six-gun with her usual rapport. Her enthusiasm & engaging wry humor both in song & dance affords the audience a delightful evening in which 'Secret Love' is sweetly rendered".

Betty Hutton see Extra Info was scheduled to lead a 1962 summer stock production of Calamity Jane but canceled beforehand due to a protracted pregnancy, and was replaced by Ginger Rogers. see Extra Info Rogers verifiably headlined three engagements of this production: at the Melody Fair in North Tonawanda NY 19–24 June 1962, the Carousel Theater in Framingham MA 2–8 July 1962, and the Oakdale Theatre in Wallingford CT 25–28 July 1962. The same production also played at WMT (Warwick Musical Theatre, Rhode Island) 9–14 July 1962 but Rogers' own participation is not verifiable. (An early credit of Jim Bailey, who'd become a star female impersonator, was as an ensemble member in this tour of Calamity Jane.)

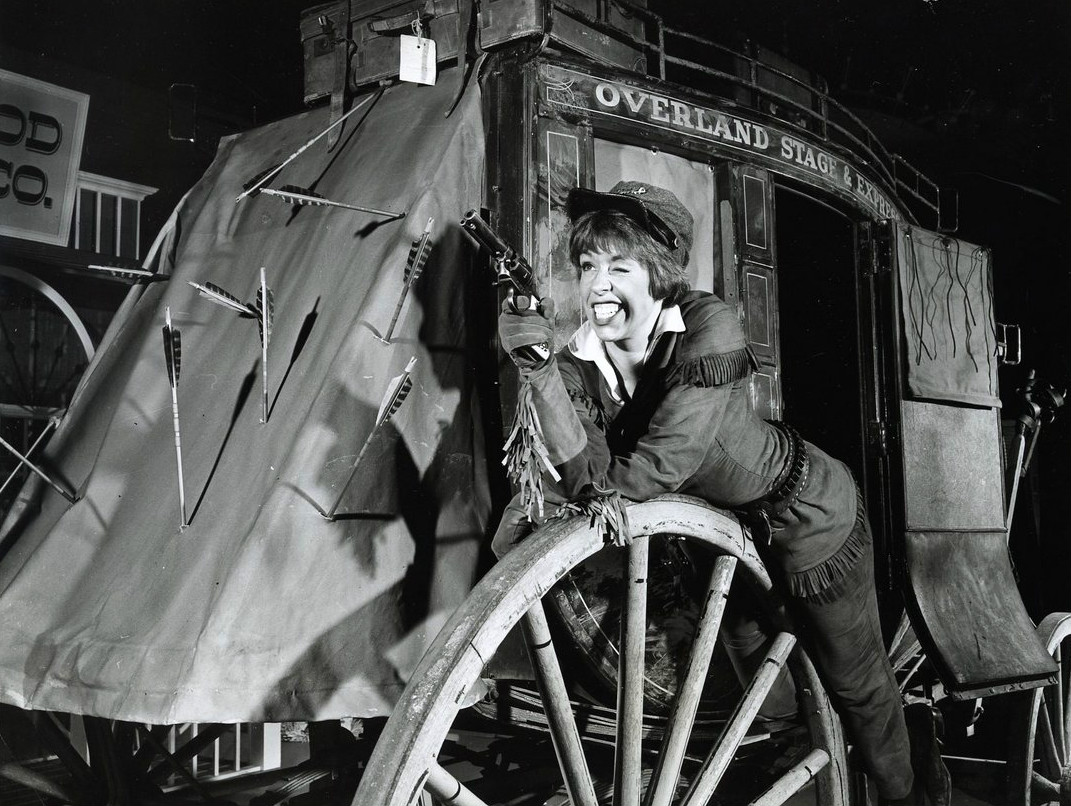
Carol Burnett in the TV production of Calamity Jane, 1963

At the time of the premiere of the stage musical of Calamity Jane, Warner Bros. was considering mounting a Broadway production of the play, but US performances of the stage musical of Calamity Jane have remained essentially confined to the repertory and amateur theater scene. A Broadway production announced in 2005, using a revised book by Randy Skinner, who would also direct and choreograph, failed to materialize—though the prospective production held readings in New York City with C&W singer Louise Mandrell as Calamity Jane and veteran musical actor Brent Barrett as Wild Bill (Barrett had played Frank Butler opposite Reba McEntire in Annie Get Your Gun at the Marquis in 2001). Louise Mandrell eventually headlined a repertory production of Calamity Jane by the Good Company Players, featuring Dan and Emily Pessano, Teddy Maldonado, Brian Pecheau, Tami Cowger, and Jacob Carrillo. The production ran 19 July - 16 September 2012 at Roger Rocka's Dinner Theater in Fresno. Mandrell would then twice headline one-off performances of Calamity Jane, firstly on 11 September at the Folly Theater in Kansas City MO as an event in the Arts Midwest 2015 Conference, and subsequently on 11 October 2015 at the CMA Theatre as an event in the International Entertainment Buyers Association 2015 Conference. The Good Company Players would encore their production of Calamity Jane at Roger Rocka's Dinner Theater July 18-September 15, 2019, with Mandrell again headlining.

On 29 January 2018 two evening performances of what is billed as a concert presentation of Calamity Jane are scheduled for Manhattan supper club Feinstein's/54 Below: the announced performers are Sara Jean Ford as Calamity Jane, Jenn Gambatese as Adelaid Adams, Christopher Gurr as a narrator, Tyler Hanes as Danny Gilmartin, Kara Lindsay as Katie Brown, Michael Park as Henry Miller, Tally Sessions as Wild Bill, and Brandon Uranowitz as Francis Freyer. Also Calamity Jane is scheduled to make its New York City area debut as a full production in a 13–25 March 2018 engagement at the Lion Theatre an off-off-Broadway venue in the Theatre Row complex in Manhattan.

=== In the UK ===
The stage musical version of Calamity Jane has enjoyed a prolific professional production history in the UK, a Sheffield Crucible production which previewed 27 July 1974 and opened 28 July 1974 being billed as "the British professional premiere of 'Calamity Jane'". The Crucible production's title role was played by future screenwriter/ novelist Lynda La Plante billed as Lynda Marchal, and LaPlante/ Marchal in the spring of 1975 again headlined in Calamity Jane at the Belgrade Theatre (Coventry) in the spring of 1975: co-headlined by Leon Greene as Wild Bill Hickok, the Belgrade production's featured cast included Brenda Blethyn as Susan Miller, Geoffrey Burridge as Lt. Danny Gilmartin, David Calder as Henry Miller, and - as an ensemble member - Graham Cole.

Excerpted review 1979 tour engagement
"It was a real metamorphosis to see the eternally effervescent Barbara Windsor as a slightly raucous rootin' tootin' Calamity Jane. Hers is a wonderful portrayal of a gun toting female who had little time for men...she brought to her part a panache, a great deal of well directed energy". - The Stage'

In 1979, Barbara Windsor headlined the first UK tour of Calamity Jane. After its premiere engagement at the Billingham Forum, which opened 27 August 1979, this production toured for twelve weeks to conclude with a November 1979 date at the Sunderland Empire. Windsor's co-star as Wild Bill was Eric Flynn, and Norman Vaughan was featured as Francis Fryer: at the tour's premiere engagement in Billingham the role of Henry Miller was played by Jeffrey Holland filling in for the ailing Dudley Owen who evidently played out the remaining engagements. Toyah Willcox, while promoting her own headlining Calamity Jane tour in 2002, told Terry Grimley of the Birmingham Post: "Barbara Windsor did this show twenty years ago and it was due to go into the West End, but there were some problems with her private life." The touring production of Calamity Jane with Barbara Windsor did occasion the musical's London-area premiere, as the production played the Ashcroft Theatre (Croydon) 18–29 September 1979.

Louise Gold starred in a production of Calamity Jane at the Leicester Haymarket 22 November 1994 - 28 January 1995 with Ricco Ross as Wild Bill, while the play's premiere central London production played 9 December 1994 - 21 January 1995 at the Battersea Arts Centre, with Leigh McDonald in the title role.

Excerpted review Sadler's Wells performance June 1996
"These days few actors relish the rigours of touring but the cast of 'Calamity Jane' ... at Sadler's Wells ... seem as fresh as the flowers of spring. Not least Gemma Craven in the title role ... The story ... is an excuse for singing & dancing, as admirers of Doris Day will remember. Ms Day was of course incomparable, but Ms Craven survives the inevitable comparison extremely well, acting, singing & dancing beautifully. She haunts us with the declaration of her 'Secret Love' & the whole cast combine to send us away serenading 'The Black Hills of Dakota'. The sets are surprisingly good for a touring production & the show is as jolly as a pantomime — but with better songs." - Roy Shaw (The Tablet)

Gemma Craven starred in a production of Calamity Jane at Sadler's Wells 21 May - 15 June 1996 as the seventh engagement of an eleven engagement national tour that launched with a 29 February - 16 March 1996 Belgrade Theatre engagement. Stephen McGann played Wild Bill and Stuart Pendred was Danny Gilmartin in this production. Its final engagement was in Newcastle.

Excerpted reviews Shaftesbury Theatre performance June 2003
Please note: Abridgements are shown in italics
"The somewhat naive charm of the thigh-slappin' gun-totin' original movie has dissolved in a production reeking of gingham & lukewarm feminism, which does not have enough tongue-in-cheek humour to carry off Calamity's transition from bar-brawling man-fighter to petticoatwearing man-eater ... despite Ed Curtis's lively direction & Sammy Fain's catchy tunes, the script is not nearly sharp enough for 'Calamity Jane' to be admired either as a period piece or as a retro-classic. As a result, the production lives or dies by Willcox's performance, an unfortunately forced twodimensional affair" - Rachel Hallibuton (London Evening Standard) 27 June 2003	"This stage adaptation ... is considerably more hit-and-miss than the Doris Day movie ...You can't accuse ponytail-tossing Toyah of giving less than her heart & soul to the part. She throws herself into the sharpshooting tomboy athleticism, & she's fine at projecting the heroine's emotional innocence & fired-up enthusiasm. But Calamity needs to be able to dominate vocally too, & Willcox does not have the necessary command. She's heavily miked & this emphasises that distracting sibilance in her delivery ... compared to Day's crispness of attack Willcox sounds soggy...There are sequences where the show springs fully to life, as when our heroine stirs the town to a shuffling dance with her report on 'The Windy City'. But the stage version makes less, rather than more, of the movie's merits." - Paul Taylor (The Independent) 1 July 2003

Excerpted review Shaftesbury Theatre performance July 2003
Please note: Abridgements are shown in italics
"This hyperactive, 'Annie Get Your Gun'-type Wild West songfest stars Toyah Willcox ... who fairly batters you into admiring her irredeemably perky performance : she's constantly moving, singing, dances like an irritating leprechaun, & expends more energy in one evening than I have in the past twenty years"; "Under the steady hand of director Ed Curtis, the young & inexperienced cast members (many making their professional debuts here) are well drilled. Craig Revel Horwood's choreography, though at first sub-Agnes de Mille, blossoms outwards to remind the audience of what was so special about his work for 'My One and Only'"; The simple wooden sets are more than serviceable, & James Whiteside's lighting is suitably lurid for the Black Hills of Dakota"; "The memorable score by Sammy Fain ... helps to overcome the feeling that this cheerful, hard-working production does not really belong on the West End stage." - Sheridan Morley (New Statesman)

In 2002 and 2003 Toyah Willcox led a production of Calamity Jane that toured throughout Great Britain with the first leg of the tour playing nine cities, the inaugural engagement being at the Derngate Theatre (Northampton) 9 – 14 September 2002 with the ninth venue played being the Alexandra Theatre (Birmingham) whose engagement ran 11 – 16 November 2002. The second leg of the Calamity Jane tour led by Willcox had an inaugural 20–25 January 2003 engagement at the King's Theatre (Glasgow) then played fifteen subsequent engagements to conclude with a 26 June - 20 September 2003 engagement - previewed from 12 June 2003 - at the Shaftesbury Theatre in Holborn, it having been announced in April 2003 that this production of Calamity Jane would have a limited-run summer engagement at the Shaftesbury thus marking the West End debut of any production of the Calamity Jane stage musical. Interviewed at the time of the opening of Calamity Jane at the Shaftesbury, Toyah Willcox stated: "We've kind of revamped it so it's more 'West End' and we've put big dance numbers in. We've added a bit more b******t to it!" although she maintained: "Our production is not saccharine sweet, it's really very ballsy. There are no sequins in our production whatsoever!" corroborating statements she'd made earlier in the tour's run as "This isn't a sequinned production. We've tried to make it gritty."

Thom Southerland directed an off-West End revival of Calamity Jane at Upstairs at the Gatehouse 8 June 8–3 July 2010: Phyllida Crowley Smith choreographed this production, which featured Katherine Eames in the title role.

Excerpted review Milton Keynes Theatre performance 25 November 2014
Please note: Abridgements are shown in italics
"Jodie Prenger is magnificent in the title role. Not only can she sing & act: she has the ability to light up any stage ... I could feel that the entire audience had fallen in love with her"; "The supporting cast are all incredibly strong"; "The best numbers are those which see the cast playing instruments whilst singing & dancing ... their energy is infectious whilst their talents are hugely impressive"; "Providing just over two hours of joyous fun ... Nikolai Foster's production of 'Calamity Jane' bursts with irresistible charm. It's impossible not to clap along with the finale & leave with a spring in your step." - Andrew Tomlins (WestEndFrame.com) 25 November 2014

Excerpted review Grand Opera House (York) performance February 2015
Please note: Abridgements are shown in italics
"'Calamity Jane' is a blast of a show & is played in that spirit by principals & ensemble alike, who add to the enjoyment with their actor-musician skills, playing all manner of instruments"; "Jodie Prenger is a big hit as Calamity: she is as abrasive as sandpaper with a vulnerability that steadily seeps through. For all the professional polish, Prenger has just the right amount of spit too ... She has a natural sense of fun, so important to this musical, & she bonds readily & amusingly with her co-stars ... Best of all, her serenading singing of 'Secret Love' brings out all the sudden release of emotion in that Valentine favourite." - Charles Hutchinson (The Press) 12 February 2015

Excerpted review New Wimbledon Theatre performance February 2015
Please note: Abridgements are shown in italics
"Now touring the UK is Charles K Freeman's adaptation of the 'Calamity Jane' film, a production that began life at the resourceful Watermill Theatre under the direction of Nikolai Foster. It's another of their musicians-as-performers productions, which see the traditional pit orchestra replaced by onstage performers who play various instruments. More than that, the entire production adopts a make-do philosophy which sees the orchestral accompaniment as just another of the clever something-from-nothing design imperatives"; "Prenger, though wildly miscast since she is unmistakably all woman ... has an easy, broad comic style ... Vocally, she is in good form although 'Secret Love' is not the peak musical moment it could be, the long brilliant notes that make that song wonderful don't get proper attention, but that is not to say Prenger does not get away with it"; "This production is a theatrical treat: a good, old fashioned musical done in a new fangled way. It's great to hear such good songs so well sung by a cast that basically accompanies itself. Prenger's crowd pleasing turn as Calamity, together with first class support ... ensures an evening that moves along at 'Whip Crack Away' pace & makes you long for those 'Black Hills of Dakota'." - Stephen Collins (BritishTheatre.com) 23 March 2015

Jodie Prenger starred in a production of Calamity Jane whose 17 July - 6 September 2014 engagement at the Watermill Theatre (Berks) inaugurated a national tour of intended six months duration: however interest in booking this production was sufficiently high as to allow for its playing constant engagements for more than twelve months, with venues played throughout Great Britain - plus a 19 – 23 May 2015 engagement at Bord Gáis Energy Theatre, Dublin - with two London-area engagements: 17–21 March 2015 at the New Wimbledon Theatre and - as the tour's final engagement - 4 – 8 August 2015 at the Richmond Theatre. This production of Calamity Jane - which co-starred Tom Lister as Wild Bill - - had its 1 July 2015 matinée performance at the Curve (Leicester) recorded as a 360-degree video made available for complementary online viewing 22–24 July 2015.

Comments of Nikolai Foster, director of the 2014 - 15 UK touring production of Calamity Jane
[At first] I thought it was an old potboiler of a thing. And actually the film is so beautiful & gracious & Doris Day is captured in that iconic & breathtakingly brilliant performance ... [The] 2003 production with Toyah Willcox, I thought the script was not very good & didn't offer anything up that is better than the film. Then we were given permission to really look at the script to make it feel fresh & contemporary. Extended comments To begin with when producer Jamie Wilson suggested it my heart sank, I thought it was an old potboiler of a thing. And actually the film is so beautiful & gracious and Doris Day is captured in that iconic & breathtakingly brilliant performance. So why on earth would you try & do it on stage? Having seen Ed Curtis's 2003 production with Toyah Willcox, I thought the script was not very good & didn't offer anything up that is better than the film. Then we were given permission to really look at the script to make it feel fresh & contemporary. Crucially we cut out all the racism, the way the indigenous Native Americans are dealt with stereotypically. It's a love story & about Calamity Jane being accepted how we view women, how women have had to assume a more masculine role to be seen as equals to their male counterparts. At the end Calamity Jane is accepted for who she is & that's quite a powerful message today."	While remaining true to the essence of who she is throughout the whole play she goes on this extraordinary journey where through the people she meets & the new friends she makes ... she learns to accept help & crucially to accept love ... It's very exciting to take something from such a traditional period of music theatre history & give it just enough of a modern edge & just enough of a contemporary twist ... Fans of 'Calamity Jane' the movie will be just as intoxicated [by] our production ... The principal reason for that is of course this iconic central character ... & then we're blessed with Jodie Prenger taking the title role in our production ... Jodie's got all of the technical ability: that's a given but it's the star quality [such as] Doris Day had in the film & we're blessed that Jodie brings in such extraordinary generous bucketfuls to this production. Extended comments What's extraordinary about her is that while remaining true to the essence of who she is throughout the whole play she goes on this extraordinary journey where through the people she meets & the new friends she makes on this wonderful journey she learns to accept help & crucially to accept love, & to let people into her life & she realizes she doesn't quite have to be as tough & as fiery all the time, & that actually a bit of love & a bit of fire make for a really well-rounded human being. She's an incredible woman & just a joy to be creating our version of her with Jodie ... One of the principal reasons for choosing to work on this new production of 'Calamity Jane' was that I think as a director that it appeals to young theatre-goers today but also those people who might remember it from the first time 'round still sort of get that nostalgiac kick from it so sort of mixing a bit of new with the old ... I think fans of 'Calamity Jane' the movie will be just as intoxicated & will fall in love with our production just as much, & I think the principal reason for that is of course this iconic central character & when you think of Calamity Jane as a character in history she's an incredibly rich detailed dynamic sort of leading role. Then of course when you add to that real person Doris Day & her incredible portrayal on film, & then we're blessed with Jodie Prenger taking the title role in our production I think it sort of means all of the ingredients are just coming together at the right time. And Jodie's extraordinary because of course she has all of the modern sensibilities that are attractive to us in a leading performer but she also has a great appreciation of the past & the line[age] of those sort of incredible Broadway performances & those performers & I think on top of that Jodie's relationship with her audience & her sense of humanity, of warmth, & chutzpah & life are just intoxicating. Jodie's got all of the technical ability: that's a given but it's the star quality, that sort of thing: that spell that you can't quite quantify but of course Doris Day had in the film & we're blessed that Jodie brings in such extraordinary generous bucketfuls to this production.

Jodie Prenger on the role of Calamity Jane
She ie. the historical Calamity Jane was obviously quite a gal, & there are so many stories about her, both for her & against her. Her own account of her life is, as you'd suspect, very positive & very colourful. Other people who knew her were less enthusiastic. She was certainly feisty & very gutsy. But in the end all I can do is play her as she's been written for the show, larger than life but with a vulnerable side. And I rather like those two contrasts.

The earliest known theatrical credit of star mezzo-soprano Katherine Jenkins was in a school production of Calamity Jane at Dwr-y-Felin Comprehensive when she was a student there circa 1994, Jenkins playing the role of Katie.

On 30 May 2024, it was announced that director Nikolai Foster would revive his 2014 - 2015 production of Calamity Jane for a 30 city tour, scheduled to premiere with a January 14 – 18 2025 engagement at Aylesbury Waterside Theatre. Besides playing 29 cities throughout Great Britain, this production is set for an August 19–23, 2025 engagement at Bord Gais Energy Theatre in Dublin. Calamity Jane is scheduled for two London venues, with a May 13 – 17 2025 engagement at New Wimbledon Theatre and a September 16 – 20 engagement at the Churchill Theatre in Bromley, the latter being the thirtieth and final engagement of the scheduled tour. Carrie Hope Fletcher has been announced as the tour's headliner.

=== In Australia ===
Excerpted review Hayes Theatre 10 March 2017
Please note: Abridgements are shown in italics
"The highfalutin' way to describe director Richard Carroll's 'Calamity Jane' is to say its abundant meta-theatrics put a contemporary, ironic frame around an old-fashioned musical, revealing fresh insights. The perky simplicity of the 1953 Doris Day film ... gives way to a much more nuanced 21st-century take on a mid-20th-century interpretation of an unconventional 19th-century woman ... The low-falutin' truth is that along with being outstandingly clever, 'Calamity Jane' is gut-bustingly funny and has an extraordinarily generous heart."

"Crucially, it is blessed with a central performance as fine as any seen on our musical stages since, I don't know, forever. Virginia Gay's Calamity is a roiling mass of powerful contradictions: physically strong and emotionally insecure, she can ride and shoot with the best of them but off a horse is a klutz; she's blustery and bashful; resourceful and inept. Most of all, she is desperate to be loved and perhaps it doesn't really matter by whom. Whether Gay is assiduously tending to the wounds of dashing Lieutenant Danny Gilmartin (Matthew Pearce), getting domestic with imported pin-up Katie Brown (Laura Bunting) or discovering ... that her old sparring mate Wild Bill Hickok (Anthony Gooley) feels something for her, her eagerness makes Calam achingly vulnerable."

"Carroll's production makes having a tiny budget look like a brilliant artistic choice. With music director Nigel Ubrihien at the upright piano there's a band of precisely one, augmented by cast members on guitar, ukulele, trombone, accordion and tuba. As there are only seven actors, Ubrihien is conscripted into the ensemble, as is the audience. Participation has never seemed so natural. Sheridan Harbridge, Rob Johnson and Tony Taylor round out the whip-smart acting team in a variety of secondary roles that provide comedy gold of the highest grade, designer Lauren Peters's Old West saloon is beautifully lit by Trent Suidgeest and Cameron Mitchell's choreography is a hoot. Adding to the general delight is the truly gorgeous score by Sammy Fain (music) and Paul Francis Webster (lyrics), blissfully heard unamplified."

"I confidently predict 'Calamity Jane' will get a standing ovation from the entire house at every performance. I have my reasons, but see for yourself."

Neglected Musicals presented a staged reading of Calamity Jane from 3 August 2016 for six presentations: playing at the Hayes Theatre in Potts Point, Sydney and starring Virginia Gay. This was Calamity Janes professional debut in Australia although the play has a long production history via Australian amateur troupes, having been mounted as early as 1965 by the then-amateur Brisbane Repertory with future television star Rowena Wallace in the title role: it was during the Brisbane Repertory production's 20 – 29 May 1965 run Wallace was discovered by actor Barry Creyton. Virginia Gay reprised the title role in a full production of Calamity Jane which played the Hayes Theatre from 8 March - 1 April 2017 and which then toured to at several venues in southeastern Australia in 2018.

== Recordings ==
There is a complete recording of the entire score of Calamity Jane available, recorded for JAY Records in 1995: it includes Debbie Shapiro as Calamity Jane with Jason Howard, Tim Flavin and Susannah Fellows. A "cast album" of the 1996 production of Calamity Jane starring Gemma Craven - who is in fact the sole vocalist on the album - was issued in 1996.
