= My Weekly Reader =

Studio album by Nellie McKay
- Released: 24 March 2015
- Recorded: 2014–2015
- Genre: Pop, Jazz
- Length: 48:00
- Label: 429 Records
- Producer: Geoff Emerick; Nellie McKay

Nellie McKay chronology
Home Sweet Mobile Home (2010)	My Weekly Reader (2015)	Sister Orchid (2018)

My Weekly Reader is the sixth studio album by American singer-songwriter Nellie McKay, consisting of covers of hits from the 1960s. The album entered the Billboard Heatseekers Albums chart, and garnered positive reviews upon its release.

== Background and release ==
"My Weekly Reader is Nellie McKay's sixth album, and second cover album, following her Doris Day tribute album "Normal as Blueberry Pie." The record consists entirely of covers of hits from the 1960s, including songs by Frank Zappa, Gerry and the Pacemakers, and Moby Grape. McKay enlisted Dweezil Zappa, Frank Zappa's son, to play guitar on her cover of his father's "Hungry Freaks, Daddy;" she also enlisted Bela Fleck to play banjo. Geoff Emerick, who had produced McKay's debut album, "Get Away From Me", was enlisted to co-produce the album with McKay, as well. The album was released physically and digitally on March 24, 2015. To promote the album, McKay performed at 54 Below in New York City.

== Critical reception ==
Professional ratings
Aggregate scores
Source	Rating
Metacritic	68/100
Review scores
Source	Rating
AllMusic	3/5 stars
Cuepoint (Expert Witness)	A−
PopMatters	8/10 stars
Rolling Stone	3.5/5 stars

My Weekly Reader was met with mostly positive reviews from critics. On review aggregation website Metacritic, the album holds a score of 68, indicating "generally favorable reviews". In a positive review, PopMatters' Steve Horowitz awarded the album 8 stars (out of a possible 10), commenting that the album "kicks serious butt," and praising McKay's minimal changes to most of the compositions. Horowitz also praised the album's nostalgia, commenting that "McKay understands the complexity of the past and reveals her empathy for a more hopeful time when love and peace were fresh thoughts rather than a debased slogan." Rolling Stone's review, written by Will Hermes, was similarly positive, calling McKay a "renegade songwriter with an ultraflexible Great American Songbook sensibility," also feeling that "her musical smarts add the context." National Public Radio's review, penned by Ken Tucker, was positive towards the album as well, commenting that "there's a pleasing tension between the content of the lyric and the lovely purity of her vocals," and praising her modernization of some of the material.

Some critics had more mixed feelings regarding the album. Stephen Thomas Erlewine, writing for AllMusic, felt that while McKay sometimes "achieves a delicate balance between '60s reverence and a sly modern wink, a blurring of eras that plays to her strengths," she had ultimately made "odd" song selections that he felt were poorly-modernized; Erlewine awarded the album 3 stars. The Boston Globe's Marc Hirsch was also critical of the album, calling the production "flat and dull" and expressing mixed feelings over McKay's minimal changes to the songs.

== Track listing ==
No.	Title	Original performer	Length
1.	"Sunny Afternoon"	The Kinks	3:09
2.	"Quicksilver Girl"	Steve Miller Band	3:09
3.	"Poor People/Justice"	Alan Price	3:36
4.	"Murder in My Heart for the Judge"	Moby Grape	5:30
5.	"Bold Marauder"	Mimi and Richard Fariña	3:49
6.	"Itchycoo Park"	Small Faces	3:27
7.	"Mrs. Brown You've Got a Lovely Daughter"	Herman's Hermits	2:12
8.	"Not So Sweet Martha Lorraine"	Country Joe & the Fish	5:16
9.	"If I Fell"	The Beatles	2:40
10.	"Red Rubber Ball"	The Cyrkle	3:37
11.	"Don't Let the Sun Catch You Crying"	Gerry and the Pacemakers	2:26
12.	"Hungry Freaks, Daddy"	Frank Zappa	4:35
13.	"Wooden Ships"	Crosby, Stills, & Nash	4:34
Total length:			48:00

== Personnel ==
Adapted from AllMusic.

Musicians

- Béla Fleck — banjo
- Bob Glaub — electric bass
- Nellie McKay — bells, clarinet, congas, cymbals, harmonica, keyboards, maracas, marimbas, organ, piano, tambourine, ukulele, all vocals
- Cary Park — banjo, 12-string guitar, acoustic guitar, electric guitar, steel guitar
- David Raven — drums
- Dweezil Zappa — guitar (on "Hungry Freaks, Daddy")

Production

- Craig Parker Adams — assistant engineer
- Greg Calbi — mastering
- Geoff Emerick — engineering, mixing, production
- Spencer Guerra — mixing
- Nellie McKay — production

Design

- David Alan Kogut — art direction, photography

== Charts ==
Chart (2015)	Peak position
Billboard Heatseekers Albums	15
