= Bob Dorough =

American pianist, singer, and composer (1923–2018)

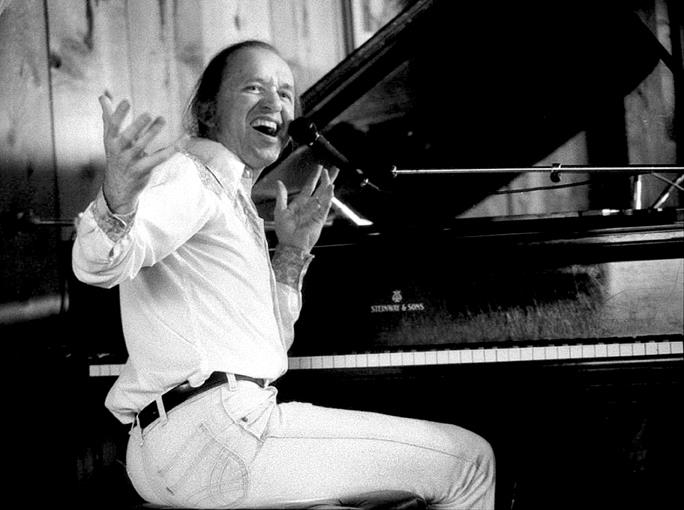
- Dorough in the 1980s

Background information
- Born: Robert Lrod [sic] Dorough; December 12, 1923; Cherry Hill, Arkansas, U.S.
- Died: April 23, 2018 (aged 94) Mount Bethel, Pennsylvania, U.S.
- Genre: Jazz
- Occupations: Musician, composer, arranger, producer
- Instruments: Vocals, piano
- Years active: 1940s–2018
- Labels: Bethlehem, Music Minus One, Capitol, 52e Rue Est, Focus, Red, Blue Note, Arbors, Candid
- Formerly of: Sam Most, Bill Takas, Dave Frishberg, Blossom Dearie

Robert Lrod Dorough (December 12, 1923 – April 23, 2018) was an American bebop and cool jazz vocalist, pianist, and composer. He became famous as the composer and performer of songs in the TV series Schoolhouse Rock!, as well as for his work with Miles Davis, Blossom Dearie, and others.

== Early life ==
Robert Lrod Dorough was born in Cherry Hill, Polk County, Arkansas and grew up in Plainview, Texas. During World War II, he participated in Army bands as pianist, clarinetist, saxophonist, and arranger. After that, he attended North Texas State University, where he studied composition and piano.

== Career ==
From 1949 to 1952, Dorough was a graduate student at Columbia University in New York City, and on the side played piano at local jazz clubs. He was hired for a tour by boxer Sugar Ray Robinson, who had interrupted his boxing career to pursue music. In Paris from 1954 to 1955 he worked as a musician and musical director, recording with jazz vocalist Blossom Dearie.

When Dorough returned to the United States, he moved to Los Angeles, where he performed in various clubs, including a job between sets by comedian Lenny Bruce. His first album, Devil May Care, came out in 1956 and contained a version of Charlie Parker's "Yardbird Suite" with lyrics added by Dorough. Jazz trumpeter Miles Davis liked the album, and in 1962 when Columbia Records asked Davis to make a Christmas record, he sought out Dorough to provide lyrics and vocals. "Blue Xmas" appeared on the compilation album Jingle Bell Jazz. During that session Dorough recorded another song for Davis, "Nothing Like You," which appeared a few years later at the end of the Sorcerer album, making Dorough one of the few musicians with a vocal performance on a Miles Davis record.

In 1969, Dorough participated as arranger, choir vocalist, and pianist for beat poet Allen Ginsberg's 1970 LP Songs of Innocence and Experience, a musical adaptation of William Blake's poetry collection of the same name.

From 1972 to 1996, and for direct-to-video releases in 2002 and 2009, Dorough wrote and directed episodes of Schoolhouse Rock!, an educational animated series that appeared on TV. He got the job when advertiser David McCall asked him in 1969 to put the multiplication tables to music, with "Three Is a Magic Number" earning him the job as the series' musical director. Dorough wrote all the songs for Multiplication Rock, the first of six eventual subject areas (the others being Grammar Rock, America Rock, Science Rock, Money Rock and Earth Rock, to which he also contributed songs and performances). De La Soul ensured Dorough was to be remembered after "Magic Number" sampled his song during their first flush of success in 1989.

With his friend Ben Tucker, Dorough wrote the song "Comin' Home Baby", which gave Mel Tormé a Top 40 hit and two Grammy Award nominations. He was a partner for many years with Stuart Scharf, producing two albums for the folk-pop band Spanky and Our Gang and adding jazz arrangements to their sound. Spanky recorded Dorough's 1-3-5-8 (Pedagogical Round #2), a clever round where the lyrics indicate the notes.

Dorough was the vocalist for The 44th Street Portable Flower Factory, recording cover versions of popular music for Scholastic Records in the early 1970s. Dorough remained with the show from 1973 to 1985.

=== Later career ===
From 1985 to 1993 he toured Europe several times with the saxophone player Michael Hornstein, bassist Bill Takas and drummer Fred Braceful.

At the age of 73, Dorough, whose previous albums had been released by smaller, more obscure labels, signed his first contract with a major record label, Blue Note Records.

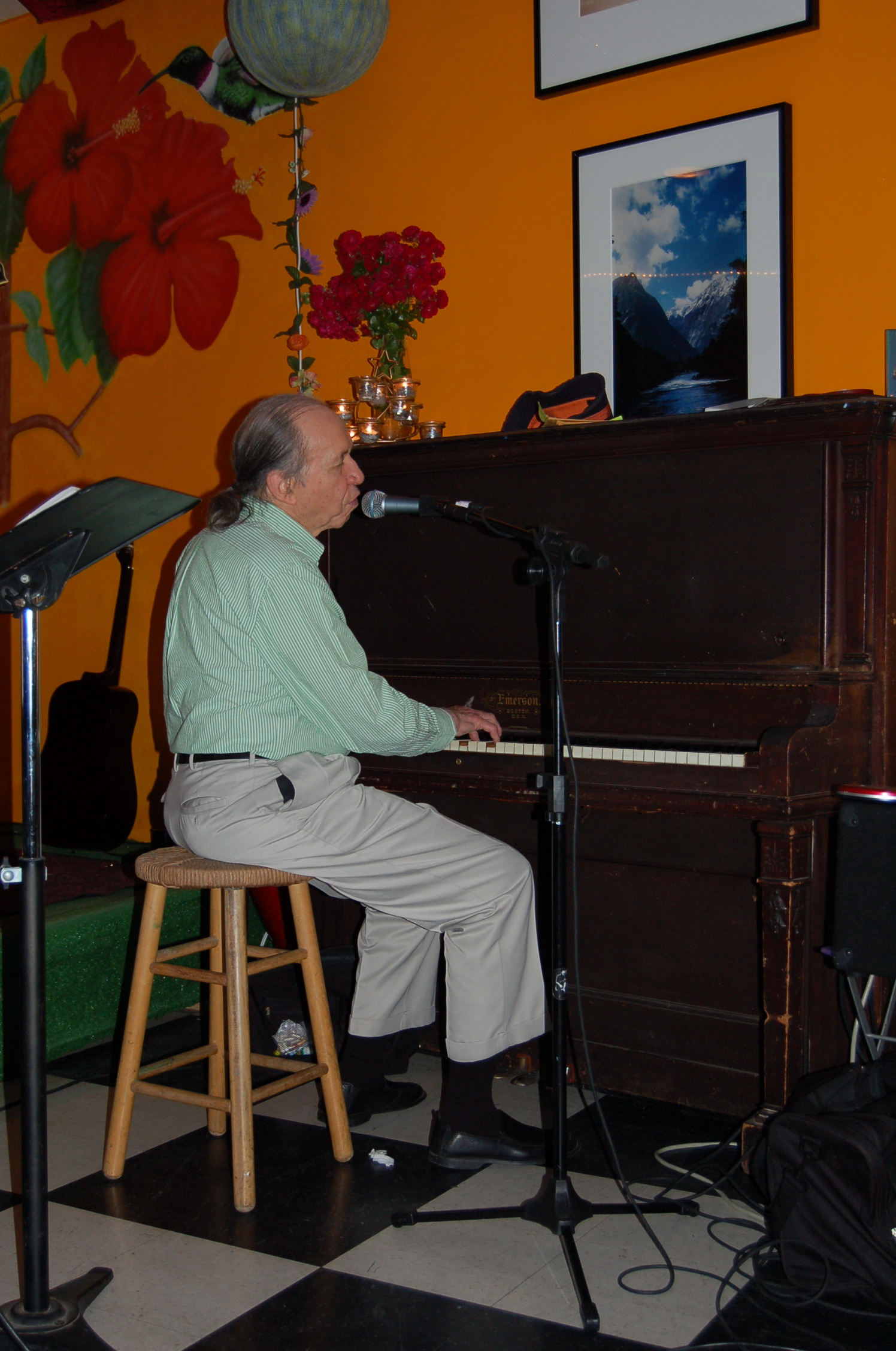
Dorough in 2006

Dorough worked with Nellie McKay on her 2007 album Obligatory Villagers as well as her 2009 release Normal as Blueberry Pie – A Tribute to Doris Day.

He continued to do occasional work intended for children. He wrote an illustrated book of Blue Xmas, published by Circumstantial Productions, and three songs to accompany Maureen Sullivan's books about Carlos the French bulldog: Ankle Soup, Custard and Mustard and Christmas Feet.

== Death ==
Dorough died on April 23, 2018, at his home in Mount Bethel, Pennsylvania, at the age of 94.

== Awards and honors ==
- In 1974, Dorough received a Grammy nomination for Best Recording for Children.
- In 1998, Dorough was inducted into the Arkansas Jazz Hall of Fame.
- He received Artist of the Year at the 2002 Pennsylvania Governor's Awards for the Arts.
- In December 2007, Dorough was honored by East Stroudsburg University of Pennsylvania with a Doctor of Fine Arts honorary degree.
- In 2019, the Schoolhouse Rock! soundtrack was selected by the Library of Congress for preservation in the National Recording Registry for being "culturally, historically, or aesthetically significant".
- In 2019, he was recognized as a 2019 Jazz Master by the National Endowment for the Arts.

== Discography ==
=== As leader ===
- Devil May Care (Bethlehem, 1956)
- Just About Everything (Focus, 1966)
- I'll Never Fall in Love Again (Music Minus One, 1970)
- A Taste of Honey (Music Minus One, 1972)
- Multiplication Rock (Capitol, 1973)
- Watch What Happens! (Music Minus One, 1974)
- Beginning to See the Light with Bill Takas (Laissez-Faire, 1976)
- An Excursion Through "Oliver!" (Music Minus One, 1963)
- Devil May Care (52e Rue Est, 1983)
- Hoagy's Children with Dick Sudhalter, Barbara Lea (Audiophile, 1983)
- Sing and Swing with Bill Takas (Red, 1984)
- Clankin' on Tin Pan Alley with Bill Takas (Bloomdido, 1986)
- Skabadabba (Pinnacle, 1987)
- Songs of Love (Orange Blue, 1988)
- This Is a Recording of Pop Art Songs (Laissez-Faire, 1991)
- Right On My Way Home (Blue Note, 1997)
- Too Much Coffee Man (Blue Note, 2000)
- Who's On First? with Dave Frishberg (Blue Note, 2000)
- To Communicate (Vivid Sound, 2004)
- Sunday at Iridium (Arbors, 2004)
- Complete Recordings with Sam Most (Lone Hill, 2004)
- Small Day Tomorrow (Candid, 2006)
- The Devils Best Tunes: The Beatnik Scat of Bob Dorough (Fingertips, 2011)
- Duets (COTAjazz, 2012)
- Eulalia (Merry Lane, 2014)
- But for Now (Enja, 2015)
- Live at the Deer Head Inn (Deer Head, 2016)

=== Singles ===
- "Ankle Soup" (2011)
- "Christmas Feet" (2011)
- "Custard and Mustard" (2011)
- "'P' is for the People" (2011)
- "Blue Xmas (To Whom It May Concern)" Columbia Records/Blue Vinyl/Record Store Day 2014

=== As sideman or guest ===
- Sam Most: Bebop Revisited, Vol. 3 (Xanadu, 1953)
- Buddy Banks Quartet: Jazz in Paris – Buddy Banks/Bobby Jaspar – Jazz de Chambre (EmArcy, 1956)
- Sam Most: Sam Most Plays Bird, Bud, Monk and Miles (Bethlehem, 1957)
- Various Artists: Jazz Canto Vol. 1 (an anthology of poetry and jazz) (World Pacific Records, 1958)
- Miles Davis: Facets (Columbia,1967)
- Miles Davis: Sorcerer (Columbia, 1967)
- Allen Ginsberg: Songs of Innocence and Experience (MGM, 1970)
- Various: That's The Way I Feel Now: A Tribute to Thelonious Monk (A&M, 1984)
- Harold Danko: Alone But Not Forgotten (Sunnyside, 1985/86)
- Naked City: Grand Guignol (Avant, 1992)
- The Jazz Passengers: Jazz Passengers in Love (Windham Hill JAzz, 1994)
- Michael Hornstein: Innocent Gem (Enja, 1995)
- Hoagy's Children, Vol. 1 (Audiophile, 1994)
- Hoagy's Children, Vol. 2 (Audiophile, 1994)
- Various: Jazzmass (COTA, 1995)
- Blossom Dearie: I'm Hip (Columbia, 1998)
- Various: The Reasons for Christmas Project (PATH, 2003)
- Nellie McKay: Obligatory Villagers (Vanguard, 2007)
- Nellie McKay: Normal as Blueberry Pie: A Tribute to Doris Day (Verve Records, 2009)
