= Cherry Hill, Arkansas =

Cherry Hill may refer to several places in the U.S. state of Arkansas.

- Cherry Hill, Perry County, Arkansas, an unincorporated community
- Cherry Hill, Polk County, Arkansas, an unincorporated community
