= Secret Love (Doris Day song) =

1953 song

Single by Doris Day

from the album Calamity Jane
- B-side: "The Deadwood Stage"
- Released: October 9, 1953
- Recorded: August 5, 1953
- Studio: Warner Bros. Studios, Burbank
- Genre: Traditional pop
- Length: 3:41
- Label: Columbia
- Songwriters: Sammy Fain, Paul Francis Webster

Doris Day singles chronology
"Choo Choo Train (Ch-Ch-Foo)" (1953)	"Secret Love" (1953)	"I Speak to the Stars" (1954)

"Secret Love" is a song composed by Sammy Fain (music) and Paul Francis Webster (lyrics) for Calamity Jane, a 1953 musical film in which it was introduced by Doris Day in the title role. Ranked as a number 1 hit for Day on both the Billboard and Cash Box, the song also afforded Day a number 1 hit in the UK. "Secret Love" has subsequently been recorded by a wide range of artists, becoming a C&W hit firstly for Slim Whitman and later for Freddy Fender, with the song also becoming an R&B hit for Billy Stewart, whose version also reached the top 40 as did Freddy Fender's. In the UK, "Secret Love" would become the career record of Kathy Kirby via her 1963 remake of the song. The melody bears a slight resemblance to the opening theme of Schubert's A-major piano sonata, D.664.

== Doris Day version ==
Doris Day first heard "Secret Love" when its co-writer Sammy Fain visited the singer's home and played it for her, Day being so moved by the song that she'd recall her reaction as being: "I just about fell apart".

Day recorded the song on 5 August 1953 in a session at the Warner Bros. Recording Studio (Burbank), overseen by Warner Bros. musical director Ray Heindorf. On the day of the recording session for "Secret Love", Day had done vocal exercises at her home. Then about noon—the session being scheduled for 1 p.m.—she had set out on her bicycle to the studio. Heindorf had rehearsed the studio orchestra prior to Day's reaching the studio; upon her arrival, Heindorf suggested that Day do a practice run-through with the orchestra prior to recording any takes, but acquiesced to Day's request that her first performance with the orchestra be recorded. Day recalls, "When I got there I sang the song with the orchestra for the first time ... That was the first and only take we did." ... "When I finished Ray called me into the sound booth grinning from ear to ear and said, 'That's it. You're never going to do it better.'"

The single of "Secret Love" was released on 9 October 1953—three weeks prior to the premiere of the Calamity Jane film—by her longtime record label, Columbia Records in both 45 and 78 rpm format (cat. no.40108). The single entered the Top 20 bestselling singles survey at number 17 on Billboard magazine dated 9 January 1954 with the single reaching number 1 on the Top 20 survey for the week ending 17 February 1954, the week in which the song's Academy Award nomination for Best Song had been announced, the nominations for the 26th Academy Awards for the film year 1953 having been announced two days earlier. Day's "Secret Love", having spent three weeks ranked as the number 1 bestselling single by Billboard, was still ranked as the number 4 bestseller the week of the 26th Academy Awards broadcast which occurred 25 March 1954. However, Day declined to perform the nominated (and ultimately victorious) "Secret Love" at the Academy Awards ceremony, later stating: "When they asked me to sing 'Secret Love' on Academy Awards night I told them I couldn't—not in front of those people". Instead, Ann Blyth performed the song at the ceremony. Day's refusal to perform "Secret Love" on the Academy Awards broadcast resulted in the Hollywood Women's Press Club "honoring" Day with the Sour Apple Award as the most uncooperative celebrity of 1953: this put-down occasioned a bout of depression which kept Day virtually housebound for several weeks, and which Day eventually had to qualify her Christian Science outlook to deal with, consulting with a medical practitioner.

Cash Box reported in January 1954 that Day’s original recording “was losing a great deal of [radio] play because it ran something like 3:40 minutes. Realizing this, the diskery has just released a shortened version of the number in the hope that some of the play that had been lost could be regained.”

In 1999, the 1953 recording of "Secret Love" by Doris Day on Columbia Records was inducted into the Grammy Hall of Fame.

== 1953/54 cover versions ==
"Secret Love"

Single by Slim Whitman

from the album Favorites
- B-side: "Why"
- Released: December 1953
- Recorded: 4 December 1953
- Genre: C&W
- Length: 2:25
- Label: Imperial
- Songwriters: Sammy Fain, Paul Francis Webster

Slim Whitman singles chronology
"Lord Help Me Be as Thou" (1953)	"Secret Love" (1953)	"Rose Marie" (1954)

At the time of the release of the Doris Day version of "Secret Love" two vocal cover versions were issued, one of which - by Gogi Grant with the Harry Geller orchestra - is said to have been recorded at RCA Victor's LA recording studio in July 1953 which would make its recording earlier than Day's: the other vocal cover was recorded for MGM by Tommy Edwards with the LeRoy Holmes orchestra. Bing Crosby also had a single release of "Secret Love", recorded for Decca in Los Angeles in a 31 December 1953 session with the John Scott Trotter Orchestra and it was included in his album Bing Sings the Hits (1954).

On 4 December 1953 Slim Whitman made a recording of "Secret Love" in Baltimore MD: Whitman's version reached number 2 on the C&W chart in Billboard magazine in the spring of 1954 concurrent with the Doris Day version being number 1 on the magazine's Pop chart.

Both the Moonglows and the Orioles covered "Secret Love" for the r&b market, the Moonglows' track being recorded in Chicago 10 January 1954 while the Orioles' track was recorded in New York City 29 January 1954.

== Kathy Kirby version ==
"Secret Love"

Single by Kathy Kirby
- B-side: "You Have to Want to Touch Him"
- Released: October 1963
- Genre: Beat
- Length: 2:25
- Label: Decca
- Songwriters: Sammy Fain, Paul Francis Webster
- Producer: Peter Sullivan

Kathy Kirby singles chronology
"Dance On" (1963)	"Secret Love" (1963)	"Let Me Go, Lover" (1964)

In 1963, Kathy Kirby remade "Secret Love", released as a single in October 1963. The track, with musical direction by Charles Blackwell, Jimmy Page on guitar, and production by Kirby's regular collaborator Peter Sullivan, afforded Kirby her UK career record with a number 4 UK chart peak that December. "Secret Love" was also a hit in Australia reaching number 2.

Kirby recalled: "[when] 'Secret Love'...was suggested by my recording manager Peter Sullivan[,] I said 'But that's already been done beautifully by Doris Day!' Peter came up with a completely different version, up-tempo and starting with the middle eight. We took a chance on it and decided that if it didn't chart it would at least be a prestige number, so we were thrilled when it sold over half a million copies in three weeks".

"Secret Love" provided the title for a jukebox musical depicting Kirby's life story, which following its debut run at the Leeds City Varieties commencing 9 May 2008 played venues throughout the UK into 2009.

Chart (1963)	Peak position	Chart (1963)	Peak position
UK Singles Chart	4	New Zealand Singles Chart	4
Danish Singles Chart	4	Australian Singles Chart	3
Hong Kong Singles Chart	3	Irish Singles Chart	7

== Freddy Fender version ==
"Secret Love"

Single by Freddy Fender

from the album Are You Ready For Freddy?
- B-side: "Loving Cajun Style"
- Released: October 1975
- Studio: SugarHill (Houston, Texas)
- Genre: Country
- Length: 3:35
- Label: Dot
- Songwriters: Sammy Fain, Paul Francis Webster
- Producer: Huey P. Meaux

Freddy Fender singles chronology
"Since I Met You Baby" (1975)	"Secret Love" (1975)	"The Wild Side of Life" (1976)

Freddy Fender remade "Secret Love" for his 1975 album release Are You Ready For Freddy? recorded in the summer of 1975 at the SugarHill Recording Studios in Houston, Texas: issued as a single in October 1975 "Secret Love" afforded Fender the third of his four number 1 hits on the Billboard C&W, also crossing-over to the U.S. Top 40 of Billboard Hot 100, reaching number 20. (Fender would score one subsequent Top 40 hit, his fourth C&W number 1 hit "You'll Lose a Good Thing" crossing-over to the number 32 on the Hot 100.) Fender remade "Secret Love" for his 2002 album, 'La Musica de Baldemar Huerta.

Chart (1975–1976)	Peak position
Canada (RPM Country)	1
Canada (RPM Top 100)	38
Canada (RPM AC)	7
New Zealand (RIANZ)	10
U.S. Billboard Hot Country Singles	1
U.S. Billboard Hot 100	20
U.S. Billboard Adult Contemporary	10

== Other versions ==
"Secret Love"

Single by Billy Stewart

from the album Billy Stewart Teaches Old Standards New Tricks
- B-side: "Look Back & Smile"
- Released: September 1966
- Genre: R&B
- Length: 2:55
- Label: Chess
- Songwriters: Sammy Fain, Paul Francis Webster
- Producers: Billy Davis, Leonard Caston

Billy Stewart singles chronology
"Summertime" (1966)	"Secret Love" (1966)	"Every Day I Have the Blues" (1967)

- Spike Jones recorded a novelty version of the song (1955)
- John Serry Sr. arranged and recorded the song with his ensemble for his 1956 album Squeeze Play, on Dot Records (DLP-3024), and on Chicago Musette - John Serry et son Accordén, on Versailles Records (90 M 178) in 1958.
- Count Basie – Dance Along with Basie (1959)
- Frank Sinatra - Sinatra Sings Days of Wine and Roses, Moon River, and Other Academy Award Winners (1964)
- Billy Stewart – Look Back and Smile (1966)
- Art Blakey with Keith Jarrett – Buttercorn Lady (1966)
- Al Cohn – Rifftide (1987)
- Billy Eckstine – Once More with Feeling (1960)
- Dexter Gordon with Hampton Hawes – Blues a la Suisse (1973)
- Jim Hall – Jim Hall Live In Tokyo (1976)
- Ahmad Jamal – Ahmad's Blues (1958)
- Vincent Herring – Secret Love (1992)
- José Hoebee (former member of the girl band Luv') released an upbeat cover of the song for her 1982 album The Good Times. The single reached No. 3 in Flanders, No. 11 on the Dutch Top 40, and No. 14 on the Dutch Nationale Hitparade.
- Charlie Mariano, Sadao Watanabe – Charlie Mariano & Sadao Watanabe (1967)
- Anne Murray recorded a version of the song for her album Croonin' (1993)
- Brad Mehldau – Progression: Art of the Trio, Vol. 5 (2000)
- Sinéad O'Connor – Am I Not Your Girl? (1992)
- Oscar Peterson – The Trio (1973)
- Dinah Washington – Tears and Laughter (1961)
- Viola Wills - If You Could Read My Mind (1980)
- Connie Francis recorded "Secret Love" in a 27 April 1962 session at RCA Italiana Studios in Rome for her album Connie Francis sings Award Winning Motion Picture Hits. The original version from April 1962, with an arrangement by Geoff Love, was only available in Australia and New Zealand, on MGM Records. All other worldwide releases of the album included a version with a new orchestration recorded in April 1963, arranged by Don Costa.
- Classical guitarist Kaori Muraji recorded an instrumental version on her album Portrait.
- George Wright - Red Hot and Blue. (1984)
- George Michael - Songs from the Last Century (1999)
- Caterina Valente recorded the song in an upbeat version (1959)
- Pianist David Benoit - Waiting For Spring (1987)
- Mandy Moore - The Best of Mandy Moore (2004)
- k.d. lang recorded the song for the closing credits of the film The Celluloid Closet (1996)
- Sean Flynn recorded a version of the song in 1961 for Hi-Fidelity R.V. Records as part of a brief singing career. It was released on a 45 rpm and is considered a collectors piece.

"Secret Love" has been performed in various stage productions of the stage musical version of Calamity Jane in the US by Edie Adams, Martha Raye, Carol Burnett (who also sang the song in a 12 November 1963 televised broadcast of the Calamity Jane stage musical), Ginger Rogers, and Louise Mandrell; in the UK by Barbara Windsor, Louise Gold, Gemma Craven, Toyah Willcox, and Jodie Prenger; and in Australia by Rowena Wallace. Craven, who played the title role in an extensive touring production of Calamity Jane in 1995 and 1996, can be heard singing "Secret Love" on a 1995 cast album of Calamity Jane (Craven is the sole vocalist on the album). Willcox, who played the title role of Calamity Jane in the West End production of the stage musical in the summer of 2003, said of "Secret Love": "It's a great song to sing; it's very powerful, and emotionally—and musically—it's the pinnacle of the whole show."

In the Billy Paul version of "Me and Mrs. Jones" (1972), a saxophone is heard playing the first seven notes of "Secret Love", in the intro and outro of the song. That led to a lawsuit by Fain and Webster, claiming the melody was used without approval. It was settled out of court, with Fain and Webster each receiving half of the proceeds for the Billy Paul version of the song.

Loretta Lynn covered a version of the song on both the 1967 release Singin' With Feelin' and again on her 2016 album Full Circle.
