= Calamity Jane (soundtrack) =

Soundtrack album by Doris Day, Howard Keel
- Released: November 9, 1953
- Label: Columbia

Doris Day chronology
By the Light of the Silvery Moon (1953)	Calamity Jane (1953)	Young at Heart (1954)

Calamity Jane was the name of a 10" LP album, released by Columbia Records (as catalog number CL-6273) on November 9, 1953, of songs sung by Doris Day and Howard Keel from the movie of the same name. In the UK, the album was also released as a 10" minigroove album by Philips Records, catalogue number BBR8104.

One of the tracks on this album, "Secret Love," written by Sammy Fain and Paul Francis Webster, won the 1953 Academy Award for Best Original Song. It became a major hit, reaching #1 for four weeks and staying on the charts for 22 weeks. The album itself reached #2 on the Billboard magazine album charts.

The album was combined with Day's 1951 album, I'll See You in My Dreams, on a compact disc, issued on June 12, 2001, by Collectables Records.

== Track listing ==
All songs with lyrics by Paul Francis Webster and music by Sammy Fain; all songs are solos by Doris Day except where otherwise noted.

No.	Title	Length
1.	"The Deadwood Stage (Whip-Crack-Away!)"	3:15
2.	"I Can Do Without You" (duet with Howard Keel)	1:45
3.	"The Black Hills of Dakota"	3:01
4.	"Just Blew in from the Windy City"	2:10
5.	"A Woman's Touch"	2:30
6.	"Higher Than a Hawk (Deeper Than a Well)" (Howard Keel solo)	2:13
7.	"'Tis Harry I'm Plannin' to Marry"	2:07
8.	"Secret Love"	3:41

Although all songs were performed in the movie, only "The Deadwood Stage", "I Can Do Without You", "Higher Than A Hawk", and "Secret Love" were directly recorded from the movie soundtrack; all others were especially recorded for the album.
