= Big Fork Creek =

Stream in Polk County, Arkansas, U.S.

Big Fork Creek is a stream in eastern Polk County, Arkansas. It is a tributary of the Ouachita River. The stream headwaters arise at 34°26′57.39″N 94°01′31.72″W on the north slope of Missouri Mountains ridge in the Ouachita National Forest. The stream flows east then turns north and crosses under Arkansas Route 8 near Abernathy Springs. It flows generally north passing Big Fork and Opal to its confluence with the Ouachita River one mile south of the community of Cherry Hill.
