= Jingle Bell Jazz =

- 1962 release cover

Compilation album by various artists
- Released: October 17, 1962
- Recorded: 1959–1962
- Genre: Jazz, Christmas
- Length: 37:46
- Label: Columbia
- Producer: Teo Macero (most tracks); Frank Driggs ("Rockin' Around the Christmas Tree"); Irving Townsend ("We Three Kings of Orient Are")

Jingle Bell Jazz (re-issued as Christmas Jazz) is a collection of jazz versions of Christmas songs recorded between 1959 and 1962 by some of the most popular artists on the Columbia label. It was released on October 17, 1962.

== Recording and releases ==
Most tracks were recorded by Teo Macero in New York City across 1962. The only completely original tune is "Blue Xmas (To Whom It May Concern)", written by Miles Davis and Bob Dorough. Davis called up Dorough in 1962 and asked him to write the song and sing on it, even though the two had never recorded together.

The album was reissued twice on LP, in 1973 and 1980, with a track alteration and different cover art. Columbia has issued a CD called Jingle Bell Jazz with several tracks from the original LP and several newer tracks, with different cover art from both LP versions.

In 1985, Columbia repurposed the name of this compilation and took some tracks from its original release as well as some tracks from the 1981 compilation God Rest Ye Merry, Jazzmen.

== Reception ==
At the time of its release, Jingle Bell Jazz was reviewed in Billboard: "Unfortunately, this album is reaching the market too late to really be a factor this year, but it contains such a swinging, bright collection of jazz names, it certainly bears comment." The re-released compilation including tracks from God Rest Ye Merry, Jazzmen was reviewed by AllMusic Guide, whose editors scored the album three out of five stars, with reviewer Scott Yanow noting how there are multitudinous such samplers, with this one having several highlights. (Yanow also reviewed the 1981 compilation, which AllMusic Guide gave three stars, calling it "interesting if not overly essential music".)

Despite his unenthusiastic assessment of his contribution to Jingle Bell Jazz, Miles Davis recalled the recording session as the beginning of a fruitful collaboration with saxophonist Wayne Shorter: "Columbia got the bright idea of making an album for Christmas, and they thought it would be hip if I had this silly singer named Bob Dorough on the album, with Gil arranging. We got Wayne Shorter on tenor, Frank Rehak on trombone, and Willie Bobo on bongos, and in August we did this album. The less said about it the better, but it did let me play with Wayne Shorter for the first time, and I really liked what he was into."

Jingle Bell Jazz reached No. 28 on the Billboard Christmas Albums Chart on December 10, 1988.

== Track listing ==
Side One

1. "Jingle Bells" (James Lord Pierpont, arranged by Mercer Ellington) by Duke Ellington and His Orchestra – 3:00
2. "White Christmas" (Irving Berlin) by Lionel Hampton – 2:31
3. "Winter Wonderland" (Felix Bernard and Richard Bernhard Smith) by Chico Hamilton – 5:23
4. "The Christmas Song (Chestnuts Roasting on an Open Fire)" (Mel Tormé and Robert Wells) by Carmen McRae – 3:54
5. "Rudolph the Red-Nosed Reindeer" (Johnny Marks) by Pony Poindexter – 2:31
6. "We Three Kings of Orient Are" (traditional tune, lyrics by John Henry Hopkins Jr.) by Paul Horn – 3:50

Side Two

1. "Santa Claus Is Comin' to Town" (J. Fred Coots and Haven Gillespie) by Dave Brubeck – 3:40
2. "Deck Us All with Boston Charlie" (Norman Monath and Walt Kelly, based on "Deck the Halls", a traditional tune with lyrics by Thomas Oliphant) by Lambert, Hendricks & Ross – 3:12
3. "Frosty the Snowman" (Steve Nelson and Walter Rollins) by Dukes of Dixieland – 1:43
4. "If I Were a Bell" (Frank Loesser) by Manhattan Jazz All–Stars – 2:54
5. "Rockin' Around the Christmas Tree" (Johnny Marks) by Marlowe Morris – 2:25
6. "Blue Xmas (To Whom It May Concern)" (Miles Davis and Bob Dorough) by Miles Davis – 2:40

The 1973 Harmony re-release removes "Rudolph the Red-Nose Reindeer", slightly shuffles the tracks, and adds "Deck the Halls" by Herbie Hancock (duration: 4:59), recorded in 1969. The 1980 Columbia reissue restores "Rudolph", but removes "Frosty the Snowman", replacing it with "Deck the Halls". Digital editions of the compilation include all thirteen tracks, with "Deck the Halls" rounding out the compilation.

== Personnel ==
Credits and recording information are adapted from the 1980 Columbia Records Jazz Odyssey Series release (catalogue number PC 36803).

"Jingle Bells" (recorded in New York City, June 28, 1962)

- Cat Anderson – trumpet
- Aaron Bell – double bass
- Bill Berry – trumpet
- Lawrence Brown – trombone
- Roy Burrows – trumpet
- Harry Carney – reeds
- Chuck Connors – trombone
- Paul Gonsalves – reeds
- Jimmy Hamilton – reeds
- Johnny Hodges – reeds
- Ray Nance – trumpet
- Russell Procope – reeds
- Billy Strayhorn – piano
- Britt Woodman – trombone
- Sam Woodyard – drums

"White Christmas" (recorded in New York City, January 11, 1962)

- Eddie Bert – trombone
- Robert Byrne – trombone
- George Duvivier – double bass
- Tommy Flanagan – piano
- Lionel Hampton – vibraphone
- Richard Hixson – trombone
- Osie Johnson – drums
- Teo Macero – arrangement
- Billy Mackel – guitar
- Lou McGarity – trombone

"Winter Wonderland" (recorded in New York City, May 26, 1961)

- Buddy Catlett – double bass
- Nat Gershman – cello
- Chico Hamilton – drums
- Charles Lloyd – saxophone
- Harry W. Polk – guitar

"The Christmas Song (Chestnuts Roasting on an Open Fire)" (recorded in New York City, June 29, 1962)

- Bob Cranshaw – double bass
- Carmen McRae – vocals
- Norman Simmons – celesta

"Rudolph the Red-Nosed Reindeer" (recorded in New York City, May 23, 1962)

- Pepper Adams – baritone saxophone
- Dexter Gordon – tenor saxophone
- Gildo Mahones – piano
- Billy Mitchell – tenor saxophone
- Gene Quill – alto saxophone
- Charlie Persip – drums
- Pony Poindexter – alto saxophone, soprano saxophone
- Phil Woods – alto saxophone
- Bill Yancy – double bass

"We Three Kings of Orient Are" (recorded in Hollywood, August 15, 1962)

- Victor Gaskin – double bass
- Paul Horn – flute, arrangement
- Paul Moer – piano
- Emil Richards – vibraphone
- Milt Turner – drums

"Santa Claus Is Comin' to Town" (recorded in New York City, June 2, 1962)

- Dave Brubeck – piano
- Paul Desmond – alto saxophone
- Joe Morello – drums
- Eugene Wright – double bass

"Deck Us All with Boston Charlie" (recorded in New York City, May 4, 1962)

- Jon Hendricks – vocals
- Ike Isaacs – double bass
- Dave Lambert – vocals
- Gildo Mahones – piano
- Annie Ross – vocals
- Jimmy Wormworth – drums

"Frosty the Snowman" (recorded October 17, 1962)

The 1962 release does not feature liner notes of a listing of recording sessions like the subsequent re-issues. The back cover features a picture of the band, showing eight members of the Dukes of Dixieland, which may have included members such as:

- Frank Assunto
- Fred Assunto
- Papa Jac Assunto
- Buzzy Drootin
- Jack Maheu
- Barney Mallon
- Stanley Mendelsohn
- Tommy Rundell
- Gene Schroeder

"If I Were a Bell" (recorded in New York City, October 19, 1959)

- Teddy Charles – vibraphone
- Addison Farmer – trumpet
- Teo Macero – saxophone
- Dave McKenna – piano
- Jimmy Raney – guitar
- Ed Shaughnessy – drums
- Nick Travis – trumpet

"Rockin' Around the Christmas Tree" (recorded in New York City, August 16, 1962)

- Ray Barretto – drums
- Jo Jones – drums
- Marlowe Morris – organ

"Blue Xmas (To Whom It May Concern)" (recorded in New York City, August 25, 1962)

- Paul Chambers – double bass
- Jimmy Cobb – drums
- William Correa – bongos, congas
- Miles Davis – trumpet
- Bob Dorough – vocals
- Frank Rehak – trombone
- Wayne Shorter – saxophone

"Deck the Halls" (recorded in New York City, January 14, 1969)

- Al Caiola – guitar
- Dave Carey – vibraphone
- Jay Cee – arrangement
- Jimmy Cleveland – trombone
- Chick Corea – piano
- George Duvivier – double bass
- Herbie Hancock – piano
- Ed Shaughnessy – drums
- Woody Shaw – trumpet
- Frank Wess – saxophone

Technical personnel

- John Berg – design (1980 re-release)
- Harold Chapman – engineering
- Frank Driggs – production on "Rockin' Around the Christmas Tree"
- Harry Fein – remastering (1980 re-release)
- Mort Goode – production
- Arthur Kendy – engineering (1980 re-release)
- Frank Laico – engineering
- Teo Macero – production on all tracks other than "We Three Kings of Orient Are" and "Rockin' Around the Christmas Tree"
- Ken Robbins – artwork (1980 re-release)
- Irving Townsend – production on "We Three Kings of Orient Are"
- Murray Zimney – engineering
