= The Black Hills of Dakota (song) =

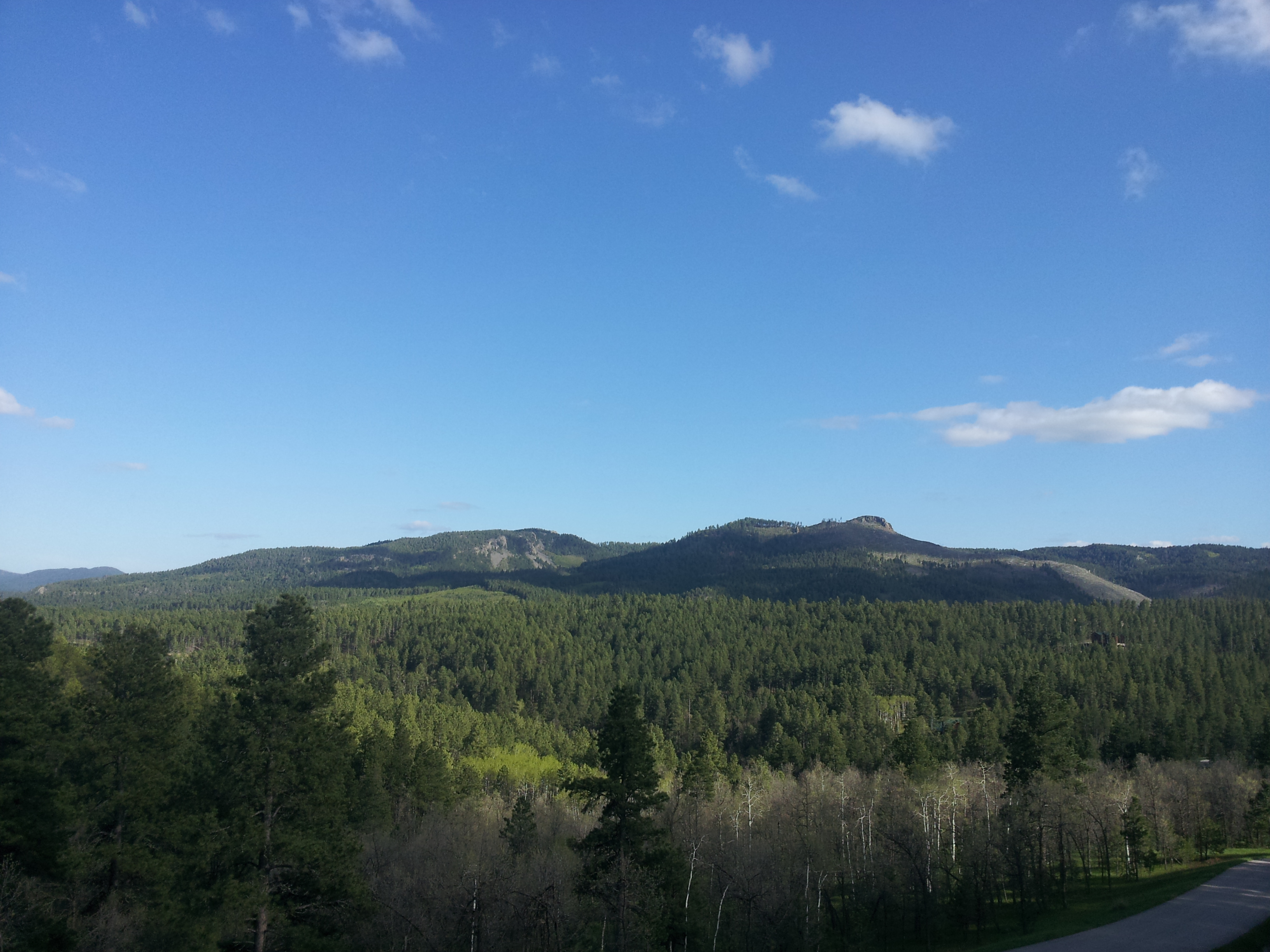
- The Black Hills outside of Deadwood, South Dakota; the inspiration for the song

Single by Doris Day

from the album Calamity Jane
- Released: June 1954
- Genre: Popular
- Length: 3:00
- Label: Columbia
- Composer: Sammy Fain
- Lyricist: Paul Francis Webster

"The Black Hills of Dakota" is a song written by Sammy Fain (music) and Paul Francis Webster (lyrics) for the 1953 musical film Calamity Jane. The song describes a love for the Black Hills region of South Dakota held by the film's fictionalized version of Calamity Jane.

The most notable recording of the song was by Doris Day, who played Calamity Jane in the film. This version was issued both on the soundtrack album of the film and as a single, which was released in June 1954. Day's recording reached No. 7 on the UK chart.

== Other versions ==
Nellie McKay recorded the song for her 2006 album Normal as Blueberry Pie – A Tribute to Doris Day. In 2010 Australian singer Melinda Schneider recorded the song for her Doris Day tribute album Melinda Does Doris.
