= Home Sweet Mobile Home =

Studio album by Nellie McKay
- Released: September 28, 2010
- Genre: Jazz
- Length: 51:18
- Label: Verve Records
- Producer: Nellie McKay, Robin Pappas

Nellie McKay chronology
Normal as Blueberry Pie – A Tribute to Doris Day (2009)	Home Sweet Mobile Home (2010)	My Weekly Reader (2015)

Professional ratings
Review scores
Source	Rating
Allmusic	link

Home Sweet Mobile Home is the fifth studio album by American singer-songwriter Nellie McKay, released on September 28, 2010, by Verve Records.

== Track listing ==
No.	Title	Length
1.	"Bruise on the Sky"	4:27
2.	"Adios"	2:13
3.	"Caribbean Time"	4:18
4.	"Please"	3:10
5.	"Beneath the Underdog"	4:59
6.	"Dispossessed"	3:53
7.	"The Portal"	3:53
8.	"¡Bodega!"	3:37
9.	"Coosada Blues"	4:32
10.	"No Equality"	4:35
11.	"Absolute Elsewhere"	3:50
12.	"Unknown Reggae"	4:31
13.	"Bluebird"	3:10

iTunes bonus track
No.	Title	Length
14.	"Caribbean Light"	4:20

== Charts ==
Chart (2010)	Peak position
Billboard Top Heatseekers	17
