= Big Fork, Arkansas =

- Unincorporated community
- Big Forks's position in Arkansas. Big Fork, Arkansas (the United States)
- Coordinates: 34°29′11″N 93°58′12″W
- Country: United States
- State: Arkansas
- County: Polk
- Elevation: 1,020 ft (310 m)
- Time zone: UTC-6 (Central (CST))
  - Summer (DST): UTC-5 (CDT)
- GNIS feature ID: 76338

Big Fork (also Bigfork) is an unincorporated community in eastern Polk County, Arkansas, United States. The community is approximately 17 miles southeast of Mena on Arkansas Route 8. Big Fork Creek flows past the east side of the community. The community of Abernathy Springs lies 1.5 miles to the southeast on Route 8.
