= Obligatory Villagers =

Studio album by Nellie McKay
- Released: September 25, 2007
- Recorded: 2007
- Genre: Jazz, pop, rock
- Length: 31:35; 33:38 (with online bonus track)
- Label: Hungry Mouse/Vanguard Records
- Producer: Nellie McKay

Nellie McKay chronology
Pretty Little Head (2006)	Obligatory Villagers (2007)	Normal as Blueberry Pie – A Tribute to Doris Day (2009)

Obligatory Villagers is the third studio album by American singer-songwriter Nellie McKay. It was released on September 25, 2007. Bob Dorough appears as a guest vocalist on several tracks. Many of the musicians on the album reside in the Pocono Mountains, particularly the Delaware Water Gap area. Nancy Reed, a voice teacher in Stroudsburg, sings with her on "Politan." Nellie McKay was Nancy Reed's first student.

== Track listing ==
No.	Title	Length
1.	"Mother of Pearl"
2.	"Oversure"
3.	"Gin Rummy"
4.	"Livin"
5.	"Identity Theft"
6.	"Galleon"
7.	"Politan"
8.	"Testify"
9.	"Zombie"
10.	"Doko Demo Doa" (Bonus Track in Japanese)

== Critical reception ==
Professional ratings
Review scores
Source	Rating
AllMusic	4/5 stars
Robert Christgau	(A−)
Pitchfork Media	(6.9/10)
Rolling Stone	3.5/5 stars

Critical response to the album was generally positive. Pitchfork Media and AllMusic both commented that the album was "difficult to understand," though they also agreed that McKay is a talented songwriter and arranger.

Robert Christgau gave the album 3.5/5 stars.

== Charts ==
Chart (2007)	Peak position
Billboard Heatseekers	30
