= Choo Choo Train (Ch-Ch-Foo) =

Single by Doris Day
- B-side: "This Too Shall Pass Away"
- Released: August 10, 1953
- Genre: Vocal
- Length: 2:25
- Label: Columbia; 40063
- Songwriter(s): Jack Lawrence, Marc Fontenoy

Doris Day singles chronology
"A Purple Cow" (June 15, 1953)	"Choo Choo Train (Ch-Ch-Foo)" (1953)	"Secret Love" (October 19, 1953)

"Choo Choo Train (Ch-Ch-Foo)" is a song written by Jack Lawrence and Marc Fontenoy and performed by Doris Day featuring Paul Weston and His Orchestra. In 1953, the track reached No. 20 on the U.S. chart.

== Other Versions ==
- Dinah Shore featuring the Vic Schoen Orchestra released a version of the song as a single in 1953.
