= 52e Rue Est =

French jazz record label

- Genre: Jazz
- Country of origin: France

52e Rue Est was a jazz record label in France during the 1970s and the 1980s that released a few jazz, soul, and blues albums. The label's roster included Chet Baker and Archie Shepp.

== Discography ==
Disc No.	Artist	Album	Year
001	Bob Dorough	Devil May Care II	1982
002	Jimmy Gourley	Jimmy Gourley and the Paris Heavyweights	1972
003	Jean-Loup Longnon Big Band	Torride	1984
004	Pip Pyle	L'Équipe Out	1986
005	Karim Abdul Alim	Dance	1983
006	Philippe Gaillot	Concept	1986
–	–	–	–
015	Archie Shepp and Horace Parlan	En concert: 1st set	1987
016	Archie Shepp and Horace Parlan	En concert: 2nd set	1987
017	Archie Shepp and Chris McGregor	En concert à Banlieues Bleues	1989
018	Archie Shepp and Michel Marre Quintet	Passion	1985
019	Chet Baker and Steve Houben	Chet Baker & Steve Houben	1980
020	Jimmy Gourley/Richard Galliano	Flyin' the Coop	1991
021	–	–	–
022	–	–	–
023	Screamin' Jay Hawkins	The Night and Day of Screamin' Jay Hawkins	1965
024	Orchestre de Jazz Languedoc-Roussillon	Dialogues	
025	Mamdouh Bahri	From Tunisia With Love	1991
026	–	–	–
027	Michel Bastet/Frédéric Folmer	Nostalgia n' Barbès	1992

Notes:

- 006 & 025 unconfirmed
- 018 is an expanded version of the LP Vent du Sud 105 (titled You're My Thrill)
- 023 is a reissue of Planet PLL-1001
