= Schoolhouse Rock! (soundtrack) =

1996 soundtrack album

Soundtrack album by Bob Dorough, et al.
- Released: June 18, 1996
- Recorded: 1972–1996
- Length: 146:35
- Label: Rhino Records

Professional ratings
Review scores
Source	Rating
Allmusic	4.5/5 stars

Schoolhouse Rock! The Box Set is a television soundtrack based on the animated television series Schoolhouse Rock!, released by Rhino Records on June 18, 1996, and contains 52 tracks. In 2018, the album was selected by the Library of Congress for preservation in the United States National Recording Registry for being "culturally, historically, or aesthetically significant".

== Track listing ==
=== Disc one (Multiplication Rock) ===
#	Song title	Performed by	Time	Composers	Year
1.	"Schoolhouse Rocky"	Bob Dorough and Friends	0:13	Bob Dorough, Tom Yohe	
2.	"Elementary, My Dear"	Bob Dorough	3:01	Bob Dorough	1973
3.	"Three is a Magic Number"	Bob Dorough	3:16	Bob Dorough	1973
4.	"The Four-Legged Zoo"	Bob Dorough and Friends	3:00	Bob Dorough	1973
5.	"Ready or Not, Here I Come"	Bob Dorough	3:01	Bob Dorough	1973
6.	"My Hero, Zero"	Bob Dorough	3:17	Bob Dorough	1973
7.	"I Got Six"	Grady Tate	3:08	Bob Dorough	1973
8.	"Lucky Seven Sampson"	Bob Dorough	3:00	Bob Dorough	1973
9.	"Figure Eight"	Blossom Dearie	3:03	Bob Dorough	1973
10.	"Naughty Number Nine"	Grady Tate	3:01	Bob Dorough	1973
11.	"The Good Eleven"	Bob Dorough	3:07	Bob Dorough	1973
12.	"Little Twelvetoes"	Bob Dorough	3:05	Bob Dorough	1973
13.	"My Hero, Zero" (bonus track)	The Lemonheads	3:04	Bob Dorough	1996

=== Disc two (Grammar Rock / Money Rock) ===
#	Song title	Performed by	Time	Composers	Year
1.	"Schoolhouse Rocky"	Bob Dorough and Friends	0:13	Bob Dorough, Tom Yohe	
2.	"Unpack Your Adjectives"	Blossom Dearie	3:00	George Newall	1974
3.	"Lolly, Lolly, Lolly, Get Your Adverbs Here"	Bob Dorough	3:01	Bob Dorough	1974
4.	"Conjunction Junction"	Jack Sheldon, Terri Morel, and Mary Sue Berry	2:59	Bob Dorough	1973
5.	"Interjections!"	Essra Mohawk	3:01	Lynn Ahrens	1974
6.	"Rufus Xavier Sarsaparilla"	Jack Sheldon	2:59	Bob Dorough, Kathy Mandary	1976
7.	"Verb: That's What's Happening"	Zachary Sanders	3:00	Bob Dorough	1974
8.	"A Noun is a Person, Place or Thing"	Lynn Ahrens	2:56	Lynn Ahrens	1973
9.	"Busy Prepositions"	Jack Sheldon and Bob Dorough	3:02	Bob Dorough	1993
10.	"The Tale of Mr. Morton"	Jack Sheldon	2:59	Lynn Ahrens	1993
11.	"Dollars and Sense"	Val Hawk and Bob Dorough	2:59	Dave Frishberg	1994
12.	"Tax Man Max"	Patrick Quinn	3:00	Stephen Flaherty, Lynn Ahrens	1995
13.	"$7.50 Once a Week"	Dave Frishberg	3:02	Dave Frishberg	1995
14.	"Where the Money Goes"	Jack Sheldon	3:02	Rich Mendoza	1995

=== Disc three (America Rock) ===
#	Song title	Performed by	Time	Composers	Year
1.	"Schoolhouse Rocky"	Bob Dorough and Friends	0:13	Bob Dorough, Tom Yohe	
2.	"No More Kings"	Lynn Ahrens & Bob Dorough	3:00	Lynn Ahrens	1975
3.	"Fireworks"	Grady Tate	2:57	Lynn Ahrens	1976
4.	"The Shot Heard 'Round the World"	Bob Dorough	3:02	Bob Dorough	1976
5.	"The Preamble"	Lynn Ahrens	2:59	Lynn Ahrens	1975
6.	"Elbow Room"	Sue Manchester	3:02	Lynn Ahrens	1976
7.	"The Great American Melting Pot"	Lori Lieberman	3:08	Lynn Ahrens	1976
8.	"Mother Necessity"	Bob Dorough, Jack Sheldon, Blossom Dearie, & Essra Mohawk	3:00	Bob Dorough	1976
9.	"Sufferin' Till Suffrage"	Essra Mohawk	3:00	Bob Dorough, Tom Yohe	1976
10.	"I'm Just a Bill"	Jack Sheldon	3:00	Dave Frishberg	1975
11.	"Three-Ring Government"	Lynn Ahrens	3:00	Lynn Ahrens	1979
12.	"Electricity, Electricity!" (bonus track)	Goodness	3:20	Bob Dorough	1996

=== Disc four (Science Rock / Computer Rock) ===
#	Song title	Performed by	Time	Composers	Year
1.	"Schoolhouse Rocky"	Bob Dorough and Friends	0:13	Bob Dorough, Tom Yohe	
2.	"The Body Machine"	Bob Dorough and Jack Sheldon	2:58	Lynn Ahrens	1979
3.	"Do the Circulation"	Joshie Armstead, Mary Sue Berry, & Maeretha Stewart	3:00	Lynn Ahrens	1979
4.	"Electricity, Electricity!"	Zachary Sanders	3:05	Bob Dorough	1979
5.	"The Energy Blues"	Jack Sheldon	2:59	George Newall	1979
6.	"Interplanet Janet"	Lynn Ahrens	3:00	Lynn Ahrens	1978
7.	"Telegraph Line"	Jaime Aff and Christine Langner	2:59	Lynn Ahrens	1979
8.	"Them Not-So-Dry Bones"	Jack Sheldon	3:06	George Newall	1979
9.	"A Victim of Gravity"	The Tokens	3:00	Lynn Ahrens	1978
10.	"Introduction"	Darrell Stern and Bob Kaliban	3:01	Lynn Ahrens, Tom Yohe and Bob Dorough	1982
11.	"Software"	Darrell Stern and Bob Kaliban	3:12	Dave Frishberg	1982
12.	"Hardware"	Darrell Stern and Bob Kaliban	3:01	Lynn Ahrens	1983
13.	"Number Cruncher"	Darrell Stern and Bob Kaliban	2:59	Dave Frishberg	1984
