= Calamity Jane (1953 film) =

1953 film

- Theatrical poster
- Directed by: David Butler
- Written by: James O'Hanlon
- Produced by: William Jacobs
- Starring: Doris Day; Howard Keel; Allyn Ann McLerie
- Cinematography: Wilfrid M. Cline
- Edited by: Irene Morra
- Music by: Ray Heindorf
- Distributed by: Warner Bros. Pictures
- Release date: November 4, 1953
- Running time: 101 minutes
- Country: United States
- Language: English

Calamity Jane is a 1953 American Technicolor Western musical film starring Doris Day and Howard Keel, and directed by David Butler. The musical numbers were staged and directed by Jack Donohue, who a year later would direct the film musical Lucky Me, also starring Doris Day. The film is loosely based on the life of Wild West heroine Calamity Jane (Doris Day) and explores an alleged romance between her and Wild Bill Hickok (Howard Keel).

Calamity Jane was devised by Warner Bros. Pictures in response to the success of the 1950 MGM film Annie Get Your Gun, and won the Academy Award for Best Original Song for "Secret Love" (Sammy Fain and Paul Francis Webster), and was also Oscar-nominated for Best Music, Scoring of a Musical Picture (Ray Heindorf) and Best Sound, Recording (William A. Mueller).

The songs and screenplay would form the basis of a 1961 stage musical of the same name that has had a number of productions.

== Plot ==
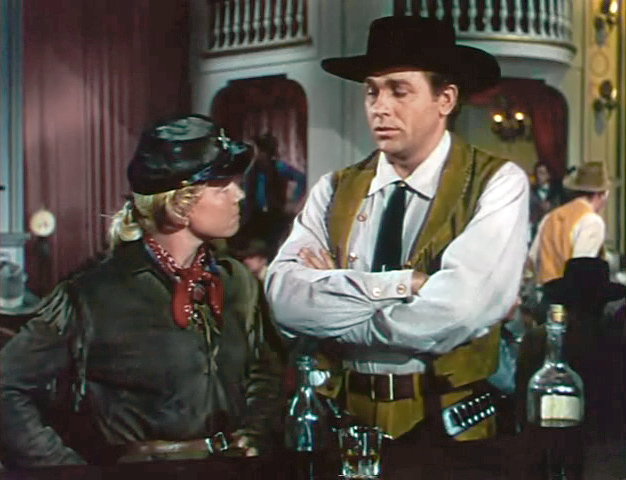
Calamity Jane (Doris Day) and Wild Bill Hickok (Howard Keel) at the Deadwood saloon

Dakota Territory, the 1870s. Tough-talking, hard-riding, straight-shooting Calamity Jane (Doris Day) has a crush on Second Lieutenant Gilmartin (Philip Carey). She even risks life and limb to single-handedly save him from an Indian war party. Meanwhile, Deadwood's saloon owner, who sends for beautiful women entertainers to appear on stage, mistakenly hires a male. Fearing a riot, the owner persuades the reluctant actor to perform in drag. Initially convincing, his wig falls off, and the angry audience threatens to tear the saloon down. Calamity calms the situation, vowing to go to Chicago and bring the renowned singer Adelaid Adams (Gale Robbins) back to Deadwood. However, her friend Wild Bill Hickok (Howard Keel) expresses doubt, scoffing at the idea.

Calamity arrives in Chicago, where Adams is giving her farewell performance before launching a European tour. After the show ends, Adelaid gives her old costumes to her maid, Katie Brown (Allyn McLerie), who dreams of becoming a singer. Later, when Calamity walks in, she mistakes Katie for Adelaid. Katie, posing as Adelaid Adams, agrees to go with Calamity, seeing it as a chance to perform on stage. But back in Deadwood, during Katie's premiere performance, stage fright gets the best of her. She bursts into tears, admitting she is not Adelaid Adams. As the stunned crowd are on the verge of rioting, Calamity fires a shot in the air and defends Katie. She is allowed to carry on, and her confidence wins them over.

Katie moves into Calamity's ramshackle cabin which they fix up together. To attract Lt. Gilmartin, Calamity, with Katie's help, dresses and behaves "ladylike". But Gilmartin and Hickok both admire Katie. At one point, they draw straws to see who will take her to the upcoming ball. Lt. Gilmartin wins, and Wild Bill agrees to complement the double date by escorting Calamity. At the ball, everyone is awed by Calamity's transformation. She's beautiful. But she becomes increasingly jealous watching Katie and Gilmartin together. The ball ends when Calamity angrily confronts Katie, shooting a punch glass from her hand. A day later, Katie challenges Calamity to hold her glass in the air, if she can shoot it out of her hand Katie stays. Unbeknownst to both of them Wild Bill shoots the glass from Calamity’s hand as he is in love with Katie. Calamity, feeling humiliated, exits with Wild Bill and they drive off in his wagon. A heartbroken Calamity reveals her crush on Gilmartin, while Bill admits his love for Katie. Yet the scene is resolved when Calamity and Bill passionately embrace and kiss; Calamity realizes she loved Bill all along.

The next day, Katie returns to Chicago, feeling guilty over betraying her best friend. A furious Lt. Gilmartin blames Calamity for Katie leaving. She responds by mounting her horse and riding out to overtake the stagecoach. There, she tells Katie she loves Bill, and the women are reunited. The story ends with a double wedding.

== Cast ==
- Doris Day as Calamity Jane
- Howard Keel as Wild Bill Hickok
- Allyn Ann McLerie as Katie Brown
- Philip Carey as Daniel Gilmartin
- Dick Wesson as Francis Fryer
- Paul Harvey as Henry Miller
- Chubby Johnson as Rattlesnake
- Gale Robbins as Adelaid Adams
- Tom London as Prospector (uncredited)

== Music ==
The score, with music by Sammy Fain and lyrics by Paul Francis Webster, includes:

- "The Deadwood Stage"
- "Hive Full of Honey"
- "I Can Do Without You"
- "'Tis Harry I'm Plannin' to Marry"
- "The Windy City"
- "Keep It Under Your Hat"
- "Higher Than a Hawk"
- "A Woman's Touch"
- "The Black Hills of Dakota"
- "Secret Love"

The music was included in the album of the same name, though some of the songs from the album were re-recorded rather than taken from the soundtrack.

== Reception ==
In its opening week in November 1953, the film finished ninth at the U.S. movie theatres box office receipts with grosses of $55,000 at the Paramount Theatre in Manhattan, New York City, $18,000 in Philadelphia, $12,000 in Cleveland and $7,500 in Minneapolis.

== Awards and honors ==
At the 26th Academy Awards, Calamity Jane won:

Best Original Song for “Secret Love”

It also was nominated for the following categories:

- Best Sound Recording
- Best Music (Scoring of a Motion Picture)

The film is recognized by American Film Institute in these lists:

- 2002: AFI's 100 Years...100 Passions – Nominated
- 2003: AFI's 100 Years...100 Heroes & Villains:
  - Calamity Jane – Nominated Hero
- 2004: AFI's 100 Years...100 Songs:
  - "Secret Love" – Nominated
- 2006: AFI's Greatest Movie Musicals – Nominated

== Subtext ==
The film has been popular with some lesbian audiences for its depiction of a character which can be read as lesbian, and was screened at the London Lesbian and Gay Film Festival in 2006, 53 years after its original production and release. Film critic Jamie Stuart points to the film's lesbian overtones in Jane being played as a strong, independent woman who shares a house with a woman, the two of them painting "Calam and Katie" on its door. Armond White sees the film as approaching sexuality in a way that Hollywood was not openly able to do, describing the empathy and envy (despite this resulting from conflict over a man) between Jane and Katie's characters as "a landmark display of girl-on-girl attraction."

Out magazine described the film's award-winning song, "Secret Love," as "the first gay anthem." In a 2011 interview with The Advocate, Day, then age 89 and long retired, was asked about the song being embraced by the gay community. She replied, "I was not aware of that, but that's wonderful."

== Accuracy ==
Though the film portrays Calamity Jane and "Wild Bill" Hickok as lovers, historians have found no proof that they were more than acquaintances. Jane claimed years after Hickok's 1876 shooting death that she had not only been his lover but also his wife and the mother of his child, but she offered no substantiation of her claims.

Many of Jane's contemporaries considered her a teller of tall tales (as portrayed in the film to humorous effect) who exaggerated her links to more famous frontier figures, and some insisted Hickok did not even particularly like her. But when she died 27 years later in 1903 at the relatively young age of 51, friends buried her beside him at her request; four of the men on the self-appointed committee who planned Calamity's funeral (Albert Malter, Frank Ankeney, Jim Carson, and Anson Higby) later stated that, since Hickok had "absolutely no use" for Jane in this life, they decided to play a posthumous joke on him by laying her, as she requested, to rest by his side.
