= I Can Do Without You =

Song by Doris Day and Howard Keel

from the album Calamity Jane
- Released: 1953
- Genre: Popular
- Composer: Sammy Fain
- Lyricist: Paul Francis Webster

"I Can Do Without You" is a popular song, with music by Sammy Fain and lyrics by Paul Francis Webster.

The song was included in the 1953 film, Calamity Jane. It was performed by Doris Day and Howard Keel. Doris Day played the lead in the film as Calamity Jane, while Howard Keel played her nemesis and eventual love interest, Bill Hickok.

The song proceeds from a scene in which Calamity is thrown off-kilter by apparent praise from Hickok after she promises to bring the actress Adelaid Adams from Chicago to Deadwood City. It turns out that Hickok was being sarcastic and that he trusts her "about as much as I do a blind rattlesnake with a new button on its tail." The song is a comical male-female quarrel, with Calamity and Hickok exchanging comic insults, somewhat reminiscent of "Anything You Can Do" from Annie Get Your Gun.
