= Pretty Little Head =

Studio album by Nellie McKay
- Released: October 31, 2006
- Recorded: 2005
- Genre: Pop; rock
- Label: Hungry Mouse, SpinArt Records, Rykodisc Records (2006-2007); Sony Records (2008-)
- Producer: Robin Pappas/Nellie McKay

Nellie McKay chronology
Get Away from Me (2004)	Pretty Little Head (2006)	Obligatory Villagers (2007)

Columbia's cover version

Professional ratings
Aggregate scores
Source	Rating
Metacritic	78/100
Review scores
Source	Rating
Allmusic	4/5 stars
Being There Magazine	3.5/5 stars
Pitchfork Media	7.4/10
Rolling Stone	4/5 stars
Spin	B+

Pretty Little Head is the second studio album by English–American singer Nellie McKay. It was released October 31, 2006, on Nellie's own Hungry Mouse label. It features duets with Cyndi Lauper ("Beecharmer") and k.d. lang ("We Had It Right"). Other songs include "Columbia Is Bleeding", "Cupcake" ("...about gay marriage..."), and "The Big One" ("...about a tenant's rights activist...").

Pretty Little Head was originally set to be released October 18, 2005. The release date was subsequently delayed until December 27, 2005 and finally January 3, 2006.

However, McKay announced on December 19, 2005, that she had left Columbia/Sony Records after a dispute over the length of the upcoming album. Just over two weeks following this announcement, a New York Times article surfaced stating McKay said she had been dropped by Columbia Records.

The album was being marketed and manufactured on the SpinArt Records label until the label's bankruptcy in 2007. Pretty Little Head is now being distributed by Sony in its original, 23-track 2-CD version, effectively bringing the album back to Columbia.

== Track listing ==
Columbia version
No.	Title	Length
1.	"Cupcake"	4:44
2.	"Pink Chandelier"	1:38
3.	"There You Are in Me"	2:46
4.	"The Big One"	4:02
5.	"G.E.S."	1:42
6.	"I Will Be There"	2:55
7.	"The Down Low"	3:36
8.	"Long & Lazy River"	3:47
9.	"Beecharmer" (featuring Cyndi Lauper)	4:02
10.	"Real Life"	2:49
11.	"I Am Nothing"	1:47
12.	"we had it right" (featuring k.d. lang)	2:20
13.	"Columbia Is Bleeding"	3:41
14.	"GLADD"	3:06
15.	"Happy Flower"	2:27
16.	"Tipperary"	2:56

spinArt/Hungry Mouse version Disc 1
No.	Title	Length
1.	"Cupcake"	4:44
2.	"Pink Chandelier"	1:38
3.	"There You Are in Me"	2:46
4.	"Yodel"	1:36
5.	"The Big One"	4:02
6.	"G.E.S."	1:42
7.	"I Will Be There"	2:55
8.	"The Down Low"	3:36
9.	"Long & Lazy River"	3:47
10.	"I Am Nothing"	1:47
11.	"Beecharmer" (featuring Cyndi Lauper)	4:02
12.	"Swept Away"	1:53

spinArt/Hungry Mouse version Disc 2
No.	Title	Length
1.	"Real Life"	2:49
2.	"Tipperary"	2:56
3.	"Gladd"	3:06
4.	"Food"	3:00
5.	"We Had It Right" (featuring k.d. lang)	2:20
6.	"Columbia Is Bleeding"	3:41
7.	"Lali Est Paresseux"	2:33
8.	"Happy Flower"	2:27
9.	"Mama & Me"	4:11
10.	"Pounce"	0:56
11.	"Old Enough"	1:45

== Charts ==
Chart (2006)	Peak position
US Heatseekers Albums (Billboard)	10
US Independent Albums (Billboard)	24
