= Get Away from Me =

Studio album by Nellie McKay
- Released: February 10, 2004
- Recorded: August 4–22, 2003
- Studios: Clinton, New York City
- Genres: Pop; rock; jazz; comedy
- Length: 61:31
- Label: Columbia
- Producer: Geoff Emerick

Nellie McKay chronology
Get Away from Me (2004)	Pretty Little Head (2006)

Singles from Get Away From Me
- 1. "David" Released: 2004

Get Away from Me is the debut studio album by American singer-songwriter Nellie McKay. The album was met with widespread praise from critics, and charted on the Billboard 200, selling over 100,000 copies in the United States by August 2005.

== Release ==
The album was released on February 10, 2004, by Columbia Records. McKay insisted on Columbia releasing this album as a two-disc set even though all of its content could fit on a single disc. On iTunes, a clean version was made available which removes the profanities found on some of the songs like "Sari."

A DualDisc version of the album was released on March 29, 2005, featuring a DVD side with a live concert, 5.1 audio, and two previously unreleased tracks, "John-John" and "Teresa." The CD side features both discs of the previous release as one continuous album.

"David," the album's opening track, was released as a promotional single, with an accompanying music video. The song was included on MTV2's "Shortlist 2004 Nominees" compilation and on the soundtrack for the TV series Weeds. McKay stated in an interview with ELLEgirl that the song was written about her neighbor, whom she has a crush on.

== Critical reception ==
Professional ratings
Aggregate scores
Source	Rating
Metacritic	79/100
Review scores
Source	Rating
AllMusic	4/5 stars
Blender	4/5 stars
Entertainment Weekly	A
The Guardian	5/5 stars
Los Angeles Times	3.5/4 stars
Pitchfork	6.3/10
Q	3/5 stars
Rolling Stone	4/5 stars
Spin	B
The Village Voice	A−

Get Away from Me was met with widespread praise from music critics. On the review aggregator Metacritic, the album holds a score of 79 out of 100, based on 17 reviews. Heather Phares, reviewing the album for AllMusic, gave the album 4 out of 5 stars, commenting that the album "is the kind of feverishly inventive, sprawling album that only comes from young artists," going on to praise the album's musical and lyrical eclecticism but feeling that the variety made the album sometimes feel "dizzying rather than dazzling." Phares concluded that the record "could become a cult favorite among pissed-off girl-women of McKay's age." In a rave review, The Guardian's Maddy Costa, who awarded the album 5 out of 5 stars, felt that "lyrically [...] her elegance and control are irrefutable" and singled out "I Wanna Get Married" and "Won't U Please B Nice" as highlights. Entertainment Weekly, whose review was also extremely positive, likened McKay to Julie London and praised her vocals and lyrics, giving the album an "A".

Some critics were less enthusiastic in their assessments of the album. Chris Dahlen, writing for Pitchfork, gave the album 6.3 out of 10, calling McKay "annoying" and her music "a mess of jazz, pop, and easy listening," but praising the record's "graceful melodies, barbed hooks, and confident voice" on songs such as "Ding Dong" and "The Suitcase Song." The Austin Chronicle's Matt Dentler was also more skeptical of the album, awarding the album 2 stars and criticizing some of McKay's lyrics, but feeling that McKay has "talent" and concluding that McKay will "only get better as she figures out who the real Nellie McKay is."

== Commercial performance ==
Get Away from Me debuted at number 16 on the Billboard Heatseekers album chart on the chart dated March 13, 2004. The following week, the album rose to its number 7 peak on the Heatseekers chart and debuted on the Billboard 200 at number 181. The album remains her highest-charting album in the US, her only other album to reach the Billboard 200 being her Doris Day tribute album, Normal As Blueberry Pie. As of August 2005, Get Away from Me had sold 102,000 copies in the United States, according to Billboard.

== Track listing ==
All songs written by Nellie McKay.

Disc 1
No.	Title	Length
1.	"David"	2:47
2.	"Manhattan Avenue"	3:38
3.	"Sari"	3:27
4.	"Ding Dong"	3:11
5.	"Baby Watch Your Back"	3:28
6.	"The Dog Song"	3:04
7.	"Waiter"	4:15
8.	"I Wanna Get Married"	4:01
9.	"Change the World"	3:58

Disc 2
No.	Title	Length
1.	"It's a Pose"	3:30
2.	"Toto Dies"	4:02
3.	"Won't U Please B Nice"	2:09
4.	"Inner Peace"	2:53
5.	"Suitcase Song"	2:33
6.	"Work Song"	4:08
7.	"Clonie"	1:56
8.	"Respectable"	4:07
9.	"Really"	3:56
Total length:		61:31

== Personnel ==
Adapted from the liner notes of Get Away from Me and AllMusic.

Instruments

- Jay Berliner – Spanish guitar
- Cenovia Cummins – violin, fiddle
- Patricia Davis – violin
- Joyce Hammann - violin
- Paul Holderbaum - orchestra director
- Jim Hynes - flugelhorn, trumpet
- Birch Johnson - trombone
- Billy Kaye - drums
- Richard Locker - cello
- Nellie McKay - chimes, glockenspiel, organ, percussion, piano, recorder, vibraphone, synthesizer, xylophone
- Emily Mitchell - harp
- Norman Panto - accordion
- Charles Pillow - flute, alto saxophone
- Carol Pool - violin
- Ari Roland - upright bass
- Rob Shaw - violin
- Andy Snitzer - clarinet, tenor saxophone
- Andy Stein - violin
- Corin Stiggall - electric bass
- Jade Synstelien - guitar
- Belinda Whitney-Barratt - concertmaster

Production

- Stuart Breed - assistant engineer
- Greg Calbi - mastering
- Geoff Emerick - engineer, producer
- Steve Genewick - assistant engineer
- Nellie McKay - associate producer
- Bill Airey Smith - assistant engineer

Miscellaneous

- Timothy Dark - rap consultant
- Phillip Stewart - rhythm consultant
- Elinda Whitney - contractor
- Amy T. Zielenski - photography

== Charts ==
Chart (2004)	Peak position
US Billboard 200	181
US Heatseekers Albums (Billboard)	7
UK Jazz & Blues Albums (Official Charts)	11
Dutch Albums (Album Top 100)	70
