= 'Tis Harry I'm Plannin' to Marry =

Song

from the album Calamity Jane
- Released: 1953
- Genre: Popular
- Composer(s): Sammy Fain
- Lyricist(s): Paul Francis Webster

"'Tis Harry I'm Plannin' to Marry" is a popular song, with music by Sammy Fain and lyrics by Paul Francis Webster.

The song was included in the hit musical Calamity Jane (1953). It is featured three times in the film. It is first sung by the character Adelaide Adams (Gale Robbins), then by Katie Brown (Allyn McLerie) after dressing up as Adelaide, and finally partly sung in the Golden Garter by Katie near the end of the film.
