= Mamdouh Bahri =

Tunisian-French jazz guitarist

- Born: Mamdouh Bahri; 31 July 1957 (age 68); Sfax, Tunisia
- Genres: Jazz, Afro-Mediterranean
- Occupations: Musician, Guitarist
- Instruments: Guitar
- Years active: 1980s–present
- Labels: 52e Rue Est, Aljazzira, Jazz Metiss D'Aujourd'hui
- Website: Official Website

Mamdouh Bahri (born 31 July 1957 at Sfax, Tunisia) is a Tunisian jazz guitarist who has combined Afro-Mediterranean music with a jazz tradition.

== Biography ==
Bahri grew up in Tunisia and at the age of 25 came to Montpellier, France, where he later taught music at Jazz Action Montpellier (JAM) until 1991.

From 1989 to 1993, he played in a quartet with pianist Horace Parlan, Italian bassist Riccardo Del Fra and New Orleans drummer Idris Muhammad. In 1991, they recorded the CD "From Tunisia with Love" live in Carthage. That year, Bahri moved to New York City, where he joined the collective Spirit of Life Ensemble with saxophonist T.K. Blue, trumpeter Ted Curson and drummer Winard Harper among others, recording seven albums with the group between 1993 and 2002.

Bahri has played in many concerts throughout France. He has also performed in northern Europe, the Middle East, China and in the United States. Bahri has appeared on broadcast television in Tunis and Abu Dhabi. His recordings have gotten radio airplay in France, the New York City area of the United States and Tunisia.

== Discography ==
- From Tunisia with Love (52e Rue Est, 1992)
- Nefta-les portes du désert (1993)
- African Flame (Aljazzira, 1998)
- Tabarka (Jazz Metiss D'Aujourd'hui, 2005)

With Spirit of Life Ensemble

- Inspirations (1993)
- Feel the Spirit (1994)
- Live! At the 5 Spot, NY (1995)
- Live at Pori Jazz (1997)
- Collage(1998)
- Song for My Father (1998)
- Live au Duc (2002)
