= Nolan Van Way =

American opera singer (1931–2016)

- Born: January 31, 1931; Bethel, Posey, Indiana, U.S.
- Origin: St. Louis, Missouri, U.S.
- Died: April 3, 2016 (aged 85) Burbank, California, U.S.
- Genres: Opera, Broadway musicals
- Occupations: Musician, actor, vocal coach
- Instruments: Singing (Baritone, Tenor)
- Years active: 1956–2016
- Website: nolanvanway.com

Nolan Royce Van Way (January 31, 1931 – April 3, 2016) was an American operatic baritone and tenor whose stage career, in opera and Broadway musicals, spanned half a century. He sang in many languages including French, German, Italian, Russian, and Spanish. After retiring from the stage, Van Way became a vocal coach.

== Early life and musical training ==
Van Way initially attended Evansville College, then went to Indiana University School of Music in the 1950s. While attending Indiana University, he studied opera, theater, and television production. Having trained under bass-baritone Carl Van Buskerk, Van Way started his career as a baritone. He performed the role of Figaro in the Indiana University production of the opera The Barber of Seville.

Van Way began his professional career in 1956 as a resident baritone at the St. Louis Municipal Opera.

== Baritone career ==
After university, Van Way moved to New York City. His first job was at the Radio City Music Hall, performing in the Glee Club. In 1958, he appeared in various roles in the Broadway production of Oh, Captain! He continued his studies in opera at the Manhattan School of Music. The following year, Van Way appeared in Destry Rides Again, co-starring with Andy Griffith and Dolores Gray. He left Destry to play the lead role in Redhead.

Van Way was based in New York City for the next 15 years, and performed with various opera companies throughout the United States. He toured with many Broadway shows and sang in summer stock theatres. While working for the Metropolitan Opera Studio Company in 1962, he was awarded a Ford Foundation grant.

In February 1962, at a White House performance of Mozart's Così fan tutte for children from Washington embassies hosted by Jacqueline Kennedy in the State Dining Room, Van Way was signing autographs when he accidentally tilted the three-foot-long ostrich feather attached to his costume's turban into some lighted candles, causing the headdress to catch on fire. Rudolf Bing, the manager of the Metropolitan Opera who was acting as the master of ceremonies, snatched the flaming turban off of Van Way's head; it was extinguished quickly.

Van Way made his European opera début at the Nuremberg Opera as Escamillo in Carmen. He also appeared as the Don in Don Giovanni in Braunschweig.

Van Way returned to the United States to sing in Die Fledermaus with the Stadium Symphony Orchestra, and then played the King in Carl Orf's Die Kluge Van Way worked for the Metropolitan Opera's national company before returning to Barcelona to sing the part of Zar in Lortzing's Zar und Zimmerman. Returning to the United States, he sang in many productions including Show Boat and Carmen, and played the King in Levy's Escorial. At the New York City Opera, he played the Don in Don Giovanni, Escamillo in Carmen, and the Count in The Marriage of Figaro. In 1967, at the Seattle Opera, he played Mercutio opposite Franco Corelli in Romeo and Juliet. Shortly afterwards, he returned to the East Coast to receive a grant from the Rockefeller Foundation. The grant enabled him to train to become a tenor.

== Tenor career ==
Van Way's first role as a tenor was Rodolfo in La bohème with the Opera Orchestra of New York. He then moved to Lyon, France, for two years while singing in operas throughout Europe, including Macbeth, Carmen, Lucia, and Falstaff. Upon his return to the United States, he sang the title role in the Seattle Opera's production of Faust. He also sang in Die Fledermaus, Beggar's Opera, Annie Get Your Gun, Bitter Sweet, The Merry Widow, Carmen, Kiss Me Kate, and Show Boat. He performed with Beverly Sills, Florence Henderson, Mary Costa, and Roberta Peters.

== Teaching ==
In 1976, Van Way moved to California, where he headed the vocal department at San Diego State University for seven years. He worked also as a private vocal coach to many music and film stars over the next 16 years. He sang in the 1987 film Slam Dance. Van Way moved to Mexico in 1992 but continued to perform in the United States until 2006. He sang in La Cage Aux Folles, Kismet, Annie Get Your Gun, Die Fledermaus, and Show Boat, as well as performing with philharmonic orchestras and at community concerts. In Mexico, he trained Fernando Figueroa and Reynaldo Ruiz to create the Three Tenors of Mexico. They toured Mexico from 2002 to 2006. Van Way later lived with his wife Maria in Puerto Escondido, Oaxaca, where he was a realtor and continued to teach singing. His students included Reynaldo Ruiz Larrea and Fernando Figueroa Méndez.

== Death ==
Nolan Van Way died in Burbank, California on April 3, 2016, at the age of 85.
