= Warwick Musical Theatre =

- The Tent
- Interactive map of Warwick Musical Theatre
- Location: 510 Quaker Lane, Warwick, Rhode Island 02818
- Coordinates: 41.6817°N 71.4965°W
- Owner: The Bonoff Family
- Capacity: 3,300+
- Type: Indoor

Construction
- Opened: 1955
- Renovated: 1967
- Closed: 1999
- Demolished: June 2002

Warwick Musical Theatre was a musical theater located on Route 2 in Warwick, Rhode Island.

Buster Bonoff opened the theater in 1955 on an open field. Initially, it hosted touring Broadway shows but, by the 1970s, "big-name" entertainers became its standard offering.

In 1967, the original tent was replaced with a 3,300-seat theater in the round that used a building from the 1964 New York World's Fair. It also hosted yearly summer shows by World Wrestling Entertainment until 1999.

== Demise ==
The theater faced increasing competition from larger venues and the Foxwoods and Mohegan Sun casinos in Connecticut, and it hosted a farewell season in 1999, ending its 54th season with a concert by Vince Gill.

Buster and Barbara Bonoff did not live long after the theater closed. Buster died in 2000 and Barbara in 2003.

The Warwick Musical Theatre was torn down in June 2002, and a Lowe's now occupies the site. as of 2025, a Taco Bell is also located in the same area.

Since its demise, the theater has been honored by a pair of Rhode Island artists. Frank Galasso included it in his lithographs Remember When... and Icons of Rhode Island Past and present. Duke Marcoccio made a commemorative ornament as a part of his series of "My Little Town" Rhode Island landmarks.
