= Stuart Pendred =

British classical baritone singer

Stuart Pendred is a classical baritone singer. He released his first album "Benedizione" in June 2008.

Pendred was part of the trio "Tricolore" who were competitors in 2005 to be the United Kingdom's Eurovision entry with their song "Brand New Day" which Pendred co-wrote. He also appeared in the play Les Misérables. Pendred has performed with Sting, Lionel Richie, Beyoncé, Mariah Carey, The Opera Babes, Il Divo and Westlife and the Royal Philharmonic Orchestra. He has performed the Royal Albert Hall, in the West End of London, before 75,000 fans at Twickenham for the Rugby Football Union, and in venues in Europe and the United States. He has also performed at the Davis Cup for the Lawn Tennis Association; the British Olympic Association and numerous pre-match performances for Chelsea Football Club at Stamford Bridge Stadium.

Pendred is a Chelsea fan and has sung at several of their games including their Champions League Semi Final against Liverpool in 2008.

He has also done extensive voice work in audio drama, including as the voice of William Wallace in Heirloom Audio's adaptation of G.A. Henty's In Freedom's Cause.

== Early career ==
Stuart's singing career began when he sang the alto-line with the singing company at Bedford Congress Hall Salvation Army. Stuart has recently formed a new company, Opera Prima, that provides classical music to the sports and corporate hospitality arenas. Highlights for Stuart already include performing before,

== Current activities ==
Pendred was scheduled to release his second album in 2011. In addition to this, Pendred joined forces with Stringfever, an electric string quartet, to co-write lyrics and be the guest vocalist on a new song to support the England football team at the World Cup in South Africa. "Forever England!" was co-written by Stuart and Jeff Chegwin, with the track composed by Dave Mindel and arranged by Stringfever.

The track was launched, before an audience of music industry, TV and sporting celebrities on Tuesday 27 April at the BBC Club in London.
