= Normal as Blueberry Pie – A Tribute to Doris Day =

Normal as Blueberry Pie - A Tribute to Doris Day

Studio album by Nellie McKay
- Released: October 13, 2009
- Genre: Pop
- Length: 43:46
- Label: Verve Records
- Producers: Nellie McKay, Robin Pappas

Nellie McKay chronology
Obligatory Villagers (2007)	Normal as Blueberry Pie - A Tribute to Doris Day (2009)	Home Sweet Mobile Home (2010)

Professional ratings
Review scores
Source	Rating
Allmusic	4/5 stars
Pitchfork Media	(7.4/10)
Robert Christgau	(A)

Normal as Blueberry Pie – A Tribute to Doris Day is the fourth studio album by American singer-songwriter, Nellie McKay. Released in 2009 by Verve Records, it is McKay's first cover album, composed of songs previously recorded by American singer and actress Doris Day, except the track "If I Ever Had a Dream", which is an original song written by McKay in tribute to Day.

The album with the bonus track, "I Want To Be Happy", was made available through Barnes & Noble. Additionally, the iTunes edition of the album features a different bonus track, "I'll Never Smile Again".

== Track listing ==
Standard release
No.	Title	Writer(s)	Length
1.	"The Very Thought of You"	Ray Noble	2:10
2.	"Do Do Do"	George Gershwin; Ira Gershwin	3:13
3.	"Wonderful Guy"	Oscar Hammerstein II; Richard Rodgers	3:11
4.	"Meditation"	Norman Gimbel; Antônio Carlos Jobim	4:01
5.	"Mean to Me"	Fred E. Ahlert; Roy Turk	2:42
6.	"Crazy Rhythm"	Irving Caesar; Roger Wolfe Kahn; Joseph Meyer	2:54
7.	"Sentimental Journey"	Les Brown; Bud Green, Ben Homer	2:47
8.	"If I Ever Had a Dream"	Nellie McKay	3:47
9.	"Black Hills of Dakota"	Sammy Fain; Paul Francis Webster	4:02
10.	"Dig It"	Johnny Mercer	2:52
11.	"Send Me No Flowers"	Burt Bacharach; Hal David	3:21
12.	"Close Your Eyes"	Bernice Petkere	4:22
13.	"I Remember You"	Johnny Mercer; Victor Schertzinger	4:24
Total length:			43:46

Barnes and Noble exclusive edition
No.	Title	Writer(s)	Length
14.	"I Want to Be Happy"	Vincent Youmans; Irving Caesar; Otto Harbach	2:31
Total length:			46:17

iTunes edition bonus track
No.	Title	Writer(s)	Length
14.	"I'll Never Smile Again"	Ruth Lowe	2:27
Total length:			46:13

== Charts ==
Chart (2009)	Peak position
US Billboard 200	198
US Heatseekers Albums (Billboard)	5
US Top Jazz Albums (Billboard)	5
