= Robin Pappas =

American actress

- Born: United States
- Spouse: Malcolm McKay (?—c. 1984)
- Children: Nellie McKay

Robin Pappas is an American actress.

She graduated in 1974 from RADA (the Royal Academy of Dramatic Art).

Her credits include The Shining and Superman II, as well as an uncredited role in Chariots of Fire. She is the mother of singer-songwriter Nellie McKay. She also served as the executive producer of her daughter's second album, Pretty Little Head and co-produced fifth album Home Sweet Mobile Home with McKay herself. She appeared in the music video for "David".

== Partial filmography ==
- The Shining (1980) - Nurse
- Superman II (1980) - Alice
- Chariots of Fire (1981) - Clare (uncredited) (final film role)
