= Nellie McKay =

American singer and songwriter

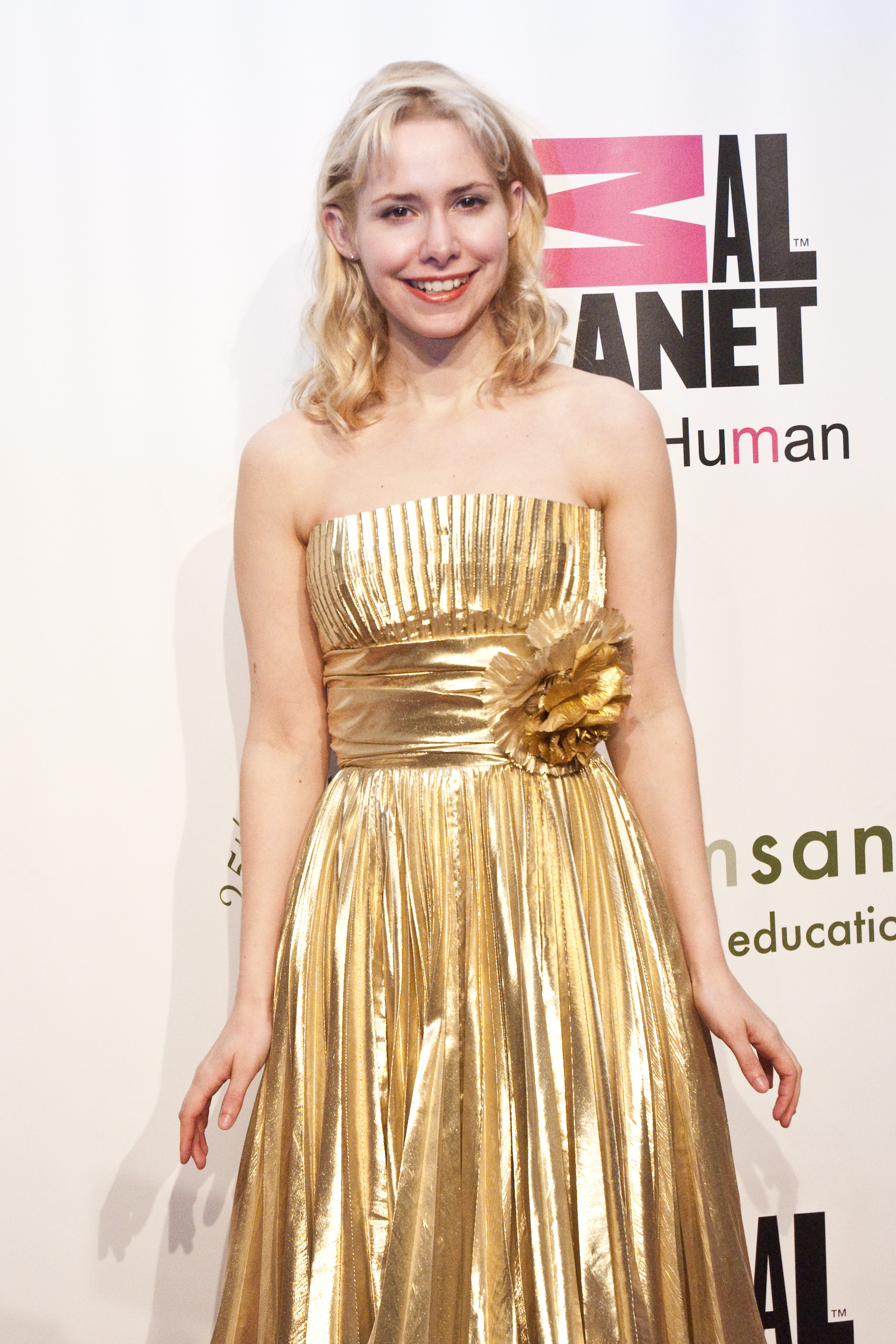
- McKay in May 2011

Background information
- Born: Eleanora Marie McKay; April 13, 1982 (age 44); London, England
- Origin: Manhattan, New York City
- Occupations: Musician; songwriter
- Instruments: Vocals; piano; ukulele
- Years active: 2003–present
- Labels: Columbia; Vanguard; Verve
- Website: nelliemckay.com

Eleanora Marie McKay (born April 13, 1982) is an English–American singer and songwriter. She made her Broadway debut in The Threepenny Opera (2006).

== Early life and education ==
McKay was born in London to an English father, writer-director Malcolm McKay, and an American mother, actress Robin Pappas. She also has a half sister, author Alice Clark Platts. She holds dual citizenship. While growing up, she lived with her mother in Harlem, New York, in Olympia, Washington and in Mount Pocono, Pennsylvania. She studied jazz voice at the Manhattan School of Music, but did not graduate. Her performances at various New York City music venues, including the Sidewalk Cafe and Joe's Pub, drew attention from record labels.

== Career ==
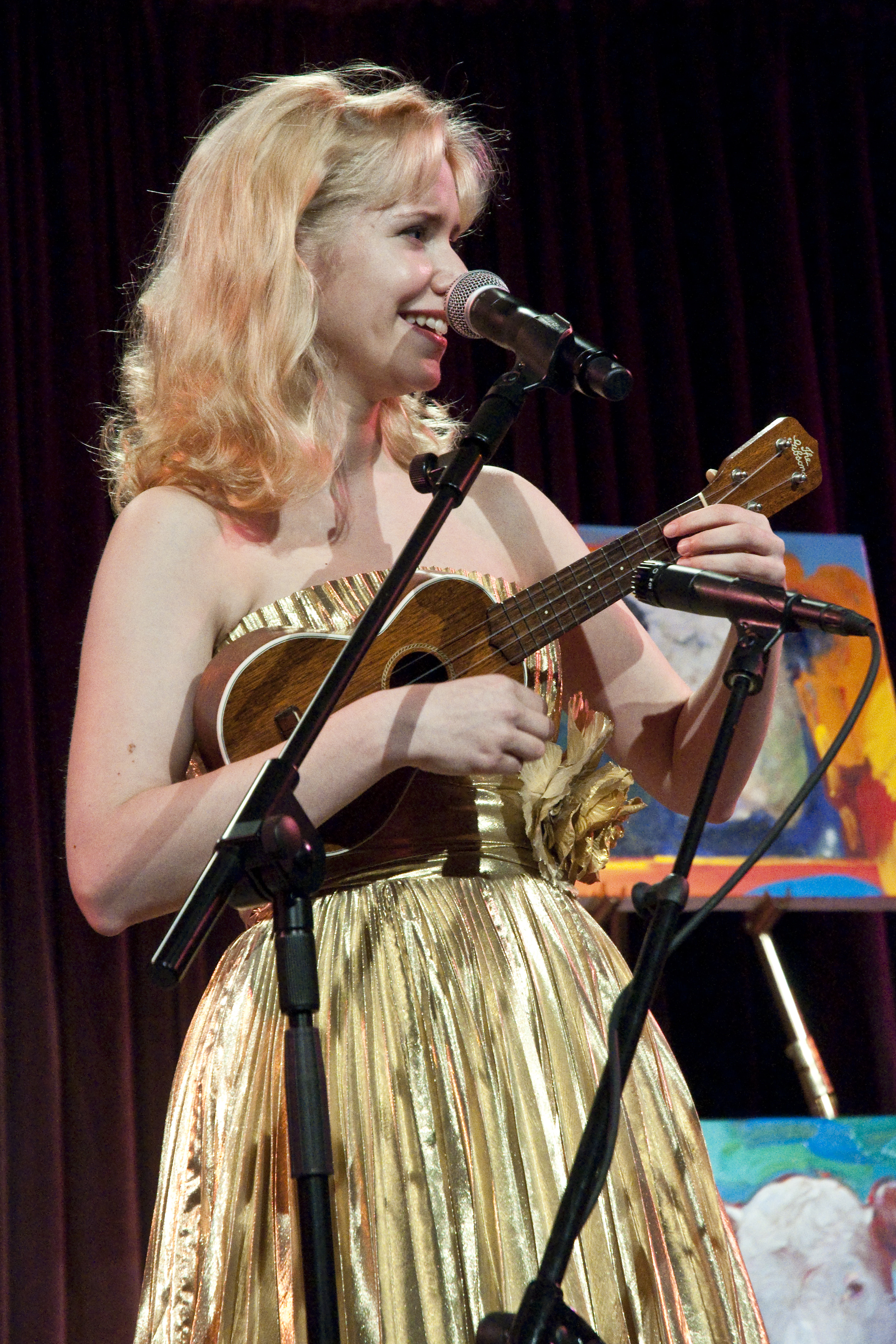
Nellie McKay at the Farm Sanctuary 25th Anniversary Gala in New York City (2011)

=== 2004–2006 ===
The recording sessions for McKay's debut album, Get Away from Me, took place in August 2003 with Geoff Emerick as producer. Emerick was known for working as the Beatles' engineer on such albums as Revolver and Abbey Road. The title is a play on Norah Jones' Come Away with Me.

Get Away from Me was released in February 2004. Jon Pareles of The New York Times called the album "a tour de force from a sly, articulate musician who sounds comfortable in any era". The album was included on several "Best of 2004" lists.

McKay was one of the major breakout artists from the 2004 SXSW Festival and was a finalist in the 2004 Shortlist Music Prize. She toured the northern United States in July 2004 as an opening act on the first half of the Au Naturale tour co-headlined by Alanis Morissette and Barenaked Ladies.

Pretty Little Head was released in the United States on 31 October 2006 on McKay's own label, Hungry Mouse, and was marketed by SpinART Records.

McKay made her Broadway debut as Polly Peachum in the Roundabout Theatre Company's limited-run production of The Threepenny Opera, co-starring with Alan Cumming, Jim Dale, Cyndi Lauper, and Brian Charles Rooney. The role earned her a Theatre World Award for Outstanding Debut Performance.

=== 2007–present ===
McKay's third full-length studio release debuted on 25 September 2007. With both her previous albums lasting over 60 minutes and spanning two discs each, Obligatory Villagers, with only nine tracks (ten if purchased from the iTunes Store) totaling 30 minutes, was her shortest release to date.

On October 13, 2009 she released her fourth studio album, Normal as Blueberry Pie – A Tribute to Doris Day on Verve Records. The album contains twelve covers of songs made famous by Day, as well as one original tune. Barnes & Noble featured an exclusive edition, packaged with the bonus track "I Want To Be Happy". iTunes also featured an exclusive edition with a different bonus track, "I'll Never Smile Again".

On September 28, 2010 McKay and Verve Records released her fifth album, Home Sweet Mobile Home, with original tracks. It was produced by McKay and her mother, Robin Pappas, with artistic input from David Byrne.

In 2013, McKay appeared in the Off-Broadway revue show Old Hats.

On March 24, 2015 McKay released her sixth album, My Weekly Reader, a covers album of songs from the 1960s. Songs include Moby Grape's "Murder in My Heart for the Judge", The Small Faces' "Itchycoo Park", the Steve Miller Band's "Quicksilver Girl", Frank Zappa's "Hungry Freaks, Daddy", The Beatles' "If I Fell", The Cyrkle's "Red Rubber Ball", and Herman's Hermits' "Mrs. Brown, You've Got a Lovely Daughter".

On February 1, 2017, McKay joined Laurie Anderson, Joan Osborne, Suzanne Vega and the Brooklyn Philharmonic Orchestra for Four Scored, a single performance of reworked songs at the Brooklyn Academy of Music.

McKay, along with violinist Philippe Quint, starred in and contributed music to the independent film Downtown Express, directed by David Grubin.

Her musical show I Want to Live! is based on the life of murderer Barbara Graham, who also inspired a 1958 film with the same title.

== Personal life ==
McKay is a vocal feminist, and wrote a satirical song relating to feminist issues called "Mother of Pearl". She is a vegan.

McKay "is a proud member of PETA" (album notes); her song "Columbia Is Bleeding" dealt with the issue of Columbia University's cruelty to animals. She wrote a 2004 song ("John John") about her feelings in favor of political candidate Ralph Nader over Democratic presidential candidate John Kerry.

She has performed at events for the progressive radio station WBAI, Planned Parenthood, Farm Sanctuary, and the Coalition to Ban Horse-Drawn Carriages, among many groups. McKay was one of several musicians to write a song in support of Georgia death row inmate Troy Davis.

In 2018, she appeared on The Jimmy Dore Show, a progressive political commentary show on YouTube, where she performed several of her songs and discussed her political views with Dore. She has also appeared as a guest on Dore's live show.

== Discography ==
=== Albums ===
- Get Away from Me (2004)
- Pretty Little Head (2006)
- Obligatory Villagers (2007)
- Normal as Blueberry Pie - A Tribute to Doris Day (2009)
- Home Sweet Mobile Home (2010)
- My Weekly Reader (2015)
- Sister Orchid (2018)
- Bagatelles (EP) (2019)
- Hey Guys, Watch This (2023)
- Gee Whiz: The Get Away From Me Demos (2025)

=== Soundtracks and covers ===
- 2005: Grey's Anatomy: "David", "The Dog Song"
- 2005: Rumor Has It: "Pasadena Girl", "Face of a Faith"
- 2005: Monster-in-Law: "Won't U Please B Nice"
- 2005: Weeds: "David"
- 2007: P.S. I Love You: ""P.S. I Love You"
- 2010: Terrible Thrills, Vol. 1
- 2010: Downtown Express
- 2010: Boardwalk Empire: "Wild Romantic Blues"
- 2018: Private Life: “Quicksilver Girl”, “Meditation”, “I Wanna Get Married”

=== Collaborations and other appearances ===
- 2005: "If I Needed Someone" from the album This Bird Has Flown - A 40th Anniversary Tribute to the Beatles' Rubber Soul
- 2009: "Light and Night" as a single with the band Tally Hall
- 2010: "How Are You?" from the album Here Lies Love by David Byrne and Fatboy Slim
- 2016: "Pack Up Your Sorrows" duet with Richard Barone from his album Sorrows & Promises: Greenwich Village in the 1960s

=== Other songs ===
- "The In Crowd"
- "John-John"
- "Teresa"
- "Late Again"
- "A Christmas Dirge"
- "Take Me Away"
- "The Cavendish"
- "Compared to What" (Written by Gene McDaniels and made popular by Les McCann. Nellie McKay included it in her performances during 2015.)

== Filmography ==
Year	Title	Role
2007	P.S. I Love You	Ciara Reilly
