= Cherry Hill, Polk County, Arkansas =

Cherry Hill, Arkansas
- Unincorporated community
- Location within Arkansas Location within the United States
- Coordinates: 34°35′09″N 93°59′54″W
- Country: United States
- State: Arkansas
- County: Polk
- Elevation: 886 ft (270 m)
- Time zone: UTC-6 (Central (CST))
  - Summer (DST): UTC-5 (CDT)
- Area code: 479
- GNIS feature ID: 76600

Cherry Hill (also Egger) is an unincorporated community in northeast Polk County, Arkansas, United States. The community is on Arkansas Highway 88 approximately 13 miles east of Mena. The Ouachita River flows past south of the site.

Bob Dorough (1923–2018), composer and musician, was born in Cherry Hill.
