= The Deadwood Stage (Whip-Crack-Away!) =

Song in the 1953 film Calamity Jane

Song by Doris Day

from the album Calamity Jane
- Released: 1953
- Genre: Popular
- Composer: Sammy Fain
- Lyricist: Paul Francis Webster

"The Deadwood Stage (Whip-Crack-Away!)" is a song in the 1953 film Calamity Jane, written by Sammy Fain and Paul Francis Webster, and performed by Doris Day. It was also used in the London stage show Calamity Jane in 2003 and the musical based on Doris Day's greatest hits, A Sentimental Journey.

The song's opening lines are:

Oh! The Deadwood Stage is a-rollin' on over the plains,
with the curtains flappin' and the driver slappin' the reins.
Beautiful sky! A wonderful day!
Whip crack-away!, Whip crack-away!, Whip crack-away!

It goes on to contain a macabre line about Wild Bill Hickok, "on his gun there's more than twenty-seven notches".

In 1957, Clint Walker sings the song in the Cheyenne episode "The Conspirators".

In 2010, Australian singer Melinda Schneider recorded the song for her Doris Day tribute album Melinda Does Doris.
