= Paul Francis Webster =

American lyricist (1907–1984)

- Born: December 20, 1907; New York City, United States
- Died: March 18, 1984 (aged 76); Beverly Hills, California, United States
- Education: Cornell University, New York University
- Occupation: Lyricist
- Family: Guy Webster (son)
- Awards: Academy Award for Best Original Song x 3

Paul Francis Webster (December 20, 1907 – March 18, 1984) was an American lyricist who won three Academy Awards for Best Original Song, and was nominated 16 times for the award.

== Life and career ==
Webster was born in New York City, United States, the son of Myron Lawrence Webster and Blanche Pauline Stonehill Webster. His family was Jewish. His father was born in Augustów, Poland.

He attended the Horace Mann School (Riverdale, Bronx, New York), graduating in 1926, and then went to Cornell University from 1927 to 1928 and New York University from 1928 to 1930, leaving without receiving a degree. He worked on ships throughout Asia and then became a dance instructor at an Arthur Murray studio in New York City. After college, Webster served as an officer in the U.S. Navy.

By 1931, however, he turned his career direction to writing song lyrics. His first professional lyric was "Masquerade" (music by John Jacob Loeb) which became a hit in 1932, performed by Paul Whiteman.

In 1935, Twentieth Century Fox signed him to a contract to write lyrics for Shirley Temple's films, but shortly afterward he went back to freelance writing. His first hit was a collaboration in 1941 with Duke Ellington on the song "I Got It Bad (And That Ain't Good)".

After 1950, Webster worked mostly for Metro-Goldwyn-Mayer. He won two Academy Awards in collaboration with Sammy Fain, in 1953 and 1955, and another with Johnny Mandel in 1965. Altogether, 16 of his songs received Academy Award nominations; among lyricists, he is third after Sammy Cahn with 26 and Johnny Mercer, who was nominated 18 times. In addition, a large number of his songs became major hits on the popular music charts.

Webster was the most successful songwriter of the 1950s on the UK Singles Chart. In 1967, he was asked to write the lyrics for the Spider-Man theme song for the television cartoon series of the same name. He was inducted into the Songwriters Hall of Fame in 1972. His papers are collected at Syracuse University Libraries.

Webster's first born son, Guy Webster, was a prolific photographer of musicians and bands in the 1960s and 1970s. His younger son, Mona Roger Webster, is a conceptual artist, a real estate investor and a longtime resident of Venice, California.

Webster continued writing up to 1983. He died in 1984 in Beverly Hills, California, and is buried at Hillside Memorial Park in Culver City, California.

== List of songs ==
Here is a partial list of songs for which he wrote the lyrics:

=== Songs by Paul Francis Webster that won the Academy Award for Best Original Song ===
- "Secret Love" (Calamity Jane, 1953)
- "Love Is a Many-Splendored Thing" (Love Is a Many-Splendored Thing, 1955)
- "The Shadow of Your Smile" (The Sandpiper, 1965)

=== Nominated for the award ===
- "Remember Me to Carolina" (Minstrel Man, 1944)
- "Friendly Persuasion (Thee I Love)" (Friendly Persuasion, 1956)
- "April Love" (April Love, 1957)
- "A Certain Smile" (A Certain Smile, 1958)
- "A Very Precious Love" (Marjorie Morningstar, 1958)
- "The Green Leaves of Summer" (The Alamo, 1960)
- "Love Theme from El Cid (The Falcon and the Dove)" (El Cid, 1961)
- "Tender Is the Night" (Tender Is the Night, 1962)
- "Love Song From Mutiny on the Bounty (Follow Me)" (Mutiny on the Bounty, 1962)
- "So Little Time" (55 Days at Peking, 1963)
- "A Time for Love" (An American Dream, 1966)
- "Strange Are the Ways of Love" from the film The Stepmother (1972)
- "A World that Never Was" from the film Half a House (1976)

=== Songs winning Grammy Awards for best song of the year ===
- "The Shadow of Your Smile" (love theme from The Sandpiper, 1966)

=== Other songs with lyrics by Paul Francis Webster ===
- "Anastasia" (1956)
- "Ballad of the Alamo" (1960)
- "Baltimore Oriole"
- "Beloved" (1954)
- "Billy-A-Dick" (1945)
- "Black Coffee"
- "The Black Hills of Dakota"
- "Blowing Wild (The Ballad of Black Gold)" (1953)
- "Boy on a Dolphin"
- "The Brown-Skin Gal in the Calico Gown" (1941)
- "Chocolate Shake" (1941)
- "Days of Love" (1967)
- "The Deadwood Stage (Whip-Crack-Away!)"
- "Doctor, Lawyer, Indian Chief"
- "The First Snowfall" (1953) [music composed by Sonny Burke]
- "Guns of Navarone" (1961)
- "Honey-Babe" (1955)
- "How Green Was My Valley" (1957)
- "How It Lies, How It Lies, How It Lies!"
- "I Got it Bad (And That Ain't Good)" (1941)
- "I'll Remember Tonight"
- "I'll Walk with God" (1954)
- "Invitation" (1952)
- "Jump for Joy"
- "Just Blew in from the Windy City" (1953)
- "The Lamplighter's Serenade" (1942)
- "Like Young" (1958)
- "The Loveliest Night of the Year" (1950)
- "Man on Fire"
- "Masquerade" (1931)
- "Maverick"
- "Memphis in June" (1945) for RKO's Johnny Angel, Music by Hoagy Carmichael
- "The Mood I'm In" (co-written with Pete King)
- "My Moonlight Madonna"
- "Padre"
- "Rainbow on the River" (1936)
- "Rio Bravo" (1959)
- "Somewhere My Love" (1966) (The lyrics, which are Webster's original work with Maurice Jarre, were sung to the melody of "Lara's Theme" from the film Doctor Zhivago).
- "The Song Angels Sing" (1951)
- "Song of Green Mansions (1959)
- "The Song of Raintree County" (1957)
- "Spider-Man" (1967)
- "Sugarfoot"
- "Summertime in Heidelberg" (1954)
- "There They Are"
- "There's Never Been Anyone Else But You"
- There's a Rising Moon (1954)
- "Too Beautiful to Last" (1971)
- "The Twelfth of Never"
- "Two Cigarettes in the Dark" (1934)
- "Veni Vidi Vici"
- "Virgins Wrapped in Cellophane" (1932)
- "Who Are We?"
- "The Winds of Chance" (1969)
- "A Woman's Touch" (1953)
- "You Was"

== Song compilation ==
- The Songs of Paul Francis Webster (ISBN 0-7935-0665-4)
- Award-Winning Songs By Paul Francis Webster, Robbins Music Corporation, 1964

== Other sources ==
- Hill, Tony L. "Paul Francis Webster, 1907-1984", in Dictionary of Literary Biography 265. Detroit: Gale Research, 2002.
- Sammy Lifetime Achievement Film Music Award for Paul Francis Webster
