= Boulevard of Broken Dreams (Al Dubin and Harry Warren song) =

Song by Deane Janis with Hal Kemp's Orchestra
- Released: 1933
- Recorded: Chicago, October 31, 1933
- Genre: Traditional pop
- Label: Brunswick
- Composer: Harry Warren
- Lyricist: Al Dubin

"Boulevard of Broken Dreams" is a 1933 hit song with lyrics by Al Dubin and music by Harry Warren.

== Composition ==
Al Dubin and Harry Warren wrote "Boulevard of Broken Dreams" for the 1934 film Moulin Rouge. Dubin's daughter considered it "the theme song of his life". Constance Bennett performs the song onscreen in a sequence choreographed by Russell Markert. It was a hit that charted on Variety's Top 10.

Before the film's release, Hal Kemp's Orchestra recorded the original version with Deane Janis. The song was released by Brunswick Records on October 31, 1933.

Set in Paris, the lyrics include "I walk along the street of sorrow/The Boulevard of Broken Dreams/Where gigolo and gigolette/Can take a kiss without regret/So they forget their broken dreams."

Boulevard of Broken Dreams served as the title tune for a stage musical which played February 11 – March 9, 2003, at the Coconut Grove Playhouse: featuring a libretto by Joel Kimmel, the play was based on the life of composer Al Dubin – played by Jordan Bennett – and featured a number of Dubin compositions as its score.

The song "Boulevard of Broken Dreams" has been added to the score of the stage musical 42nd Street for its 2017 West End run being performed by Sheena Easton in the character of Dorothy Brock: the Daily Express opined that "Boulevard of Broken Dreams" seemed "out of place" in 42nd Street while stating that Easton sang the song "splendidly".

== Renditions ==
- Ted Weems and His Orchestra recorded the song with vocals by Elmo Tanner on December 5, 1933, in Chicago on the Bluebird label as catalog number 5288.
- Jan Garber and His Orchestra recorded the song with vocals by Lee Bennett on December 14, 1933, on the Victor label as catalog number 24498. Their recording remained on the U.S. Billboard chart for 11 weeks and reached number six in 1934.
- Ed Lloyd's Rhythm Boys recorded the song with vocals by Helen Ward on February 2, 1934, on Conqueror Records as catalog number 8261.
- Bing Crosby sang the song with Jimmie Grier and His Orchestra on April 16, 1934, on his radio show Bing Crosby Entertains (the Woodbury series).
- Connee Boswell recorded the song on April 27, 1934, on the Brunswick label for the b-side of the 78rpm single to "Carioca" as catalog numbers 6871 and 01783.
- Bert Ambrose and His Orchestra recorded the song with vocals by Sam Browne in 1934 on the Brunswick label as catalog number 01721.
- María Teresa Vera composed and sang "Veinte años" in 1935 with the melody of the first two lines taken from "Boulevard of Broken Dreams," and Spanish lyrics by Guillermina Aramburu. This song became a Cuban classic, and was later covered by many other Cuban singers.
- Harry Sosnik and His Orchestra recorded the song with vocals by Frances Langford on July 3, 1939, in Los Angeles on the Decca label for the b-side of the 78 rpm single to "Moonglow" as catalog number 2861.
- The King Cole Trio (featuring Jack Costanzo on bongos) recorded the song July 26, 1949.
- "Boulevard of Broken Dreams" is a signature song of Tony Bennett, who was signed by Mitch Miller to Columbia Records on the strength of Bennett's 1949 demo of the song. In his debut Columbia session on 17 April 1950 at CBS 30th Street Studio, Bennett, backed by the Marty Manning orchestra, recorded "Boulevard of Broken Dreams" to serve as Bennett's major label debut single release on 27 April 1950. Bennett subsequently recorded the song in 1990, 2006 (as a duet with Sting for Bennett's Duets: An American Classic album) and 2007.
- Instrumental versions of this song include the version by jazz piano virtuoso Art Tatum, from The Complete Pablo Solo Masterpieces.
- This was the title track of country music crooner Ferlin Husky's 1957 album.
- Billy Eckstine's first greatest-hits compilation, Billy's Best! (1958) with Bobby Tucker Orchestra, arranged by Henry Mancini and Pete Rugolo.
- In 1958, Morton Downey Jr. sang the song on national television, on a set that resembled a dark street with one street light.
- It was covered by No Wave artist James White on his 1983 album Flaming Demonics.
- Marianne Faithfull covered it in her Hal Willner-produced album Strange Weather in 1987, and later on 20th Century Blues (1996).
- It was covered by the progressive rock group Café Jacques on their 1978 album International.
- Leslie Cheung covered it in 1996 and included the cover in the Japanese edition of his album Red.
- Haim Hefer wrote Hebrew lyrics titled "Ha-Peruta veha-Yareach" (הפרוטה והירח) in 1948 to a melody based in part on "Boulevard of Broken Dreams" and in part on "Veinte años."
- Canadian pop crooner Matt Forbes released his contemporary version of the song as a single in May 2022.
- Juan García Esquivel recorded an instrumental cover of the song for the 1959 album, "Exploring New Sounds in Hi-Fi/Stereo". That rendition can be heard in Better Call Saul, Season 1, Episode 2, Mijo (Better Call Saul).
