= Don't Worry 'Bout Me (album) =

Studio album by Billy Eckstine
- Released: 1962
- Recorded: 1962
- Genre: Traditional pop, jazz
- Label: Mercury MG 20736
- Producer: Quincy Jones

Billy Eckstine chronology
| At Basin Street East (1961) | Don't Worry 'Bout Me (1962) | The Golden Hits of Billy Eckstine (1963) |

Don't Worry 'Bout Me is a 1962 studio album by the American singer Billy Eckstine. It was arranged by Billy Byers, conducted by Bobby Tucker, and produced by Quincy Jones. The album peaked at 92 on the Billboard 200, and was highlighted at a "National Breakout Album" by Billboard in November 1962.

== Track listing ==
1. "Till There Was You" (Meredith Willson) – 2:17
2. "What Kind of Fool Am I?" (Leslie Bricusse, Anthony Newley) – 2:53
3. "It Isn't Fair" (Richard Himber, Frank Warshauer, Sylvester Sprigato) – 3:02
4. "(Love Is) The Tender Trap" (Jimmy Van Heusen, Sammy Cahn) – 3:25
5. "Beauty of True Love" – (Barry Mann, Larry Kolber) - 2:24
6. "The Exodus Song" (Ernest Gold) – 2:58
7. "Guilty" (Richard Whiting, Harry Akst, Gus Kahn) – 3:04
8. "Don't Worry 'bout Me" (Rube Bloom, Ted Koehler) – 3:21
9. "Tender Is the Night" – (Sammy Fain, Paul Francis Webster) - 3:13
10. "Jeannie" – (Trevor Stanford / Norman Newell) - 2:36
11. "Stranger in Town" – (Mel Tormé) - 3:09
12. "I Want to Talk About You" (Billy Eckstine) – 3:05

== Personnel ==
- Billy Eckstine – vocals
- Billy Byers – arranger
- Bobby Tucker – conductor
- Quincy Jones – producer
