= No Cover, No Minimum =

1960 live album by Billy Eckstine

Live album by Billy Eckstine
- Released: August 30, 1960
- Recorded: 1960
- Venue: New Frontier Hotel, Las Vegas
- Genre: Jazz, traditional pop
- Length: 64:54
- Label: Roulette
- Producer: Teddy Reig

Billy Eckstine chronology
Basie and Eckstine, Inc. (1959)	No Cover, No Minimum (1960)	Once More with Feeling (1960)

Professional ratings
Review scores
Source	Rating
The Penguin Guide to Jazz Recordings	4/4 stars

No Cover, No Minimum is a live album by Billy Eckstine that was recorded in Las Vegas. The album was released by Roulette in 1960 and reissued by Blue Note in 1992 with ten additional tracks.

== Track listing ==
1. "Have a Song on Me" (Billy Eckstine) – 1:08
2. "I've Grown Accustomed to Her Face" (Alan Jay Lerner, Frederick Loewe) – 2:26
3. "Lady Luck" (Lloyd Price, Harold Logan) – 3:03
4. "Lush Life" (Billy Strayhorn) – 4:04
5. "Without a Song" (Vincent Youmans, Edward Eliscu, Billy Rose) – 2:17
6. "Moonlight in Vermont" (John Blackburn, Karl Suessdorf) – 2:56
7. "I Want a Little Girl" (Billy Moll, Murray Mencher) – 2:02 ‡
8. Medley: "Prelude to a Kiss"/"I'm Beginning to See the Light" (Duke Ellington, Irving Mills, Mack Gordon)/(Ellington, Don George, Johnny Hodges, Harry James) – 4:56 ‡
9. "Fools Rush In" (Rube Bloom, Johnny Mercer) – 2:12 ‡
10. "In the Still of the Night" (Cole Porter) – 3:41 ‡
11. "Prisoner of Love" (Leo Robin, Russ Columbo, Clarence Gaskill) – 1:57 ‡
12. "Little Mama" (Eckstine, Sid Kuller) – 3:23 ‡
13. "I Apologise" (Eric Nelson, Al Hoffman, Al Goodhart) – 1:57 ‡
14. "Till There Was You" (Meredith Willson) – 3:25 ‡
15. Medley: "I Let a Song Go Out of My Heart"/"I Got It Bad (and That Ain't Good)" – (Ellington, Mills, Henry Nemo, John Redmond)/(Ellington, Paul Francis Webster) – 6:08 ‡
16. "Alright, Okay, You Win" (Sidney Wyche, Mayme Watts) – 3:22 ‡
17. "'Deed I Do" (Fred Rose, Walter Hirsch) – 2:21
18. "It Might as Well Be Spring" (Richard Rodgers, Oscar Hammerstein II) – 2:44
19. "That's for Me" (Rodgers, Hammerstein) – 2:25
20. "You'll Never Walk Alone" (Rodgers, Hammerstein) – 3:20
21. "Misty" (Erroll Garner, Johnny Burke) – 5:07

‡: previously unreleased tracks, from the 1992 reissue.

== Personnel ==
- Billy Eckstine – vocals, trumpet
- Charlie Walp – trumpet
- Bucky Manieri – trombone
- Buddy Balboa – saxophone
- Charlie McLean – saxophone
- Bobby Tucker – piano, arranger
- Buddy Grievey – drums

Production

- Teddy Reig – producer
- Wally Heider – engineer
- Will Friedwald – liner notes
