= I Want a Little Girl (song) =

"I Want a Little Girl" (recorded by some female singers as the gender-swapped "I Want a Little Boy") is a popular song with music by Murray Mencher and lyrics by Billy Moll, published in 1930.

The original recording was made by McKinney's Cotton Pickers with vocals by George Thomas on July 30, 1930 for Victor Records, but the song has been recorded by many other artists since then, including Louis Armstrong, Count Basie, Ray Charles, Buddy Rich, Oscar Peterson, T-Bone Walker, Ella Fitzgerald, Etta Jones, Ben E. King, Eric Clapton and B.B. King.

== Selected recordings ==
- 1930 McKinney's Cotton Pickers with vocals by George Thomas, RCA Victor 23000, B-side to "Okay, Baby".
- 1939 Big Joe Turner recorded the song as a single. It appeared on his 1956 album The Boss of the Blues.
- 1948 Louis Armstrong recorded as a single A-side, with "Joseph and His Brudders" on the B-side, RCA Victor 20-2612.
- 1952 Count Basie, on his album Basie Jazz, released in 1954.
- 1952 Count Basie, on his album The Swinging Count!, released in 1956 on the Clef label.
- Between 1952 and 1958 Ray Charles, on his album Yes Indeed!, released in 1958.
- 1956 Joe Williams, on his album A Night at Count Basie's.
- 1959 Nat King Cole, on his album Welcome to the Club.
- 1959 Billy Eckstine and the Count Basie Orchestra, on the album Basie/Eckstine Incorporated, released by Roulette Records.
- 1959 Buddy Rich, on his album Richcraft.
- 1959 Buddy Rich, on his album The Voice Is Rich.
- 1960 Billy Eckstine, on his album No Cover, No Minimum.
- 1960 The Four Coins, released as a single (MGM Records K12951, B-side to "Pledging My Love").
- 1960 Stanley Turrentine with The Three Sounds, on their album Blue Hour, released 1961.
- 1961 Jack McDuff, on his album The Honeydripper.
- 1961 Ike Quebec, on his album Heavy Soul released on the Blue Note label.
- 1962 Count Basie, on his album Count Basie and the Kansas City 7.
- 1964 Junior Mance, on his album That's Where It Is!, released in 1965.
- 1964 Oscar Peterson, featuring Clark Terry, on the album Oscar Peterson Trio + One.
- 1965 Joe Hinton, released as a single reaching 132 on the Billboard Hot 100 and 34 in the Hot R&B/Hip-Hop Songs chart in the US.
- 1966 Illinois Jacquet, on his album Go Power!.
- 1966 Wynton Kelly, on his album Full View, released on the Milestone label.
- 1966 Pee Wee Russell and Red Allen, on their album The College Concert released on the Impulse! label.
- 1967 Lou Donaldson, on his album Alligator Bogaloo.
- 1967 Phil Upchurch, on his album Feeling Blue, released in 1968 on the Milestone label.
- 1968 T-Bone Walker recorded the song and also named the album on which the track occurred album after it. The album was not released until 1973.
- 1975 The Lee Konitz Trio, on their album Oleo.
- 1978 Eddie "Cleanhead" Vinson, recorded the song and also named the album on which it occurred after it. It was recorded and released by the Pablo label.
- 1980 Junior Mance, on his album Deep.
- 1983 Count Basie, on his album Mostly Blues...and Some Others.
- 1986 Ella Fitzgerald and Joe Pass, on their album Easy Living.
- 1990 or 1992 Jay McShann on his album Some Blues, recorded in 1990 and 1992 and released on the Chiaroscuro label in 1993.
- 1991 Joey Baron, on his album Tongue in Groove.
- 1999 Ben E. King, on his album Shades of Blue.
- 2002 Eric Clapton, on his album One More Car, One More Rider.
- 2003 B.B. King, on his album Reflections.

== Selected gender-swapped versions, "I Want a Little Boy" ==
- 1956 Kay Starr, on her album The One, The Only Kay Starr.
- 1956 Sylvia Syms, on her album Sylvia Syms Sings.
- 1962 Ernestine Allen, on her album Let It Roll.
- 1977 Carrie Smith, on her album When You're Down and Out.
- 1986 Etta Jones, on her album Fine and Mellow, released in 1987.
- 1999 Lavay Smith & Her Red Hot Skillet Lickers, on her album Everybody's Talkin' 'bout Miss Thing!, released in 2000.
