= Midnight Flyer =

Midnight Flyer may refer to:

- "Midnight Flyer" (song), a 1959 song recorded by Nat King Cole
- Midnight Flyer, a song on On the Border by the Eagles.
- Midnight Flyer, a rock band fronted by Maggie Bell
- The Midnight Flyer, a 1918 American short action film directed by George Marshall
- The Midnight Flyer, a 1925 American drama film directed by Tom Forman
