= Basie/Eckstine Incorporated =

Studio album by Billy Eckstine and the Count Basie Orchestra
- Released: 1959
- Recorded: May 22 – July 28, 1959
- Genre: Jazz
- Length: 37:46
- Label: Roulette
- Producer: Teddy Reig

Count Basie Orchestra chronology
Breakfast Dance and Barbecue (1959)	Basie/Eckstine Incorporated (1959)	Strike Up the Band (1959)

Billy Eckstine chronology
Billy Eckstine's Imagination (1958)	Basie/Eckstine Incorporated (1959)	No Cover, No Minimum (1960)

Professional ratings
Review scores
Source	Rating
AllMusic	4/5 stars
The Rolling Stone Jazz Record Guide	3/5 stars

Basie/Eckstine Incorporated is a 1959 studio album by Billy Eckstine and the Count Basie Orchestra. It was released by Roulette Records and marked Eckstine and Basie's only recorded collaboration.

== Track listing ==
1. "Stormy Monday Blues" - 3:11
2. "Lonesome Lover Blues" (Billy Eckstine, Gerald Valentine) - 3:08
3. "Blues, the Mother of Sin" (Eckstine, Sid Kuller) - 3:41
4. "Jelly, Jelly" (Eckstine, Earl Hines) - 3:02
5. "Don't Cry Baby" (James P. Johnson, Saul Bernie, Stella Unger) - 3:31
6. "Trav'lin' All Alone" (J. C. Johnson) - 2:54
7. "Little Mama" (Eckstine, Kuller) - 3:29
8. "I Want a Little Girl" (Billy Moll, Murray Mencher) - 3:25
9. "Drifting" (Charles Brown, Johnny Moore, Eddie Williams) - 3:59
10. "Song of the Wanderer" (Neil Moret) - 3:22
11. "Piano Man" (Eckstine, Kuller) - 4:04

== Personnel ==
- Billy Eckstine - vocals

The Count Basie Orchestra

- Count Basie - piano
- Marshal Royal - lead alto saxophone
- Frank Wess - alto saxophone, flute
- Frank Foster, Billy Mitchell - tenor saxophone
- Charlie Fowlkes - baritone saxophone
- Thad Jones, Wendell Culley, Joe Newman, Snooky Young - trumpet
- Henry Coker, Al Grey, Benny Powell - trombone
- Freddie Green - guitar
- Eddie Jones - double bass
- Sonny Payne - drums
- Bobby Tucker - additional piano
- Quincy Jones, Thad Jones & Bobby Tucker - arrangers

== Production ==
- Teddy Reig - producer
- Michael Cuscuna - CD reissue producer
