= The Best of Peggy Lee: The Capitol Years =

Greatest hits album by Peggy Lee
- Released: November 18, 1997
- Genre: Jazz
- Label: Blue Note

The Best of Peggy Lee: The Capitol Years is a 1997 (see 1997 in music) compilation album by Peggy Lee released on the Blue Note Records label.

== Track listing ==
1. "Why Don't You Do Right" 2:29
2. "For Every Man, There's A Woman" 2:49
3. "Fever" 3:23
4. "Alright, Okay, You Win" 2:23
5. "Blue Prelude" 2:18
6. "Hallelujah, I Love Him So" 2:31
7. "Just For A Thrill" 3:43
8. "Goin' To Chicago" 2:37
9. "I'm A Woman" 2:11
10. "See See Rider" 2:38
11. "You Don't Know" 2:30
12. "Call Me" 2:36
13. "Whisper Not" 2:20
14. "The Thrill Is Gone" 3:36
15. "Seventh Son" 2:25
16. "Please Send Me Someone To Love" 4:11
17. "Mama's Gone, Goodbye" 2:37
18. "I'm Gonna Go Fishin'" 2:07
