= Billy's Best! =

Studio album by Billy Eckstine
- Released: 1958
- Genre: Jazz
- Label: Mercury

Billy Eckstine chronology
| That Old Feeling (1955) | Billy's Best! (1958) | Billy Eckstine's Imagination (1958) |

Professional ratings
Review scores
| Source | Rating |
|---|---|
| AllMusic | 4.5/5 stars |
| The Encyclopedia of Popular Music | 3/5 stars |

Billy's Best! is a 1958 studio album by American jazz and blues singer Billy Eckstine. The album was released by Mercury Records, his first for the label.

Arranged and conducted by Henry Mancini and Pete Rugolo, the lush, romantic arrangements feature strings and woodwinds, along with big band arrangements with swinging brass.

Among the notable tracks are "Stella by Starlight", "The Boulevard of Broken Dreams", "You Don't Know What Love Is", "When the Sun Comes Out", and "Zing! Went the Strings of My Heart".
