= Billy Eckstine Sings with Benny Carter =

Studio album by Billy Eckstine and Benny Carter
- Released: 1986
- Recorded: November 17–18, 1986 in New York City
- Genre: Jazz
- Length: 50:43
- Label: Verve

Billy Eckstine chronology
I Am a Singer (1984)	Billy Eckstine Sings with Benny Carter (1986)

Benny Carter chronology
A Gentleman and His Music (1985)	Billy Eckstine Sings with Benny Carter (1986)	Benny Carter Meets Oscar Peterson (1986)

Billy Eckstine Sings with Benny Carter is a 1986 album by the American singer Billy Eckstine, accompanied by the alto saxophonist Benny Carter. The singer Helen Merrill appears in duet with Eckstine on the first and last songs of the album. This was Eckstine's only LP released on Verve Records, and marked his final album recordings.

Eckstine was nominated for the Grammy Award for Best Jazz Vocal Performance, Male at the 30th Grammy Awards for his work on the album.

== Reception ==
Professional ratings
Review scores
Source	Rating
AllMusic	2.5/5 stars

Scott Yanow reviewed Billy Eckstine Sings with Benny Carter for AllMusic and wrote that "Billy Eckstine's final recording (although he would live until 1993) finds the 72-year-old singer showing his age. Mr. B's famous baritone voice at this late date only hints at his earlier greatness although his phrasing and enthusiasm uplift what could have been a depressing affair." Yanow felt that Carter "...still sounds in his prime on alto" and praised his trumpet solo on "September Song". Eckstine's biographer Cary Ginnell also noted the deterioration in his voice, writing that "...he had by now lost most of his lower range...[his] jazz instincts were still evident, but his chops were gone".

== Track listing ==
1. "You'd Be So Nice to Come Home To" (Cole Porter)
2. "My Funny Valentine" (Richard Rodgers, Lorenz Hart)
3. "Here's That Rainy Day" (Jimmy Van Heusen, Johnny Burke)
4. "Summertime" (George Gershwin, Ira Gershwin, DuBose Heyward)
5. "A Kiss from You" (Benny Carter, Johnny Mercer)
6. "Memories of You" (Andy Razaf, Eubie Blake)
7. "I've Got the World on a String" (Harold Arlen, Ted Koehler)
8. "Now That I Need You" (Benny Moten)
9. "Over the Rainbow" (Arlen, Yip Harburg)
10. "September Song" (Maxwell Anderson, Kurt Weil)
11. "Autumn Leaves" (Joseph Kosma, Jacques Prévert, Mercer)
12. "Didn't We?" (Jimmy Webb)

== Personnel ==
- Billy Eckstine - vocals
- Helen Merrill - vocals on "You'd Be So Nice to Come Home To" and "Didn't We?"
- Benny Carter - alto saxophone
- Bobby Tucker - piano, arranger
- Paul West - double bass
- Vernel Fournier - drums
