= Prisoner of Love =

Prisoner of Love may refer to:

== Music ==
=== Albums ===
- Prisoner of Love (James Brown album), 1963
- Prisoner of Love: The Romantic Billy Eckstine, reissue of Timeless Billy Eckstine, 2006
- Prisoner of Love, by Geoffrey Williams, 1989
- Prisoner of Love (Kenny Garrett album), 1989

=== Songs ===
- "Prisoner of Love" (Hikaru Utada song), 2008
- "Prisoner of Love" (Miami Sound Machine song), 1984
- "Prisoner of Love" (Russ Columbo song), 1931; covered by Billy Eckstine (1945), Perry Como (1945), the Ink Spots (1946), James Brown (1963), and others
- "Prisoner of Love" (Tin Machine song), 1989
- "Prisoner of Love", by Foreigner from The Very Best ... and Beyond, 1992
- "Prisoner of Love", by Jessica 6 from See the Light, 2011
- "Prisoner of Love", by Millie Scott, 1986
- "Prisoner of Love", by Tania Evans, 1998

== Literature ==
- The Prisoner of Love, a 1957 novel by Jean S. MacLeod
- The Prisoner of Love, a 1979 novel by Barbara Cartland
- Prisoner of Love (book), a 1986 memoir by Jean Genet

== Film and television ==
- Prisoner of Love, a 1999 film featuring Naomi Campbell and Eric Thal

=== Television episodes ===
- "Prisoner of Love", A Different World season 5, episode 15 (1992)
- "Prisoner of Love", Bagdad Cafe season 2, episode 9 (1991)
- "Prisoner of Love", Contessa episode 116 (2018)
- "Prisoner of Love", Everything's Relative episode 2 (1999)
- "Prisoner of Love", Freddy's Nightmares season 2, episode 21 (1990)
- "Prisoner of Love", Get a Life season 2, episode 6 (1991)
- "Prisoner of Love", Happy Days season 10, episode 14 (1983)
- "Prisoner of Love", JoJo's Bizarre Adventure: Stone Ocean episode 5 (2021)
- "Prisoner of Love", Law & Order season 1, episode 10 (1990)
- "Prisoner of Love", Philly episode 7 (2001)
- "Prisoner of Love", Pointman season 2, episode 6 (1983)
- "Prisoner of Love", Rush Hour episode 9 (2016)
- "Prisoner of Love", Stalked: Someone's Watching season 3, episode 2 (2012)
- "Prisoner of Love", The Andy Griffith Show season 4, episode 18 (1964)
- "Prisoner of Love", The Love Boat season 7, episode 4c (1983)
- "Prisoner of Love", We Got It Made season 2, episode 6 (1987)

== See also ==
- Prisoners of Love (disambiguation)
