= It Isn't Fair =

Song by Sammy Kaye
- Language: English
- Published: 1933
- Length: 3:18
- Label: RCA Victor Records
- Songwriter(s): Richard Himber, Frank Warshauer, and Sylvester Sprigato

"It Isn't Fair" is a popular song written by Richard Himber, Frank Warshauer, and Sylvester Sprigato and published in 1933. Isham Jones and His Orchestra (vocal by Rita Smith) had a hit with it the same year.

== 1950 revival ==
The song enjoyed a revival in 1950 when the best-known version was done by Don Cornell and the Sammy Kaye orchestra. This recording was released by RCA Victor Records as catalog number 20-3609 (78 rpm) and 47-3115 (45 rpm). It first reached the Billboard Best Sellers chart on February 3, 1950 and lasted for 22 weeks on the chart, peaking at number three.

Other hits with the song that year were by Benny Goodman and His Orchestra (vocal by Buddy Greco); Bill Farrell; and by Les Brown and His Orchestra (vocal by Four Hits and a Miss).

Bing Crosby sang "It Isn't Fair" twice on his radio show in May 1950, though he never made a commercial recording of the song.

The song did not appear in the UK's sheet music charts during this period. However, a British cover version by Steve Conway was released in June 1950.

== Later notable versions ==
- Dinah Washington included it in her album Music for a First Love (1957).
- Billy Eckstine - recorded it for his album Don't Worry 'Bout Me (1962)
