= A Gentleman and His Music =

Studio album by Benny Carter
- Released: 1985
- Recorded: August 1985
- Studio: Copenhagen, Denmark
- Genre: Jazz
- Length: 47:24
- Label: Concord; CJ-285
- Producer: Carl Jefferson

Benny Carter chronology
Skyline Drive (1983)	A Gentleman and His Music (1985)	Billy Eckstine Sings with Benny Carter (1986)

A Gentleman and His Music is an album by saxophonist/composer Benny Carter recorded in 1985 and released by the Concord label.

== Reception ==
Professional ratings
Review scores
Source	Rating
AllMusic	3/5 stars

AllMusic reviewer Scott Yanow stated "For this 1985 session, altoist Benny Carter (then a week short of turning 78 years old) is teamed with the lyrical trumpeter Joe Wilder and the Concord All-Stars .... The results are predictably excellent with the septet swinging with spirit and creativity on four standards, a blues and Carter's original 'A Kiss from You.' This album is well worth tracking down".

== Track listing ==
1. "Sometimes I'm Happy" (Vincent Youmans, Irving Caesar) – 7:39
2. "A Kiss from You" (Benny Carter, Johnny Mercer) – 6:15
3. "Blues for George" (Carter) – 8:09
4. "Things Ain't What They Used to Be" (Mercer Ellington, Ted Persons) – 9:53
5. "Lover Man" (Jimmy Sherman, Jimmy Davis, Ram Ramirez) – 7:28
6. "Idaho" (Jesse Stone) – 8:00

== Personnel ==
- Benny Carter – alto saxophone
- Scott Hamilton - tenor saxophone
- Joe Wilder – trumpet, flugelhorn
- Ed Bickert – electric guitar
- Gene Harris – piano
- John Clayton – bass
- Jimmie Smith – drums
