= Do You Know What It Means to Miss New Orleans? =

Song written by Eddie DeLange and Louis Alter

"Do You Know What It Means to Miss New Orleans" is a song written by Eddie DeLange and Louis Alter, which was first heard in the movie New Orleans in 1947, where it was performed by Louis Armstrong and sung by Billie Holiday.

The song has been recorded by various artists, including:

Artist	Year	Album title	Notes
Louis Armstrong & Billie Holiday	1947	New Orleans soundtrack	Armstrong's rendition of the song was also the theme song for the TV series Frank's Place
Marilyn Maxwell	1947		on The Abbott and Costello Radio Show - April 17, 1947
Eddie Condon	1951	Dr. Jazz Series, Vol. 11	
Frankie Laine	1954	A Musical Portrait of New Orleans	
Fats Domino	1958		
Harry James	1958	Harry's Choice Capitol Records ST1093	
Jonah Jones	1958	Jumpin' With Jonah	
Pete Fountain	1959	Pete Fountain's New Orleans	
Rick Nelson	1961	Rick Is 21	
Al Hirt	1962	At the Mardi Gras	
Marcia Hines	1978	Marcia Hines Live Across Australia Miracle ML703	
Stéphane Grappelli	1981	Vintage 1981	
Maura O'Connell	1982		
Raul Seixas	1984		
Lee Wiley	1985 reissue	The Legendary Lee Wiley: Collector's Items, 1931-1955	date of original recording unknown
Dardanelle	1985	Down Home	
Alliance Hall Dixieland Band	1988	A Closer Walk	
Harry Connick Jr. (with Dr. John)	1988	20	Connick also performed the song with Wynton Marsalis during a 2005 televised benefit concert for the victims of Hurricane Katrina
Alison Krauss	1989		
Ellis Marsalis	1991	Heart of Gold	
Fats Domino	1993		
Yoshio Toyama & Ralph Sutton	1994	Duet	
Martin Taylor featuring Chet Atkins	1995	Portraits	
Four Vagabonds	1996 reissue	Yesteryear's Memories	originally released in 1947? on 78 rpm disc
Rosemary Clooney	1996	Dedicated to Nelson	
Tara Darnell	1996	Let It Shine	
Janet Carroll	2000	I Can't Give You Anything But Love	
The Manhattan Transfer	2000	The Spirit of St. Louis	
Lavay Smith & Her Red Hot Skillet Lickers	2000	Everybody's Talkin' 'bout Miss Thing!	
Suede	2001	On the Day We Met	
Victoria Williams	2002	Sings Some Ol' Songs	
Aki Takase	2003	Plays Fats Waller	
Preservation Hall Jazz Band	2005	Our New Orleans, 2005	benefit album by various artists for Hurricane Katrina relief
Stefano Bollani	2006	Piano Solo	
Ray Stevens	2007	New Orleans Moon	
Paul Sanchez/Shamarr Allen	2007	Meet Me On Frenchmen Street	
Linnzi Zaorski	2007	Hot Wax and Whiskey	
Take 6 featuring Aaron Neville	2008	The Standard	
Neon Swing X-perience	2008	Here to Stay	
Eyran Katsenelenbogen	2009	88 Fingers	
Jimmy Buffett	2010	Encores	
John Boutté	2013		
Dee Dee Bridgewater	2015	Dee Dee's Feathers with Irvin Mayfield and the New Orleans Jazz Orchestra	
Joshua Redman	2023	Where Are We with Gabrielle Cavassa	
