= Now Singing in 12 Great Movies =

Studio album by Billy Eckstine
- Released: 1963
- Recorded: 1963
- Genre: Traditional pop, jazz
- Length: 39:16
- Label: Mercury WC 16334/SR 60834
- Producer: Quincy Jones

Billy Eckstine chronology
The Golden Hits of Billy Eckstine (1962)	Now Singing in 12 Great Movies (1963)	The Modern Sound of Mr. B (1964)

Now Singing in 12 Great Movies is a 1963 studio album by the American singer Billy Eckstine. It was arranged by Billy Byers, conducted by Bobby Tucker, and produced by Quincy Jones.

== Reception ==
Professional ratings
Review scores
Source	Rating
AllMusic	3/5 stars
The Penguin Guide to Jazz	3/4 stars

The 2002 reissue of the album was reviewed by Ken Dryden at AllMusic who critiqued the marketing of the album as a jazz album. Dryden described the music as "very listenable, with a solid performance throughout by Eckstine" though the arrangements he felt were "very predictable, lacking any significant improvising or solos, awash in strings with a rhythm section that seems on autopilot....Billy Eckstine's vocal abilities are never in question, but jazz fans need to know what to expect prior to purchasing this reissue." Now Singing in 12 Great Movies was chosen as a "Four Star Album" at the time of its release from Billboard magazine in February 1964.

== Track listing ==
1. "More (Theme from Mondo Cane)" (Norman Newell, Nino Oliviero, Riz Ortolani) – 2:40
2. "The High and the Mighty" (Dimitri Tiomkin, Ned Washington) – 4:00
3. "Moon River" (Henry Mancini, Johnny Mercer) – 2:38
4. "Never on Sunday" (Manos Hatzidakis, Billy Towne) – 2:47
5. "Tender Is the Night" (Sammy Fain, Paul Francis Webster) – 3:18
6. "Manhã de Carnival (Morning of the Carnival)" (Luiz Bonfá, Antônio Maria) – 2:51
7. "A Felicidade (Adieu Tristesse)" (Antonio Carlos Jobim, Vinícius de Moraes, Andre Michel Salvet) – 2:47
8. "Three Coins in the Fountain" (Sammy Cahn, Jule Styne) – 3:47
9. "Days of Wine and Roses" (Mancini, Mercer) – 2:50
10. "On Green Dolphin Street" (Bronisław Kaper, Ned Washington) – 2:35
11. "My Own True Love" (Mack David, Max Steiner) – 3:29
12. "The Good Life" (Sacha Distel, Jack Reardon) – 3:36
13. "Tonight" (Leonard Bernstein, Stephen Sondheim) – 2:43

== Personnel ==
- Billy Eckstine – vocals
- Billy Byers – arranger
- Bobby Tucker – conductor, piano
- Hal Mooney Orchestra
- Quincy Jones – producer
- Ralph J. Gleason – liner notes

Reissue personnel

- Hollis King – art direction
- Sherniece Smith – art producer
- JoDee Stringham – design
- Ken Drunker – executive producer
- David Garland – reissue liner notes
- Peter Keepnews – liner notes
- Cynthia Sesso – photo research
- Mark Smith – production assistant
- Kevin Reeves – reissue mastering
- Bryan Koniarz – reissue producer
