= The High and the Mighty (1954 song) =

1954 song by Ned Washington and Dimitri Tiomkin

"The High and the Mighty" is a song by Ned Washington and Dimitri Tiomkin from the film of the same name.

At the start of the film's production late in 1953, veteran film composer and musician Dimitri Tiomkin was commissioned to write the film's score. The studio also urged Tiomkin to come up with a theme song for the film, to be released to radio and as a vinyl record. Tiomkin formed the basic melody to the song and enlisted songwriter Ned Washington to write the song's lyrics. What resulted was a gentle ballad. Warner Bros. presented the song to Les Baxter and his orchestra, who recorded and released the song to coincide with the release of the film. When released in 1954, "The High and the Mighty" peaked at number 4 on the Billboard Pop chart.

Both the film score and the song were nominated for Academy Awards in 1955. The song, which ultimately did not win an award, was sung by Johnny Desmond, accompanied by Muzzy Marcellino at the awards show. Dimitri Tiomkin's score won the Academy Award that year.

Toward the end of the film, after John Wayne's character convinced the captain to try to make it to San Francisco rather than ditch, the captain said "Whistle me a tune, Dan. I like music when I work." Dan (John Wayne) whistled a bit of "(I'm a) Ramblin' Wreck from Georgia Tech" (Georgia Tech's famous and catchy fight song). Audiences at the time no doubt immediately recognized it and understood it was a sign of success, as Georgia Tech was in its glory years in football under Bobby Dodd, during which it won six bowl games in six years and was named National Champion by one organization in 1952.

A second and much rarer version of the title song lyrics also exists. In contrast to the romantic motif of the popular hit tune, the secondary version is instead a paean to the crews who guide the airliners through the night skies towards distant cities, and concludes with an allusion to the "high and mighty" as the Deity.

An instrumental version was also recorded in 1954 by the conductor and arranger LeRoy Holmes, reaching number 9 on the Billboard chart. It became Holmes' biggest hit, and his most recognizable. The song is known for its distinctive whistling, which accompanies the music, and which was provided by Fred Lowery (the whistling within the film itself was dubbed by Muzzy Marcellino). Yet another hit version was recorded by Victor Young and his orchestra in 1954, peaking at number 6 on the Billboard chart, and Harry James recorded a version in 1955 on his album, Jukebox Jamboree (Columbia CL 615). Another version, complete with footsteps walking, and whistling, was recorded in the UK by Jimmy Young, with Bob Sharples & His Orchestra, on the Decca label.

Another vocal version with the complete Ned Washington lyrics has been recorded by Billy Eckstine in his album, Now Singing In 12 Great Movies, from the early 1960s. An instrumental version by George Greeley was recorded on his 1959 Warner Bros. album, Greatest Motion Picture Piano Concertos. The Shadows also recorded an instrumental version in 1964 for their album, Dance with The Shadows. A mambo version was recorded in 1958 by Perez Prado & His Orchestra, on RCA Victor 20-5839.

The tune is whistled in the fadeout of the Simon & Garfunkel song "Punky's Dilemma", from their 1968 album Bookends. Toward the end of the 1980 film Seems Like Old Times, Chevy Chase's character can be heard whistling the tune as he walks away from the camera.
