= The Golden Hits of Billy Eckstine =

Studio album by Billy Eckstine
- Released: 1963
- Recorded: January 8, 10, 14, 1963
- Studio: A & R, New York City
- Genre: Traditional pop, jazz
- Length: 39:16
- Label: Mercury MG20796
- Producer: Quincy Jones

Billy Eckstine chronology
Don't Worry 'Bout Me (1962)	The Golden Hits of Billy Eckstine (1963)	Now Singing in 12 Great Movies (1964)

The Golden Hits of Billy Eckstine is a 1963 studio album by the American singer Billy Eckstine. It was arranged by Billy Byers, conducted by Bobby Tucker, and produced by Quincy Jones.

== Reception ==
Professional ratings
Review scores
Source	Rating
AllMusic	3/5 stars

Ron Wynn of AllMusic, with a 3/5-star rating, remarked, "Decent anthology featuring Billy Eckstine pop tracks from the '50s to the '70s. These are largely romantic ballads, some standards, but are neither his most jazz-inflected material, nor his most ambitious. It's a good introductory package."

Negro Digest positively reviewed the album in their September 1963 issue describing it as "a superb album altogether" and that the liner notes of the album were "understated" in their description of Eckstine as "luxurious" and having a "strong sensual undercurrent". The Negro Digest also wondered if Eckstine ever "sang this well at the height of his popularity" from 1948 to 1953.

== Track listing ==
1. "Caravan" (Duke Ellington, Irving Mills, Juan Tizol) – 2:40
2. "I Apologize" (Al Goodhart, Al Hoffman, Ed Nelson) – 3:00
3. "Somehow" (Mort Maser) – 3:42
4. "Blue Moon" (Lorenz Hart, Richard Rodgers) – 2:52
5. "Prisoner of Love" (Clarence Gaskill, Leo Robin, Russ Columbo) – 3:03
6. "My Foolish Heart" (Ned Washington, Victor Young) – 3:18
7. "Everything I Have Is Yours" (Burton Lane, Harold Adamson) – 2:56
8. "My Destiny" (Jerry Livingston, Mack David) – 2:45
9. "I'm Falling For You" (Clarence Williams, George Sanders, Joe "Trafalgar" Hubert) – 2:37
10. "Coquette" (Carmen Lombardo, Gus Kahn, Johnny Green) – 2:38
11. "No Orchids For My Lady" (Alan Stranks, Jack Strachey) – 3:09
12. "Bewildered" (Leonard Whitcup, Teddy Powell) – 3:12

== Personnel ==
- Billy Eckstine – vocals
- Billy Byers – arranger
- Bobby Tucker – conductor
- Unidentified orchestra
- Quincy Jones – producer
