= My Way (Billy Eckstine album) =

Studio album by Billy Eckstine
- Released: November 16, 1966
- Recorded: 1966
- Genre: Traditional pop, jazz
- Label: Motown
- Producer: William "Mickey" Stevenson

Billy Eckstine chronology
The Prime of My Life (1965)	My Way (1966)	For Love of Ivy (1969)

My Way is a 1966 studio album by the American singer Billy Eckstine. It was produced by William "Mickey" Stevenson, and was the second of three albums that Eckstine recorded for Motown Records.

== Track listing ==
1. "A Warmer World" (Ron Miller, Avery Vandenberg)
2. "I Did It All for You" (Frank Wilson, Jimmy Webb)
3. "My Way" (Richard Jacques, Ronald Miller)
4. "And There You Were" (Ron Miller)
5. "I Wish You Were Here" (Frederick "Shorty Long", William "Mickey" Stevenson)
6. "The Answer Is Love" (Smokey Robinson)
7. "A Man Needs a Woman" (Fangette Enzel)
8. "Quiet Room" (Jennie Lee Lambert, Larry Klein, Mickey Gentile)
9. "Lost in the Stars" (Maxwell Anderson, Kurt Weill)
10. "I'll Only Miss Her When I Think of Her" (Sammy Cahn, Jimmy Van Heusen)
11. "Talk to Me" (Eddie Snyder, Rudy Vallée, Stanley Kahan)
12. "Once in a Lifetime" (Anthony Newley, Leslie Bricusse)

== Personnel ==
- Billy Eckstine – vocals
- William "Mickey" Stevenson – producer
