= The Modern Sound of Mr. B =

Studio album by Billy Eckstine
- Released: 1964
- Recorded: 1964
- Genre: Traditional pop, jazz
- Length: 39:16
- Label: Mercury MG 20916/SR 60916
- Producer: Quincy Jones

Billy Eckstine chronology
Now Singing In 12 Great Movies (1963)	The Modern Sound of Mr. B (1964)	The Prime of My Life (1965)

Professional ratings
Review scores
Source	Rating
Record Mirror	4/5 stars

The Modern Sound of Mr. B is a 1964 studio album by the American singer Billy Eckstine. It was produced by Quincy Jones.

== Reception ==
The album was chosen as a "Special Merit Pick" by Billboard magazine upon its release in June 1964. BillBoard commented that "Few singers manage in their careers to achieve a truly distinctive style, but "Mr B." has a style strictly his own." Stereo Review said of the album that "His vocal sound is warm and rich, his polish is obvious. This album is titled "The Modern Sound of Mr. B." It is a misnomer. Eckstine's sound is the same as it always was — like a 45-rpm Sarah Vaughan record played at 33 1/3".

== Track listing ==
1. "Mister Kicks" – (Oscar Brown) 2:20
2. "People" (Jule Styne, Bob Merrill) – 3:13
3. "Satin Doll" (Duke Ellington, Johnny Mercer, Billy Strayhorn) – 3:18
4. "A Beautiful Friendship" (Donald Kahn, Stanley Styne) – 3:25
5. "Wives and Lovers" (Burt Bacharach, Hal David) – 2:30
6. "What Are You Afraid of" – (Jack Segal, Robert Wells) 2:26
7. "Sweet Georgia Brown" (Ben Bernie, Kenneth Casey, Maceo Pinkard) – 1:55
8. "A Garden in the Rain" (James Dyrenforth, Carroll Gibbons) – 2:50
9. "Wouldn't It Be Loverly" (Frederick Loewe, Alan Jay Lerner) – 4:07
10. "Poor Fool" – (Benny Carter) 3:00
11. "Our Once Happy Love" – (Van McCoy) 2:58
12. "Wanted" – (Jack Fulton, Lois Steele) 2:47

== Personnel ==
- Billy Eckstine – Vocals
- Quincy Jones – Producer
