= Behind the Mike (film) =

1937 American comedy film directed by Sidney Salkow

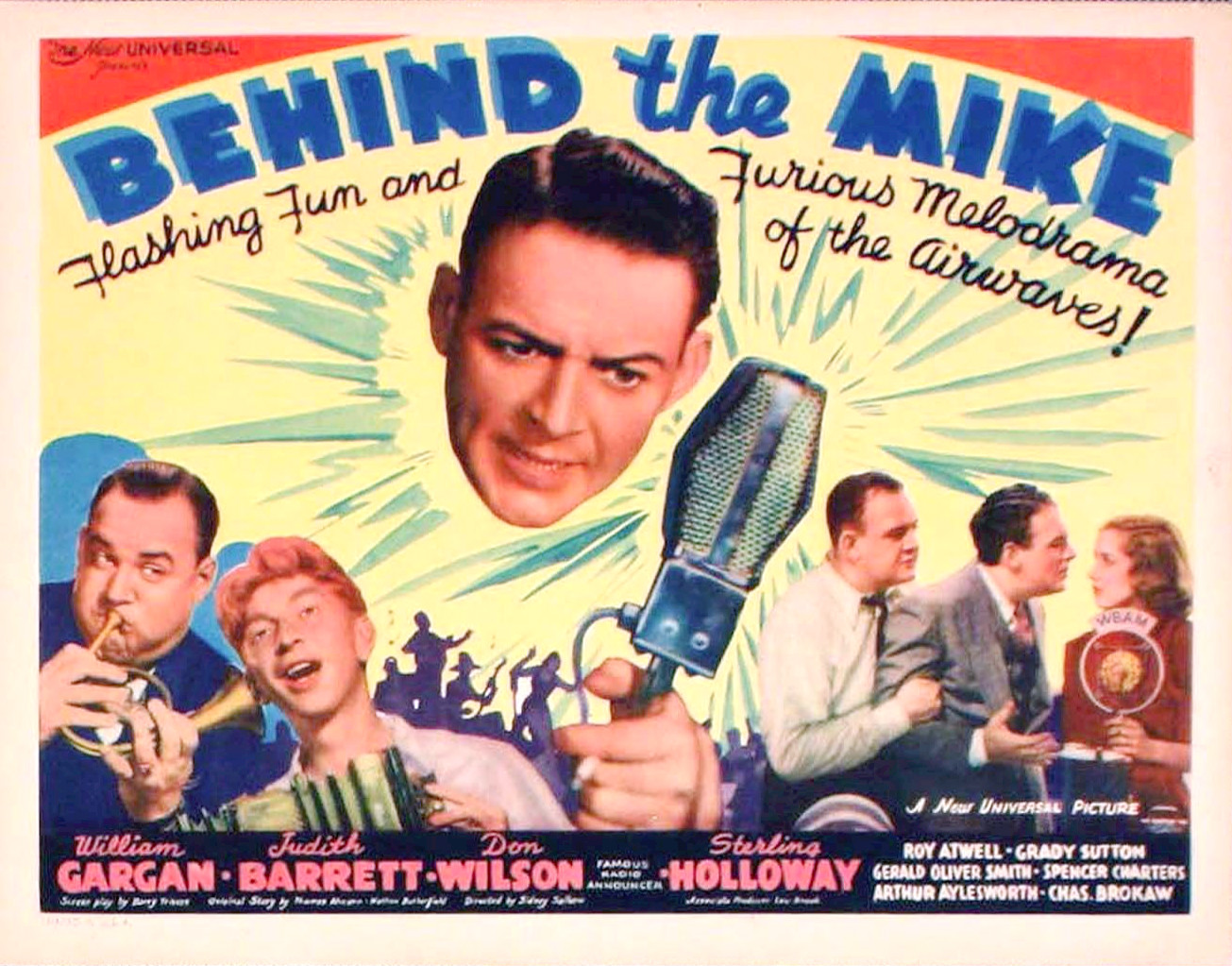
- Theatrical poster for the film
- Directed by: Sidney Salkow
- Screenplay by: Barry Trivers
- Story by: Thomas Ahearn; Walton Butterfield
- Produced by: Lou Brock
- Starring: William Gargan; Judith Barrett; Don Wilson; Sterling Holloway
- Cinematography: Elwood B. Bredell
- Edited by: Philip Cahn
- Music by: Score: Charles E. Henderson; Songs: Jimmy McHugh (music); Harold Adamson (lyrics)
- Production company: Universal Pictures
- Distributed by: Universal Pictures
- Release date: September 26, 1937 (US)
- Running time: 68 minutes
- Country: United States
- Language: English

Behind the Mike is a 1937 American comedy film directed by Sidney Salkow, which stars William Gargan, Judith Barrett, Don Wilson, and Sterling Holloway. The screenplay was written by Barry Trivers from a story by Thomas Ahearn and Walton Butterfield. The film was released on September 26, 1937.

== Plot ==
George Hayes is a radio announcer in New York with a propensity for his smart-aleck behavior and quick temper. During a rehearsal for the "Crunchy Munchy Hour", he gets into a heated argument with the owner of Crunchy Munchies, Cyrus Wittles. The argument ends with Hayes belting Wittles, which also ends Hayes' employment at the radio station. He is lured to the rural community of Valley Falls, where he is promised the job of manager for a local radio station, WBAM. Upon his arrival, he sees a well run station on the main street of the town, and walks in, believing it to be where he will be managing. There he meets Jane Arledge, who is the program manager for WVOX, the actual station he has walked into. Realizing his mistake, Arledge agrees to take him to WBAM, which is actually not much of a station, housed in a barn, with a single employee, Tommy Astor.

Hayes wants to make the station a success, in order to impress Jane. He calls his friend, Tiny Martin, in New York City to come and help him. While they are working to get the station together, Hayes overhears the mayor of the town conspiring with the owner of WVOX, Harry Fox, to rig the upcoming election. He broadcasts the details, which causes a scandal. Jane initially doesn't believe the accusations about her boss, and her tiff with Hayes, along with some coaxing by Tiny, convince Hayes to plan to return to New York City. As Hayes is leaving for the train station, Jane uncovers evidence about her boss's plan to embezzle money from the town after the election, in collusion with the Mayor. Not being able to use WVOX's equipment, she rushes over to WBAM to broadcast her findings. Hayes hears the broadcast at the rail station and fears for Jane's safety, so he returns to town.

The townspeople are incensed at the mayor and Fox, and run them out of town. Jane declares her love for Hayes, and the two depart for New York City, leaving Astor to run the town's only remaining radio station.

== Cast ==
- William Gargan as George Hayes
- Judith Barrett as Jane Arledge
- Don Wilson as Tiny Martin
- Sterling Holloway as Tommy Astor
- William Davidson as Cyrus Wittles
- Gerald Oliver Smith as Robert Ainesley
- Charles Brokaw as Harry Fox
- Spencer Charters as Pete Jones
- Grady Sutton as Curly Conway
- Harlan Briggs as Sheriff
- Roy Atwell as Vale
- Jerry Mandy as First violinist
- Cliff Nazarro as Messenger boy
- Ralph Remley as Reiley
- Arthur Aylesworth as Williams
- Si Jenks as Hec
- Don Barclay as Sparky
- Robert Fischer as Shultz
- Monty Collins as Alberts
- Carol Tevis as Jones' secretary
- John Kelly as Fred

== Production ==
In April 1937 it was announced that A. Dorian Atvos had completed a screenplay based on the original story by Thomas Ahearn and Walton Butterfield. Lou Brock was picked to produce the film for Universal, with Larry J. Blake in the leading role. John King was also expected to appear in the film. A week later it was announced that Lester Cole would be re-writing the screenplay. In late May, Variety reported that Universal was ready to begin production on the film. On June 26, Don Wilson, who was the announcer for The Jack Benny Program, was added to the cast in a primary role. Harrison's Reports, in their forecast for the 1937-38 films, were not kind to the upcoming film. Even though they thought highly of the producer, Brock, they felt that the story was so weak that the project should be abandoned. Calling the plot "inane", they considered it run of the mill, with nothing novel, and no human interest.

William Gargan was selected as the male lead by the end of June, and it was revealed that Sidney Salkow would helm the picture. Universal announced on July 3 that the start of production on the project was imminent. Shortly after, it was announced that Irene Hervey had been signed to a contract by Universal, and that her first project would be the lead in this film. In early July it was revealed that Brock had cast Judith Barrett as the female romantic lead for the film. The picture began filming on July 6. Shortly after, on July 7, Sterling Holloway was added to the cast. That same week it was revealed that William Davidson and Gerald Oliver Smith had joined the cast.

In mid-July, Deane Janis was flown in to record the film's theme song, "Behind the Mike". Around the same time it was revealed that Jimmy McHugh (music) and Harold Adamson (lyrics) were writing "Once You're In Love" for the picture, while Harold Adamson wrote "Crunchie Munchies". Roy Atwell, Spencer Charters, Grady Sutton, and Jerry Mandy were added to the cast in July, followed shortly by Harlan Briggs and Charles Brokaw. In early August, Universal announced that the film would be released on September 19, however by August 17 the release date had been pushed back to September 26.

Universal, believing they were making up a fictitious station, used the call sign "WBAM". However, those call letters were actually a station belonging to WOR, and used on one of their broadcast relay transmitters.

== Reception ==
The Film Daily gave the film a good review, enjoying the comic gags scattered throughout the production. They enjoyed the pacing and action, while they felt the storyline was a bit weak. They complimented the work of Gargan, Barrett, Wilson, and Holloway, as well as the directing of Salkow. Harrison's Reports was much less kind. They had not liked the premise of the film when they had reviewed it pre-production, and their review echoed those earlier sentiments. They felt the script was "trite", and the action "silly", although they did compliment the work of the actors. Their final grade was "fair to poor". Motion Picture Daily did not give the film a warm review, stating that it was more of the "quantity rather quality" mode, as well as also noting the weakness of the script.
