= Stormy Monday Blues =

Jazz song first recorded by Earl Hines with Billy Ekstine in 1942

Single by Earl Hines
- B-side: "Second Balcony Jump"
- Released: 1942
- Recorded: March 19, 1942
- Genre: Jazz
- Length: 3:11
- Label: Bluebird
- Songwriters: Earl Hines, Billy Eckstine, Bob Crowder

"Stormy Monday Blues" is a jazz song first recorded in 1942 by Earl Hines and His Orchestra with Billy Eckstine on vocals. The song was a hit, reaching number one in Billboard magazine's "Harlem Hit Parade", and was Hines' only appearance in the charts.

== Background ==
"Stormy Monday Blues" is performed in the style of a slow blues that "starts with Hines' piano and a walking bass for the introduction". Billy Eckstine then enters with the vocal:

It's gone and started rainin', I'm as lonesome as a man can be
It's gone and started rainin', I'm as lonesome as a man can be
'Cause every time it rains, I realize what you mean to me

The lyrics "stormy" or "Monday" do not appear in the song. A trumpet solo by Maurice "Shorty" McConnell with big band backing is featured in the second half of the song. Eckstine later recorded "Stormy Monday Blues" in 1959 with Count Basie for their Basie/Eckstine Incorporated album.

The song has sometimes been confused with T-Bone Walker's 1947 song "Call It Stormy Monday (But Tuesday Is Just as Bad)", which is frequently shortened to "Stormy Monday" or "Stormy Monday Blues".

== See also ==
- List of number-one R&B singles of 1942 (U.S.)
