= Senior Soul =

1972 studio album by Billy Eckstine

Studio album by Billy Eckstine
- Released: 1972
- Recorded: 1972
- Genre: Soul, Funk
- Label: Enterprise ENS 5004
- Producer: Billy Eckstine

Billy Eckstine chronology
Moment (1971)	Senior Soul (1972)	If She Walked Into My Life (1974)

Senior Soul is a 1972 studio album by the American singer Billy Eckstine. The album was Eckstine's third for Stax Records's subsidiary Enterprise.

== Reception ==
In an AllMusic review of a combined reissue of the album with If She Walked into My Life, John Bush wrote that the album "...combines the sweet Southern tilt to Memphis soul listeners expect from Stax with one of the leading proto-soul stars. Though Eckstine's rich vibrato tones were both out of fashion and much more difficult to accomplish as he neared 60, there are several solid tracks here..." Bush also praised Eckstine's "wonderfully smooth sensibilities". Eckstine's biographer, Cary Ginell, described his versions of "I Believe in Music" and "When Something Is Wrong With My Baby" as making Eckstine "...seem even more out of place than before".

== Track listing ==
1. "I'll Always Have Faith in You" (Eddie Floyd, Alvertis Isbell) – 4:07
2. "A Man Who Sings" (Richard Landis) – 3:15
3. "A Song for You" (Leon Russell) – 4:36
4. "Thank You for the Moment" (Landis) – 4:01
5. "Please Send Me Someone to Love" (Percy Mayfield) – 4:08
6. "Today Was Tomorrow Yesterday" (Mack Rice) – 4:21
7. "Don't Lose Faith in Me Lord" (Rice) – 3:13
8. "I Believe in Music" (Mac Davis) – 3:15
9. "Living Like a Gypsy" (Landis) – 2:41
10. "When Something Is Wrong With My Baby" (Isaac Hayes, David Porter) – 5:23

== Personnel ==
- Billy Eckstine – vocals, producer, vocal arranger
- Artie Butler – arranger, vocal arranger
- Artie Butler, Billy Eckstine
- David Krieger – art direction
- Sherlie Matthews Singers – backing vocals
- Larry Shaw, Ron Gorden – creative direction
- Ami Hadani, Nye Morton, Terry Manning – engineer
- Dave Purple – remix engineer
- Joel Brodsky, Peter C. Borsari – photography
