= The Cattleman =

Steakhouse restaurant in New York City

- Industry: Steakhouse
- Founded: 1959; 67 years ago
- Defunct: c. 1989
- Headquarters: Manhattan, New York City
- Key people: Larry Ellman (owner)

The Cattleman was a steakhouse in New York City founded in 1959 by restaurateur Larry Ellman. During its heyday, The Cattleman attracted media attention as an early example of a theme restaurant, and it became the inspirational basis for the musical Pump Boys and Dinettes.

== History ==
In his twenties, Larry Ellman became the New York distributor for Automatique, a Danish firm that manufactured Wittenborg brand food-vending machines "similar in appearance and operation to the Automat." Proceeds from the sale of his business enabled him to pursue his first restaurant venture. The Cattleman opened at Lexington Avenue and East 47th Street in Manhattan, New York City, in 1959, with sales reaching $450,000 that year. By 1967, The Cattleman had relocated to 5 East 45th Street (the Fred F. French Building at 551 Fifth Avenue), with sales of over $4,000,000 a year at the 400-seat restaurant.

By 1972 at the latest, Ellman had additionally opened The Cattleman West at 154 West 51st Street, at Seventh Avenue. The restaurants closed circa 1989.

Starting in 1961, Ellman introduced sing-along sessions every evening from 9 p.m. until 2 a.m., led by Bill Farrell. As The New York Times described in 1967:

The sing-along trend ... has acquired a new cabaret convert. It is the Cattleman, at Lexington Avenue and Forty-seventh Street, a restaurant and saloon designed to create the atmosphere of nineteenth-century San Francisco. According to its owner, Larry Ellman, the nightly sing-along sessions have created a 20 percent increase in business. ... Every evening from 9 o'clock to 2 A.M., Mr. Farrell, a night-club entertainer for thirty years, sits at the piano in a dimly lit corner ... and tries to whip the customers into a singing frame of mind. ... The customers who sit at cozily grouped tables and order their steaks and drinks from waiters wearing colored vests, string ties and garters on their sleeves can stare at a large painting of a nude that hangs on one wall, or guess the age and authenticity of the rifles and longhorns that decorate the long, mirrored bar.

In 1964, publisher James Warren held the launch party for Creepy, the first horror-comics magazine of Warren Publishing, at The Cattleman. By at least 1968, the restaurant offered "free stagecoach rides around the city" on Saturday and Sunday from 5 to 9:30 p.m.

A history of New York dining, On the Town in New York (1998), called the restaurant a "riotously successful steakhouse". In 1961, The Theatre magazine said it was "one of the best dining emporiums in New York."

Ellman announced in 1997 that he and partners Edward Buyes and William Opper planned to recreate The Cattleman at 1241 Mamaroneck Avenue in White Plains, New York, in November of that year.

Ellman's son, Kevin Ellman, played drums and percussion in singer-songwriter Todd Rundgren's 1973-1986 band Utopia, leaving it in 1975.

== In media ==
In 1967, Grosset & Dunlap published the cookbook The Cattleman's Steak Book: Best Beef Recipes, a collaboration of the staff of Cattleman Restaurant, food writer Carol Truax, and writer S. Omar Barker. Ellman wrote the foreword. Playboy magazine printed the recipe for a house cocktail, the Cattleman's Cooler, "[f]rom the Cattleman, a Manhattan dining spot that calls itself an adult Western restaurant."

The musical Pump Boys and Dinettes (1981) was created by two friends who worked at The Cattleman, dramatizing their experiences there. It started as a two-man act there, and then expanded. As Jim Wann, the show's principal author and composer recalled in 2010,

I was a scuffling songwriter/guitarist and Mark Hardwick was a piano player/actor. ... Mark and I were unemployed and happy to take a job playing five nights a week in the Cattleman Lounge, attached to a restaurant on one of the darker blocks west of Grand Central. Our mission was to play country standards to entertain the "tired businessman" who had come for the drinks, the steaks, and the waitresses in classic Western saloon girl attire. On slow nights we'd play original songs I was writing for Mark's emerging comic persona.... Mark came in one night wearing a matching dark blue twill shirt and trouser outfit [and] I went out and bought one just like it. By and by we had oval patches over the pockets with our names in them. ... So we became guys who worked at the gas station. ... Our imaginations were taking over and our Pump Boys repertoire began to grow. The Cattleman management soon grew tired of this nonsense and showed us the saloon door.

The restaurant was known for the radio slogan "Where you can get your steak rare and entertainment well done."

The 1966 remake of the Western film Stagecoach did part of its publicity at The Cattleman, photographing some of its stars atop a stagecoach there.

A passage in Rupert Holmes' novel Where the Truth Lies involves the restaurant: "In Manhattan, theme restaurants were blooming like plastic flowers in winter. ... The Cattleman had set the stage, or rather the stagecoach, for such funhouse eateries, supposedly patterned after a Kansas City steer palace. ..."
