= Prisoners of Love =

Prisoners of Love may refer to:

== Film and television ==
- Prisoners of Love (1921 film), an American silent film starring Betty Compson
- Prisoners of Love (1954 film), a West German film
- Prisoners of Love, a fictional play in the 1967 film The Producers and its adaptations
- "Prisoners of Love" (Adventure Time), a 2010 TV episode
- "Prisoners of Love" (Danny Phantom), a 2004 TV episode
- "Prisoners of Love" (True Colors), a 1991 TV episode

== Other media ==
- Prisoners of Love: A Smattering of Scintillating Senescent Songs: 1985–2003, a 2005 album by Yo La Tengo
- "Prisoners of Love", a 1930 short story by Dorothy Black

== See also ==
- Prisoner of Love (disambiguation)
