= Camel Caravan =

Musical variety radio program (1933–1954)

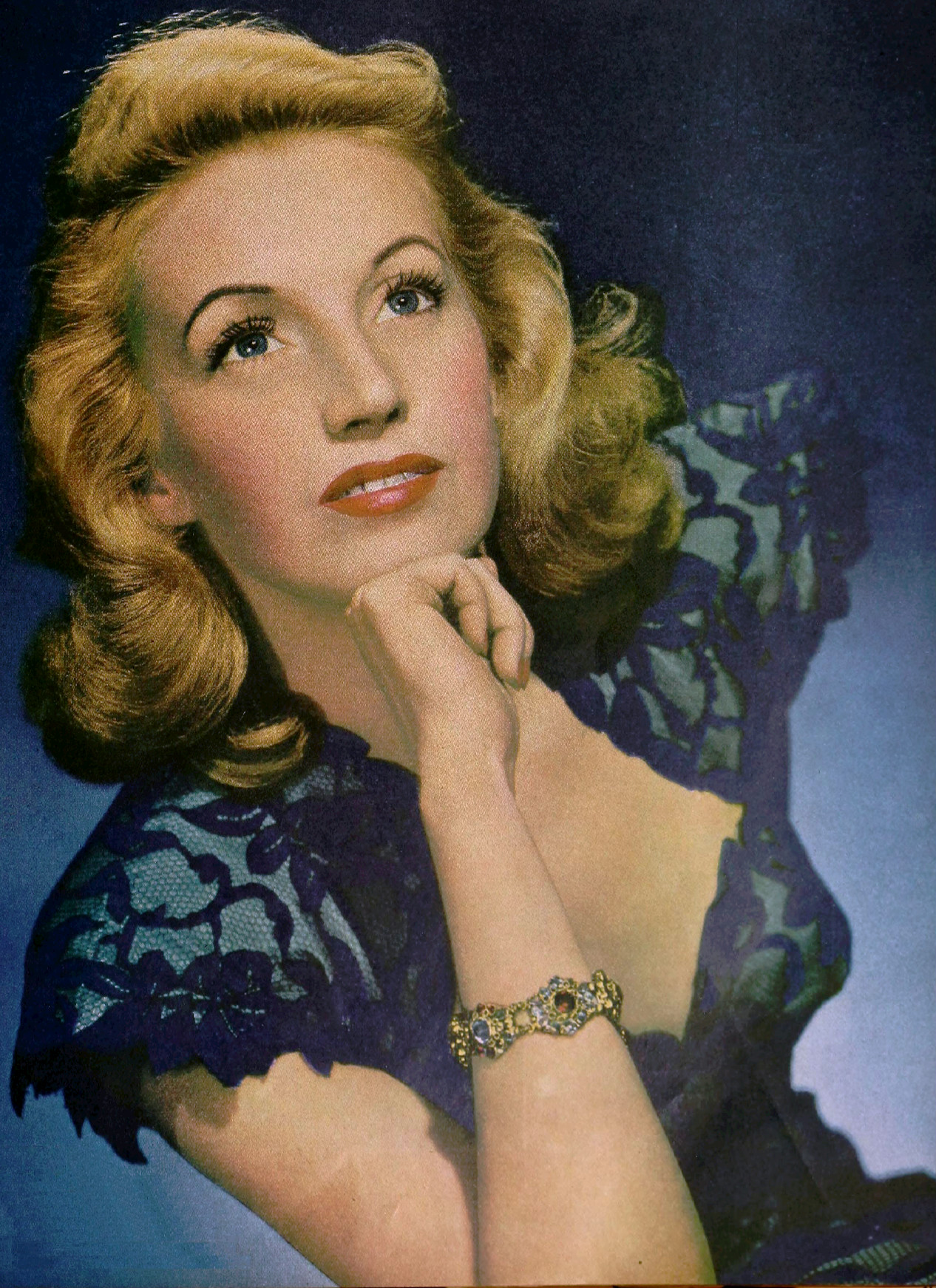
Martha Tilton, seen here on the cover of Radio Mirror (April 1946), was heard on Camel Caravan from 1936 to 1939.

Camel Caravan was a musical variety radio program, sponsored by Camel cigarettes, that aired on NBC Radio and CBS Radio from 1933 to 1954. Various vocalists, musicians and comedy acts were heard during the 21 years this show was on the air, including such talents as Benny Goodman, Georgia Gibbs, Anita O'Day and Vaughn Monroe.

It debuted December 7, 1933, on CBS as a showcase for Glen Gray and the Casa Loma Orchestra. Deane Janis was the vocalist and Walter O'Keefe supplied the comedy along with Stoopnagle and Budd. Broadcast on Tuesdays and Thursdays, it continued until June 25, 1936.

On June 30, 1936, the show was reformatted, featuring Nathaniel Shilkret and his orchestra and Benny Goodman and his swing band, with novelist Rupert Hughes as Master of Ceremonies and vocalists Martha Tilton and Johnny Mercer. A Los Angeles Times picture caption notes that Gladys Swarthout was the guest artist on the initial broadcast. Shilkret left the show on September 22, 1936.

Jack Oakie's College was added to the hour on December 29, 1936. While this aired on Tuesdays on CBS until June 20, 1939, another Benny Goodman Camel Caravan (often subtitled The Camel Hot Club) was heard Saturdays on NBC during 1939. Eddie Cantor starred in another CBS Camel Caravan broadcast from March 28, 1938, to June 26, 1939.

The CBS show was taken over by Bob Crosby on June 27, 1939.

Others who starred on this series during the years were Xavier Cugat and his Orchestra, comedian Herb Shriner, Abbott and Costello, Jimmy Durante and Garry Moore (when it was known as Camel Comedy Caravan), Jack Carson, Mel Blanc, and Bob Hawk (emcee of the quiz program Thanks to the Yanks, later known as The Bob Hawk Show).

== Listen to ==
- Camel Caravan in the Internet Archive's Old-Time Radio Collection
