= The Prime of My Life =

Studio album by Billy Eckstine
- Released: November 6, 1965
- Recorded: 1965
- Genre: Traditional pop, jazz
- Label: Motown
- Producer: William "Mickey" Stevenson

Billy Eckstine chronology
The Modern Sound of Mr. B (1964)	The Prime of My Life (1965)	My Way (1965)

Professional ratings
Review scores
Source	Rating
Record Mirror	4/5 stars

The Prime of My Life is a 1965 studio album by the American singer Billy Eckstine. It was produced by William "Mickey" Stevenson, and was the first of three albums that Eckstine recorded for Motown Records.

== Track listing ==
1. "The Prime of My Life" (Jacques, Ron Miller)
2. "Maybe Today" (Anderson, Broadnax, Miller, Vandenberg)
3. "Who Can I Turn To?" (Leslie Bricusse, Anthony Newley)
4. "As Long as She Needs Me" (Lionel Bart)
5. "Down to Earth" (Miller, O'Malley, Vandenberg)
6. "Feeling Good" (Eger, Yellon)
7. "Had You Been Around" (Jaques, Miller, Vandenberg, Yuffy)
8. "Love Is Gone" (Hunter, Stevenson)
9. "Just Loving You" (Allen, Stevenson)
10. "Climb Ev'ry Mountain" (Rodgers, Hammerstein)
11. "Fantasy" (Hunter, Stevenson)
12. "This Is All I Ask" (Gordon Jenkins)

== Personnel ==
- Billy Eckstine – vocals
- William "Mickey" Stevenson – producer
