= Miss Smith to You! =

Studio album by Lavay Smith & Her Red Hot Skillet Lickers
- Released: September 22, 2009
- Genre: Jazz, blues, big band
- Length: 55:42
- Label: Fat Note Records
- Producer: Lavay Smith, Chris Siebert

Lavay Smith & Her Red Hot Skillet Lickers chronology
Everybody's Talkin' 'bout Miss Thing! (2000)	Miss Smith to You! (2009)

Miss Smith To You! is the third album by Lavay Smith & Her Red Hot Skillet Lickers. The album has nine covers of music from the 1930s to the 1950s, plus three original tunes written by bandleader Lavay Smith and pianist and arranger Chris Seibert.

== Track listing ==
No.	Title	Writer(s)	Length
1.	"Miss Brown to You"	Leo Robin, Richard A. Whiting, Ralph Rainger	2:58
2.	"It Don't Mean a Thing (If It Ain't Got That Swing)"	Duke Ellington, Irving Mills	3:38
3.	"Daddy"	Chris Seibert, Lavay Smith	4:39
4.	"With My Man"	C. Seibert, L. Smith	6:36
5.	"I'm Not Evil"	C. Seibert, L. Smith	3:23
6.	"'Deed I Do"	Walter Hirsch, Fred Rose	2:54
7.	"I Ain't Got Nothin' but the Blues"	D. Ellington, Don George	5:52
8.	"Boogie Woogie (I May Be Wrong)"	Count Basie, James Rushing	5:06
9.	"On the Sunny Side of the Street"	Jimmy McHugh, Dorothy Fields	4:21
10.	"Need a Little Sugar In My Bowl"	Clarence Williams, J.T. Brymn, Dally Small	6:17
11.	"Jumpin' in the Morning"	Ray Charles	4:13
12.	"When the Saints Go Marching In"	Traditional	5:45
Total length:			55:42

== Personnel ==
Lavay Smith & Her Red Hot Skillet Lickers

- Lavay Smith – vocals
- Chris Seibert – piano
- Bill Ortiz – trumpets
- Mike Olmos – trumpets (tracks 1, 2, 5 - 11)
- Allen Smith – trumpets (tracks 3, 4, 12)
- Danny Armstrong – vocals (track 8, 9, 11, 12), trombone
- Charles McNeal - alto saxophone
- Jules Broussard – alto saxophone (tracks 9, 10)
- Howard Wiley – tenor saxophone (tracks 1, 2, 5 - 11)
- Ron Stallings – tenor saxophone (tracks 3, 4, 12)
- Pete Cornell – baritone saxophone (tracks 1, 2, 5 - 11)
- David Ewell – string bass (tracks 1, 2, 5 - 11)
- Marcus Shelby – string bass (tracks 3, 4, 12)
- Darrell Green – drums

Production

- Lavay Smith - producer
- Chris Seibert – producer, mixing
- Jeff Cressman – recorded at Bay Records
- James Frazer - assistant engineer, additional recording
- Dan Feiszli - mixing at What's for Lunch Studios
- Ken Lee - mastering
- Kathrin Miller – cover photography, album design
