= Everybody's Talkin' 'bout Miss Thing! =

Everybody's Talkin' 'Bout Miss Thing!

Studio album by Lavay Smith & Her Red Hot Skillet Lickers
- Released: March 21, 2000
- Recorded: April 7, 1999 (tracks 4, 11, 12, 15); May 27, 1999 (tracks 5, 6, 13, 14, 16); August 12, 1999 (tracks 1, 9, 10); August 25, 1999 (tracks 2, 3, 7, 8)
- Genre: Bebop, swing, salsa, jump blues, New Orleans R&B
- Length: 1:08:16
- Label: Fat Note Records
- Producer: Lavay Smith, Chris Siebert

Lavay Smith & Her Red Hot Skillet Lickers chronology
One Hour Mama (1996)	Everybody's Talkin' 'Bout Miss Thing! (2000)	Miss Smith to You! (2009)

Everybody's Talkin' 'Bout Miss Thing! is the second album by Lavay Smith & Her Red Hot Skillet Lickers.

== Development ==
The band worked with David Berger (former director of the Lincoln Center Jazz Orchestra) on the new album. The album differed from One Hour Mama with the addition of six additional horns, and included six original tunes along with the ten covers.

== Track listing ==
No.	Title	Writer(s)	Length
1.	"The Busy Woman's Blues"	David Berger, Chris Seibert, Lavay Smith, Bill Stewart	6:12
2.	"Everybody's Talkin' 'Bout Miss Thing"	D. Berger, C. Seibert, L. Smith	3:11
3.	"Big Fine Daddy"	Bill Elliot, C. Seibert, L. Smith	4:06
4.	"Gee, Baby, Ain't I Good to You?"	Don Redman, Andy Razaf	5:06
5.	"Now or Never"	Billie Holiday, Curtis R. Lewis	3:46
6.	"I've Got a Feelin'"	Sid Wyche	3:41
7.	"Roll the Boogie"	C. Seibert, L. Smith	3:59
8.	"Honey Pie"	C. Seibert, Allen Smith, L. Smith	4:10
9.	"I Want a Little Boy"	Billy Moll, Murray Mencher	6:10
10.	"Blow Me a Fat Note"	C. Seibert, L. Smith	3:25
11.	"Voo-It"	Ulysses Banks, William "Frosty" Pyles	5:06
12.	"He Beeped When He Should Have Bopped"	Dizzy Gillespie	3:32
13.	"Hootie Blues"	Jay McShann, George Brown	4:06
14.	"Do You Know What It Means to Miss New Orleans?"	Lou Alter, Eddie DeLange	5:15
15.	"Sent for You Yesterday"	Eddie Durham, Jimmy Rushing	4:11
16.	"Winter Wonderland"	Richard Smith, Felix Bernard	2:20
Total length:			1:08:16

== Reception ==
JazzTimes reported the album to be hot, with all-attitude Smith never failing when working with her backing band. "The Busy Woman's Blues" is reviewed as a mid-tempo smolder-fest. Roberta on the Arts reviewed the album as red hot, visiting the jazz and blues of San Francisco, Kansas City, New York, and New Orleans. Lavay Smith is the vocalist star and is ably backed by her thirteen piece band to create versatile and melodic tunes. The Los Angeles Times reports that Lavay Smith & Her Red Hot Skillet Lickers are not just another swing revival band, but a band making real swing music, jump blues, bebop, New Orleans R&B, and classic jazz. Smith's style harks back to Dinah Washington, using a smoky contralto to dig into the music's timeless essence.

The album is reported to have reached at number 10 on the Billboard's Top Jazz Albums chart, and can be shown to have reached at least number 11 on Billboard's Top Jazz Albums chart, on July 1 and July 8, 2000, and number 24 on Billboard's combined Jazz Albums chart on July 1, 2000. Billboard ranked the album as the 25th top jazz album of the year for 2000.

== Personnel ==
Lavay Smith & Her Red Hot Skillet Lickers

- Lavay Smith – vocals
- Chris Seibert – piano
- Charlie Seibert – guitar
- Bing Nathan – string bass
- Bill Ortiz – trumpets
- Allen Smith – trumpets (except tracks 5 & 13)
- Danny Armstrong – trombone (except tracks 2, 3, 7, 8)
- Marty Wehner – trombone (tracks 2, 3, 7, 8)
- Jules Broussard – alto saxophone (tracks 2–5, 7, 8, 11, 12, 15), tenor saxophone (1, 6, 9, 10, 13, 14, 16)
- Bill Stewart – alto saxophone (tracks 1, 5, 6, 9, 10, 13, 14, 16)
- Herman Riley – tenor saxophone (tracks 4, 11, 12, 15)
- Ron Stallings – tenor saxophone (track 5), baritone saxophone (except track 5)
- Harvey Robb – tenor saxophone (tracks 2, 3, 7, 8)
- Sly Randolph – drums (tracks 2, 3, 4, 7, 8, 11, 12, 15)
- Mark Lee – drums (tracks 1, 5, 6, 9, 10, 13, 14, 16)
- Jesús Diaz – bongos (tracks 6, 16)
- Michael Spiro – congas (tracks 6, 16)

Production

- Lavay Smith – producer
- Chris Seibert – producer, mixing
- Mike Cogan – recorded at Bay Records
- Dug Nichols, Daryn Roven – recorded at Russian Hill Recording and Different Fur Recording, mixing
- Jeremy Goody – assistant engineer
- Justin Lieberman – assistant engineer, mixing
- Paul Stubblebine – mastering
- Kathrin Miller – cover photography
- John Borruso – design and artwork
