= Pump Boys and Dinettes =

1981 musical

- Music: John Foley; Mark Hardwick; Debra Monk; Cass Morgan; John Schimmel; Jim Wann
- Lyrics: John Foley; Mark Hardwick; Debra Monk; Cass Morgan; John Schimmel; Jim Wann
- Book: John Foley; Mark Hardwick; Debra Monk; Cass Morgan; John Schimmel; Jim Wann
- Productions: 1981 Off-Broadway; 1982 Broadway; 1984 West End

Pump Boys and Dinettes is a musical written by a performance group also called Pump Boys and Dinettes, which consists of John Foley, Mark Hardwick, Debra Monk, Cass Morgan, John Schimmel and Jim Wann. The members directed and starred in the Broadway production.

== History ==
The musical was created by two friends who worked at The Cattleman restaurant in New York City, dramatizing their experiences there. It started as a two-man act and then expanded. As Jim Wann, the show's principal author and composer recalled in 2010,

I was a scuffling songwriter/guitarist and Mark Hardwick was a piano player/actor.... Mark and I were unemployed and happy to take a job playing five nights a week in the Cattleman Lounge, attached to a restaurant on one of the darker blocks west of Grand Central. Our mission was to play country standards to entertain the "tired businessman" who had come for the drinks, the steaks, and the waitresses in classic Western saloon girl attire. On slow nights we'd play original songs I was writing for Mark's emerging comic persona.... Mark came in one night wearing a matching dark blue twill shirt and trouser outfit [and] I went out and bought one just like it. By and by we had oval patches over the pockets with our names in them.... So we became guys who worked at the gas station. ... Our imaginations were taking over and our Pump Boys repertoire began to grow. The Cattleman management soon grew tired of this nonsense and showed us the saloon door.

== Productions ==
The musical premiered on Broadway on February 4, 1982, at the Princess Theatre and closed on June 18, 1983, after 573 performances. The cast featured Debra Monk, Cass Morgan, John Foley, Mark Hardwick, John Schimmel and Jim Wann. It had premiered at the Chelsea West Side Arts Theatre on July 10, 1981, moving to the Colonnades Theatre (Greenwich Village) in October 1981. Replacements through the show included Loudon Wainwright III and Tom Chapin, who both took over the role of "Jim" (originally played by Jim Wann).

The show played in London's West End at the Piccadilly Theatre from September 20, 1984, to June 8, 1985, and transferred to the Albery Theatre from June 11, 1985, to September 2, 1985. The production starred, amongst others, Paul Jones, Clodagh Rodgers, Joe Brown, Brian Protheroe, Carlene Carter and Kiki Dee.

The show played for many years in Chicago at the Apollo Theater on Lincoln Avenue.

A 1983 touring version of the show featured former pop star Nicolette Larson. Larson's performance in the show was well-received, and it began a brief foray into country music for her.

On July 16–19, 2014, the show was revived for five performances at New York City Center as part of the Encores! Off-Center program. The cast featured Hunter Foster, Mamie Parris, Randy Redd, Katie Thompson and Jordan Dean.

On July 22, 2018, the original cast (save Mark Hardwick, who died in 1991) performed two full-score concert versions of the show at Feinstein's/54 Below in Manhattan.

The musical tells the story of four men (L.M., Jackson, Jim and Eddie) who work at a gas station and two waitresses (sisters Prudie and Rhetta Cupp) at the Double Cupp Diner, located somewhere between Frog Level and Smyrna, North Carolina. The music is mostly from the country rock/pop music genres. They perform on guitars, piano, bass and kitchen utensils.

The original cast album was released by CBS Records in the U.S. Its recording of "The Night Dolly Parton Was Almost Mine" reached number 67 on the Hot Country Songs charts.

In 2021, Porchlight Music Theatre premiered a new song written by Jim Wann for this Chicago production, "Surf Castin' Man." Porchlight's production was directed by Daryl Brooks, music directed by Robert Reddrick and choreographed by Rueben D. Echoles. "Surf Castin' Man" was performed by Frederick Harris with the cast that also included Rafe Bradford, Shantel Cribbs, Ian Paul Custer, Melanie Loren and Billy Rude.

== Other media ==
Pump Boys and Dinettes on Television was a pilot episode for a series adaptation of the show featuring the Broadway cast and appearances by Ron Carey and Tanya Tucker. It aired on NBC on August 15, 1983, but a series was never ordered.

== Plot ==
=== Act One ===
The story takes place on an unspecified "Highway 57" on the outskirts of Frog Level, a rural community somewhere in the southeastern United States ("in Grand Ole Opry country" according to the official summary), at two adjacent locations: the Pump Boys service station and general store co-owned by Jim and L.M., and the Double Cupp, a diner operated by sisters Prudie and Rhetta Cupp ("Highway 57"). Jim's Uncle Bob calls the gas station to inquire about when his Winnebago will be fixed, and Jim stalls him by saying it takes time and extra care to do the job right ("Takin' It Slow"). Jim talks about the ladies that swing through the area, noting that his employee Jackson chases them, Eddie (a friend of the pump boys who hangs out at the station while his Edsel is being fixed) once lured a wealthy actress, but L.M., the station bookkeeper, draws the most attention, which L.M. doesn't even want ("Serve Yourself").

At the Double Cupp, Rhetta advertises the diner's menu ("Menu Song"). Prudie talks about how the male-to-female ratio in the area plays in her favor, and that although Eddie comes close to her ideal, his being from the nearby "inbred" town of Smyrna is a deal-breaker, and her real soulmate is in the audience ("Best Man"). Jim talks about how he forgot he had promised to take Rhetta to a minor league baseball game when he chose to go fishing instead ("Fisherman's Prayer"/"Catfish"). Jim recalls his late grandmother ("Mamaw"). Jim takes one of the catfish from his fishing trip to Rhetta to cook, but Rhetta is still jilted and tells him off ("Be Good or Be Gone"), to which Jim tries to make good by offering her a silk artificial rose and to clean up his truck if she accepts another date at a nearby bar ("Drinkin' Shoes").

=== Act Two ===
After intermission, the Pump Boys advertise their gas station's services and goods ("Pump Boys"). Jackson talks about what he does on the weekends, when he goes into town, where he has a crush on a cashier at Woolworth's ("Mona"). Jim and Jackson recall an exceptionally dry and troublesome summer the previous year, when anything that could go wrong did, which segues into a story about how L.M. met Dolly Parton backstage after a concert and had a brief fling before he cut off the affair due to extenuating circumstances ("The Night Dolly Parton Was Almost Mine").

At the Double Cupp, Rhetta and Prudie sing about wanting tips from their customers ("Tips") before reflecting on their childhood under an absent single mother, lamenting the emotional distance between each other ("Sisters"), then decide to shut down the diner for a time and take a trip ("I Need a Vacation"). The pump boys and Cupp sisters all head on a road trip to Florida in Bob's miraculously fixed Winnebago ("No Holds Barred"), where L.M. now relishes in the attention of the ogling "brown" onlookers ("Farmer Tan"). Bob calls the group, and Jim assures him that they will be returning soon ("Highway 57 (Reprise)"). Upon returning, they close the diner and gas station ("Closing Time").

== Songs ==
Lyrics and music by Jim Wann (unless otherwise noted)

Act I

- Highway 57 — Company
- Taking It Slow (Music and lyrics by John Foley, Mark Hardwick and John Schimmel) — Pump Boys
- Serve Yourself — L.M.
- Menu Song (Music and lyrics by Cass Morgan and Debra Monk) — Dinettes
- The Best Man — Prudie Cupp
- Fisherman's Prayer — Pump Boys
- Caution: Men Cooking (Music and lyrics by Cass Morgan, Debra Monk and John Foley) — Pump Boys (replaced by "Catfish" in all productions after 1983)
- Mamaw — Jim
- Be Good or Be Gone — Rhetta Cupp
- Drinkin' Shoes (Music and lyrics by Cass Morgan, Debra Monk and Mark Hardwick) — Company

Act II

- Pump Boys — Pump Boys
- Mona — Jackson
- T.N.D.P.W.A.M. (The Night Dolly Parton Was Almost Mine) — L.M.
- Tips (Music and lyrics by Cass Morgan and Debra Monk) — Dinettes
- Sister (Music and lyrics by Cass Morgan) — Dinettes
- (I Need a) Vacation — Company
- No Holds Barred (Music and lyrics by Cass Morgan) — Company
- Farmer Tan — L.M. and Dinettes
- Highway 57 (Reprise) — Company
- Closing Time — Company

== Awards and nominations ==
=== Original Broadway production ===
Year	Award	Category	Nominee	Result
1982	Tony Award	Best Musical		Nominated
1982	Drama Desk Award	Outstanding Musical		Nominated
1982	Drama Desk Award	Outstanding Featured Actor in a Musical	Mark Hardwick	Nominated
1982	Drama Desk Award	Outstanding Lyrics	John Foley, Mark Hardwick, Debra Monk, Cass Morgan, John Schimmel and Jim Wann	Nominated
1982	Drama Desk Award	Outstanding Music	John Foley, Mark Hardwick, Debra Monk, Cass Morgan, John Schimmel and Jim Wann	Nominated
