= One Hour Mama =

Studio album by Lavay Smith & Her Red Hot Skillet Lickers
- Released: November 7, 1996
- Recorded: 1995–1996
- Genre: Swing; blues
- Length: 47:57
- Label: Fat Note Records
- Producer: Chris Siebert

Lavay Smith & Her Red Hot Skillet Lickers chronology
One Hour Mama (1996)	Everybody's Talkin' 'bout Miss Thing! (2000)

One Hour Mama is the first album by Lavay Smith & Her Red Hot Skillet Lickers. The album was recorded at Bay Records, Berkeley, California.

== Track listing ==
No.	Title	Writer(s)	Length
1.	"Oo Poppa Do"	Eddie Singleton	3:13
2.	"Blue Skies"	Irving Berlin	3:50
3.	"New Blowtop Blues"	Leonard Feather, Jane Feather	6:25
4.	"What's the Matter With You"	Albina Jones	4:01
5.	"Squeeze Me"	Fats Waller, Andy Razaf, Clarence Williams	4:37
6.	"And Her Tears Flowed Like Wine"	Charles Lawrence, Stan Kenton, Joe Greene	2:48
7.	"Going to Chicago Blues"	Count Basie, James Rushing	4:58
8.	"Between the Devil and the Deep Blue Sea"	Harold Arlen, Ted Koehler	3:12
9.	"Downhearted Blues"	Alberta Hunter, Lovie Austin	5:23
10.	"Walk Right In, Walk Right Out ("The Walking Blues")"	Jesse Powell	4:08
11.	"One Hour Mama"	Ida Cox	5:22
Total length:			47:57

== Personnel ==
Lavay Smith & Her Red Hot Skillet Lickers

- Lavay Smith – vocals
- Chris Seibert – piano, arranger
- Charlie Seibert – guitar
- Larry Leight – trombone
- Bing Nathan – string bass
- Dan Foltz – drums
- Bill Stewart – alto saxophone (tracks 3 - 11), tenor saxophone (tracks 1 - 3)
- Harvey Robb – alto saxophone (tracks 1, 2), tenor saxophone (tracks 4 - 10), clarinet (track 11)
- Noel Jewkes – tenor saxophone (tracks 2, 4, 10), baritone saxophone (tracks 1, 3, 7), clarinet (tracks 2, 5, 9)

Production

- Chris Seibert – production, mixing
- Mike Cogan – engineer, mixing
- Bing Nathan – mixing
- Katherine Miller – cover photography
- Greg Reeves – design and artwork
