= Midnight Flyer (song) =

Single by Nat King Cole
- B-side: "Sweet Bird of Youth"
- Released: July 24, 1959
- Recorded: 1959
- Genre: Pop; R&B
- Length: 2:16
- Label: Capitol
- Songwriter(s): Mayme Watts; Robert Mosely

Nat King Cole singles chronology
"You Made Me Love You" (1958)	"Midnight Flyer" (1959)	"Time and the River" (1960)

"Midnight Flyer" is a popular song written by Mayme Watts and Robert Mosely. It was recorded in 1959 by Nat King Cole, peaking at number 12 on the Billboard R&B chart and number 23 on the UK Singles Chart.

== Chart position ==
Chart (1959)	Peak position
US Billboard Hot 100	51
US Hot R&B Sides	12
UK Singles (OCC)	23
