= Timeless Billy Eckstine =

Timeless is a 2005 album featuring the music of Billy Eckstine. The album was released by Savoy Records. It was also reissued in 2006 under the title Prisoner of Love: The Romantic Billy Eckstine.

== Track listing ==
1. "I Love the Rhythm In a Riff"
2. "Sophisticated Lady"
3. "She's Got the Blues for Sale"
4. "Jelly, Jelly"
5. "Lonesome Lover Blues"
6. "Tell Me, Pretty Baby"
7. "Without a Song"
8. "Cool Breeze"
9. "Serenade In Blue"
10. "Oop Bop Sh'Bam"
11. "In the Still of the Night"
12. "In My Solitude"
13. "It Ain't Like That"
14. "Prisoner of Love"
15. "Second Balcony Jump"
