= Richard Himber =

- Also known as: Dick Himber
- Born: Herbert Richard Imber; February 20, 1899; Newark, New Jersey
- Origin: United States
- Died: December 11, 1966 (aged 67) New York City
- Occupations: bandleader, composer, violinist, magician
- Years active: 1915–1966

Richard Himber (born Herbert Richard Imber; February 20, 1899 – December 11, 1966) was an American bandleader, composer, violinist, magician and practical joker.

== Early life ==
He was born as Herbert Richard Imber in Newark, New Jersey to the owner of a chain of meat stores. His parents gave him violin lessons, but when they found him performing in a seedy Newark dive, they took the instrument away from him and sent him to military school. In 1915, he stole away into New York City, where Sophie Tucker heard him play and hired him as a novelty act to play with her and the Five Kings of Syncopation where Himber was the highlight of the cabaret act.

He worked his way through Vaudeville and down Tin Pan Alley. He managed Rudy Vallee's orchestra service, which sent out bands for private parties and society functions. A suave salesman and irrepressible idea man, he soon had his own band booking agency. In 1932, he acquired the first known "vanity" telephone number, R-HIMBER, answered 24 hours a day. Later that year, Himber finally formed an orchestra of his own, parlaying a gig at New York's Essex House Hotel into national NBC radio exposure. Among the top-notch professionals in its ranks were Benny Goodman, Tommy Dorsey, Artie Shaw and many other future stars of the music world.

== Career ==
In 1933 Richard Himber made his first records, for Vocalion under the name "Dick Himber," which intimates always called him. Among the selections was his own theme song, "It Isn't Fair," a song he wrote which became a hit. In 1934 after a single session for Victor's budget label Bluebird, he began recording for the full-priced Victor label until 1939. He led one of the most sophisticated "sweet" dance bands of the era, featuring Joey Nash as his vocalist (1933–1935), who was replaced by Stuart Allen (1935–1939).

Himber's work on radio included leading the orchestra for Coffee Club, a weekly program on the Mutual Broadcasting System in 1937.

Himber was also a skilled magician, and invented many magic tricks including "The Himber Wallet," "The Himber Ring," and the "Himber Milk Pitcher." In later years, his band act often included an interlude of magic and he conjured on many television shows as well.

Himber was the publisher of the R-H Log, a weekly survey of the most popular tunes on radio and television. To the annoyance of most music publishers, he refused to accept payola. He once ordered his secretary to phone every major publisher and tell them he had a stroke, to which many of them joyfully replied, "It's about time."

Other popular tunes that Himber composed were "Moments in the Moonlight," "After the Rain," "Monday in Manhattan," "Haunting Memories," "Time Will Tell," "Am I Asking Too Much," and "I'm Getting Nowhere Fast with You." In 1957 he wrote a TV theme for NBC's Tonight! America After Dark when Jack Lescoulie was the interim host—before Jack Paar took over.

In the late 1930s Himber's band was featured in short-subject films produced in New York by Paramount Pictures and Himber was also the maestro for New York's annual Harvest Moon Ball.

== Sense of humor ==
Himber took notice of the gimmicks and arrangements used by his fellow bandleaders, and then satirized them. Among swing-music collectors he is known for his 1938 series, "Parade of Bands", a six-sided record set of imitations of then-popular bands and singers, including his former employees Goodman, Dorsey, and Shaw, as well as Guy Lombardo, Larry Clinton, Ted Lewis, Count Basie, and other "name" bandleaders.

Although he is now remembered primarily for his musical legacy, his contemporaries recall his incessant practical joking. The employees of Toots Shor's 51st Street Chophouse in New York City, which he frequented, lived in fear of him, as he constantly engaged in the act of "butter snapping" (artfully placing a pat of butter in the center of a napkin, so that when thrown upward, it would adhere to the ceiling) and "bread crumbing" (rolling bread into hard pellets and tossing them at female restaurant patrons, so that the bread would hit them at the neckline and then descend into their bosom). Famous celebrity victims of Himber's pranks included Ben Blue, the chanteuse Hildegarde and Charles Laughton. At home, Himber would boast of his cooking skills, and when his wife asked for veal cutlets, he breaded the inner sole of a shoe.

Fond of the grand gesture, Himber could be as generous as he was unpredictable. A wearer of brightly patterned sportcoats, he once complained that a friend's coat was too loud and promptly tore out the back seam. Before the astonished friend could object, Himber steered him into a clothier's shop where an exact copy of the coat was waiting - paid for ahead of time by Himber himself. A portly yet youthful-looking man with flaming red hair, Himber frequently lied about his age, giving birth dates of 1902, 1904, 1907, and 1909 at various times. He married only in his forties, to prominent model Nina McDougall, with whom he had a son. Their acrimonious divorce was the talk of New York tabloids a decade later.

Among Himber's novel promotions was a traveling bandstand on a flatbed truck, sponsored by Pepsi-Cola. The orchestra used it for free outdoor concerts in the New York City area in the 1960s. It was during one of these concerts in 1966 that Himber suffered a heart attack, dying several hours later.

== Personal life and death ==
Himber married former New York model Nina E. MacDougall in Denver, Colorado, on July 22, 1943. He died on December 11, 1966, at his home in the Essex House in New York City, aged 59.

== Quotation ==
To be a good practical joker, you need patience and plenty of it, because there's a time and place for everything, and you have to wait for the right moment and remember that vanity rules the world.

== Bibliography ==
- Zolotow, Maurice (1952). It Takes All Kinds. New York: Random House.
- Ed Levy, ed. (1980). Richard Himber: The Man and His Magic. Magico Publishing.
