= Martha Holmes (photographer) =

American photographer (1923–2006)

Martha Holmes Waxman
- Born: February 7, 1923; Louisville, Kentucky
- Died: September 19, 2006 (aged 83); Manhattan
- Education: University of Louisville
- Known for: Photography
- Spouse: Arthur Waxman

Martha Holmes Waxman (7 February 1923 in Louisville, Kentucky – 19 September 2006 in Manhattan, New York City, New York) was an American photographer and photojournalist.

== Life ==
Holmes was born to George and Emma Auer Holmes; her father worked in public relations and her mother was a vocal coach. She was married for 46 years to Arthur Waxman, a theatrical executive and early general manager of the Actors Studio, who died in 1998. At the time of her death, Holmes was survived by their two daughters, Anne Holmes Waxman and Terry Holmes Waxman Koshel, as well as two grandchildren.

== Career ==
Holmes was studying art at the University of Louisville and at the Speed Art Museum when someone suggested working at the Louisville Courier-Journal and The Louisville Times newspapers. She was hired and began as assistant to a color photographer, but soon became a full-time black-and-white photographer when many of the paper's male photographers were called to service in World War II.

In September 1944, Holmes left for Life magazine. She moved to Washington, D.C., in 1947, to be one of Life's three staff photographers there. She covered the House Un-American Activities Committee hearings during the height of the committee's investigations into the entertainment industry and alleged communist propaganda.

After two years in Washington, she returned to New York and lived there for the rest of her life. She continued working for Life, for which she photographed two covers, on a freelance basis and by 1950 was named one of the top 10 female photographers in the nation.

Holmes's photographs were published in People, Redbook, Coronet and Collier's magazines and exhibited worldwide, including at the International Center of Photography, the National Portrait Gallery, and the Louvre in Paris.

== Notable works ==
Her most famous photographs were of Jackson Pollock and Humphrey Bogart and Lauren Bacall. Holmes said about her time at Life, "One thing Life always taught us: They'd say, 'Film is cheap. Use it. Shoot, shoot, shoot.'"
