= Billy Eckstine's Imagination =

Imagination

Studio album by Billy Eckstine
- Released: 1958
- Genre: Jazz
- Label: EmArcy

Billy Eckstine chronology
| Billy Eckstine's Imagination (1958) | Imagination (1958) | Basie and Eckstine, Inc. (1959) |

Professional ratings
Review scores
| Source | Rating |
|---|---|
| The Encyclopedia of Popular Music | 4/5 stars |

Imagination is a 1958 album recorded by Billy Eckstine. It was released under the EmArcy label.

== Track listing ==
1. "It Was So Beautiful" (Arthur Freed, Harry Barris)
2. "I Got a Right to Sing the Blues" (Harold Arlen, Ted Koehler)
3. "Love Is Just around the Corner" (Lewis E. Gensler, Leo Robin)
4. "I Don't Stand a Ghost of a Chance with You" (Victor Young, Ned Washington, Bing Crosby)
5. "A Faded Summer Love" (Phil Baxter)
6. "What a Little Moonlight Can Do" (Harry M. Woods)
7. "Imagination" (Jimmy Van Heusen, Johnny Burke)
8. "Lullaby of the Leaves" (Bernice Petkere, Joe Young)
9. "I Cover the Waterfront" (Johnny Green, Edward Heyman)
10. "I Wished on the Moon" (Ralph Rainger, Dorothy Parker)
11. "That's All" (Alan Brandt, Bob Haymes)
12. "Gigi" (Frederick Loewe, Alan Jay Lerner)
