= Mayme Watts =

American songwriter and R&B singer

- Also known as: Maymie Watts
- Occupations: Songwriter, vocalist
- Labels: Groove, Glory, MGM, Roulette
- Formerly of: Lionel Hampton Orchestra, Mayme & Robert, Walter Davis Jr. Trio

Mayme P. Watts, aka Maymie Watts, was an American songwriter and R&B singer. Watts is best known for co-writing the jazz standard "Alright, Okay, You Win" with Sid Wyche. Watts also co-wrote (with Robert Mosely) the charting songs "Give Me Your Love" and "Midnight Flyer" by Nat King Cole, "Since I Made You Cry" by The Rivieras, "Point of No Return" by Adam Wade, and "Ooh! What a Day!", recorded by both Craig Douglas and Sarah Vaughan.

Watts was a vocalist with the Lionel Hampton Orchestra. She also recorded singles as a solo artist as well as in the duo Mayme & Robert.

In March 1958, Watts married Ralph Sawyer in Germany. In August 1959, Watts filed a lawsuit against former Mercury Records executive Brad Shad, for songwriting royalties she believed were owed to her from “Alright, Okay, You Win”. By the mid-1960s she was performing as a vocalist with the Walter Davis Jr. Trio, and married pianist Walter Davis.

== Discography ==
As Maymie Watts (solo)

- "Quicksand" / "There Goes That Train" (Groove 4G-0103, 1955)
- "Doo Ba Dee" (Track 23, Rockin' the Groove, Bear Family BCD 17412, 2016)
- "Wheel of Time" (Track 35, Rockin' The Groove, Bear Family BCD 17412, 2016)

With Mayme & Robert / Maymie and Robert

- "Ain't No Way in the World" / "Parting Tears" (Glory 45-260, 1957)
- "Sweet Lips" / "Ha Ha Hee Hee Ho Ho Hum Hum" (MGM K12702, 1958)
- "You Ought to Know" / "That's When" (Roulette R-4347, 1961)
