= Deane Janis =

American singer

- Born: Nadeen Andrews; June 19, 1904; Omaha, Nebraska, U.S.
- Died: March 8, 1988 Independence, Missouri, U.S.
- Genres: Jazz; Swing
- Occupations: Singer, actress
- Years active: 1930s–1940s
- Label: Brunswick

Deane Janis (June 19, 1904 – March 8, 1988) was an American popular singer during America's swing era. She is best known for singing on the musical variety radio program Camel Caravan.

== Career ==
Janis was born, Nadeen Andrews, in Omaha, Nebraska to Frank P Andrews and Lena R Andrews. As a young woman she expressed a desire to become an actress or a singer. She sang in the choir while at school. After graduating from high school she visited her aunt in Chicago. During that visit she was noticed by a booking agency which managed to obtain a 15-minute singing engagement for her on a Chicago radio station. Although the reaction to her work was positive, she found the experience so overwhelming that she did not look for more work as a singer at that time. After two years she tried again, and started working as the featured vocalist for Hal Kemp's dance band where she remained for 18 months. In 1933 she signed with CBS to perform on Camel Caravan where she sang with the Casa Loma Orchestra and worked with host, Walter O'Keefe, until the show format was changed in 1936.

In 1935 she appeared in the short film, Roof Tops of Manhattan and in 1937 she appeared in two feature films as a singer, All American Sweetheart and Behind the Mike.

In 1947 while touring in Korea with the USO she survived an accident which broke her back. For the rest of her career she gave up show business and worked at the Trinity Lutheran Hospital in Kansas City, Missouri.

She died on March 8, 1988.
