= Idaho (Jesse Stone song) =

Idaho is a jazz song written by Jesse Stone.

Stone's early writings show a deep blues influence. An early success was "Idaho", recorded by several artists, with the Benny Goodman version peaking at #4 (pop) in 1942. The recording by Guy Lombardo sold three million copies.
