= Bill Farrell (singer) =

American singer (1926–2007)

William Angelo Fiorelli (March 30, 1926 – June 30, 2007), better known as Bill Farrell, was a Cleveland-born recording artist in the 1950s on the MGM, Mercury Records and TEL record labels.

In 1947, Bob Hope was in a night club in Buffalo, New York, and saw Farrell perform. Hope, impressed with Farrell's powerful baritone voice and smooth delivery, invited Farrell to Hollywood. Hope featured him on his weekly radio show with Doris Day and Les Brown and his Orchestra.

MGM released "Shrimp Boats" b/w "Cry" in October 1951 on the 45-rpm disc K11113. This particular 45 rpm was issued shortly after the decision was made to make available 45 rpm records available to the general public, and to discontinue 78 rpm records in favor of the size, weight and packaging.

TEL released "If" b/w "You Were Only Fooling" in late 1951 on the 45 rpm disc C1000. This was (reportedly) the first 45 rpm single released by a division of United Telefilm Records, Inc.

Farrell enjoyed minor hits with his recordings of "Circus" (1949, reached No. 26 on the Billboard charts); "It Isn't Fair" (1950, reached No. 20); and "My Heart Cries for You" (1951, reached No. 18).

Larry Ellman hired Farrell in 1961 to lead sing-along sessions in his restaurant The Cattleman on Lexington Avenue, in New York City, every evening from 9 until 2 a.m. These were successful, and brought a 20% increase in sales for the restaurant in the first few months.

Farrell died on June 30, 2007, at the age of 81, in Rancho Mirage, California.

== Discography ==
- Lush Life (Dobre Records DR1034, 1978)
- Maybe This Time (Dobre Records DR1064, 1978)
- Sings Favorite Concertos (Dobre Records DR1065)
- "Shrimp Boats" / "Cry" (MGM label K11113, 1951)
- "You've Changed" / "And It Still Goes" (MGM label 10519, 1949) 78 rpm
- "Am I Blue?" / "I Cover the Waterfront" (Mercury label, 70779, recorded December 29, 1955)
- "A Man Called Peter" / "Pagliacci" (Esquire Mercury label A-1211) Australian 78 rpm
- "My Heart Cries for You" / "You Love Me" MGM label 10868, 1950)
- "It Isn't Fair" / "Bamboo" (MGM label 10637, 1950)
- "Love Locked Out" / "Don't You Know Or Don't You Care" (MGM label 10840, 1950)
- "Circus" / "Through A Long And Sleepless Night" (MGM label 10488, 1949)
- "Kaw-Liga" / "You Can't Stop Me From Dreaming" (MGM label K11424, 1953)
- "Slippin' and Slidin'" / "Cherry Lips" (Imperial label X7001, 1956)
- "Honky Tonk Song" / "Still In Love With You" (CBS-Epic 9211, 1957)
- "Yeah Yeah" / "Someday (You'll Want Me To Want You)" (Date label, 1958)
