= Alright, Okay, You Win =

Single by Peggy Lee
- B-side: "My Man"
- Released: December 1958
- Genre: Jazz
- Length: 2:51
- Label: Capitol
- Songwriter(s): Sid Wyche; Mayme Watts

Peggy Lee singles chronology
"Sweetheart" (1958)	"Alright, Okay, You Win" (1958)	"My Man" (1959)

"Alright, Okay, You Win" is a jazz standard written by Sid Wyche (music) and Mayme Watts (lyrics). It was first recorded in 1955 by several artists including Ella Johnson, The Modernaires, Bill Farrell, and Count Basie, but failed to chart nationally. Peggy Lee's 1958 recording (Capitol 45-19202) reached number 68 on the Billboard Hot 100 list. It has since become a jazz standard, which has been recorded by numerous artists.

Paul McCartney can be heard singing some lyrics from it as he prepares to record a take of the song "You Never Give Me Your Money". The recording is featured on the 50th Anniversary Edition of Abbey Road.
