= Lavay Smith =

American singer

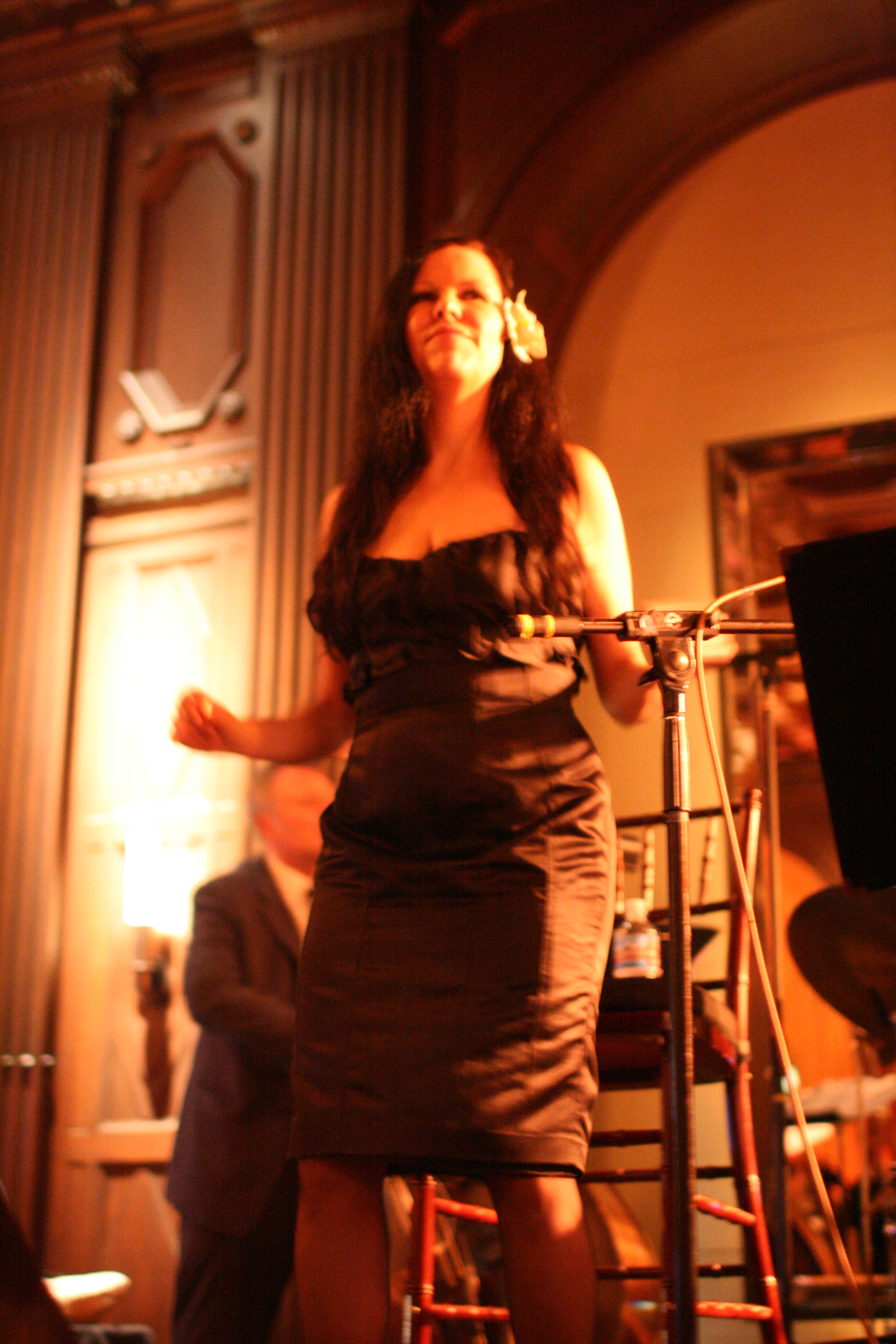
- Lavay Smith in 2007

Background information
- Born: 1967 (age 58–59); Long Beach, California, U.S.
- Genres: Swing; blues
- Occupation: Singer
- Years active: 1980s–present
- Label: Fat Note
- Member of: Lavay Smith & Her Red Hot Skillet Lickers
- Website: www.lavaysmith.com

Lavay Smith (born 1967) is an American singer specializing in swing, jazz, and blues. She tours with her eight-piece "little big band", Lavay Smith & Her Red Hot Skillet Lickers.

== Biography ==
The fourth of five children, Lavay Smith was born in Long Beach, California. Her father was a jazz fan, and she grew up hearing Fats Waller, Bessie Smith, Helen Humes, Billie Holiday, and Dinah Washington, though she listened to genres outside of jazz. When she was twelve, she moved with her family to the Philippines. In her teens she sang in a rock band in Manila, performing for members of the American military. The family moved back to California, where she attended high school. After moving to San Francisco, she sang in coffee houses, accompanying herself on guitar. She formed the Red Hot Skillet Lickers in 1989 with Chris Siebert, who was a member of the washboard-jazz band Bo Grumpus with guitarist Craig Ventresco. Smith combined "red hot" with Gid Tanner's 1920s country band, the Skillet Lickers. The band played rock and roll clubs, then became popular with the swing revival that started several years later. Their first album was released in 1996. The song "Everybody's Talkin' 'bout Miss Thang" peaked at No. 24 on the Billboard magazine Jazz chart in 2000.

== Band ==
Lavay Smith & Her Red Hot Skillet Lickers

Since 1996 she has performed and toured with an eight-piece lineup (four horns and four rhythm) of trumpet, trombone, alto saxophone, tenor saxophone, piano, guitar, bass, and drums. Occasionally, Lavay expands the band to ten pieces (six horns and four rhythm) by adding a second trumpet and a baritone. Lavay also performs with a sixteen-piece big band.

=== Members ===
The band consists of Bill Ortiz (trumpet); Mike Olmos (trumpet); Danny Armstrong (trombone); Jules Broussard (alto and tenor saxophones); Charles McNeal (alto and tenor saxophones); Howard Wiley (tenor saxophone); Robert Stewart (tenor saxophone); Pete Cornell (alto, tenor and baritone saxophones); Chris Siebert (piano, arranger, bandleader), Charlie Siebert (guitar); David Ewell (double bass); Marcus Shelby (double bass); and Darrell Green (drums). Arrangements are written by Chris Siebert and David Berger.

== Discography ==
- One Hour Mama (Fat Note, 1996)
- Everybody's Talkin' 'bout Miss Thing! (Fat Note, 2000)
- Miss Smith to You! (2009) (Fat Note, 2009)
