= Billy Eckstine =

American jazz singer and bandleader (1914–1993)

- Eckstine, c. 1946

Background information
- Born: William Clarence Eckstein; July 8, 1914; Pittsburgh, Pennsylvania, U.S.
- Died: March 8, 1993 (aged 78) Pittsburgh, Pennsylvania, U.S.
- Genre: Jazz
- Occupation: Musician
- Instruments: Vocals, valve trombone, trumpet, guitar
- Years active: 1939–1993
- Formerly of: The Billy Eckstine Orchestra

William Clarence Eckstine (July 8, 1914 – March 8, 1993) was an American jazz and pop singer and a bandleader during the swing and bebop eras. He was noted for his rich, almost operatic bass-baritone voice. In 2019, Eckstine was posthumously awarded the Grammy Lifetime Achievement Award "for performers who, during their lifetimes, have made creative contributions of outstanding artistic significance to the field of recording". His recording of "I Apologize" (MGM, 1951) was given the Grammy Hall of Fame Award in 1999. The New York Times described him as an "influential band leader" whose "suave bass-baritone" and "full-throated, sugary approach to popular songs inspired singers such as Earl Coleman, Johnny Hartman, Joe Williams, Arthur Prysock, and Lou Rawls."

== Early life and education ==
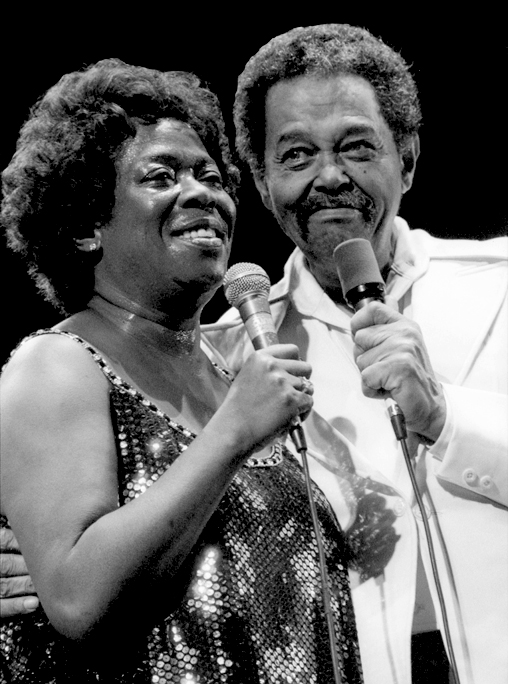
Sarah Vaughan and Eckstine at the Monterey Jazz Festival 1981

Eckstine was born in Pittsburgh, Pennsylvania, United States, the son of William Eckstein, a chauffeur, and Charlotte Eckstein, a seamstress. Eckstine's paternal grandparents were William F. Eckstein and Nannie Eckstein, a mixed-race, married couple who lived in Washington, D.C.; both were born in 1863. William was born in Prussia, and Nannie in Virginia. Billy's sister, Maxine, was a high school teacher.

Eckstine attended Peabody High School in Pittsburgh. Other notables who were educated there include the artist Romare Bearden, Gene Kelly, pianist Dodo Marmarosa and Lorin Maazel. During this time, Eckstine moved to Washington, D.C., attending Armstrong High School (where his sister taught), St. Paul Normal and Industrial School, and Howard University. In 1933, aged 19, he left Howard to start a music career, after winning first place and $10 in an amateur talent contest at Washington's Howard Theatre, where he imitated Cab Calloway singing a nursery rhyme with interpolated scatting.

== Career ==
Heading to Chicago, Illinois, Eckstine joined Earl Hines' Grand Terrace Orchestra in 1939, staying with the band as vocalist and trumpeter until 1943. By that time, Eckstine had begun to make a name for himself through the Hines band's juke-box hits, such as "Stormy Monday Blues", and his own "Jelly, Jelly".

In 1944, Eckstine formed his own big band, and it became the finishing school for adventurous young musicians who shaped the future of jazz including Charlie Parker, Dizzy Gillespie, Dexter Gordon, Gene Ammons, Miles Davis, Art Blakey, Cecil Payne, Fats Navarro, Lucky Thompson, John Malachi, Sarah Vaughan, Pearl Bailey, and Lena Horne. Tadd Dameron, Gil Fuller and Jerry Valentine were among the band's arrangers. The Billy Eckstine Orchestra is considered to be the first bebop big-band, and had Top Ten chart entries that included "A Cottage for Sale" and "Prisoner of Love". Both were awarded a gold disc by the RIAA.

Dizzy Gillespie, in reflecting on the band in his 1979 autobiography To Be or Not to Bop, gives this perspective: "There was no band that sounded like Billy Eckstine's. Our attack was strong, and we were playing bebop, the modern style. No other band like this one existed in the world." In 1946 Eckstine starred as the hero in the musical film Rhythm in a Riff, which also starred Ann Baker and Lucky Millinder.

Eckstine became a solo performer in 1947, with records featuring lush, sophisticated orchestrations. Even before folding his band, Eckstine had recorded solo to support it, scoring two million-sellers in 1945 with "Cottage for Sale" and a revival of "Prisoner of Love". Far more successful than his band recordings, these prefigured Eckstine's future career. Eckstine recorded more than a dozen hits during the late 1940s. He signed with the newly established MGM Records, and had immediate hits with revivals of "Everything I Have Is Yours" (1947), Rodgers and Hart's "Blue Moon" (1948), and Juan Tizol's "Caravan" (1949).

Eckstine had further success in 1950 with Victor Young's theme song to "My Foolish Heart", and the next year with a revival of the 1931 Bing Crosby hit, "I Apologize".

According to The New York Times, his 1950 appearance at the Paramount Theatre in New York City drew a larger audience than Frank Sinatra had done at his performance there. He was even called "the sepia Sinatra" for his rivalry of the country's most popular vocalist.

Eckstine was the subject of a three-page profile in the April 24, 1950 issue of Life magazine, in which the photographer Martha Holmes accompanied Eckstine and his entourage during a week in New York City. One photograph taken by Holmes and published in Life showed Eckstine with a group of white female admirers, one of whom had her hand on his shoulder and her head on his chest while she was laughing. Eckstine's biographer, Cary Ginell, wrote of the image that Holmes "...captured a moment of shared exuberance, joy, and affection, unblemished by racial tension". Holmes later described the photograph as the favorite of the many she had taken in her career, because it "...told just what the world should be like". The photograph was considered so controversial that an editor at Life sought personal approval from Henry Luce, the magazine's publisher, who said it should be published. The publication of the image caused letters of protest to be written to the magazine, and singer Harry Belafonte subsequently said of the publication that "When that photo hit, in this national publication, it was if a barrier had been broken". The controversy that resulted from the photograph had a severe effect on the trajectory of Eckstine's career. Tony Bennett recalled that "It changed everything...Before that, he had a tremendous following...and it just offended the white community", a sentiment shared by pianist Billy Taylor who said that the "coverage and that picture just slammed the door shut for him".

In 1951, Eckstine performed at the seventh Cavalcade of Jazz concert held on July 8 at Wrigley Field in Los Angeles, produced by Leon Hefflin, Sr. Also featured were Lionel Hampton and his Revue, Percy Mayfield, Jimmy Witherspoon, Joe Liggins and The Honeydrippers and Roy Brown.

Among Eckstine's recordings of the 1950s was a 1957 duet with Sarah Vaughan, "Passing Strangers", a minor hit for them in 1957, but an initial No. 22 success in the UK Singles Chart.

The 1960 Las Vegas live album, No Cover, No Minimum, featured Eckstine taking a few trumpet solos and showcasing his nightclub act. He recorded albums for Mercury and Roulette in the early 1960s and appeared on Motown albums during the mid to late years of the decade. After recording sparingly during the 1970s for Al Bell's Stax/Enterprise imprint, the international touring Eckstine made his last recording, the Grammy-nominated Billy Eckstine Sings with Benny Carter in 1986.

Eckstine made numerous appearances on television variety shows, including on The Ed Sullivan Show, The Nat King Cole Show, The Tonight Show with Steve Allen, Jack Paar, and Johnny Carson, The Merv Griffin Show, The Art Linkletter Show, The Joey Bishop Show, The Dean Martin Show, The Flip Wilson Show, and Playboy After Dark. He also performed as an actor in the television sitcom Sanford and Son, and in such films as Skirts Ahoy, Let's Do It Again, and Jo Jo Dancer. He performed "The Star-Spangled Banner" prior to Game 4 of the 1979 World Series at Three Rivers Stadium in his native Pittsburgh.

Culturally, Eckstine was a fashion icon. He was famous for his "Mr. B. Collar" – a high roll collar that formed a "B" over a Windsor-knotted tie (or without a tie at all). The collars were worn by many a hipster in the late 1940s and early 1950s.

In 1984, Eckstine recorded his penultimate album, I Am a Singer, arranged and conducted by Angelo DiPippo and featuring Toots Thielemans on harmonica. In November 1986, Eckstine recorded with saxophonist Benny Carter for his 1987 album Billy Eckstine Sings with Benny Carter. Eckstine made his final recordings for Motorcity Records, a label for ex-Motown artists founded by Ian Levine.

== Personal life ==
He married his first wife June in 1942. After their divorce in 1952, he married actress and model Carolle Drake in 1953, and they remained married until his death. He was the father of four children by his second marriage including Ed Eckstine, a president of Mercury Records; Guy Eckstine, a Columbia and Verve Records A&R executive and record producer; Singer and entrepreneur Charlotte Eckstein; and singer Gina Eckstine.

== Illness and death ==
Eckstine suffered a stroke while performing in Salina, Kansas, in April 1992, and never performed again. Although his speech improved in the hospital, Eckstine had a heart attack and died nearly a year later on March 8, 1993, in Pittsburgh, aged 78. In the weeks leading up to his death, his family members played music for him in his room. His final word was "Basie".

A State Historical Marker was placed at 5913 Bryant Street in Pittsburgh's Highland Park neighborhood to mark the house where Eckstine grew up.

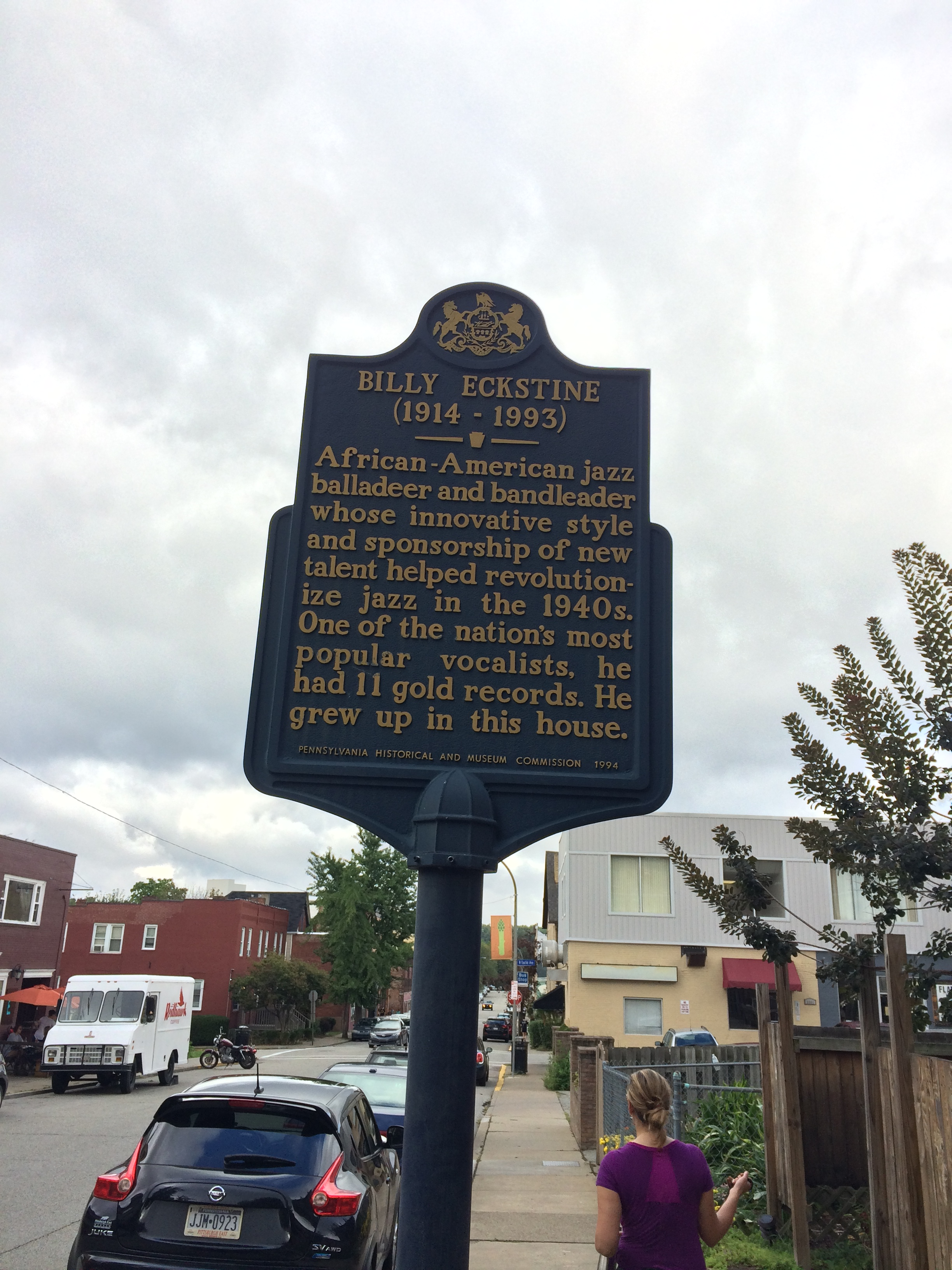
Historical Marker in Highland Park, Pittsburgh, Pennsylvania

== Tributes ==
His friend Duke Ellington recalled Eckstine's artistry in his 1973 autobiography Music is My Mistress:

Eckstine-style love songs opened new lines of communication for the man in the man-woman merry-go-round, and blues a la B were the essence of cool. When he made a recording of "Caravan", I was happy and honored to watch one of our tunes help take him into the stratosphere of universal acclaim. And, of course, he hasn't looked back since. A remarkable artist, the sonorous B. ... His style and technique have been extensively copied by some of the neocommercial singers, but despite their efforts, he remains out front to show how and what should have been done.

Sammy Davis Jr. made several live appearances and impersonated Eckstine. Eckstine was a pallbearer at Davis' funeral in 1990.

And, in Billboard magazine, Quincy Jones stated:

I looked up to Mr. B as an idol. I wanted to dress like him, talk like him, pattern my whole life as a musician and as a complete person in the image of dignity that he projected.... As a black man, Eckstine was not immune to the prejudice that characterized the 1950s.

Jones is quoted in Leonard Feather's book The Pleasures of Jazz as also saying of Eckstine:

If he'd been white, the sky would have been the limit. As it was, he didn't have his own radio or TV show, much less a movie career. He had to fight the system, so things never quite fell into place."

Lionel Hampton said:

He was one of the greatest singers of all time.... We were proud of him because he was the first Black popular singer singing popular songs in our race. We, the whole music profession, were so happy to see him achieve what he was doing. He was one of the greatest singers of that era.... He was our singer."

== Discography ==
=== 10" LP releases ===
- 1940: Earl Hines – Billy Eckstine [Record 1: "Stormy Monday Blues" // "Water Boy"; Record 2: "I Got It Bad (And That Ain't Good)" // "Somehow"; Record 3: "Jelly, Jelly" // "Skylark"] (RCA Victor) 3x78rpm album set
- 1940-42: Earl Hines – Billy Eckstine: A Treasury Of Immortal Performances (RCA Victor, 1953)
- 1944: The Great Mr. B: Billy Eckstine and His All-Star Band (DeLuxe/King, 1953)
- 1945-47: Billy Eckstine Sings (National, 1949)
- 1950: Songs By Billy Eckstine (MGM) – No. 4 in the United States.
- 1951: Billy Eckstine Favorites (MGM)
- 1952: Love Songs By Rodgers and Hammerstein (MGM)
- 1953: Billy Eckstine Sings Tenderly (MGM)
- 1954: I Let a Song Go Out of My Heart: Billy Eckstine Sings 8 Great Duke Ellington Songs (MGM)
- 1954: Blues For Sale (EmArcy)
- 1954: The Love Songs of Mr. B (EmArcy)

=== 12" LP releases ===
- 1955: I Surrender, Dear (EmArcy)
- 1955 Mr. B With a Beat (MGM) – with George Shearing Quintet, Woody Herman Orchestra, and The Metronome All Stars.
- 1955: Rendezvous (MGM)
- 1955: That Old Feeling (MGM)
- 1957: Prisoner of Love (Regent)
- 1957: The Duke, The Blues and Me! (Regent)
- 1957: My Deep Blue Dream (Regent)
- 1957-58: Mr. B In Paris (Felsted/Decca [UK]; Barclay [France] 1961); all 12 songs sung in French
- 1958: You Call It Madness (Regent)
- 1958: Billy Eckstine's Imagination (EmArcy)
- 1958: Billy Eckstine & Sarah Vaughan Sing Irving Berlin (Mercury)
- 1958: Billy's Best! (Mercury)
- 1959: Basie and Eckstine, Inc. with Count Basie Orchestra (Roulette)
- 1960: No Cover, No Minimum (Roulette)
- 1960: Once More With Feeling (Roulette)
- 1961: Broadway, Bongos and Mr. B (Mercury)
- 1962: At Basin St. East with Quincy Jones (Mercury)
- 1962: Don't Worry 'Bout Me (Mercury)
- 1963: The Golden Hits of Billy Eckstine (Mercury) – compilation
- 1963: Now Singing In 12 Great Movies (Mercury)
- 1964: The Modern Sound of Mr. B (Mercury)
- 1965: The Prime of My Life (Motown)
- 1966: My Way (Motown)
- 1969: For Love of Ivy [also released as Gentle On My Mind] (Motown)
- 1971: Stormy (Enterprise/Stax)
- 1971: Feel the Warm (Enterprise/Stax)
- 1971: Moment (Capitol)
- 1972: Senior Soul (Enterprise/Stax)
- 1974: If She Walked Into My Life (Enterprise/Stax)
- 1979: Momento Brasiliero (Portuguese import release on Som Livre label)
- 1984: I Am a Singer (Kimbo)
- 1986: Billy Eckstine Sings with Benny Carter with special guest: Helen Merrill (Verve)

=== LP/CD compilations of note ===
- 1960: Mr. B: The Great Billy Eckstine and His Orchestra (Audio Lab) – 12" LP reissue of The Great Mr. B from DeLuxe/King.
- 1963: Billy & Sarah – with Sarah Vaughan (Lion) – compilation
- 1971: Billy Eckstine Together (Spotlite) – 1945 live "radio broadcast" recordings
- 1979: Billy Eckstine Sings (Savoy Jazz) – compilation
- 1986: Mister B. and the Band: The Savoy Sessions (Savoy Jazz) – compilation
- 1986: I Want To Talk About You (Xanadu) – this compilation features Eckstine's earliest recordings, 13 selections taken from his 1940–1942 Bluebird sides with the Earl Hines Orchestra; album is rounded out by three ballads taken from a 1945 live "radio broadcast" with his own big band.
- 1991: Everything I Have Is Yours: The Best Of The MGM Years (Verve) – two-CD anthology with 42 tracks (note: the original 2-LP set was issued in 1985 with just 30 tracks)
- 1991: Compact Jazz: Billy Eckstine (Verve) – compilation
- 1994: Jazz 'Round Midnight: Billy Eckstine (Verve) – compilation
- 1994: Verve Jazz Masters (Volume 22): Billy Eckstine (Verve) – compilation
- 1996: Air Mail Special (Drive Archive) – reissue of the 1945 live "radio broadcast" recordings.
- 1996: The Magnificent Mr. B (Flapper/Pearl) – anthology/compilation of material recorded with Earl Hines (for the Bluebird label), and Eckstine's recordings with his orchestra (for the DeLuxe and National labels).
- 1997: The Chronological Billy Eckstine and His Orchestra 1944–1945 (Classics) – anthology/compilation
- 1999: The Chronological Billy Eckstine and His Orchestra 1946–1947 (Classics) – anthology/compilation
- 2001: Mr. B (ASV/Living Era) – anthology/compilation
- 2002: The Legendary Big Band (1944–1947) (Savoy Jazz) – two-CD anthology (all of Eckstine's recordings for the DeLuxe and National labels).
- 2002: Timeless Billy Eckstine (Savoy Jazz) – compilation
- 2003: Kiss of Fire (Sepia) – compilation (contains 25 tracks recorded 1947–1952 for the MGM label).
- 2003: The Motown Years (Motown/UMe) – two-CD anthology
- 2004: Love Songs (Savoy Jazz) – compilation
- 2004: A Proper Introduction To Billy Eckstine: Ballads, Blues and Bebop (Proper) – anthology/compilation
- 2005: Jukebox Hits 1943–1953 (Acrobat) – anthology/compilation
- 2005: Early Mr. B: 1940–1953 (Jazz Legends) – anthology/compilation of material recorded with Earl Hines (for the Bluebird label), and Eckstine's recordings with his orchestra (for the DeLuxe, National and MGM labels).
- 2006: Prisoner of Love: The Romantic Billy Eckstine (Savoy Jazz) – this is a reissue of Timeless Billy Eckstine.
- 2008: All of My Life (Jasmine) – two-CD anthology (contains 35 tracks recorded for the MGM label; also includes all 10 of his 1956 RCA recordings; and 10 of his 1957–1958 Mercury recordings).
