= Bobby Tucker =

American singer

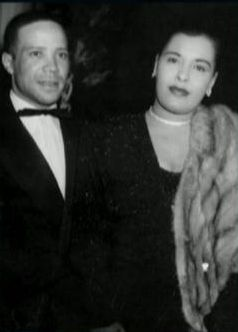
- Bobby Tucker and Billie Holiday in 1948

Background information
- Also known as: Piano Man
- Born: Robert Nathaniel Tucker; January 8, 1923; Morristown, New Jersey, U.S.
- Origin: Harlem, New York, U.S.
- Died: April 12, 2007 (aged 84) Morristown, New Jersey, U.S.
- Genres: Jazz, swing
- Occupations: Pianist, composer, arranger
- Instrument: Piano
- Years active: 1946–2007

Bobby Tucker (born Robert Nathaniel Tucker; January 8, 1923 – April 12, 2007) was a pianist and arranger during the jazz era from the 1940s into the 1960s. He is most famous for being Billie Holiday's accompanist from 1946 to 1949 and Billy Eckstine's from 1950 to 1993.

== Music career ==
=== Billie Holiday ===
On November 12, 1946, during Billie Holiday's stay at the Down Beat Club, Bobby Tucker was drafted to accompany Holiday because Eddie Heywood refused his opportunity. Billie's stay at the Down Beat was so successful due to Tucker's playing that she decided to keep him as her accompanist. The partnership lasted until 1949, where Tucker quit due to Holiday's abusive lover, John Levy, threatening him. (Not to be confused with John Levy the bass player and talent manager).

=== Billy Eckstine ===
After leaving Holiday in 1949, Bobby Tucker began playing for Billy Eckstine. Not much is known about this partnership, but there is a 1960 album, No Cover, No Minimum which features Tucker playing piano for Eckstine. On the 1959 album Basie/Eckstine Incorporated, on which Eckstine sang with the Count Basie Orchestra, Tucker is credited with the arrangements for eight of the eleven tracks, and he replaced Basie at the piano on most of the cuts as well.

In 1960 Tucker also released his own album under his own name, Too Tough. In 1973 Tucker played for Billy Eckstine at the Hobart (Tasmania, Australia) Wrest Point Casino. From the time Tuck, as "Mr. B" called him, met Eckstine, they were very good friends till Eckstine's death in 1993. Eckstine called Tucker a brother he never had; as he would say, Tuck was his right tonsil. Tucker was more like part of the Eckstine family.

Tucker died of a heart attack at the age of 84, on April 12, 2007.
